= 2022–23 Scottish Junior Cup =

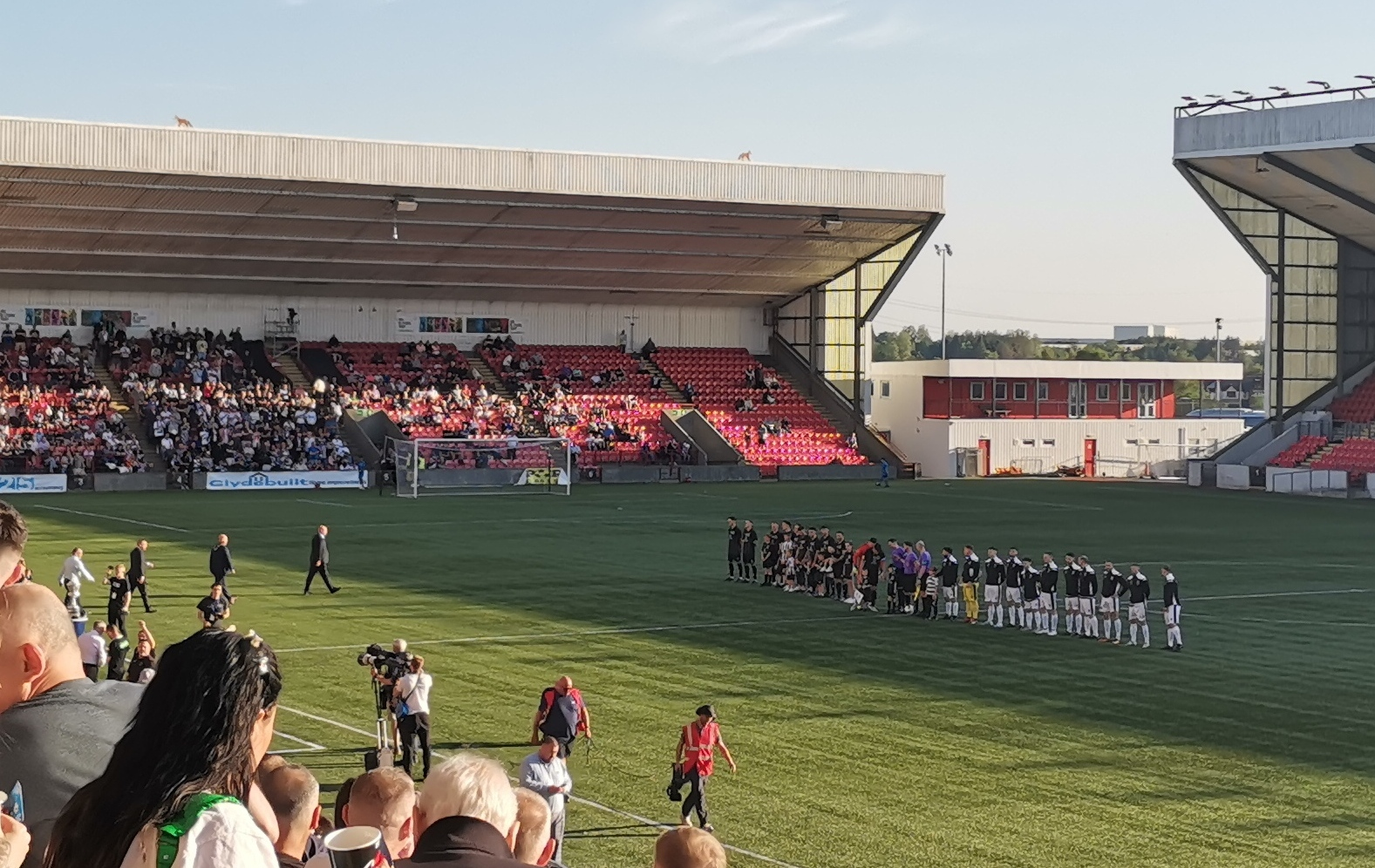
- Teams line up for the final at Broadwood Stadium (Glencairn in white shorts; trophy visible on left)

Tournament details
- Country: Scotland
- Teams: 108

Final positions
- Champions: Cumnock Juniors
- Runners-up: Rutherglen Glencairn

Tournament statistics
- Matches played: 107
- Goals scored: 439 (4.1 per match)
- All statistics correct as of 3 June 2023.

The 2022–23 Scottish Junior Cup known as the Clydebuilt Home Improvements Scottish Junior Cup due to sponsorship reasons, was the 136th season of the Scottish Junior Cup, the national knockout tournament for member clubs of the Scottish Junior Football Association (SJFA). A total of 108 clubs entered the competition, two fewer than in 2021–22.

Belshill Athletic, Darvel, Lossiemouth United, Royal Albert, Rutherglen Glencairn, and Vale Of Clyde all took part once again having rejoined the SJFA, while Annbank United, Fauldhouse, Girvan, Kello Rovers, Pollok, Renfrew, Spey Valley United, and Whitletts Victoria did not compete after declining to renew their SJFA membership. Buckie Rovers, Hall Russell United, and Whitehills were in abeyance, and Pumpherston Juniors did not compete. Banks O' Dee Junior were the newest entrant (they were set up after the main Banks O' Dee club was promoted to the Highland Football League).

Auchinleck Talbot were the defending champions; they were eliminated in the Round of 16 by local rivals Cumnock Juniors, who went on to defeat their other neighbours Glenafton Athletic in the semi-finals, then overcame Rutherglen Glencairn in the final to claim the trophy for the first time since 1989, and the third time overall.

== Calendar ==
The dates for each round of the 2022–23 tournament were as follows:

Round	Main date	Matches	Clubs
First round	27 August 2022	44	108 → 64
Second round	24 September 2022	32	64 → 32
Third round	29 October 2022	16	32 → 16
Fourth round	3 December 2022	8	16 → 8
Quarter-finals	11 February 2023	4	8 → 4
Semi-finals	14 and 16 April 2023	2	4 → 2
Final	2 June 2023	1	2 → 1

Drawn matches proceed direct to a penalty shootout, with no extra time. The semi-finals and final were played at a neutral venue, prior to 2021–22 semi-finals were played home and away over two legs.

== First round ==
=== Draw ===
The first round draw took place at Hampden Park on 21 July 2022.

Clubs taking part in the Scottish Cup — Auchinleck Talbot, Benburb, Carnoustie Panmure, Cumnock Juniors, Darvel, Irvine Meadow XI, Lochee United, Rutherglen Glencairn, Syngenta, Tayport — received a bye into the second round draw, along with ten other clubs.

Tier	6	7	8	9
Teams	Midlands League (16): Arbroath Victoria; Blairgowrie; Brechin Victoria; Broughty Athletic; Coupar Angus; Downfield; Dundee North End; Dundee St James; Dundee Violet; East Craigie; Forfar United; Forfar West End; Kirriemuir Thistle; Letham; Lochee Harp; Scone Thistle; North Region Premier Division (13): Banchory St Ternan; Bridge of Don Thistle; Colony Park; Culter; Dufftown; Dyce; East End; Ellon United; Hermes; Maud; Montrose Roselea; Nairn St Ninian; Stonehaven; West of Scotland League Premier Division (7): Arthurlie; Beith Juniors; Cambuslang Rangers; Glenafton Athletic; Largs Thistle; Petershill; Troon	North Region League Championship (14): Aberdeen University; Banks O' Dee Junior; Buchanhaven Hearts; Burghead Thistle; Cruden Bay; Deveronside; Forres Thistle; Fraserburgh United (reinstated after Irvine Victoria expelled); Islavale; Longside; Lossiemouth United; New Elgin Juniors; Newmachar United; Rothie Rovers; West of Scotland League First Division (6): Blantyre Victoria; Cumbernauld United; Gartcairn; Johnstone Burgh; Rossvale; Shotts Bon Accord	West of Scotland League Second Division (13): Ardeer Thistle; Ashfield; Craigmark Burntonians; Glasgow Perthshire; Glasgow United; Greenock Juniors; Kilsyth Rangers; Maryhill; Maybole Juniors; Muirkirk Juniors; St Anthony's; Wishaw; Yoker Athletic	East of Scotland League Third Division (5): Armadale Thistle; Harthill Royal; Livingston United; Stoneyburn; West Calder United; West of Scotland League Third Division (14): Ardrossan Winton Rovers; Bellshill Athletic; Carluke Rovers; Dalry Thistle; East Kilbride Thistle; Irvine Victoria (Expelled for fielding a suspended player); Lanark United; Lesmahagow; Lugar Boswell Thistle; Newmains United; Royal Albert; Saltcoats Victoria; Vale of Clyde; Vale of Leven

=== Matches ===
Home team	Score	Away team
26 August 2022
Rossvale	0–0 (4–3 p)	Muirkirk Juniors
27 August 2022
Ardeer Thistle	1–1 (5–4 p)	Johnstone Burgh
Arthurlie	10–1	Harthill Royal
Banks O' Dee Junior	2–4	Newmains United
Blairgowrie	0–6	Stonehaven
Brechin Victoria	0–5	Maybole Juniors
Buchanhaven Hearts	0–3	Ashfield
Carluke Rovers	1–1 (2–3 p)	Ellon United
Colony Park	3–4	Bellshill Athletic
Coupar Angus	0–8	Beith Juniors
Craigmark Burntonians	2–2 (4–2 p)	Largs Thistle
Cumbernauld United	0–2	Shotts Bon Accord
Downfield	3–2	Dyce
Dufftown	0–3	Maryhill
Dundee North End	1–0	Deveronside
Dundee St James	0–5	St Anthony's
Dundee Violet	1–4	Culter
East Craigie	2–1	Cambuslang Rangers
East End	5–3	Lanark United
Forfar West End	1–4	Kilsyth Rangers
Forres Thistle	4–1	Aberdeen University

Home team	Score	Away team
Glasgow Perthshire	6–1	Cruden Bay
Glasgow United	0–3	Blantyre Victoria
Glenafton Athletic	8–1	East Kilbride Thistle
Greenock Juniors	7–2	Saltcoats Victoria
Irvine Victoria	2–2 (5–4 p)	Fraserburgh United
Islavale	1–4	Dalry Thistle
Kirriemuir Thistle	2–4	Broughty Athletic
Lesmahagow	1–2	Hermes
Letham	1–1 (3–1 p)	Burghead Thistle
Livingston United	1–1 (3–2 p)	Yoker Athletic
Lochee Harp	0–1	Newmachar United
Longside	1–3	Stoneyburn
Lossiemouth United	0–6	Arbroath Victoria
Lugar Boswell Thistle	3–2	Forfar United
Montrose Roselea	3–2	Maud
Petershill	4–0	Nairn St Ninian
Rothie Rovers	4–2	Armadale Thistle
Royal Albert	1–4	West Calder United
Scone Thistle	5–2	New Elgin
Troon	4–1	Ardrossan Winton Rovers
Vale of Clyde	2–2 (3–5 p)	Gartcairn
Vale of Leven	2–4	Banchory St Ternan
Wishaw	2–1	Bridge of Don Thistle

== Second round ==
=== Draw ===
The second round draw took place on the PLZ Soccer - The Football Show YouTube channel on 26 Aug 2022.

Clubs taking part in the Scottish Cup and the teams that received a bye all entered at this round.

Tier	6	7	8	9
Teams	Midlands League (11): Arbroath Victoria; Broughty Athletic; Carnoustie Panmure; Downfield; Dundee North End; East Craigie; Letham; Lochee United; Scone Thistle; Tayport; North Region Premier Division (8): Banchory St Ternan; Culter; East End; Ellon United; Hermes; Montrose Roselea; Stonehaven; Stoneywood Parkvale; West of Scotland League Premier Division (11): Auchinleck Talbot; Arthurlie; Beith Juniors; Cumnock Juniors; Darvel; Glenafton Athletic; Hurlford United; Irvine Meadow XI; Kirkintilloch Rob Roy; Petershill; Troon	North Region Championship (6): Glentanar; Forres Thistle; Fraserburgh United; Newmachar United; Rothie Rovers; Sunnybank; West of Scotland League First Division (9): Blantyre Victoria; Benburb; Gartcairn; Kilbirnie Ladeside; Rossvale; Rutherglen Glencairn; Shotts Bon Accord; St Roch's; Thorniewood United	East of Scotland League Second Division (1): Syngenta; West of Scotland League Second Division (10): Ardeer Thistle; Ashfield; Craigmark Burntonians; Glasgow Perthshire; Greenock Juniors; Kilsyth Rangers; Maryhill; Maybole Juniors; St Anthony's; Wishaw	East of Scotland League Third Division (4): Bathgate Thistle; Livingston United; Stoneyburn; West Calder United; West of Scotland League Third Division (5): Bellshill Athletic; Dalry Thistle; Larkhall Thistle; Lugar Boswell Thistle; Newmains United

=== Matches ===
Home team	Score	Away team
16 September 2022
Petershill	1–1 (4–1 p)	Irvine Meadow XI
24 September 2022
Arbroath Victoria	2-1	Kilsyth Rangers
Arthurlie	4-0	Lugar Boswell Thistle
Banchory St Ternan	1-6	Gartcairn
Beith Juniors	2-0	Hermes
Carnoustie Panmure	4-2	West Calder United
Cumnock Juniors	1-1 (4–2 p)	Ashfield
Dalry Thistle	1-2	Stoneyburn
Darvel	10-1	Glentanar
East Craigie	3-2	Broughty Athletic
East End	2-2 (6–5 p)	Sunnybank FC
Ellon United	1-1 (3–1 p)	Bathgate Thistle
Forres Thistle	0-1	Thorniewood United
Glasgow Perthshire	1-2	Kilbirnie Ladeside
Greenock Juniors	1-5	Rutherglen Glencairn

Home team	Score	Away team
Hurlford United	7-0	Downfield
Kirkintilloch Rob Roy	3-0	Dundee North End
Larkhall Thistle	3-1	Benburb
Livingston United	4-1	Scone Thistle
Lochee United	1-2	St Roch's
Maryhill	4-1	Newmains United
Montrose Roselea	1-2	Shotts Bon Accord
Newmachar United	2-0	Letham
Rossvale	2-4	Auchinleck Talbot
Rothie Rovers	1-5	Glenafton Athletic
St Anthony's	1-1 (6–7 p)	Blantyre Victoria
Stonehaven	1-1 (6–5 p)	Culter
Syngenta	w/o	Craigmark Burntonians
Tayport	7-1	Ardeer Thistle
Wishaw	1-2	Maybole Juniors
8 October 2022
Stoneywood Parkvale	1-2	Bellshill Athletic
22 October 2022
Troon	4-0	Fraserburgh United

== Third round ==
=== Draw ===
The third round draw took place on the PLZ Soccer - The Football Show YouTube channel on 16 Sep 2022.

Tier	6	7	8	9
Teams	Midlands League (4): Arbroath Victoria; Carnoustie Panmure; East Craigie; Tayport; North Region Premier Division (3): East End; Ellon United; Stonehaven; West of Scotland League Premier Division (10): Auchinleck Talbot; Arthurlie; Beith Juniors; Cumnock Juniors; Darvel; Glenafton Athletic; Hurlford United; Kirkintilloch Rob Roy; Petershill; Troon	North Region Championship (1): Newmachar United; West of Scotland League First Division (7): Blantyre Victoria; Gartcairn; Kilbirnie Ladeside; Rutherglen Glencairn; Shotts Bon Accord; St Roch's; Thorniewood United	West of Scotland League Second Division (3): Craigmark Burntonians; Maryhill; Maybole Juniors	East of Scotland League Third Division (2): Livingston United; Stoneyburn; West of Scotland League Third Division (2): Bellshill Athletic; Larkhall Thistle

=== Matches ===
Home team	Score	Away team
29 October 2022
Arbroath Victoria	0-0 (4–5 p)	Hurlford United
Gartcairn	2-0	Livingston United
Craigmark Burntonians	2-3	Kilbirnie Ladeside
Cumnock Juniors	4-1	Thorniewood United
East Craigie	3-1	Ellon United
East End	3-1	Newmachar United
Kirkintilloch Rob Roy	1-3	Arthurlie
Shotts Bon Accord	2-2 (7–6 p)	Beith Juniors
Petershill	2-3	Carnoustie Panmure
Auchinleck Talbot	3-1	Darvel
Glenafton Athletic	4-1	Stoneyburn
Blantyre Victoria	0-3	Troon
Stonehaven	1-4	St Roch's
Bellshill Athletic	5-2	Maryhill
Tayport	0-4	Rutherglen Glencairn
Maybole Juniors	1-1 (4–5 p)	Larkhall Thistle

== Fourth round ==
=== Draw ===
The fourth round draw took place on the at Clydebuilt Home Improvements Limited Offices on 28 Oct 2022.

Tier	6	7	9
Teams	Midlands League (2): Carnoustie Panmure; East Craigie; North Region Premier Division (1): East End; West of Scotland League Premier Division (6): Auchinleck Talbot; Arthurlie; Cumnock Juniors; Glenafton Athletic; Hurlford United; Troon	West of Scotland League First Division (5): Gartcairn; Kilbirnie Ladeside; Rutherglen Glencairn; Shotts Bon Accord; St Roch's	West of Scotland League Third Division (2): Bellshill Athletic; Larkhall Thistle

=== Matches ===
Home team	Score	Away team
3 December 2022
Bellshill Athletic	2–2 (2–1 p)	Kilbirnie Ladeside
Carnoustie Panmure	1–3	Glenafton Athletic
Cumnock Juniors	0–0 (4–3 p)	Auchinleck Talbot
East Craigie	1–1 (3–1 p)	St Roch's
Gartcairn	1–2	Rutherglen Glencairn
Hurlford United	1–0	Troon
Larkhall Thistle	1–1 (7–6 p)	East End
Shotts Bon Accord	2–2 (5–4 p)	Arthurlie

== Quarter-final ==
=== Draw ===
The quarter final draw took place at Hampden Park on 2 December 2022.

Tier	6	7	9
Teams	Midlands League (1): East Craigie; West of Scotland League Premier Division (3): Cumnock Juniors; Glenafton Athletic; Hurlford United	West of Scotland League First Division (2): Rutherglen Glencairn; Shotts Bon Accord	West of Scotland League Third Division (2): Bellshill Athletic; Larkhall Thistle

=== Matches ===
Home team	Score	Away team
11 February 2023
Bellshill Athletic	0–4	Glenafton Athletic
East Craigie	2–1	Shotts Bon Accord
Hurlford United	1–2	Cumnock Juniors
Larkhall Thistle	1–2	Rutherglen Glencairn

== Semi-final ==
=== Draw ===
The semi final draw took place at Hampden Park on 14 February 2023

Tier	6	7
Teams	Midlands League (1): East Craigie; West of Scotland League Premier Division (2): Cumnock Juniors; Glenafton Athletic	West of Scotland League First Division (1): Rutherglen Glencairn

=== Matches ===
14 April 2023
19:30

Glenafton Athletic	2–4	Cumnock Juniors

Meadow Park, Irvine

16 April 2023
14:00

Rutherglen Glencairn	1–1	East Craigie
Penalties
	8–7

Volunteer Park, Armadale

== Final ==
The Final of the Scottish Junior Cup was played at Broadwood Stadium, Cumbernauld on Friday 2 June with a 7.35pm kick off. The game was televised live by BBC Alba.

2 June 2023
19:35

Cumnock Juniors	1–0	Rutherglen Glencairn
Frye 90+2'	Report

Broadwood Stadium, Cumbernauld
Attendance: 4,034
Referee: George Calder
