= 2015–16 Scottish Junior Cup =

2015–16 ETHXenergy Scottish Junior Cup
Tournament details
- Country: Scotland
- Teams: 158

Final positions
- Champions: Beith Juniors
- Runners-up: Pollok

The 2015–16 Scottish Junior Cup was the 130th season of the Scottish Junior Cup, the national knockout tournament for member clubs of the Scottish Junior Football Association. The competition was sponsored by ETHX Energy and known as The ETHXenergy Scottish Junior Cup. The winner of this competition entered the following season's Scottish Cup at the first round stage.

A total of 158 clubs entered this year's competition, three fewer than the previous season. Dropping out were Ballingry Rovers, who folded, and Harthill Royal, Luncarty, Portgordon Victoria and Whitehills, who were in abeyance. North Region sides Glentanar and Islavale did not enter. New members Easthouses Lily MW and Gartcairn FA Juniors made their debut in the competition, while Coupar Angus and Fochabers returned to the tournament after a year in abeyance.

== First round ==
The six Junior clubs qualified for this season's Scottish Cup, were not included in the draw for the first round:

- Auchinleck Talbot - West of Scotland Super League Premier Division champions and Junior Cup holders
- Kelty Hearts - East Superleague champions
- Hermes - North Superleague champions

Also qualified automatically were Banks O'Dee and Linlithgow Rose who achieved national club licensing requirements and Girvan who qualify automatically as historic full members of the Scottish Football Association.

The first round draw took place at Hampden Park, Glasgow on 27 August 2015.

Home team	Score	Away team
Larkhall Thistle	3 – 2	Haddington Athletic
East Kilbride Thistle	0 – 4	Armadale Thistle
Inverness City	2 – 1	FC Stoneywood
Kilwinning Rangers	3 – 1	Dalry Thistle
Newmains United	1 – 8	Fraserburgh United
Bonnyrigg Rose Athletic	3 – 0	Thorniewood United
Ardeer Thistle	3 – 3	West Calder United
Nairn St. Ninian	1 – 1	Oakley United
Crossgates Primrose	1 – 4	Lanark United
Sunnybank	1 – 5	Yoker Athletic
Stoneyburn	1 – 0	Dyce Juniors
Whitletts Victoria	3 – 1	Lochgelly Albert
Glenafton Athletic	14 – 0	Newmachar United
Hall Russell United	1 – 2	Vale of Clyde
Bridge of Don Thistle	2 – 2	Rosyth

Home team	Score	Away team
Vale of Leven	0 – 0	Kennoway Star Hearts
Newtongrange Star	5 – 1	Edinburgh United
Newburgh	0 – 6	Kilbirnie Ladeside
Irvine Victoria	1 – 7	Camelon Juniors
Maybole	0 – 0	Broxburn Athletic
Ardrossan Winton Rovers	2 – 1	Whitburn
Montrose Roselea	4 – 0	Forfar Albion
Lochee Harp	1 – 2	Tayport
Banchory St. Ternan	1 – 2	East End
Buckie Rovers	0 – 3	Hill of Beath Hawthorn
Burghead Thistle	1 – 5	Kilsyth Rangers
Cumnock Juniors	3 – 0	Broughty Athletic
Neilston Juniors	3 – 1	Dufftown
Bellshill Athletic	0 – 0	Wishaw Juniors
Port Glasgow	1 – 1	Benburb

=== Replays ===
Home team	Score	Away team
West Calder United	2 – 1	Ardeer Thistle
Oakley United	4 – 0	Nairn St. Ninian
Rosyth	7 – 0	Bridge of Don Thistle
Kennoway Star Hearts	4 – 1	Vale of Leven
Broxburn Athletic	4 – 0	Maybole
Wishaw Juniors	1 – 0	Bellshill Athletic
Benburb	2 – 1	Port Glasgow

== Second round ==
The second round draw took place at Mar Hall, Erskine on 6 October 2015.

Home team	Score	Away team
St Andrews United	2 – 2	Oakley United
Thornton Hibs	1 – 1	East Craigie
Dundee Violet	7 – 1	Forth
Kilwinning Rangers	4 – 2	Ashfield
Stonehaven	2 – 0	Shotts Bon Accord
Forfar West End	0 – 2	Clydebank
Arbroath Victoria	2 – 3	Dundonald Bluebell
Shettleston	1 – 1	Kilbirnie Ladeside
Kirkcaldy YM	0 – 3	Royal Albert
Lesmahagow	3 – 4	Hill of Beath Hawthorn
Saltcoats Victoria	3 – 3	Easthouses Lily MW
Tranent Juniors	0 – 2	Auchinleck Talbot
Beith Juniors	10 – 2	Vale of Clyde
Linlithgow Rose	7 – 2	Annbank United
Lochee United	4 – 3	Maryhill
West Calder United	1 – 3	Dunipace Juniors
Kelty Hearts	5 – 0	Stoneyburn
Kilsyth Rangers	3 – 2	Culter
Bathgate Thistle	2 – 2	Greenock Juniors
Coupar Angus	0 – 0	Lossiemouth United
Ellon United	0 – 3	St Roch's
Aberdeen University	0 – 3	Dundee North End
Livingston United	2 – 1	Largs Thistle
Dunbar United	0 – 3	Irvine Meadow
Brechin Victoria	1 – 2	Penicuik Athletic
Kirkintilloch Rob Roy	0 – 3	Wishaw Juniors
Fochabers	0 – 2	Kennoway Star Hearts
Renfrew	4 – 0	Maud
Larkhall Thistle	2 – 2	Arniston Rangers
Camelon Juniors	3 – 2	Banks O' Dee
Blantyre Victoria	1 – 5	Rosyth
Neilston Juniors	2 – 0	Rutherglen Glencairn

Home team	Score	Away team
Lochore Welfare	0 – 1	Darvel
Musselburgh Athletic	7 – 1	Johnstone Burgh
Buchanhaven Hearts	0 – 4	Arthurlie
Parkvale	4 – 5	Tayport
Fauldhouse United	2 – 2	Hurlford United
Lewis United	0 – 4	Troon
St Anthony's	6 – 0	Forres Thistle
Bonnyrigg Rose Athletic	6 – 1	Montrose Roselea
Blackburn United	2 – 1	Downfield
Rossvale	2 – 0	Pumpherston
Bo'ness United	5 – 0	East End
Falkirk Juniors	4 – 0	Longside
Girvan	7 – 1	Cambuslang Rangers
Broxburn Athletic	1 – 3	Whitletts Victoria
Pollok	3 – 1	Yoker Athletic
Inverness City	1 – 3	Sauchie Juniors
Gartcairn FA Juniors	3 – 3	Hermes
Scone Thistle	1 – 1	Benburb
Colony Park	0 – 7	Carnoustie Panmure
Spey Valley	1 – 8	Cumbernauld United
Glenafton Athletic	1 – 3	Jeanfield Swifts
Fraserburgh United	1 – 3	Kinnoull
Kello Rovers	2 – 3	Cumnock Juniors
Grantown	2 – 3	Blairgowrie
Carluke Rovers	4 – 2	Lugar Boswell Thistle
Petershill	1 – 1	Newtongrange Star
Dalkeith Thistle	1 – 0	Kirriemuir Thistle
Ardrossan Winton Rovers	7 – 3	Deveronside
Glasgow Perthshire	0 – 4	Lanark United
Cruden Bay	0 – 7	Armadale Thistle
Muirkirk Juniors	3 – 2	Craigmark Burntonians
New Elgin	0 – 5	Glenrothes

=== Replays ===
Home team	Score	Away team
Oakley United	1 – 0	St Andrews United
East Craigie	3 – 2	Thornton Hibs
Kilbirnie Ladeside	2 – 0	Shettleston
Easthouses Lily MW	1 – 3	Saltcoats Victoria
Greenock Juniors	1 – 1 (3–4 p)	Bathgate Thistle
Lossiemouth United	1 – 4	Coupar Angus

Home team	Score	Away team
Arniston Rangers	3 – 1	Larkhall Thistle
Hurlford United	1 – 0	Fauldhouse United
Hermes	4 – 2	Gartcairn FA Juniors
Benburb	3 – 3 (3–4 p)	Scone Thistle
Newtongrange Star	2 – 2 (8–9 p)	Petershill

== Third round ==
The third round draw took place at The Sun offices in Glasgow on 3 November 2015.

Home team	Score	Away team
Cumnock Juniors	3 – 2	Dundonald Bluebell
Lochee United	4 – 2	Penicuik Athletic
Whitletts Victoria	1 – 5	Dalkeith Thistle
Carnoustie Panmure	5 – 0	Livingston United
Linlithgow Rose	5 – 0	Cumbernauld United
Wishaw Juniors	1 – 1	Armadale Thistle
Royal Albert	1 – 4^{1}	Pollok
Bathgate Thistle	1 – 4	Oakley United
Hurlford United	4 – 1	Falkirk Juniors
Troon	2 – 1	Bo'ness United
Girvan	0 – 0	Beith Juniors
Lanark United	0 – 5	Rossvale
Hill of Beath Hawthorn	3 – 1	Ardrossan Winton Rovers
Scone Thistle	3 – 1	Saltcoats Victoria
St Roch's	1 – 1	Kennoway Star Hearts
Kinnoull	2 – 8	Auchinleck Talbot

Home team	Score	Away team
Renfrew	4 – 1	East Craigie
Glenrothes	2 – 2	Rosyth
Jeanfield Swifts	1 – 3	Bonnyrigg Rose Athletic
Kilbirnie Ladeside	0 – 0	Dundee Violet
Petershill	1 – 0	Musselburgh Athletic
Neilston Juniors	1 – 1	Arniston Rangers
Tayport	0 – 0	Muirkirk
Irvine Meadow	6 – 2	Blackburn United
Blairgowrie	2 – 3	Darvel
Kilwinning Rangers	2 – 1	Sauchie Juniors
Stonehaven	3 – 1	St Anthony's
Arthurlie	4 – 1	Dunipace Juniors
Clydebank	0 – 1	Kelty Hearts
Dundee North End	2 – 0	Carluke Rovers
Kilsyth Rangers	1 – 4	Camelon Juniors
Coupar Angus	1 – 4	Hermes

^{1} Match played at Pollok F.C.

=== Replays ===
Home team	Score	Away team
Armadale Thistle	2 – 2 (3–5 p)	Wishaw Juniors
Beith Juniors	2 – 1	Girvan
Kennoway Star Hearts	3 – 3 (4–3 p)	St Roch's
Rosyth	0 – 0 (3–4 p)	Glenrothes

Home team	Score	Away team
Dundee Violet	1 – 4	Kilbirnie Ladeside
Arniston Rangers	2 – 1 ^{2}	Neilston Juniors
Muirkirk Juniors	0 – 5	Tayport

^{2} Match played at Tranent Juniors F.C.

== Fourth round ==
The fourth round draw took place at the Evening Times offices in Glasgow on 9 December 2015.

Home team	Score	Away team
Kennoway Star Hearts	2 – 7	Pollok
Kelty Hearts	8 – 0	Renfrew
Auchinleck Talbot	3 – 0	Cumnock Juniors
Linlithgow Rose	1 – 1	Irvine Meadow
Kilwinning Rangers	3 – 0	Arniston Rangers
Camelon Juniors	1 – 0	Dundee North End
Kilbirnie Ladeside	3 – 0	Tayport
Glenrothes	4 – 5 ^{3}	Hermes
Oakley United	0 – 1	Carnoustie Panmure
Darvel Juniors	2 – 1	Troon
Scone Thistle	1 – 5	Beith Juniors
Hill of Beath Hawthorn	0 – 3	Petershill
Hurlford United	5 – 3	Dalkeith Thistle
Rossvale	6 – 1	Stonehaven
Bonnyrigg Rose Athletic	2 – 0	Lochee United
Arthurlie	4 – 1	Wishaw Juniors

^{3} Match played at Kennoway Star Hearts F.C.

=== Replay ===
Home team	Score	Away team
Irvine Meadow	0 – 2	Linlithgow Rose

== Fifth round ==
The fifth round draw took place in Glasgow City Chambers on 26 January 2016.

Home team	Score	Away team
Beith Juniors	3 – 1	Petershill
Bonnyrigg Rose Athletic	0 – 5	Pollok
Hermes	0 – 2	Kilbirnie Ladeside
Kilwinning Rangers	4 – 1	Linlithgow Rose
Camelon Juniors	4 – 1	Kelty Hearts
Carnoustie Panmure	2 – 3	Auchinleck Talbot
Darvel Juniors	0 – 3	Arthurlie
Hurlford United	4 – 0	Rossvale

== Quarter-finals ==
The draw for the quarter-finals took place on 25 February 2016.

Home team	Score	Away team
Beith Juniors	3 – 1	Arthurlie
Kilwinning Rangers	3 – 3	Camelon Juniors
Hurlford United	2 – 0	Auchinleck Talbot
Pollok	1 – 0	Kilbirnie Ladeside

=== Replay ===
Home team	Score	Away team
Camelon Juniors	1 – 4	Kilwinning Rangers

== Semi-finals ==
The draw for the semi-finals took place on 22 March 2016.

=== First leg ===
9 April 2016
14:30

Beith Juniors	3 – 0	Kilwinning Rangers
Andy Reid 52'; Darren Christie 73'; John Sheridan 83'

Bellsdale Park, Beith
Attendance: 1,450
Referee: Steven Reid

16 April 2016
14:30

Hurlford United	0 – 0	Pollok
	Report

Blair Park, Hurlford
Attendance: 800
Referee: Craig Napier

=== Second leg ===
16 April 2016
14:30

Kilwinning Rangers	1 – 0	Beith Juniors
Ross Stewart 50'

Abbey Park, Kilwinning

23 April 2016
14:30

Pollok	0 – 0	Hurlford United
Penalties
McAleenan (penalty scored); Hanlon (penalty missed); Gallacher (penalty missed); Winters (penalty scored); Hepburn (penalty scored); Sideserf (penalty scored)	4–3	(penalty scored) R.Robertson; (penalty missed) Kean; (penalty missed) McKenzie; (penalty scored) McClune; (penalty scored) Chisholm; (penalty missed) C.Robertson

Newlandsfield Park, Glasgow
Attendance: 1,650
Referee: Scott Millar

== Final ==
The Final of The ETHX Energy Junior Cup was played at Rugby Park, Kilmarnock on Sunday 29 May with a 4.05pm kick off. The game was televised live by BBC ALBA.

29 May 2016
16:05

Beith Juniors	1 – 1	Pollok
Darren Christie 61'	The Herald	72' Robbie Winters
Penalties
McLean (penalty missed); Collins (penalty scored); Frize (penalty scored); Wilson (penalty scored); Burke (penalty scored)	4–3	(penalty scored) McAleenan; (penalty scored) Sideserf; (penalty missed) Mackenzie; (penalty missed) D. Winters; (penalty scored) R. Winters

Rugby Park, Kilmarnock
Attendance: 4,877
Referee: Graham Beaton

1	Stephen Grindlay
2	Iain Fisher
3	Nicky Docherty
4	Kevin MacDonald
5	John Sheridan
6	Tommy Martin (substituted off) 19'
7	Darren Christie (substituted off) 84'
8	Paul Frize
9	Kenny McLean
10	Andy Reid (substituted off) 77'
11	Richie Burke
Substitutes:
12	David McGowan (substituted in) 77'
14	Jamie Wilson (substituted in) 19'
16	Thomas Collins (substituted in) 84'
17	Josh McArthur
18	Zander Ryan
Manager:
John Millar

1	Jordan Longmuir
2	Tam Hanlon
3	Mark Sideserf
4	Paul Gallacher
5	Chris Walker
6	Findlay Frye
7	Kevin Bradley (substituted off) 85'
8	Colin Williamson (substituted off) 71'
9	David Winters
10	Carlo Monti (substituted off) 71'
11	Kieran McAleenan
Substitutes:
12	Ross McCabe
14	Robbie Winters (substituted in) 71'
15	Liam Rowan (substituted in) 71'
16	Derek Hepburn
17	Allan Mackenzie (substituted in) 85'
Manager:
Tony McInally
