= 2019–20 Scottish Junior Cup =

2019–20 Macron Scottish Junior Cup
Tournament details
- Country: Scotland
- Teams: 132

Tournament statistics
- Matches played: 141
- Goals scored: 625 (4.43 per match)
- All statistics correct as of 7 March 2020.

The 2019–20 Scottish Junior Cup was the 134th season of the Scottish Junior Cup, the national knockout tournament for member clubs of the Scottish Junior Football Association (SJFA). The competition was sponsored by Macron in the second year of a three-year deal and was known as the Macron Scottish Junior Cup.

A total of 132 clubs entered the competition, which was three more than the previous season despite two teams leaving for the East of Scotland League. This was due to the return of Cruden Bay and Johnstone Burgh plus Bo'ness United Junior, Linlithgow Rose Community, Sauchie Juniors Community, and Syngenta joining the East Region.

Auchinleck Talbot were the defending champions.

On 13 March 2020, the competition was indefinitely suspended at the semi-final stage due to the COVID-19 pandemic. Almost a year later and with no further matches played in the tournament, the competition was officially cancelled on 5 March 2021.

== Calendar ==
The dates for each round of the 2019–20 tournament is as follows:

Round	Date	Matches	Clubs	New entries this round
First round	14 September 2019	4	132 → 128	128
Second round	28 September 2019	64	128 → 64	4
Third round	26 October 2019	32	64 → 32	none
Fourth round	23 November 2019	16	32 → 16	none
Fifth round	25 January 2020	8	16 → 8	none
Quarter-finals	22 February 2020	4	8 → 4	none
Semi-finals	not played	4	4 → 2	none
Final	not played	1	2 → 1	none

Drawn matches are replayed and replays that end in a draw proceed direct to a penalty shootout, there is no extra time. Semi-finals are played home and away over two legs with the winner on aggregate progressing to the final. If the aggregate score is tied at the end of the second leg, the match will also proceed direct to a penalty shootout.

== First round ==
=== Draw ===
The four Junior clubs competing in the Scottish Cup were not included in the draw for the first round:

- Auchinleck Talbot - Junior Cup holders and West Region Premiership champions
- Lochee United - East Superleague champions

Also qualified automatically for the second round were Banks O'Dee, who achieved SFA club licensing requirements, and Girvan, who qualify automatically as historic full members of the Scottish Football Association.

The first and second round draws took place at Hampden Park, Glasgow on 13 August 2019.

=== Matches ===
Home team	Score	Away team
14 September 2018
Kilwinning Rangers	2–1	Dundee Violet
Maybole	2–3	Benburb
Neilston	4–2	Yoker Athletic
Newburgh	0–6	Whitburn

== Second round ==
Home team	Score	Away team
28 September 2019
Linlithgow Rose Community	3–2	Fraserburgh United
Stonehaven	4–0	Glentanar
Carluke Rovers	1–3	Clydebank
Girvan	5–5	Tayport
Scone Thistle	3–0	Lochee Harp
Lochore Welfare	1–2	Brechin Victoria
Arbroath Victoria	0–1	Islavale
Troon	3–1	Montrose Roselea
Glasgow Perthshire	1–2	Broughty Athletic
Johnstone Burgh	4–2	Armadale Thistle
Lugar Boswell Thistle	3–0	Newmachar United
Dundee North End	4–1	Whitburn
Sauchie Juniors Community	1–2	Hermes
Maryhill	2–4	Forfar West End
Ardeer Thistle	0–11	Rutherglen Glencairn
St Roch's	0–0	Renfrew
Kirkcaldy & Dysart	1–1	Saltcoats Victoria
New Elgin	1–2	St Anthony's
Gartcairn	5–2	Lanark United
Dyce	2–1	Sunnybank
Aberdeen East End	3–1	Port Glasgow
Blantyre Victoria	2–0	Muirkirk
Spey Valley United	0–5	Lesmahagow
Glenafton Athletic	13–0	West Calder United
Aberdeen University	4–5	Dalry Thistle
Livingston United	0–1	Shotts Bon Accord
Fauldhouse United	2–1	Carnoustie Panmure
Irvine Victoria	0–3	Kello Rovers
Largs Thistle	1–0	Luncarty
Vale of Clyde	0–2	Darvel
Syngenta	1–6	Shettleston
Kennoway Star Hearts	0–1	Larkhall Thistle
Kilwinning Rangers	2–2	Bridge of Don Thistle
Irvine Meadow	1–0	Buchanhaven Hearts

Home team	Score	Away team
28 September 2019
Cambuslang Rangers	7–0	Harthill Royal
Cumbernauld United	0–1	Hurlford United
Blairgowrie	1–2	Stoneywood Parkvale
Ardrossan Winton Rovers	3–0	Royal Albert
Downfield	2–1	Greenock
Arthurlie	1–5	Beith
Forfar Albion	4–5	Bathgate Thiste
Bellshill Athletic	0–7	Auchinleck Talbot
Forres Thistle	0–3	Pollok
Dundee East Craigie	6–1	Nairn St Ninian
Kilbirnie Ladeside	3–1	Vale of Leven
Neilston	4–4	Forth Wanderers
Burghead Thistle	2–2	Lochgelly Albert
Cumnock	0–2	Rossvale
Petershill	6–0	Newmains United
Thornton Hibs	3–1	Rosyth
Hall Russell United	0–3	Lochee United
5 October 2019
Kirkintilloch Rob Roy	2–1	Pumpherston
Dufftown	2–1	East Kilbride Thistle
Cruden Bay	0–4	Banchory St Ternan
Colony Park	3–6	Ashfield
Craigmark Burntonians	0–2	Kilsyth Rangers
Wishaw	1–1	Culter
Deveronside	0–0	Benburb
Annbank United	1–6	Whitletts Victoria
Ellon United	0–0	Bo'ness United Junior
Buckie Rovers	2–1	Stoneyburn
Longside	6–1	Whitehills
12 October 2019
Maud	0–3	Kirriemuir Thistle
26 October 2019
Thorniewood United	2–6	Banks O' Dee

Notes

1. A-Irvine Meadow were awarded the tie as Buchanaven Hearts were unable to field a team.

=== Replays ===
Home team	Score	Away team
5 October 2019
Tayport	2–0	Girvan
Renfrew	0–1	St Roch's
Saltcoats Victoria	0–2	Kirkcaldy & Dysart
Bridge of Don Thistle	3–1	Kilwinning Rangers
Forth Wanderers	3–3 (3–5pens.)	Neilston
Lochgelly Albert	3–4	Burghead Thistle
12 October 2019
Benburb	11–0	Deveronside
Bo'ness United Junior	2–2 (2–4pens.)	Ellon United
Culter	4–2	Wishaw

== Third round ==
Home team	Score	Away team
26 October 2019
Aberdeen East End	1–1	Scone Thistle
Ashfield	4–1	Lugar Boswell Thistle
Auchinleck Talbot	3–0	Forfar West End
Banchory St Ternan	1–6	Larkhall Thistle
Bathgate Thiste	1–3	Irvine Meadow
Beith	7–2	Whitletts Victoria
Benburb	2–1	Dyce
Brechin Victoria	0–2	Neilston
Bridge of Don Thistle	4–1	Ardrossan Winton Rovers
Broughty Athletic	5–1	St Anthony's
Buckie Rovers	1–7	Blantyre Victoria
Burghead Thistle	0–2	Kirkintilloch Rob Roy
Cambuslang Rangers	2–1	Dundee East Craigie
Culter	0–1	Rossvale
Dalry Thistle	1–2	Dundee North End
Dufftown	1–4	Johnstone Burgh
Dundee Downfield	3–4	Tayport

Home team	Score	Away team
26 October 2019
Gartcairn	1–0	Kilbirnie Ladeside
Islavale	3–4	Rutherglen Glencairn
Kirkcaldy & Dysart	1–2	Darvel
Kirriemuir Thistle	3–1	Largs Thistle
Lesmahagow	0–2	St Roch's
Linlithgow Rose Community	0–2	Pollok
Longside	1–6	Stoneywood Parkvale
Petershill	1–0	Clydebank
Shettleston	0–0	Kello Rovers
Shotts Bon Accord	2–2	Hurlford United
Stonehaven	0–4	Ellon United
Thornton Hibs	1–2	Fauldhouse United
Troon	5–4	Kilsyth Rangers
2 November 2019
Glenafton Athletic	2–1	Banks O' Dee
Lochee United	3–1	Hermes

=== Replays ===
Home team	Score	Away team
2 November 2019
Hurlford United	3–1	Shotts Bon Accord
Kello Rovers	3–1	Shettleston
Scone Thistle	1–1 (2–4p)	Aberdeen East End

== Fourth round ==
Home team	Score	Away team
23 November 2019
Aberdeen East End	1–4	Beith
Blantyre Victoria	3–4	Darvel
Cambuslang Rangers	0–3	Broughty Athletic
Gartcairn	7–0	Ellon United
Hurlford United	3–0	Benburb
Irvine Meadow	0–0	Glenafton Athletic
Johnstone Burgh	2–3	St Roch's
Kirriemuir Thistle	1–2	Tayport

Home team	Score	Away team
Larkhall Thistle	1–3	Kello Rovers
Neilston	1–1	Lochee United
Petershill	2–2	Rutherglen Glencairn
Pollok	2–1	Troon
Stoneywood Parkvale	4–1	Ashfield
30 November 2019
Rossvale	1–2	Auchinleck Talbot
7 December 2019
Bridge of Don Thistle	2–3	Fauldhouse United
Dundee North End	0–2	Kirkintilloch Rob Roy

=== Replays ===
Home team	Score	Away team
7 December 2019
Glenafton Athletic	1–1 (2–4p)	Irvine Meadow
Lochee United	1–3	Neilston
Rutherglen Glencairn	0–4	Petershill

== Fifth round ==
Home team	Score	Away team
25 January 2020
Auchinleck Talbot	2–1	Tayport
Broughty Athletic	2–1	St Roch's
Hurlford United	5–1	Gartcairn
Kello Rovers	2–1	Irvine Meadow
Kirkintilloch Rob Roy	0–1	Neilston
Petershill	1–1	Darvel
Pollok	4–0	Fauldhouse United
Stoneywood Parkvale	0–4	Beith

=== Replay ===
Home team	Score	Away team
1 February 2020
Darvel	2–1	Petershill

== Quarter-finals ==
Home team	Score	Away team
29 February 2020
Beith	4–1	Kello Rovers
Neilston	1–4	Pollok
7 March 2020
Darvel	2–2	Broughty Athletic
14 March 2020
Auchinleck Talbot	cancelled	Hurlford United

=== Replay ===
Home team	Score	Away team
14 March 2020
Broughty Athletic	cancelled	Darvel

== Semi-finals ==
The semi-finals were originally scheduled to be held on 28 March and 4 April 2020. The draw made on 17 March 2020. However no further matches were played and the competition was cancelled on 5 March 2021.

=== First leg ===
Beith	v	Darvel or Broughty Athletic

Bellsdale Park, Beith

Pollok	v	Auchinleck Talbot or Hurlford United

Newlandsfield, Glasgow

=== Second leg ===
Auchinleck Talbot or Hurlford United	v	Pollok

Darvel or Broughty Athletic	v	Beith

== Final ==
The Scottish Junior Cup final was cancelled for the first time since the 1918 tournament.
