= 2019–20 North Superleague =

McBookie.com North Superleague
- Season: 2019–20
- Champions: None
- Matches: 127
- Goals: 497 (3.91 per match)
- Biggest home win: Bridge of Don Thistle 9–0 Ellon United
- Biggest away win: Colony Park 3–13 Banks O' Dee (1 Feb 2020)
- Highest scoring: Colony Park 3–13 Banks O' Dee (1 Feb 2020)
- Longest winning run: 16 matches: Banks O' Dee
- Longest unbeaten run: 16 matches: Banks O' Dee

The 2019–20 North Superleague (known as the McBookie.com North Superleague for sponsorship reasons) was the 19th season of the North Superleague, the top tier of league competition for SJFA North Region member clubs. Banks O' Dee were the reigning champions.

On 13 March 2020, the Scottish football season was suspended with immediate effect due to the COVID-19 pandemic.

On 1 May 2020, SJFA North Region clubs voted to declare declared the 2019–20 season null and void.

== Teams and locations ==
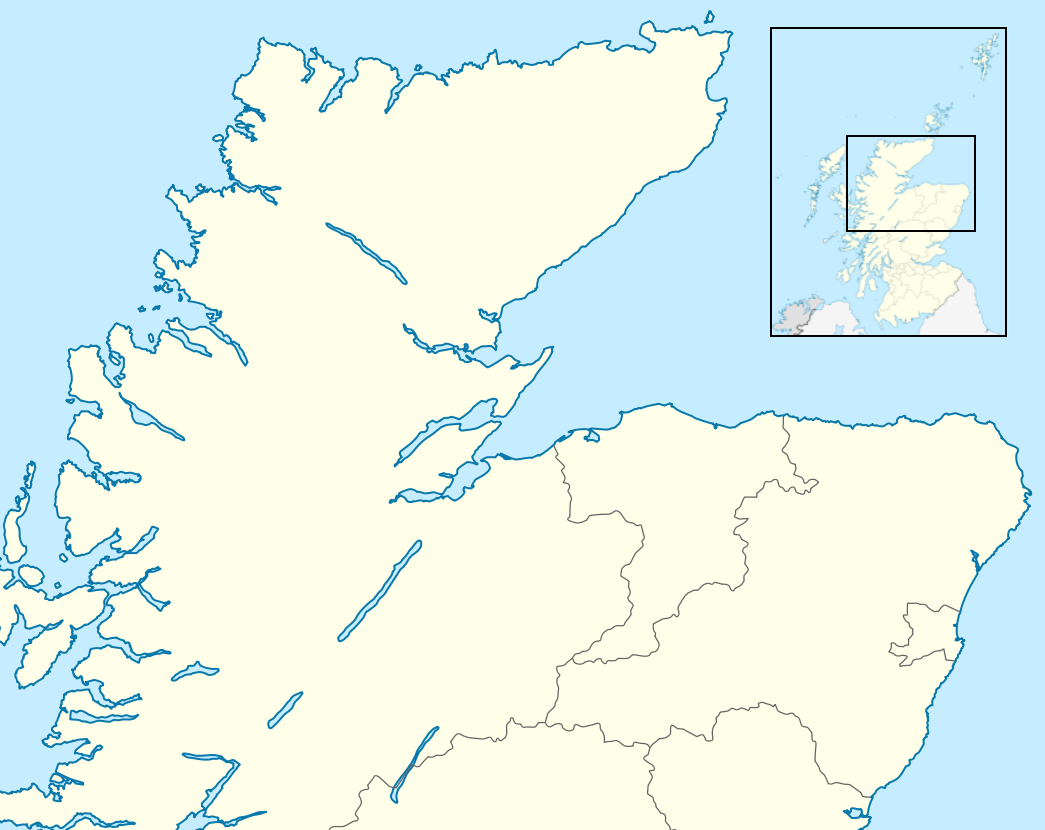
Location of teams in 2019–20 North Superleague
Location of teams in 2019–20 North Superleague in Aberdeen

The following teams changed division after the 2018–19 season.

=== To North Superleague ===
Promoted from North First Division

- Banchory St. Ternan
- Deveronside

=== From North Superleague ===
Relegated to North First Division

- Dufftown
- Stonehaven

Club	Location	Ground	Capacity	Seats	Floodlit	Manager	Finishing position 2018–19
Banchory St Ternan	Banchory	Milton Park	1,000	0	No	Ewan Robb	1st in North First Division
Banks O' Dee	Aberdeen	Spain Park	600	100	Yes	Tommy Forbes & Jamie Watt	1st
Bridge of Don Thistle	Aberdeen	Aberdeen Sports Village	2,000	500	No	Lewis Muirhead	2nd
Colony Park	Inverurie	Colony Park	1,000	0	No	Richard Davidson	9th
Culter	Peterculter	Crombie Park	1,000	40	No	Lee Youngson	5th
Deveronside	Macduff	Myrus Centre	500	100	Yes	John McLeay & Michael Duncan	2nd in North First Division
Dyce Juniors	Dyce	Ian Mair Park	1,200	0	No	Allan Youngson & Ritchie Clark	8th
East End	Aberdeen	New Advocates Park	1,000	0	No	Stuart Whicher	11th
Ellon United	Ellon	The Meadows	600	0	No	Tommy Robertson	12th
Hall Russell United	Bridge of Don	Denmore Park	1,600	0	No	John Carroll and Iain Hay	10th
Hermes	Bridge of Don	Uniconn Park	1,500	0	Yes	Neil Dawson	4th
Maud	Maud	Maud Pleasure Park	1,000	0	No	Kevin Park	6th
Montrose Roselea	Montrose	Links Park	4,936	1,338	Yes	Liam Annat	3rd
Nairn St. Ninian	Nairn	Showfield Park	1,000	0	No	Mike Hendry	7th

== League table at time of abandonment ==
The league was suspended in March 2020 and declared null and void on 1 May with no champion declared and no relegation.

Pos	Team	Pld	W	D	L	GF	GA	GD	Pts
1	Banks O' Dee	16	16	0	0	74	12	+62	48
2	Culter	16	10	4	2	39	18	+21	34
3	Hermes	16	10	4	2	40	21	+19	34
4	Nairn St. Ninian	21	8	7	6	44	50	−6	31
5	Bridge of Don Thistle	17	9	3	5	41	26	+15	30
6	Dyce Juniors	18	7	6	5	34	28	+6	27
7	Montrose Roselea	20	8	4	8	36	28	+8	28
8	Deveronside	20	7	4	9	41	45	−4	25
9	Colony Park	21	6	3	12	38	63	−25	21
10	East End	20	6	6	8	27	32	−5	24
11	Banchory St Ternan	14	4	6	4	14	22	−8	18
12	Hall Russell United	19	2	7	10	25	41	−16	13
13	Ellon United	19	3	4	12	27	55	−28	13
14	Maud	17	2	0	15	17	56	−39	6

Source: North Region SJFA
Rules for classification: 1) Points; 2) Goal difference; 3) Goals scored.

== Results ==
Home \ Away	BST	BAN	BOD	COL	CUL	DEV	DYC	EAS	ELL	HAL	HER	MAU	MON	NAI
Banchory St Ternan				4–2			0–3	1–3	1–1	1–0	2–2	0–2		
Banks O' Dee	6–0			6–3	2–1	4–1	2–0	2–0		5–0		4–0	3–1	8–1
Bridge of Don Thistle	1–1	1–2		8–2				1–0	9–0			6–1	2–0	3–2
Colony Park	0–1	3–13	0–1			3–1	1–0	2–1		2–2		2–0	0–3	1–2
Culter			2–2	4–1				4–2	1–0	1–1				5–2
Deveronside		0–8	3–1	3–1	0–1		2–3	1–2	7–1	2–0	2–2	6–1	2–2	
Dyce Juniors	0–0		5–0	2–2	1–4	1–1		0–1		2–1	1–4	3–2	4–0	
East End	1–1	0–2	0–1		2–2	3–2			1–0	2–2			1–2	3–3
Ellon United				2–2	1–5	1–2		2–2		5–0	0–2	2–4	1–0	3–4
Hall Russell United		0–4	3–3		1–1		1–1		7–0		1–2	4–2		1–2
Hermes		1–3		4–1	0–3		5–5	2–0	2–1	4–0		2–0	4–1	4–1
Maud			0–1	0–6		1–5		1–2	1–3				0–1	2–3
Montrose Roselea	0–0		2–1	0–2	0–1	5–0	0–1		3–2	0–0		6–0		5–0
Nairn St. Ninian	1–2		3–0	5–2	3–0	1–1	2–2	1–1	2–2	2–1	0–0		4–4	

Source: North Region SJFA
Legend: Blue = home team win; Yellow = draw; Red = away team win.
