= 2018–19 North Superleague =

McBookie.com Superleague
- Season: 2018–19
- Champions: Banks O' Dee
- Relegated: Dufftown; Stonehaven
- Matches: 182
- Goals: 707 (3.88 per match)
- Biggest home win: Banks O' Dee 10–0 Dufftown (27 Jan 2019)
- Biggest away win: Culter 1–8 Banks O' Dee (3 Nov 2018)
- Highest scoring: Culter 10–2 Nairn St. Ninian (30 Mar 2019)
- Longest winning run: 14 matches: Banks O' Dee
- Longest unbeaten run: 20 matches: Banks O' Dee
- Longest winless run: 11 matches: East End, Ellon United, Stonehaven
- Longest losing run: 7 matches: East End, Ellon United
- All statistics correct as of 14 May 2019.

The 2018–19 North Superleague (known as the McBookie.com North Superleague for sponsorship reasons) was the 18th season of the North Superleague, the top tier of league competition for SJFA North Region member clubs.

Banks O' Dee were the reigning champions. The winners of this competition are eligible to enter the 2019–20 Scottish Cup at the preliminary round stage.

== Teams and locations ==
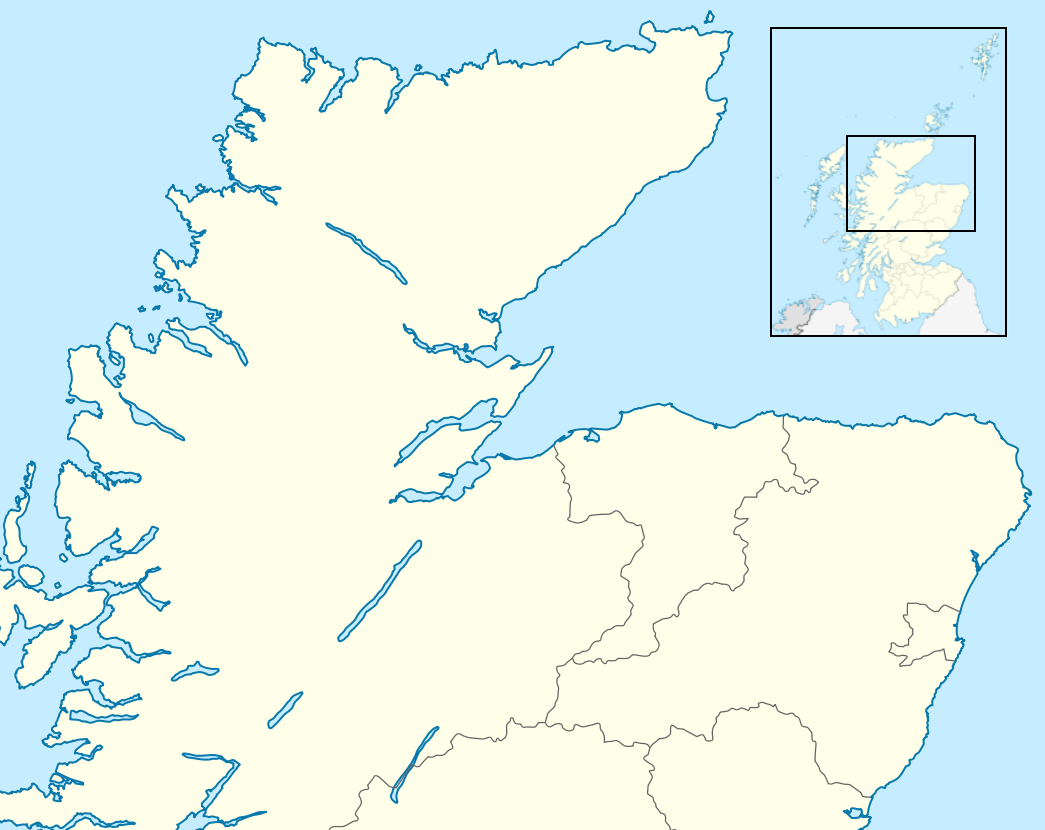
Location of teams in 2018–19 North Superleague
Location of teams in 2018–19 North Superleague in Aberdeen

The following teams have changed division since the 2017–18 season.

=== To North Superleague ===
Promoted from North First Division (East)

- East End

Promoted from North First Division (West)

- Nairn St. Ninian

=== From North Superleague ===
Relegated to North First Division

- Banchory St. Ternan

In Abeyance

- Inverness City

Club	Location	Ground	Capacity	Seats	Floodlit	Manager	Finishing position 2017–18
Banks O' Dee	Aberdeen	Spain Park	600	100	Yes	Tommy Forbes & Jamie Watt	1st
Bridge of Don Thistle	Aberdeen	Aberdeen Sports Village	2,000	500	No	Lewis Muirhead	12th
Colony Park	Inverurie	Colony Park	1,000	0	No	Richard Davidson	11th
Culter	Peterculter	Crombie Park	1,000	40	No	Lee Youngson	4th
Dufftown	Dufftown	Westburn Park	2,000		No	Michael Morrison	8th
Dyce Juniors	Dyce	Ian Mair Park	1,200	0	No	Allan Youngson & Ritchie Clark	3rd
East End	Aberdeen	New Advocates Park	1,000	0	No	Stuart Whicher	1st in North Division One (East)
Ellon United	Ellon	The Meadows	600	0	No	Steven Main	5th
Hall Russell United	Bridge of Don	Denmore Park	1,600	0	No	John Carroll	10th
Hermes	Bridge of Don	Uniconn Park	1,500	0	Yes	Neil Dawson	2nd
Maud	Maud	Maud Pleasure Park	1,000	0	No	Robbie Wildgoose	6th
Montrose Roselea	Montrose	Links Park	4,936	1,338	Yes	James Collier	7th
Nairn St. Ninian	Nairn	Showfield Park	1,000	0	No	Mike Hendry	1st in North Division One (West)
Stonehaven	Stonehaven	Glenury Park	1,300	0	No	Martyn Rollo	9th

== League table ==
Pos	Team	Pld	W	D	L	GF	GA	GD	Pts	Qualification or relegation
1	Banks O' Dee (C)	26	23	2	1	113	20	+93	71	Qualification for the 2019–20 Scottish Cup
2	Bridge of Don Thistle	26	17	2	7	72	37	+35	53	
3	Montrose Roselea	26	15	6	5	48	26	+22	51	
4	Hermes	26	14	3	9	49	42	+7	45	
5	Culter	26	13	5	8	58	41	+17	44	
6	Maud	26	11	2	13	49	64	−15	35	
7	Nairn St. Ninian	26	10	3	13	51	64	−13	33	
8	Dyce Juniors	26	8	8	10	45	44	+1	32	
9	Colony Park	26	9	4	13	39	55	−16	31	
10	Hall Russell United	26	7	6	13	31	38	−7	27	
11	East End	26	7	6	13	34	63	−29	27	
12	Ellon United	26	7	3	16	41	67	−26	24	
13	Dufftown (R)	26	7	2	17	43	88	−45	23	Relegation to the North First Division
14	Stonehaven (R)	26	6	4	16	34	58	−24	22	Relegation to the North First Division

Source: North Region SJFA
Rules for classification: 1) Points; 2) Goal difference; 3) Goals scored.
(C) Champions; (R) Relegated

== Results ==
Home \ Away	BAN	BOD	COL	CUL	DUF	DYC	EAS	ELL	HAL	HER	MAU	MON	NAI	STO
Banks O' Dee		1–2	7–0	1–0	10–0	2–0	4–0	4–0	3–0	6–3	8–1	4–1	3–2	5–0
Bridge of Don Thistle	2–3		4–0	3–1	5–1	5–0	2–0	5–4	2–0	0–2	4–0	1–1	6–2	1–1
Colony Park	1–3	3–2		1–2	3–2	0–0	1–1	2–1	1–0	1–3	4–2	1–2	5–4	3–1
Culter	1–8	7–1	1–0		2–1	0–0	3–1	2–3	1–0	4–1	4–2	0–1	10–2	1–0
Dufftown	0–5	4–1	3–4	0–4		2–4	4–2	3–2	1–1	2–3	0–2	2–5	2–4	4–1
Dyce Juniors	2–2	3–1	3–3	2–2	5–0		0–1	2–2	3–0	1–2	2–2	2–1	0–2	2–0
East End	0–4	0–6	4–2	2–1	2–4	0–4		3–4	1–3	2–2	3–0	1–2	1–1	3–2
Ellon United	2–8	0–2	2–1	1–1	6–2	2–1	0–1		0–3	1–2	0–3	1–3	1–1	2–0
Hall Russell United	0–5	0–1	1–2	0–1	0–0	2–2	1–2	1–0		1–1	3–0	2–1	3–1	2–2
Hermes	1–6	1–3	2–0	1–1	1–2	0–2	8–0	3–1	2–1		1–2	0–1	2–1	2–1
Maud	0–5	1–6	1–0	1–6	7–2	3–1	1–1	7–0	2–1	2–1		0–1	5–2	1–0
Montrose Roselea	1–1	1–0	0–0	3–1	6–0	5–2	0–0	2–0	1–1	0–1	2–1		2–1	1–3
Nairn St. Ninian	0–1	0–2	2–0	2–2	3–1	2–0	3–2	4–3	2–0	1–2	4–2	0–4		4–2
Stonehaven	1–4	1–5	2–1	4–0	0–1	3–2	1–1	1–3	1–5	0–2	3–1	1–1	3–1	

Updated to match(es) played on 14 May 2019. Source: North Region SJFA
Legend: Blue = home team win; Yellow = draw; Red = away team win.
