= 2021–22 North Superleague =

McBookie.com North Superleague
- Season: 2021–22
- Champions: Banks O' Dee
- Matches: 182
- Goals: 756 (4.15 per match)
- Biggest home win: Culter 11–0 Ellon United (17 July 2021); Banks O' Dee 11–0 Colony Park (14 August 2021); Banks O' Dee 12–1 Nairn St Ninian (4 December 2021)
- Biggest away win: Deveronside 0–10 Culter (12 March 2022)
- Highest scoring: Banks O' Dee 12–1 Nairn St Ninian (4 December 2021)
- Longest winning run: 13 matches: Banks O' Dee
- Longest unbeaten run: 26 matches: Banks O' Dee
- Longest winless run: 11 matches: Deveronside
- Longest losing run: 7 matches: 3 teams
- All statistics correct as of 10 May 2022.

The 2021–22 North Superleague (known as the McBookie.com North Superleague for sponsorship reasons) was the 20th season of the North Superleague, and the 1st season as the sixth tier of the Scottish football pyramid system. This is the top tier of league competition for SJFA North Region member clubs.

Banks O' Dee won the league title on 2 March 2022 thanks to a 4–0 win over Montrose Roselea at Spain Park, with five matches still to play. Banks O' Dee ultimately went on to complete an unbeaten season – the first such instance in the league's history – and set a record points tally, dropping four points during the campaign.

== North Superleague ==
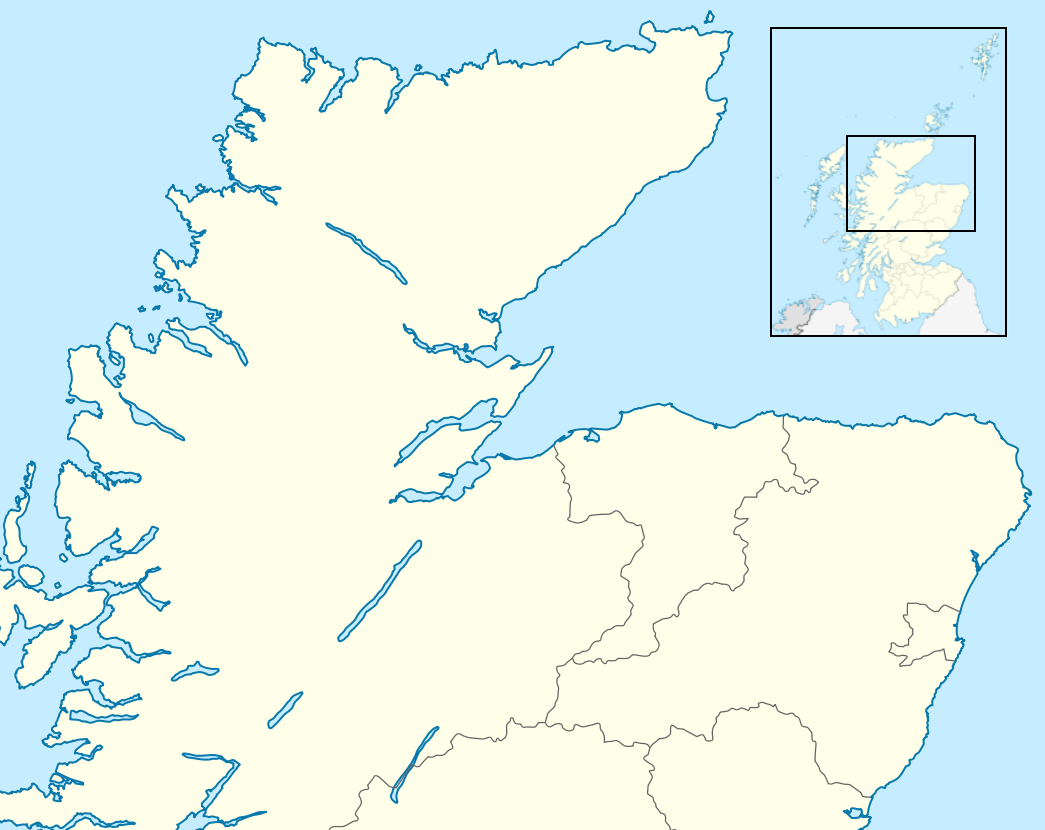
Location of teams in 2021–22 North Superleague
Location of teams in 2021–22 North Superleague in Aberdeen

=== Stadia and locations ===
Club	Location	Ground	Capacity	Seats	Floodlit
Banchory St Ternan	Banchory	Milton Park	1,000	0	No
Banks O' Dee ^{[SFA]}	Aberdeen	Spain Park	876	100	Yes
Bridge of Don Thistle	Aberdeen	Aberdeen Sports Village	2,000	500	No
Colony Park	Inverurie	Colony Park	1,000	0	No
Culter	Peterculter	Crombie Park	1,000	40	No
Deveronside	Macduff	Myrus Centre	500	100	Yes
Dyce Juniors	Dyce	Ian Mair Park	1,200	0	No
East End	Aberdeen	New Advocates Park	1,000	0	No
Ellon United	Ellon	The Meadows	600	0	No
Hall Russell United	Bridge of Don	Denmore Park	1,600	0	No
Hermes	Bridge of Don	Uniconn Park	1,500	0	Yes
Maud	Maud	Maud Pleasure Park	1,000	0	No
Montrose Roselea	Montrose	Links Park	4,936	1,338	Yes
Nairn St Ninian	Nairn	Showfield Park	1,000	0	No

The North Superleague contains the same 14 clubs which competed in the 2019–20 season (which was declared null and void). There was no Superleague season in 2020–21.

=== League table ===
Pos	Team	Pld	W	D	L	GF	GA	GD	Pts	Qualification or relegation
1	Banks O' Dee (C, P)	26	24	2	0	130	13	+117	74	Qualification for the Highland League play-off
2	Bridge of Don Thistle	26	18	4	4	63	20	+43	58	
3	Hermes	26	17	4	5	68	31	+37	55	
4	Culter	26	16	4	6	86	31	+55	52	
5	Dyce Juniors	26	12	6	8	49	36	+13	42	
6	East End	26	13	3	10	50	46	+4	42	
7	Montrose Roselea	26	10	7	9	57	52	+5	37	
8	Banchory St Ternan	26	10	5	11	39	43	−4	35	
9	Ellon United	26	7	6	13	45	77	−32	27	
10	Colony Park	26	7	3	16	35	67	−32	24	
11	Hall Russell United	26	7	1	18	31	87	−56	22	
12	Nairn St Ninian	26	5	3	18	33	74	−41	18	
13	Maud	26	4	5	17	40	79	−39	17	
14	Deveronside (Note: Deveronside deducted 3 points for breach of regulations regarding trialists.) (R)	26	4	3	19	30	100	−70	12	Relegation to the North Championship

Rules for classification: 1) Points; 2) Goal difference; 3) Goals scored.
(C) Champions; (P) Promoted; (R) Relegated

=== Results ===
Home \ Away	EAS	BST	BAN	BOD	COL	CUL	DEV	DYC	ELL	HAL	HER	MAU	MON	NAI
East End		0–2	0–5	1–3	2–0	1–2	4–1	2–0	1–1	2–1	3–2	4–2	1–2	3–0
Banchory St Ternan	1–2		0–3	2–3	1–1	0–1	1–0	1–0	1–2	1–2	0–3	2–1	1–1	2–1
Banks O' Dee	8–1	1–1		2–1	11–0	6–0	6–0	5–0	4–1	11–1	3–0	4–0	4–0	12–1
Bridge of Don Thistle	2–0	2–1	1–1		0–2	1–1	3–0	1–1	7–1	4–0	0–0	3–1	1–0	3–1
Colony Park	0–4	1–3	0–1	0–2		1–2	1–2	1–4	1–5	4–1	1–2	2–1	3–2	2–0
Culter	2–0	2–1	1–2	0–1	4–0		10–0	2–2	11–0	4–0	2–2	10–1	0–3	4–2
Deveronside	0–6	2–4	2–6	1–4	1–3	0–10		0–2	3–1	1–0	1–3	3–3	0–6	3–2
Dyce Juniors	4–1	4–0	0–4	2–0	1–2	0–1	3–1		2–1	1–1	2–2	3–2	1–0	5–1
Ellon United	0–3	4–4	0–8	0–2	4–4	2–1	4–4	1–0		4–0	1–2	0–0	3–2	3–4
Hall Russell United	1–3	1–4	0–8	0–4	4–2	0–7	2–1	1–5	1–2		1–2	5–1	2–1	1–0
Hermes	3–0	2–3	1–2	0–1	3–1	2–1	7–0	2–1	6–2	2–0		3–2	8–1	4–0
Maud	1–3	2–2	1–6	3–2	1–0 (Note: Match awarded 1–0 to Maud, as Colony Park were unable to field a team.)	0–3	1–1	1–3	3–1	4–5	1–2		2–3	4–2
Montrose Roselea	2–2	2–0	1–6	0–8 (Note: Match played at Broomfield Park, due to a 2021–22 Scottish Cup replay at home for Montrose.)	3–3	3–3	4–1	1–1	1–1	6–0	1–1	5–0		3–0
Nairn St Ninian	1–1	0–1	0–1	0–4	3–0	1–2	4–2	2–2	2–1	3–1	1–4	2–2	0–4	

Legend: Blue = home team win; Yellow = draw; Red = away team win.

== North First Division ==
The North First Division contains the same 8 clubs which competed in the 2019–20 season (which was declared null and void). There was no First Division season in 2020–21.

=== League table ===
Pos	Team	Pld	W	D	L	GF	GA	GD	Pts	Qualification or relegation
1	Stonehaven (C, P)	21	14	4	3	46	15	+31	46	Promotion to the North Superleague
2	Stoneywood Parkvale (P)	21	13	2	6	50	25	+25	41	Promotion to the North Superleague
3	Dufftown (P)	21	11	3	7	45	31	+14	36	Promotion to the North Superleague
4	Sunnybank	21	10	4	7	43	33	+10	34	
5	Fraserburgh United	21	9	1	11	41	40	+1	28	
6	Buchanhaven Hearts	21	8	2	11	29	56	−27	26	
7	Longside	21	5	4	12	31	44	−13	19	
8	Aberdeen University	21	3	2	16	25	66	−41	11	

Rules for classification: 1) Points; 2) Goal difference; 3) Goals scored.
(C) Champions; (P) Promoted

== North Second Division ==
The North Second Division contains the same 8 clubs which competed in the 2019–20 season (which was declared null and void), minus Spey Valley United in abeyance during the pandemic, but with the addition of Rothie Rovers, competing in their first league campaign after being accepted to the league in July 2020. There was no Second Division season in 2020–21.

=== League table ===
Pos	Team	Pld	W	D	L	GF	GA	GD	Pts	Qualification or relegation
1	Rothie Rovers (C)	24	19	4	1	88	19	+69	61	All clubs to form part of the North Championship
2	Forres Thistle	24	18	3	3	71	17	+54	57	All clubs to form part of the North Championship
3	Newmachar United	24	13	4	7	57	31	+26	43	All clubs to form part of the North Championship
4	Glentanar	24	10	4	10	32	47	−15	34	All clubs to form part of the North Championship
5	Burghead Thistle	24	10	3	11	39	41	−2	33	All clubs to form part of the North Championship
6	Cruden Bay	24	10	1	13	48	48	0	31	All clubs to form part of the North Championship
7	Islavale	24	9	2	13	30	42	−12	29	All clubs to form part of the North Championship
8	Whitehills	24	3	3	18	38	96	−58	12	All clubs to form part of the North Championship
9	New Elgin Juniors	24	3	2	19	19	81	−62	11	All clubs to form part of the North Championship

Rules for classification: 1) Points; 2) Goal difference; 3) Goals scored.
(C) Champions

== Notes ==
^{SFA} Club with an SFA Licence eligible to participate in the Highland League promotion play-off should they win the league.
