= 2018–19 Scottish Junior Cup =

2018–19 Macron Scottish Junior Cup
Tournament details
- Country: Scotland
- Teams: 129

Final positions
- Champions: Auchinleck Talbot
- Runners-up: Largs Thistle

Tournament statistics
- Matches played: 139
- Goals scored: 629 (4.53 per match)
- All statistics correct as of 2 June 2019.

The 2018–19 Scottish Junior Cup was the 133rd season of the Scottish Junior Cup, the national knockout tournament for member clubs of the Scottish Junior Football Association (SJFA). The competition was sponsored by Macron in the first year of a three-year deal and is known as the Macron Scottish Junior Cup.

A total of 129 clubs entered the competition, which was 28 fewer than the previous season. This was due to 25 teams leaving the Junior ranks for the East of Scotland League along with Cruden Bay, Inverness City, and Lewis United not entering the tournament.

Auchinleck Talbot were the defending champions. They successfully defended their title with a 2–0 win over Largs Thistle in the final.

== Calendar ==
The dates for each round of the 2018–19 tournament are as follows:

Round	Date	Matches	Clubs	New entries this round
First round	15 September 2018	1	129 → 128	125
Second round	29 September 2018	64	128 → 64	4
Third round	27 October 2018	32	64 → 32	none
Fourth round	24 November 2018	16	32 → 16	none
Fifth round	26 January 2019	8	16 → 8	none
Quarter-finals	23 February 2019	4	8 → 4	none
Semi-finals	30 March and 6 April 2019	4	4 → 2	none
Final	2 June 2019	1	2 → 1	none

Drawn matches are replayed and replays that end in a draw proceed direct to a penalty shootout, there is no extra time. Semi-finals are played home and away over two legs with the winner on aggregate progressing to the final. If the aggregate score is tied at the end of the second leg, the match will also proceed direct to a penalty shootout.

== First round ==
The four Junior clubs competing in the Scottish Cup were not included in the draw for the first round:

- Auchinleck Talbot - Junior Cup holders
- Beith Juniors - West of Scotland Super League Premier Division champions

Also qualified automatically for the second round were Banks O'Dee, who achieved national club licensing requirements, and Girvan, who qualify automatically as historic full members of the Scottish Football Association.

The first and second round draws took place at Hampden Park, Glasgow on 23 August 2018.

Home team	Score	Away team
15 September 2018
Colony Park	4–2	Kirriemuir Thistle

== Second round ==
Home team	Score	Away team
29 September 2018
Kinnoull	2–0	Saltcoats Victoria
Cambuslang Rangers	5–0	Fraserburgh United
Troon	5–1	Lochee Harp
Blantyre Victoria	2–2	Vale of Clyde
Auchinleck Talbot	4–2	Forfar West End
Cumnock Juniors	w/o^{1}	Coupar Angus
Cumbernauld United	1–2	Glenafton Athletic
Ellon United	3–2	Forth Wanderers
Girvan	2–0	Culter
Bellshill Athletic	4–0	Burghead Thistle
Islavale	3–0	Vale of Leven
Lochore Welfare	2–4	Fauldhouse United
Pollok	9–0	Buchanhaven Hearts
Dundee Violet	4–2	Maryhill
East End	2–1	Lochgelly Albert
New Elgin	1–1	Whitehills
Rosyth	1–0^{2}	Newmains United
Carnoustie Panmure	3–0	Longside
Kirkcaldy YMCA	0–3	Renfrew
Muirkirk	2–2	Yoker Athletic
Gartcairn	3–2^{3}	Kilbirnie Ladeside
Arthurlie	3–0	Forres Thistle
Tayport	3–1	Port Glasgow
Rutherglen Glencairn	8–0	Deveronside
Bridge of Don Thistle	2–1	Ardrossan Winton Rovers
Maybole	2–2	Aberdeen University
Kilwinning Rangers	3–1	Beith
Benburb	0–4	Broughty Athletic
Banks O'Dee	6–0	Dyce Juniors
Scone Thistle	0–1	Neilston
Hurlford United	10–0	Dufftown
Spey Valley United	2–7	Harthill Royal

Home team	Score	Away team
29 September 2018
Livingston United	0–2	Kilsyth Rangers
Glenrothes	3–0	Brechin Victoria
Wishaw	2–0	West Calder United
Hermes	4–3	Newburgh
Lochee United	6–2	Dalry Thistle
Glasgow Perthshire	1–6	St. Roch's
St. Anthony's	0–3	Irvine Meadow XI
Irvine Victoria	1–9	Kirkintilloch Rob Roy
Petershill	1–2	Darvel
Royal Albert	5–3	Lugar Boswell Thistle
Annbank United	5–0	Ardeer Thistle
Hall Russell United	4–3	Kennoway Star Hearts
Glentanar	1–3	Carluke Rovers
Colony Park	4–1	Stonehaven
Ashfield	1–0	Banchory St Ternan
Nairn St Ninian	3–0	Buckie Rovers
Clydebank	4–0	Armadale Thistle
Thornton Hibs	7–1	Stoneywood Parkvale
East Kilbride Thistle	1–0	Montrose Roselea
Arbroath Victoria	0–9	Largs Thistle
Bathgate Thistle	1–2	Craigmark Burntonians
Newmachar United	1–3	Whitburn
Kello Rovers	2–1	Blairgowrie
Shettleston	0–1	Dundee North End
Whitletts Victoria	2–2	Lanark United
Thorniewood United	0–3	Dundee East Craigie
Shotts Bon Accord	3–2	Maud
Greenock	2–5	Rossvale
Stoneyburn	2–4	Luncarty
Sunnybank	0–3	Lesmahagow
Downfield	7–1	Larkhall Thistle
Pumpherston	3–1	Forfar Albion

^{1} Tie awarded to Cumnock Juniors as Coupar Angus unable to raise side.
^{2} Tie played at Victoria Park, Newmains after Rosyth's Fleet Grounds deemed unsuitable to host match.
^{3} Tie played at Valefield Park, Kilbirnie after Gartcairn's MTC Park deemed unsuitable to host match.

=== Replays ===
Home team	Score	Away team
Vale of Clyde	0–7	Blantyre Victoria
Whitehills	1–3	New Elgin
Yoker Athletic	3–3 (4–5p)	Muirkirk
Aberdeen University	1–0	Maybole
Lanark United	2–0	Whitletts Victoria

== Third round ==
The third round draw took place at the offices of the Scottish Sun newspaper in Glasgow on 9 October 2018.

Home team	Score	Away team
27 October 2018
New Elgin	0–7	Luncarty
Pollok	0–0	Cumnock Juniors
Ashfield	4–2	Neilston
Renfrew	2–1	Fauldhouse United
Wishaw	1–1	Lanark United
Pumpherston	1–4	Blantyre Victoria
Kinnoull	0–3	Clydebank
St Roch's	4–1	Downfield
Hurlford United	2–1	Broughty Athletic
Tayport	1–5	Rossvale
Colony Park	1–6	Cambuslang Rangers
Gartcairn Juniors	0–2^{4}	Lochee United
Darvel	4–2	Whitburn
Muirkirk	2–2	Girvan
East End	0–3	Dundee North End
Largs Thistle	4–0	Shotts Bon Accord

Home team	Score	Away team
27 October 2018
Bridge of Don Thistle	3–5	Rosyth
Carnoustie Panmure	5–0	Aberdeen University
Troon	4–2	Nairn St. Ninian
Kilsyth Rangers	2–0	Irvine Meadow
Carluke Rovers	1–0	Hermes
Craigmark Burntonians	4–1	East Craigie
Ellon United	1–3	Glenafton Athletic
Royal Albert	2–2	Harthill Royal
Banks O' Dee	5–1	East Kilbride Thistle
Annbank United	2–1	Kello Rovers
Glenrothes	8–0	Hall Russell United
Kirkintilloch Rob Roy	1–3	Thornton Hibs
Arthurlie	1–3	Dundee Violet
Islavale	1–4	Rutherglen Glencairn
Kilwinning Rangers	2–0	Bellshill Athletic
3 November 2018
Auchinleck Talbot	9–1	Lesmahagow

^{4} Tie played at Petershill Park, Glasgow after Gartcairn's MTC Park deemed unsuitable to host match.

=== Replays ===
3 November 2018
Home team	Score	Away team
Cumnock Juniors	1–3	Pollok
Girvan	4–4 (6–5p)	Muirkirk
Harthill Royal	3–3 (3–5p)	Royal Albert
Lanark United	2–1	Wishaw

== Fourth round ==
Home team	Score	Away team
24 November 2018
Glenafton Athletic	0–0	Pollok
Craigmark Burntonians	2–1	Glenrothes
Carluke Rovers	1–3	Lochee United
Royal Albert	1–3	Clydebank
Kilsyth Rangers	1–3	Hurlford United
Darvel	1–2	Largs Thistle
Kilwinning Rangers	3–1	Banks O' Dee
St Roch's	3–0	Luncarty
Lanark United	1–1	Rossvale
Dundee North End	0–4	Cambuslang Rangers
Rutherglen Glencairn	7–1	Ashfield
Girvan	7–1	Dundee Violet
Rosyth	2–0	Annbank United
1 December 2018
Carnoustie Panmure	1–3	Troon
8 December 2018
Blantyre Victoria	0–4	Auchinleck Talbot
Thornton Hibs	2–0^{5}	Renfrew

^{5}Tie played at Stark's Park, Kirkcaldy.

=== Replays ===
Home team	Score	Away team
1 December 2018
Pollok	1–1 (3–0p)	Glenafton Athletic
Rossvale	3–1	Lanark United

== Fifth round ==
Home team	Score	Away team
26 January 2019
Kilwinning Rangers	6–2	Thornton Hibs
Largs Thistle	1–1	St Roch's
Cambuslang Rangers	0–1	Troon
Rossvale	1–1	Hurlford United
Pollok	8–2	Rosyth
Auchinleck Talbot	4–1	Rutherglen Glencairn
9 February 2019
Girvan	1–7	Clydebank
Craigmark Burntonians	0–4	Lochee United

=== Replays ===
Home team	Score	Away team
9 February 2019
St Roch's	2–5	Largs Thistle
Hurlford United	4–3	Rossvale

== Quarter-finals ==
Home team	Score	Away team
23 February 2019
Largs Thistle	5–0	Kilwinning Rangers
Troon	0–2	Lochee United
Hurlford United	1–1	Clydebank
Pollok	0–3	Auchinleck Talbot

=== Replay ===
Home team	Score	Away team
2 March 2019
Clydebank	1–3	Hurlford United

== Semi-finals ==
The draw for the semi-finals took place on 7 March 2019.

=== First leg ===
30 March 2019
14:30

Lochee United	1–4	Auchinleck Talbot

Thomson Park, Dundee

30 March 2019
14:30

Largs Thistle	2–2	Hurlford United

Barrfields Park, Largs

=== Second leg ===
6 April 2019
14:30

Hurlford United	1–2	Largs Thistle

Blair Park, Hurlford

Largs Thistle won 4–3 on aggregate.

6 April 2019
14:30

Auchinleck Talbot	2–0	Lochee United

Beechwood Park, Auchinleck

Auchinleck Talbot won 6–1 on aggregate.

== Final ==
The Final of the Macron Scottish Junior Cup was played at New Douglas Park, Hamilton on Sunday 2 June with a 4.10pm kick off. The game was televised live by BBC Alba. Both teams wore their away strips.

2 June 2019
16:10

Auchinleck Talbot	2–0	Largs Thistle
McCracken 3'; Samson 38'	Report

New Douglas Park, Hamilton
Attendance: 4,629
Referee: Peter Stuart
