= 2017–18 North Superleague =

McBookie.com Superleague
- Season: 2017–18
- Champions: Banks O' Dee
- Relegated: Banchory St. Ternan; Inverness City
- Matches: 182
- Goals: 669 (3.68 per match)

The 2017–18 North Superleague is the seventeenth staging of the North Superleague, the highest tier of league competition in the North Region of the Scottish Junior Football Association. The winners of this competition are eligible to enter the 2018–19 Scottish Cup.

== Member clubs for the 2017–18 season ==
Banks O' Dee are the reigning champions.

North First Division (East) champions Ellon United were promoted to the Superleague, however the West champions Spey Valley United declined promotion. An extra play-off spot would decide promotion/relegation. This spots would between North Superleague Clubs Dufftown and Buckie Rovers and in the North First Division (West) and (East) runners up Sunnybank and Montrose Roselea respectively. Dufftown defeated Sunnybank 3–2 to retain their Superleague place while Montrose Roselea were promoted after a 5–0 win over Buckie Rovers played at Colony Park.

Club	Location	Ground	Manager	Finishing position 2016–17
Banchory St. Ternan	Crathes	Milton Park	Steve Scott	9th
Banks O' Dee	Aberdeen	Spain Park	Tommy Forbes & Sandy McNaughton	1st
Colony Park	Inverurie	Colony Park	Richard Davidson	7th
Culter	Peterculter	Crombie Park	Duncan Ord	3rd
Dufftown	Dufftown	Westburn Park	Michael Morrison	12th
Dyce Juniors	Dyce	Ian Mair Park	Mike McKenzie & Murray Rattray	2nd
Ellon United	Ellon	The Meadows	Steven Main	North First Division (East) 1st
Hall Russell United	Bridge of Don	Denmore Park	John Carroll	5th
Hermes	Bridge of Don	Uniconn Park	Neil Dawson	8th
Inverness City	Inverness	Lister Park	Jordan MacDonald	10th
Maud	Maud	Maud Pleasure Park	Allan Hale	11th
Montrose Roselea	Montrose	Broomfield Park	James Collier	North First Division (West) 2nd
Newburgh Thistle	Newburgh	Gallowshill Park	Lewis Muirhead	6th
Stonehaven	Stonehaven	Glenury Park	Ian Esslemont	4th

== League table ==
Pos	Team	Pld	W	D	L	GF	GA	GD	Pts	Qualification or relegation
1	Banks O' Dee (C)	26	22	3	1	81	22	+59	69	Qualification for 2018–19 Scottish Cup
2	Hermes	26	14	8	4	68	41	+27	50	
3	Dyce Juniors	26	13	6	7	57	38	+19	45	
4	Culter	26	14	2	10	52	40	+12	44	
5	Ellon United	26	12	3	11	41	41	0	39	
6	Maud	26	11	3	12	45	56	−11	36	
7	Montrose Roselea	26	9	8	9	36	31	+5	35	
8	Dufftown	26	11	2	13	50	57	−7	35	
9	Stonehaven	26	8	8	10	50	55	−5	32	
10	Hall Russell United	26	8	7	11	29	41	−12	31	
11	Colony Park	26	8	5	13	43	63	−20	29	
12	Newburgh Thistle (O)	26	7	6	13	45	49	−4	27	Qualification for North Region League play-off
13	Banchory St. Ternan (R)	26	6	4	16	41	71	−30	22	Relegation to North First Division
14	Inverness City (R)	26	5	3	18	31	74	−43	18	Relegation to North First Division

Updated to match(es) played on 28 June 2018. Source: North Region JFA
Rules for classification: 1) points; 2) goal difference; 3) number of goals scored.
(C) Champions; (O) Play-off winners; (R) Relegated

== Results ==
Home \ Away	BST	BOD	COL	CUL	DUF	DYC	ELL	HRU	HER	IVC	MAU	MON	NEW	SHV
Banchory St. Ternan		1–2	3–4	2–5	2–1	2–2	2–2	2–3	0–2	3–2	1–4		1–2	2–2
Banks O' Dee	10–0		5–0	2–1	6–1	0–2	3–0	5–0	3–0	4–1		1–0	3–2	5–2
Colony Park	1–3	1–3		0–4	3–2	1–5	0–5	1–1	0–4		2–1	0–2	1–3	0–6
Culter	0–2				3–1		4–2	2–0		4–0		0–0	1–0	0–1
Dufftown	3–1	1–6	2–5	1–3				1–2					1–3	
Dyce Juniors	5–3	0–0		1–2	3–1		1–2	2–2		2–4	2–3		4–1	2–0
Ellon United	2–2	0–3	3–2	2–1	0–3	0–1		3–1	2–3	1–0	2–0	1–3	3–1	
Hall Russell United	2–0	0–3	0–3	1–0		0–3	1–2		3–4		0–0	0–0	2–0	2–1
Hermes	3–1	3–4	2–2	4–0	2–2	3–0	1–0	0–0			2–2	2–1	1–3	3–1
Inverness City	1–2	1–4	0–4	0–2		0–5	0–1	0–0	1–4		1–2	0–5	2–1	1–1
Maud	4–1	2–3	0–4	2–5		0–1	2–0	2–1	3–7	1–2				3–4
Montrose Roselea	4–1	1–1	0–0	2–4	1–2	1–2	1–2	2–0		0–4	1–2		2–2	1–1
Newburgh Thistle	0–1	2–2	2–2		2–5	2–2		2–3	4–2		2–3			1–2
Stonehaven			2–0		1–2		3–2	1–4	3–3	3–1	3–3	1–1		

Updated to match(es) played on 28 April 2018. Source: North Region JFA
Legend: Blue = home team win; Yellow = draw; Red = away team win.

=== Superleague play-offs ===
==== Semi-final ====
26 May 2018
14:00

Sunnybank	1 – 0	Deveronside
Burnett	Report

Davidson Park, Longside

==== Final ====
1 June 2018
19:30

Newburgh Thistle	1 – 1	Sunnybank
Goal	Report	Youngson
Penalties
	6 – 5

Gallowshill Park, Newburgh
