= North Region Junior Football League =

- Founded: 2001
- Folded: 2025
- Country: Scotland
- Level on pyramid: 6–7/8
- Promotion to: Highland League
- Domestic cup(s): Scottish Cup (SFA licensed clubs and Premier League winners); Scottish Junior Cup
- Last champions: Culter (10th title) (2024–25)
- Most championships: Culter (10 titles)
- Website: SJFA North Region
- Current: 2024–25 North Region Junior Football League

The North Region Junior Football League was a football league based in the north east of Scotland. It was formed in 2001 as a replacement for the North Junior Football League.

Geographically, the league covered Aberdeen City, Aberdeenshire and Moray.

Following the integration of Junior football into the league system in 2021–22, the league sat at levels 6–7/8 on the Scottish football league system, and acted as a feeder to the Highland Football League.

The league disbanded in 2025 after the SJFA North Region announced they would no longer run the league, and the newly independent North of Scotland Football League was created to serve as a direct successor for the region.

== League system ==
When the league was founded in 2001, it consisted of the Super League (tier 1), with Division 1 (tier 2) below. The Division 1 was split geographically into an East League and a North League.

After two seasons of this format, Division 1 was combined into a single league, and a new Division 2 (tier 3) was created. This lasted until 2013, when Division 1 was once again split geographically, this time into an East League and a West League.

In 2018, the league returned to the previous setup with a Division 1 and a Division 2 below the Super League.

For season 2020-21, due to the COVID-19 pandemic, the league adopted a regional system consisting of 4 leagues (Aberdeen North Division, Aberdeen South Division, Banff & Buchan Division and West Division). However, the season was ultimately declared null and void.

In 2022, the Super League changed for the first time ever, being re-named the Premier League. The two tiers beneath were combined into a single Championship. The league maintained this structure until it was folded.

The final system saw two clubs automatically relegated from the Premier League, who were replaced by two clubs from the Championship. The third-bottom club in the Premier League entered a promotion/relegation play-off with the clubs who finished between third and fifth in the Championship. In the two-leg semi-finals, the Premier League side played the fifth-placed Championship side, and the third and fourth-placed teams played each other. The semi-final winners then progressed to a single-leg final.

== Member clubs for the 2024–25 season ==
=== Premier League ===
Club	Location	Ground	Finishing position 2024–25 (NRJFA)
Banks o' Dee Juniors	Aberdeen	Spain Park	11th
Bridge of Don Thistle	Aberdeen	Aberdeen Sports Village	3rd
Buchanhaven Hearts	Peterhead	Raemoss Park	9th
Colony Park	Inverurie	Colony Park	8th
Culter	Peterculter	Crombie Park	1st (champions)
Dyce	Dyce	Ian Mair Park	4th
East End	Aberdeen	New Advocates Park	12th
Ellon United	Ellon	The Meadows	6th
Hermes	Bridge of Don	Lochside Park	2nd
Islavale	Keith	Simpson Park	14th
Longside	Longside	Davidson Park	2nd in Championship
Lossiemouth United	Lossiemouth	Phoenix Park	1st in Championship
Maud	Maud	Maud Pleasure Park	5th
Sunnybank	Aberdeen	Heathryfold Park	13th
Stonehaven	Stonehaven	Glenury Park	7th
Rothie Rovers	Rothienorman	Forgue Road	10th

=== Championship ===
Club	Location	Ground	Finishing position 2024–25 (NRJFA)
Banchory St Ternan	Banchory	Milton Park	6th
Burghead Thistle	Burghead	Forest Park	9th
Cruden Bay	Cruden Bay	Watson Park	14th
Deveronside	Banff	Myrus Centre	4th
Dufftown	Dufftown	Westburn Park	10th
Forres Thistle	Forres	Logie Park	13th
Fraserburgh United	Fraserburgh	College Park	16th in Premier League
Glentanar	Woodside	Woodside Sports Complex	12th
Hall Russell United	Bridge of Don	Denmore Park	3rd
Nairn St Ninian	Nairn	Showfield Park	7th
New Elgin	Elgin	Nicol-Togneri Park	8th
Newmachar United	Newmachar	Charles Gordon Park	15th in Premier League
Stoneywood Parkvale	Aberdeen	Clark Commercial Park	5th
Westdyke CC Juniors	Westhill	Lawsondale	11th
Whitehills	Whitehills	School Park	15th

== Champions and season summaries ==
Year	Winner	Runners-up	Relegated	Promoted	Champions' progression in Scottish Cup
2001–02	Formartine United	Culter	Buchanhaven Hearts	Aberdeen Lads Club	N/A
2002–03	Sunnybank	Culter	Deveronside	Turriff United	N/A
2003–04	Culter	Sunnybank	Cruden Bay; Aberdeen Lads Club	Maud; Ellon United	N/A
2004–05	Culter (2)	Glentanar	East End; Maud	Parkvale; Fraserburgh United	N/A
2005–06	Culter (3)	Formartine United	Fraserburgh United; FC Stoneywood	Dyce; Islavale	N/A
2006–07	Culter (4)	Sunnybank	Islavale; Glentanar	East End; Maud	3rd Round 2007–08
2007–08	Banks o' Dee	Sunnybank	Formartine United; Parkvale	Banchory St Ternan; Lewis United	2nd Round 2008–09
2008–09	Banks o' Dee (2)	Sunnybank	Hillhead; Stonehaven	Buchanhaven Hearts; FC Stoneywood	2nd Round 2009–10
2009–10	Sunnybank (2)	Culter	East End; Buchanhaven Hearts	Fraserburgh United; Stonehaven	3rd Round 2010–11
2010–11	Culter (5)	Hall Russell United	Fraserburgh United	Forres Thistle	3rd Round 2011–12
2011–12	Hermes	Stonehaven	Forres Thistle; Sunnybank	Fraserburgh United; Deveronside	1st Round 2012–13
2012–13	Culter (6)	Dyce	Lewis United; Fraserburgh United	New Elgin; East End	3rd Round 2013–14
2013–14	Culter (7)	Banks o' Dee	East End; Longside	Inverness City; Cruden Bay	2nd Round 2014–15
2014–15	Hermes (2)	Maud	New Elgin; Cruden Bay	Bridge of Don Thistle; Dufftown	2nd Preliminary round 2015–16
2015–16	Banks o' Dee (3)	Hermes	Ellon United; FC Stoneywood	Buckie Rovers; Colony Park	2nd Round 2016–17
2016–17	Banks o' Dee (4)	Dyce	Buckie Rovers; Deveronside	Ellon United; Montrose Roselea	3rd Round 2017–18
2017–18	Banks o' Dee (5)	Hermes	Banchory St Ternan; Inverness City	East End; Nairn St Ninian	1st Preliminary round 2018–19
2018–19	Banks o' Dee (6)	Bridge of Don Thistle	Dufftown; Stonehaven	Banchory St Ternan; Deveronside	2nd Round 2019–20
2019–20	Season declared Null and void on 2 May 2020 after vote among SJFA North clubs, no champion was declared and no relegation applied. (Note: Using a 'points per game' algorithm applied in other leagues, Banks o' Dee (who were leading the table by a big margin) would have been nominal champions.)				N/A
2020–21	Season declared Null and void by SJFA on 16 Mar 2021, no champion was declared and no relegation applied.				N/A
2021–22	Banks o' Dee (7)	Bridge of Don Thistle	Deveronside	Stonehaven; Stoneywood Parkvale; Dufftown	1st Round 2022–23
2022–23	Culter (8)	Hermes	Dufftown; Banchory St Ternan	Sunnybank; Fraserburgh United; Rothie Rovers; Buchanhaven Hearts; Newmachar United	1st Round 2023–24
2023–24	Culter (9)	Bridge of Don Thistle	Stoneywood Parkvale; Nairn St Ninian	Islavale; Banks o' Dee Juniors	2nd Preliminary round 2024–25
2024–25	Culter (10)	Hermes	Newmachar United; Fraserburgh United	Lossiemouth United; Longside	1st Preliminary round 2025–26
