= 2021–22 Highland Football League =

Breedon Highland League
- Season: 2021–22
- Dates: 24 July 2021 – 23 April 2022
- Champions: Fraserburgh
- Relegated: Fort William
- Matches: 306
- Goals: 1,223 (4 per match)
- Biggest home win: Fraserburgh 12–0 Fort William (11 December 2021)
- Biggest away win: Fort William 0–8 Brora Rangers (21 August 2021); Forres Mechanics 0–8 Brora Rangers (9 March 2022)
- Highest scoring: Fort William 3–10 Inverurie Loco Works (11 September 2021)
- Longest winning run: 23 matches: Buckie Thistle
- Longest unbeaten run: 25 matches: Buckie Thistle
- Longest winless run: 31 matches: Fort William
- Longest losing run: 10 matches: Fort William & Turriff United

The 2021–22 Highland Football League (known as the Breedon Highland League for sponsorship reasons) was the 119th season of the Highland Football League, and the 8th season as part of the fifth tier of the Scottish football pyramid system. Brora Rangers were the reigning champions.

The title was decided during the final round of fixtures with Fraserburgh taking their first league title in twenty seasons thanks to a 5–0 victory over Forres Mechanics. They won the title by three points ahead of Buckie Thistle, who recorded a run of 23 consecutive victories during the campaign, a Highland League record.

Fraserburgh played the winners of the 2021–22 Lowland Football League (Bonnyrigg Rose Athletic) in the Pyramid play-off, losing 3–2 on aggregate.

== Teams ==
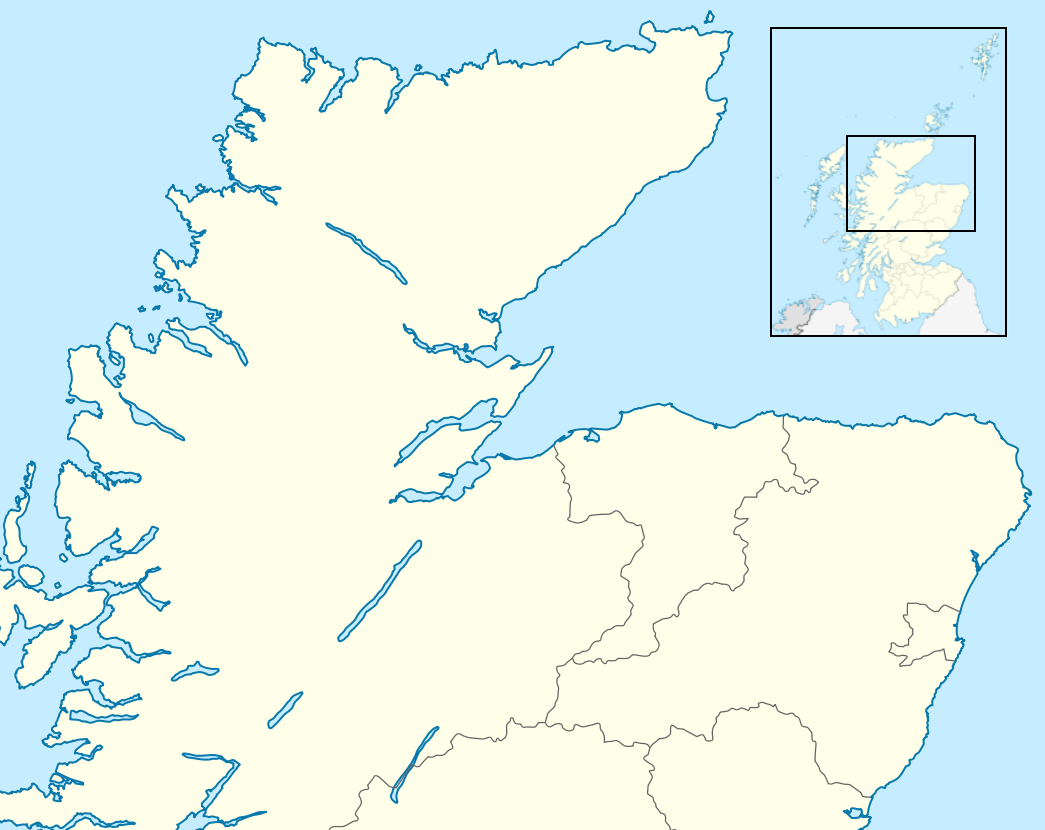
Location of teams in 2021–22 Highland Football League

Brechin City became the first club to join the league via relegation from the SPFL, having lost the League Two play-offs against Kelty Hearts. Forres Mechanics, who were withdrawn from the previous season, returned the league.

=== To Highland League ===
Relegated from League Two

- Brechin City

=== Stadia and locations ===
All grounds are equipped with floodlights as required by league regulations.

Team	Location	Stadium	Capacity	Seats
Brechin City	Brechin	Glebe Park	4,083	1,519
Brora Rangers	Brora	Dudgeon Park	4,000	200
Buckie Thistle	Buckie	Victoria Park	5,000	400
Clachnacuddin	Inverness	Grant Street Park	2,074	154
Deveronvale	Banff	Princess Royal Park	2,600	360
Formartine United	Pitmedden	North Lodge Park	2,500	300
Forres Mechanics	Forres	Mosset Park	2,700	502
Fort William	Fort William	Claggan Park (Note: Fort William played all of their league games during the 2021–22 season away from Claggan Park, due to an unplayable pitch.)	4,000	400
Fraserburgh	Fraserburgh	Bellslea Park	3,000	480
Huntly	Huntly	Christie Park	2,200	270
Inverurie Loco Works	Inverurie	Harlaw Park	2,500	250
Keith	Keith	Kynoch Park	4,000	370
Lossiemouth	Lossiemouth	Grant Park	2,050	250
Nairn County	Nairn	Station Park	2,250	250
Rothes	Rothes	Mackessack Park	2,700	184
Strathspey Thistle	Grantown-on-Spey	Seafield Park	1,600	150
Turriff United	Turriff	The Haughs	2,135	135
Wick Academy	Wick	Harmsworth Park	2,412	102

== League table ==
Pos	Team	Pld	W	D	L	GF	GA	GD	Pts	Qualification or relegation
1	Fraserburgh (C)	34	30	2	2	135	24	+111	92	Qualification for the Pyramid play-off
2	Buckie Thistle	34	29	2	3	127	21	+106	89	
3	Brechin City	34	28	1	5	102	27	+75	85	
4	Brora Rangers	34	25	2	7	117	36	+81	77	
5	Rothes	34	21	6	7	75	31	+44	69	
6	Formartine United	34	21	6	7	80	46	+34	69	
7	Inverurie Loco Works	34	19	6	9	77	47	+30	63	
8	Nairn County	34	11	6	17	61	70	−9	39	
9	Wick Academy	34	10	9	15	55	85	−30	39	
10	Huntly	34	10	7	17	53	67	−14	37	
11	Clachnacuddin	34	10	7	17	51	80	−29	37	
12	Forres Mechanics	34	8	10	16	45	80	−35	34	
13	Keith	34	10	4	20	36	88	−52	34	
14	Deveronvale	34	9	5	20	55	94	−39	32	
15	Lossiemouth	34	8	6	20	32	83	−51	30	
16	Strathspey Thistle	34	5	5	24	47	114	−67	20	
17	Turriff United	34	4	6	24	41	96	−55	18	
18	Fort William (R)	34	1	4	29	34	134	−100	7	Qualification for the Highland League play-off

Rules for classification: 1) Points; 2) Goal difference; 3) Number of goals scored
(C) Champions; (R) Relegated

== Results ==
Home \ Away	BRE	BRO	BUC	CLA	DEV	FOU	FOM	FOW	FRA	HUN	INV	KEI	LOS	NAI	ROT	STR	TUR	WIC
Brechin City		2–1	3–2	4–0	4–0	4–1	4–1	4–0	3–5	1–0	1–0	4–0	5–0	5–0	2–2	7–3	3–1	5–1
Brora Rangers	0–2		2–0	6–0	4–0	0–3	4–0	3–0	0–2	4–0	2–1	1–0	7–0	4–0	3–0	8–1	4–0	2–2
Buckie Thistle	1–0	5–0		4–1	5–0	4–0	3–1	9–1	2–2	3–0	3–0	10–0	5–0	4–1	2–1	5–0	2–0	1–1
Clachnacuddin	0–1	0–4	1–3		2–3	0–1	3–3	4–3	1–2	2–5	0–0	0–1	1–1	2–1	0–2	4–1	3–2	2–3
Deveronvale	1–4	0–3	0–4	0–1		0–4	1–1	10–0	0–6	3–3	3–2	2–0	6–0	4–5	0–3	3–0	0–6	3–4
Formartine United	1–0	4–4	1–5	4–2	4–1		4–1	3–0	0–2	5–1	1–3	4–0	5–2	4–1	1–1	4–0	5–0	3–2
Forres Mechanics	0–1	0–8	0–2	2–2	2–2	0–1		4–0	0–7	3–1	1–0	0–0	1–0	2–3	0–7	4–2	1–1	1–1
Fort William	1–5	0–8	1–4	1–2	1–2	1–1	2–3		0–4	1–1	3–10	1–2	0–2	0–4	0–1	4–2	1–1	1–3
Fraserburgh	1–0	6–2	1–3	7–0	5–0	3–0	5–0	12–0		4–0	3–0	7–0	6–1	1–0	1–2	7–0	1–1	5–0
Huntly	0–3	1–2	0–2	2–2	4–1	0–1	2–5	3–0	1–2		1–1	1–1	2–1	1–3	0–2	1–1	3–0	3–4
Inverurie Loco Works	2–1	2–1	1–5	5–0	3–0	3–1	2–2	2–0	0–2	2–1		5–3	5–2	3–2	1–1	5–1	2–1	4–0
Keith	0–6	1–7	0–6	0–3	2–4	1–2	1–2	3–1	0–5	0–0	0–0		1–0	0–2	0–5	5–1	3–0	2–0
Lossiemouth	0–3	0–2	0–5	0–2	2–1	2–2	0–0	3–1	1–3	1–4	2–2	2–0		1–1	0–1	1–1	2–1	2–1
Nairn County	1–3	0–3	1–4	1–1	0–2	0–1	2–2	3–3	2–3	1–2	0–1	1–3	0–1		3–2	4–0	5–3	2–2
Rothes	0–1	1–2	2–0	4–1	3–0	0–0	1–0	3–0	1–3	3–0	3–1 (Note: Match played at Grant Park, Lossiemouth.)	2–0	4–0	2–2		2–3	4–1	1–1
Strathspey Thistle	1–3	1–5	0–6	2–4	1–1	0–3	3–1	7–3	2–4	1–2	0–1	0–2	3–1	1–2	1–4		2–1	3–3
Turriff United	0–5	1–7	0–4	0–3	4–0	2–2	3–2	3–2	0–3	0–4	1–2	1–3	0–2	0–6	1–3	3–3		2–3
Wick Academy	1–3	1–4	0–4	2–2	2–2	1–4	2–0	3–2	2–5	2–4	0–6	3–2	2–0	0–2	1–2	1–0	1–1	

Legend: Blue = home team win; Yellow = draw; Red = away team win.

== Highland League play-off ==
Play-offs for the final place in the 2022–23 Highland League were planned however no matches took place. As the winners of the 2021–22 Midlands Football League (Carnoustie Panmure) and the 2021–22 North Caledonian Football League (Invergordon) were ineligible for promotion, 2021–22 North Superleague winners Banks O' Dee were put forward to play-off with Fort William, who finished bottom of the Highland Football League. The day before the scheduled first leg, Fort William withdrew due to player eligibility rules. As a result, Banks O' Dee were promoted and Fort William were relegated.

=== First leg ===
23 April 2022
15:00

Banks O' Dee	w/o	Fort William

Spain Park, Aberdeen

=== Second leg ===
30 April 2022
15:00

Fort William	w/o	Banks O' Dee

Claggan Park, Fort William
