= 1998–99 Scottish Junior Cup =

Tournament details
- Country: Scotland

Final positions
- Champions: Kilwinning Rangers
- Runners-up: Kelty Hearts

The 1998–99 Scottish Junior Cup was the 113th staging of the Scottish Junior Cup, a competition for clubs affiliated to the Scottish Junior Football Association (where "junior" in the title refers to the level of football, not the age of the players). It was won by Kilwinning Rangers, who defeated Kelty Hearts 1–0 in the final.

== First round ==
These ties were scheduled to take place on Saturday, TBC.

Home team	Score	Away team

== Second round ==
These ties were scheduled to take place on Saturday, TBC.

Home team	Score	Away team

== Third round ==
These ties were scheduled to take place on Saturday, TBC

Home team	Score	Away team

== Fourth round ==
These ties were scheduled to take place on Saturday, TBC.

Home team	Score	Away team

== Fifth round ==
These ties were scheduled to take place on Saturday, TBC.

Home team	Score	Away team
Auchinleck Talbot	2 – 0	Hill o' Beath Hawthorn
Beith	0 – 1	Larkhall Thistle
Camelon	2 – 2	Arthurlie
Replay	0 – 2	
Fauldhouse United	1 – 2	Kelty Hearts
Glenafton Athletic	0 – 1	Petershill
Kilwinning Rangers	3 – 0	FC Stoneywood
Maryhill	2 – 0	Bathgate Thistle
Montrose Roselea	2 – 2	Forfar West End
replay	2 – 1	

== Quarter finals ==
These ties were played on Saturday, TBC.

Home team	Score	Away team
Kelty Hearts	7 – 1	Montrose Roselea
Kilwinning Rangers	1 – 1	Auchinleck Talbot
Replay	1 – 0	
Larkhall Thistle	1 – 3	Arthurlie
Maryhill	0 – 1	Petershill

== Semi-finals ==
These ties were played on Saturday, TBC.

Home team	Score	Away team	Venue
Kelty Hearts	3 – 1	Petershill	
Kilwinning Rangers	1 – 0	Arthurlie	

== Final ==
The final took place on Sunday, 30 May 1999 at Firhill Stadium, home of Partick Thistle.

Kilwinning Rangers won 1–0 with a goal from Gerry Peline only 80 seconds after the kick-off. A number of Scottish MPs tabled an Early Day Motion in Parliament congratulating Kilwinning on winning the Junior Cup and several other trophies during the season.

Home team	Score	Away team	Venue
Kilwinning Rangers	1 – 0	Kelty Hearts	Firhill Stadium
