= Allan Youngson =

Scottish footballer

Personal information
- Date of birth: 29 September 1984 (age 42)
- Place of birth: Aberdeen, Scotland
- Position: Midfielder

Youth career
- 2002–2003: Chelsea

Senior career*
Years	Team	Apps	(Gls)
2003–2004	Dundee	1	(0)
2004–2007	Peterhead	71	(3)
2007–2010	Inverurie Loco Works		
2010–2017	Culter		
2017–2018	Dyce Juniors		
Total		72	(3)

Managerial career
- 2018–: Dyce Juniors
- * Club domestic league appearances and goals as of 11:17, 15 December 2018 (UTC)

Allan Youngson (born 29 September 1984), is a former professional footballer who has played in the Scottish Premier League for Dundee. He is currently the co-manager of Dyce Juniors in the Scottish Junior Football Association, North Region.

== Career ==
Youngson joined Dundee after a time in the youth system at Chelsea, and made his debut for the club in the Scottish Premier League against Hibernian in May 2004. A spell in the Scottish Football League with Peterhead was followed by stints in the Highland Football League and North Superleague with Inverurie Loco Works and Culter respectively.

Youngson ended his playing career with a short spell at Dyce Juniors and he rejoined the club as co-manager with Ritchie Clark in December 2018.
