= Montrose Roselea F.C. =

Association football club in Angus, Scotland

Montrose Roselea
- Full name: Montrose Roselea Junior Football Club
- Nickname: The Lea
- Founded: 13 September 1930; 96 years ago
- Ground: Links Park; Montrose
- Capacity: 4,936
- Coordinates: 56°42′50″N 2°27′32″W
- Chairman: Graham Douglas
- Manager: Sean Whitworth-Pert
- League: Midlands First Division
- 2025–26: Midlands First Division, 4th of 10
Home colours	Away colours

Montrose Roselea Junior Football Club is a Scottish Junior football club based in the town of Montrose, Angus. It is a member of the Scottish Junior Football Association and currently plays in the North Region Junior Football League Premier Division in the sixth tier of football in Scotland. It will join the Midlands Football League starting from the 2023–24 season.

== Club history ==
The club played its first match at the juvenile level on 18 October 1913 on the Links against Montrose Harp, which ended in a 3–3 draw thanks to a hat-trick by Roselea's captain, Dickson. In 1921–22, Roselea continued playing at the juvenile (under-21) level in the Montrose Juvenile League in the 1920s. At this level the club was very successful, winning numerous local juvenile leagues and cups.

Club officials announced that they planned switch to junior football on 13 September 1930 during a fundraising ceremony at the Drill Hall in Arbroath presided over by Sir Robert Hutchison. In 1936, the club finally began playing junior football in the Montrose & Kincardineshire Junior League, winning the league in their first two seasons. Gordon Smith, future Scotland, Hibs, Hearts, and Dundee star, played twice for the Lea in May 1939 when he was just aged 15, scoring a hat-trick in his trial match against Blairgowrie United. In their early years, crowds of around 2,000 were typical at Links Park for Roselea matches.

They were then members of the Angus League and Tayside Region League, before competing in the new SJFA East Region which they, along with all other Tayside junior clubs became a part in 2002.

Playing second fiddle to the senior Montrose, success has been sparse during their years of existence however in recent years the success has been beyond a club of its size.

Roselea's best performance in the Scottish Junior Cup was in 1998–99. In the fifth round the Lea beat fellow Angus side, Forfar West End, in a replay at Strathmore Park to secure a place in the quarter-finals for the first time in their history. They were then defeated 7–1 away to eventual runners-up Kelty Hearts in the quarter-final tie. Their best cup-run since then was in 2008–09, when the club reached the fifth round where they drew 0–0 with Petershill at home before losing the replay 2–1 at 'The Peasy'.

Roselea traditionally played their home games at Broomfield Park, a relatively undeveloped facility in the north of the town which has room for around 1,800 spectators.

The club applied to move from the SJFA East Region to join the North Region, and this was accepted for the beginning of season 2016–17. The Lea secured promotion to the North Superleague in their first season in the SJFA North Region after finishing as North Division One (West) runners-up and then winning their Superleague play-off tie against 5–0 against Buckie Rovers at Colony Park.

For the 2018–19 season, Roselea reached an agreement to share Montrose's Links Park stadium, with a view towards a longer-term arrangement. Broomfield Park is still used on occasions where there are schedule conflicts at Links Park.

Historically the club played in a green home strip but since the 2019–20 season they have played in the royal blue colours of the senior Montrose side. Green is now worn as the clubs away colours.

In November 2022, the Roselea committee announced a planned move back to the SJFA East Region due to an increase in travel expenses incurred since joining the North Region. The club hope to compete in the now predominantly Tayside-based Midlands Football League (also in the Scottish sixth tier) from the 2023–24 season onwards. On 20 February 2023, Roselea announced that their move to the Midlands League from the 2023–24 season onwards was confirmed.

== Honours ==
=== Junior ===
==== League ====
East Region North Division

- Winners: 2008–09
- Runners-up: 2005–06

North Region Division 1 West

- Runners-up: 2016–17

Tayside Region League Division 1

- Winners: 2001–02
- Runners-up: 1993–94, 1998–99

Montrose & Kincardineshire Junior League

- Winners (2): 1936–37, 1937–38

Angus Junior League

- Winners: 1947–48, 1949–50
- Runners-up: 1950–51

==== Cups ====
- DJ Laing Homes League Cup: 2002–03, 2003–04, 2009–10
- North & Tayside Inter-Regional Cup: 2007–08
- Division One Rosebank Car Centre Cup: 1998–99
- Intersport Cup: 1996–97
- Division One (Downfield SC Cup): 1993–94
- Arbroath & District Cup: 1962–63
- Barrie Cup: 1957–58
- Express Cup: 1936–37
- Kinnabar Cup: 1937–38
- Brechin Rosebowl: 1932–33, 1937–38, 1938–39

=== Juvenile ===
- Montrose Juvenile League: 1930–31
- Brechin and District League: 1932–33
- Robertson Cup: 1923–24
- Canale Cup: 1930–31
- Montrose Juvenile Cup: 1930–31
- Forfar and District Juvenile Cup: 1932–33
- Mathers Cup: 1931–32

== Club records ==
Biggest win: 16–0 v Fochabers, 14 Jan 2017, ND1 West – (Reoch 8', 45'; Bailey 11', 22'; Hester 14', 29', 32', 59', 75', 81', 86'; McLeod 62', 70', 73', 87', 89')

Biggest defeat: 11–1 v Kirriemuir Thistle, 29 Sept 1956, Angus Junior League

Most goals: 304, Steve Aitken (1984–2004)

Most appearances: 700, Paul Whyte (1997–2016)

Largest home attendance:

- Links Park: 4,000 v Banks O' Dee, 5 May 1947, Friendly.
- Broomfield Park: 750 v Forfar West End, 13 February 1999, Scottish Junior Cup 5th Round

== Notable players ==
- (Scotland) Gordon Smith
- (Scotland) Ernie Copland
- (Scotland) Willie Robertson

== Notes ==
1.League was named Division Two from 1969–1999
