= Inverness City F.C. =

Association football club in Scotland

Inverness City
- Full name: Inverness City Football Club
- Nickname: City
- Founded: 2006
- Dissolved: 2019
- Ground: Lister Park; Bught Park, Inverness
- Capacity: 1000
- Chairman: Alastair Wardhaugh
- Manager: Kevin McLeod
- League: None
- 2017–18: , 14th of 14 (relegated)
Home colours	Away colours

Inverness City Football Club was a Scottish football club from Inverness. Their home strip was white and black with their change strip being red.

The club, founded in 2006, was not the first time the name Inverness City had been used in the Highland Capital. Local Senior Club, Inverness Caledonian Thistle, at the time playing in Scottish Division One, had a ballot in January 2001 on whether to change the team name to "Inverness City F.C.", marking the recently attained City Status. The name change was overwhelmingly rejected by the fans at 412 for the change while 1,067 fans rejected the name change following a ballot at their Scottish Cup tie with Ayr United. Caley Thistle initially registered the name as a backup in case of a change of heart, however no such change happened, and as such Inverness City took the name for their new club.

The club entered the North Caledonian Football League in the 2006–07 season and originally played their games at Ferry Brae Park in North Kessock and won their first trophy when they beat Golspie Sutherland in the Jock Mackay Memorial Cup. They also won the Football Times Cup when again they triumphed over Golspie 3–2. In Season 2007–08 they again reached the Jock Mackay Memorial Cup Final but were beaten this time on penalties by Golspie Sutherland.

For Season 2008–09 Inverness City successfully applied to the Scottish Junior Football Association for membership and started life as a Junior team in the North Region Division 2. They finally moved into Inverness where their home games were played at the Northern Meeting Park. They were also eligible to play in the Scottish Junior Cup. The Meeting Park venue was the cause of some controversy due to its use by a cricket side during the summer months.

In their inaugural season, Inverness City won the Scotscoup Division 2 Junior League and the Elginshire Cup where they defeated Bishopmill United 3–0 in the final to complete an historic double.

For three seasons, City had qualified for promotion to the North Superleague but were denied entry, owing to the club not having access to the Northern Meeting Park for the full duration of the playing season. The club eventually managed to secure a playing facility at the Bught Park in Inverness that was compliant with 'Superleague' criteria – thus enabling the club to obtain promotion.

After being relegated from the Superleague at the end of the 2017–18 season, Inverness City announced they were taking a year out of Junior football. They had hoped to move to a new ground on the outskirts of the city, but the facility was unlikely to be ready for the start of the season and the club felt that playing out of another ground outwith Inverness would not be cost-effective and that they would struggle to attract players. The club remained as non-playing members of the Association and hoped to return in season 2019/20. However, despite these hopes, the club were forced to fold due to lack of ground in 2019.

== Honours ==
- PMAC Group Division 1
  - Winners: 2010–11, 2011–12, 2013–14
  - Runners Up: 2009–10
- Scotscoup Division 2
  - Champions: 2008–09
- North Regional Cup
  - Runners Up: 2011–12
- Grill Cup
  - Runners Up: 2010–11, 2011–12
- Morrison Cup
  - Runners Up: 2009–10
- Elginshire Cup
  - Winners: 2008–09
- Jock Mackay Memorial Cup
  - Winners: 2006–07
  - Runners Up: 2007–08
- Football Times Cup
  - Winners: 2006–07

== Records ==
=== Scottish Junior Cup ===
- Best performance:
  - Third Round 2012–13

=== League records ===
- Biggest home victory:
  - Inverness City 10–0 New Elgin, Saturday 9 October 2010
- Biggest away victory:
  - RAF Lossiemouth 2–8 Inverness City, Saturday 8 November 2008
  - Bishopmill United 0–6 Inverness City, Saturday 14 November 2009
- Biggest home defeat:
  - Inverness City 1–4 Nairn St. Ninian, Saturday 15 November 2008
- Biggest away defeat:
  - Whitehills 5–2 Inverness City, Saturday 6 September 2008
  - Deveronside 5–2 Inverness City, Saturday 18 October 2008
  - Glentanar 4–1 Inverness City, Saturday 5 September 2009
