= Rothie Rovers F.C. =

Association football club in Aberdeenshire

Rothie Rovers
- Full name: Rothie Rovers Football Club
- Nickname: Rovers
- Founded: 1983
- Ground: Forgue Road; Rothienorman
- Coordinates: 57°24′32″N 2°27′52″W
- League: NoSFL Premier League
- 2025–26: NoSFL Premier League, 5th of 16
Home colours

Rothie Rovers are a Scottish football club from the village of Rothienorman in Aberdeenshire. They are members of the North Region of the Scottish Junior Football Association and currently play in the North of Scotland Football League.

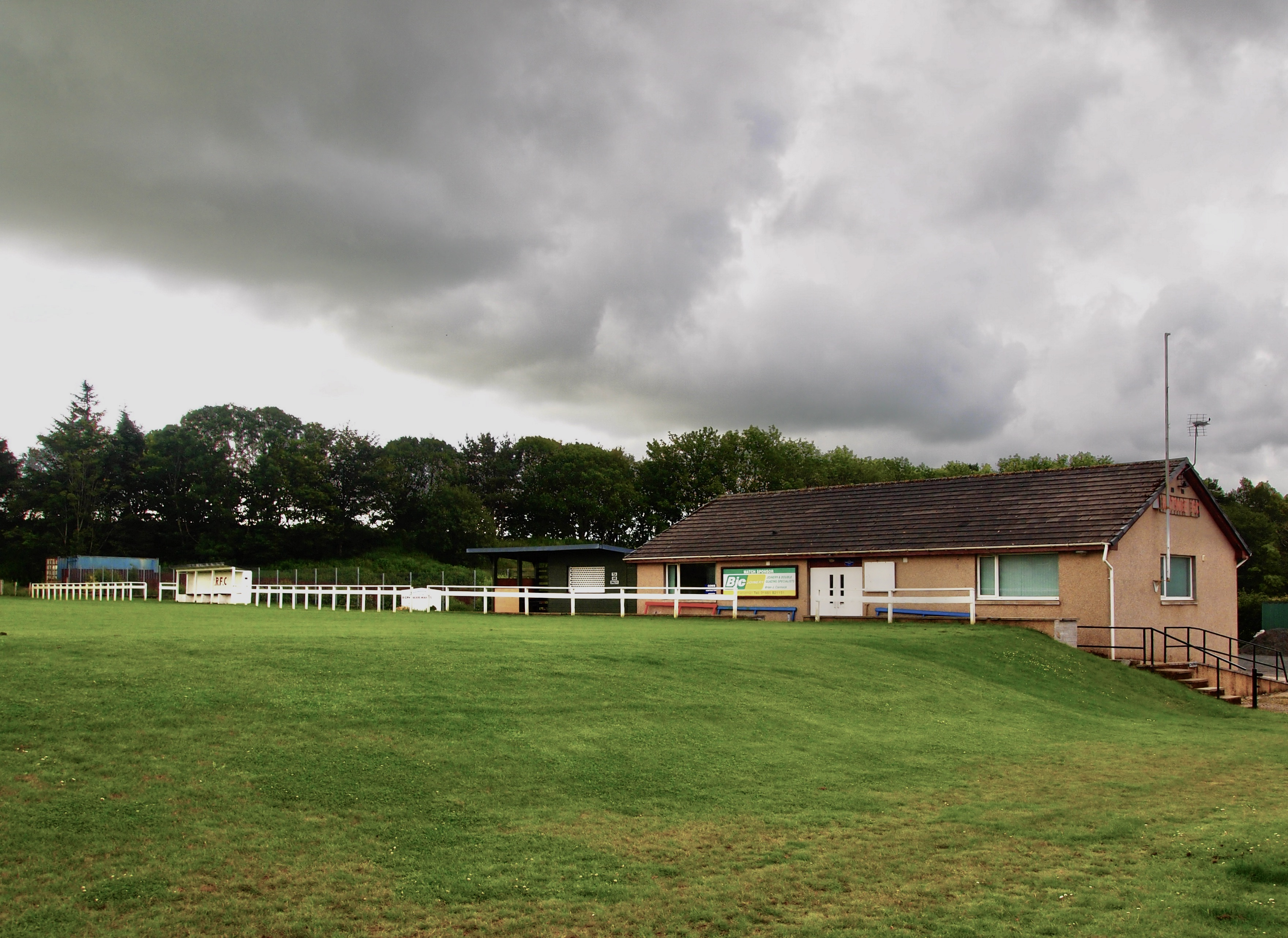
Rothie Rovers F.C., Forgue Road, Rothienorman

== History ==
Rothie were formed in 1983 as an amateur club, playing in the Aberdeenshire Amateur Football Association. They joined the Scottish Junior Football Association in 2020, although their first season was interrupted by the coronavirus pandemic. Their home ground is the public park on Forgue Road in the village.
