= Links Park =

Football stadium in Montrose, Scotland

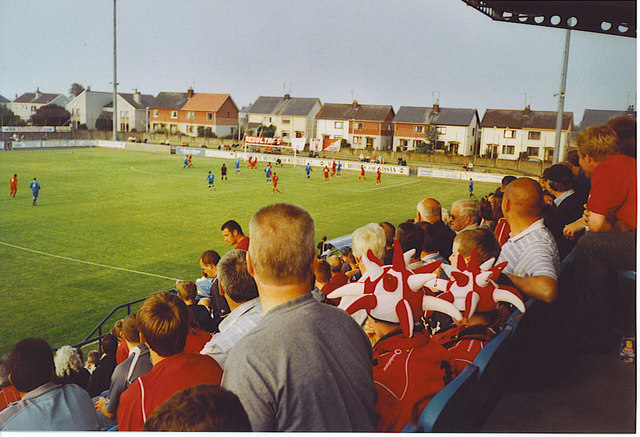
- Montrose playing Aberdeen at Links Park in 2006

- Location in Angus
- Location: Montrose, Scotland
- Coordinates: 56°42′50″N 2°27′32″W
- Owner: Bryan Keith
- Capacity: 4,936
- Surface: Artificial turf

Construction
- Opened: 1887

Tenants
- Montrose F.C. (1887–present); Montrose W.F.C. (2017–present); Montrose Roselea F.C. (2018–present)

Links Park is a football stadium in Montrose, Scotland. It has been the home ground of Montrose F.C. since 1887.

Links Park was opened in 1887 on land rented from the 'Auld Kirk'. To help finance the new ground, Montrose F.C. rented the pitch out for circuses and livestock grazing. The club was eventually able to raise £150 in 1920 to buy a stand, that had been previously used by the Highland Games. A roof was built over the Wellington Street end of the ground in the 1960s. Floodlights were installed in 1971 and first used in a match against Stranraer. The record attendance at the ground was 8,983, for a Scottish Cup quarter-final tie against Dundee in March 1973.

Links Park was significantly improved in the 1990s, after the club was taken over by Bryan Keith. The wooden Main Stand was replaced by a cantilevered stand, seating 1,258 people. Other improvements brought the total investment to nearly £1 million, of which the Football Trust provided £400,000. Keith bought the ground in 1995 for £500,000 and granted the club a 25-year lease, without rent. GlaxoSmithKline provided a £250,000 grant in 2006 for the club to install an all-weather surface at Links Park. This pitch was replaced by another artificial surface during the 2015 close season.

The current stadium capacity is 4,936. The all-seated Main Stand (South) has a capacity of 1,338 with the West Stand terrace holding a maximum of 1,582 spectators. There is also uncovered standing areas on the North and East sides off the ground. The pitch at the stadium measures 113 x 70 yards.

For the 2018–19 season onwards, local junior football club Montrose Roselea have shared the ground.
