= Buckie Rovers F.C. =

Association football club in Moray, Scotland

Buckie Rovers
- Full name: Buckie Rovers Football Club
- Nickname: The Rovers
- Founded: 1889
- Ground: Merson Park, Barrhill Road, Buckie
- Coordinates: 57°40′20″N 2°59′3″W
- Chairman: Francis Simpson
- Manager: Darren Thain
- League: North Of Scotland Football League Championship
Home colours	Away colours

Buckie Rovers Football Club are a Scottish football club from the town of Buckie, Moray. After a period abeyance during the 2021–22 season due to organisational difficulties caused by the COVID-19 pandemic in Scotland, the club folded in September 2022. In July 2023 the club restarted and are entered into the Moray & District Welfare League with a view to returning to the Junior setup in a couple years time after a rebuilding period. The Club have won a historic Treble in their first season back in football in 2024 after roughly 4 years in abeyance.

Rovers withdrew from the league early in season 2004–05 but rejoined the following year. The club used to share a ground with their larger Highland League neighbours Buckie Thistle but are now based at Merson Park in the Buckpool area of the town. The club colours are black and white.

Rovers earned promotion to the North Superleague for the first time after clinching the 2015–16 North Region Division One (West) championship in March 2016.

== Honours ==
- Moray Community Cup Winners: 2024–25
- WJ Tewnion Memorial Trophy Winners: 2024
- Mike Simpson Memorial Trophy Winners: 2024
- Moray & District Welfare FA Abbeyside Premier League winners: 2024
- North Region Division One (West) winners: 2015–16
- North Region (North) League winners: 1969–70, 1974–75, 1982–83, 1992–93
- Morayshire Junior League winners: 1962–63, 1964–65, 1965–66, 1967–68
- North Region Division Two (Gordon Williamson) Trophy: 1961–62, 1963–64, 1964–65, 1975–76, 1980–81
- Morayshire Junior Cup: 1946–47, 1966–67, 1967–68, 1981–82, 1996–97
- Matthew Cup: 1962–63, 1963–64, 1964–65, 1966–67, 1967–68, 1969–70, 1975–76, 1977–78, 1993–94, 1998–99
- Nicholson Cup: 1961–62, 1962–63, 1963–64, 1964–65, 1965–66, 1966–67, 1975–76, 1981–82, 1985–86
- Robertson Cup: 1962–63, 1965–66, 1983–84, 1995–96
- Stewart Memorial Cup: 1964–65, 1965–66, 1967–68, 1972–73, 1981–82
- North of Scotland (Morayshire) Cup: 1961–62, 1967–68, 1969–70, 1977–78
- Connon Cup: 1981–82
- White Horse Cup: 1947–48, 1961–62, 1966–67, 1969–70, 1975–76
