= Dufftown F.C. =

Association football club in Moray, Scotland

Dufftown
- Full name: Dufftown Football Club
- Nickname: The Toonsers
- Founded: 1890
- Ground: Westburn Park; Hill Street; Dufftown
- Coordinates: 57°26′52″N 3°8′5″W
- President: Harry Officer
- Manager: James Reid
- League: NoSFL Championship
- 2025–26: NoSFL Championship, 13th of 15
Home colours

Dufftown Football Club are a Scottish football club from the town of Dufftown, Moray. Members of the Scottish Junior Football Association since 2001, they compete in the North of Scotland Football League. They club are based at Westburn Park and their colours are all green.

It was announced in July 2012 that the club would take a year out of the game.

The club returned in season 2013–14, playing in the PMAC Group First Division West. The management team was Steven Rattray and Fraser Bremner. Rattray left the club in May 2014 after helping Dufftown secure a top three finish in the league following their season in abeyance. Bremner left for Highland League club Rothes in late 2015 after guiding Dufftown to the Elginshire Cup Final and promotion to the North Region Superleague. Bremner was replaced by Steve Paterson at the start of 2016 with Michael Morrison replacing him after Dufftown had secured their Superleague status by defeating Sunnybank 3–2 in a play off match at the end of season 2016–17.

At the end of the 2021–22 season, Dufftown were promoted from that season's North First Division after Hall Russell United went into abeyance.

== Notable players ==
Famous former Dufftown players include Michael Fraser and Nicky Walker.
