= East End F.C. =

Association football club in Scotland

East End
- Full name: East End Football Club
- Nickname: The End
- Founded: 1887
- Ground: New Advocates Park; Aberdeen
- Coordinates: 57°9′50″N 2°5′25″W
- Manager: Aaron McGuigan
- League: NoSFL Premier League
- 2025–26: NoSFL Premier League, 12th of 16
- Website: http://www.eastendjuniors.co.uk
Home colours	Away colours

East End Football Club are a Scottish football club from the city of Aberdeen. Members of the Scottish Junior Football Association, they currently play in the North of Scotland Football League. The club is based at New Advocates Park, 500 metres from Pittodrie Stadium, home of Aberdeen. Their home kit colours are black and gold.

The team have been managed since November 2018 by Stuart Whicher.

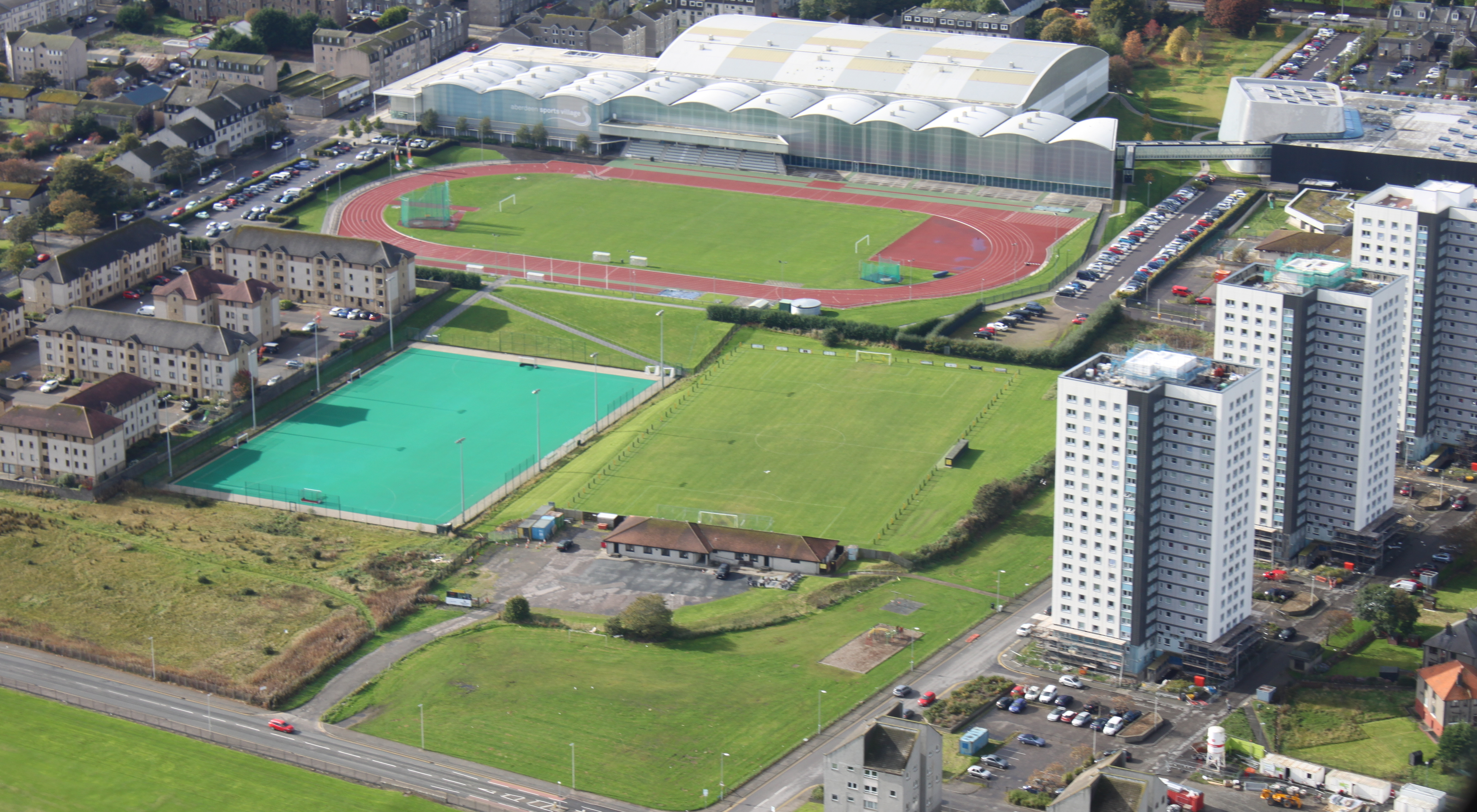
Aerial view of the stadium (right foreground)

== Honours ==
- North East Premier Division winners: 1977–78
- North Regional Cup (North Champions): 1977–78
- Aberdeen & District Junior League winners: 1926–27, 1933–34
- North Division One winners: 2006–07
- North East First Division winners: 1984–85, 1986–87, 1992–93
- Archibald Cup: 1927–28, 1929–30, 1933–34, 1976–77, 1977–78, 1978–79, 1993–94, 2016–17
- McLeman Cup: 1926–27, 1929–30, 1954–55, 1965–66
- Duthie (Acorn Heating) Cup: 1904–05, 1906–07, 1922–23, 1927–28, 1929–30, 1931–32, 1966–67
- North East League Cup: 1989–90
- Aberdeen & District Junior League Cup: 1925–26
- Morrison Trophy: 1974–75, 1998–99, 2006–07, 2012–13, 2016–17
- Aberdeen County Trophy: 1904–05, 1906–07, 1925–26, 1962–63
- Jimmy Gibb Memorial Trophy: 1986–87, 1992–93
- Martin & Johnson Trophy: 1974–75
- North Regional Cup: 2016–17, 2017–18, 2021–22
