= Nairn St Ninian F.C. =

Association football club in Highland, Scotland

Nairn St. Ninian
- Full name: Nairn Saint Ninian JFC
- Nickname: Saints
- Founded: 1968
- Ground: Showfield Park; Lodgehill Road; Nairn
- Capacity: 1000
- Coordinates: 57°34′55″N 3°52′33″W
- Chairman: Derek Davidson
- Manager: Stuart Finnie
- League: NoSFL Championship
- 2025–26: NoSFL Championship, 7th of 15
Home colours	Away colours

Nairn St. Ninian JFC are a Scottish football club based in Nairn, Highland. Members of the Scottish Junior Football Association, they currently play in the North of Scotland Football League. Formed in 1968, the club are based at Showfield Park Nairn and their home colours are maroon and sky blue. Their away colours are black and white

== Honours ==
- North Region Division 1 (West):
  - Winners: 2017–18
  - Runner Up: 2001–02
- North Division 2:
  - Runner Up: 2006–07
- North Regional (North) League:
  - Winners (4): 1975–76, 1977–78, 1978–79, 1981–82
- North East Division 1 West:
  - Runner Up: 1997–98
- North Region Second Division (Gordon Williamson) Trophy: 1969–70, 1982–83, 1991–92, 1999–00
- Gordon Williamson Cup: 2006–07
- Morayshire Junior Cup: 1968–69, 1979–80, 1997–98
- Matthew Cup: 1997–98
- Nicholson Cup: 1979–80, 1980–81, 1982–83, 1997–98
- Robbie Nicol Cup: 1988–89, 1995–96
- Robertson Cup: 1969–70, 1980–81, 1982–83
- Stewart Memorial Cup: 1970–71, 1977–78, 1980–81, 1987–88, 1995–96
- Connon Cup: 1973–74, 1974–75, 1986–87, 1987–88
- North of Scotland (Morayshire) Cup: 1980–81
- White Horse Cup: 1974–75
- Elginshire Cup: 2011–12, 2017–18
