= Bridge of Don Thistle F.C. =

Association football club in Scotland

Bridge of Don Thistle
- Full name: Bridge of Don Thistle Football Club
- Nickname: Thistle
- Founded: 1983 (as Wilson's XI)
- Ground: Aberdeen Sports Village
- Coordinates: 57°9′46″N 2°5′32″W
- League: NoSFL Premier League
- 2025–26: NoSFL Premier League, 2nd of 16
Home colours	Away colours

Bridge of Don Thistle Football Club is a Scottish football club in Aberdeen. Members of the Scottish Junior Football Association, they play in the North of Scotland Football League.

== History ==
The club was founded in 1983 as Wilson's XI F.C., named after Norman Wilson, the club's first president and main sponsor. Originally competing in the Aberdeenshire Amateur Football Leagues, the club joined the SJFA, North Region in 2000. On joining the Juniors, the club moved from local playing fields into the Hillhead Centre. This ground, originally known as Keith Park, was the purpose-built home of another Junior club, Aberdeen Bon Accord. After Bon Accord folded in 1997, the facility was taken over by the University of Aberdeen who renamed it the Hillhead Centre.

In 2006, Wilson's XI took the name Hillhead F.C. For the 2011–12 season, however, the club renamed themselves Bridge of Don Thistle to broaden their appeal among the local community.

With Aberdeen University joining the Junior grade in 2014, Thistle continued to groundshare between the Hillhead Centre and Aberdeen Sports Village during the 2014–15 season. The club eventually relocated to Gallowshill Park in the village of Newburgh, Aberdeenshire. At the end of the 2015–16 season, the club renamed themselves Newburgh Thistle. In 2018 they reverted to the Bridge of Don Thistle name and returned to Aberdeen, with Aberdeen Sports Village as their new home ground.

The club won promotion in their first season in Junior football.

== Name history ==
Years	Name
1983–2006	Wilson's XI
2006–2011	Hillhead
2011–2016	Bridge of Don Thistle
2016–2018	Newburgh Thistle
2018–	Bridge of Don Thistle

== Honours ==
- North Regional Cup: 2023–24
- NoSFL Grill League Cup: 2025–26
- McLeman Cup: 2025–26
