= Colony Park F.C. =

Association football club in Scotland

Colony Park
- Full name: Colony Park Football Club
- Founded: 1978
- Ground: Colony Park; Harlaw Road; Inverurie
- Coordinates: 57°17′26″N 2°22′54″W
- Manager: Juniors - Scott Steele
- League: NoSFL Premier League
Home colours

Colony Park Football Club are a Scottish football club from the town of Inverurie, Aberdeenshire. Colony Park F.C. was established in 1978 by five local Inverurie men, Dod Reid, Wattie Strachan, Bob Gibb, Frank Heldreth and George Mitchell. They are the largest Juvenile football club in North-East Scotland, running teams from under-7 through to under-19 level. In 2011, they successfully applied for membership of the Scottish Junior Football Association, and joined North Region, Division Two for the 2011–12 season. The junior side now plays in the North of Scotland Football League.

Former Colony players include Barry Robson and Darren Mackie.

The Colony Park facility after which the club is named, was opened in 1977 and until 1999 was the home of Inverurie Juniors, the town's previous Junior side.

Colony lifted their first honour in the Junior game by winning the 2015–16 North Division One (East) championship, completing the league season undefeated. The club won 19 of their 22 matches and their final day fixture at home to Longside was watched by a crowd of 1,356.

== Honours ==
- North Region First Division (East):
  - Winners: 2015–16
- Domino's Pizza Cup:
  - Runners-Up: 2016–17
