= 2022–23 North Region Junior Football League =

North Region Junior Football League
- Season: 2022–23

The 2022–23 North Region Junior Football League was the 21st season of the North Region Junior Football League for SJFA North Region member clubs, and the 2nd season with its top division as part of the sixth tier of the Scottish football pyramid system. The league reverted back to a two-tier setup, featuring a 14-team Premier League and 16-team Championship.

Banks O' Dee were the reigning champions but were unable to defend their title after gaining promotion to the Highland League. Culter won a record eighth title, and their first since 2013–14, winning all but two of their first twenty-four games, giving them an unassailable five-point lead over Hermes, ahead of the latter's final game.

As a result, Culter entered the 2023–24 Scottish Cup at the preliminary round stage.

== Teams ==
=== From North Region ===
Promoted to Highland Football League

- Banks O' Dee

In Abeyance

- Hall Russell United
- Whitehills

=== To North Region ===
- Banks O' Dee Junior
- Lossiemouth United

== Premier League ==
McBookie.com North Premier League
- Season: 2022–23
- Dates: 6 August 2022 – 20 May 2023
- Champions: Culter
- Relegated: Banchory St Ternan; Dufftown
- Matches: 182
- Goals: 658 (3.62 per match)
- Biggest home win: Culter 8–0 Colony Park (19 November 2022)
- Biggest away win: Stoneywood Parkvale 0–8 Stonehaven (9 May 2023)
- Highest scoring: Culter 8–2 Dufftown (7 January 2023)
- Longest winning run: 9 matches: Culter
- Longest unbeaten run: 18 matches: Hermes
- Longest winless run: 18 matches: Banchory St Ternan
- Longest losing run: 7 matches: Banchory St Ternan

Maud were spared relegation after Banks O' Dee's promotion and Dufftown were also promoted after Hall Russell United went into abeyance before the season began.

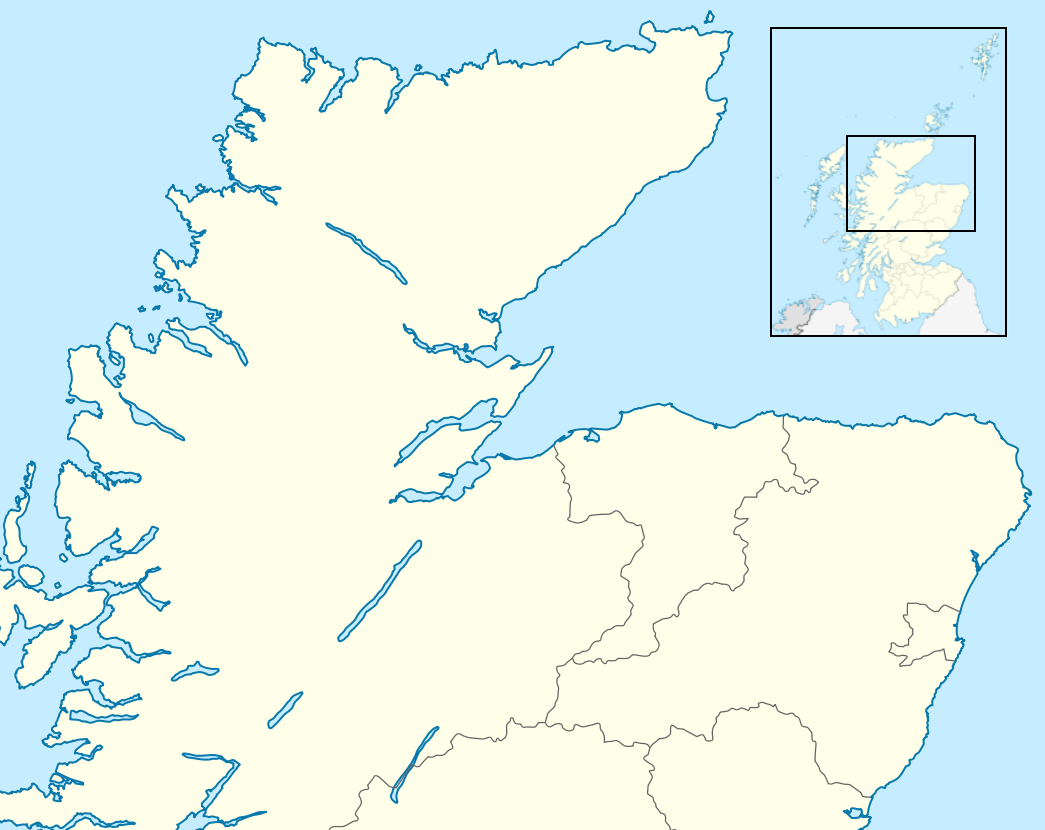
Location of teams in 2022–23 North Premier Division
Location of teams in 2022–23 North Premier Division in Aberdeen

=== Stadia and locations ===
Club	Location	Ground	Capacity	Seats	Floodlit
Banchory St Ternan	Banchory	Milton Park	1,000	0	No
Bridge of Don Thistle	Aberdeen	Aberdeen Sports Village	2,000	500	No
Colony Park	Inverurie	Colony Park	1,000	0	No
Culter	Peterculter	Crombie Park	1,000	40	No
Dufftown	Dufftown	Westburn Park	2,000	30	No
Dyce	Dyce	Ian Mair Park	1,200	0	Yes
East End	Aberdeen	New Advocates Park	1,000	0	No
Ellon United	Ellon	The Meadows	600	0	No
Hermes	Bridge of Don	Lochside Park	1,500	0	Yes
Maud	Maud	Maud Pleasure Park	1,000	0	No
Montrose Roselea	Montrose	Links Park	4,936	1,338	Yes
Nairn St Ninian	Nairn	Showfield Park	1,000	0	No
Stonehaven	Stonehaven	Glenury Park	1,300	0	No
Stoneywood Parkvale	Aberdeen	New Polo Park	1,000	0	No

=== League table ===
Pos	Team	Pld	W	D	L	GF	GA	GD	Pts	Relegation
1	Culter (C)	26	24	1	1	90	17	+73	73	Ineligible for the Highland League play-off
2	Hermes	26	20	5	1	94	16	+78	65	
3	Dyce	26	14	7	5	52	29	+23	49	
4	Stonehaven	26	13	6	7	44	29	+15	45	
5	Bridge of Don Thistle	26	12	6	8	57	35	+22	42	
6	Stoneywood Parkvale	26	12	4	10	47	50	−3	40	
7	East End	26	11	5	10	52	40	+12	38	
8	Ellon United	26	10	4	12	41	50	−9	34	
9	Montrose Roselea	26	9	6	11	42	49	−7	33	Transfer to the Midlands League
10	Maud	26	7	3	16	30	60	−30	24	
11	Colony Park	26	6	5	15	28	69	−41	23	
12	Nairn St Ninian	26	5	5	16	38	71	−33	20	
13	Banchory St Ternan (Note: Banchory St Ternan deducted three points for fielding ineligible players in their match against Hermes on 15 April.) (R)	26	3	3	20	23	76	−53	9	Relegation to the Championship
14	Dufftown (Note: Dufftown deducted seven points for fielding ineligible players in their matches against Bridge of Don Thistle on 11 April and East End on 13 May.) (R)	26	3	6	17	22	69	−47	8	Relegation to the Championship

Rules for classification: 1) Points; 2) Goal difference; 3) Goals scored.
(C) Champions; (R) Relegated

=== Results ===
Home \ Away	BST	BOD	COL	CUL	DUF	DYC	EAS	ELL	HER	MAU	MON	NAI	SHN	SWP
Banchory St Ternan	—	1–1	2–4	0–4	2–0	1–5	1–3	3–3	0–5	0–0	2–0	4–3	0–4	1–4
Bridge of Don Thistle	4–1	—	5–1	0–3	6–0	0–2	4–5	1–0	2–2	0–3	4–0	1–1	2–3	5–0
Colony Park	3–0	0–3	—	0–3	3–1	2–2	0–1	0–0	0–7	4–2	0–2	1–3	0–3	0–3
Culter	4–1	6–0	8–0	—	8–2	1–1	2–1	6–1	4–1	3–1	4–0	3–1	3–0	5–1
Dufftown	3–1	0–1	1–0	0–2	—	1–1	2–2	1–2	0–5	1–2	1–5	1–1	0–3	1–1
Dyce	3–0	2–2	5–0	1–3	2–0	—	4–1	2–0	1–2	2–0	0–1	2–2	0–0	2–0
East End	5–0	2–1 (Note: Match played at Denmore Park, Bridge of Don.)	2–2 (Note: Match played at Balmoral Stadium, Cove Bay.)	0–1	3–0	1–2	—	2–2	0–2	0–1	2–3	3–0	1–2	1–3
Ellon United	2–1	0–3	1–2	0–4	2–0	0–1	1–4	—	1–3	4–1	3–2	3–1	1–0	4–0
Hermes	1–0	1–1	4–0	2–0	7–0	7–0	0–0	5–1	—	6–1	5–2	6–0	1–0	1–1
Maud	1–0	0–6	3–4	1–2	1–2	0–4	0–2	2–1	0–5	—	3–2	3–5	0–0	1–2
Montrose Roselea	2–0	0–1	0–0	1–2	2–1	1–1	3–4	2–1	1–1 (Note: Match played at Broomfield Park, due to a clashing Scottish Cup fixture for Montrose at Links Park.)	2–2	—	2–0	2–2	2–2
Nairn St Ninian	4–1	2–0	1–1	1–4	2–2	2–5	1–5	0–3	1–8	1–0	3–4	—	1–2	1–2
Stonehaven	2–1	0–0	3–0	0–2	1–1	2–1	2–2	1–2	0–5	2–1	2–1	1–0	—	1–2
Stoneywood Parkvale	6–0	0–4	4–1	1–3	4–1	0–1	1–0	3–3	0–2	0–1	3–0	4–1	0–8	—

Legend: Blue = home team win; Yellow = draw; Red = away team win.

== Championship ==
McBookie.com North Championship
- Season: 2022–23
- Dates: 6 August 2022 – 27 May 2023
- Champions: Sunnybank
- Promoted: Buchanhaven Hearts; Fraserburgh United; Newmachar United; Rothie Rovers; Sunnybank
- Matches: 240
- Goals: 892 (3.72 per match)
- Biggest home win: Forres Thistle 9–1 Deveronside (15 October 2022)
- Biggest away win: Lossiemouth United 1–10 Banks O' Dee Juniors (17 September 2022)
- Highest scoring: Lossiemouth United 1–10 Banks O' Dee Juniors (17 September 2022)
- Longest winning run: 9 matches: Newmachar United
- Longest unbeaten run: 14 matches: Sunnybank
- Longest winless run: 10 matches: New Elgin
- Longest losing run: 8 matches: New Elgin

The First and Second Divisions were merged to form the Championship. Sunnybank won the division by seven points over Fraserburgh United

=== League table ===
Pos	Team	Pld	W	D	L	GF	GA	GD	Pts	Qualification or relegation
1	Sunnybank (C, P)	30	23	4	3	80	23	+57	73	Promotion to the Premier League
2	Fraserburgh United (P)	30	21	3	6	85	38	+47	66	Promotion to the Premier League
3	Rothie Rovers (P)	30	20	5	5	76	27	+49	65	Promotion to the Premier League
4	Buchanhaven Hearts (P)	30	19	4	7	65	39	+26	61	Promotion to the Premier League
5	Newmachar United (P)	30	19	3	8	71	38	+33	60	Promotion to the Premier League
6	Forres Thistle	30	18	5	7	60	31	+29	59	
7	Banks O' Dee Juniors	30	15	4	11	85	53	+32	49	
8	Islavale (Note: Islavale deducted three points for fielding ineligible players in their match against Buchanhaven Hearts on 22 April.)	30	15	1	14	47	51	−4	43	
9	Longside	30	10	7	13	57	52	+5	37	
10	Burghead Thistle	30	9	6	15	40	65	−25	33	
11	Glentanar	30	10	1	19	43	66	−23	31	
12	Deveronside	30	8	4	18	42	74	−32	28	
13	Aberdeen University (Note: Aberdeen University deducted six points for fielding ineligible players in their matches against Lossiemouth United on 29 April and Buchanhaven Hearts on 13 May.)	30	9	4	17	53	72	−19	25	
14	Cruden Bay	30	5	5	20	31	65	−34	20	
15	Lossiemouth United (Note: Lossiemouth United deducted six points for fielding ineligible players.)	30	5	4	21	33	93	−60	13	
16	New Elgin	30	3	2	25	24	105	−81	11	

Rules for classification: 1) Points; 2) Goal difference; 3) Goals scored.
(C) Champions; (P) Promoted

=== Results ===
Home \ Away	AUV	BOD	BHU	BGT	CDB	DVS	FST	FBU	GTR	ILV	LGS	LMU	NWE	NWM	RTH	SNY
Aberdeen University	—	1–1	1–2	4–3	4–1	5–2	1–6	1–3	0–2	2–3	3–1	0–1 (Note: Match initially finished 0–0, but was later awarded to Lossiemouth United after Aberdeen University fielded ineligible players.)	3–0	2–4	0–3	0–4
Banks O' Dee Juniors	6–1	—	1–2	2–0	5–1	3–4	1–0	2–0	6–1	3–2	1–1	2–2	7–0	3–0	3–2	0–4
Buchanhaven Hearts	4–2	3–1	—	1–1	2–2	2–1	2–0	2–1	2–1	6–0	2–2	5–1	2–0	3–0	6–1	0–1
Burghead Thistle	1–1	3–2	3–0	—	2–0	0–2	1–1	1–2	1–1	0–1	1–7	3–2	4–1	1–2	0–2	0–4
Cruden Bay	1–1	3–2	1–3	1–2	—	5–0	1–3	1–3	1–2	0–4	1–1	0–1	1–1	0–3	0–2	0–1
Deveronside	3–1	2–5	1–4	1–2	0–2	—	0–1	2–1	3–2	1–2	2–5	0–0 (Note: Match played at Canal Park, Banff.)	3–0	3–3	0–2	2–3
Forres Thistle	1–0	2–0	0–0	4–0	3–0	9–1	—	3–1	4–0	1–0	1–0	2–0	3–2	2–1	0–2	1–1
Fraserburgh United	7–0	4–3	4–0	7–0	5–0	2–1	2–3	—	2–1	3–2	1–1	5–0	4–0	5–2	3–1	0–3
Glentanar	0–1	2–3	1–4	1–2	4–2	1–2	1–0	0–1	—	0–2	2–1	3–0	6–2	1–4	1–2	1–6
Islavale	3–1	1–3	0–1 (Note: Match initially finished 4–3 to Islavale, but was later awarded to Buchanhaven Hearts after Islavale fielded ineligible players.)	2–1	0–2	3–2	1–0	1–4	3–1	—	1–0	4–0	2–0	3–4	0–1	0–1
Longside	2–0	3–0	3–1	2–2	3–4	0–0	3–3	1–2	1–2	1–0	—	4–2	4–1	1–3	0–3	0–3
Lossiemouth United	1–5	1–10	2–0	2–5	3–0	2–1	1–1	2–2 (Note: Match played at Grant Park.)	2–3	1–3	1–5	—	1–4	1–6	0–5	2–5
New Elgin	0–6	0–7	1–3	0–0	1–0	1–3	1–4	1–4	0–2	1–2	2–3	2–1	—	0–5	0–7	2–3
Newmachar United	1–2	2–0	1–2	2–0	1–0	0–0	0–1	1–3	4–1	7–1	3–1	3–1	4–0	—	1–0	2–0
Rothie Rovers	3–3	3–3	4–0	5–0	1–1	4–0	3–0	1–1	2–0	3–0	3–1	2–0	6–1	0–1	—	1–1
Sunnybank	3–2	3–0	2–1	3–1	2–0	4–0	5–1	2–3	3–0	1–1	2–0	3–0	5–0	1–1	1–2	—

Legend: Blue = home team win; Yellow = draw; Red = away team win.
