= 2012–13 North Superleague =

PMAC Group Superleague
- Season: 2012–13
- Champions: Culter
- Relegated: Lewis United; Fraserburgh United
- Matches: 182
- Goals: 718 (3.95 per match)
- Biggest home win: FC Stoneywood 8–0 Fraserburgh United; 6 April 2013
- Biggest away win: Fraserburgh United 1–9 Culter; 30 March 2013
- Highest scoring: Fraserburgh United 3–7 FC Stoneywood; 15 September 2012; Fraserburgh United 1–9 Culter; 30 March 2013
- Longest winning run: Culter (8); 16 February 2013 – 23 April 2013
- Longest unbeaten run: Culter (15); 6 October 2012 – 23 April 2013
- Longest losing run: Fraserburgh United (13); 2 February 2013 – season end

The 2012–13 North Superleague was the twelfth staging of the North Superleague, the highest tier of league competition in the North Region of the Scottish Junior Football Association. The season began on 4 August 2012. The winners of this competition gain direct entry to round one of the 2013–14 Scottish Cup.

Culter won the championship on 4 May 2013, the club's sixth Superleague title.

== Member clubs for the 2012–13 season ==
Hermes were the reigning champions. North Division One winners Inverness City were ineligible for promotion to the Superleague on ground criteria. Division One runners-up Fraserburgh United replaced the relegated Sunnybank.

Deveronside, who finished third in Division One, defeated thirteenth placed Forres Thistle 7–1 in a play-off arranged to decide the final promotion/relegation spot.

Club	Location	Ground	Manager	Finishing position 2011–12
Banchory St. Ternan	Crathes	Milton Park	Sandy Carrol	7th
Banks O' Dee	Aberdeen	Spain Park	Doug Baxter	5th
Culter	Peterculter	Crombie Park	Gary Thow & Andy Gibson	4th
Deveronside	Banff	Canal Park	Rob Scott & Craig Ewen	North Division One, 3rd
Dyce Juniors	Dyce	Ian Mair Park	Tom McPherson	3rd
Ellon United	Ellon	The Meadows	Bruce Morrison	8th
Fraserburgh United	Fraserburgh	College Park	Gary Sim	North Division One, 2nd
Hall Russell United	Bridge of Don	Denmore Park	John Carroll	10th
Hermes	Bridge of Don	Uniconn Park	Neil Dawson	Champions
Lewis United	Aberdeen	Aberdeen Sports Village	Ian Davidson & Darren Paul	11th
Longside	Longside	Davidson Park	Dave Cormie	9th
Maud	Maud	Maud Pleasure Park	Allan Hale & Gary Mann	12th
Stonehaven	Stonehaven	Glenury Park	Derek Allan	2nd
FC Stoneywood	Aberdeen	Polo Park	Graeme Laird & Phil Leslie	6th

== League table ==
Pos	Team	Pld	W	D	L	GF	GA	GD	Pts	Qualification or relegation
1	Culter (C)	26	21	1	4	92	29	+63	64	Qualification for 2013–14 Scottish Cup
2	Dyce Juniors	26	17	3	6	60	38	+22	54	
3	Hermes	26	15	2	9	63	43	+20	47	
4	Banks O' Dee	26	13	5	8	58	38	+20	44	
5	Deveronside	26	13	3	10	42	50	−8	42	
6	FC Stoneywood	26	12	5	9	63	44	+19	41	
7	Stonehaven	26	10	7	9	64	47	+17	37	
8	Maud	26	11	4	11	55	52	+3	37	
9	Ellon United	26	9	8	9	39	40	−1	35	
10	Banchory St. Ternan	26	10	2	14	43	69	−26	32	
11	Longside	26	9	2	15	46	61	−15	29	
12	Hall Russell United	26	6	9	11	36	50	−14	27	
13	Lewis United (R)	26	5	3	18	35	73	−38	18	Relegation to North Division One
14	Fraserburgh United (R)	26	4	0	22	24	86	−62	12	Relegation to North Division One

Updated to match(es) played on 28 May 2013. Source: North Region JFA
Rules for classification: 1) points; 2) goal difference; 3) number of goals scored.
(C) Champions; (R) Relegated

== Results ==
Home \ Away	BST	BOD	CUL	DVS	DYC	ELL	FRAS	HRU	HER	LEWI	LONG	MAU	SHV	STWD
Banchory St. Ternan		0–4	0–7	0–3	1–5	3–3	2–0	1–1	3–2	1–0	1–2	4–0	3–2	2–1
Banks O' Dee	7–2		2–3	1–2	5–1	1–0	5–1	3–1	0–5	1–0	1–2	6–1	3–2	2–2
Culter	5–0	2–0		7–1	1–3	3–1	6–1	3–0	2–1	5–2	2–1	2–3	1–0	1–2
Deveronside	4–1	1–0	1–4		4–3	3–1	0–1	1–1	2–1	3–2	1–2	0–1	1–4	3–2
Dyce Juniors	1–2	2–2	0–6	3–0		1–1	2–1	2–0	2–1	2–1	2–0	1–0	5–3	1–1
Ellon United	3–4	0–1	0–3	0–0	1–0		0–1	0–0	2–2	1–0	1–1	2–1	3–2	1–0
Fraserburgh United	0–3	1–3	1–9	0–2	0–4	2–3		1–4	1–2	4–2	0–2	1–2	3–2	3–7
Hall Russell United	2–1	1–1	3–2	1–2	0–3	1–4	1–0		1–2	3–3	0–2	0–3	2–2	2–0
Hermes	2–0	3–0	0–2	1–2	2–3	1–3	2–0	3–2		5–0	6–1	2–2	4–3	2–0
Lewis United	2–0	0–0	0–6	3–0	0–5	1–2	4–2	1–1	1–2		4–3	1–4	2–3	2–6
Longside	4–2	2–5	3–4	2–3	0–2	2–1	1–0	4–5	4–5	1–3		0–2	2–3	1–3
Maud	2–5	1–3	2–3	1–1	2–3	3–3	4–0	4–2	3–4	2–0	2–3		5–1	2–3
Stonehaven	5–1	0–0	1–1	4–0	2–1	2–2	6–0	0–0	2–3	7–0	2–0	1–1		2–2
FC Stoneywood	2–1	3–2	1–2	4–2	2–3	2–1	8–0	2–2	2–0	4–1	1–1	1–2	2–3	

Updated to match(es) played on 28 May 2013. Source: North Region JFA
Legend: Blue = home team win; Yellow = draw; Red = away team win.
