= 2011–12 North Superleague =

PMAC Group Superleague
- Season: 2011–12
- Champions: Hermes
- Relegated: Sunnybank; Forres Thistle
- Matches: 182
- Goals: 757 (4.16 per match)
- Biggest home win: Culter 7–0 Forres Thistle; 24 March 2012
- Biggest away win: Lewis United 1–9 Culter; 1 May 2012
- Highest scoring: Lewis United 4–6 Banchory St. Ternan; 3 March 2012; Lewis United 1–9 Culter; 1 May 2012
- Longest winning run: Hermes (18); 15 October 2011 – 8 May 2012
- Longest unbeaten run: Hermes (19); 15 October 2011 – season end
- Longest winless run: Sunnybank (21); 20 August 2011 – 31 March 2012
- Longest losing run: Sunnybank (14); 22 October 2011 – 31 March 2012

The 2011–12 North Superleague was the eleventh staging of the North Superleague, the highest tier of league competition in the North Region of the Scottish Junior Football Association. The season began on 6 August 2011. The winners of this competition gain direct entry to round one of the 2012–13 Scottish Cup.

Hermes secured the title on 2 May 2012, becoming North Superleague champions for the first time.

The North Region management committee decreed in May 2012 that two of the clubs eligible for promotion, Inverness City and Deveronside, did not fulfil ground requirements for Superleague membership, and there would therefore only be one relegation place this season as opposed to the normal two. This decision was overturned on appeal by the SJFA and Deveronside will be allowed to contest a play-off with Forres Thistle to decide the final promotion/relegation spot, subject to ground improvements being carried out before the date of the tie.

== Member clubs for the 2011–12 season ==
Culter are the reigning champions. North Division One winners Inverness City were ineligible for promotion to the Superleague on ground criteria. Division One runners-up Forres Thistle replace the relegated Fraserburgh United. A play-off was arranged between 13th placed Longside and Glentanar who finished 3rd in Division One to decide the final promotion/relegation spot. This was won by Longside who retain their place in the Superleague.

Club	Location	Ground	Manager	Finishing position 2010–11
Banchory St. Ternan	Crathes	Milton Park	Sandy Carrol	6th
Banks O' Dee	Aberdeen	Spain Park	Doug Will & Kevin Will	4th
Culter	Peterculter	Crombie Park	Gary Thow & Andy Gibson	Champions
Dyce Juniors	Dyce	Ian Mair Park	Andy Milne	5th
Ellon United	Ellon	The Meadows	Craig Stewart	11th
Forres Thistle	Forres	Logie Park	Kevin Walker	North Division One, 2nd
Hall Russell United	Bridge of Don	Denmore Park	John Carroll	2nd
Hermes	Bridge of Don	Lochside Park	Neil Dawson & Steve Mearns	3rd
Lewis United	Aberdeen	Aberdeen Sports Village	Ian Davidson & Darren Paul	8th
Longside	Longside	Davidson Park	Nat Porter	13th
Maud	Maud	Maud Pleasure Park	Allan Hale & Gary Mann	9th
Stonehaven	Stonehaven	Glenury Park	Doug Baxter	10th
FC Stoneywood	Aberdeen	Polo Park	Graeme Laird & Phil Leslie	12th
Sunnybank	Aberdeen	Heathryfold Park	Allan Smith	7th

=== Managerial changes ===
Club	Outgoing manager	Manner of departure	Date of vacancy	Position in table	Incoming manager	Date of appointment
Maud	Ian Bruce	Sacked	9 May 2012	12th	Allan Hale & Gary Mann	15 May 2012

== Table ==
Pos	Team	Pld	W	D	L	GF	GA	GD	Pts	Qualification or relegation
1	Hermes (C)	26	24	1	1	79	16	+63	73	Qualification for 2012–13 Scottish Cup
2	Stonehaven	26	19	2	5	69	33	+36	59	
3	Dyce Juniors	26	16	5	5	63	43	+20	53	
4	Culter	26	16	4	6	92	43	+49	52	
5	Banks O' Dee	26	14	5	7	55	30	+25	47	
6	FC Stoneywood	26	14	1	11	63	47	+16	43	
7	Banchory St. Ternan	26	12	2	12	62	64	−2	38	
8	Ellon United	26	12	1	13	45	55	−10	37	
9	Longside	26	11	2	13	50	67	−17	35	
10	Hall Russell United	26	9	5	12	40	46	−6	32	
11	Lewis United	26	6	1	19	40	80	−40	19	
12	Maud	26	5	3	18	41	76	−35	18	
13	Forres Thistle (R)	26	5	1	20	21	70	−49	16	Qualification for Superleague play-off
14	Sunnybank (R)	26	1	3	22	37	87	−50	6	Relegation to North Division One

Updated to match(es) played on 31 May 2012. Source: North Region JFA
Rules for classification: 1) points; 2) goal difference; 3) number of goals scored.
(C) Champions; (R) Relegated

== Results ==
Home \ Away	BST	BOD	CUL	DYC	ELL	FORR	HRU	HER	LEWI	LONG	MAU	SHV	STWD	SUNN
Banchory St. Ternan		1–1	1–2	3–1	1–3	3–0	4–0	3–2	2–2	1–3	0–1	1–3	5–3	2–0
Banks O' Dee	6–2		0–4	1–3	1–2	2–0	2–0	0–1	3–1	1–2	2–0	5–3	3–2	5–1
Culter	4–1	1–1		3–1	7–1	7–0	2–3	1–2	3–2	5–0	5–1	2–3	2–4	7–1
Dyce Juniors	6–2	0–0	3–3		2–0	3–2	1–1	0–3	4–3	5–4	4–2	1–1	2–0	1–1
Ellon United	2–3	1–1	1–5	2–3		2–0	3–2	0–3	3–2	4–2	5–3	1–2	0–1	3–2
Forres Thistle	1–3	0–5	1–2	0–2	1–2		2–2	0–7	0–3	0–5	3–2	0–3	1–3	2–1
Hall Russell United	3–2	0–0	0–2	1–2	4–1	1–2		0–3	2–3	3–0	2–1	0–2	3–1	6–3
Hermes	5–0	1–0	1–1	3–0	1–0	3–1	3–1		3–1	6–1	7–1	4–0	4–3	2–0
Lewis United	4–6	0–3	1–9	1–4	0–3	1–0	0–2	0–1		5–2	4–2	0–6	1–2	1–3
Longside	2–3	1–4	3–3	0–4	0–2	1–0	1–0	1–4	1–0		3–0	2–2	1–3	5–4
Maud	1–4	1–2	1–5	1–3	2–0	1–0	2–2	0–2	5–1	1–2		2–4	3–3	4–1
Stonehaven	3–2	2–1	5–2	3–2	2–0	0–1	3–0	1–2	5–0	4–2	3–0		1–0	2–0
FC Stoneywood	4–3	0–2	3–1	1–3	4–2	5–2	0–1	1–2	5–0	2–4	5–0	1–0		5–1
Sunnybank	2–4	1–4	3–4	2–3	1–2	1–2	1–1	0–4	1–4	1–2	4–4	2–6	0–2	

Updated to match(es) played on 31 May 2012. Source: North Region JFA
Legend: Blue = home team win; Yellow = draw; Red = away team win.

== Superleague play-off ==
4 August 2012
14:30

Forres Thistle	1 – 7	Deveronside

Simpson Park, Keith
