= 2024–25 North Region Junior Football League =

North Region Junior Football League
- Season: 2024–25

The 2024–25 North Region Junior Football League was the 23rd season of the North Region Junior Football League for SJFA North Region member clubs, and the 4th season with its top division as part of the sixth tier of the Scottish football pyramid system.

Culter won their third title in a row, finishing just three points ahead of Hermes.

This was the last season before league members broke from the Scottish Junior Football Association to form the North of Scotland Football League.

== Premier League ==
=== Stadia and locations ===
Club	Location	Ground
Banks o' Dee Juniors	Aberdeen	Spain Park
Bridge of Don Thistle	Aberdeen	Aberdeen Sports Village
Buchanhaven Hearts	Peterhead	Raemoss Park
Colony Park	Inverurie	Colony Park
Culter	Peterculter	Crombie Park
Dyce	Dyce	Ian Mair Park
East End	Aberdeen	New Advocates Park
Ellon United	Ellon	The Meadows
Fraserburgh United	Fraserburgh	College Park
Hermes	Bridge of Don	Lochside Park
Islavale	Keith	Simpson Park
Maud	Maud	Maud Pleasure Park
Newmachar United	Newmachar	Charlie Gordon Park
Rothie Rovers	Rothienorman	Forgue Road
Sunnybank	Aberdeen	Heathryfold Park
Stonehaven	Stonehaven	Glenury Park

=== League table ===
Pos	Team	Pld	W	D	L	GF	GA	GD	Pts	Relegation
1	Culter (C)	30	23	5	2	94	30	+64	74	Ineligible for the Highland League play-off
2	Hermes	30	22	5	3	79	30	+49	71	
3	Bridge of Don Thistle	30	19	8	3	75	22	+53	65	
4	Dyce	30	16	7	7	68	45	+23	55	
5	Maud	30	17	3	10	84	70	+14	54	
6	Ellon United	30	12	9	9	63	41	+22	45	
7	Stonehaven	30	13	3	14	44	47	−3	42	
8	Colony Park	30	13	2	15	55	55	0	41	
9	Buchanhaven Hearts	30	12	3	15	37	45	−8	39	
10	Rothie Rovers	30	9	6	15	45	62	−17	33	
11	Banks o' Dee Juniors	30	9	4	17	50	74	−24	31	
12	East End	30	8	6	16	41	66	−25	30	
13	Sunnybank	30	9	3	18	35	75	−40	30	
14	Islavale (O)	30	8	5	17	50	83	−33	29	Qualification for the Premier League play-offs
15	Newmachar United (R)	30	6	6	18	48	71	−23	24	Relegation to the Championship
16	Fraserburgh United (R)	30	2	9	19	28	80	−52	15	Relegation to the Championship

Rules for classification: 1) Points; 2) Goal difference; 3) Goals scored.
(C) Champions; (O) Play-off winners; (R) Relegated

== Championship ==
=== League table ===
Pos	Team	Pld	W	D	L	GF	GA	GD	Pts	Qualification or relegation
1	Lossiemouth United (C, P)	28	22	3	3	97	36	+61	69	Promotion to the Premier League
2	Longside (P)	28	20	4	4	99	34	+65	64	Promotion to the Premier League
3	Hall Russell United	28	19	3	6	100	35	+65	60	Qualification for the Premier League play-offs
4	Deveronside	28	17	4	7	84	37	+47	55	Qualification for the Premier League play-offs
5	Stoneywood Parkvale	28	16	4	8	73	45	+28	52	Qualification for the Premier League play-offs
6	Banchory St Ternan	28	15	6	7	76	36	+40	51	
7	Nairn St Ninian (Note: Nairn St Ninian deducted three points.)	28	15	2	11	84	53	+31	44	
8	New Elgin	28	14	2	12	73	62	+11	44	
9	Burghead Thistle	28	12	3	13	73	66	+7	39	
10	Dufftown	28	11	3	14	64	83	−19	36	
11	Westdyke	28	9	3	16	54	91	−37	30	
12	Glentanar	28	7	5	16	56	88	−32	26	
13	Forres Thistle	28	3	2	23	29	79	−50	11	
14	Cruden Bay	28	3	2	23	20	108	−88	11	
15	Whitehills	28	3	2	23	22	151	−129	11	

Rules for classification: 1) Points; 2) Goal difference; 3) Goals scored.
(C) Champions; (P) Promoted

== Play-offs ==
A promotion/relegation play-off took place between the third-bottom team from the Premier League, and the teams finishing between third and fifth in the Championship. In the semi-finals, the Premier League team faced off against the fifth-placed Championship team, and the third and fourth-placed teams faced one another over two legs.

Semi-finals
Stoneywood Parkvale	2	1	2
Islavale	2	2	4
Hall Russell United	2	2	4
Deveronside (2–3 on pens.)	4	0	4

Final
Islavale	3
Deveronside	2
