= 2023–24 North Region Junior Football League =

North Region Junior Football League
- Season: 2023–24

The 2023–24 North Region Junior Football League was the 22nd season of the North Region Junior Football League for SJFA North Region member clubs, and the 3rd season with its top division as part of the sixth tier of the Scottish football pyramid system. Reigning champions Culter defended their title, finishing 14 points clear of their closest rivals Bridge of Don Thistle and Dyce.

== Teams ==
=== From North Region ===
Transferred to Midlands Football League

- Montrose Roselea

Withdrew

- Aberdeen University

=== To North Region ===
Returned from Abeyance

- Hall Russell United
- Whitehills

== Premier League ==
McBookie.com North Premier League
- Season: 2023–24
- Dates: 5 August 2023 – 15 June 2024
- Champions: Culter
- Relegated: Nairn St Ninian; Stoneywood Parkvale
- Matches: 240
- Goals: 884 (3.68 per match)
- Biggest home win: Culter 8–0 Nairn St Ninian (19 August 2023); Culter 8–0 Maud (3 February 2024); Culter 8–0 Stoneywood Parkvale (23 March 2024)
- Biggest away win: Stoneywood Parkvale 0–7 Stonehaven (11 May 2024)
- Highest scoring: Stonehaven 7–4 Stoneywood Parkvale (22 August 2023)
- Longest winning run: 11 matches: Culter
- Longest unbeaten run: 12 matches: 3 teams
- Longest winless run: 16 matches: Stoneywood Parkvale
- Longest losing run: 16 matches: Stoneywood Parkvale
- All statistics correct as of 15 June 2024.

Culter won their second consecutive league title on 15 May 2024, following a 7–0 home victory over Newmachar United, giving them an unassailable points margin over Bridge of Don Thistle, who were the only team that could have denied them the honours.

=== Stadia and locations ===
Club	Location	Ground
Bridge of Don Thistle	Aberdeen	Aberdeen Sports Village
Buchanhaven Hearts	Peterhead	Raemoss Park
Colony Park	Inverurie	Colony Park
Culter	Peterculter	Crombie Park
Dyce	Dyce	Ian Mair Park
East End	Aberdeen	New Advocates Park
Ellon United	Ellon	The Meadows
Fraserburgh United	Fraserburgh	College Park
Hermes	Bridge of Don	Lochside Park
Maud	Maud	Maud Pleasure Park
Nairn St Ninian	Nairn	Showfield Park
Newmachar United	Newmachar	Charles Gordon Park
Stoneywood Parkvale	Aberdeen	Clark Commercial Park
Sunnybank	Aberdeen	Heathryfold Park
Stonehaven	Stonehaven	Glenury Park
Rothie Rovers	Rothienorman	Forgue Road

=== League table ===
Pos	Team	Pld	W	D	L	GF	GA	GD	Pts	Relegation
1	Culter (C)	30	25	2	3	106	24	+82	77	Ineligible for the Highland League play-off
2	Bridge of Don Thistle	30	19	6	5	71	26	+45	63	
3	Dyce (Note: Dyce deducted six points for fielding an ineligible player in their 3–1 win against Stoneywood Parkvale on 16 December.)	30	22	3	5	69	28	+41	63	
4	Hermes	30	17	5	8	70	42	+28	56	
5	Rothie Rovers	30	14	6	10	58	48	+10	48	
6	Ellon United	30	14	5	11	61	56	+5	47	
7	Fraserburgh United	30	12	7	11	50	58	−8	43	
8	Sunnybank	30	11	7	12	55	55	0	40	
9	Stonehaven (Note: Stonehaven deducted seven points for fielding an ineligible player.)	30	13	4	13	60	56	+4	36	
10	Maud	30	11	3	16	48	70	−22	36	
11	Newmachar United	30	9	6	15	47	68	−21	33	
12	Buchanhaven Hearts	30	8	7	15	37	55	−18	31	
13	Colony Park	30	8	7	15	35	56	−21	31	
14	East End (Note: East End deducted six points for fielding an ineligible player.) (O)	30	11	3	16	41	49	−8	30	Qualification for the Premier League play-offs
15	Nairn St Ninian (R)	30	3	11	16	42	73	−31	20	Relegation to the Championship
16	Stoneywood Parkvale (R)	30	2	0	28	34	120	−86	6	Relegation to the Championship

Rules for classification: 1) Points; 2) Goal difference; 3) Goals scored.
(C) Champions; (O) Play-off winners; (R) Relegated

== Championship ==
McBookie.com North Championship
- Season: 2023–24
- Dates: 12 August 2023 – 18 May 2024
- Champions: Islavale
- Promoted: Banks o' Dee Juniors; Islavale
- Matches: 182
- Goals: 874 (4.8 per match)
- Biggest home win: Deveronside 14–0 Cruden Bay (22 August 2023); Islavale 14–0 Whitehills (24 February 2024)
- Biggest away win: Cruden Bay 0–11 Islavale (27 January 2024)
- Highest scoring: Deveronside 14–0 Cruden Bay (22 August 2023); Islavale 14–0 Whitehills (24 February 2024)
- Longest winning run: 17 matches: Islavale
- Longest unbeaten run: 18 matches: Islavale
- Longest winless run: 26 matches: Cruden Bay
- Longest losing run: 26 matches: Cruden Bay
- All statistics correct as of 18 May 2024.

With a run of 21 wins in 22 games, Islavale clinched the league title on 14 May 2024, with a 4–0 win at Deveronside.

=== Stadia and locations ===
Club	Location	Ground
Banchory St Ternan	Banchory	Milton Park
Banks o' Dee Juniors	Aberdeen	Spain Park
Burghead Thistle	Burghead	Forest Park
Cruden Bay	Cruden Bay	Watson Park
Deveronside	Banff	Myrus Centre
Dufftown	Dufftown	Westburn Park
Forres Thistle	Forres	Logie Park
Glentanar	Woodside	Woodside Sports Complex
Hall Russell United	Bridge of Don	Denmore Park
Islavale	Keith	Simpson Park
Longside	Longside	Davidson Park
Lossiemouth United	Lossiemouth	Phoenix Park
New Elgin	Elgin	Nicol-Togneri Park
Whitehills	Whitehills	Daniel Morgan Arena

=== League table ===
Pos	Team	Pld	W	D	L	GF	GA	GD	Pts	Qualification or relegation
1	Islavale (C, P)	26	22	1	3	105	19	+86	67	Promotion to the Premier League
2	Banks o' Dee Juniors (P)	26	19	1	6	84	28	+56	58	Promotion to the Premier League
3	Longside	26	16	5	5	79	36	+43	53	Qualification for the Premier League play-offs
4	Lossiemouth United	26	16	2	8	85	47	+38	50	Qualification for the Premier League play-offs
5	Deveronside	26	16	2	8	85	48	+37	50	Qualification for the Premier League play-offs
6	Burghead Thistle	26	14	2	10	54	39	+15	44	
7	Forres Thistle	26	12	5	9	56	46	+10	41	
8	Banchory St Ternan	26	11	6	9	62	51	+11	39	
9	Hall Russell United	26	9	7	10	60	46	+14	34	
10	Dufftown	26	8	3	15	73	81	−8	27	
11	Glentanar	26	8	3	15	47	86	−39	27	
12	New Elgin	26	7	3	16	46	72	−26	24	
13	Whitehills	26	4	0	22	25	135	−110	12	
14	Cruden Bay (Note: Cruden Bay deducted three points for fielding an ineligible player.)	26	0	0	26	13	140	−127	−3	

Rules for classification: 1) Points; 2) Goal difference; 3) Goals scored.
(C) Champions; (P) Promoted

== Play-offs ==
For the 2023–24 season, a promotion/relegation play-off was introduced, incorporating the third-bottom team from the Premier League, plus the teams finishing between third and fifth in the Championship. In the semi-finals, the Premier League team faced off against the fifth-placed Championship team, and the third and fourth-placed teams faced one another over two legs.

Semi-finals
East End	1	1	2
Deveronside	1	0	1
Lossiemouth United	3	0	3
Longside (3–1 on pens.)	1	2	3

Final
East End (5–4 on pens.)	0
Longside	0

=== Semi-finals ===
First leg

25 May 2024	East End	1–1	Deveronside	Aberdeen
14:00				Stadium: New Advocates Park; Referee: Jonatan Siluk

25 May 2024	Lossiemouth United	3–1	Longside	Lossiemouth
14:00				Stadium: Phoenix Park; Referee: Rhys Jones

Second leg

28 May 2024	Deveronside	0–1 (1–2 agg.)	East End	Macduff
20:00				Stadium: Macduff Community & Sports Centre; Referee: Dave McLaren

28 May 2024	Longside	2–0 (a.e.t.) (3–3 agg.) (3–1 p)	Lossiemouth United	Longside
20:00				Stadium: Davidson Park; Referee: Graeme Smith

=== Final ===
1 June 2024	East End	0–0 (5–4 p)	Longside	Peterhead
14:00				Stadium: Raemoss Park; Referee: Paulina Ruszniak
