= 2013–14 North Superleague =

PMAC Group Superleague
- Season: 2013–14
- Champions: Culter
- Relegated: East End; Longside
- Matches: 182
- Goals: 732 (4.02 per match)
- Biggest home win: Banks O' Dee 8–2 Longside; 11 January 2014; Culter 8–2 Banchory St. Ternan; 26 April 2014
- Biggest away win: Longside 0–8 Banks O' Dee; 5 October 2013
- Longest winning run: Culter (7); 8 March 2014 – 26 April 2014
- Longest unbeaten run: Culter (14); 24 August 2013 – 22 February 2014
- Longest winless run: Longside (17); 9 November 2013 – season end
- Longest losing run: Longside (8); 28 December 2013 – 8 March 2014

The 2013–14 North Superleague was the thirteenth staging of the North Superleague, the highest tier of league competition in the North Region of the Scottish Junior Football Association. The season began on 3 August 2013. The winners of this competition are eligible to enter the 2014–15 Scottish Cup.

Culter won the title on 6 May 2014.

== Member clubs for the 2013–14 season ==
Culter were the reigning champions.

New Elgin and East End were promoted from the North First Division and replaced the relegated Lewis United and Fraserburgh United.

Club	Location	Ground	Manager	Finishing position 2012–13
Banchory St. Ternan	Crathes	Milton Park	Sandy Carrol	10th
Banks O' Dee	Aberdeen	Spain Park	Doug Baxter	4th
Culter	Peterculter	Crombie Park	Gary Thow & Andy Gibson	Champions
Deveronside	Banff	Canal Park	Rob Scott & Craig Ewen	5th
Dyce Juniors	Dyce	Ian Mair Park	Derek McKenzie & Andy Robb	2nd
East End	Aberdeen	New Advocates Park	Alan Keith	North First Division, 2nd
Ellon United	Ellon	The Meadows	Bruce Morrison	9th
Hall Russell United	Bridge of Don	Denmore Park	John Carroll	12th
Hermes	Bridge of Don	Uniconn Park	Neil Dawson	3rd
New Elgin	Elgin	Nicol-Togneri Park	Garry Wood	North First Division, 1st
Longside	Longside	Davidson Park	Dave Cormie	11th
Maud	Maud	Maud Pleasure Park	Allan Hale	8th
Stonehaven	Stonehaven	Glenury Park	Derek Allan	7th
FC Stoneywood	Aberdeen	Polo Park	Graeme Laird & Phil Leslie	6th

== League table ==
Pos	Team	Pld	W	D	L	GF	GA	GD	Pts	Qualification or relegation
1	Culter (C)	26	22	2	2	87	28	+59	68	Qualification for 2014–15 Scottish Cup
2	Banks O' Dee	26	16	5	5	86	35	+51	53	
3	Dyce Juniors	26	17	1	8	65	42	+23	52	
4	Hermes	26	15	5	6	74	45	+29	50	
5	Maud	26	11	8	7	53	45	+8	41	
6	Deveronside	26	11	6	9	50	46	+4	39	
7	Stonehaven	26	11	6	9	41	47	−6	39	
8	New Elgin	26	9	7	10	44	51	−7	34	
9	Hall Russell United	26	10	2	14	44	55	−11	32	
10	Ellon United	26	8	3	15	37	48	−11	27	
11	Banchory St. Ternan	26	7	4	15	45	78	−33	25	
12	FC Stoneywood	26	5	8	13	48	60	−12	23	
13	East End (R)	26	5	7	14	33	64	−31	22	Relegation to North First Division
14	Longside (R)	26	2	2	22	25	88	−63	8	Relegation to North First Division

Updated to match(es) played on 20 May 2014. Source: North Region JFA
Rules for classification: 1) points; 2) goal difference; 3) number of goals scored.
(C) Champions; (R) Relegated

== Results ==
Home \ Away	BST	BOD	CUL	DVS	DYC	EAST	ELL	HRU	HER	LONG	MAU	NELG	SHV	STWD
Banchory St. Ternan		0–4	1–4	0–3	0–5	3–0	1–0	1–6	1–4	3–3	0–1	1–0	2–2	2–2
Banks O' Dee	6–2		1–3	2–0	3–1	4–1	1–0	6–1	3–3	8–2	2–2	3–1	6–0	4–1
Culter	8–2	2–1		3–1	3–1	4–0	2–1	3–1	1–2	6–0	2–2	5–1	2–1	7–3
Deveronside	5–1	2–5	1–4		2–1	4–1	1–1	0–1	4–3	2–1	2–0	2–4	1–0	2–2
Dyce Juniors	2–3	0–5	2–2	3–0		5–1	3–2	4–2	1–6	4–2	3–0	5–1	0–1	4–2
East End	1–3	3–3	0–3	1–1	1–3		1–0	1–2	1–1	0–1	0–2	1–0	2–0	1–3
Ellon United	1–3	1–0	2–4	2–2	0–3	1–2		3–1	1–3	4–1	0–1	1–3	1–0	4–2
Hall Russell United	1–4	0–3	1–4	1–3	2–3	2–2	2–0		3–3	2–0	0–3	1–2	0–1	1–2
Hermes	4–2	1–0	2–5	0–3	2–3	5–1	3–1	2–3		3–0	3–2	4–1	2–3	1–0
Longside	4–2	0–8	0–4	0–2	0–3	3–5	0–1	1–3	0–4		1–2	1–2	0–3	1–1
Maud	4–2	3–1	0–3	4–2	0–2	1–1	5–4	2–4	2–2	6–0		3–4	2–1	1–1
New Elgin	3–3	2–2	0–1	1–1	0–2	2–2	0–1	2–1	2–2	3–1	1–1		5–0	3–2
Stonehaven	4–3	1–1	2–1	3–2	2–1	3–3	0–0	0–2	1–5	3–2	1–1	4–0		2–2
FC Stoneywood	1–0	3–4	0–1	2–2	0–1	5–1	4–5	0–1	1–4	4–1	3–3	1–1	1–3	

Updated to match(es) played on 20 May 2014. Source: North Region JFA
Legend: Blue = home team win; Yellow = draw; Red = away team win.
