= 2016–17 North Superleague =

McBookie.com Superleague
- Season: 2016–17
- Champions: Banks O' Dee
- Relegated: Buckie Rovers; Deveronside
- Matches: 182
- Goals: 768 (4.22 per match)

The 2016–17 North Superleague was the sixteenth staging of the North Superleague, the highest tier of league competition in the North Region of the Scottish Junior Football Association. The season began on 2 August 2016.

== Member clubs for the 2016–17 season ==
Banks O' Dee were the reigning champions and entered the 2016–17 Scottish Cup.

North First Division (West) and (East) champions Buckie Rovers and Colony Park replace the automatically relegated Ellon United and F.C. Stoneywood.

Bridge of Don Thistle changed their name to Newburgh Thistle at the conclusion of the 2015–16 season.

In November 2016, Deveronside relocated to a new stadium at the Myrus Centre in Macduff from their old Canal Park ground in Banff.

Club	Location	Ground	Manager	Finishing position 2015–16
Banchory St. Ternan	Crathes	Milton Park	Neil Findlay	12th
Banks O' Dee	Aberdeen	Spain Park	Tommy Forbes & Sandy McNaughton	Champions
Buckie Rovers	Buckie	Merson Park	Dave Findlay & Mike Smith	North First Division (West) 1st
Colony Park	Inverurie	Colony Park	Richard Davidson	North First Division (East) 1st
Culter	Peterculter	Crombie Park	Duncan Ord	5th
Deveronside	Macduff	Myrus Centre	John McLeay & Wayne Murdo	10th
Dufftown	Dufftown	Westburn Park	Steve Paterson	8th
Dyce Juniors	Dyce	Ian Mair Park	Mike McKenzie & Murray Rattray	4th
Hall Russell United	Bridge of Don	Denmore Park	John Carroll	7th
Hermes	Bridge of Don	Uniconn Park	Neil Dawson	2nd
Inverness City	Inverness	Lister Park	Jordan MacDonald	6th
Maud	Maud	Maud Pleasure Park	Chris Allsop & Mike Cramp	9th
Newburgh Thistle	Newburgh	Gallowshill Park	Lewis Muirhead	11th
Stonehaven	Stonehaven	Glenury Park	Ian Esslemont	3rd

== League table ==
The relegation play-off format was altered as a result of the North First Division (West) champions, Spey Valley United, declining promotion to the North Superleague. Previously, the bottom two Superleague clubs were automatically relegated with the club finishing in third bottom position, tabled to play-off against the winner of a tie between the two runners-up of the North First Division (East) and (West).

In the revised plan, only the bottom club in the North Superleague will be automatically relegated. The runners-up to Spey Valley United, Montrose Roselea, will play-off at a neutral venue against the club finishing second bottom of the Superleague. The runners-up in the North First Division (East), Sunnybank, have played-off against the club finishing third bottom of the North Superleague, with the Superleague club having home advantage in the tie.

Pos	Team	Pld	W	D	L	GF	GA	GD	Pts	Qualification or relegation
1	Banks O' Dee (C)	26	22	2	2	83	20	+63	68	Qualification for 2017–18 Scottish Cup
2	Dyce Juniors	26	17	7	2	77	24	+53	58	
3	Culter	26	17	5	4	62	34	+28	56	
4	Stonehaven	26	16	7	3	68	28	+40	55	
5	Hall Russell United	26	13	5	8	53	36	+17	44	
6	Newburgh Thistle	26	12	3	11	62	55	+7	39	
7	Colony Park	26	11	2	13	49	55	−6	35	
8	Hermes	26	10	3	13	56	53	+3	33	
9	Banchory St. Ternan	26	9	4	13	49	74	−25	31	
10	Inverness City	26	8	1	17	44	76	−32	25	
11	Maud	26	6	6	14	48	69	−21	24	
12	Dufftown (O)	26	6	2	18	47	84	−37	20	Qualification for North Region League play-off
13	Buckie Rovers (R)	26	5	4	17	39	81	−42	19	Qualification for North Region League play-off
14	Deveronside (R)	26	2	5	19	31	79	−48	11	Relegation to North First Division

Updated to match(es) played on 30 May 2017. Source: North Region JFA
Rules for classification: 1) points; 2) goal difference; 3) number of goals scored.
(C) Champions; (O) Play-off winners; (R) Relegated

== Results ==
Home \ Away	BST	BOD	BCK	COL	CUL	DVS	DUF	DYC	HRU	HER	IVC	MAU	NEW	SHV
Banchory St. Ternan		0–1	3–0	2–4	2–5	3–2	7–1	1–6	0–6	4–4	2–1	3–3	1–3	1–1
Banks O' Dee	3–1		5–1	7–1	1–0	6–1	3–1	0–0	3–0	4–1	2–0	4–0	3–0	3–0
Buckie Rovers	2–4	0–6		1–3	0–1	3–0	4–1	2–4	0–3	3–1	3–2	4–4	3–1	1–1
Colony Park	3–3	0–1	3–0		0–1	5–2	2–1	1–3	1–1	1–2	3–1	1–3	0–3	1–2
Culter	4–1	1–5	8–2	1–3		2–0	3–1	2–2	3–1	1–0	6–0	1–1	2–2	3–2
Deveronside	0–1	2–3	1–1	0–3	2–2		4–2	0–2	1–1	2–1	2–5	1–2	2–3	0–2
Dufftown	2–3	1–3	2–2	4–2	2–3	3–2		1–5	1–3	0–2	1–4	2–4	3–5	3–4
Dyce Juniors	2–1	1–1	3–0	3–1	0–0	11–0	7–0		2–0	1–2	5–2	3–1	5–0	1–1
Hall Russell United	3–1	3–2	2–0	0–1	1–3	2–1	2–3	1–0		3–1	1–0	5–0	1–2	2–2
Hermes	1–2	2–3	6–2	4–2	1–2	3–0	2–2	1–1	2–3		4–2	5–1	0–4	2–3
Inverness City	3–1	0–8	2–0	3–1	0–1	5–1	2–3	2–4	1–1	1–4		2–3	3–1	0–4
Maud	1–2	0–3	6–2	5–1	0–1	3–3	0–3	2–3	3–3	1–3	2–3		2–4	1–1
Newburgh Thistle	4–0	2–3	4–3	0–2	1–4	2–2	2–3	1–2	1–5	4–2	6–0	5–0		1–3
Stonehaven	9–0	2–0	5–0	2–4	4–2	3–0	4–1	1–1	2–0	1–0	7–0	1–0	1–1	

Updated to match(es) played on 30 May 2017. Source: North Region JFA
Legend: Blue = home team win; Yellow = draw; Red = away team win.

=== Superleague play-offs ===
13 May 2017
14:00

Montrose Roselea	5 – 0	Buckie Rovers
Doan 15'; Hester 36', 56' (pen.); McLeod 43'; Aitken 70'	Scorers

Colony Park, Inverurie
19 May 2017
14:00

Dufftown	3 – 2	Sunnybank

Westburn Park, Dufftown
