= 2010–11 North Superleague =

North Superleague
- Season: 2010–11
- Champions: Culter
- Relegated: Fraserburgh United
- Goals: 747
- Average goals/game: 4.1
- Biggest home win: Hall Russell United 7–0 Fraserburgh United; 29 January 2011; Culter 7–0 Stonehaven; 28 May 2011
- Biggest away win: Lewis United 1–10 Hall Russell United; 20 November 2010
- Highest scoring: Lewis United 1–10 Hall Russell United; 20 November 2010
- Longest winning run: Culter (9); 23 April 2011 - 30 May 2011
- Longest unbeaten run: Culter (9); 23 April 2011 - 30 May 2011
- Longest losing run: Longside (8); 11 September 2010 - 20 November 2010

The 2010–11 North Superleague was the tenth staging of the North Superleague, the highest tier of league competition in the North Region of the Scottish Junior Football Association. The season began on 2 August 2010. Sunnybank were the reigning champions. The winners of this competition gain direct entry to round one of the 2011–12 Scottish Cup.

== Table ==
Pos	Team	Pld	W	D	L	GF	GA	GD	Pts	Qualification or relegation
1	Culter (C)	26	19	3	4	92	34	+58	60	Qualification for 2011–12 Scottish Cup
2	Hall Russell United	26	15	3	8	71	36	+35	48	
3	Hermes	26	13	2	11	56	51	+5	41	
4	Banks O' Dee	26	13	1	12	53	41	+12	40	
5	Dyce Juniors	26	12	4	10	53	46	+7	40	
6	Banchory St. Ternan	26	12	3	11	57	56	+1	39	
7	Sunnybank	26	12	3	11	55	56	−1	39	
8	Lewis United	26	11	5	10	57	70	−13	38	
9	Maud	26	11	3	12	48	53	−5	36	
10	Stonehaven	26	11	2	13	56	68	−12	35	
11	Ellon United	26	8	9	9	33	45	−12	33	
12	FC Stoneywood	26	10	2	14	40	65	−25	32	
13	Longside	26	7	4	15	38	58	−20	25	Qualification for Superleague play-off (Note: North Division One champions Inverness City denied promotion. Play-off arranged between team finishing second bottom of Superleague and team finishing third in Division One.)
14	Fraserburgh United (R)	26	3	6	17	38	68	−30	15	Relegation to North Division One

Updated to match(es) played on 31 May 2011. Source: SJFA
Rules for classification: 1) points; 2) goal difference; 3) number of goals scored.
(C) Champions; (R) Relegated

== Results ==
Home \ Away	BST	BOD	CUL	DYC	ELL	FRAS	HRU	HER	LEWI	LONG	MAU	SHV	STWD	SUNN
Banchory St. Ternan		4–2	1–8	2–1	2–1	4–2	2–2	2–1	0–1	5–1	3–3	2–0	4–1	5–1
Banks O' Dee	2–1		1–2	0–1	4–1	0–0	2–3	1–4	6–2	2–4	3–1	4–1	4–0	4–1
Culter	5–0	0–3		4–0	2–2	7–3	3–0	6–0	4–1	3–1	3–2	7–0	5–0	3–0
Dyce Juniors	2–0	0–2	5–2		0–2	4–0	1–1	4–1	1–2	2–2	3–2	4–2	2–3	4–3
Ellon United	3–1	0–2	0–5	3–3		2–1	0–4	0–0	2–1	2–1	1–1	1–0	2–0	1–1
Fraserburgh United	3–4	2–3	1–4	1–1	1–1		1–3	2–0	3–3	3–1	1–2	0–1	1–5	3–0
Hall Russell United	5–0	0–1	1–1	1–0	3–1	7–0		2–1	2–3	0–1	3–1	1–2	1–2	2–1
Hermes	1–0	1–0	5–3	0–3	2–0	4–2	2–1		4–2	3–1	4–2	2–3	3–3	1–2
Lewis United	2–2	1–0	1–5	3–1	1–1	1–1	1–10	4–2		3–2	5–1	0–5	7–2	0–6
Longside	3–2	2–0	0–2	0–1	1–1	2–2	0–5	1–3	3–4		1–0	2–1	0–1	2–3
Maud	2–1	4–3	0–2	1–2	2–1	2–1	3–1	0–4	1–1	1–3		4–2	2–1	2–3
Stonehaven	1–4	2–1	3–3	2–3	4–1	3–2	1–4	5–1	1–7	5–3	1–4		1–1	2–0
FC Stoneywood	0–4	1–2	3–1	3–2	2–3	1–0	3–4	0–6	1–0	3–0	0–2	1–6		3–1
Sunnybank	3–2	3–1	1–2	4–3	1–1	3–2	3–5	2–1	4–1	1–1	0–3	6–2	2–0	

Updated to match(es) played on 31 May 2011. Source: SJFA
Legend: Blue = home team win; Yellow = draw; Red = away team win.

== Superleague promotion/relegation play-off ==
1 June 2011

Longside	1 – 1 (6 – 5 pens)	Glentanar

The Meadows, Ellon

Longside retain their place in the SJFA North Superleague for the 2011–12 season.
