= Scottish Junior Football North Division One =

- Founded: 2003 (22 years ago)
- Folded: 2018
- Country: Scotland
- Number of clubs: 21
- Promotion to: North Superleague
- Relegation to: no relegation
- Domestic cup: Scottish Junior Cup
- Last champions: (West) Nairn St. Ninian (East) Aberdeen East End (2017–18)
- Website: SJFA North Region

The Scottish Junior Football North Division One known as the McBookie.com First Division was the second tier of the North Region of the Scottish Junior Football Association. Clubs at the end of the season would be promoted to the North Superleague. From 2011, the division comprised two West and East sections running in parallel. Two years later the North Division Two, which clubs had previously been relegated into, was abolished as part of this change. From the 2016–17 season, the runners-up in each section played off for the right to meet the third-bottom club in the North Superleague for an extra promotion/relegation spot.

The North region leagues were restructured again for season 2017–18 with the creation of the North First Division and North Second Division (essentially returning to the pre-2011 setup).

== Final Members ==
=== First Division (West) ===
Whitehills return to the league from a season in abeyance. Spey Valley United are a new club formed from the merger of Grantown and Spey Valley who finished 7th and 5th respectively in the 2015–16 First Division (West). Two clubs were also moved to the West Division to balance league numbers. This was done according to rule of which club lay furthest West by longitude. The two clubs switched were Newmachar United and Montrose Roselea. Roselea are new members of the North Region having transferred from the East Region in 2016. In September 2016, Fochabers left their facility in the village and relocated to Bishopmill United's old ground in Elgin.

| Club | Location | Home Ground | Finishing position 2017–18 |
|---|---|---|---|
| Buckie Rovers | Buckie | Merson Park | 4th |
| Burghead Thistle | Burghead | Forest Park | 5th |
| Deveronside | Macduff | Myrus Centre | 2nd |
| Forres Thistle | Forres | Logie Park | 3rd |
| Islavale | Keith | Simpson Park | 6th |
| Nairn St. Ninian | Nairn | Showfield Park | 1st |
| New Elgin | Elgin | Nicol-Togneri Park | 7th |
| Spey Valley United | Cromdale | Cromdale Park | 8th |
| Whitehills | Whitehills | School Park | 9th |

=== First Division (East) ===
Stoneywood Parkvale are a new club formed from the merger of F.C. Stoneywood who finished 14th (last) in the 2015–16 North Superleague, and Parkvale, who finished 6th in the First Division (East). Aberdeen University were expelled from the association at the 2016 AGM for non-attendance and non-payment of subscriptions but were re-admitted shortly after.

| Club | Location | Home Ground | Finishing position 2017–18 |
|---|---|---|---|
| Aberdeen University | Aberdeen | Hillhead Centre | 7th |
| Buchanhaven Hearts | Peterhead | Raemoss Park | 8th |
| Cruden Bay | Cruden Bay | Watson Park | 11th |
| East End | Aberdeen | New Advocates Park | 1st |
| Fraserburgh United | Fraserburgh | College Park | 4th |
| Glentanar | Aberdeen | Woodside Sports Complex | 6th |
| Lewis United | Aberdeen | Aberdeen Sports Village | 10th |
| Longside | Longside | Davidson Park | 3rd |
| Newmachar United | Newmachar | Charles Gordon Park | 9th |
| Stoneywood Parkvale | Aberdeen | Clark Commercial Park | 5th |
| Sunnybank | Aberdeen | Heathryfold Park | 2nd |

== Past champions ==
- As part of North Junior Football League ('East Section' feeding to Premier Division, single group - in parallel with 'North Section'):

| Season | Winners | Runner up | Third |
|---|---|---|---|
| 1990–91 | Fraserburgh United | Crombie Sports | Longside |
| 1991–92 | Buchanhaven Hearts | Longside | Insch |
| 1992–93 | East End | Lewis United | Formartine United |
| 1993–94 | Longside | Hall Russell United | Crombie Sports |
| 1994–95 | Hermes | Formartine United | Banks O' Dee |
| 1995–96 | Banks O' Dee | Banchory St. Ternan | Lewis United |
| 1996–97 | Lewis United | Hermes | Formartine United |
| 1997–98 | Cruden Bay | Aberdeen Lads Club | East End |
| 1998–99 | Banks O' Dee | East End | Buchanhaven Hearts |
| 1999–00 | Cruden Bay | Buchanhaven Hearts | Hall Russell United |
| 2000–01 | Culter | Wilson's XI | Glentanar |

- As part of Scottish Junior Football Association, North Region (feeding to Super League - East and West groups):

| Season | Winners | Runner up | Third |
|---|---|---|---|
| 2001–02 | (West) Strathspey Thistle (East) Aberdeen Lads Club | (West) Nairn St Ninian (East) Lewis United | (West) Forres Thistle (East) Banchory St. Ternan |
| 2002–03 | (West) Forres Thistle (East) Turriff United | (West) Strathspey Thistle (East) Fraserburgh United | (West) Islavale (East) Lewis United |

- As part of Scottish Junior Football Association, North Region (feeding to Super League - single group):

| Season | Winners | Runner up | Third |
|---|---|---|---|
| 2003–04 | Maud | Ellon United | Deveronside |
| 2004–05 | Parkvale | Fraserburgh United | Islavale |
| 2005–06 | Dyce | Islavale | Maud |
| 2006–07 | East End | Maud | Banchory St. Ternan |
| 2007–08 | Banchory St. Ternan | Lewis United | Aberdeen Lads Club |
| 2008–09 | Buchanhaven Hearts | Formartine United | Strathspey Thistle |
| 2009–10 | Fraserburgh United | Inverness City | Stonehaven |
| 2010–11 | Inverness City | Forres Thistle | Glentanar |

- As part of Scottish Junior Football Association, North Region (feeding to Super League - East and West groups):

| Season | Winners | Runner up | Third |
|---|---|---|---|
| 2011–12 | (West) Portgordon Victoria (East) Inverness City | (West) Nairn St. Ninian (East) Fraserburgh United | (West) Newmachar United (East) Deveronside |
| 2012–13 | (West) Colony Park (East) New Elgin | (West) Buckie Rovers (East) East End | (West) Newmachar United (East) Inverness City |
| 2013–14 | (West) Inverness City (East) Cruden Bay | (West) Dufftown (East) Bridge of Don Thistle | (West) Islavale (East) Colony Park |
| 2014–15 | (West) Grantown (East) Bridge of Don Thistle | (West) Dufftown (East) Parkvale | (West) Islavale (East) Colony Park |
| 2015–16 | (West) Buckie Rovers (East) Colony Park | (West) Forres Thistle (East) Fraserburgh United | (West) Nairn St. Ninian (East) Buchanhaven Hearts |
| 2016–17 | (West) Spey Valley United (East) Ellon United | (West) Montrose Roselea F.C. (East) Sunnybank F.C. | (West) Nairn St. Ninian (East) Aberdeen East End |
| 2017–18 | (West) Nairn St. Ninian (East) Aberdeen East End | (West) Deveronside (East) Sunnybank F.C. | (West) Forres Thistle (East) Longside |
