= Isabella Skea =

Isabella Low Skea
- Born: 16 January 1845; Bridge of Don, Aberdeen.
- Died: 7 October 1914 (aged 69); Aberdeen
- Years active: 1866–1908
- Known for: first female head of a large mixed-sex board school
- Spouse: William Skea

Isabella Low Skea (16 January 1845 – 7 October 1914) was a Scottish campaigner for women's rights from Aberdeen who became the first female headteacher of a large mixed-sex board school when few female headships were achieved. Her rise to prominence from a humble background has led to her being described as "the lass o' pairts" as a female counterpoint to the notion of "the lad of pairts" prevalent in Scottish educational philosophy of the time.

== Early life ==
Isabella Skea was born in the Bridge of Don area of Aberdeen on 16 January 1845. Her parents were tenant farmers; George Chalmers and Isabella Low.

Having received encouragement from her schoolmaster, she trained at the Church of Scotland Normal College in Edinburgh circa 1866.

== Career ==
Upon completion of her training, Skea returned to Aberdeen in 1868 where she became Girls' Head of East Parish Sessional School (this would later be known as St Paul Street Elementary School). Then, when the school expanded in 1896, Skea became the overall Headteacher, the first female head of a large (1,000 pupils) mixed-sex boarding school. She stayed in this role until her retirement from the Aberdeen Board in 1908.

Skea was particularly interested in the development of school libraries and opposed teachers receiving payments related to results, deeming the practice educationally unsound. The results achieved by pupils in her charge, however, caused her to be one of the highest paid teachers in Aberdeen by the 1870s.

In the 1880s, she campaigned for university education for women, and wrote a series of textbooks entitled the 'Combined Class Series'.

In the 1890s, she campaigned for better pay and pension rights for women teachers and supported the introduction of 'fresh air' holidays for children living in Aberdeen's slum areas.

Skea was the fifth woman ever to become a Fellow of the Educational Institute of Scotland (EIS) union, the oldest teacher's trade union in the world. The Annual Congress of the Educational Institute of Scotland was held in Aberdeen in 1896. Skea read the final paper of the congress entitled 'The Status of Women in Teaching'.

She stated there were three things which women teachers needed to agitate for until they got them:

1. Higher training.
2. Freer range.
3. Better emoluments.

On the grounds of equal training, and on that alone, could women claim equal status with men. Given that, all the rest would follow, and seeing that 55 per cent of the teachers in Scotland were women, there must be something wrong with the system that kept so many women of force and ability and earnestness in minor positions. She urged teachers to form a high ideal of their profession, and work to improve its position.

== Personal life ==
She married William Skea, a printer/journalist, on Christmas Day in 1884 but she firmly believed that marriage should not interfere with a women's career. The couple had no children but provided a home for their three nieces.

== Death and legacy ==
Skea died on 7 October 1914 in Aberdeen.

Dr. Alison McCall, convenor of Women's History Scotland, described Skea's legacy thus:

We are all familiar with the lad o’pairts, the clever young man who rose from lowly origins thanks to the benefits of a good Scottish education. Isabella Skea rose to prominence by a similar path and demonstrates that lasses as well as lads could make their own way in the nineteenth century.
