= Forres Thistle F.C. =

Association football club in Scotland

Forres Thistle
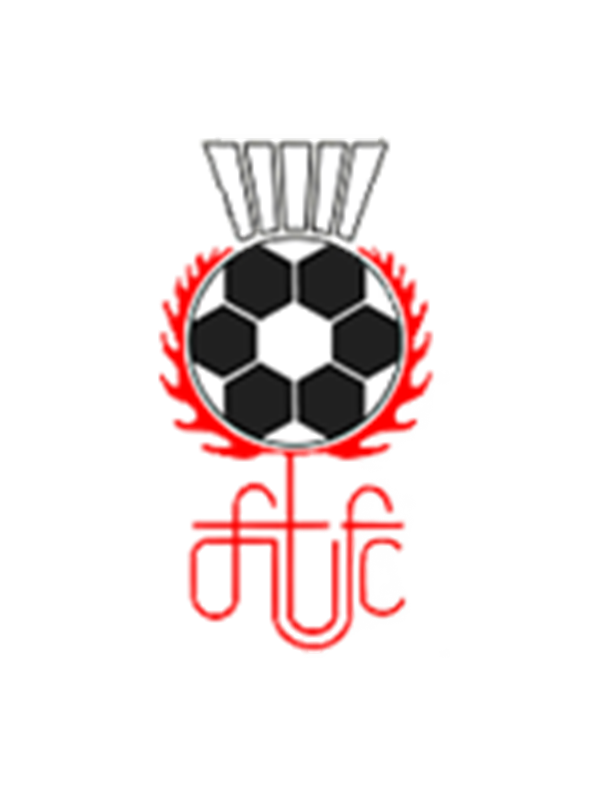
- Full name: Forres Thistle Football Club
- Nickname: The Jags
- Founded: 1906
- Ground: Logie Park; Pilmuir Road West; Forres
- Capacity: 500 (all standing)
- Coordinates: 57°36′10″N 3°37′56″W
- President: Steven Johnston
- Manager: Derek Theman
- League: NoSFL Championship
- 2025–26: NoSFL Championship, 14th of 15
Home colours

Forres Thistle Football Club are a Scottish football club from Forres, Morayshire. A member of the SJFA North Region, the club play in the North of Scotland Football League.

The club was founded in 1906, and the team play in red and white.

== Logie Park ==
Forres Thistle currently play at Logie Park, which is named after the club's former president, Alexander 'Sandy' Logie.

Their first fixture at the ground was a friendly vs Dundee United on October 14, 1990. Notable football players, such as Duncan Ferguson, Mixu Paatelainen and Paul Sturrock, were in attendance. Dundee United won the game 3–0.

Logie Park's current record attendance is around 250, during a Scottish Junior Cup Second Round game vs Pollok.

== Staff ==
=== Management staff ===
Forres Thistle appointed a new Management Team in March 2025. This consists of Derek Theman and Barrie MacDonald, with Keith Simpson and current First Team player Ricky Wardop contributing to the coaching efforts.

In their first game in charge, the new Management Team achieved a significant milestone by securing Forres Thistle's first win in six months, defeating league contenders Hall Russell United 1-0 in an Elginshire Cup First Round match at Logie Park.

=== Board members ===
Position	Name
President	Stevie Johnston
Vice President	Tony 'Chuck' Young
Treasurer	James 'Suds' Sutherland
Secretary	Dutch Holland

== Seasons ==
=== 2021/22 ===
Matches	Wins	Draws	Losses	Goals scored	Goals conceded	Goal difference	Points
24	18	3	3	71	17	+54	57

Top scorer: Mattie Davidson (19 goals)
Biggest win: 7–0 vs Islavale
Biggest defeat: 0–6 vs Tayport
Scottish Junior Cup exit: First Round (0–6 vs Tayport)

Forres Thistle finished a successful league campaign as runners up in Division 2 behind Rothie Rovers. Due to a reconstruction of the league system, Division 1 and 2 were combined into one league, named the Championship. This denied both teams promotion.

Forres Thistle also reached the Edmundson Electrical Elginshire Cup Final, against Dufftown. The game, played at Logie Park, ended 2-2. Thistle lost 5–3 on penalties.

=== 2020/21 ===
The COVID-19 pandemic continued to cause chaos within Junior football, so no league games were played. One regional cup competition started, however, it was not fulfilled to its entirety.

=== 2019/20 ===
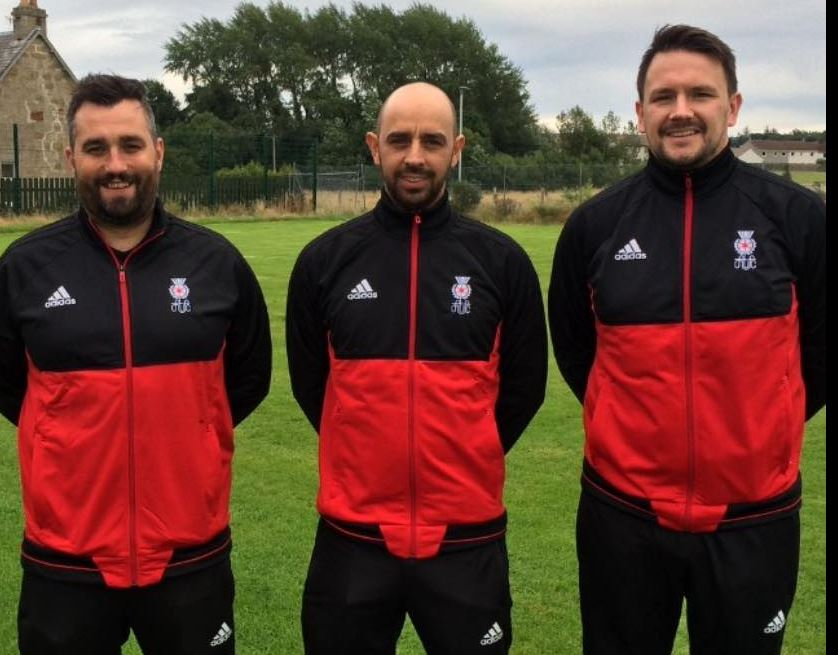
Forres Thistle's previous management team

Matches	Wins	Draws	Losses	Goals scored	Goals conceded	Goal difference	Points
15	12	2	1	53	18	+35	38

Biggest win: 7–1 vs Cruden Bay
Biggest defeat: 2–5 vs Downfield (Regional Cup)
Scottish Junior Cup exit: Second Round (0–3 vs Pollok)

Forres Thistle welcomed a new management team, headed by Tony Ross.

When the league was annulled due to the COVID-19 pandemic, Thistle were second, only a point behind Burghead Thistle with a game in hand.

A record crowd of around 250 people attended Logie Park to watch Thistle face Pollok in the Scottish Cup Second Round.

=== 2018/19 ===
Matches	Wins	Draws	Losses	Goals scored	Goals conceded	Goal difference	Points
24	4	6	14	34	56	-22	18

Biggest win: 4–1 vs Dyce
Biggest defeat(s): 2–6 vs Longside, 2–6 vs Banchory St Ternan
Scottish Junior Cup exit: Second Round (0–3 vs Arthurlie)

The regionalised Division 1 East and Division 1 West were restructured to create a Division 1 and a Division 2. Forres Thistle suffered from a poor season, in which they finished ninth. As a result, they were relegated from Division 1 to Division 2.

=== 2017/18 ===
Matches	Wins	Draws	Losses	Goals scored	Goals conceded	Goal difference	Points
24	16	2	6	60	32	+28	50

Biggest win(s): 5–0 vs Spey Valley United, 5–0 vs Whitehills
Biggest defeat: 0–8 vs Auchinleck Talbot
Scottish Junior Cup exit: Second Round (0–8 vs Auchinleck Talbot)

Forres Thistle enjoyed a successful campaign, finishing third in Division 1 West. With two teams going up, Thistle narrowly missed out on promotion, as Deveronside pipped them at the death, finishing 2 points ahead.

=== 2016/17 ===
Matches	Wins	Draws	Losses	Goals scored	Goals conceded	Goal difference	Points
18	9	0	9	43	40	+3	27

Biggest win: 6–2 vs Burghead Thistle
Biggest defeat: 0–10 vs Montrose Roselea
Scottish Junior Cup exit: Second Round (1–3 vs East Kilbride Thistle)

Forres Thistle finished fifth in Division 1 West.

=== 2015/16 ===
Matches	Wins	Draws	Losses	Goals scored	Goals conceded	Goal difference	Points
16	10	2	4	27	15	+12	32

Biggest win: 4–0 vs Burghead Thistle
Biggest defeat: 1–8 vs Colony Park
Scottish Junior Cup exit: Second Round (0–6 vs St Anthony's)

Forres Thistle had a very successful season under the management of former player Scotty Roy, finishing second in the league, behind Buckie Rovers.

Charlie Beck won the League Player of the Year Award.

Cup double

Forres Thistle also completed a Cup double, defeating Buckie Rovers in both Finals.

Thistle won the Elginshire Cup with a 5–2 win at Borough Briggs, thanks to Charlie Beck's hat-trick.

On June 3, 2016, Thistle won 1–0 in the Archibald Cup Final at Burghead Thistle's Forest Park. A Steven Currie solo effort was enough to clinch the Cup double.

In both Cup Finals, centre-back Chris Ross was sent off for two bookable offences.

=== 2014/15 ===
Biggest win: 5–1 vs Buchanhaven Hearts
Biggest defeat: 0–5 vs Grantown
Scottish Junior Cup exit: Second Round (2–5 vs East Craigie)

Forres Thistle finished the season in mid-table.

=== 2013/14 ===
Matches	Wins	Draws	Losses	Goals scored	Goals conceded	Goal difference
27	13	3	11	51	47	+4

Biggest win: 5–1 vs Fochabers
Biggest defeat: 1–5 vs Dufftown
Scottish Junior Cup exit: Second Round (2–4 vs Kennoway Star Hearts)

Under Ian McLeod's stewardship, Forres Thistle won the Elginshire Refrigeration Cup. They beat Buckie Rovers 3–1 in the Final, at Borough Briggs. Matty Fraser scored two, and Mark Pennie scored one for Thistle.

Thistle finished sixth in Division 1 West.

== Statistics ==
=== 2021/22 ===
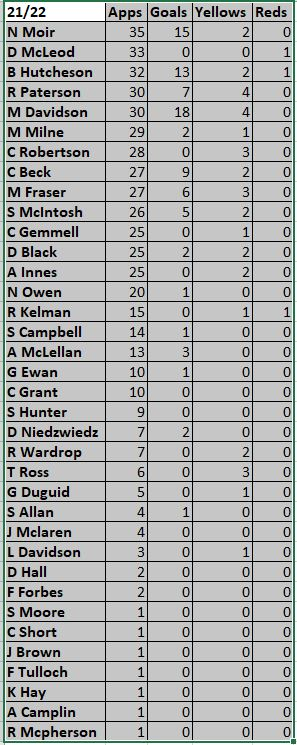
Statistics–2021/22

Top scorers

1. Mattie Davidson: 19
2. Neil Moir: 15
3. Brandon Hutcheson: 13
4. Charlie Beck: 9
5. Ross Paterson: 7

Most appearances (36 game season)

1. Neil Moir: 36
2. Dan McLeod: 34
3. Brandon Hutcheson: 33
4. Mattie Davidson: 31
5. Ross Paterson: 31

=== 2020/21 ===
The 2020/21 season was curtailed due to the COVID-19 pandemic.

=== 2019/20 ===
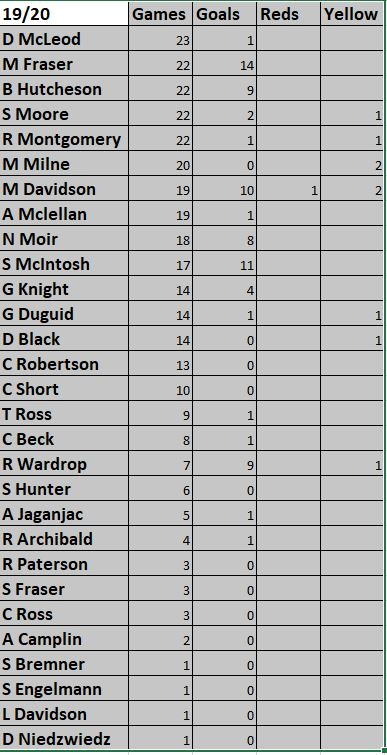
Statistics–2019/20

Top scorers

1. Matty Fraser: 14
2. Sean McIntosh: 11
3. Mattie Davidson: 10
4. Brandon Hutcheson: 9
5. Ricky Wardrop: 9

Most appearances (24 game season)

1. Dan McLeod: 23
2. Brandon Hutcheson: 22
3. Matty Fraser: 22
4. Ross Montgomery: 22
5. Scott Moore: 22

=== 2018/19 ===
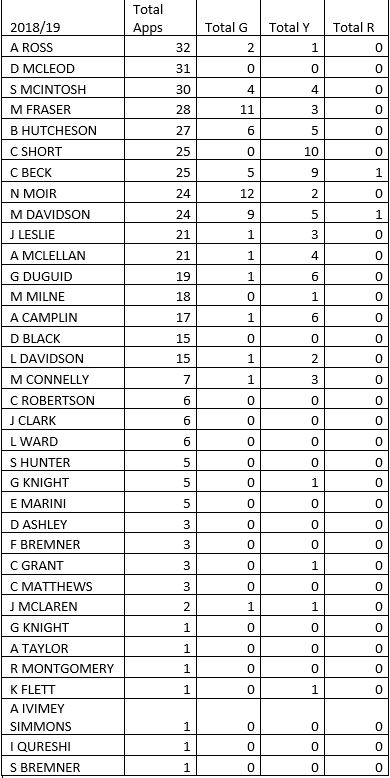
Statistics–2018/19

Top scorers

1. Neil Moir: 12
2. Matty Fraser: 11
3. Mattie Davidson: 9
4. Brandon Hutcheson: 6
5. Charlie Beck: 5

Most appearances (35 game season)

1. Tony Ross: 32
2. Dan McLeod: 31
3. Sean McIntosh: 30
4. Matty Fraser: 28
5. Brandon Hutcheson: 27

== Player awards ==
=== Player of the Year ===
- 2020/21: The 2020/21 season was curtailed due to the COVID-19 pandemic.
- 2019/20: Brandon Hutcheson
- 2018/19: Neil Moir
- 2017/18: Matty Fraser
- 2016/17: Craig Short
- 2015/16: Charlie Beck
- 2014/15: Aaron McLean
- 2013/14: Aaron McLellan
- 2012/13: Donnie McCulloch
- 2011/12: Charlie Beck
- 2010/11: Chris Ross
- 2009/10: Simon Bremner
- 2008/09: Ross ‘Chucky’ Macpherson
- 2007/08: Mattie Davidson
- 2006/07: Davie Raeburn

=== Clubman of the Year ===
The Clubman of the Year Award superseded the Most Improved Player of the Year Award.

- 2020/21: The 2020/21 season was curtailed due to the COVID-19 pandemic.
- 2019/20: The 2019/20 season was curtailed due to the COVID-19 pandemic.
- 2018/19: Lee Davidson

=== Most Improved Player of the Year ===
The Most Improved Player of the Year Award was superseded by the Clubman of the Year Award.

- 2017/18: Brandon Hutcheson
- 2016/17: Dan McLeod
- 2015/16: Danny Black
- 2014/15: Aaron Mclean
- 2013/14: Andrew Taylor
- 2012/13: Craig Daley
- 2011/12: John Ross
- 2010/11: Alan Angus
- 2009/10: Lee Davidson
- 2008/09: Matthew Milne
- 2007/08: Sean Cooke
- 2006/07: Barry Stables
- 2005/06: Simon Bremner
- 2004/05: Gordon Stepien

== Honours ==
- North Region First Division (West): 2002–03
- North Regional (North) League: 1971–72, 1979–80
- Morayshire Junior League: 1926–27, 1929–30
- Gordon Williamson Trophy: 1966–67, 1967–68, 2002–03, 2004–05
- Morayshire Junior Cup: 1925–26, 1930–31, 1953–54, 1970–71, 1973–74, 1977–78, 1991–92, 1999–00
- Nicholson Cup: 1926–27, 1972–73
- North Drybrough Cup: 1972–73
- North of Scotland (Morayshire) Cup: 1952–53, 1957–58, 1958–59, 1968–69, 1973–74, 1974–75, 1975–76, 1978–79, 1984–85, 1985–86
- Robbie Nicol Cup: 1992–93, 2000–01
- Robertson Cup: 1930–31, 1959–60, 1960–61, 1967–68, 1968–69, 1970–71, 1971–72, 1988–89
- Stewart Memorial Cup: 1971–72, 1999–00
- Connon Cup: 1952–53, 1953–54, 1957–58, 1979–80, 1984–85, 1999–00
- White Horse Cup: 1929–30, 1935–36, 1936–37, 1952–53, 1968–69, 1970–71, 1976–77
- Elginshire Cup: 2013–14, 2015–16
- Archibald Cup: 2015–16
