= FTFC =

FTFC may refer to:

== British association football clubs ==
- Fairford Town F.C., Gloucestershire
- Fakenham Town F.C., Norfolk
- Fareham Town F.C., Hampshire
- Farnham Town F.C., Surrey
- Faversham Town F.C., Kent
- Fleet Town F.C., Hampshire
- Fleetwood Town F.C., Lancashire
- Forres Thistle F.C., Morayshire
- Frome Town F.C., Somerset

== Other uses ==
- Full to Finger Counting, in ophthalmology and neurology, to determine visual field

== See also ==
- Falmouth Town A.F.C., a football club in Cornwall, England
