= North of Scotland Football League =

- Founded: 2025
- Country: Scotland
- Number of clubs: 31
- Level on pyramid: 6–7
- Promotion to: Highland League
- Domestic cup(s): Scottish Cup (SFA licensed clubs and Premier League winners); Scottish Junior Cup
- Website: NoSFL
- Current: 2026-27 North of Scotland Football League

The North of Scotland Football League (NoSFL) is a football league based in the north east of Scotland. The league sits at levels 6–7 on the Scottish football league system, acting as a feeder to the Highland Football League. It is split into two separate leagues, the Premier League and the Championship which contain 16 teams and 15 teams respectively. Geographically, the league covers Aberdeen, Aberdeenshire, Highland and Moray. The league is the direct successor to the North Region Junior Football League which had been run by the North Region of the Scottish Junior Football Association from 2001 until 2025.

Subject to clubs meeting the required licensing criteria for the Highland League, the winners of the NoSFL take part in an end of season promotion play-off with the North Caledonian Football League champions, with the winner being promoted to the Highland League. As of the 2025–26 season, no team in the NoSFL meets the required licensing criteria.

== History ==
The North Region Junior Football League had been formed in 2001 to serve the North Region of the Scottish Junior Football Association, but by 2025 the SJFA had seen mass departures by clubs to the newly-grown Scottish football pyramid. In February 2025, the North Region (along with the East Region in charge of the Midlands Football League) applied to leave the SJFA in favour of creating autonomous, Scottish Football Association-affiliated leagues with support from the SJFA (which was rebranding itself as the Scottish Community FA). The application was accepted by all members of Scottish football at the 2025 SFA Annual General Meeting, confirming the creation of the North of Scotland Football League with an identical divisional setup to its predecessor. The first round of matches in the new league were played on Saturday 2 August 2025.

== Member clubs for the 2026–27 season ==
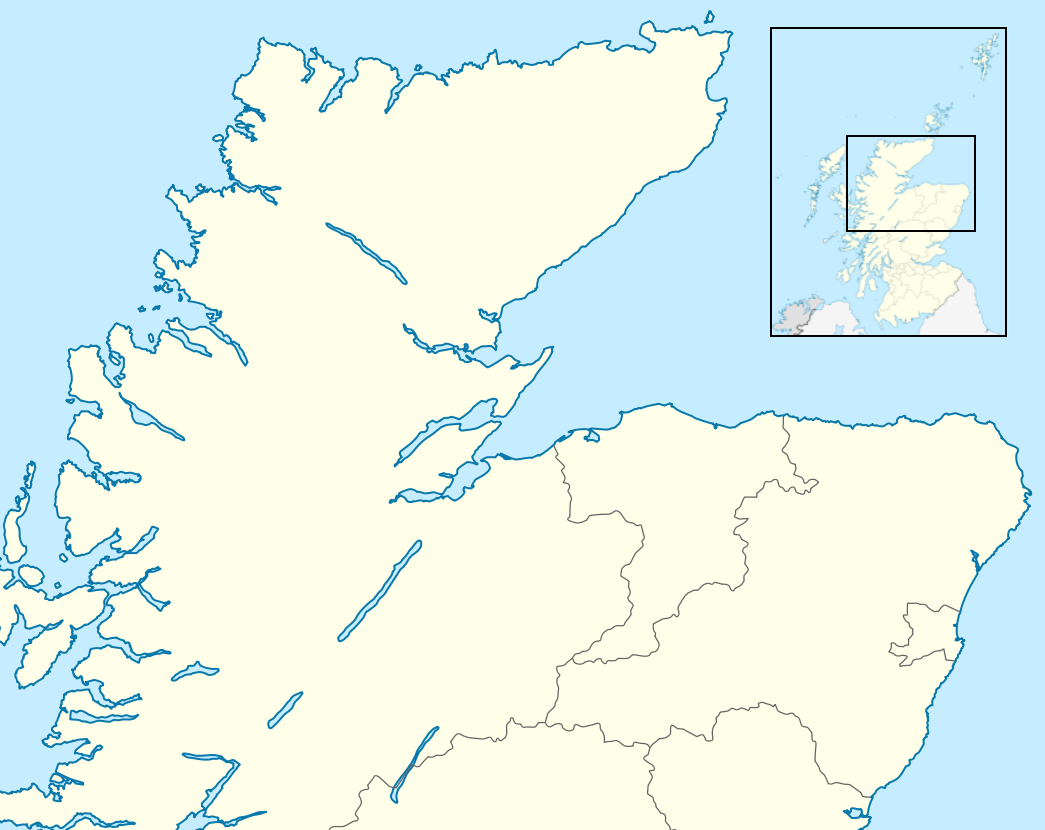
Location of teams in the 2026–27 North of Scotland Football League
– Premier Division
– First Division
Location of teams in the 2025–26 North of Scotland Football League in Aberdeen
– Premier Division
– First Division

The current system sees two clubs automatically relegated from the Premier League, who are replaced by two clubs from the Championship. The third-bottom club in the Premier League enters a play-off with the clubs who finish between third and fifth in the Championship. In the semi-finals, the Premier League side plays the fifth-placed Championship side, and the third and fourth-placed teams play each other, both games over two legs. The winners then progress to a single-leg final.

=== Premier League ===
Club	Location	Ground	Finishing position 2024–25 (NRJFA)
Banks o' Dee A	Aberdeen	Spain Park	11th
Bridge of Don Thistle	Aberdeen	Aberdeen Sports Village	3rd
Buchanhaven Hearts	Peterhead	Raemoss Park	9th
Colony Park	Inverurie	Colony Park	8th
Culter	Peterculter	Crombie Park	1st (champions)
Dyce	Dyce	Ian Mair Park	4th
East End	Aberdeen	New Advocates Park	12th
Ellon United	Ellon	The Meadows	6th
Hermes	Bridge of Don	Lochside Park	2nd
Islavale	Keith	Simpson Park	14th
Longside	Longside	Davidson Park	2nd in NRJFA Championship
Lossiemouth United	Lossiemouth	Phoenix Park	1st in NRJFA Championship
Maud	Maud	Maud Pleasure Park	5th
Sunnybank	Aberdeen	Heathryfold Park	13th
Stonehaven	Stonehaven	Glenury Park	7th
Rothie Rovers	Rothienorman	Forgue Road	10th

=== Championship ===
Club	Location	Ground	Finishing position 2024–25 (NRJFA)
Banchory St Ternan	Banchory	Milton Park	6th
Burghead Thistle	Burghead	Forest Park	9th
Cruden Bay	Cruden Bay	Watson Park	14th
Deveronside	Banff	Myrus Centre	4th
Dufftown	Dufftown	Westburn Park	10th
Forres Thistle	Forres	Logie Park	13th
Fraserburgh United	Fraserburgh	College Park	16th in NRJFA Premier League
Glentanar	Woodside	Woodside Sports Complex	12th
Hall Russell United	Bridge of Don	Denmore Park	3rd
Nairn St Ninian	Nairn	Showfield Park	7th
New Elgin	Elgin	Nicol-Togneri Park	8th
Newmachar United	Newmachar	Charles Gordon Park	15th in NRJFA Premier League
Stoneywood Parkvale	Aberdeen	Stauff Park	5th
Westdyke	Westhill	Lawsondale	11th
Whitehills	Whitehills	School Park	15th

== Seasons ==
Season	Champions
2025–26	Stonehaven

== Cup competitions ==
The NoSFL runs a league cup competition for all member clubs, currently known as the Grill League Cup for sponsorship reasons. For the league's inaugural season, this competition will be run as a straight knock-out. With 31 member clubs, one team will receive a bye in the first round.
