= 2024–25 Highland Football League =

Breedon Highland League
- Season: 2024–25
- Dates: 27 July 2024 – 12 April 2025
- Champions: Brora Rangers
- Matches: 306
- Goals: 1,094 (3.58 per match)
- Biggest home win: 6 matches: 7 goals (Note: The matches were Clachnacuddin 7–0 Wick Academy on 28 August 2024, Brechin City 7–0 Strathspey Thistle on 7 September 2024, Clachnacuddin 7–0 Deveronvale on 18 January 2025, Brora Rangers 7–0 Strathspey Thistle on 19 February 2025, Clachnacuddin 7–0 Rothes on 8 March 2025, and Huntly 7–0 Keith on 15 March 2025.)
- Biggest away win: Rothes 2–10 Formartine United (3 August 2024)
- Highest scoring: Rothes 2–10 Formartine United (3 August 2024)
- Longest winning run: 9 matches: Brechin City & Inverurie Loco Works
- Longest unbeaten run: 14 matches: Brechin City
- Longest winless run: 18 matches: Rothes
- Longest losing run: 12 matches: Rothes & Wick Academy
- All statistics correct as of 12 April 2025.

The 2024–25 Highland Football League (known as the Breedon Highland League for sponsorship reasons) was the 122nd season of the Highland Football League, and the 11th season as part of the fifth tier of the Scottish football pyramid system. Buckie Thistle were the reigning champions but could only finish in seventh position.

For the fourth consecutive season, the title race went down to the final round of matches – with Brora Rangers ultimately prevailing on goal difference from Brechin City, following fifteen wins in their last eighteen games.

Brora Rangers played the winners of the 2022–23 Lowland Football League in the Pyramid play-off, losing 7–4 on aggregate to East Kilbride who would go on to gain promotion to League Two.

== Teams ==
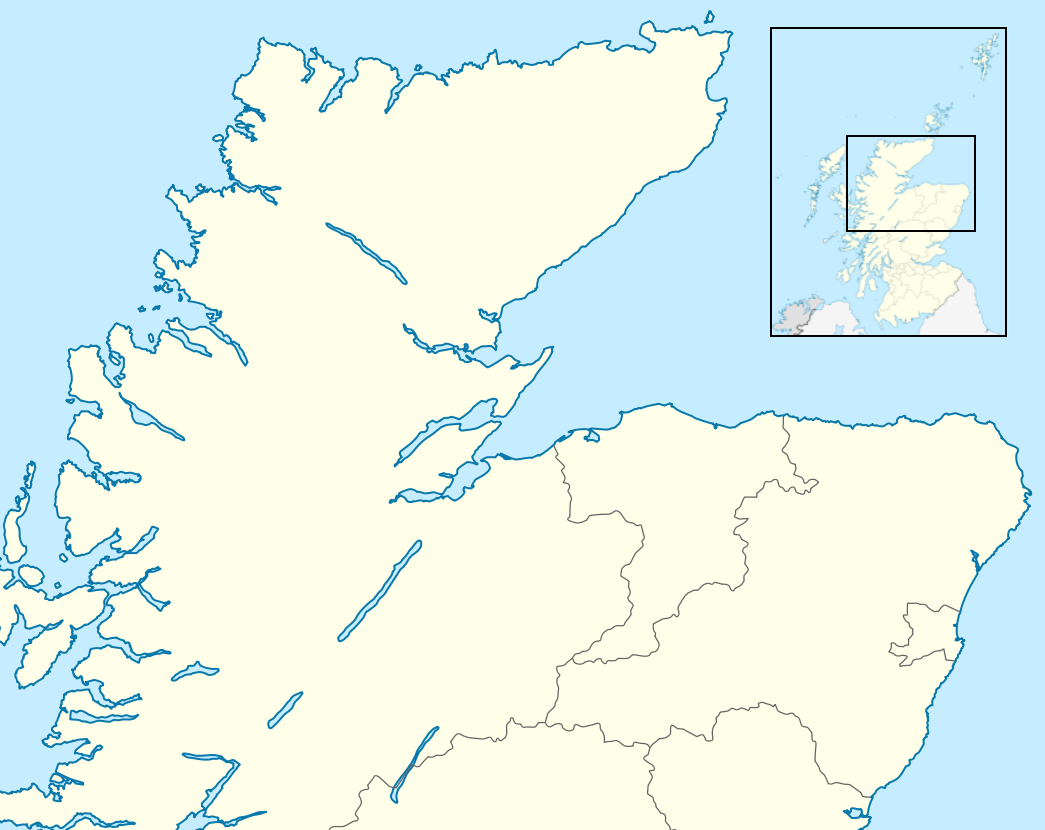
Location of teams in 2024–25 Highland Football League

=== Stadia and locations ===
All grounds are equipped with floodlights as required by league regulations.

| Team | Location | Stadium | Capacity | Seats |
|---|---|---|---|---|
| Banks o' Dee | Aberdeen | Spain Park | 876 | 122 |
| Brechin City | Brechin | Glebe Park | 4,083 | 1,519 |
| Brora Rangers | Brora | Dudgeon Park | 2,000 | 250 |
| Buckie Thistle | Buckie | Victoria Park | 3,000 | 400 |
| Clachnacuddin | Inverness | Grant Street Park | 2,074 | 154 |
| Deveronvale | Banff | Princess Royal Park | 2,651 | 360 |
| Formartine United | Pitmedden | North Lodge Park | 1,800 | 300 |
| Forres Mechanics | Forres | Mosset Park | 2,700 | 502 |
| Fraserburgh | Fraserburgh | Bellslea Park | 1,865 | 480 |
| Huntly | Huntly | Christie Park | 2,200 | 270 |
| Inverurie Loco Works | Inverurie | Harlaw Park | 2,500 | 250 |
| Keith | Keith | Kynoch Park | 2,362 | 370 |
| Lossiemouth | Lossiemouth | Grant Park | 2,050 | 250 |
| Nairn County | Nairn | Station Park | 2,250 | 250 |
| Rothes | Rothes | Mackessack Park | 1,731 | 167 |
| Strathspey Thistle | Grantown-on-Spey | Seafield Park | 1,600 | 150 |
| Turriff United | Turriff | The Haughs | 2,135 | 135 |
| Wick Academy | Wick | Harmsworth Park | 2,412 | 300 |

== League table ==
| Pos | Team | Pld | W | D | L | GF | GA | GD | Pts | Qualification or relegation |
|---|---|---|---|---|---|---|---|---|---|---|
| 1 | Brora Rangers (C) | 34 | 27 | 1 | 6 | 117 | 31 | +86 | 82 | Qualification for the Pyramid play-off |
| 2 | Brechin City | 34 | 25 | 7 | 2 | 84 | 29 | +55 | 82 | |
| 3 | Banks o' Dee | 34 | 22 | 6 | 6 | 77 | 28 | +49 | 72 | |
| 4 | Inverurie Loco Works | 34 | 22 | 6 | 6 | 74 | 33 | +41 | 72 | |
| 5 | Fraserburgh | 34 | 17 | 12 | 5 | 71 | 36 | +35 | 63 | |
| 6 | Clachnacuddin | 34 | 18 | 5 | 11 | 74 | 42 | +32 | 59 | |
| 7 | Buckie Thistle | 34 | 17 | 7 | 10 | 75 | 44 | +31 | 58 | |
| 8 | Formartine United | 34 | 16 | 7 | 11 | 59 | 46 | +13 | 55 | |
| 9 | Huntly | 34 | 15 | 3 | 16 | 66 | 60 | +6 | 48 | |
| 10 | Forres Mechanics | 34 | 13 | 7 | 14 | 69 | 80 | −11 | 46 | |
| 11 | Deveronvale | 34 | 13 | 4 | 17 | 49 | 77 | −28 | 43 | |
| 12 | Turriff United | 34 | 12 | 4 | 18 | 48 | 56 | −8 | 40 | |
| 13 | Nairn County | 34 | 10 | 7 | 17 | 49 | 63 | −14 | 37 | |
| 14 | Wick Academy | 34 | 11 | 3 | 20 | 47 | 77 | −30 | 36 | |
| 15 | Keith | 34 | 10 | 2 | 22 | 33 | 74 | −41 | 32 | |
| 16 | Lossiemouth | 34 | 6 | 2 | 26 | 28 | 79 | −51 | 20 | |
| 17 | Strathspey Thistle | 34 | 4 | 5 | 25 | 40 | 112 | −72 | 17 | |
| 18 | Rothes | 34 | 3 | 2 | 29 | 34 | 127 | −93 | 11 | |

Rules for classification: 1) Points; 2) Goal difference; 3) Number of goals scored
(C) Champions

== Results ==
| Home \ Away | BAN | BRE | BRO | BUC | CLA | DEV | FOU | FOM | FRA | HUN | INV | KEI | LOS | NAI | RTH | STR | TUR | WIC |
|---|---|---|---|---|---|---|---|---|---|---|---|---|---|---|---|---|---|---|
| Banks o' Dee | | 1–3 | 0–2 | 2–0 | 3–0 | 1–0 | 1–0 | 2–3 | 3–1 | 2–3 | 1–1 | 5–0 | 0–0 | 4–0 | 7–1 | 2–1 | 1–0 | 4–0 |
| Brechin City | 2–2 | | 2–2 | 2–2 | 1–1 | 2–0 | 3–1 | 2–1 | 1–1 | 2–1 | 2–0 | 1–1 | 4–1 | 3–0 | 2–1 | 7–0 | 1–0 | 1–0 |
| Brora Rangers | 2–0 | 0–2 | | 4–1 | 1–2 | 5–0 | 6–2 | 3–1 | 2–3 | 2–0 | 3–0 | 2–3 | 5–0 | 1–0 | 7–2 | 7–0 | 5–0 | 5–0 |
| Buckie Thistle | 0–1 | 0–2 | 3–2 | | 1–2 | 6–1 | 1–1 | 1–2 | 1–3 | 1–0 | 2–2 | 3–0 | 2–1 | 2–1 | 5–1 | 8–2 | 4–1 | 2–2 |
| Clachnacuddin | 0–3 | 2–4 | 1–2 | 0–2 | | 7–0 | 1–1 | 4–2 | 0–0 | 3–1 | 2–2 | 2–0 | 5–1 | 0–2 | 7–0 | 2–0 | 3–1 | 7–0 |
| Deveronvale | 0–2 | 0–3 | 3–2 | 1–7 | 1–3 | | 1–2 | 2–4 | 1–3 | 2–2 | 0–2 | 3–2 | 4–0 | 2–1 | 1–1 | 3–2 | 2–1 | 4–1 |
| Formartine United | 0–2 | 1–4 | 0–1 | 1–0 | 1–0 | 2–0 | | 2–3 | 2–1 | 3–1 | 1–1 | 4–1 | 1–0 | 2–0 | 1–0 | 3–2 | 1–2 | 2–2 |
| Forres Mechanics | 1–1 | 3–2 | 1–4 | 1–1 | 1–2 | 1–3 | 1–1 | | 2–2 | 0–5 | 0–1 | 4–1 | 3–2 | 1–1 | 0–3 | 3–3 | 1–6 | 4–3 |
| Fraserburgh | 1–0 | 0–0 | 2–3 | 1–1 | 3–2 | 1–1 | 2–0 | 3–1 | | 4–0 | 1–0 | 4–0 | 5–0 | 2–0 | 6–1 | 3–1 | 1–0 | 1–1 |
| Huntly | 1–1 | 1–5 | 0–5 | 0–1 | 1–2 | 1–2 | 2–0 | 3–4 | 0–1 | | 0–2 | 7–0 | 2–1 | 2–1 | 3–1 | 5–0 | 3–5 | 3–0 |
| Inverurie Loco Works | 0–0 | 1–0 | 2–3 | 2–1 | 2–0 | 6–1 | 1–0 | 4–1 | 3–3 | 2–3 | | 1–0 | 4–0 | 2–3 | 3–2 | 5–0 | 4–0 | 2–1 |
| Keith | 1–2 | 1–3 | 0–5 | 3–1 | 1–0 | 3–1 | 1–3 | 4–0 | 1–1 | 1–2 | 0–3 | | 0–4 | 3–2 | 1–0 | 1–4 | 0–1 | 0–1 |
| Lossiemouth | 1–2 | 1–3 | 0–2 | 1–3 | 0–2 | 1–0 | 0–2 | 0–3 | 3–1 | 0–1 | 1–3 | 2–0 | | 0–4 | 3–2 | 2–0 | 0–2 | 1–3 |
| Nairn County | 1–4 | 0–3 | 1–5 | 0–2 | 2–2 | 1–1 | 1–1 | 1–5 | 1–1 | 2–1 | 0–1 | 2–0 | 3–1 | | 2–3 | 3–3 | 2–0 | 3–0 |
| Rothes | 1–5 | 2–3 | 0–7 | 0–3 | 0–4 | 2–3 | 2–10 | 2–3 | 0–7 | 1–6 | 0–4 | 0–1 | 0–0 | 1–4 | | 0–6 | 3–2 | 2–3 |
| Strathspey Thistle | 1–4 | 1–4 | 0–7 | 1–4 | 0–3 | 0–3 | 0–4 | 1–6 | 2–2 | 1–1 | 0–4 | 0–2 | 3–0 | 1–1 | 1–0 | | 1–4 | 2–3 |
| Turriff United | 0–3 | 0–1 | 0–2 | 1–1 | 2–1 | 0–2 | 2–2 | 2–2 | 1–1 | 2–3 | 1–2 | 1–0 | 1–0 | 0–2 | 3–0 | 4–0 | | 3–0 |
| Wick Academy | 1–6 | 1–4 | 0–3 | 0–3 | 1–2 | 0–1 | 1–2 | 3–1 | 2–0 | 1–2 | 1–2 | 0–1 | 4–1 | 4–2 | 4–0 | 2–1 | 2–0 | |

Legend: Blue = home team win; Yellow = draw; Red = away team win.

== Highland League play-off ==
Subject to the tier 6 champion clubs meeting the required licensing criteria for promotion, a play-off was scheduled to place between the winners of the 2024–25 Midlands Football League (Dundee North End), 2024–25 North Caledonian Football League (Invergordon) and the 2024–25 North Region Junior Football League (Culter), with the winners then playing Rothes, who finished bottom of the Highland League. However, none of the tier 6 champions had the required SFA licence and as such there was no promotion to, or relegation from, the Highland League.

This would be the last season the Midlands League would feature as a feeder league to the Highland League, as they would move to become a feeder league to the Lowland League East ahead of the 2026–27 season.
