= Culter F.C. =

Association football club in Peterculter, Aberdeen, Scotland

Culter
- Full name: Culter Junior Football Club
- Nickname: none
- Founded: 1891
- Ground: Crombie Park, Malcolm Road, Peterculter
- Capacity: 2000
- Coordinates: 57°6′12″N 2°16′48″W
- President: Gordon Thomson
- Manager: Lee Youngson
- League: NoSFL Premier League
- 2025–26: NoSFL Premier League, 3rd of 16 (champions)
Home colours	Away colours

Culter Junior Football Club is a Scottish football club from the village of Peterculter, a suburb of Aberdeen. Members of the Scottish Junior Football Association, they currently play in the North of Scotland Football League. The club is based at Crombie Park and their colours are red and white.

== History ==
The club was founded in October 1890 by members of the Culter Cricket Club, but did not play any matches until the following year. The club was originally a Junior club, but spent the 1895–96 and 1896–97 seasons as a member of the Scottish Football Association, entering the Scottish Qualifying Cup in both seasons, although it lost 8–0 in the first round both times, to Orion and Victoria United respectively. As a senior club Culter wore blue and white stripes and played at Culter Park.

The club suffered a tragedy in October 1892, when one of its players, right-back William Wallace, died of injuries he suffered after colliding with a Victoria Rangers player in a friendly between the two sides; the incident had seemed so slight that Wallace continued playing for a short while, but his condition deteriorated overnight.

Culter made history, along with Linlithgow Rose and Pollok by becoming the first Junior football teams to enter the first round proper of the Scottish Cup for the 2007–08 competition. This was due to the SFA allowing up to four Junior teams to enter, if those teams had won one of the three Super Leagues or the Scottish Junior Cup. They have played in the Cup on six occasions, in 2007–08, 2011–12, 2013–14, 2014–15, 2023–24 and 2024–25, reaching the third round on the first three occasions.

The team have been managed since November 2018 by Lee Youngson.

== Honours ==
- North Region Superleague / Premier League winners: 2003–04, 2004–05, 2005–06, 2006–07, 2010–11, 2012–13, 2013–14, 2022–23, 2023–24, 2024–25
- North East Division One winners: 2000–01
- North Regional Cup: 1989–90, 1999–00, 2011–12, 2013–14, 2022–23, 2024–25
- McLeman Cup: 1988–89, 1992–93, 2000–01, 2009–10, 2010–11, 2012–13, 2013–14, 2022–23, 2023–24
- North Region Grill League Cup: 2005–06, 2010–11, 2022–23, 2023–24
- Jim McPherson Trophy: 2023–24, 2024–25, 2025–26
- Archibald Cup: 1987–88, 1989–90
- Jimmy Gibb Trophy: 2000–01
- Aberdeen Cable TV Cup: 1989–90, 1992–93
- Acorn Heating Cup: 2002–03, 2004–05

== Scottish Cup ==
Culter won their very first Scottish Cup proper tie at Crombie Park on Saturday 29 September 2007. They beat Hawick Royal Albert of the East of Scotland Football League, 7–0 in the First Round. They were drawn in a tough second round tie with Vale of Leithen at home, goals from Gordon Farmer and a goal four minutes from time by Graham Cadger was enough to see them progress through to the third round with a 2–1 scoreline. They were then drawn to face Huntly in the third round on 24 November, where their campaign ended in a 3–1 defeat.

In the 2011–12 season, Culter again advanced to the third round—despite losing to Spartans in the second round—as Spartans were expelled from the competition for fielding an ineligible player. They held Partick Thistle to a draw at home before being defeated 4–0 in the replay at Firhill.

In the 2013–14 season, they reached the third round yet again, beating Newton Stewart, of the South of Scotland Football League, 6–0 in the second round. In the third round, they held Berwick Rangers at home, but lost the replay 3–1. In the following season, 2014–15, they qualified yet again, but were beaten 7–1 in the second round by Bo'ness United of the SJFA East Region Super League.

== Sources ==
- Non-league Scotland
