= North Junior Football League =

Scottish football league

The North Junior Football League, also known as the North-East Junior League, was a football league competition operated in northern Scotland (but anchored around the city of Aberdeen) under the Scottish Junior Football Association which operated as the top league in the territory from 1968 until 2001 when a new regional setup was established – although this was very similar to the previous system.

== History ==
In 1968, the Scottish Junior Football Association restructured its leagues into six 'regions', with those local leagues merging in the northern area including the Aberdeen & District League which had been competed for since 1901 and had provided two winners of the Scottish Junior Cup in the 1950s, and the Morayshire Junior League established in 1906. However, outwith the city of Aberdeen (where the only local professional club, Aberdeen F.C. were also based) football in the territory was dominated by the Highland Football League which had member clubs in most of the towns across the Moray Firth and inland. Junior teams that operated in the same towns were invariably run on a smaller scale than their Highland League neighbours, and though technically competing for the same support base and players, had fraternal relationships akin to a farm team model, although formal agreements between them were rare. Even after the 1968 merger, a separate local 'North Section' was established for these landward clubs due to difficulties in travelling regularly to the Aberdeen area where most of the other teams were based. As a consequence of these dynamics, the North League was seen as the weakest of the six regions despite having a larger population than the Fife and Ayrshire regions, and none of its members reached the Scottish Junior Cup final during its 33-year existence.

In 2001 (one year earlier than other parts of the country) a new SJFA North Region was set up, now one of three across Scotland, but with its scope almost unchanged owing to the geography of the area - the existing East and North (re-named West) sections fed the Super League for its first two seasons before a region-wide three-tier model was adopted in 2003. With three stronger district leagues merging to create the East Region and two combining in the West Region, this change further reduced the North's comparative strength, hampered yet more by the defection of four clubs to the Highland League in the 2000s, prompted by some Highland clubs joining the senior Scottish Football League (in turn, the North Juniors also drew new members from amateur football such as the Aberdeenshire AFA). In its first 20 years of operation, the North Region also never produced a Scottish Junior Cup finalist, although its league champions have entered the 'senior' Scottish Cup since 2007 with some credible results.

== Champions ==
Season	Winner	Runner-up	North section (Note: At the end of each season, the North winners played the East winners to determine the overall champions; unless otherwise stated (and bolded), this was won by the East club.)
1968–69	Banks O' Dee	Stonehaven	Burghead Thistle
1969–70	Banks O' Dee	Stonehaven	Buckie Rovers
1970–71	Banks O' Dee	Lewis United	Islavale
1971–72	Sunnybank	Banks O' Dee	Forres Thistle
1972–73	Banks O' Dee	Sunnybank	Burghead Thistle
1973–74	Parkvale	Banks O' Dee	**Burghead Thistle'** (Note: Overall champions.)
1974–75	Sunnybank	Banks O' Dee	Buckie Rovers
1975–76	Sunnybank	Aberdeen East End	Nairn St Ninian
1976–77	Banks O' Dee	Lewis United	Burghead Thistle
1977–78	Aberdeen East End	Banks O' Dee	Nairn St Ninian
1978–79	Banks O' Dee	Sunnybank	Nairn St Ninian
1979–80	Fraserburgh United	Banks O' Dee	Forres Thistle
1980–81	Banks O' Dee	Lewis United	Bishopmill United
1981–82	Banks O' Dee	Sunnybank	Nairn St Ninian
1982–83	Sunnybank	Inverurie Loco Works	Buckie Rovers
1983–84	Banks O' Dee	Sunnybank	Deveronside
1984–85	FC Stoneywood	Mugiemoss	Fochabers
1985–86	Banks O' Dee	Turriff United	**Deveronside**
1986–87	Banks O' Dee	Turriff United	Caberfeidh Juniors
1987–88	Rosslyn Sport	Banks O' Dee	**Deveronside**
1988–89	Bon Accord	FC Stoneywood	Deveronside
1989–90	Stonehaven	FC Stoneywood	**Deveronside**
1990–91	FC Stoneywood	Inverurie Loco Works	Deveronside
1991–92	FC Stoneywood	Stonehaven	Lossiemouth United
1992–93	Inverurie Loco Works	FC Stoneywood	**Buckie Rovers**
1993–94	Stonehaven	Sunnybank	Deveronside
1994–95	FC Stoneywood	Turriff United	Lossiemouth United
1995–96	Inverurie Loco Works	Turriff United	Deveronside
1996–97	Sunnybank	FC Stoneywood	Islavale
1997–98	Inverurie Loco Works	Sunnybank	Islavale
1998–99	Sunnybank	FC Stoneywood	Islavale
1999–2000	Longside	Sunnybank	**Deveronside**
2000–01	Longside	Sunnybank	Deveronside

== List of winners ==
Club	Winner	Runner-up	First win	Last win
Banks O' Dee	11 (Note: Includes 1 season when the play-off with the North Section winners was lost.)	6	1968–69	1986–87
Sunnybank	6	8	1971–72	1998–99
FC Stoneywood	4	5	1984–85	1994–95
Deveronside	4 (Note: Refers to 4 seasons of winning the North section and then defeating the East winners in a play-off.) (Note: Won the North section 10 times overall.)	0	1985–86	1999–2000
Inverurie Loco Works	3	2	1992–93	1997–98
Stonehaven	2	3	1989–90	1993–94
Longside	2	0	1999–2000	2000–01
Parkvale	1	0	1973–74	
Aberdeen East End	1	1	1977–78	
Fraserburgh United	1	0	1979–80	
Buckie Rovers	1 (Note: Refers to 1 season of winning the North section and then defeating the East winners in a play-off.) (Note: Won the North section 4 times overall.)	0	1992–93	
Burghead Thistle	1	0	1973–74	
Rosslyn Sport	1	0	1979–80	
Bon Accord	1	0	1988–89	
Turriff United	0	4	N/A	
Lewis United	0	3	N/A	
Mugiemoss	0	1	N/A	
Islavale	0	0	N/A	
Nairn St Ninian	0	0	N/A	
Forres Thistle	0 (Note: Won the North section twice overall.)	0	N/A	
Lossiemouth United	0	0	N/A	
Bishopmill United	0 (Note: Won the North section once overall.)	0	N/A	
Caberfeidh Juniors	0	0	N/A	
Fochabers	0	0	N/A	
