= Whitehills F.C. =

Association football club in Scotland

- Full name: Whitehills Football Club
- Nickname: The Hills
- Founded: 1999; 27 years ago
- Ground: Bill Morrice Park, School Road, Whitehills, Aberdeenshire, Scotland
- Capacity: 1,000
- Coordinates: 57°40′32″N 2°34′27″W
- Chairman: The perennial Morgy
- Manager: Craig Stewart
- League: NoSFL Championship
- 2025–26: NoSFL Championship, 12th of 15
Home colours	Away colours

Whitehills Football Club (also known as The Hills) are a Scottish football club from the village of Whitehills, near Banff, Aberdeenshire. Members of the Scottish Junior Football Association North Region, they currently play in the NoSFL Championship.

In July 2022 the club took a year of abeyance but would return a year later to the junior level, competing in the 2023–24 SJFA North Championship.

== History ==
Founded in 1999 playing in local Welfare competitions, the club stepped up to the Junior grade the following season but have yet to win any honours at this level.

In September 2024, Strooper (former Manager for Deveronvale F.C.) became manager for Whitehills F.C., naming Ernie Milne as his assistant.

== Ground ==
The club's home has been Bill Morrice Park in the village of Whitehills. The park encompasses a pitch, small play park and a pavilion for both Whitehills F.C. and visiting away teams. Although there are no seating facilities, the ground has ample ground space to accommodate around 1,000 attendees.

== Club officials ==
=== Technical Staff ===
- Manager: Craig Stewart
- Assistant Manager: Ernie Milne
- Team Coach: Danny Simpson
- Goalkeeping Coach: Craig Young

=== Club Management ===
- Chairman: Hamish Duncan
