= Burghead Thistle F.C. =

Association football club in Moray, Scotland

Burghead Thistle
- Full name: Burghead Thistle Football Club
- Founded: 1902
- Ground: Forest Park; Burghead
- Coordinates: 57°41′37″N 3°28′17″W
- Manager: David MacDonald
- League: NoSFL Championship
- 2025–26: NoSFL Championship, 8th of 15
Home colours	Away colours

Burghead Thistle Football Club is a football team, based in Burghead, Moray. A member of the Scottish Junior Football Association, it plays in the Championship of the North of Scotland Football League. It was formed in 1902.
