= Hermes F.C. =

Association football club in Scotland

Hermes
- Full name: Hermes Junior Football Club
- Nickname: none
- Founded: 1968
- Ground: Lochside Park; Bridge of Don; Aberdeen
- Capacity: 2500
- Coordinates: 57°11′43″N 2°5′31″W
- Manager: Steven Watson
- League: NoSFL Premier League
- 2025–26: NoSFL Premier League, 4th of 16
Home colours	Away colours

Hermes Junior Football Club are a Scottish football club from Bridge of Don, an area of the city of Aberdeen. Founded in 1968 by pupils of Robert Gordon's College, the club initially played at amateur level before becoming members of the Scottish Junior Football Association in 1993. They currently play in the North of Scotland Football League and their home ground is Lochside Park.

The club are so named after a founder member saw an advert in a magazine for a Hermes 2000 typewriter.

The club finished as champions in 2011–12 season, winning the SJFA North Region Superleague title for the first time. Hermes set a new SJFA Superleague points record of 73 points during the championship winning season, the previous record being held by Formartine United. Hermes were undefeated at home and only lost one game all season. The top goalscorer for the season was Marek Madle.

== Honours ==
- SJFA North Superleague champions: 2011–12, 2014–15
  - Runners-up: 2015–16, 2017–18, 2022–23
- North East Division One winners: 1994–95
- North Regional Cup: 1997–98, 2003–04, 2014–15
- North Region Grill League Cup: 2003–04, 2014–15, 2024–25
- McLeman Cup: 2008–09
- Morrison Trophy: 1996–97
- Duthie Cup: 2014–15
