= Ellon United F.C. =

Association football club in Scotland

Ellon United
- Full name: Ellon United Football Club
- Founded: c. 1890
- Ground: The Meadows; Meadows Way; Ellon
- Coordinates: 57°21′55″N 2°3′13″W
- Chairman: Miller Mathieson
- Manager: Rhys Jones
- League: NoSFL Premier League
Home colours	Away colours

Ellon United Football Club is a Scottish football club from the town of Ellon, Aberdeenshire. Members of the Scottish Junior Football Association, they currently play in the North of Scotland Football League. Founded around 1890, the club had also played in local Amateur and Senior competitions before joining the SJFA in 1974. They are based in The Meadows Sports Centre in Ellon along with Ellon RFC and local football sides. Club colours are red and black.

== Honours ==
- North East Division One winners: 1983–84
- ATR Group Cup: 2007–08
- Morrison Trophy: 1977–78
- McLeman Cup: 1977–78
- North Region First Division (East): 2016–17
