= Stoneywood Parkvale F.C. =

Association football club in Scotland

Stoneywood Parkvale
- Full name: Stoneywood Parkvale Football Club
- Nickname: The Vale
- Founded: 2016
- Ground: STAUFF PARK; Stoneywood; Aberdeen
- Capacity: 1000
- Coordinates: 57°11′24″N 2°11′12″W
- Chairman: Raymond Collins
- Manager: Michael Fyfe
- League: NoSFL Championship
- 2025–26: NoSFL Championship, 11th of 15
Home colours	Away colours

Stoneywood Parkvale Football Club are a Scottish football club from the Stoneywood area of Aberdeen. Playing in the North of Scotland Football League, they were formed in 2016 following the amalgamation of F.C. Stoneywood and Parkvale. The mens team is managed by Michael Fyfe.

== History ==
=== F.C. Stoneywood ===
F.C. Stoneywood were formed in 1981 after a previous club Stoneywood Works F.C. (founded 1924), merged with a local side F.C. Woodacon, who had won the Scottish Juvenile Cup in 1980. They moved from their Polo Park ground to a new build facility at Market Street in 2014. In their final season, the club finished bottom of the 2015–16 North Superleague.

Stoneywood won the following honours during their 34 years of existence:

- North Regional Cup: 1991–92, 1994–95, 1998–99, 2009–10
- North East Premier Division winners: 1984–85, 1990–91, 1991–92, 1994–95
- North East Division One winners: 1981–82
- Archibald Cup: 1990–91, 1992–93, 1996–97, 2000–01
- McLeman Cup: 1982–83, 1983–84, 1993–94
- Duthie (Acorn Heating) Cup: 1981–82, 1986–87, 1997–98
- North East League Cup: 1985–86, 1990–91, 1994–95, 1997–98
- Aberdeen Cable TV Cup: 1990–91, 1993–94, 1995–96, 1997–98
- Morrison Trophy: 1987–88, 1990–91
- Jimmy Gibb Memorial Trophy: 1990–91, 1991–92, 1994–95

=== Parkvale F.C. ===
Founded in 1898, Parkvale's origins were in the Kittybrewster district of Aberdeen where the team played at Central Park. The club moved on to Linksfield Stadium which they shared with fellow Junior sides, Lewis United and Mugiemoss. With a planned redevelopment of this facility lessening the number of available pitches, Parkvale moved again in 1994 to Findon Park on the outskirts of Portlethen, seven miles south of Aberdeen. This ground was the original home of another Junior side Bon Accord, who moved to a purpose-built ground in Old Aberdeen, less than two miles from Parkvale's original Kittybrewster home (it later became home to Bridge of Don Thistle). To this day, the Parkvale F.C. Supporters Social Club is situated on King Street in Aberdeen city centre. In their final season, the club finished 6th in the 2015–16 North First Division (East).

Parkvale won the following honours in the game:

- North East Premier Division winners: 1973–74
- Aberdeen & District Junior League winners: 1908–09, 1950–51
- North East Division One winners: 1982–83
- North Region Division One winners: 2004–05
- North Region Division Two winners: 2010–11
- Archibald Cup: 1926–27, 1935–36
- Duthie (Acorn Heating) Cup: 1911–12, 1978–79
- McLeman Cup: 1920–21, 1964–65, 1973–74, 1979–80
- Morrison Trophy: 1972–73, 1973–74, 1976–77, 1982–83, 1983–84
- Aberdeen & District Junior League Cup: 1933–34
- Aberdeen County Trophy: 1910–11, 1911–12

=== Merger ===
The merger was announced in May 2016 with the new club playing out of Stoneywood's New Polo Park ground from the 2016–17 season onwards. The team have been managed until Jan 2026 by the former Lewis United manager Ian Davidson.

The club reached the last 16 of the 2019–20 Scottish Junior Cup.

=== Women’s Team ===
In September 2025, it was announced that a women’s team would be launched in time to compete in the 2025/2026 SWFL North Season. Cameron Hay, son of Brian Hay (a long time servant of the club) was appointed as the team’s first ever manager. Cameron had previously coached the men’s team during an interim spell in the 2023/2024 season while the club were in search of a new manager.
