= Stonehaven F.C. =

Association football club in Scotland

Stonehaven
- Full name: Stonehaven Football Club
- Nickname: The Hive
- Founded: 1919
- Ground: Glenury Park; Stonehaven
- Capacity: 2,000
- Coordinates: 56°58′16″N 2°12′53″W
- Chairman: Ken Scott
- Manager: Martyn Rollo
- League: NoSFL Premier League
- 2025–26: NoSFL Premier League, 1st of 16 (champions)
- Website: http://www.stonehavenfc.co.uk
Home colours

Stonehaven Football Club are a Scottish Junior football club from Stonehaven, Aberdeenshire. The club currently play in the McBookie.com North of Scotland Football League.

== History ==
Stonehaven Football Club were founded in 1919 and the clubs' home ground is Glenury Park. The Club colours are royal blue with white trim on the shirts and shorts, with a change kit of yellow and black vertical striped shirts with black shorts and black socks. The Club changed to these back in the late 1980s following the appointment of long-standing manager Derek Allan.

== 2009–2010 ==
At the end of the 2009–10 SJFA North Division One season, second placed Inverness City were denied promotion after failing to secure a suitable home ground. The decision was made for third placed Stonehaven to play-off against Buchanhaven Hearts who finished 13th in the North Superleague to decide the second promotion/relegation spot. Stonehaven won 3–2 at Heathryfold Park, Aberdeen to secure promotion.

== 2010–2011 ==
The Hive retained their Superleague status the following season under the guidance, for part of the season at least, of new management duo Richard Craig and Derek Craigie before they took over the reins at Superleague rivals Sunnybank. Former manager Derek Allan stepped into the breach in December 2011 with assistance from former Cove Rangers, Huntly and Peterhead midfielder Doug Baxter.

== 2011–2012 ==
Just a couple of months into the 2011–2012 season Baxter was handed sole charge of the side and along with assistant manager Sandy McNaughton led the side to second in the PMAC Superleague and to the McBookie.com McLeman Cup.

== 2012–2013 ==
Despite this success Baxter and McNaughton opted to move to pastures new in October 2012 and they took over at rivals Banks o'Dee.

It was Derek Allan who would fill the managerial position again, with assistance initially from former Banchory St Ternan manager Steve Scott and latterly Ian Esslemont. Due to work commitments Allan was to step down again in early 2013 but that did not deter Esslemont and the team as, despite a 7th place Superleague finish, they achieved yet more silverware success as they clinched the Domino's Pizza North Regional Cup with a 3–1 win over Maud at Ian Mair Park.

== 2013–2014 ==
The following season was one of transition, with seven of the previous season's squad leaving the club. Max Alexander, Sean Croll, Ross Forsyth, Keith Horne, Michael Smith and Ryan Stewart left for Banks o' Dee, and Callum Murray joined Hermes.

Danny Anderson, Tim Capstick, Kevin Davidson, Shaun Goate, Justin Knowles, Michael Mathieson, Grant Moorhouse, the Hive's first ever Lithuanian Valentinas Sulkevicius, and Graeme Wilson came in to replace those who departed, and despite two opening Superleague defeats the team were soon top of the table. Ultimately it was too much of an ask to stay in pole position, with an eventual second successive 7th-place finish.

== Club officials ==
=== Management ===
As of 28 August 2022

- Manager: Martyn Rollo
- Assistant Manager: Paul Mitchell
- Coach: Kris Petty
- U21's Manager: Daniel Middler
- Player/Coach: Ludi Metelski
- Goalkeeping Coach: Spud and Lee Thompson

=== Committee ===
As of 15 October 2016

- Chairman: Ken Scott
- Secretary: Neale Scott
- Treasurer: Chuck Thorn
- Graham Anderson
- Kenny Black
- Brian Birss

== Squad ==
As of 28 August 2022

Note: Flags indicate national team as defined under FIFA eligibility rules; some limited exceptions apply. Players may hold more than one non-FIFA nationality.

| No. | Pos. | Nation | Player |
|---|---|---|---|
| — | GK | SCO | Reece Duncan |
| — | GK | SCO | Lewis Leiper |
| — | DF | SCO | Clark Robertson |
| — | DF | SCO | Chris Jolly |
| — | DF | SCO | Ronan Masson |
| — | DF | SCO | Lee Taggart |
| — | DF | SCO | Cameron Cook |
| — | DF | SCO | Ludi Metelski |
| — | DF | SCO | Ross Mitchell |
| — | DF | SCO | Daniel Higgins |
| — | MF | SCO | Ryan Fenby |
| — | MF | SCO | Findlay Masson |
| — | MF | SCO | Derek Boylan |

| No. | Pos. | Nation | Player |
|---|---|---|---|
| — | MF | SCO | Lewis Kidd |
| — | MF | SCO | Cameron Beattie |
| — | MF | SCO | Reece Wilson |
| — | MF | SCO | Ian Gunn |
| — | MF | SCO | Danny Anderson |
| — | MF | SCO | Adam MacLennan |
| — | MF | SCO | Blair MacLennan |
| — | FW | SCO | Nicky Gordon |
| — | FW | SCO | Josh Christie |
| — | FW | SCO | Caie McDonald |
| — | FW | SCO | Keith Horne |
| — | FW | SCO | Wayne Barron |
| — | FW | SCO | David Baillie |

== Honours ==
- North of Scotland Football League Premier League winners: 2025–26
- SJFA North East Premier Division winners: 1989–90, 1993–94
- SJFA North Region First Division winners: 2021–22
- SJFA North East Division One winners: 1988–89
- Morrison Trophy: 1981–82, 1984–85, 2009–10, 2021–22
- North (Norsco) Regional Cup: 1990–91
- Duthie (Acorn Heating) Cup: 1963–64, 1968–69, 1993–94
- McLeman Cup: 1972–73, 1987–88, 1994–95, 2011–2012
- Aberdeen & District Junior League Cup: 1962–63, 1963–64
- Jimmy Gibb Memorial Trophy: 1989–90
- Domino's Pizza North Regional Cup: 2012–13
- Jim McPherson Trophy: 2026–27

== Notable former players ==
Note: Flags indicate national team as defined under FIFA eligibility rules; some limited exceptions apply. Players may hold more than one non-FIFA nationality.

| No. | Pos. | Nation | Player |
|---|---|---|---|
| — | DF | SCO | Jamie Buchan |

== Sources ==
- Scottish Football Historical Archive
- Non-league Scotland
