= Fraserburgh United F.C. =

Association football club in Scotland

Fraserburgh United
- Full name: Fraserburgh United Football Club
- Nickname: Broch United
- Founded: 1976
- Ground: College Park, Henderson Road, Fraserburgh
- Coordinates: 57°41′4″N 2°1′29″W
- Chairman: Gordon Laird
- Manager: Brent Bruce
- League: NoSFL Premier League
- 2025–26: NoSFL Championship, 1st of 15 (promoted)
Home colours	Away colours

Fraserburgh United Football Club is a Scottish football club from the town of Fraserburgh, Aberdeenshire. Members of the Scottish Junior Football Association, it currently plays in the North of Scotland Football League. Founded in 1976, United is the smaller of the local teams after Fraserburgh F.C. of the Highland League. Based at College Park, the Club colours are tangerine and black.

== Honours ==
- North of Scotland Football League Championship winners: 2025–26
- North East Premier League winners: 1979–80
- North Region Division One winners: 2009–10
- North East Division One winners: 1990–91
- Duthie (Acorn Heating) Cup: 1977–78
- Morrison Trophy: 1979–80, 2003–04, 2015–16
- Elginshire Cup: 2025–26

== Sources ==
- Non-league Scotland
- Scottish Football Historical Archive
