= Lewis United F.C. =

Association football club in Scotland

Lewis United
- Full name: Lewis United Junior Football Club
- Nickname(s): The Hoops, The Shipbuilders, “Little Aberdeen”
- Founded: 1942
- Dissolved: 2018
- Ground: Aberdeen Sports Village; Linksfield Road; Aberdeen
Home colours

Lewis United Junior Football Club was a Scottish football club from the city of Aberdeen. The club folded in May 2018 after seventy years as members of the Scottish Junior Football Association.

Founded in 1942 as a Juvenile side associated with the John Lewis & Sons shipbuilders in Aberdeen, United joined the semi-professional Junior ranks in 1947. The club were based at the Chris Anderson Stadium (formerly Linksfield Stadium) which was rebuilt between 2007 and 2009 as part of the Aberdeen Sports Village complex. For the 2007–08 season the club played all matches away from home and the following season, shared New Advocates Park with East End. Despite not having a home ground for these two seasons, the club were allowed to gain promotion to the North Superleague in 2008.

At the end of the 2017–18 season, in which they finished 10th out of 11 in the SJFA North First Division (East), the club announced they had folded due to a lack of committee members and sponsorship.

The Shipbuilders received several younger players on loan over the years from nearby Aberdeen F.C. to aid their development, including Alex McLeish, who went on to become Scotland's third most capped international player. Other Dons loanees at Lewis include Kevin Christie, Duncan Davidson, Willie Falconer, Hugh Robertson and Derek Young.

== Honours ==
- Aberdeen & District Junior League winners: 1963–64
- North East Division One winners: 1996–97
- Archibald Cup: 1966–67, 1971–72, 1973–74
- McLeman Cup: 1957–58, 1962–63, 1971–72, 1991–92
- Duthie (Acorn Heating) Cup: 1950–51, 1953–54, 1961–62, 1962–63, 1964–65, 1965–66, 1971–72
- North East League Cup: 1972–73, 1974–75, 1976–77
- Morrison Trophy: 1991–92, 1992–93, 2002–03
- North Drybrough Cup: 1974–75
- Aberdeen & District Junior League Cup: 1951–52
- Aberdeen County Trophy: 1951–52
