= Sunnybank F.C. =

Association football club in Scotland

Sunnybank
- Full name: Sunnybank Football Club
- Nicknames: The Black and Whites
- Founded: 1946
- Ground: Heathryfold Park; Heathryfold Circle; Aberdeen
- Coordinates: 57°10′20″N 2°9′20″W
- Manager: Ross Doig
- League: NoSFL Championship
- 2025–26: NoSFL Premier League, 15th of 16 (relegated)
Home colours	Away colours

Sunnybank Football Club are a Scottish football club, based in the city of Aberdeen. Members of the Scottish Junior Football Association, they currently play in the North of Scotland Football League.

In respect of honours won, the club are historically regarded as one of the "big two" of North Region Junior football along with city rivals Banks O' Dee, sharing the distinction of being the only North clubs to lift Junior football's national prize, the Scottish Junior Cup. The club are based at Heathryfold Park in the North-West suburbs of Aberdeen and their colours are black and white.

== History ==
Sunnybank FP were founded in 1936 and played in youth football until the onset of World War II. In 1946 the club merged with another local side Belmont, founded in 1944, and joined the Aberdeen & District Junior Football League as Sunnybank F.C.. The club won their first cup competitions in 1947–48, first league championship in 1951–52 and in 1953–54 won the Scottish Junior Cup, defeating Lochee Harp in front of 22,600 fans at Hampden Park, Glasgow, the first club from what would become the North Region to do so.

Since 1946 the club had played at Linksfield Stadium, near the centre of Aberdeen but in 1957 purchased the site of Heathryfold Park from Lord Hay of Seaton, a local landowner, for the sum of £360. Although at that time on the city outskirts, the ground was soon surrounded by new housing schemes such as Northfield. This enabled the club to operate a thriving social club although in the early 21st century, this has fallen on hard times.

As a result of winning the 2009–10 SJFA North Superleague, the club earned entry to the Scottish Cup for the first time in their history. On 1 September 2010, Sunnybank were drawn away to Gala Fairydean of the East of Scotland Football League. This tie was played on 25 September 2010 which they won. In the next round, they were drawn away to Albion Rovers of the Scottish Third Division, and caused a shock by winning 1–0. Their reward in the third round was a match away to Scottish Second Division side Ayr United. However, their run in the Scottish Cup was to come to an end as they were beaten 5–0.

Owing to the resignation of their management team and a lack of signed players, the club were on the verge of taking a year out in July 2011 with the intention of returning for the start of the 2012–13 season, however they continued after a deal was agreed to use the youth players of local rivals Banks O' Dee.

Just two seasons after winning the league, however, they were relegated to the North Division One after achieving just six points out of 26 games. Their only win was a 3–1 victory at Lewis United.

== Honours ==
Scottish Junior Cup

- Winners: 1953–54

=== Other honours ===
- North & Tayside Inter-Regional Cup: 2008–09, 2009–10
- North Region Superleague winners: 2002–03, 2009–10
- North East Premier Division winners: 1971–72, 1974–75, 1975–76, 1982–83, 1996–97, 1998–99
- North Region Championship winners: 2022–23
- Aberdeen & District Junior League winners: 1951–52, 1953–54, 1955–56, 1965–66, 1966–67
- North Premier Division (ATR Group) Cup: 2006–07
- North (Norsco) Regional Cup: 1993–94, 1996–97, 2001–02
- North Region Grill League Cup: 2001–02, 2007–08, 2009–10
- Archibald Cup: 1947–48, 1952–53, 1953–54, 1963–64, 1969–70, 1974–75, 1975–76, 1979–80, 1983–84, 1994–95, 1995–96, 1997–98
- McLeman Cup: 1948–49, 1952–53, 1953–54, 1956–57, 1961–62, 1963–64, 1966–67, 1974–75, 1975–76, 1995–96, 1996–97, 1997–98, 1999–00
- Duthie (Acorn Heating) Cup: 1984–85, 1989–90, 1994–95, 1998–99
- North East League Cup: 1975–76, 1978–79, 1980–81, 1981–82, 1992–93, 1993–94, 1996–97, 1999–00, 2000–01
- Morrison Trophy: 1971–72, 1980–81 2013–2014
- North Drybrough Cup: 1975–76, 1979–80, 1982–83
- Aberdeen & District Junior League Cup: 1948–49, 1949–50, 1953–54, 1954–55, 1961–62, 1965–66, 1966–67
- Aberdeen Cable TV Cup: 1991–92, 1992–93
- Aberdeen County Trophy: 1947–48, 1952–53, 1953–54, 1958–59
- Jimmy Gibb Memorial Trophy: 1982–83, 1996–97
- Martin & Johnson Trophy: 1975–76

== Sources ==
- Club Website
- Non-league Scotland
- Scottish Football Historical Archive
