= Maud F.C. =

Association football club in Scotland

Maud
- Full name: Maud Junior Football Club
- Founded: 1973
- Ground: Maud Pleasure Park; Maud, Aberdeenshire
- Coordinates: 57°31′16″N 2°8′13″W
- League: NoSFL Premier League
- 2025–26: NoSFL Premier League, 9th of 16
Home colours

Maud Football Club are a Scottish football club from the village of Maud, Aberdeenshire. Members of the Scottish Junior Football Association, they currently play in the North of Scotland Football League. The current club formed in 1973 as an Amateur side and joined the SJFA North Region in 1975. Their home ground is Maud Pleasure Park and the club colours are red. The club withdrew from the league at the beginning of the 2002–03 season after some heavy defeats but returned the following year, winning promotion at the first attempt.

The team is managed by Kevin Park.

Kevin Park signed a new contract for three years.

On 20 May 2021, Kevin Park left Maud F.C.

== Honours ==
- North Region Grill League Cup: 2011–12
- North Region Division One winners: 2003–04
