= Dyce F.C. =

Association football club in Scotland

Dyce FC
- Full name: Dyce Football Club
- Nicknames: The Blue and White Hoops
- Founded: 1989
- Ground: Ian Mair Park, Dyce Drive, Dyce
- Coordinates: 57°13′3″N 2°11′19″W
- League: NoSFL Premier League
- 2025–26: NoSFL Premier League, 8th of 16
Home colours

Dyce Football Club (formerly Dyce Juniors Football Club) are a Scottish football club from Dyce, a suburb of Aberdeen. Members of the Scottish Junior Football Association, they currently play in the North of Scotland Football League. The club are based at Ian Mair Park.

== History ==
Dyce Juniors were established in 1989 following the amalgamation of two existing sides, Mugiemoss F.C. (founded 1887) and Rosslyn Sport F.C. (founded 1923 as Rosemount). The merger was spurred by problems both clubs faced concerning their home grounds. The Linksfield Stadium facility in Aberdeen, which Mugiemoss shared with two other sides, Lewis United and Parkvale, was due to undergo redevelopment, reducing the number of pitches available. Rosslyn Sport were struggling to maintain their own Rosslyn Park ground in Dyce. With both sides wishing to retain their own name, a compromise of Dyce Juniors was chosen and the club set up at Rosslyn Park. Within one season, disagreements at committee level led to the resignation of the previous Rosslyn Sport officials, leaving the club as essentially Mugiemoss F.C. playing under the Dyce Juniors banner.

The Dyce club colours are blue and white hoops, but have retained the Mugiemoss tradition by using their black and white stripes as the change kit. The Rosslyn Park ground continued to prove troublesome, requiring new dressing rooms to be constructed and in 2000 the stadium was renamed Ian Mair Park in memory of a late club official.

== Honours ==
- North Regional Cup: 2007–08, 2008–09, 2025–26
- North Region Grill League Cup: 2008–09, 2015–16, 2017–18
- North Region Division One Champions: 2005–06
- Morrison Trophy: 2001–02
- Rosslyn Sport were runners-up in the North Junior Football League in 1987–88, and reached the semi-finals of the Scottish Junior Cup in 1964–65 as Rosemount.
