= Bridge of Don =

Suburb of Aberdeen, Scotland

Coordinates: 57.182700°N 2.100985°W

Bridge of Don: Scottish Gaelic: Drochaid Dheathain; Scots: Brig o' Don
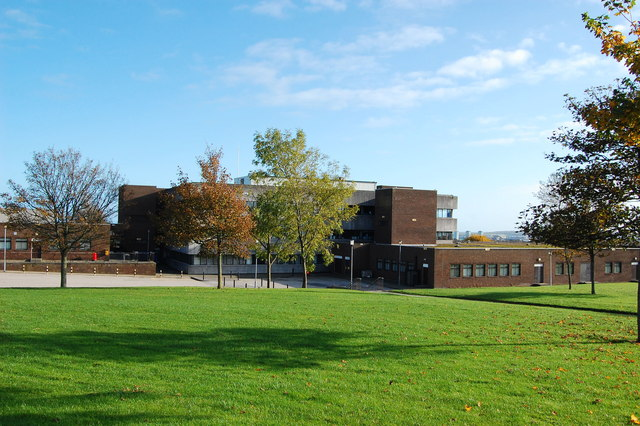

- Location within the Aberdeen City council area Location within Scotland
- Population: 19,636
- OS grid reference: NJ 93994 10213
- Council area: Aberdeen City
- Lieutenancy area: Aberdeen
- Country: Scotland
- Sovereign state: United Kingdom
- Post town: Aberdeen
- Postcode district: AB22, AB23
- Dialling code: 01224
- Police: Scotland
- Fire: Scottish
- Ambulance: Scottish
- UK Parliament: Aberdeen North
- Scottish Parliament: Aberdeen Donside

Bridge of Don is a suburb in the north of Aberdeen, Scotland. In 2020, the Bridge of Don electoral ward was estimated to have a population of 19,545.

Bridge of Don is split into four areas for statistical purposes by Aberdeen City Council and Police Scotland: Balgownie and Donmouth, Danestone, Denmore and Oldmachar. Traditionally Bridge of Don has been split up into: Bridge of Don, Danestone, Denmore and Middleton Park.

== Schools ==
The secondary schools within the suburb are: Bridge of Don Academy and Oldmachar Academy and there are also seven primary schools: Danestone, Braehead, Forehill, Glashieburn, Greenbrae, Middleton Park and Scotstown.

== Amenities ==
Bridge of Don has a library a community centre, and a retail park. It was formerly the site of the Aberdeen Exhibition and Conference Centre before this was relocated to Bucksburn as The Event Complex Aberdeen. The Royal Aberdeen Golf Club is situated in Bridge of Don on Links Road. At the mouth of the River Don, shared with Old Aberdeen is the Donmouth Local Nature Reserve.

== Sports ==
Bridge of Don is home to two Junior football clubs: Hall Russell United F.C. and Hermes F.C. who play at neighbouring grounds in the Denmore Road area.

== Military ==
The Gordon Barracks, which have served as the regimental headquarters for the Gordon Highlanders as well as being the training centre for the Highland Brigade are situated in Bridge of Don. The barracks consists of buildings around the a square and were opened in 1935 and were used as a barracks up to their closure as a centre for Junior Soldier training in 1986. The barracks are built of dressed blocks of granite. The central block is two storeys high, has three bays is a rectangular shape and has stepped gables with a roof of slates. The style of the buildings has been described as sub-baronial and the Royal arms are placed on the central block. The entrance to the barracks has cast-iron gates with decorations. Today, the Gordon Barracks are used by a number of organisations, including Territorial Army (TA) signals and medical units.
