= Banchory St Ternan F.C. =

Association football club in Scotland

Banchory St. Ternan
- Full name: Banchory St. Ternan Football Club
- Nickname: Saints
- Founded: 1992
- Ground: Milton Park; Crathes; Banchory
- Coordinates: 57°3′20″N 2°25′32″W
- Chairman: Graham Handsley
- Manager: Colin Shirreffs
- League: NoSFL Championship
- 2025–26: NoSFL Championship, 5th of 15
| Home colours | Away colours |

Banchory St. Ternan Football Club are a Scottish Junior football club based in Crathes, two miles outside the town of Banchory, Aberdeenshire. The club were formed in 1992 after an amalgamation of two local amateur teams, Banchory Amateurs and St. Ternan Amateurs, and joined the Scottish Junior Football Association, North Region in 1993. They currently play in the North of Scotland Football League. The club colours are royal blue and white.

The team are managed by Colin Shirreffs, who returned in 2025

== Honours ==
- North Region First Division winners: 2018–19
- North Region Division One winners: 2007–08
- Morrison Trophy winners: 1994–95, 1995–96, 2004–05, 2005–06, 2018–19
