= Deveronside F.C. =

Association football club in Scotland

Deveronside
- Full name: Deveronside Junior Football Club
- Nickname: The Side
- Founded: 1977
- Ground: Myrus Centre, Macduff
- Coordinates: 57°39′41″N 2°29′15″W
- Manager: Vacant
- League: NoSFL Championship
- 2025–26: NoSFL Championship, 4th of 15
Home colours	Away colours

Deveronside Junior Football Club are a Scottish football club from the town of Banff. Members of the Scottish Junior Football Association, they currently play in the NoSFL Championship. Founded in 1977, the club were based at Canal Park in Banff before relocating to the newly constructed Myrus Centre in Macduff in November 2016. The club were forced to take a season out in 2006–07 after failing to find a manager but returned the following year.

== Honours ==
- North & Tayside Inter-Regional Cup: 1988–89
- North Region (North) League: 1983–84, 1985–86, 1987–88, 1988–89, 1989–90, 1990–91, 1993–94, 1995–96, 1999–00, 2000–01
- North Region Second Division (Gordon Williamson) Trophy: 1978–79, 1984–85, 1985–86, 1986–87, 1987–88, 1995–96, 1996–97, 1997–98, 2000–01
- Morayshire Junior Cup: 1984–85, 1986–87, 1992–93, 1994–95
- Matthew Cup: 1983–84, 1984–85, 1987–88, 1990–91, 1992–93, 2000–01
- Nicholson Cup: 1983–84, 1988–89, 1989–90, 1992–93, 1993–94, 1994–95
- Clive Williamson Trophy: 2000–01
- Robbie Nicol Cup: 1986–87, 1987–88, 1993–94, 1999–00
- Robertson Cup: 1984–85, 1985–86, 1987–88, 1990–91, 1993–94, 1997–98, 2000–01
- Stewart Memorial Cup: 1983–84, 1986–87, 1988–89, 1989–90, 1992–93, 1993–94, 1994–95
- North Drybrough Cup: 1985–86
- Connon Cup: 1992–93
- Elginshire Cup: 2018–19, 2024–25
