= Hall Russell United F.C. =

Association football club in Scotland

Hall Russell United
- Full name: Hall Russell United Football Club
- Founded: 1968
- Ground: Denmore Park; Bridge of Don; Aberdeen
- Coordinates: 57°11′36″N 2°5′30″W
- Chairman: John Carroll
- Manager: Craig Carroll
- League: NoSFL Premier League
- 2025–26: NoSFL Championship, 2nd of 15 (promoted)

Hall Russell United Football Club are a Scottish football club based in Bridge of Don, a suburb of Aberdeen. Members of the Scottish Junior Football Association, they currently play in the North of Scotland Football League. Founded in 1968 as an Amateur club, the club joined the SJFA in 1989. Their home ground is Denmore Park and club colours are navy blue.

The club are related to a previous Junior side, Hall Russell's F.C.. This club, existing from 1915 to 1963, were a works team of the Hall Russell shipyard in Aberdeen. They reached the final of the Scottish Junior Cup in 1929–30, losing 3–0 to Newtongrange Star at Tynecastle Park in front of 17,000 spectators.

After the 2021–22 North Superleague ended, Hall Russell United went into abeyance. The club returned to Junior football in the 2023–2024 season, playing in the SJFA North Championship.

Since returning from abeyance Hall Russell United have been promoted back to the NOSFL Premier League after finishing 2nd in the NOSFL Championship 25/26. Furthermore, the club have established an Under-18s development side that play in the Highland League U18s; and an Under-21s side, that play in the ADFA Aberdeenshire League.

== Honours ==
- North Region Cup: 1992–93
- North East Division One winners: 1989–90
