= Longside F.C. =

Association football club in Scotland

Longside
- Full name: Longside Football Club
- Nickname: The Side
- Founded: 1933
- Ground: Davidson Park; Station Road; Longside, Aberdeenshire
- Coordinates: 57°31′4″N 1°56′16″W
- Manager: Nicol Davidson
- League: NoSFL Premier League
- 2025–26: NoSFL Premier League, 6th of 16
Home colours	Away colours

Longside Football Club is a Scottish football club from the village of Longside, seven miles west of Peterhead, Aberdeenshire. Members of the Scottish Junior Football Association, they currently play in the North of Scotland Football League. The earliest club records date back to 1933 when the club played in local Amateur competitions. They joined the Aberdeenshire Amateur FA in 1974 and stepped up to Junior football in 1989. The club are based at Davidson Park and team colours are red and black

== Honours ==
- North East Premier Division winners: 1999–00, 2000–01
- North East First Division winners: 1993–94
- Morrison Trophy: 1989–90, 1993–94, 2014–2015
- Aberdeen Cable TV Cup: 1994–95
- Jimmy Gibb Memorial Trophy: 1993–94, 1999–00
