= 2012–13 Scottish Junior Cup =

2012–13 Emirates Junior Cup
Tournament details
- Country: Scotland
- Teams: 163

Final positions
- Champions: Auchinleck Talbot
- Runners-up: Linlithgow Rose

Tournament statistics
- Top goal scorer(s): Steve Hislop (Bo'ness United); 10 goals

The 2012–13 Scottish Junior Cup was the 127th season of the Scottish Junior Cup, the national knockout tournament for member clubs of the Scottish Junior Football Association. The competition was sponsored by Emirates and is known as The Emirates Junior Cup for sponsorship purposes. The winner of this competition was eligible to enter the following season's Scottish Cup at the first round stage.

A total of 163 clubs entered, one fewer than the previous season. Dropping out were Stonehouse Violet, who had folded and Dufftown, who are in abeyance. Scone Thistle returned to the tournament after taking one season out of the game.

The five Junior clubs qualified for this season's Scottish Cup, were not included in the draw for the first round. These were the three Superleague champions: Bonnyrigg Rose Athletic (East), Hermes (North) and Irvine Meadow (West); the Scottish Junior Cup winners Shotts Bon Accord, and Girvan who qualify automatically as a full member of the Scottish Football Association.

== Calendar ==
The scheduled dates for each round of the 2012–13 tournament were as follows:

Round	Date	Matches	Clubs	New entries this round
First Round	22 September 2012	35	158 → 123	158
Second Round	20 October 2012	64	128 → 64	5
Third Round	17 November 2012	32	64 → 32	none
Fourth round	19 January 2013	16	32 → 16	none
Fifth round	16 February 2013	8	16 → 8	none
Quarter-finals	16 March 2013	4	8 → 4	none
Semifinals	13/14 & 20/21 April 2013	4	4 → 2	none
Final	2 June 2013	1	2 → 1	none

Drawn matches are replayed the following weekend. Replays ending in a draw proceed direct to penalty shootout. Semifinals are played home and away over two legs, subject to decision by the SJFA management committee.

== First round ==
The first round draw took place at the Scottish Football Museum, Hampden Park, Glasgow on 22 August 2012.

Home team	Score	Away team
Crossgates Primrose	0 – 5	Cumnock Juniors
Muirkirk	0 – 6	Yoker Athletic
Lesmahagow	0 – 1	Bellshill Athletic
Dunbar United	4 – 4	Penicuik Athletic
Port Glasgow	7 – 1	East End
Sunnybank	2 – 2	Lossiemouth United
Fochabers	4 – 9^{1}	Larkhall Thistle
Troon	0 – 4	Kilwinning Rangers
Bo'ness United	5 – 2	Whitletts Victoria
Colony Park	1 – 6	Fauldhouse United
Fraserburgh United	1 – 4	Lochgelly Albert
Arbroath Victoria	1 – 4	Kelty Hearts
Tayport	1 – 0	West Calder United
Broughty Athletic	0 – 3	Armadale Thistle
Harthill Royal	0 – 8	Whitburn
Cambuslang Rangers	0 – 6	Pollok
Kirkcaldy YM	2 – 6	Thorniewood United
Bishopmill United	2 – 7	Longside

Home team	Score	Away team
FC Stoneywood	4 – 2	Tranent Juniors
Glasgow Perthshire	0 – 2	Petershill
St. Roch's	0 – 6	Jeanfield Swifts
St Andrews United	3 – 2	Spartans
Vale of Clyde	0 – 2	Ashfield
Newmachar United	0 – 1	Lugar Boswell Thistle
Oakley United	7 – 3	Darvel
Blantyre Victoria	1 – 1	Lochee United
Renfrew	2 – 0	Lewis United
Burghead Thistle	2 – 0	Maybole
Buckie Rovers	3 – 0	New Elgin
Beith Juniors	8 – 0	Bankfoot Athletic
Newmains United	2 – 1^{2}	East Craigie
Craigmark Burntonians	1 – 3	St. Anthony's
Kello Rovers	1 – 7	Hill of Beath Hawthorn
Lochore Welfare	2 – 0	Newburgh
Bathgate Thistle	0 – 4	Clydebank

^{1} Tie played at New Elgin F.C.
^{2} Tie played at Ravenscraig Regional Sports Facility

=== Replays ===
Home team	Score	Away team
Lochee United	2 – 0	Blantyre Victoria
Lossiemouth United	3 – 1	Sunnybank
Penicuik Athletic	3 – 1	Dunbar United

== Second round ==
The second round draw took place at the Shotts Bon Accord Social Club, Shotts on 30 September 2012.

Home team	Score	Away team
Bo'ness United	11 – 1	Portgordon Victoria
Musselburgh Athletic	5 – 0	Bridge of Don Thistle
Glentanar	3 – 6	Blackburn United
Culter	4 – 0	Thornton Hibs
Kilsyth Rangers	2 – 1	Irvine Victoria
Whitburn	1 – 6	Newtongrange Star
Bonnyrigg Rose Athletic	4 – 1	Maud
Ellon United	1 – 2	East Kilbride Thistle
Steelend Victoria	3 – 0	Lossiemouth United
Kelty Hearts	4 – 0	Renfrew
Rossvale	0 – 2	Ardeer Thistle
Kirriemuir Thistle	4 – 2	Banks O' Dee
Edinburgh United	3 – 0	Scone Thistle
Carnoustie Panmure	0 – 2	Dundonald Bluebell
Blairgowrie	5 – 1	Nairn St. Ninian
Fauldhouse United	8 – 0	Lochee Harp
Lugar Boswell Thistle	1 – 3	Yoker Athletic
Inverness City	3 – 2^{3}	Downfield
Bellshill Athletic	2 – 0	Largs Thistle
Arthurlie	2 – 1	Broxburn Athletic
Hurlford United	1 – 3	Rutherglen Glencairn
Deveronside	3 – 1	Lochore Welfare
Girvan	0 – 3	Penicuik Athletic
Jeanfield Swifts	0 – 0	Port Glasgow
Ashfield	3 – 0	Arniston Rangers
Dundee Violet	5 – 3	Kilbirnie Ladeside
Dyce Juniors	1 – 0	Hill of Beath Hawthorn
Carluke Rovers	1 – 1	Kinnoull
Lanark United	0 – 3	Forth Wanderers
Lochgelly Albert	0 – 2	Johnstone Burgh
Ballingry Rovers	0 – 0	Sauchie Juniors
RAF Lossiemouth	0 – 13	Camelon Juniors

Home team	Score	Away team
Forfar West End	2 – 1	Buckie Rovers
Glenrothes	1 – 1	Benburb
Buchanhaven Hearts	2 – 1	FC Stoneywood
Ardrossan Winton Rovers	0 – 9	Linlithgow Rose
Lochee United	4 – 1	Kilwinning Rangers
Thorniewood United	4 – 1	Dundee North End
Royal Albert	2 – 4	Montrose Roselea
Glenafton Athletic	3 – 2	Clydebank
Shettleston	4 – 1	Cruden Bay
Greenock Juniors	6 – 1	Forres Thistle
Pumpherston	3 – 2	Whitehills
Falkirk Juniors	1 – 4	Hermes
Cumnock Juniors	5 – 0	Larkhall Thistle
Oakley United	3 – 1	Stonehaven
Dunipace Juniors	0 – 0	Livingston United
Brechin Victoria	1 – 2	Coupar Angus
Armadale Thistle	2 – 1	Hall Russell United
Longside	1 – 1	St. Anthony's
Vale of Leven	0 – 2	Irvine Meadow
Haddington Athletic	0 – 4	Shotts Bon Accord
Islavale	4 – 0	Luncarty
Tayport	1 – 0	Annbank United
Dalry Thistle	0 – 4	Cumbernauld United
Burghead Thistle	1 – 11	Kirkintilloch Rob Roy
Parkvale	1 – 2	St Andrews United
Forfar Albion	1 – 5	Saltcoats Victoria
Pollok	2 – 1	Neilston Juniors
Auchinleck Talbot	6 – 1	Dalkeith Thistle
Banchory St. Ternan	4 – 5	Rosyth
Stoneyburn	1 – 1	Maryhill
Petershill	3 – 0	Newmains United
Wishaw	1 – 4	Beith Juniors

^{3} Tie played at Nairn St. Ninian F.C.

=== Replays ===
Home team	Score	Away team
Port Glasgow	1 – 6	Jeanfield Swifts
Kinnoull	1 – 0	Carluke Rovers
Sauchie Juniors	2 – 1	Ballingry Rovers
St. Anthony's	3 – 1	Longside
Benburb	4 – 2	Glenrothes
Livingston United	2 – 1	Dunipace Juniors
Maryhill	1 – 0	Stoneyburn

== Third round ==
The third round draw took place at the offices of the Sun newspaper, Glasgow, on 6 November 2012.

Home team	Score	Away team
Armadale Thistle	2 – 5	Kirkintilloch Rob Roy
Rosyth	4 – 0	Brechin Victoria
Kelty Hearts	2 – 1^{4}	Penicuik Athletic
Benburb	4 – 2	Saltcoats Victoria
Camelon Juniors	3 – 3	Thorniewood United
Greenock Juniors	2 – 4	Shotts Bon Accord
Dundonald Bluebell	2 – 1	Oakley United
Cumnock Juniors	6 – 0	Islavale
Johnstone Burgh	7 – 1	Buchanhaven Hearts
Bonnyrigg Rose Athletic	3 – 6	Petershill
Beith Juniors	2 – 1	Sauchie Juniors
Montrose Roselea	3 – 1	Maryhill
Shettleston	3 – 1	Tayport
Dyce Juniors	1 – 6	Lochee United
Linlithgow Rose	3 – 1	Fauldhouse United
Glenafton Athletic	0 – 1	Pollok

Home team	Score	Away team
Pumpherston	4 – 3	Inverness City
Cumbernauld United	0 – 0	Forfar West End
Culter	7 – 2	Edinburgh United
Ashfield	0 – 1	Ardeer Thistle
Dundee Violet	5 – 0	Livingston United
St. Anthony's	1 – 4	Irvine Meadow
St Andrews United	0 – 3	Jeanfield Swifts
Musselburgh Athletic	4 – 0	Bellshill Athletic
Yoker Athletic	2 – 1	Forth Wanderers
Hermes	1 – 2	Bo'ness United
Newtongrange Star	0 – 1	Auchinleck Talbot
Steelend Victoria	1 – 6^{5}	Arthurlie
Deveronside	0 – 6	Rutherglen Glencairn
Kirriemuir Thistle	1 – 4	Kilsyth Rangers
East Kilbride Thistle	0 – 4^{6}	Kinnoull
Blackburn United	3 – 2	Blairgowrie

^{4} Tie played at Oakley United F.C.
^{5} Tie played at Arthurlie F.C.
^{6} Tie played at Kinnoull F.C.

=== Replays ===
Home team	Score	Away team
Thorniewood United	2 – 3^{7}	Camelon Juniors
Forfar West End	1 – 4^{8}	Cumbernauld United

^{7} Tie played at Ravenscraig Regional Sports Facility
^{8} Tie played at Forfar Athletic F.C.

== Fourth round ==
The fourth round draw took place at the offices of the Evening Times newspaper, Glasgow, on 27 November 2012.

Home team	Score	Away team
Blackburn United	0 – 1	Rutherglen Glencairn
Yoker Athletic	0 – 2	Camelon Juniors
Lochee United	1 – 0	Ardeer Thistle
Pollok	3 – 2	Beith Juniors
Irvine Meadow	2 – 2	Shettleston
Shotts Bon Accord	2 – 1	Benburb
Musselburgh Athletic	3 – 3	Pumpherston
Kelty Hearts	2 – 0	Cumbernauld United
Johnstone Burgh	0 – 2	Dundonald Bluebell
Auchinleck Talbot	7 – 0	Petershill
Arthurlie	2 – 4	Linlithgow Rose
Montrose Roselea	1 – 1	Jeanfield Swifts
Kinnoull	0 – 0	Kilsyth Rangers
Dundee Violet	1 – 1	Bo'ness United
Culter	4 – 5	Cumnock Juniors
Kirkintilloch Rob Roy	5 – 0	Rosyth

=== Replays ===
Home team	Score	Away team
Jeanfield Swifts	5 – 0	Montrose Roselea
Shettleston	0 – 1	Irvine Meadow
Pumpherston	3 – 0	Musselburgh Athletic
Kilsyth Rangers	4 – 1	Kinnoull
Bo'ness United	4 – 1	Dundee Violet

== Fifth round ==
The fifth round draw took place on the Clyde 1 football phone-in show, on 7 February 2013.

Home team	Score	Away team
Dundonald Bluebell	0 – 3	Camelon Juniors
Kirkintilloch Rob Roy	2 – 3	Bo'ness United
Lochee United	1 – 3	Auchinleck Talbot
Pollok	0 – 1	Shotts Bon Accord
Irvine Meadow	0 – 1	Cumnock Juniors
Rutherglen Glencairn	3 – 2	Pumpherston
Linlithgow Rose	3 – 1	Jeanfield Swifts
Kelty Hearts	2 – 0	Kilsyth Rangers

== Quarter-finals ==
The draw for the quarter-finals took place on the Central FM football phone-in show, on 26 February 2013.

Home team	Score	Away team
Linlithgow Rose	4 – 1	Bo'ness United
Rutherglen Glencairn	3 – 1	Camelon Juniors
Cumnock Juniors	3 – 5	Shotts Bon Accord
Kelty Hearts	0 – 4^{9}	Auchinleck Talbot

^{9} Tie played at Ballingry Rovers F.C.

== Semifinals ==
The draw for the semifinals took place at Mar Hall, Erskine on 24 March 2013, at a training base of the Scotland national football team.

=== First leg ===
13 April 2013
15:00

Auchinleck Talbot	1 – 1	Rutherglen Glencairn
Bryan Young 6'	Report	84' (pen.) Mark McCarry

Beechwood Park, Auchinleck
Referee: Colin Steven

13 April 2013
14:00

Linlithgow Rose	3 – 1	Shotts Bon Accord
Tommy Coyne 33', 42'; Ruari MacLennan 67'		34' Allan Mackenzie

Prestonfield, Linlithgow
Attendance: 1,425
Referee: Gavin Duncan

=== Second leg ===
20 April 2013
15:00

Rutherglen Glencairn	0 – 1 (aggregate 1 – 2)	Auchinleck Talbot
		8' (o.g.) Brian Welsh

Clyde Gateway Stadium, Rutherglen
Attendance: 1,155
Referee: Alan Newlands

20 April 2013
14:00

Shotts Bon Accord	1 – 1 (aggregate 2 – 4)	Linlithgow Rose
Hugh Kerr 82'		52' (pen.) Tommy Coyne

Hannah Park, Shotts
Attendance: 1,011
Referee: Gavin Ross

== Final ==
2 June 2013
16:05

Auchinleck Talbot	1 – 0	Linlithgow Rose
Gormley 76'	Report

Braidwood Motor Company Stadium, Livingston
Attendance: 6,492
Referee: Nick Walsh

1	Andy Leishman
2	Willie Lyle
3	Gordon Pope
4	Craig Pettigrew
5	Martin McGoldrick
6	Colin Spence	(substituted off) 71'
7	Bryan Young
8	Steven White
9	Graham Wilson	(substituted off) 71'
10	Keir Milliken	(substituted off) 90'
11	James Latta
Substitutes:
12	David Gormley	(substituted on) 71'
14	Michael McCann	(substituted on) 90'
15	Kyle Faulds	(substituted on) 71'
16	Gavin Collins
17	Brian McGarrity
Manager:
Tommy Sloan

1	David Hay
2	Billy Gibson
3	Adam Nelson
4	Jamie McKenzie
5	John Ovenstone
6	Ruari MacLennan
7	Stuart McArthur
8	Andy Shirra	(substituted off) 74'
9	Gordon Herd	(substituted off) 57'
10	Tommy Coyne
11	Roddy MacLennan	(substituted off) 85'
Substitutes:
12	Mark Tyrrell	(substituted on) 74'
14	Colin Strickland	(substituted on) 57'
15	Calum Smith	(substituted on) 85'
16	Stephen Manson
18	David Scott
Manager:
Mark Bradley
