= 2014–15 Scottish Junior Cup =

2014–15 Dyslexia Scotland Junior Cup
Tournament details
- Country: Scotland
- Teams: 161

Final positions
- Champions: Auchinleck Talbot
- Runners-up: Musselburgh Athletic

The 2014–15 Scottish Junior Cup was the 129th season of the Scottish Junior Cup, the national knockout tournament for member clubs of the Scottish Junior Football Association. The competition was partnered by the charity Dyslexia Scotland and is known as The Dyslexia Scotland Junior Cup. The winner of this competition entered the following season's Scottish Cup at the first round stage.

A total of 161 clubs entered the competition, one more than the previous season. Dropping out were Coupar Angus, Fochabers and Steelend Victoria, who were in abeyance. New members Aberdeen University, Grantown and Spey Valley made their debut in the competition while Lossiemouth United returned to the tournament after a period of abeyance.

The seven Junior clubs qualified for this season's Scottish Cup, were not included in the draw for the first round. These were the four reigning league and cup champions:

- Auchinleck Talbot - West of Scotland Super League Premier Division
- Bo'ness United - East Superleague
- Culter - North Superleague
- Hurlford United - Junior Cup holders

Also qualified automatically are Banks O'Dee and Linlithgow Rose who achieved national club licensing requirements and Girvan who qualified automatically as historic full members of the Scottish Football Association.

== Calendar ==
The provisional dates for each round of the 2014–15 tournament were as follows:

Round	Date	Matches	Clubs	New entries this round
First Round	27 September 2014	33	161 → 128	154
Second Round	25 October 2014	64	128 → 64	7
Third Round	22 November 2014	32	64 → 32	none
Fourth Round	17 January 2015	16	32 → 16	none
Fifth Round	14 February 2015	8	16 → 8	none
Quarter-finals	14 March 2015	4	8 → 4	none
Semi-finals	11/12 & 18/19 April 2015	4	4 → 2	none
Final	7 June 2015	1	2 → 1	none

Drawn matches are replayed the following weekend. Replays ending in a draw proceed direct to penalty shootout. Semi-finals are played home and away over two legs, subject to decision by the SJFA management committee.

== First round ==
The first round draw took place in the Pollok F.C. pavilion, Glasgow on 26 August 2014.

Home team	Score	Away team
Forth Wanderers	1 – 0	Dufftown
Ellon United	1 – 4	Carluke Rovers
Thornton Hibs	2 – 1	Ashfield
Oakley United	1 – 1	Jeanfield Swifts
Glentanar	0 – 7	Kelty Hearts
Wishaw Juniors	2 – 2	Sauchie Juniors
Aberdeen University	3 – 1	Kirkcaldy YM
Tranent Juniors	0 – 0	Edinburgh United
Kilsyth Rangers	4 – 1	Blairgowrie
Kilwinning Rangers	12 – 0	New Elgin
Whitehills	2 – 5	Lochee Harp
Harthill Royal	3 – 4	Darvel Juniors
Arthurlie	3 – 0	Hall Russell United
Annbank United	0 – 2	FC Stoneywood
Scone Thistle	0 – 5	Newtongrange Star
Bonnyrigg Rose Athletic	2 – 1	Inverness City
Sunnybank	1 – 4	Glenrothes

Home team	Score	Away team
Renfrew	1 – 2 ^{1}	Ballingry Rovers
Dundee North End	2 – 3	Kello Rovers
St. Roch's	5 – 2	Lochgelly Albert
East Kilbride Thistle	1 – 5	Johnstone Burgh
Falkirk Juniors	5 – 1 ^{2}	Islavale
Cruden Bay	2 – 2	Tayport
Downfield	2 – 0	Vale of Leven
East Craigie	1 – 0	Hill of Beath Hawthorn
Shettleston	2 – 1	Ardeer Thistle
St. Anthony's	3 – 3	Ardrossan Winton Rovers
Colony Park	0 – 0	Clydebank
Cambuslang Rangers	0 – 2	Irvine Meadow
Lanark United	1 – 3	Penicuik Athletic
Lochee United	4 – 1	Muirkirk Juniors
Parkvale	1 – 2	Rosyth
Hermes	2 – 1	Petershill

^{1} Match played at Johnstone Burgh F.C.
^{2} Match played at Falkirk F.C.

=== Replays ===
Home team	Score	Away team
Jeanfield Swifts	5 – 0	Oakley United
Sauchie Juniors	7 – 2	Wishaw Juniors
Edinburgh United	4 – 0	Tranent Juniors
Tayport	2 – 0	Cruden Bay
Ardrossan Winton Rovers	2 – 3	St. Anthony's
Clydebank	4 – 1	Colony Park

== Second round ==
The second round draw took place in the Irvine Meadow Social Club, Irvine on 5 October 2014.

Home team	Score	Away team
Livingston United	1 – 5	Shotts Bon Accord
Blackburn United	0 – 3	Musselburgh Athletic
Montrose Roselea	3 – 1	Irvine Victoria
Arthurlie	6 – 0	Dunbar United
Pumpherston Juniors	0 – 2	Kirkintilloch Rob Roy
Newmains United	3 – 10	Lochee United
Kennoway Star Hearts	5 – 0	Craigmark Burntonians
Haddington Athletic	0 – 5	Linlithgow Rose
Glenafton Athletic	1 – 0	Broxburn Athletic
Luncarty	7 – 0	Forfar Albion
Bathgate Thistle	1 – 6	Blantyre Victoria
Edinburgh United	7 – 0	Crossgates Primrose
Kello Rovers	1 – 8	Glenrothes
Grantown	2 – 5	Bellshill Athletic
West Calder United	0 – 0	Carnoustie Panmure
Clydebank	7 – 0	Lossiemouth United
Thorniewood United	6 – 1	Kirriemuir Thistle
Carluke Rovers	1 – 2	Troon
Greenock Juniors	0 – 4	Newtongrange Star
Largs Thistle	3 – 1	Sauchie Juniors
Dalry Thistle	1 – 2	Hermes
Buckie Rovers	0 – 3	St Andrews United
Armadale Thistle	2 – 2	Fauldhouse United
St. Anthony's	3 – 4	Dunipace Juniors
Larkhall Thistle	1 – 3	Darvel Juniors
Saltcoats Victoria	0 – 5	Maud
Rosyth	1 – 3	Hurlford United
Fraserburgh United	1 – 3	Rossvale
Whitburn	1 – 2 ^{3}	St. Roch's
Port Glasgow	6 – 0	Ballingry Rovers
Burghead Thistle	2 – 5	Lugar Boswell Thistle
Longside	2 – 4	Yoker Athletic

Home team	Score	Away team
Cumnock Juniors	3 – 1	Newmachar United
Aberdeen University	1 – 4	Dundonald Bluebell
Forfar West End	0 – 1	Kelty Hearts
Dundee Violet	1 – 0	Maryhill
Portgordon Victoria	1 – 6 ^{4}	Banchory St. Ternan
Beith Juniors	4 – 1	Cumbernauld United
Spey Valley	4 – 1	East End
Lesmahagow	6 – 0	Lochore Welfare
Kinnoull	1 – 6	Arbroath Victoria
Downfield	1 – 0	Lochee Harp
Glasgow Perthshire	1 – 2	Kilbirnie Ladeside
Girvan	0 – 3	Neilston Juniors
Tayport	2 – 4	Bonnyrigg Rose Athletic
Jeanfield Swifts	2 – 0	Bridge of Don Thistle
Arniston Rangers	2 – 0	Vale of Clyde
Culter	1 – 1	Rutherglen Glencairn
Penicuik Athletic	4 – 2	Maybole Juniors
Pollok	4 – 0	Whitletts Victoria
Royal Albert	1 – 3	Shettleston
Newburgh	0 – 4	Camelon Juniors
Nairn St. Ninian	1 – 0	Lewis United
Dyce Juniors	2 – 1	Forth Wanderers
Bo'ness United	10 – 0	Stoneyburn
FC Stoneywood	2 – 0 ^{5}	Deveronside
Dalkeith Thistle	1 – 2	Kilwinning Rangers
Forres Thistle	2 – 5	East Craigie
Broughty Athletic	2 – 1	Stonehaven
Irvine Meadow	2 – 1	Benburb
Falkirk Juniors	4 – 3 ^{6}	Buchanhaven Hearts
Banks O' Dee	0 – 6	Auchinleck Talbot
Thornton Hibs	1 – 3	Kilsyth Rangers
Johnstone Burgh	5 – 2	Brechin Victoria

^{3} Match played at Stoneyburn F.C.
^{4} Tie switched to Banchory St. Ternan F.C.
^{5} Tie switched to Deveronside F.C.
^{6} Match played at Camelon Juniors F.C.
.

=== Replays ===
Home team	Score	Away team
Carnoustie Panmure	0 – 3	West Calder United
Fauldhouse United	4 – 0	Armadale Thistle
Rutherglen Glencairn	2 – 3	Culter

== Third round ==
The third round draw took place in the offices of the Scottish Sun newspaper, Glasgow on 4 November 2014 at 12:30pm.

Home team	Score	Away team
Edinburgh United	1 – 5	Bonnyrigg Rose Athletic
Dyce Juniors	0 – 2	Port Glasgow
Lesmahagow	1 – 1	Jeanfield Swifts
Musselburgh Athletic	4 – 0	Luncarty
St Andrews United	6 – 2	St. Roch's
Shotts Bon Accord	1 – 6	Hurlford United
Arthurlie	6 – 2	Darvel Juniors
Beith Juniors	0 – 1	Kilwinning Rangers
FC Stoneywood	2 – 2 ^{7}	Kilbirnie Ladeside
West Calder United	0 – 3	Clydebank
Shettleston	1 – 0	Neilston Juniors
Rossvale	7 – 0	Lugar Boswell Thistle
Lochee United	1 – 3	Blantyre Victoria
Irvine Meadow	0 – 4	Auchinleck Talbot
Glenrothes	3 – 0	Hermes
Cumnock Juniors	1 – 0	Kennoway Star Hearts

Home team	Score	Away team
Nairn St. Ninian	1 – 3	Fauldhouse United
Camelon Juniors	4 – 1	East Craigie
Montrose Roselea	2 – 2	Linlithgow Rose
Troon	2 – 1	Arniston Rangers
Bellshill Athletic	3 – 1	Downfield
Dundee Violet	0 – 5	Pollok
Dundonald Bluebell	0 – 0	Yoker Athletic
Spey Valley	5 – 3	Banchory St. Ternan
Culter	2 – 2 ^{8}	Falkirk Juniors
Newtongrange Star	7 – 0	Maud
Penicuik Athletic	2 – 0	Arbroath Victoria
Johnstone Burgh	4 – 2	Largs Thistle
Dunipace Juniors	1 – 2	Kilsyth Rangers
Kirkintilloch Rob Roy	2 – 1	Glenafton Athletic
Kelty Hearts	1 – 2	Bo'ness United
Thorniewood United	1 – 3	Broughty Athletic

^{7} Match played at Longside F.C.
^{8} Match played at Montrose F.C.

=== Replays ===
Home team	Score	Away team
Jeanfield Swifts	1 – 4	Lesmahagow
Linlithgow Rose	6 – 0	Montrose Roselea
Yoker Athletic	3 – 2	Dundonald Bluebell
Kilbirnie Ladeside	4 – 0	FC Stoneywood
Falkirk Juniors	0 – 1	Culter

== Fourth round ==
The fourth round draw took place in the offices of the Evening Times newspaper, Glasgow on 2 December 2014.

Home team	Score	Away team
Arthurlie	1 – 1	Kirkintilloch Rob Roy
Spey Valley	0 – 7 ^{9}	Penicuik Athletic
Bonnyrigg Rose	4 – 1	Bellshill Athletic
Culter	2 – 3 ^{10}	Linlithgow Rose
Pollok	1 – 0	Cumnock Juniors
Clydebank	2 – 3	Shettleston
Port Glasgow	0 – 4	Auchinleck Talbot
Glenrothes	0 – 1	Yoker Athletic

Home team	Score	Away team
Newtongrange Star	2 – 2	Blantyre Victoria
Lesmahagow	4 – 0	Johnstone Burgh
Hurlford United	2 – 0	Bo'ness United
St Andrews United	2 – 0	Broughty Athletic
Kilbirnie Ladeside	4 – 2	Kilsyth Rangers
Rossvale	3 – 5	Musselburgh Athletic
Kilwinning Rangers	2 – 3	Fauldhouse United
Camelon Juniors	3 – 3	Troon

^{9} Tie switched to Penicuik Athletic F.C.
^{10} Match played at Banks O' Dee F.C.

=== Replays ===
Home team	Score	Away team
Kirkintilloch Rob Roy	1 – 1 (Arthurlie won 4-3 on Pens)	Arthurlie
Troon	1 – 2	Camelon Juniors
Blantyre Victoria	1 – 2	Newtongrange Star

== Fifth round ==
The fifth round draw took place on Peter and Roughie's Football Show on STV Glasgow on 4 February 2015.

Home team	Score	Away team
Auchinleck Talbot	1 – 1	Bonnyrigg Rose Athletic
St Andrews United	0 – 4	Pollok
Yoker Athletic	1 – 0	Lesmahagow
Kilbirnie Ladeside	0 – 2	Hurlford United
Linlithgow Rose	2 – 2	Camelon Juniors
Penicuik Athletic	2 – 1	Arthurlie
Shettleston	2 – 0	Newtongrange Star
Fauldhouse United	1 – 2	Musselburgh Athletic

=== Replays ===
Home team	Score	Away team
Bonnyrigg Rose Athletic	1 – 2	Auchinleck Talbot
Camelon	1 - 2	Linlithgow Rose

== Quarter-finals ==
The draw for the quarter-finals took place at Hampden Park, Glasgow on 27 February 2015.

Home team	Score	Away team
Shettleston	1 – 4	Auchinleck Talbot
Hurlford United	3 – 1	Pollok
Yoker Athletic	2 – 3	Linlithgow Rose
Musselburgh Athletic	2 – 0	Penicuik Athletic

== Semi-finals ==
The draw for the Semi Final of the Dyslexia Scottish Junior Cup took place at Mar Hall Bishopton on Friday 27 March 2015 and was carried out by Steven Naismith of Everton.

=== First leg ===
Home team	Score	Away team
Hurlford United	1 – 3	Auchinleck Talbot
Linlithgow Rose	2 – 3	Musselburgh Athletic

=== Second leg ===
Home team	Score	Away team
Auchinleck Talbot	2 - 1 (Auchinleck Talbot win 5-2 on aggregate)	Hurlford United
Musselburgh Athletic	2 - 2 (Musselburgh Athletic win 5-4 on aggregate)	Linlithgow Rose

== Final ==
The Final of the Dyslexia Scotland Junior Cup was played at Rugby Park, Kilmarnock on Sunday 7 June 2015 with a 4.05pm kick off. The game was televised live by BBC ALBA.

7 June 2015
16:05

Auchinleck Talbot	2 – 1	Musselburgh Athletic
Hislop 30'; Pope 60' (pen.)	BBC Sport	41' Sheerin

Rugby Park, Kilmarnock
Attendance: 5,186
Referee: Steven Kirkland

1	Andy Leishman
2	Willie Lyle
3	Gordon Pope
4	Martin McGoldrick
5	Mark Campbell
6	Willie Boyd	Substituted off
7	Bryan Young
8	Dwayne Hyslop
9	Keir Milliken
10	David Gormley
11	Graham Wilson	Substituted off
Substitutes:
12	Mark Shankland
14	Lee Cochrane
16	Colin Spence
17	Steven White	Substituted in
18	James Latta	Substituted in
Manager:
Tommy Sloan

1	Ally Adams
2	Alex Christie
3	Brian Martin
4	Jackie Myles	Substituted off
7	Lewis Turner
8	Darren Smith
9	Graeme Beveridge	Substituted off
10	Steven Thomson
11	Jordyn Sheerin
16	Robert Wilson
19	Andy Munro
Substitutes:
21	Murray Jackson
5	Gary Hamilton
6	Michael Hunter	Substituted in
14	Ewan Ralton
15	Jed Davie	Substituted in
Manager:
Stevie McLeish
