= 2011–12 Scottish Junior Cup =

2011–12 Emirates Junior Cup
Tournament details
- Country: Scotland
- Teams: 164

Final positions
- Champions: Shotts Bon Accord
- Runner-up: Auchinleck Talbot

Tournament statistics
- Top goal scorer(s): Paul Blackwood (Lochee United); 8 goals

The 2011–12 Scottish Junior Cup was the 126th season of the Scottish Junior Cup, the national knockout tournament for member clubs of the Scottish Junior Football Association. The competition is sponsored by Emirates and is known as The Emirates Junior Cup for sponsorship purposes.

164 clubs entered this season's tournament, an increase of two from 2010–11. The four new SJFA member clubs – Colony Park, Falkirk Juniors, Portgordon Victoria and Rossvale – made their first appearance. Missing from the previous season were Arbroath Sporting Club who had folded and Scone Thistle who were in abeyance.

Shotts Bon Accord won the trophy for the second time in their history, defeating cup holders Auchinleck Talbot, 2–1, in the final at Almondvale Stadium. Under a 2007 rule change, the Junior Cup winners (along with winners of the North, East and West regional leagues) qualify for the senior Scottish Cup; Shotts Bon Accord therefore competed in the 2012–13 Scottish Cup.

== Calendar ==
The scheduled dates for each round of the 2011–12 tournament were as follows: The decision to move the first leg of the semifinals back one day to Sunday 15 April was made in March 2012.

Round	Date	Matches	Clubs	New entries this round
First round	1 October 2011	36	164 → 128	72
Second round	29 October 2011	64	128 → 64	92
Third round	26 November 2011	32	64 → 32	none
Fourth round	21 January 2012	16	32 → 16	none
Fifth round	18 February 2012	8	16 → 8	none
Quarter-finals	17 March 2012	4	8 → 4	none
Semifinals	15 & 21 April 2012	4	4 → 2	none
Final	27 May 2012	1	2 → 1	none

Drawn matches are replayed the following weekend. Replays ending in a draw proceed direct to penalty shootout. Semifinals are played home and away over two legs.

== First round ==
The First round draw took place at Hampden Park, Glasgow on 30 August 2011.

Home team	Score	Away team
Yoker Athletic	6 – 0	Craigmark Burntonians
Dyce Juniors	2 – 5	Kirkintilloch Rob Roy
Lochee Harp	2 – 3	Ardeer Thistle
Port Glasgow	2 – 1	Harthill Royal
Cruden Bay	1 – 3	Armadale Thistle
Dundee North End	1 – 2	Hall Russell United
Penicuik Athletic	1 – 1	Glenrothes
Greenock Juniors	5 – 1	Fochabers
Shettleston	2 – 3	Dunbar United
Kello Rovers	5 – 0	Lossiemouth United
Saltcoats Victoria	4 – 1	East Kilbride Thistle
Largs Thistle	0 – 0	St. Anthony's
Maybole	7 – 0	Brechin Victoria
Oakley United	1 – 0	Rutherglen Glencairn
Islavale	1 – 3	Annbank United
Sauchie Juniors	1 – 0	Steelend Victoria
Arthurlie	5 – 0	Tranent
Lochee United	7 – 0	Luncarty

Home team	Score	Away team
Rosyth	4 – 2	Dundonald Bluebell
Kirriemuir Thistle	0 – 2	Kelty Hearts
Ardrossan Winton Rovers	2 – 1	Lochgelly Albert
Ellon United	3 – 0	Forres Thistle
Newtongrange Star	2 – 1	Longside
Hurlford United	1 – 2	Broxburn Athletic
Benburb	0 – 2	Cambuslang Rangers
Edinburgh United	0 – 8	Auchinleck Talbot
Colony Park	0 – 7	Neilston Juniors
Petershill	5 – 2	Maryhill
Bo'ness United	2 – 1	Linlithgow Rose
Jeanfield Swifts	8 – 5	East End
Wishaw	0 – 6	Dunipace Juniors
Forfar Albion	2 – 2	Nairn St. Ninian
Buchanhaven Hearts	1 – 5	Dalkeith Thistle
Deveronside	0 – 1^{1}	Whitletts Victoria
Banks O' Dee	1 – 6	Ashfield
Stoneyburn	1 – 1	Larkhall Thistle

^{1} Tie played at Deveronvale F.C.

=== Replays ===
Home team	Score	Away team
Glenrothes	0 – 3	Penicuik Athletic
St. Anthony's	2 – 4	Largs Thistle
Nairn St. Ninian	0 – 0 (5 – 3 pens)	Forfar Albion
Larkhall Thistle	5 – 2	Stoneyburn

== Second round ==
The Second round draw took place in the Pollok F.C. Social Club on 9 October 2011.

Home team	Score	Away team
Oakley United	5 – 3	Portgordon Victoria
Crossgates Primrose	1 – 0	Ardeer Thistle
Hermes	4 – 2	Stonehaven
Maud	0 – 2	Shotts Bon Accord
Thorniewood United	5 – 1	Newmachar United
St. Roch's	4 – 0	Bankfoot Athletic
Forth Wanderers	0 – 2	Camelon Juniors
Lesmahagow	5 – 1^{2}	Whitehills
Ardrossan Winton Rovers	1 – 2	Armadale Thistle
Dunbar United	1 – 4	Cumnock Juniors
Kelty Hearts	2 – 0	Culter
Fraserburgh United	3 – 2	Downfield
Kirkintilloch Rob Roy	0 – 2	Auchinleck Talbot
Burghead Thistle	1 – 2	Pollok
New Elgin	2 – 2	Kilwinning Rangers
Glasgow Perthshire	0 – 0	Penicuik Athletic
Maybole	3 – 1	Falkirk Juniors
Broxburn Athletic	6 – 0	Dalry Thistle
Dunipace Juniors	5 – 1	Royal Albert
Kilbirnie Ladeside	4 – 1	Livingston United
Blackburn United	2 – 2	Carnoustie Panmure
Troon	4 – 1	Lochore Welfare
St Andrews United	4 – 0	FC Stoneywood
Kinnoull	4 – 2	Irvine Victoria
Sunnybank	1 – 4	Irvine Meadow
Petershill	2 – 2	Ballingry Rovers
Renfrew	1 – 1	Sauchie Juniors
Whitburn	1 – 1	Newburgh
West Calder United	0 – 3	Neilston Juniors
Largs Thistle	2 – 0	Ellon United
Arthurlie	11 – 2	Bishopmill United
Blantyre Victoria	2 – 1	Jeanfield Swifts

Home team	Score	Away team
Newtongrange Star	0 – 0	Bonnyrigg Rose Athletic
Carluke Rovers	3 – 2	Vale of Clyde
Pumpherston	0 – 6	Lochee United
Inverness City	0 – 3	East Craigie
Musselburgh Athletic	2 – 1	Hill of Beath Hawthorn
Bellshill Athletic	4 – 1	Thornton Hibs
Whitletts Victoria	2 – 1	Dalkeith Thistle
Kello Rovers	0 – 1^{3}	Annbank United
RAF Lossiemouth	2 – 1	Dufftown
Dundee Violet	3 – 0	Hall Russell United
Larkhall Thistle	4 – 1	Muirkirk
Forfar West End	w/o^{4}	Girvan
Buckie Rovers	1 – 5	Broughty Athletic
Newmains United	0 – 5^{5}	Glenafton Athletic
Spartans	0 – 0	Glentanar
Cambuslang Rangers	4 – 2	Yoker Athletic
Kirkcaldy YM	7 – 0	Coupar Angus
Saltcoats Victoria	8 – 0^{6}	Darvel
Arniston Rangers	3 – 0	Banchory St. Ternan
Clydebank	9 – 2	Rossvale
Haddington Athletic	5 – 0	Johnstone Burgh
Lugar Boswell Thistle	1 – 2	Stonehouse Violet
Tayport	5 – 0	Arbroath Victoria
Bathgate Thistle	1 – 2	Ashfield
Fauldhouse United	6 – 1	Port Glasgow
Lanark United	2 – 0	Vale of Leven
Greenock Juniors	3 – 1	Parkvale
Beith Juniors	5 – 5	Cumbernauld United
Rosyth	2 – 3	Nairn St. Ninian
Bo'ness United	3 – 0	Lewis United
Kilsyth Rangers	6 – 0	Bridge of Don Thistle
Montrose Roselea	2 – 3	Blairgowrie

^{2} Tie switched to Whitehills F.C. after three postponements.
^{3} Tie played at Lugar Boswell Thistle F.C.
^{4} Forfar West End went into abeyance on 18 October 2011 and withdrew from all competitive matches.
^{5} Tie played at Glenafton Athletic F.C.
^{6} Tie switched to Darvel F.C. after three postponements.

=== Replays ===
Home team	Score	Away team
Kilwinning Rangers	3 – 1	New Elgin
Penicuik Athletic	4 – 1	Glasgow Perthshire
Carnoustie Panmure	2 – 2 (5 – 4 pens)	Blackburn United
Ballingry Rovers	2 – 2 (4 – 2 pens)	Petershill
Sauchie Juniors	0 – 0^{7} (5 – 4 pens)	Renfrew
Newburgh	2 – 5	Whitburn
Bonnyrigg Rose Athletic	2 – 1	Newtongrange Star
Glentanar	2 – 2 (5 – 4 pens)	Spartans
Cumbernauld United	0 – 1	Beith Juniors

^{7} Tie played at Alloa Athletic F.C.

== Third round ==
The Third round draw took place in the offices of the Scottish Sun newspaper, Glasgow on 15 November 2011.

Home team	Score	Away team
Broxburn Athletic	2 – 2	Girvan
Stonehouse Violet	1 – 2^{8}	Arniston Rangers
Maybole	4 – 1	Fauldhouse United
Cumnock Juniors	6 – 2	Kirkcaldy YM
Troon	2 – 2	Haddington Athletic
Lochee United	2 – 2	Tayport
Bo'ness United	2 – 0	Saltcoats Victoria
Cambuslang Rangers	2 - 0	East Craigie
Kilsyth Rangers	1 – 1	Armadale Thistle
Oakley United	0 – 2	Arthurlie
Ashfield	1 – 1	Whitletts Victoria
Thorniewood United	2 – 5^{9}	Larkhall Thistle
Kilwinning Rangers	3 – 1	Blantyre Victoria
Hermes	1 – 4	Glenafton Athletic
Dunipace Juniors	0 – 1	Irvine Meadow
St Andrews United	3 – 1	Carnoustie Panmure

Home team	Score	Away team
Sauchie Juniors	2 – 2^{10}	Neilston Juniors
Dundee Violet	3 – 0	Ballingry Rovers
Shotts Bon Accord	2 – 2^{11}	Annbank United
Camelon Juniors	0 – 0	Kelty Hearts
Whitburn	1 – 1^{12}	Glentanar
Bellshill Athletic	2 – 1^{13}	Greenock Juniors
Largs Thistle	3 – 0	Lesmahagow
Fraserburgh United	2 – 4	St. Roch's
Nairn St. Ninian	0 – 3	Lanark United
Blairgowrie	2 – 2	Pollok
Beith Juniors	2 – 3	Musselburgh Athletic
Kinnoull	1 – 0	Crossgates Primrose
Auchinleck Talbot	6 – 0	Penicuik Athletic
Bonnyrigg Rose Athletic	3 – 2	Clydebank
Carluke Rovers	2 – 1	Broughty Athletic
Kilbirnie Ladeside	w/o^{14}	RAF Lossiemouth

^{8} Tie played at Carluke Rovers F.C.
^{9} Tie played at Wishaw Sports Centre
^{10} Tie played at Alloa Athletic F.C.
^{11} Tie played at Petershill F.C.
^{12} Tie played at Broxburn Athletic F.C.
^{13} Tie played at Yoker Athletic F.C.
^{14} RAF Lossiemouth unable to fulfil re-arranged fixture due to festive leave and expelled from competition

=== Replays ===
Home team	Score	Away team
Girvan	4 – 3	Broxburn Athletic
Haddington Athletic	1 – 1 (3 – 4 pens)	Troon
Tayport	0 – 3	Lochee United
Armadale Thistle	0 – 2^{15}	Kilsyth Rangers
Whitletts Victoria	0 – 2	Ashfield
Neilston Juniors	0 – 1	Sauchie Juniors
Pollok	6 – 0	Blairgowrie
Kelty Hearts	1 – 0	Camelon Juniors
Annbank United	0 – 3^{16}	Shotts Bon Accord
Glentanar	1 – 2	Whitburn

^{15} Tie played at Broxburn Athletic F.C.
^{16} Tie played at Lugar Boswell Thistle F.C.

== Fourth round ==
The Fourth round draw took place in the offices of the Evening Times newspaper on 15 December 2011.

Home team	Score	Away team
Kelty Hearts	4 – 2	Whitburn
Kilwinning Rangers	1 – 0	Glenafton Athletic
Larkhall Thistle	2 – 1	Bellshill Athletic
Musselburgh Athletic	1 – 3	Auchinleck Talbot
Pollok	1 – 1	Lochee United
St Andrews United	1 – 1	Cumnock Juniors
Carluke Rovers	0 – 1	Irvine Meadow
Dundee Violet	0 – 1	Ashfield
Largs Thistle	1 – 1	Arniston Rangers
Kilsyth Rangers	1 – 3	Arthurlie
Sauchie Juniors	2 – 3	Bo'ness United
Cambuslang Rangers	1 – 2	Shotts Bon Accord
Kilbirnie Ladeside	3 – 1	Troon
Bonnyrigg Rose Athletic	3 – 2	Maybole
Girvan	2 – 4	St. Roch's
Lanark United	0 – 4	Kinnoull

=== Replays ===
Home team	Score	Away team
Lochee United	5 – 2	Pollok
Cumnock Juniors	2 – 4	St Andrews United
Arniston Rangers	1 – 1 (2 – 4 pens)	Largs Thistle

== Fifth round ==
The Fifth round draw took place live on Real Radio on Thursday 2 February 2012.

Home team	Score	Away team
Arthurlie	1 – 1	Bo'ness United
Ashfield	2 – 3	Bonnyrigg Rose Athletic
Auchinleck Talbot	5 – 0	St. Roch's
Kilwinning Rangers	2 – 2	Larkhall Thistle
St Andrews United	1 – 1	Kilbirnie Ladeside
Kinnoull	2 – 2	Shotts Bon Accord
Lochee United	0 – 3	Irvine Meadow
Largs Thistle	2 – 1	Kelty Hearts

=== Replays ===
Home team	Score	Away team
Bo'ness United	2 – 0	Arthurlie
Larkhall Thistle	1 – 2	Kilwinning Rangers
Kilbirnie Ladeside	0 – 2	St Andrews United
Shotts Bon Accord	4 – 1^{17}	Kinnoull

^{17} Tie played at Petershill F.C.

== Quarter-finals ==
The draw for the Quarter-finals took place live on Real Radio on Thursday 1 March 2012.

Home team	Score	Away team
St Andrews United	0 – 1	Shotts Bon Accord
Irvine Meadow	0 – 2	Bonnyrigg Rose Athletic
Largs Thistle	2 – 0	Kilwinning Rangers
Auchinleck Talbot	2 – 0	Bo'ness United

== Semifinals ==
The draw for the semifinals took place at Hampden Park on 28 March 2012.

=== First leg ===
15 April 2012
15:00

Bonnyrigg Rose Athletic	1 – 1	Auchinleck Talbot
Paul Shields 84'	Report	55' (pen.) Gordon Pope

New Dundas Park, Bonnyrigg
Attendance: 2,413
Referee: Andrew Dallas

15 April 2012
15:00

Shotts Bon Accord	1 – 1	Largs Thistle
Tony Fleming 81'	Report	43' Graham Black

Hannah Park, Shotts
Attendance: 944
Referee: Kevin Graham

=== Second leg ===
21 April 2012
15:00

Auchinleck Talbot	0 – 0 (agg. 1 – 1; 6 – 5 pens)	Bonnyrigg Rose Athletic
	Report

Beechwood Park, Auchinleck
Attendance: 1,674
Referee: Gavin Duncan

21 April 2012
15:00

Largs Thistle	0 – 0 (agg. 1 – 1; 2 – 4 pens)	Shotts Bon Accord
	Report

Barrfields Stadium, Largs
Attendance: 1,044
Referee: Colin Steven

== Final ==
27 May 2012
16:05

Auchinleck Talbot	1 – 2	Shotts Bon Accord
Faulds 88'		10' McCluskey; 14' Boyack

Braidwood Motor Company Stadium, Livingston
Attendance: 4,026
Referee: Don Robertson

1	Andy Leishman
2	Martin McGoldrick
3	Gordon Pope
4	Craig Pettigrew
5	Gavin Collins	(substituted off) 80'
6	Colin Spence	(substituted off) 70'
7	Bryan Young
8	Steven White
9	Keir Milliken
10	Kyle Faulds
11	James Latta	(substituted off) 87'
Substitutes:
12	Ally Park	(substituted in) 87'
14	Michael McCann	(substituted in) 80'
15	Bryan Slavin	(substituted in) 70'
16	Liam McVey
17	Ricky Robb
18	David Gillies
21	Brian McGarrity
Manager:
Tommy Sloan

1	Johnny Murdoch
2	Paul Finnigan
3	Paul Burns
4	Tony Fleming	(substituted off) 55'
5	Darren Ferguson
6	John Boyack	(substituted off) 69'
7	Andy Scott
8	Colin Williamson
9	Allan Mackenzie	(substituted off) 62'
10	Stefan McCluskey
11	Mark Sideserf
Substitutes:
12	Bryan Wharton	(substituted in) 55'
14	Gary McStay	(substituted in) 69'
15	Ryan Sullivan
16	Craig Miles
17	Brian Jack
18	Hugh Kerr	(substituted in) 62'
21	Craig Brown
Manager:
Tony McInally
