= 2010–11 Scottish Junior Cup =

2010–11 Emirates Junior Cup
Tournament details
- Country: Scotland
- Teams: 162

Final positions
- Champions: Auchinleck Talbot
- Runners-up: Musselburgh Athletic

Tournament statistics
- Top goal scorer(s): Richie Barr - Irvine Meadow; Alain Kinney - Kilbirnie Ladeside; Kenny McLean - Beith Juniors all 9 goals

The 2010–11 Scottish Junior Cup was the 125th season of the Scottish Junior Cup, the national knockout tournament for member clubs of the Scottish Junior Football Association. The competition is sponsored by Emirates and is known as The Emirates Junior Cup for sponsorship purposes. Auchinleck Talbot won the competition for a record ninth time, defeating Musselburgh Athletic 2–1 after extra-time.

Under a 2007 rule change, the Junior Cup winners (along with winners of the North, East and West regional leagues) qualify for the senior Scottish Cup; Auchinleck Talbot therefore competed in the 2011–12 Scottish Cup.

All 162 member clubs of the SJFA entered this season's tournament, a rise from 159 in season 2009–10. Newmachar United entered in their debut Junior season, Stonehouse Violet returned after one year in abeyance and RAF Lossiemouth were re-admitted after one season's suspension owing to an unfulfilled fixture in the 2008–09 competition.

The final of the competition was broadcast live on BBC ALBA.

== Calendar ==
Round	Date	Matches	Clubs	New entries this round
First Round	2 October 2010	34	162 → 128	68
Second Round	30 October 2010	64	128 → 64	94
Third Round	27 November 2010	32	64 → 32	none
Fourth Round	22 January 2011	16	32 → 16	none
Fifth Round	26 February 2011	8	16 → 8	none
Quarter-finals	19 March 2011	4	8 → 4	none
Semi-finals	16 & 23 April 2011	4	4 → 2	none
Final	29 May 2011	1	2 → 1	none

Drawn matches are replayed the following weekend. Replays ending in a draw proceed direct to penalty shootout.

== First round ==
The First Round draw took place at Hampden Park, Glasgow on 30 August 2010.

Home team	Score	Away team
Oakley United	1–2	Beith Juniors
Burghead Thistle	1–6	Vale of Leven
Bishopmill United	0–2^{1}	St Anthony's
Stoneywood	2–2	Cumbernauld United
Dundee North End	0–2	Vale of Clyde
Auchinleck Talbot	4–1	Kirkcaldy YM
Irvine Meadow	9–0	Buchanhaven Hearts
Sauchie	9–0	Nairn St Ninian
Spartans Juniors	3–3	Ballingry Rovers
Maybole	0–2	Shettleston
Lanark United	3–1	Inverness City
New Elgin	0–4	Port Glasgow

Home team	Score	Away team
Islavale	2–1	West Calder United
Hurlford United	4–1	Hillhead
Wishaw	1–4	Annbank United
Bo'ness United	1–0	Dundee Violet
Kelty Hearts	0–1	Glenrothes
Larkhall Thistle	3–0	Fauldhouse United
Blairgowrie	2–0	Maud
Whitburn	6–0	RAF Lossiemouth
Dundee East Craigie	2–1	Crossgates Primrose
Hall Russell United	0–6	Armadale Thistle
Steelend Victoria	1–3	Ardrossan Winton Rovers

Home team	Score	Away team
Blantyre Victoria	8–1	Irvine Victoria
Cumnock Juniors	1–1	Benburb
Parkvale	2–3	Lesmahagow
Ashfield	6–4	Carluke Rovers
Kilbirnie Ladeside	4–0	Newmachar United
Kilwinning Rangers	1–1	Penicuik Athletic
Buckie Rovers	0–2	Yoker Athletic
Largs Thistle	2–0	Royal Albert
Camelon Juniors	1–2	Pollok
Kirrie Thistle	1–2	Stoneyburn
East Kilbride Thistle	2–2	Kirkintilloch Rob Roy

^{1} Tie played at Elgin City F.C.

=== Replays ===
Home team	Score	Away team
Cumbernauld United	3–0	Stoneywood
Ballingry Rovers	0–0	Spartans Juniors
Ballingry Rovers win 4–2 on penalties

Home team	Score	Away team
Benburb	1–3	Cumnock Juniors
Penicuik Athletic	0–1	Kilwinning Rangers
Kirkintilloch Rob Roy	4–1	East Kilbride Thistle

== Second round ==
The Second Round draw took place in the Linlithgow Rose Social Club on 10 October 2010.

Home team	Score	Away team
Aberdeen East End	3–3	Bankfoot Athletic
Pollok	0–1	Neilston Juniors
Thorniewood United	2–3^{2}	Lochee Harp
St Anthony's	0–3	Shettleston
Longside	0–2	Ardrossan Winton Rovers
Kinnoull	2–2	Bo'ness United
Whitburn	3–6	Cumnock Juniors
Banchory St. Ternan	1–1	Newburgh
Dufftown	0–5	Haddington Athletic
Luncarty	0–3	Lochee United
Kello Rovers	3–5	Banks O' Dee
Dyce Juniors	0–0	Stoneyburn
Forth Wanderers	1–2	Greenock Juniors
Blairgowrie	4–0	Deveronside
Newtongrange Star	6–1	Fraserburgh United
Glenafton Athletic	1–4	Bellshill Athletic
Kilbirnie Ladeside	5–4	Newmains United
Larkhall Thistle	3–2	Annbank United
Yoker Athletic	1–1	Saltcoats Victoria
Lugar Boswell Thistle	0–0	Lochgelly Albert
Downfield	2–3	Rosyth
Port Glasgow	0–0	Troon

Home team	Score	Away team
Harthill Royal	0–9	Tayport
Livingston United	1–2	Hill of Beath Hawthorn
Whitehills	3–1	Fochabers
Dunipace	1–3	Lochore Welfare
Lanark United	2–1	Ballingry Rovers
Cruden Bay	0–8	Rutherglen Glencairn
Irvine Meadow	3–1	Bathgate Thistle
Blantyre Victoria	2–2^{3}	Ashfield
Bonnyrigg Rose Athletic	4–2	Johnstone Burgh
Dundee East Craigie	2–2	Stonehaven
Thornton Hibs	1–3	Kilsyth Rangers
Petershill	3–1	Dalkeith Thistle
Dundonald Bluebell	0–5	Auchinleck Talbot
Shotts Bon Accord	2–0	Lesmahagow
Jeanfield Swifts	1–4	Tranent
Broughty Athletic	2–0	Stonehouse Violet
Coupar Angus	1–4	Glasgow Perthshire
Edinburgh United	6–4	Girvan
Brechin Victoria	2–3	Dunbar United
Forres Thistle	0–6	Musselburgh Athletic
Carnoustie Panmure	1–2	Sauchie

Home team	Score	Away team
Forfar Albion	1–3	Culter
Maryhill	4–0	Glentanar
Renfrew	2–1	Largs Thistle
Lossiemouth United	1–4	Forfar West End
Arbroath Sporting Club	1–2	Kirkintilloch Rob Roy
Dalry Thistle	7–1	St Roch's
Arniston Rangers	0–3	Arthurlie
Vale of Clyde	1–0	Kilwinning Rangers
Craigmark Burntonians	4–9	Sunnybank
Cambuslang Rangers	3–0	Montrose Roselea
Linlithgow Rose	1–0	Clydebank
Beith Juniors	5–1	Hurlford United
Darvel	4–1	Hermes
Cumbernauld United	0–2	Vale of Leven
Blackburn United	1–2	Pumpherston
Glenrothes	2–1	Scone Thistle
Islavale	1–0	Lewis United
Arbroath Victoria	1–4	St Andrews United
Whitletts Victoria	5–0	Ellon United
Ardeer Thistle	1–2	Broxburn Athletic
Muirkirk	2–0^{4}	Armadale Thistle

^{2} Tie played at Bellshill Athletic F.C.
^{3} Tie played at Ashfield F.C.
^{4} Tie played at Lugar Boswell Thistle F.C.

=== Replays ===
Home team	Score	Away team
Bankfoot Athletic	4–0	Aberdeen East End
Bo'ness United	4–0	Kinnoull
Newburgh	0–2	Banchory St Ternan
Stoneyburn	3–2	Dyce
Ashfield	1–1	Blantyre Victoria
Blantyre Victoria win 4–3 on penalties

Home team	Score	Away team
Saltcoats Victoria	0–1	Yoker Athletic
Lochgelly Albert	3–3	Lugar Boswell Thistle
Lugar Boswell Thistle win 3–1 on penalties
Troon	0–4	Port Glasgow
Stonehaven	1–2	Dundee East Craigie

== Third round ==
The Third Round draw took place in the Evening Times newspaper offices, Glasgow, on 9 November 2010.

After nine weather-related postponements, the tie between Blantyre Victoria and Broughty Athletic finally went ahead at the Ravenscraig Regional Sports Facility in Motherwell, and became the first ever competitive match to be played indoors in Scotland.

Home team	Score	Away team
Tayport	0–0	Petershill
Lanark United	0–1	Whitletts Victoria
Maryhill	5–0	Muirkirk
Forfar West End	1–3	Hill of Beath Hawthorn
Stoneyburn	1–5	Musselburgh Athletic
Haddington Athletic	2–1	Rosyth
Lochore Welfare	0–3	Cumnock Juniors
Neilston Juniors	1–0	Vale of Clyde
Larkhall Thistle	1–2	Greenock Juniors
Edinburgh United	2–5	Arthurlie
St Andrews United	1–2	Ardrossan Winton Rovers
Sunnybank	2–1	Glasgow Perthshire
Sauchie	4–1	Cambuslang Rangers
Banchory St Ternan	0–2	Vale of Leven
Glenrothes	3–0	Tranent
Kirkintilloch Rob Roy	5–2	Banks O' Dee

Home team	Score	Away team
Blantyre Victoria	1–2^{5}	Broughty Athletic
Yoker Athletic	1–4	Bo'ness United
Shotts Bon Accord	0–1	Bellshill Athletic
Darvel	1–2	Kilsyth Rangers
Linlithgow Rose	2–2	Auchinleck Talbot
Shettleston	3–1	Port Glasgow
Newtongrange Star	1–1	Beith Juniors
Kilbirnie Ladeside	8–0	Blairgowrie
Dalry Thistle	2–1	Rutherglen Glencairn
Culter	0–0^{6}	Broxburn Athletic
Renfrew	2–2	Lochee United
Lochee Harp	0–1	Lugar Boswell Thistle
Irvine Meadow	9–0	Dundee East Craigie
Whitehills	1–2	Dunbar United
Bonnyrigg Rose Athletic	4–0	Pumpherston
Islavale	2–2^{7}	Bankfoot Athletic

^{5} Tie played at Ravenscraig Regional Sports Facility
^{6} Tie played at Montrose F.C.
^{7} Tie played at Buckie Rovers F.C.

=== Replays ===
Home team	Score	Away team
Lochee United	2–3	Renfrew
Bankfoot Athletic	2–2^{8}	Islavale
Bankfoot Athletic win 3–2 on penalties
Auchinleck Talbot	2–1	Linlithgow Rose
Beith Juniors	6–2	Newtongrange Star
Petershill	0–0	Tayport
Petershill win 5–4 on penalties
Broxburn Athletic	3–3	Culter
Culter win 4–3 on penalties

^{8} Tie played at Scone Thistle F.C.

== Fourth round ==
The Fourth Round draw took place at Hampden Park on 11 January 2011.

Home team	Score	Away team
Dalry Thistle	5–1	Neilston Juniors
Greenock Juniors	2–2	Beith Juniors
Lugar Boswell Thistle	2–3	Haddington Athletic
Glenrothes	2–1	Arthurlie
Cumnock Juniors	0–3	Auchinleck Talbot
Dunbar United	1–1	Petershill
Bonnyrigg Rose Athletic	4–0	Vale of Leven
Sunnybank	2–2	Sauchie
Ardrossan Winton Rovers	3–2	Culter
Bellshill Athletic	1–2	Bo'ness United
Broughty Athletic	0–4	Musselburgh Athletic
Kilsyth Rangers	1–3	Irvine Meadow
Maryhill	3–3	Shettleston
Whitletts Victoria	1–1	Kilbirnie Ladeside
Hill of Beath Hawthorn	1–1	Kirkintilloch Rob Roy
Renfrew	1–0	Bankfoot Athletic

=== Replays ===
Home team	Score	Away team
Sauchie	3–0^{9}	Sunnybank
Kilbirnie Ladeside	2–1	Whitletts Victoria
Beith Juniors	5–1	Greenock Juniors
Shettleston	2–0	Maryhill
Petershill	1–1	Dunbar United
Petershill win 5–3 on penalties
Kirkintilloch Rob Roy	2–1	Hill of Beath Hawthorn

^{9} Tie played at Alloa Athletic F.C.

== Fifth Round ==
The Fifth Round draw took place in the Scottish Sun newspaper offices on 15 February 2011. The date for the Fifth Round ties was also revised to 26 February 2011.

Home team	Score	Away team
Auchinleck Talbot	4–1	Sauchie
Petershill	0–1	Bo'ness United
Shettleston	0–4	Irvine Meadow
Kilbirnie Ladeside	3–3	Beith Juniors
Glenrothes	1–2	Kirkintilloch Rob Roy
Dalry Thistle	2–1	Haddington Athletic
Musselburgh Athletic	5–0	Renfrew
Ardrossan Winton Rovers	2–6	Bonnyrigg Rose Athletic

=== Replays ===
Home team	Score	Away team
Beith Juniors	0–1	Kilbirnie Ladeside

== Quarter-finals ==
The draw for the quarter-finals took place on Real Radio on Tuesday 8 March 2011.

Home team	Score	Away team
Bo'ness United	4–0	Bonnyrigg Rose Athletic
Dalry Thistle	3–1	Kirkintilloch Rob Roy
Irvine Meadow	1–3	Auchinleck Talbot
Musselburgh Athletic	2–0	Kilbirnie Ladeside

== Semi-finals ==
The draw for the semi-finals took place at Hampden Park on 31 March 2011.

=== First leg ===
16 April 2011
14:30

Musselburgh Athletic	1 – 0	Dalry Thistle
Chris King

Olivebank Stadium, Musselburgh
Referee: Kevin Graham

16 April 2011
14:30

Auchinleck Talbot	2 – 0	Bo'ness United
Bryan Young; David Gillies

Beechwood Park, Auchinleck
Referee: Barry Cook

=== Second leg ===
23 April 2011
14:30

Dalry Thistle	1 – 1 (aggregate 1 – 2)	Musselburgh Athletic
James Canning	Report	Scott Gibson

Merksworth Park, Dalry
Referee: Paul Robertson

23 April 2011
14:30

Bo'ness United	1 – 3 (aggregate 1 – 5)	Auchinleck Talbot
Grant Plenderleith	Report	James Latta; Gavin Collins; David Gillies

Newtown Park, Bo'ness
Referee: Don Robertson

== Final ==
29 May 2011
15:00

Auchinleck Talbot	2 – 1 (a.e.t.)	Musselburgh Athletic
Michael McCann 43'; Bryan Young 93'	Report	Chris King 76'

Rugby Park, Kilmarnock
Attendance: 6,025
Referee: Greg Aitken

GK	1	Andy Leishman
RM	2	James Latta	(substituted off) 71'
LB	3	Liam McVey
CB	4	Ricky Robb
CB	5	Gavin Collins
CM	6	Colin Spence	(substituted off) 84'
LM	7	Bryan Young
CM	8	Steven White
CF	9	Michael McCann	(substituted off) 107'
CF	10	John Boyle
RB	11	Bryan Slavin
Substitutes:
CF	12	David Gillies	(substituted in) 71'
CM	14	Kenny Connolly	(substituted in) 84'
	15	Stuart Davidson
CF	16	Stevie Mallan	(substituted in) 107'
	17	John O'Neill
	18	Martin McGoldrick
	19	Graham Smith
Manager:
Tommy Sloan

GK	1	Kieron Renton
RB	2	Chris Gordon
LB	3	Alan Morgan
CB	4	Scott Gibson
CB	5	Guy Kerr
CM	6	Calvin Shand	(substituted off) 108'
RM	7	Graeme Beveridge
CM	8	Chris King
CF	9	Kris Renton
CF	10	Matti King	(substituted off) 117'
LM	11	Paul Tansey	(substituted off) 64'
Substitutes:
MF	12	Brian Murray	(substituted in) 64'
MF	14	Ollie Russell	(substituted in) 108'
	15	Jerry Draper
MF	16	Andy Porteous	(substituted in) 117'
	17	Iain Ramage
	18	Wes Mitchell
	19	Ally Adams
Manager:
David McGlynn
