= 2013–14 Scottish Junior Cup =

Tournament details
- Country: Scotland
- Teams: 160

Final positions
- Champions: Hurlford United
- Runners-up: Glenafton Athletic

The 2013–14 Scottish Junior Cup was the 128th season of the Scottish Junior Cup, the national knockout tournament for member clubs of the Scottish Junior Football Association. The winner of this competition is eligible to enter the following season's Scottish Cup at the first round stage.

A total of 160 clubs entered, three fewer than the previous season. Dropping out were Bankfoot Athletic, Bishopmill United and Lossiemouth United, who were in abeyance, RAF Lossiemouth, who were playing in welfare football, and Spartans, who had transferred their Junior side to the East of Scotland League. New member Kennoway Star Hearts made their debut in the competition, while Dufftown returned to the tournament after a period of abeyance.

The four Junior clubs qualified for this season's Scottish Cup, were not included in the draw for the first round. These were the East Superleague champions Linlithgow Rose, North Superleague champions Culter, West Super League champions and reigning Junior Cup holders Auchinleck Talbot and Girvan who qualify automatically as a full member of the Scottish Football Association.

== Calendar ==
The scheduled dates for each round of the 2013–14 tournament are as follows:

| Round | Date | Matches | Clubs | New entries this round |
|---|---|---|---|---|
| First Round | 28 September 2013 | 32 | 160 → 128 | 156 |
| Second Round | 26 October 2013 | 64 | 128 → 64 | 4 |
| Third Round | 23 November 2013 | 32 | 64 → 32 | none |
| Fourth round | 18 January 2014 | 16 | 32 → 16 | none |
| Fifth round | 15 February 2014 | 8 | 16 → 8 | none |
| Quarter-finals | 15 March 2014 | 4 | 8 → 4 | none |
| Semi-finals | 12/13 & 19/20 April 2014 | 4 | 4 → 2 | none |
| Final | 1 June 2014 | 1 | 2 → 1 | none |

Drawn matches are replayed the following weekend. Replays ending in a draw proceed direct to penalty shootout. Semi-finals are played home and away over two legs, subject to decision by the SJFA management committee.

== First round ==
The first round draw took place at the Scottish Football Museum, Hampden Park, Glasgow on 3 September 2013.

| Home team | Score | Away team |
|---|---|---|
| Carnoustie Panmure | 3 – 1 | Edinburgh United |
| Glenrothes | 0 – 2 | Livingston United |
| Lochgelly Albert | 3 – 1 | Kelty Hearts |
| West Calder United | 0 – 4 | Sauchie Juniors |
| Dundee North End | 3 – 0 | Ardeer Thistle |
| Irvine Meadow | 2 – 1 | Scone Thistle |
| Royal Albert | 4 – 0 | Stoneyburn |
| Kirkcaldy YM | 3 – 3 | Falkirk Juniors |
| Dundee Violet | 0 – 1 | St Andrews United |
| Maryhill | 2 – 2 | Dyce Juniors |
| Cruden Bay | 2 – 2 | Glasgow Perthshire |
| East Craigie | 2 – 3 | Wishaw Juniors |
| Musselburgh Athletic | 6 – 3 | Arniston Rangers |
| Blairgowrie | 0 – 2 | Deveronside |
| Crossgates Primrose | 1 – 2 | Vale of Clyde |
| Dunbar United | 5 – 1 | Muirkirk Juniors |

| Home team | Score | Away team |
|---|---|---|
| Pollok | 4 – 1 | Luncarty |
| Glenafton Athletic | 9 – 1 | Inverness City |
| Vale of Leven | 1 – 1 | Thornton Hibs |
| Blackburn United | 1 – 2 | Largs Thistle |
| Jeanfield Swifts | 1 – 3 | Yoker Athletic |
| Islavale | 1 – 1 | Tranent Juniors |
| Kinnoull | 1 – 3 | Tayport |
| Arthurlie | 3 – 0 | Bridge of Don Thistle |
| Annbank United | 3 – 1 | Kello Rovers |
| Irvine Victoria | 1 – 2 | Greenock Juniors |
| Newmains United | 0 – 4 | Cambuslang Rangers |
| Forth Wanderers | 6 – 0 | Coupar Angus |
| Bonnyrigg Rose Athletic | 2 – 2 | Bo'ness United |
| Fochabers | 0 – 11 ^{1} | Kirriemuir Thistle |
| Neilston Juniors | 2 – 0 | Port Glasgow |
| Saltcoats Victoria | 1 – 2 | Blantyre Victoria |

^{1} Match played at Pinefield, Elgin.

=== Replays ===
| Home team | Score | Away team |
|---|---|---|
| Falkirk Juniors | 3 – 3 (6 – 7 pens) | Kirkcaldy YM |
| Dyce Juniors | 1 – 2 | Maryhill |
| Glasgow Perthshire | 1 – 2 | Cruden Bay |
| Thornton Hibs | 0 – 2 | Vale of Leven |
| Tranent Juniors | 4 – 0 | Islavale |
| Bo'ness United | 1 – 0 | Bonnyrigg Rose Athletic |

== Second round ==
The second round draw took place in the Auchinleck Talbot Social Club, Auchinleck on 9 October 2013. Girvan received a bye after Steelend Victoria went into abeyance prior to the draw.

| Home team | Score | Away team |
|---|---|---|
| Dunipace Juniors | 2 – 4 | Dunbar United |
| Kilbirnie Ladeside | 3 – 0 | Newburgh |
| Benburb | 7 – 0 | Lochgelly Albert |
| Lewis United | 0 – 2 | Colony Park |
| Haddington Athletic | 1 – 1 | Newtongrange Star |
| St. Roch's | 3 – 5 | Thorniewood United |
| Tayport | 4 – 2 | Renfrew |
| St Andrews United | 17 – 1 | Whitehills |
| Hall Russell United | 2 – 5 | Cruden Bay |
| Whitletts Victoria | 3 – 1 | Bathgate Thistle |
| Maryhill | 1 – 1 | Carnoustie Panmure |
| Forfar Albion | 0 – 6 | Lanark United |
| Johnstone Burgh | 0 – 2 | Hill of Beath Hawthorn |
| Sauchie Juniors | 4 – 0 | Tranent Juniors |
| Carluke Rovers | 1 – 1 | Linlithgow Rose |
| Musselburgh Athletic | 3 – 0 | Armadale Thistle |
| Livingston United | 4 – 0 | Vale of Clyde |
| Dundee North End | 1 – 2 | Bo'ness United |
| Cumnock Juniors | 1 – 0 | Troon |
| Rossvale | 3 – 6 | Dundonald Bluebell |
| Rosyth | 0 – 6 | Lochee United |
| Culter | 2 – 3 | Ashfield |
| Penicuik Athletic | 9 – 0 | Sunnybank |
| Auchinleck Talbot | 7 – 0 | Broxburn Athletic |
| Fraserburgh United | 3 – 5 | Ballingry Rovers |
| Arbroath Victoria | 1 – 2 | Beith Juniors |
| Kilsyth Rangers | 5 – 1 | Shettleston |
| Blantyre Victoria | 3 – 2 | Broughty Athletic |
| FC Stoneywood | 1 – 4 | Shotts Bon Accord |
| Neilston Juniors | 2 – 1 | Maud |
| Glentanar | 2 – 4 | Fauldhouse United |
| Buchanhaven Hearts | 2 – 6 | Banks O'Dee |

| Home team | Score | Away team |
|---|---|---|
| East Kilbride Thistle | 1 – 1 | Montrose Roselea |
| Kirkcaldy YM | 5 – 1 | Longside |
| Burghead Thistle | 1 – 1 | Parkvale |
| Lochore Welfare | 3 – 1 | Ellon United |
| Downfield | 0 – 3 | Arthurlie |
| Largs Thistle | 2 – 1 | Oakley United |
| Hermes | 9 – 0 | Newmachar United |
| Banchory St. Ternan | 6 – 1 | Pumpherston Juniors |
| Cambuslang Rangers | 7 – 1 | Portgordon Victoria |
| Bellshill Athletic | 0 – 3 | Deveronside |
| Lugar Boswell Thistle | 0 – 2 | Glenafton Athletic |
| Whitburn | 0 – 2 | Forth Wanderers |
| Harthill Royal | 7 – 0 | Craigmark Burntonians |
| Dufftown | 1 – 5 | Pollok |
| Lochee Harp | 1 – 7 | Kirkintilloch Rob Roy |
| Lesmahagow Juniors | 2 – 4 ^{2} | Camelon Juniors |
| Hurlford United | 8 – 0 | New Elgin |
| Kilwinning Rangers | 12 – 0 | Nairn St. Ninian |
| Irvine Meadow | 3 – 2 | Clydebank |
| Dalkeith Thistle | 6 – 1 | Vale of Leven |
| Yoker Athletic | 4 – 2 | Ardrossan Winton Rovers |
| Stonehaven | 3 – 1 | Forfar West End |
| Maybole | 0 – 0 | Cumbernauld United |
| Rutherglen Glencairn | 7 – 1 | Annbank United |
| Greenock Juniors | 1 – 2 | Royal Albert |
| Dalry Thistle | 9 – 1 | Buckie Rovers |
| Larkhall Thistle | 7 – 3 | Kirriemuir Thistle |
| Brechin Victoria | 1 – 2 | East End |
| Forres Thistle | 2 – 4 | Kennoway Star Hearts |
| Darvel Juniors | 2 – 2 | Wishaw Juniors |
| St. Anthony's | 3 – 3 | Petershill |

^{2} Tie switched to Camelon after three postponements.

=== Replays ===
| Home team | Score | Away team |
|---|---|---|
| Newtongrange Star | 1 – 1 (4 – 3 pens) | Haddington Athletic |
| Carnoustie Panmure | 3 – 2 | Maryhill |
| Linlithgow Rose | 5 – 1 | Carluke Rovers |
| Parkvale | 0 – 2 | Burghead Thistle |
| Cumbernauld United | 2 – 1 | Maybole |
| Wishaw Juniors | 2 – 3 | Darvel Juniors |
| Petershill | 3 – 0 | St Anthony's |
| Montrose Roselea | 0 – 0 (3 – 1 pens) | East Kilbride Thistle |

== Third round ==
The third round draw took place at the offices of The Scottish Sun newspaper, Glasgow on 4 November 2013.

| Home team | Score | Away team |
|---|---|---|
| Ashfield | 4 – 4 | Girvan |
| Kirkcaldy YM | 2 – 6 | Kilsyth Rangers |
| Dunbar United | 3 – 2 | Arthurlie |
| Yoker Athletic | 2 – 0 | Lanark United |
| Newtongrange Star | 1 – 5 | Tayport |
| Banks O' Dee | 1 – 2 | Larkhall Thistle |
| Lochore Welfare | 1 – 5 | Pollok |
| Benburb | 1 – 0 | Blantyre Victoria |
| Forth Wanderers | 1 – 1 | Hurlford United |
| Carnoustie Panmure | 6 – 0 | Colony Park |
| Banchory St. Ternan | 1 – 6 | Whitletts Victoria |
| Neilston Juniors | 2 – 0 | Stonehaven |
| Deveronside | 3 – 3 | Musselburgh Athletic |
| Bo'ness United | 1 – 0 | Auchinleck Talbot |
| Cumbernauld United | 4 – 0 | Cruden Bay |
| Largs Thistle | 2 – 1 | Kilbirnie Ladeside |

| Home team | Score | Away team |
|---|---|---|
| Kilwinning Rangers | 4 – 2 | Hermes |
| Kirkintilloch Rob Roy | 2 – 3 | Cumnock Juniors |
| Darvel Juniors | 1 – 2 | Rutherglen Glencairn |
| Montrose Roselea | 2 – 2 | East End |
| Irvine Meadow | 3 – 0 | Fauldhouse United |
| Linlithgow Rose | 1 – 2 | Shotts Bon Accord |
| Dalkeith Thistle | 1 – 4 | Hill of Beath Hawthorn |
| Camelon Juniors | 4 – 1 | Lochee United |
| Cambuslang Rangers | 2 – 1 | Kennoway Star Hearts |
| Livingston United | 1 – 3 | Penicuik Athletic |
| Dundonald Bluebell | 4 – 0 | Harthill Royal |
| Glenafton Athletic | 2 – 2 | Royal Albert |
| Petershill | 1 – 0 | Ballingry Rovers |
| Beith Juniors | 1 – 2 | Sauchie Juniors |
| St Andrews United | 2 – 0 | Thorniewood United |
| Dalry Thistle | 4 – 2 | Burghead Thistle |

=== Replays ===
| Home team | Score | Away team |
|---|---|---|
| Girvan | 4 – 3 | Ashfield |
| Hurlford United | 4 – 0 | Forth Wanderers |
| Musselburgh Athletic | 3 – 1 | Deveronside |
| East End | 0 – 2 | Montrose Roselea |
| Royal Albert | 0 – 5 | Glenafton Athletic |

== Fourth round ==
The fourth round draw took place at the offices of Evening Times newspaper, Glasgow on 12 December 2013.

| Home team | Score | Away team |
|---|---|---|
| Shotts Bon Accord | 2 – 2 | Dunbar United |
| Benburb | 2 – 3 | Whitletts Victoria |
| Camelon Juniors | 5 – 2 | Carnoustie Panmure |
| Cumnock Juniors | 4 – 1 | Neilston Juniors |
| St Andrews United | 1 – 2 | Bo'ness United |
| Tayport | 3 – 2 | Hill of Beath Hawthorn |
| Kilsyth Rangers | 3 – 3 | Largs Thistle |
| Girvan | 2 – 2 ^{3} | Rutherglen Glencairn |
| Musselburgh Athletic | 1 – 4 | Glenafton Athletic |
| Irvine Meadow | 2 – 2 | Petershill |
| Larkhall Thistle | 0 – 3 | Hurlford United |
| Cambuslang Rangers | 0 – 3 | Dundonald Bluebell |
| Yoker Athletic | 3 – 2 | Montrose Roselea |
| Pollok | 1 – 1 | Penicuik Athletic |
| Kilwinning Rangers | 1 – 3 | Sauchie Juniors |
| Dalry Thistle | 5 – 2 | Cumbernauld United |

^{3} Tie played at Largs Thistle F.C.

=== Replays ===
| Home team | Score | Away team |
|---|---|---|
| Dunbar United | 4 – 4 (3 – 4 pens) | Shotts Bon Accord |
| Largs Thistle | 3 – 3 (3 – 4 pens) | Kilsyth Rangers |
| Petershill | 0 – 2 | Irvine Meadow |
| Penicuik Athletic | 2 – 1 | Pollok |
| Rutherglen Glencairn | 1 - 1 (5 – 4 pens) | Girvan |

== Fifth round ==
The fifth round draw took place in the Cumnock Juniors Social Club on 26 January 2014.

| Home team | Score | Away team |
|---|---|---|
| Glenafton Athletic | 3 – 2 | Shotts Bon Accord |
| Dundonald Bluebell | 5 – 2 | Dalry Thistle |
| Whitletts Victoria | 4 – 1 | Yoker Athletic |
| Camelon Juniors | 3 – 3 | Sauchie Juniors |
| Penicuik Athletic | 0 – 0 | Irvine Meadow |
| Kilsyth Rangers | 0 – 4 | Cumnock Juniors |
| Tayport | 1 – 2 | Hurlford United |
| Rutherglen Glencairn | 1 - 2 | Bo'ness United |

=== Replays ===
| Home team | Score | Away team |
|---|---|---|
| Irvine Meadow | 4 – 3 | Penicuik Athletic |
| Sauchie Juniors | 1 - 3 | Camelon Juniors |

== Quarter-final ==
The quarter final draw took place on the Central FM Football Phone-In show on 26 February 2014.

| Home team | Score | Away team |
|---|---|---|
| Cumnock Juniors | 2 - 2 | Glenafton Athletic |
| Irvine Meadow | 1 - 0 | Bo'ness United |
| Dundonald Bluebell | 0 - 3 | Hurlford United |
| Camelon Juniors | 7 - 0 | Whitletts Victoria |

=== Replay ===
| Home team | Score | Away team |
|---|---|---|
| Glenafton Athletic | 2 - 1 | Cumnock Juniors |

== Semi finals ==
The draw for the semi-finals took place on the Central FM Football Phone-In show on 27 March 2014.

=== First leg ===
13 April 2014
14:30

| Camelon Juniors | 2 - 1 | Glenafton Athletic |
|---|---|---|
| Colin Leiper 26'; Craig Menzies 77' (o.g.) | Report | 3' Cameron Marlow |

Carmuirs Park, Camelon
Referee: Mike Taylor

12 April 2014
15:00

| Irvine Meadow | 2 - 1 | Hurlford United |
|---|---|---|
| Mark Thomson 50'; Darren Miller 80' | Report | 34' Paul McKenzie |

Meadow Park, Irvine
Referee: Alan Newlands

=== Second leg ===
20 April 2014
14:30

| Glenafton Athletic | 2 – 0 (aggregate 3 – 2) | Camelon Juniors |
|---|---|---|
| Cameron Marlow 14'; Finlay Frye 86' | Report |

Loch Park, New Cumnock
Referee: David Lowe

19 April 2014
14:30

| Hurlford United | 3 – 1 (aggregate 4 – 3) | Irvine Meadow |
|---|---|---|
| Stewart Kean 12', 74', 84' | Report | 24' (pen.) Darren Miller |

Blair Park, Hurlford
Referee: Gavin Ross

== Final ==
3 June 2014
21:05

| Glenafton Athletic | 0 – 3 | Hurlford United |
|---|---|---|
| | BBC Sport | 3' (pen.), 29' (pen.) Kieran Inglis; 81' Paul Mcdonald |

Rugby Park, Kilmarnock
Attendance: 5,854
Referee: Colin Steven

| 1 | Brian Hay |
| 2 | Craig McEwan |
| 3 | Alan Cairns (substituted off) |
| 4 | Ryan McChesney |
| 5 | Craig Menzies |
| 6 | Finlay Frye |
| 7 | Nick Dick |
| 8 | Jamie McKernon |
| 9 | Kris Doolan (substituted off) |
| 10 | Alain Kinney |
| 11 | Cammy Bell (substituted off) |
Substitutes:
| 12 | Steven Mills (substituted on) |
| 14 | Thomas Reilly (substituted on) |
| 15 | Euan Smith (substituted on) |
| 16 | Craig Brown |
| 17 | Scott Adam |
Manager:
Tommy Bryce

| 1 | Ally Brown |
| 2 | Paul Cameron |
| 3 | Paul Hay |
| 4 | Martin Brown |
| 5 | Jamie Glen |
| 6 | Jamie Wilson (substituted off) |
| 7 | Paul Mcdonald |
| 8 | Danny Mckenzie |
| 9 | Kieran Inglis |
| 10 | Ross Robertson (substituted off) |
| 11 | Calum Watt (substituted off) |
Substitutes:
| 12 | John Wills (substituted on) |
| 14 | Connor Scully (substituted on) |
| 15 | Jack West (substituted on) |
| 16 | Ewan Blair |
| 17 | Stevie O'Neill |
Manager:
Darren Henderson
