= 2016–17 Scottish Junior Cup =

Tournament details
- Country: Scotland
- Teams: 153

Final positions
- Champions: Glenafton Athletic
- Runners-up: Auchinleck Talbot

The 2016–17 Scottish Junior Cup was the 131st season of the Scottish Junior Cup, the national knockout tournament for member clubs of the Scottish Junior Football Association. The winner of this competition entered the following season's Scottish Cup at the preliminary round stage.

== Calendar ==
The provisional dates for each round of the 2016–17 tournament were as follows:

Round	Date	Matches	Clubs	New entries this round
First Round	24 September 2016	31	153 → 122	153
Second Round	22 October 2016	64	128 → 64	6
Third Round	19 November 2016	32	64 → 32	none
Fourth round	21 January 2017	16	32 → 16	none
Fifth round	18 February 2017	8	16 → 8	none
Quarter-finals	18 March 2017	4	8 → 4	none
Semi-finals	15/16 & 22/23 April 2017	4	4 → 2	none
Final	4 June 2017	1	2 → 1	none

Drawn matches are replayed the following weekend. Replays ending in a draw proceed direct to penalty shootout. Semi-finals are played home and away over two legs, subject to decision by the SJFA management committee.

== First round ==
The six Junior clubs qualified for this season's Scottish Cup, were not included in the draw for the first round:

- Auchinleck Talbot - West of Scotland Super League Premier Division champions
- Banks O' Dee - North Superleague champions (automatic qualifiers via National Club Licensing (NCL) award in any case)
- Beith Juniors - Scottish Junior Cup winners
- Bonnyrigg Rose Athletic - East Superleague champions
- Girvan - in possession of NCL award
- Linlithgow Rose - in possession of NCL award

The first round draw took place at Hampden Park, Glasgow on 25 August 2016.

Home team	Score	Away team
Armadale Thistle	1 – 3	Kennoway Star Hearts
Wishaw Juniors	2 – 0	Cumnock Juniors
Kirriemuir Thistle	4 – 0	Easthouses Lily MW
Whitletts Victoria	5 – 2	Buckie Rovers
Ellon United	0 – 1	Glasgow Perthshire
Newburgh Thistle	0 – 5	Sauchie Juniors
Ardeer Thistle	0 – 1	East Kilbride Thistle
Buchanhaven Hearts	0 – 2	Culter
Thornton Hibs	2 – 2	Dunbar United
New Elgin	1 – 8	Dundee North End
Jeanfield Swifts	3 – 0	Lugar Boswell Thistle
Livingston United	7 – 0	Cruden Bay
Pumpherston Juniors	3 – 0	Kirkcaldy YM
Saltcoats Victoria	0 – 2	Renfrew
West Calder United	3 – 0	Stoneywood Parkvale
Vale of Clyde	8 – 0	Sunnybank

Home team	Score	Away team
Irvine Victoria	2 – 1	Newtongrange Star
Newburgh	0 – 5	Hermes
Largs Thistle	0 – 1	Blantyre Victoria
Port Glasgow	5 – 0	Whitehills
Lochee United	2 – 1	Hurlford United
Bo'ness United	3 – 3	Bellshill Athletic
Lesmahagow	0 – 2	Irvine Meadow
Haddington Athletic	1 – 0	Troon
East Craigie	1 – 3	Bathgate Thistle
Broxburn Athletic	3 – 3	Glenafton Athletic
Ardrossan Winton Rovers	2 – 1	Dundonald Bluebell
Camelon Juniors	3 – 4	Whitburn
St Roch's	0 – 1	Kilwinning Rangers
Kilbirnie Ladeside	6 – 0	Banchory St. Ternan
Arbroath Victoria	4 – 4	Crossgates Primrose

=== Replays ===
Home team	Score	Away team
Dunbar United	3 – 3 (4 – 3 p.)	Thornton Hibs
Bellshill Athletic	1 – 6	Bo'ness United
Glenafton Athletic	3 – 1	Broxburn Athletic
Crossgates Primrose	1 – 3	Arbroath Victoria

== Second round ==
The second round draw took place at Bellsdale Park, Beith, on 1 October 2016.

Home team	Score	Away team
Forfar Albion	0 – 11	Blackburn United
Downfield	1 – 0	Nairn St Ninian
Yoker Athletic	2 – 3	Irvine Victoria
Dundee North End	5 – 0	Wishaw Juniors
Petershill	2 – 1	Dalkeith Thistle
Tranent Juniors	4 – 3	Longside
Hall Russell United	0 – 2	Maybole Juniors
Jeanfield Swifts	1 – 0	St Andrews United
Pollok	4 – 0	Glentanar
Carluke Rovers	1 – 0	Deveronside
Craigmark Burntonians	0 – 4	Penicuik Athletic
Forfar West End	0 – 2	Culter
Arbroath Victoria	3 – 4	Whitburn
Lewis United	1 – 3	Rosyth
Darvel Juniors	1 – 1	Ardrossan Winton Rovers
Greenock Juniors	2 – 1	Vale of Leven
Irvine Meadow	4 – 0	Oakley United
Burghead Thistle	0 – 3	Stonehaven
Islavale	9 – 0	Fochabers
West Calder United	0 – 2	Arniston Rangers
Lanark United	0 – 0	Neilston Juniors
Dundee Violet	4 – 1	Blairgowrie
Johnstone Burgh	1 – 2	Broughty Athletic
Coupar Angus	3 – 5	Forth Wanderers
Luncarty	4 – 1	Fraserburgh United
Kello Rovers	1 – 2	Carnoustie Panmure
Cumbernauld United	2 – 1	Rutherglen Glencairn
Kilwinning Rangers	0 – 0	Arthurlie
Dunbar United	5 – 0	Kennoway Star Hearts
Lochore Welfare	0 – 4	Kilsyth Rangers
Kirriemuir Thistle	3 – 1	Whitletts Victoria
Inverness City	3 – 5^{1}	Scone Thistle

Home team	Score	Away team
Glenafton Athletic	8 – 1	Livingston United
Vale of Clyde	0 – 3	Beith Juniors
Kinnoull	1 – 2	Glasgow Perthshire
Lochee Harp	3 – 5	Maryhill
Linlithgow Rose	3 – 0	Clydebank
Banks O' Dee	1 – 0	Kilbirnie Ladeside
Ashfield	1 – 1	Stoneyburn
Glenrothes	1 – 6	Hill of Beath Hawthorn
Newmains United	1 – 1	Hermes
Fauldhouse United	5 – 0	St Anthony's
Kelty Hearts	6 – 1	Aberdeen University
Bonnyrigg Rose Athletic	3 – 1	Rossvale
East End	0 – 6	Lochee United
East Kilbride Thistle	3 – 1	Forres Thistle
Port Glasgow	1 – 1	Thorniewood United
Annbank United	1 – 2	Auchinleck Talbot
Shettleston	2 – 0	Montrose Roselea
Edinburgh United	3 – 1	Dunipace Juniors
Royal Albert	1 – 3^{2}	Larkhall Thistle
Shotts Bon Accord	3 – 3	Haddington Athletic
Gartcairn Juniors	5 – 0	Newmachar United
Blantyre Victoria	2 – 0	Tayport
Dalry Thistle	0 – 4	Bo'ness United
Benburb	5 – 3	Dyce Juniors
Colony Park	0 – 4	Kirkintilloch Rob Roy
Dufftown	3 – 2	Pumpherston
Maud	5 – 1	Spey Valley United
Girvan	5 – 2	Muirkirk Juniors
Renfrew	6 – 4	Bathgate Thistle
Brechin Victoria	1 – 4	Sauchie Juniors
Cambuslang Rangers	1 – 2	Lochgelly Albert
Musselburgh Athletic	8 – 4	Craigroyston

^{1} Tie played at Clachnacuddin F.C.
^{2} Tie played at Larkhall Thistle F.C.

=== Replays ===
Home team	Score	Away team
Ardrossan Winton Rovers	1 – 2	Darvel Juniors
Neilston Juniors	2 – 1	Lanark United
Arthurlie	1 – 3	Kilwinning Rangers
Stoneyburn	1 – 2	Ashfield
Hermes	6 – 0	Newmains United
Thorniewood United	3 – 1	Port Glasgow
Haddington Athletic	3 – 3 (3 – 2 p.)	Shotts Bon Accord

== Third round ==
The third round draw took place at the offices of The Scottish Sun newspaper, Glasgow, on 1 November 2016.

Home team	Score	Away team
East Kilbride Thistle	1 – 1	Culter
Kirriemuir Thistle	1 – 4	Hill of Beath Hawthorn
Kilsyth Rangers	3 – 0	Lochgelly Albert
Penicuik Athletic	2 – 0	Scone Thistle
Haddington Athletic	2 – 1	Neilston Juniors
Blackburn United	2 – 5	Girvan
Thorniewood United	1 – 1	Bonnyrigg Rose Athletic
Stonehaven	1 – 1	Greenock Juniors
Luncarty	3 – 2	Rosyth
Dundee Violet	0 – 2	Glenafton Athletic
Dundee North End	0 – 5	Linlithgow Rose
Glasgow Perthshire	3 – 4	Kirkintilloch Rob Roy
Petershill	1 – 0 ^{3}	Carnoustie Panmure
Banks O' Dee	0 – 5	Sauchie Juniors
Renfrew	1 – 0	Arniston Rangers
Dufftown	1 – 2	Dunbar United

Home team	Score	Away team
Gartcairn Juniors	3 – 0	Whitburn
Lochee United	2 – 3	Musselburgh Athletic
Maybole Juniors	2 – 3	Benburb
Maryhill	2 – 0	Forth Wanderers
Blantyre Victoria	2 – 2 ^{4}	Bo'ness United
Darvel Juniors	1 – 1	Irvine Meadow
Irvine Victoria	1 – 2	Carluke Rovers
Larkhall Thistle	1 – 2	Fauldhouse United
Kilwinning Rangers	5 – 2	Shettleston
Beith Juniors	9 – 0	Islavale
Downfield	1 – 5	Broughty Athletic
Kelty Hearts	7 – 1	Ashfield
Pollok	1 – 1	Auchinleck Talbot
Edinburgh United	2 – 1	Maud
Jeanfield Swifts	2 – 3	Hermes
Cumbernauld United	2 – 1	Tranent Juniors

^{3} Tie played at St Anthony's F.C.
^{4} Tie played at Hamilton Academical F.C.

=== Replays ===
Home team	Score	Away team
Irvine Meadow	5 – 3	Darvel Juniors
Auchinleck Talbot	4 – 0	Pollok
Bo'ness United	2 – 2 (3 – 4 p.)	Blantyre Victoria
Culter	1 – 3	East Kilbride Thistle
Greenock Juniors	3 – 2	Stonehaven
Bonnyrigg Rose Athletic	4 – 0	Thorniewood United

== Fourth round ==
The fourth round draw took place at the offices of Evening Times newspaper, Glasgow, on 30 November 2016.

Home team	Score	Away team
Kilsyth Rangers	2 – 2	Bonnyrigg Rose Athletic
Cumbernauld United	1 – 3	Luncarty
Carluke Rovers	1 – 0	Irvine Meadow
Beith Juniors	0 – 1	Auchinleck Talbot
Renfrew	2 – 0	Greenock Juniors
Broughty Athletic	0 – 4	Sauchie Juniors
Kirkintilloch Rob Roy	2 – 1^{5}	Musselburgh Athletic
Fauldhouse United	0 – 0	Maryhill
East Kilbride Thistle	0 – 4	Glenafton Athletic
Girvan	1 – 3	Penicuik Athletic
Gartcairn Juniors	1 – 1	Hermes
Kelty Hearts	5 – 0	Hill of Beath Hawthorn
Petershill	7 – 1^{6}	Haddington Athletic
Dunbar United	3 – 1	Benburb
Edinburgh United	0 – 2	Kilwinning Rangers
Linlithgow Rose	4 – 0	Blantyre Victoria

^{5} Tie played at Benburb F.C.
^{6} Tie played at St Anthony's F.C.

=== Replays ===
Home team	Score	Away team
Maryhill	1 – 1 (5 – 3 p.)	Fauldhouse United
Hermes	2 – 2 (4 – 5 p.)	Gartcairn Juniors
Bonnyrigg Rose Athletic	3 - 0	Kilsyth Rangers

== Fifth round ==
The fifth round draw took place at Glasgow City Chambers, on 31 January 2017.

Home team	Score	Away team
Maryhill	2 – 4^{7}	Linlithgow Rose
Dunbar United	0 – 3	Glenafton Athletic
Penicuik Athletic	3 – 4	Kirkintilloch Rob Roy
Auchinleck Talbot	4 – 0	Luncarty
Kelty Hearts	1 – 2	Kilwinning Rangers
Gartcairn Juniors	2 – 2	Carluke Rovers
Renfrew	2 – 4	Sauchie Juniors
Petershill	0 – 2	Bonnyrigg Rose Athletic

^{7} Tie played at St Anthony's F.C.

=== Replay ===
Home team	Score	Away team
Carluke Rovers	2 – 3	Gartcairn Juniors

== Quarter-finals ==
The draw for the quarter-finals was made on 28 February 2017.

Home team	Score	Away team
Auchinleck Talbot	2 – 0	Kilwinning Rangers
Glenafton Athletic	1 – 0	Sauchie Juniors
Linlithgow Rose	7 – 0	Gartcairn Juniors
Bonnyrigg Rose Athletic	2 – 0	Kirkintilloch Rob Roy

== Semi-finals ==
The draw for the semi-finals took place on 28 March 2017.

=== First leg ===
15 April 2017
14:30

Glenafton Athletic	1–0	Bonnyrigg Rose
Orsi 58'

Loch Park, New Cumnock
Referee: Lloyd Wilson

15 April 2017
14:30

Linlithgow Rose	0–0	Auchinleck Talbot

Prestonfield, Linlithgow
Attendance: 1,349
Referee: Lorraine Clark

=== Second leg ===
22 April 2017
14:30

Bonnyrigg Rose	0–0	Glenafton Athletic

New Dundas Park, Bonnyrigg
Attendance: 1,244
Referee: Chris Graham

Glenafton Athletic win 1–0 on aggregate.

22 April 2017
14:30

Auchinleck Talbot	1–0	Linlithgow Rose
Young 38'

Beechwood Park, Auchinleck
Referee: Stewart Luke

Auchinleck Talbot win 1–0 on aggregate.

== Final ==
The Final of The ETHX Energy Junior Cup was played at Rugby Park, Kilmarnock on Sunday 4 June with a 4.15pm kick off. The game was televised live by BBC ALBA.

4 June 2017
16:15

Auchinleck Talbot	1 – 2	Glenafton Athletic
Milliken 18'	BBC Sport	28' Marlow; 76' Cairns

Rugby Park, Kilmarnock
Attendance: 6,144
Referee: David Dickinson

1	Andrew Leishman
2	Willie Lyle
3	Ross Harvey
4	Martin McGoldrick
5	Steven White
6	Stephen Wilson
7	Bryan Young
8	Craig McCracken (substituted off) 77'
9	Keir Milliken
10	Graham Wilson
11	Dwayne Hyslop
Substitutes:
12	Dylan Pooler
14	Mark Shankland (substituted in) 77'
15	Klark Thompson
16	Neill McPherson
17	Dylan Stevenson
Manager:
Tommy Sloan

1	Brian McGarrity
2	Kyle McAusland
3	Alan Cairns
4	Craig Menzies
5	Ryan McChesney
6	Ally Park
7	Dan Orsi
8	Cameron Marlow
9	Michael McCann (substituted off) 68'
10	Chris Dallas (substituted off) 81'
11	Darren McGill (substituted off) 73'
Substitutes:
19	Blair Lochhead
12	David Gray
14	Joe Andrew (substituted in) 68'
15	John Carter (substituted in) 81'
16	Connor Lyness (substituted in) 73'
Manager:
Craig McEwan
