= 2017–18 Scottish Junior Cup =

Tournament details
- Country: Scotland
- Teams: 157

Final positions
- Champions: Auchinleck Talbot
- Runners-up: Hurlford United

Tournament statistics
- Matches played: 150
- Goals scored: 659 (4.39 per match)
- All statistics correct as of 27 May 2018.

The 2017–18 Scottish Junior Cup was the 132nd season of the Scottish Junior Cup, the national knockout tournament for member clubs of the Scottish Junior Football Association (SJFA). The winner of this competition entered the following season's Scottish Cup at the preliminary round stage.

== Calendar ==
The provisional dates for each round of the 2017–18 tournament are as follows:

Round	Date	Matches	Clubs	New entries this round
First Round	23 September 2017	29	157 → 128	153
Second Round	28 October 2017	64	128 → 64	4
Third Round	25 November 2017	32	64 → 32	none
Fourth round	20 January 2018	16	32 → 16	none
Fifth round	17 February 2018	8	16 → 8	none
Quarter-finals	17 March 2018	4	8 → 4	none
Semi-finals	14-15 and 21-22 April 2018	4	4 → 2	none
Final	27 May 2018	1	2 → 1	none

Drawn matches are replayed and replays that end in a draw proceed direct to a penalty shootout, there is no extra time. Semi-finals are played home and away over two legs with the winner on aggregate progressing to the final. If the aggregate score is tied at the end of the second leg, the match will also proceed direct to a penalty shootout.

== First round ==
The four junior clubs qualified for this season's Scottish Cup, are not included in the draw for the first round:

- Banks O' Dee - North Superleague champions (automatic qualifiers via National Club Licensing (NCL) award in any case)
- Girvan - in possession of NCL award
- Glenafton Athletic - West of Scotland Super League Premier Division champions and Scottish Junior Cup holders
- Linlithgow Rose - in possession of NCL award

The first round draw took place at Hampden Park, Glasgow on 22 August 2017 and was made by SJFA president Felix McKenna and Linlithgow Rose club president Les Donaldson.

Home team	Score	Away team
22 September 2017
Maryhill	0–0	Irvine Meadow
23 September 2017
Culter	2–3	East Kilbride Thistle
Dunipace Juniors	0–4	Dunbar United
Kirkintilloch Rob Roy	5–0	Glenrothes
Glasgow Perthshire	2–2	Dundee North End
Rutherglen Glencairn	4–0	Kirriemuir Thistle
Arniston Rangers	1–0	St Andrews United
Ardeer Thistle	0–1	Yoker Athletic
Penicuik Athletic	7–0	Livingston United
Kello Rovers	3–4	Arthurlie
Longside	2–1	Deveronside
Troon	1–1	Renfrew
Bonnyrigg Rose	5–0	Shettleston
Lochee Harp	2–4	Bo'ness United
Tayport	1–2	Cumbernauld United

Home team	Score	Away team
23 September 2017
Burghead Thistle	2–5	Shotts Bon Accord
Thornton Hibs	2–0	Ellon United
Kilwinning Rangers	Awarded	Saltcoats Victoria
Musselburgh Athletic	4–0	Newburgh Thistle
Ardrossan Winton Rovers	6–2	Banchory St Ternan
Broxburn Athletic	6–0	Fraserburgh United
Rosyth	2–2	East Craigie
Pumpherston	1–3	Cambuslang Rangers
Aberdeen University	5–0	Kirkcaldy YMCA
Irvine Victoria	0–0	Maybole
Lewis United	1–2	Bathgate Thistle
Rossvale	1–0	Greenock Juniors
Hill of Beath Hawthorn	5–0	New Elgin
Newmains United Community	2–4	Annbank United

Notes

1. A-Saltcoats Victoria could not raise a team and forfeited the tie.

=== Replays ===
Home team	Score	Away team
30 September 2017
Irvine Meadow	0–0 (3–2p)	Maryhill
East Craigie	4–3	Rosyth
Dundee North End	0–1	Glasgow Perthshire
Maybole	0–3	Irvine Victoria
Renfrew	2–2 (2–4p)	Troon

== Second round ==
The second round draw took place at Hampden Park, Glasgow on 4 October 2017 at 2pm.

Home team	Score	Away team
28 October 2017
Shotts Bon Accord	13–0	Muirkirk
Newmachar United	2–7	Dyce
Lanark United	2–1	Dalkeith Thistle
Longside	1–4	Carnoustie Panmure
Vale of Clyde	4–1	Arbroath Victoria
West Calder United	3–6	Scone Thistle
Tranent	5–1	Easthouses Lily Miners Welfare
Kirkintilloch Rob Roy	6–0	Carluke Rovers
Lochee United	1–0	Armadale Thistle
Hill of Beath Hawthorn	4–0	Buckie Rovers
Lesmahagow	3–3	Arthurlie
Auchinleck Talbot	8–0	Forres Thistle
Dufftown	1–1	Oakley United
Forfar Albion	0–6	Haddington Athletic
Kilsyth Rangers	3–1	Stoneywood Parkvale
Sunnybank	1–6	Ashfield
Glasgow Perthshire	4–0	Kinnoull
Hermes	3–1	Blairgowrie
Fauldhouse United	2–3	Bonnyrigg Rose
Irvine Meadow	5–2	Broxburn Athletic
St Roch's	0–1	Bellshill Athletic
Neilston	2–3	Downfield
East Craigie	1–2	Newtongrange Star
Troon	3–1	Stoneyburn
Montrose Roselea	1–3	Coupar Angus
Port Glasgow	0–0	Petershill
Rossvale	3–1	Edinburgh United
Wishaw	1–1	Arniston Rangers
Thorniewood United	1–0	Dundonald Bluebell
Maud	5–3	Harthill Royal
Broughty Athletic	1–3	Bathgate Thistle
Rutherglen Glencairn	11–0	Glentanar
Craigmark Burntonians	0–5	Cumnock

Home team	Score	Away team
28 October 2017
Cruden Bay	Awarded	Banks o' Dee
Crossgate Primrose	1–0	Newburgh
Kilwinning Rangers	2–1	Larkhall Thistle
Brechin Victoria	0–4	Bo'ness United
Girvan	2–3	East Kilbirde Thistle
Gartcairn	9–0	Whitehills
Kennoway Star Hearts	3–2	Clydebank
Camelon	4–1	Hall Russell United
Whitletts Victoria	1–2	Jeanfield Swifts
St Anthony's	1–3	Yoker Athletic
Ardrossan Winton Rovers	2–4	Dunbar United
Lochore Welfare	3–1	Spey Valley United
Beith	12–0	Inverness City
Royal Albert	1–4	Pollok
Vale of Leven	3–2	Luncarty
Cambuslang Rangers	1–3	Stonehaven
Benburb	3–2	Craigroyston
Blantyre Victoria	3–0	Lochgelly Albert
Aberdeen University	1–2	Johnstone Burgh
Thornton Hibs	0–2	Cumbernauld United
Aberdeen East End	0–6	Blackburn United
Sauchie	3–1	Largs Thistle
Hurlford United	2–0	Nairn St Ninian
Dundee Violet	2–2	Forfar West End
Musselburgh Athletic	3–2	Darvel
Lugar Boswell Thistle	1–3	Linlithgow Rose
Buchanhaven Hearts	2–2	Whitburn
4 November 2017
Kilbirnie Ladeside	2–2	Penicuik Athletic
Dalry Thistle	1–5	Glenafton Athletic
11 November 2017
Forth Wanderers	1–0	Irvine Victoria
Annbank United	1–2	Colony Park

Notes

1. B-Cruden Bay could not raise a team and forfeited the tie.
2. C-Played at Abbey Park, Kilwinning
3. D-Played at Victoria Park, Irvine
4. E-Played at Dam Park, Ayr

=== Replays ===
Home team	Score	Away team
4 November 2017
Oakley United	3–2	Dufftown
Petershill	3–0	Port Glasgow
Arniston Rangers	2–3	Wishaw
Forfar West End	1–0	Dundee Violet
Whitburn	9–1	Buchanhaven Hearts
11 November 2017
Arthurlie	4–3	Lesmahagow
Penicuik Athletic	3–3 (3–4p)	Kilbirnie Ladeside

== Third round ==
Home team	Score	Away team
25 November 2017
Glasgow Perthshire	3–3	Pollok
Haddington Athletic	3–1	Vale of Clyde
Hermes	1–1	Dunbar United
Rossvale	3–2	Banks o' Dee
Troon	0–3	Yoker Athletic
Arthurlie	3–1	Coupar Angus
Vale of Leven	2–3	Bonnyrigg Rose
Bo'ness United	3–0	Kilwinning Rangers
Tranent	0–3	Jeanfield Swifts
Blackburn United	5–1	Colony Park
2 December 2017
Forth Wanderers	2–2	Lochore Welfare
Cumnock	5–1	Bathgate Thistle
Kilbirnie Ladeside	4–1	Lanark United
Kennoway Star Hearts	4–0	Blantyre Victoria
Gartcairn	3–1	Maud
Rutherglen Glencairn	6–0	Stonehaven

Home team	Score	Away team
16 December 2017
Forfar West End	4–2	Shotts Bon Accord
Kirkintilloch Rob Roy	1–0	Glenafton Athletic
23 December 2017
Scone Thistle	0–3	Kilsyth Rangers
Sauchie	3–1	Camelon
Bellshill Athletic	3–0	Ashfield
Oakley United	0–3	Linlithgow Rose
Downfield	2–2	Wishaw
Whitburn	4–1	Benburb
Thorniewood United	0–0	East Kilbride Thistle
Newtongrange Star	0–0	Cumbernauld United
Hurlford United	2–1	Musselburgh Athletic
Carnoustie Panmure	2–1	Petershill
Lochee United	Awarded	Johnstone Burgh
Crossgates Primrose	1–5	Beith
Hill of Beath Hawthorn	0–2	Auchinleck Talbot
13 January 2018
Dyce	0–2	Irvine Meadow

Notes

1. F-Played at John Cumming Stadium, Carluke
2. G-Played at Station Park, Forfar
3. H-Played at Petershill Park, Glasgow
4. I-Johnstone Burgh could not raise a team and forfeited the tie

=== Replays ===
Home team	Score	Away team
2 December 2017
Pollok	5–0	Glasgow Perthshire
Dunbar United	4–0	Hermes
23 December 2017
Lochore Welfare	1–2	Forth Wanderers
6 January 2018
East Kilbride Thistle	7–1	Thorniewood United
Cumbernauld United	0–4	Newtongrange Star
27 January 2018
Wishaw	5–1	Downfield

Notes

1. J-Played at K-Park Training Academy, East Kilbride

== Fourth round ==
Home team	Score	Away team
20 January 2018
Irvine Meadow	6–2	Dunbar United
Bonnyrigg Rose	5–2	Newtongrange Star
27 January 2018
Lochee United	5–0	East Kilbride Thistle
Blackburn United	0–5	Linlithgow Rose
Cumnock	1–5	Auchinleck Talbot
Bellshill Athletic	1–2	Sauchie
Whitburn	1–2	Yoker Athletic
Gartcairn	2–2	Arthurlie
Kirkintilloch Rob Roy	6–2	Kennoway Star Hearts
Rossvale	0–3	Pollok
3 February 2018
Kilsyth Rangers	0–2	Carnoustie Panmure
Jeanfield Swifts	2–6	Beith
Rutherglen Glencairn	0–3	Bo'ness United
Hurlford United	3–0	Haddington Athletic
Kilbirnie Ladeside	2–1	Forfar West End
24 February 2018
Wishaw	1–0	Forth Wanderers

=== Replay ===
Home team	Score	Away team
3 February 2018
Arthurlie	2–1	Gartcairn

== Fifth round ==
Home team	Score	Away team
17 February 2018
Kirkintilloch Rob Roy	4–3	Linlithgow Rose
Bonnyrigg Rose	1–2	Beith
Irvine Meadow	0–2	Lochee United
Kilbirnie Ladeside	0–3	Bo'ness United
Auchinleck Talbot	4–1	Pollok
Carnoustie Panmure	3–0	Arthurlie
Sauchie	0–1	Hurlford United
17 March 2018
Yoker Athletic	1–3	Wishaw

== Quarter-finals ==
Home team	Score	Away team
17 March 2018
Beith	1–4	Lochee United
Carnoustie Panmure	0–2	Auchinleck Talbot
Bo'ness United	2–2	Hurlford United
24 March 2018
Wishaw	2–0	Kirkintilloch Rob Roy

=== Replay ===
Home team	Score	Away team
24 March 2018
Hurlford United	2–1	Bo'ness United

== Semifinals ==
The draw for the semi-finals took place on 29 March 2018.

=== First leg ===
14 April 2018
14:30

Auchinleck Talbot	0–1	Lochee United

Beechwood Park, Auchinleck

14 April 2018
14:30

Wishaw	0–1	Hurlford United

Beltane Park, Wishaw

=== Second leg ===
21 April 2018
14:30

Hurlford United	1–1	Wishaw

Blair Park, Hurlford

Hurlford United won 2–1 on aggregate

21 April 2018
14:30

Lochee United	0–2	Auchinleck Talbot

Thomson Park, Dundee

Auchinleck Talbot won 2–1 on aggregate

== Final ==
The Final of the Scottish Junior Cup was played at Rugby Park, Kilmarnock on Sunday 4 June with a 4.15pm kick off. The game was televised live by BBC ALBA.

27 May 2018
16:15

Auchinleck Talbot	3–2	Hurlford United
Hyslop 37'; Wilson 90+1'; McCracken 90+3'	Report	Robertson 5' (pen.); McKenzie 64'

Rugby Park, Kilmarnock
Attendance: 4,874
Referee: Lloyd Wilson
