= Scottish Junior Football Association, North Region =

Scottish regional sporting body

The Scottish Junior Football Association, North Region was one of the two regions of the Scottish Junior Football Association. Its area covered Grampian and Moray as well as part of the Highland and Angus council areas – from Montrose in the south to Nairn in the west. The North Region featured three region-wide divisions, having reverted from the previous setup of two regional divisions below the North Superleague used for five seasons prior to 2018. It replaced the North Junior Football League (1968 to 2001) which had a similar territory and structure. On 5 July 2021, it was announced that the North Region leagues are joined from tier 6 by the North Caledonian League and Midlands League to form a fully-integrated lower tiers below the Highland League from 2021-22. In 2025 the league severed its membership with the Scottish Junior FA and became affiliated directly with the Scottish FA instead, altering its name to the North of Scotland Football League.

== Member clubs ==
There are 33 member clubs of North Region. Buckie Rovers and Spey Valley United are in abeyance for 2021-22.

=== North Superleague ===
Club	Location	Ground
East End	Aberdeen	New Advocates Park
Banchory St Ternan	Banchory	Milton Park
Banks O' Dee	Aberdeen	Spain Park
Bridge of Don Thistle	Newburgh	Gallowshill Park
Colony Park	Inverurie	Colony Park
Culter	Peterculter	Crombie Park
Deveronside	Macduff	Myrus Centre
Dyce Juniors	Dyce	Ian Mair Park
Ellon United	Ellon	The Meadows
Hall Russell United	Bridge of Don	Denmore Park
Hermes	Bridge of Don	Lochside Park
Maud	Maud	Maud Pleasure Park
Montrose Roselea	Montrose	Links Park
Nairn St Ninian	Nairn	Showfield Park

=== North First Division ===
Club	Location	Home Ground
Aberdeen University	Aberdeen	Hillhead Centre
Buchanhaven Hearts	Peterhead	Raemoss Park
Dufftown	Dufftown	Westburn Park
Fraserburgh United	Fraserburgh	College Park
Longside	Longside	Davidson Park
Stonehaven	Stonehaven	Glenury Park
Stoneywood Parkvale	Aberdeen	Clark Commercial Park
Sunnybank	Aberdeen	Heathryfold Park

=== North Second Division ===
Club	Location	Home Ground
Burghead Thistle	Burghead	Forest Park
Cruden Bay	Cruden Bay	Watson Park
Forres Thistle	Forres	Logie Park
Glentanar	Aberdeen	Woodside Sports Complex
Islavale	Keith	Simpson Park
New Elgin Juniors	Elgin	Nicol-Togneri Park
Newmachar United	Newmachar	Charles Gordon Park
Rothie Rovers	Rothienorman	
Whitehills	Whitehills	School Park

== Cup competitions ==
There were seven cup competitions in the North Region:

- The Jim McPherson Trophy This is a pre-season charity match, similar to the FA Community Shield, played between the previous seasons North Superleague champions and North Regional Cup winners. First played for in 2015, it is named after the late Assistant Secretary and Treasurer of the North Region.
- The North Regional Cup. Known as the Domino's Pizza North Regional Cup under a sponsorship arrangement, this is a knockout tournament for all North Region clubs.
- Grill League Cup. This is the opening tournament of the season. Clubs are drawn in eight groups with the group winners advancing to a knockout competition.
- McLeman Cup. Known as the PMAC Group McLeman Cup under a sponsorship arrangement, this is a knockout tournament for clubs in the North Superleague.
- Morrison Cup. Known as the AM Property Maintenance Morrison Cup under a sponsorship arrangement, this is a knockout tournament for clubs in the North First Division (East).
- Elginshire Cup. This is a tournament for clubs in the North First Division (West). Clubs are drawn in two groups with winners and runners-up advancing to the semi-final stage.
- North and Tayside Inter-Regional Cup. Known as the Signature Signs Cup for sponsorship purposes, this is a knockout tournament involving North Region clubs and Midlands League clubs. First played for in 1988, the cup is administered by a joint committee and clubs play early rounds in their own region with eight sides from each area progressing to the last sixteen.

Inactive

- The Archibald Cup This was added for North First Division (West) clubs in 2015–16 to bolster their fixture programme after the withdrawal of clubs from the league. The tournament is played in two groups with winners and runners-up progressing to the semi-finals.

== Roll of Honour ==
Season	North Premier Division	North Division One (East)	North Division One (West)
2001–02	Formartine United	Aberdeen Lads Club	Strathspey Thistle
2002–03	Sunnybank	Turriff United	Forres Thistle

Season	North Premier Division	North Division One	North Division Two
2003–04	Culter	Maud	Islavale
2004–05	Culter	Parkvale	New Elgin
2005–06	Culter	Dyce Juniors	New Elgin
2006–07	Culter	East End	Fochabers
2007–08	Banks O' Dee	Banchory St. Ternan	Bishopmill United
2008–09	Banks O' Dee	Buchanhaven Hearts	Inverness City
2009–10	Sunnybank	Fraserburgh United	Burghead Thistle

Season	North Superleague	North Division One	North Division Two
2010–11	Culter	Inverness City	Parkvale
2011–12	Hermes	Inverness City	Portgordon Victoria
2012–13	Culter	New Elgin	Colony Park

Season	North Superleague	North First Division (West)	North First Division (East)
2013–14	Culter	Inverness City	Cruden Bay
2014–15	Hermes	Grantown	Bridge of Don Thistle
2015–16	Banks O' Dee	Buckie Rovers	Colony Park
2016–17	Banks O' Dee	Spey Valley United	Ellon United
2017–18	Banks O' Dee	Nairn St. Ninian	Aberdeen East End

Season	North Super League	North First Division	North Second Division
2018–19	Banks O' Dee	Banchory St. Ternan	Buchanhaven Hearts
2019–20	All leagues null & void due to the COVID-19 pandemic. (Note: Using a 'points per game' algorithm applied in other leagues, Banks O' Dee (who were also leading the table when play stopped) would have been nominal champions of the Superleague; Aberdeen University would have been nominal champions in the First Division, and Forres Thistle in the Second Division.)		
2020–21	All leagues null & void due to the COVID-19 pandemic.		
2021–22	Banks O' Dee	Stonehaven	Rothie Rovers

Season	Premier League	Championship
2022–23	Culter	Sunnybank
2023–24	Culter	Islavale
2024–25	Culter	Lossiemouth United
