= Scottish Junior Football North Second Division =

- Founded: 2018 (7 years ago)
- Country: Scotland
- Number of clubs: 9
- Level on pyramid: 8
- Promotion to: North First Division
- Domestic cup: Scottish Junior Cup
- Website: SJFA North Region
- Current: 2021–22 North Second Division

The Scottish Junior Football North Second Division known as the McBookie.com North Second Division is the third tier of the North Region of the Scottish Junior Football Association. Clubs at the end of the season are promoted to the North First Division. It is part of the lowest level of the Scottish football pyramid.

It is essentially a resurrection of the North Division Two which ran until 2013, when the restructure of the Scottish Junior Football North Division One above into two geographical sections caused the lower tier to contain an impractically low number of members (6 teams), leading to its disbandment for five seasons until the previous three-division setup was adopted once again.

Club	Location	Home Ground	Finishing position 2018–19
Burghead Thistle	Burghead	Forest Park	
Cruden Bay	Cruden Bay	Watson Park	
Forres Thistle	Forres	Logie Park	
Glentanar	Aberdeen	Woodside Sports Complex	
Islavale	Keith	Simpson Park	
New Elgin Juniors	Elgin	Nicol-Togneri Park	
Newmachar United	Newmachar	Charles Gordon Park	
Rothie Rovers	Rothienorman		
Whitehills	Whitehills	School Park	

== Season summaries ==
Season	Winners	Runner up	Third
2018–19	Buchanhaven Hearts	Aberdeen University	Islavale
2019–20	Null and void (Note: Using the 'points per game' algorithm applied in other leagues, Forres Thistle would have been nominal champions narrowly ahead of Burghead Thistle.)		
