= Spey Valley United F.C. =

Association football club in Scotland

Spey Valley United
- Full name: Spey Valley United Football Club
- Founded: 2016
- Ground: Cromdale Park; Cromdale
- Capacity: 1000
- Coordinates: 57°20′22″N 3°32′20″W
Home colours

Spey Valley United are a Scottish football club from the village of Cromdale, Speyside. Members of the North Region of the Scottish Junior Football Association, they currently play in the North Second Division but are in abeyance during the 2021–22 season due to organisational difficulties caused by the COVID-19 pandemic in Scotland.

The club was formed in 2016 when neighbouring junior clubs Spey Valley (formed 2014) and Grantown (formed 2007) merged. The newly formed club took up residence at Cromdale Park where Spey Valley had been playing their home matches before the merger. Spey Valley United won the North Division One (West) in their first season, but they were denied promotion to the North Superleague due to not meeting ground criteria for the league.

== Honours ==
North Division One (West)

- Winners: 2016–17
