= RAF Lossiemouth F.C. =

Association football club in Scotland

- Full name: RAF Lossiemouth Football Club
- Nickname: The Crabs
- Founded: 1970
- Ground: RAF Lossiemouth
- Coordinates: 57°42′42″N 3°18′29″W
- League: Moray District League

RAF Lossiemouth F.C. are a football club representing the RAF Lossiemouth station in Moray, Scotland. Previously members of the Scottish Junior Football Association as well as entering Royal Air Force FA competitions, the club have currently withdrawn from SJFA North Region competition and now compete as members of the Scottish Welfare Football Association in the Moray District League. The present club date from 1970 although sides from the station had been playing under the banner of RNAS Lossiemouth since 1946. Club colours are red and black.

Operational duties can restrict the club's ability to field a settled or full strength team. After scratching a tie in the 2008–09 Scottish Junior Cup when ten players were training for forthcoming deployments, the club were controversially banned by the SJFA from the following seasons tournament.

The club played home fixtures at RAF Lossiemouth.

== Honours ==
- Matthew Cup: 1995–96
- North of Scotland (Morayshire) Cup: 1982–83
- Mike Simpson Cup: Winners 2015
- Mike Simpson Cup: Winners 2026
- WJ Tewnion Cup: Winners 2026
