= Hurlford United F.C. =

Association football club in Scotland

Hurlford United
- Full name: Hurlford United Football Club
- Nickname: The Ford
- Founded: 1912; 114 years ago
- Ground: Blair Park, Hurlford
- Capacity: 2,005
- Coordinates: 55°35′55″N 4°27′15″W
- Secretary: Clark Nicol
- Manager: Graeme Neil
- League: West of Scotland League Premier Division
- 2025–26: West of Scotland League Premier Division, 9th of 16
- Website: http://www.hurlfordunited.com
Home colours	Away colours

Hurlford United Football Club are a Scottish football club based in Hurlford, near Kilmarnock, Ayrshire. Nicknamed The Ford, they were formed in 1912 and play at Blair Park, wearing red and white. They currently play in the Premier Division of the West of Scotland Football League. They won the Scottish Junior Cup in 2014.

== League record ==
=== 1972–73 The Invincibles ===
In 1972–73, under the guidance of manager Davie Sneddon, Hurlford went the entire league campaign undefeated en route to the Ayrshire First Division Title.

=== 2012–13 West First Division Champions ===
In 2012–13, under long-term chairman Lorimer Headley and manager Derek McCulloch, Hurlford won the SJFA West Super League First Division to win promotion to the West Super League Premier Division for the first time in their history. Hurlford completed their programme on Saturday, 4 May 2013 with a 3–0 victory away to Kilsyth Rangers, which guaranteed second place and promotion. However, Rutherglen Glencairn had seven games left to play and were 21 points behind. The league title was finally confirmed eleven days later when Glencairn played out a goalless draw away to Thorniewood United on 15 May. This title win was all the more remarkable given that Ford had only avoided relegation the previous season by beating 2012 Scottish Junior Cup Winners Shotts Bon Accord in their last match of the season.

=== Junior Cup win, senior Scottish Cup and strong in the league ===
In the 2013–14 season, Hurlford not only kept their place in the Super Premier with a strong 3rd-place finish, but also won the Scottish Junior Cup for the first time, beating East Ayrshire rivals Glenafton Athletic 3–0 in the final at Rugby Park in Kilmarnock. This meant the club entered the senior Scottish Cup, a great feat for the small community of Hurlford, but almost even more remarkable, as local amateur team Hurlford Thistle also won the Scottish Amateur Cup in 2014, another achievement which granted entry to the senior Cup – but from the next season onwards, thus a historic double qualification into the country's most prestigious competition from the same village was narrowly missed due to its timing.

In the 2014–15 Scottish Cup, 'Ford overcame away ties against Highland League opponents Clachnacuddin (7–1) and Inverurie Loco Works (3–0), then took Scottish League One club Stirling Albion to a replay, extra time and a penalty shootout, which was eventually lost 13–12.

Hurlford finished Super Premier Division runners-up in both the 2014–15 and 2015–16 campaigns, finishing four points behind champions Auchinleck Talbot each time, and also being eliminated from the Scottish Junior Cup at the semi-final stage in both years. They reached the final again in 2018 but this time lost, again to neighbours Auchinleck and in dramatic fashion, conceding two goals in stoppage time after being 2–1 ahead on 90 minutes.

== Current squad ==
As of 10 July 2026

Note: Flags indicate national team as defined under FIFA eligibility rules; some limited exceptions apply. Players may hold more than one non-FIFA nationality.

No.	Pos.	Nation	Player
—	GK	SCO	Scott Johnstone
—	DF	SCO	Colin Granger
—	DF	SCO	Michael Lennox
—	DF	SCO	Scott Robertson

No.	Pos.	Nation	Player
—	MF	SCO	Ally Love
—	MF	SCO	Paul "Taz" McKenzie (Captain)
—	MF	SCO	David Blyth
—	MF	SCO	Dean Hawkshaw
—	MF	SCO	Calum Watt
—	MF	SCO	Jack Marks
—	MF	SCO	Nathan Gordon
—	MF	SCO	Ronan Makepeace
—	FW	SCO	Kane Howarth

== Coaching staff ==
As of 13 June 2026

- Manager - Graeme Neil
- Assistant Manager - Robert Love
- FT Coach - Martyn Brown
- Player/Coach - Ally Love
- Goalkeeping Coach - Robert Hamilton
- Scout - Alex Montgomery
- Physio - Sam Tata

== Honours ==
Scottish Junior Cup

- Winners: 2013–14
- Runners-up: 2017–18

West Region Premiership

- Runners-up: 2014–15, 2015–16, 2018–19

SJFA West Region First Division

- Champions: 2012–13

SJFA West Region Ayrshire District League

- Champions: 2007–08, 2009–10

Ayrshire League

- Champions: 1972–73
- Runners-up: 1942–43, 1944–45, 1969–70

West of Scotland Junior Cup

- Winners: 2017–18
- Runners-up: 2015–16

West of Scotland League Cup

- Winners: 2021–22

Ayrshire Cup winners (4): 1968–69, 1972–73, 1973–74, 2014–15

Ayrshire League Cup winners (5): 1940–41, 1944–45, 1971–72, 1975–76, 2015–16

Ayrshire District (Irvine Times) Cup winners (3): 1944–45, 1965–66, 1968–69

Kilmarnock & Loudoun Cup winners (5): 1986–87, 1987–88, 1989–90, 1990–91, 1992–93

East Ayrshire Cup winners: 2000–01

== Notable former players ==
David Bagan	Kilmarnock (Scottish Cup winner 1996-97)
Ian Bryson	Kilmarnock, Sheffield Utd and Preston
Stewart Kean	Ayr Utd and St. Mirren (Scottish Junior Cup winner 2013-14)
Walker McCall	Ayr Utd and Aberdeen
Davie Sneddon	Kilmarnock (Scottish Football League winner 1964-65)
Mark Roberts	Kilmarnock, Ayr Utd and Shelbourne (League of Ireland Premier Division winner 2001-02)
