= Falkirk Juniors F.C. =

Association football club in Scotland

Falkirk Juniors
- Full name: Falkirk Juniors Football Club
- Founded: 2011
- Dissolved: 2016
- Ground: Grangemouth Stadium; Kersiebank Avenue; Grangemouth
- League: Scottish Junior Football Association, East Region (2011–2016)
Home colours	Away colours

Falkirk Juniors Football Club were a Scottish football club based in the town of Grangemouth.

== History ==
Members of the Scottish Junior Football Association from 2011 until 2016, they played in the Scottish Junior Football Association, East Region The club was formed in 2011 to provide another option for part-time professional football in the Falkirk council area.

Joining the Juniors in 2011, Falkirk played in the East Region South Division, finishing third in their debut season. Club founder Sonny Lejman died in October 2012 but the club continued successfully and won promotion to the East Premier League in 2015. They finished tenth in the East Premier League in their final season.

The club were latterly managed from June 2016 by David Lapsley who succeeded club co-founder Karl Lejman in the role, but scratched their first league match of the 2016–17 season after being unable to raise a team. Falkirk Juniors folded with immediate effect on 8 August 2016 on the eve of their second fixture, with club officials citing the inability to attract supporters as the reason.

Previous managers were Terry Aikman (Season 2011–12), Mark Quinn (2012–13), Robert Lee (2013–14) and Lejman (2014–16).

== Colours ==
The club wore all navy blue with white trim, with a change shirt in white.

== Ground ==
The club was based at Grangemouth Stadium.

== League history ==
Season	Division	Position
2011–12	East Region South Division	3rd
2012–13	East Region South Division	13th
2013–14	East Region South Division	7th
2014–15	East Region South Division	2nd (promoted)
2015–16	East Premier League	10th
