= Portgordon Victoria F.C. =

Association football club in Scotland

- Full name: Portgordon Victoria Football Club
- Nickname(s): The Vics
- Founded: 2006
- Dissolved: 2015; 10 years ago
- Ground: Linzee Gordon Park; Buckie
- Manager: Graham Collie & Alan McPherson
- League: SJFA North First Division (West)
- 2014–15: SJFA North First Division (West), 10th

Portgordon Victoria Football Club was a Scottish football club based in the town of Buckie, Moray. Formed in 2006 as a Welfare club playing over the summer months, they successfully applied for membership of the Scottish Junior Football Association in 2011, and last played in the SJFA North First Division (West).

Initially, the club was known as Buckie Victoria however when the club secured Gordon Park in Portgordon as their home ground, a proviso was made that the village name is incorporated in the club's title. Gordon Park had previously been home to a Portgordon United club in the Juniors from 1993 to 2002. A cash dispute with former committee members of United led to the club being evicted in December 2013 and after a nomadic spell, the club were using Linzee Gordon Park in Buckie as their home.

The club announced in June 2015 they would be taking a year out after failing to find a new manager.
