= Steelend Victoria F.C. =

Scottish football club

Steelend Victoria
- Full name: Steelend Victoria Junior Football Club
- Nickname: The Vics
- Founded: 1995
- Website: http://steelendfc.webs.com

Steelend Victoria Football Club (commonly known as Steelend Vics) were a Scottish football club. Members of the Scottish Junior Football Association, the club were historically based at Woodside Park in the village of Steelend by Saline, Fife (west of Dunfermline) before being dissolved in 2013.

An original Steelend Victoria side ran from 1946 until 1963, winning the Fife Junior Football League in 1951, before changing their name to Comrie Colliery F.C. after accepting assistance from the National Coal Board. This side were runners-up in the Fife League in 1976 before folding in 1988; the most recent version of the club was revived in 1995.

The SJFA was restructured prior to the 2006–07 season, and the Vics were positioned in the twelve-team East Region, Central Division. They finished eighth in the first and 10th in their second season in the division. In season 2013–14, Steelend could not complete their fixtures and withdrew membership of the Scottish Junior FA.
