= Darvel F.C. =

Association football club in East Ayrshire, Scotland

Darvel
- Full name: Darvel Football Club
- Nickname: The Vale
- Founded: 1889
- Ground: Recreation Park, Darvel
- Capacity: 2,200 (65 seated)
- Coordinates: 55°36′32″N 4°16′40″W
- Manager: Nacho Novo
- League: West of Scotland League Premier Division
- 2025–26: West of Scotland League First Division, 9th of 16 (promoted)
- Website: https://www.darvelfc.com
Home colours	Away colours

Darvel Football Club are a Scottish football club based in the town of Darvel, Ayrshire. Nicknamed "The Vale" and formed in 1889, the club play at Recreation Park, and currently compete in the West of Scotland League Premier Division.

== History ==
The club reached the final of the 1975–76 Scottish Junior Cup, but were beaten 3–0 by Bo'ness United.

Darvel won the Ayrshire District League title in 2016–17 to gain promotion to the West Super League First Division (renamed as the West Championship), the second tier of the SJFA West Region league structure.

The team was managed from June 2013 to November 2017 by Scott Clelland. On 14 February 2019, Darvel announced that Mick Kennedy would be the new manager for the season 2019–20.

The club and Blantyre Victoria were declared joint-winners of the West Region Championship in 2019–20 after the season was prematurely halted by the COVID-19 pandemic.

Darvel joined the West of Scotland Football League in 2020–21 along with all other West Region junior clubs, and were promoted to the Premier Division for the inaugural season. In the first full season, they won the Premier Division in 2021–22.

On 23 January 2023, Darvel pulled off one of the biggest shocks in Scottish Cup history, as they beat Premiership side Aberdeen 1–0 in the fourth round at Recreation Park.

In November 2025, the club announced that former Rangers striker Nacho Novo had been appointed as their new manager.

== Players ==
=== Current squad ===
As of 24 June 2026

Note: Flags indicate national team as defined under FIFA eligibility rules; some limited exceptions apply. Players may hold more than one non-FIFA nationality.

No.	Pos.	Nation	Player
—	GK	SCO	Andrew Wilson
—	DF	SCO	Aeron Fitzpatrick
—	DF	SCO	Ross Barbour (Captain)
—	DF	SCO	Jordan Bow
—	DF	SCO	Barry Eley
—	DF	SCO	Scott Paterson
—	DF	SCO	Cammy Williamson
—	DF	SCO	Dom Boland
—	DF	SCO	Michael Hardie

No.	Pos.	Nation	Player
—	MF	SCO	Jamie Bowman
—	MF	SCO	Jamie Taggart
—	MF	SCO	Ben Richford
—	MF	SCO	Ross McKenzie
—	MF	SCO	Aidan Quinn
—	MF	SCO	Declan Hughes
—	MF	SCO	Billy Owens
—	MF	SCO	Joe Bradley
—	MF	SCO	Keir Ronney
—	MF	SCO	Kieran Moore
—	FW	SCO	Declan McDonald
—	FW	SCO	Alex Nimmo
—	FW	SCO	Mason Davies

== Coaching staff ==
As of 9 November 2025

Position	Name
Manager	Nacho Novo
Assistant manager	
Coach	
Sports Therapist	

== Honours ==
Senior
West of Scotland Football League Premier Division

- Champions: 2021–22

West of Scotland Football League Cup

- Winners: 2023–24

Junior
Scottish Junior Cup

- Winners: 2023–24
- Runners-up: 1975–76

West Region Championship

- Joint-winners: 2019–20

Ayrshire District League

- Winners: 2016–17
