= Port Glasgow F.C. =

Association football club in Glasgow City, Scotland

Port Glasgow Junior Football Club
- Full name: Port Glasgow Junior Football Club
- Nickname: The Undertakers
- Founded: 1948
- Ground: Port Glasgow Community Stadium
- Coordinates: 55°55′52″N 4°38′12″W
- Manager: Thomas Jamieson
- League: West of Scotland League Second Division
- 2025–26: West of Scotland League Third Division, 3rd of 16 (promoted)
- Website: https://portglasgowjuniorsfc.com/
Home colours	Away colours	Third colours

Port Glasgow Junior Football Club is a Scottish football club, based in the town of Port Glasgow, Inverclyde.

== History ==
Nicknamed the Undertakers, they were formed as Port Glasgow Athletic Juveniles F.C. in 1948 as an offshoot of Clune Rock Juveniles. They stepped up to the Junior ranks a year later and obtained a place in the Central Junior Football League. They are not related to the pre-War Port Glasgow Athletic Juniors who disbanded in July 1939 after losing their ground.

Their first ground was Woodhall Park, Port Glasgow where they played until being evicted by the local council in 2000 to make way for an industrial development, which was not built until 2014. They then groundshared with local rivals Greenock Juniors at both Ravenscraig Stadium and Battery Park, while Ravenscraig was redeveloped for the 2014 Commonwealth Games. The club returned to Port Glasgow in 2012 at a new £4.4 million community stadium at Parklea.

Currently playing in West of Scotland League Second Division, they wear white striped shirts with a black trim. The team is managed by Thomas Jamieson, assisted by Alex McWatters.

== Staff ==
Co-Managers: Thomas Jamieson
Ass Manager: Alec McWaters
Coach: Craig McCormick
Coach: Abou Mansare
Goalkeeper coach: Gary Hogan

== Honours ==
- Central League A Division winners: 1978–79
- Central League C Division winners: 1975–76
- Central Division Two winners: 1999–2000
- Glasgow Dryburgh Cup: 1957–58
- Evening Times Cup Winners Cup: 1999–2000
- Central League First Division winners : 2007–2008
- Pompey Cup Winners 1967–68
- Erskine hospital Cup winners: 1971, 1981, 1988
- Kirkwood Shield winners 1967–68.
