= Renfrew F.C. =

Association football club in Renfrew, Scotland

Renfrew Football Club
- Full name: Renfrew Football Club
- Nickname: Frew
- Founded: 1912
- Ground: New Western Park, Renfrew
- Coordinates: 55.8800°N 4.4018°W
- President: John Gilmour
- Manager: Jimmy Quigley
- League: Lowland League West
- 2025–26: West of Scotland League Premier Division, 10th of 16 (promoted)
- Website: https://www.renfrewfc.co.uk/
Home colours	Away colours

Renfrew Football Club are a Scottish football club based in the town of Renfrew. Formed on 6 May 1912, they play in the Lowland League West. The Frew wear a home shirt of blue and white stripes

== Current squad ==
As of 26 May 2025

Note: Flags indicate national team as defined under FIFA eligibility rules; some limited exceptions apply. Players may hold more than one non-FIFA nationality.

No.	Pos.	Nation	Player
—	GK	SCO	Danny McLeay
—	GK	SCO	Jack Donohoe
—	DF	IRL	AJ Doyle (on-loan from Queens Park)
—	DF	SCO	Fraser Barbour
—	DF	SCO	Logan Punton
—	DF	SCO	Joe Sexton
—	DF	SCO	Ryan Rutherford
—	DF	SCO	Ruari Duff (on-loan from St Mirren)
—	DF	SCO	Stuart Fyfe
—	DF	SCO	David McCallum
—	MF	SCO	Alan Cook
—	MF	SCO	Aedan Gilfedder (on-loan from Dumbarton)
—	MF	SCO	Dean Black (co-operation loan from Greenock Morton)

No.	Pos.	Nation	Player
—	MF	SCO	Gregor Wylie
—	MF	SCO	Liam McMenamay
—	MF	SCO	Louie Murphy (co-operation loan from Greenock Morton)
—	MF	SCO	Dominic Lavelle
—	MF	SCO	Grant Gaddi
—	MF	Jersey	Joey O'Toole (co-operation loan from Greenock Morton)
—	MF	SCO	Kieran Healy
—	MF	SCO	Sean Fyfe
—	MF	SCO	Olly Smith
—	FW	SCO	Fraser Sheridan
—	FW	SCO	Jojo Gillespie
—	FW	SCO	Aaron Chauhdry
—	FW	SCO	Aaron Millar
—	FW	SCO	Argyll McCoist
—	FW	SCO	Jordan Moore
—	DF	SCO	Rui Carballo

== History ==
Renfrew formed in 1912 after the previous Junior club in the town, Renfrew Victoria, went defunct in 1910; they also played at Western Park. A "senior" club based in Renfrew had also operated in the 19th century, and competed in the early years of the Scottish Cup.

The early years of the club saw the semi-finals of the national competition, the Scottish Junior Cup, reached several times – in 1914, 1918, 1933, 1936, 1947 and more recently 1978. The final has been reached three times, in 1917, 1962 and 2001. The first occasion saw no goals conceded on the way to the final, and it was only by a single goal that the final itself was lost, and this after a replay. Similarly, it was after a replay in 1962, when Rob Roy were the victors.

However, May 2001 saw Renfrew win their first Scottish Cup after defeating Carnoustie Panmure in the final at Firhill in Glasgow. After a tense 90 minutes of regulation time and 30 minutes of extra time, Renfrew won the match on penalties with captain Neil Shearer scoring the winner.

On 8 August 2015, New Western Park opened its doors with a 2–0 home win for Renfrew against Renfrewshire neighbours Johnstone Burgh.

== Honours ==
Scottish Junior Cup

- Winners: 2000–01
- Runners-up: 1916–17, 1961–62

West of Scotland Football League

- Second Division winners: 2022–23

SJFA West

- Super League First Division
  - Runners-up: 2005–06
- Central First Division
  - Winners: 2015–16

=== Other Honours ===
- Central League A Division winners: 1969–70
- Central Division One winners: 1991–92
- Scottish Junior Football League Division One winners: 1914–15, 1915–16
- Glasgow Dryburgh Cup: 1945–46, 1963–64
- Central League Cup: 1971–72, 1981–82
- War Fund Cup: 1917–18
- Victory Cup: 1918–19
- Renfrewshire Junior Cup: 1916–17, 1917–18, 1919–20, 1926–27, 1931–32, 1932–33, 1940–41, 1942–43, 1945–46, 1965–66
- Renfrewshire Consolidation Cup: 1923–24, 1932–33, 1949–50, 1951–52
- Kirkwood Shield: 1919–20 (shared), 1924–25, 1933–34, 1936–37, 1962–63
- Renfrewshire Dunbartonshire Cup: 1930–31, 1945–46, 1948–49, 1957–58, 1958–59
- Elder Cottage Hospital Cup: 1945–46
- Erskine Hospital Charity Cup: 1955–56, 1960–61, 1962–63, 1974–75
- Strathclyde Cup: 2022–23

== See also ==
- Category:Renfrew F.C. players
