= Islavale F.C. =

Association football club in Scotland

Islavale
- Full name: Islavale Football Club
- Nickname: The Vale
- Founded: 1949
- Ground: Simpson Park; Westerton Road; Keith
- Capacity: 1,000
- Coordinates: 57°32′29″N 2°56′26″W
- Manager: Michael Dunn
- League: NoSFL Championship
- 2025–26: NoSFL Premier League, 16th of 16 (relegated)
Home colours	Away colours

Islavale Football Club are a Scottish football club based in the town of Keith, Moray. Founded in 1949 as a Welfare side, they joined the Scottish Junior Football Association in 1952 and currently play in the NoSFL Championship. The club were based at Fife Park in the Fife Keith area of the town before moving to Simpson Park in 1998. The Vale are near neighbours of local Highland League side Keith, whose Kynoch Park ground they used to occasionally share. Team colours are red and black.

In 2024, Islavale would complete a league and cup double, winning both the SJFA North Championship and Elginshire Cup.

== Notable former players ==
- Colin Hendry – Former Scotland captain. Joined Dundee from Islavale in 1983.

== Honours ==
- North Region Championship winners: 2023–24
- North Region (North) League winners: 1970–71, 1996–97, 1997–98, 1998–99
- Morayshire Junior League winners: 1961–62
- North Region Division Two winners: 2003–04
- North Regional Cup: 2002–03, 2004–05, 2005–06, 2015–16
- Morrison Trophy: 2007–08
- Gordon Williamson Trophy: 1965–66, 1989–90, 1990–91, 1992–93, 1998–99
- Morayshire Junior Cup: 1960–61, 1964–65, 1971–72, 1980–81, 1995–96, 1998–99, 2000–01
- Matthew Cup: 1961–62, 1965–66, 1986–87, 1991–92
- Nicholson Cup: 1970–71
- Robertson Cup: 1966–67, 1989–90, 1992–93, 1996–97, 1998–99, 1999–00
- Clive Williamson Trophy: 1998–99, 1999–00
- Stewart Memorial Cup: 1961–62, 1990–91, 1991–92, 1996–97, 2000–01
- Connon Cup: 1954–55, 1956–57, 1967–68, 1998–99
- North of Scotland (Morayshire) Cup: 1966–67, 1970–71, 1971–72, 1976–77, 1986–87
- White Horse Cup: 1965–66
- Elginshire Cup: 2016–17, 2023–24
