= Thorniewood United F.C. =

Association football club in Scotland

Thorniewood United
- Full name: Thorniewood United Football Club
- Nickname: The Wood
- Founded: 1924
- Ground: Robertson Park, Viewpark
- Coordinates: 55°49′31″N 4°3′42″W
- Manager: Adam Coakley
- League: West of Scotland League First Division
- 2025–26: West of Scotland League First Division, 14th of 16
Home colours	Away colours

Thorniewood United Football Club are a Scottish football club, based in Viewpark, North Lanarkshire. Formed in 1924, they compete in the West of Scotland League First Division. Their home ground is Robertson Park and the team colours are all red.

== History ==
Nicknamed the Wood, they were formed in 1924 and play at Robertson Park, having moved from Thorn Park in nearby Tannochside in 1957 when the Caterpillar Tractor Company acquired the land to build a new factory at the time.

Negotiations to secure Robertson Park were made by the club's founder William Cowan with Caterpillar, who secured the site as a direct replacement for the original ground. A senior vice president of Caterpillar travelled from the US to meet with William to identify what was holding up the acquisition of the land.

In an agreement that resulted from the request to "move our park from here to there", Thorniewood moved to the current location and over the years have sold off parts of the land around the park. Robertson Park itself is named in recognition of the club's lawyer John Robertson, who provided much needed advice to William and other co-formers when the club was in its infancy.

While William Cowan will always be remembered as "Mr Thorniewood", many older supporters will recall that all of the Cowan family took roles in ensuring the club continued from washing the strips to collecting the gate money.

They currently compete in the West Region of the Scottish Junior Football Association; they wear all red strips (uniforms) with a change strip of all blue, although their original colours were either black and white striped shirts or latterly white shirts, black shorts and white socks. Thorniewood used to be called Tannochside Recreation for a short period in the 1960s but soon reverted to their original name. Tunnocks, the large biscuit manufacturer, are Thorniewood United's main sponsor and have been for many years. Fans of the club are known as Woodites or Woodies and The Shed Boys.

The club had its most successful era from the 1940s to the early 1960s, under the management of William Cowan, with its most recent league honour achieved in 1981 under the management of Stuart Noble.

In June 2015, Thorniewood won their first cup in 50 years when they defeated Blantyre Vics in a penalty shoot out to lift the Euroscot Engineering Central League Cup. The game had finished 2–2 with Thorniewood playing with nine men for 30 minutes after two straight red cards. The team have been managed since February 2017 by Gerry Bonham.

== Honours ==
=== Central League Division 2 ===
- Winners: 1992–93

=== Other Honours ===
- Lanarkshire League winners: 1950–51, 1955–56, 1959–60, 1963–64
- Central League C Division winners: 1980–81
- Lanarkshire Junior Cup: 1963–64, 1964–65
- Euroscot Engineering Central League Cup: 2014–15

== Former players ==
1. Players that have played/managed in the top two divisions of the Scottish Football League or any foreign equivalent to this level (i.e. fully professional league).
2. Players with full international caps.
3. Players that hold a club record or have captained the club.

- (Scotland) Jon Connolly
- (Scotland) Kyle Hutton (Present)
- (Scotland) David Dunn
- (Scotland) Ross Forbes
- (Scotland) Stuart Carswell (Present)
- (Scotland) Kenny Wright
- (Scotland) Denis McCormack
- (Scotland) Liam Anderson
- (Scotland) Frankie McAvoy
