= Buchanhaven Hearts F.C. =

Association football club in Peterhead, Scotland

Buchanhaven Hearts
- Full name: Buchanhaven Hearts Football Club
- Nicknames: Hearts, The Hearties
- Founded: 1908
- Ground: Raemoss Park; Victoria Road; Peterhead
- Coordinates: 57°30′41″N 1°47′8″W
- Chairman: Graeme Mackie
- Manager: Bob Buchan
- League: NoSFL Premier League
- 2025–26: NoSFL Premier League, 7th of 16
Home colours	Away colours

Buchanhaven Hearts Football Club is a Scottish football club from Peterhead, Aberdeenshire. Members of the Scottish Junior Football Association, it currently plays in North of Scotland Football League. The club is based at Raemoss Park in the Buchanhaven area of Peterhead. The team home colour is maroon & away colour is blue.

The original Buchanhaven Hearts side was founded in 1908 and existed as a Junior club until 1946. After several years in abeyance, the club re-formed in 1959 as a Welfare side before re-joining the SJFA in 1971. A new committee was formed in July 2023, on returning to the Premier division. The committee is working hard behind the scenes to modernize the football club and organising events and sponsors that will continue to provide financial stability for years to come.

The Buchanhaven Hearts social club supports the football club, making use of its bar and large function room to provide refreshments and hospitality packages for home fixtures.

== Honours ==
- North Region Division One winners: 2008–09
- North Region Second Division winners: 2018–19
- North East Division One winners: 1979–80, 1991–92
- McLeman Cup: 2024–25
- Archibald Cup: 1991–92
- Duthie (Acorn Heating) Cup: 1988–89, 1991–92
- Morrison Trophy: 1988–89
