= Newmachar United F.C. =

Association football club in Scotland

Newmachar United Junior Football Club
- Full name: Newmachar United Junior Football Club
- Founded: 1987
- Ground: Charles Gordon Park; Newmachar; Aberdeenshire
- Coordinates: 57°16′8″N 2°11′47″W
- Chairman: Brian Johnston
- Manager: Ewan Robb
- League: NoSFL Championship
- 2025–26: NoSFL Championship, 3rd of 15
Home colours	Away colours

Newmachar United Junior Football Club are a Scottish football club from the village of Newmachar, Aberdeenshire. The club currently plays in the North of Scotland Football League. They became members of the Scottish Junior Football Association in 2010, finishing as runners-up in their maiden season in North Second Division. The club formed in 1987 as an Amateur team and still retain a side in the Aberdeenshire Amateur Football Association. Based at Charles Gordon Park, the club colours are red and black.
