= Glentanar F.C. =

Association football club in Scotland

Glentanar
- Full name: Glentanar Junior Football Club
- Nickname: Glens
- Founded: 1978
- Ground: Woodside Sports Complex; Station Road; Woodside, Aberdeen
- Capacity: 1700
- Coordinates: 57°10′32″N 2°8′8″W
- Chairman: Jordan Gomez-Banderas
- Manager: Kieran Morrison
- League: NoSFL Championship
- 2025–26: NoSFL Championship, 9th of 15
Home colours	Away colours

Glentanar Junior Football Club is a Scottish football club based in Woodside, an area of the city of Aberdeen. Members of the Scottish Junior Football Association since 1998, they currently play in the North of Scotland Football League. The club are based at Woodside Sports Complex and their colours are yellow and blue. One of the founding members Alexsander Frank Jackson (Jay) is still with the club today as honorary president. Jordan Gomez-Banderas is the clubs current chairman since 2024. Jordan is supplemented on his committee by Joshua Thomas and George Douglas Snr. In the 26/27 Season Jordan has been supported by long-term friend and business partner Chris Kennedy to support the club as Head of Strategy.

The team were managed since March 2015 by Graham McBeath.

A change in management came in July 2026 with the resignation of Graham and this led to the appointment of Kieran Morrison. In Kieran's coaching staff he is complimented by Mark "Marko" Wilson as Assistant Manager and David Scarth Goalkeeping coach.
