= Cruden Bay F.C. =

Association football club in Scotland

Cruden Bay
- Full name: Cruden Bay Junior Football Club
- Nickname: The Bay
- Founded: 1934
- Ground: Watson Park which has one stand The "Terry Dando" Stand; Cruden Bay; Aberdeenshire
- Capacity: 2,500
- Coordinates: 57°25′33″N 1°50′49″W
- Chairman: John Esson Sr
- Manager: Brent Smith & Adam Ritchie (Co-Managers)
- Coach: Sean Park (Team coach)
- League: NoSFL Championship
- 2025–26: NoSFL Championship, 15th of 15
Home colours	Away colours

Cruden Bay Junior Football Club are a Scottish football club from the village of Cruden Bay, Aberdeenshire. Members of the Scottish Junior Football Association, they currently play in the North of Scotland Football League. Founded in 1934 as an Amateur side, they stepped up to the Junior grade in 1995. The club are based at Watson Park, formerly known as Bayfield Park, and the club's colour is purple.

== Honours ==
- North East Division One winners: 1997–98, 1999–00
- North Region Division One (West) winners: 2013–14
- Duthie (Acorn Heating) Cup: 1999–00
- Morrison Trophy: 1997–98, 1999–00
