= 2021–22 Scottish Junior Cup =

Tournament details
- Country: Scotland
- Teams: 110

Final positions
- Champions: Auchinleck Talbot
- Runners-up: Yoker Athletic

Tournament statistics
- Matches played: 104
- Goals scored: 446 (4.29 per match)

The 2021–22 Scottish Junior Cup was the 135th season of the Scottish Junior Cup, the national knockout tournament for member clubs of the Scottish Junior Football Association (SJFA).

A total of 110 clubs initially entered the competition, reduced from 132 in 2019–20, mainly due to more teams joining the East of Scotland League and clubs that did not retain SJFA membership after moving to the West of Scotland League. In addition, Annbank United, Buckie Rovers, Spey Valley United, and Pumpherston Juniors did not compete.

Auchinleck Talbot were the defending champions. They successfully defended their title for a second time with a 2–0 win over Yoker Athletic in the final.

== Calendar ==
The dates for each round of the 2021–22 tournament were as follows:

Round	Main date	Matches	Clubs
First round	21 August 2021	46	110 → 64
Second round	25 September 2021	32	64 → 32
Third round	23 October 2021	16	32 → 16
Fourth round	27 November 2021	8	16 → 8
Quarter-finals	12 March 2022	4	8 → 4
Semi-finals	16 April 2022	2	4 → 2
Final	4 June 2022	1	2 → 1

Drawn matches proceeded direct to a penalty shootout, there was no extra time. The semi-finals and final were played at a neutral venue, previously semi-finals were played home and away over two legs.

== First round ==
=== Draw ===
The first and second round draws took place at Thomson Park, Dundee on 3 July 2021. Unlike previous seasons, all clubs—including Auchinleck Talbot, Banks O’ Dee, Cumnock Juniors, Girvan, and Irvine Meadow XI who are also taking part in the Scottish Cup—were entered into the first round draw. 18 clubs received a bye to the second round.

Tier	6	7	8
Teams	Midlands League (15): Broughty Athletic; Coupar Angus; Downfield; Dundee North End; Dundee St James; Dundee Violet; East Craigie; Forfar United; Forfar West End; Kirriemuir Thistle; Letham; Lochee Harp; Lochee United; Scone Thistle; Tayport; North Superleague (14): Banchory St Ternan; Banks O’ Dee; Bridge of Don Thistle; Colony Park; Culter; Deveronside; Dyce Juniors; East End; Ellon United; Hall Russell United; Hermes; Montrose Roselea; Maud; Nairn St Ninian; West of Scotland League Premier Division (13): Auchinleck Talbot; Beith Juniors; Blantyre Victoria; Benburb; Cumbernauld United; Glenafton Athletic; Hurlford United; Irvine Meadow; Kilbirnie Ladeside; Kirkintilloch Rob Roy; Largs Thistle; Pollok; Troon	North First Division (8): Aberdeen University; Buchanhaven Hearts; Dufftown; Fraserburgh United; Longside; Stonehaven; Stoneywood Parkvale; Sunnybank; West of Scotland League Conferences (30): Ardeer Thistle; Ardrossan Winton Rovers; Arthurlie; Ashfield; Cambuslang Rangers; Carluke Rovers; Craigmark Burntonians; Dalry Thistle; East Kilbride Thistle; Gartcairn; Glasgow Perthshire; Glasgow United; Greenock Juniors; Johnstone Burgh; Kilsyth Rangers; Lanark United; Lesmahagow; Lugar Boswell Thistle; Maybole Juniors; Muirkirk Juniors; Newmains United; Petershill; Renfrew; Saltcoats Victoria; Shotts Bon Accord; St Rochs; Thorniewood United; Vale of Leven; Wishaw; Yoker Athletic	North Second Division (9): Burghead Thistle; Cruden Bay; Forres Thistle; Glentanar; Islavale; New Elgin; Newmachar United; Rothie Rovers; Whitehills; West of Scotland League Division 4 (1): Harthill Royal; East of Scotland Conference X (6): Bathgate Thistle; Fauldhouse United; Livingston United; Stoneyburn; Syngenta; West Calder United

=== Matches ===
Home team	Score	Away team
21 August 2021
Ashfield	5–0	Islavale
Auchinleck Talbot	3–1	Montrose Roselea
Banks O’ Dee	4–3	Harthill Royal
Bathgate Thistle	w/o	Vale of Leven
Beith Juniors	3–2	Maud
Bridge of Don Thistle	1–4	Lochee United
Burghead Thistle	0–4	Ardrossan Winton Rovers
Cambuslang Rangers	8–1	Fauldhouse United
Carluke Rovers	3–1	Sunnybank
Colony Park	1–1 (5–4 p)	Hurlford United
Cruden Bay	3–4	Lanark United
Culter	1–0	Hermes
Cumbernauld United	2–0	Kilbirnie Ladeside
Downfield	0–1	Blantyre Victoria
Dufftown	4–4 (3–4 p)	Letham
Dundee Violet	1–1 (2–4 p)	Thorniewood United
Dyce Juniors	6–0	Buchanhaven Hearts
East Craigie	3–1	St Rochs
East Kilbride Thistle	2–2 (10–9 p)	Broughty Athletic
Ellon United	0–2	Dundee St James
Forfar United	0–7	Muirkirk Juniors
Forres Thistle	0–6	Tayport
Gartcairn	4–1	East End

Home team	Score	Away team
Glasgow Perthshire	5–2	Ardeer Thistle
Greenock Juniors	1–2	Kirkintilloch Rob Roy
Hall Russell United	0–5	Renfrew
Irvine Meadow XI	4–0	Deveronside
Johnstone Burgh	4–2	Forfar West End
Kirriemuir Thistle	3–3 (10–11 p)	Petershill
Largs Thistle	2–1	Glasgow United
Lesmahagow	2–2 (4–5 p)	Dundee North End
Lochee Harp	2–9	Glenafton Athletic
Longside	1–1 (2–3 p)	Fraserburgh United
Lugar Boswell Thistle	1–7	Craigmark Burntonians
Nairn St Ninian	1–4	Shotts Bon Accord
Newmains United	2–1	Dalry Thistle
Pollok	7–0	Maybole Juniors
Rothie Rovers	0–1	Kilsyth Rangers
Saltcoats Victoria	0–7	West Calder United
Scone Thistle	4–2	New Elgin
Stonehaven	0–3	Syngenta
Stoneywood Parkvale	4–1	Wishaw
Troon	1–1 (9–10 p)	Benburb
Whitehills	0–13	Arthurlie
4 September 2021
Coupar Angus	0–2	Yoker Athletic
18 September 2021
Livingston United	2–2 (3–2 p)	Stoneyburn

== Second round ==
Tier	6	7	8
Teams	Midlands League (11): Arbroath Victoria; Blairgowrie; Brechin Victoria; Carnoustie Panmure; Dundee North End; Dundee St James; East Craigie; Letham; Lochee United; Scone Thistle; Tayport; North Superleague (5): Banchory St Ternan; Banks O’ Dee; Colony Park; Culter; Dyce Juniors; West of Scotland League Premier Division (12): Auchinleck Talbot; Beith Juniors; Benburb; Blantyre Victoria; Cumbernauld United; Cumnock Juniors; Glenafton Athletic; Irvine Meadow XI; Kirkintilloch Rob Roy; Largs Thistle; Pollok; Rossvale	North First Division (3): Aberdeen University; Fraserburgh United; Stoneywood Parkvale; West of Scotland League Conferences (27): Ardrossan Winton Rovers; Arthurlie; Ashfield; Cambuslang Rangers; Carluke Rovers; Craigmark Burntonians; East Kilbride Thistle; Gartcairn; Girvan; Glasgow Perthshire; Irvine Victoria; Johnstone Burgh; Kello Rovers; Kilsyth Rangers; Lanark United; Larkhall Thistle; Maryhill; Muirkirk Juniors; Newmains United; Petershill; Renfrew; Shotts Bon Accord; St Anthony’s; Thorniewood United; Vale of Leven; Whitletts Victoria; Yoker Athletic	North Second Division (2): Glentanar; Newmachar United; East of Scotland Conference X (4): Armadale Thistle; Livingston United; Syngenta; West Calder United

=== Matches ===
Home team	Score	Away team
24 September 2021
Rossvale	1–0	Cambuslang Rangers
25 September 2021
Aberdeen University	0–4	Lochee United
Ardrossan Winton Rovers	3–2	Maryhill
Armadale Thistle	w/o	Dyce Juniors
Banks O’ Dee	4–2	Syngenta
Blairgowrie	1–7	Benburb
Blantyre Victoria	0–1	West Calder United
Brechin Victoria	1–2	Newmachar United
Carluke Rovers	1–2	Auchinleck Talbot
Carnoustie Panmure	3–0	Fraserburgh United
Culter	0–3	Beith Juniors
Dundee North End	3–0	Colony Park
Dundee St James	1–4	Johnstone Burgh
East Craigie	7–2	Banchory St Ternan
Gartcairn	5–2	Tayport

Home team	Score	Away team
Girvan	2–3	Yoker Athletic
Glasgow Perthshire	4–1	Scone Thistle
Glentanar	1–6	Kirkintilloch Rob Roy
Irvine Meadow XI	4–1	Arbroath Victoria
Irvine Victoria	A–A (1–2)	Pollok
Kilsyth Rangers	3–4	Arthurlie
Lanark United	0–2	East Kilbride Thistle
Largs Thistle	5–3	Larkhall Thistle
Letham	2–2 (2–4 p)	Muirkirk Juniors
Livingston United	1–4	Cumbernauld United
Newmains United	0–4	Vale of Leven
Petershill	4–0	Stoneywood Parkvale
Renfrew	3–4	Craigmark Burntonians
Shotts Bon Accord	w/o	Kello Rovers
St Anthony’s	1–1 (2–4 p)	Ashfield
Thorniewood United	3–2	Whitletts Victoria
13 October 2021
Cumnock Juniors	1–1 (5–3 p)	Glenafton Athletic

== Third round ==
Tier	6	7	8
Teams	Midlands League (4): Carnoustie Panmure; Dundee North End; East Craigie; Lochee United; North Superleague (2): Banks O’ Dee; Dyce Juniors; West of Scotland League Premier Division (9): Auchinleck Talbot; Beith Juniors; Benburb; Cumbernauld United; Cumnock Juniors; Irvine Meadow XI; Kirkintilloch Rob Roy; Largs Thistle; Rossvale	West of Scotland League Conferences (14): Ardrossan Winton Rovers; Arthurlie; Ashfield; Craigmark Burntonians; Gartcairn; Glasgow Perthshire; Johnstone Burgh; East Kilbride Thistle; Muirkirk Juniors; Petershill; Shotts Bon Accord; Thorniewood United; Vale of Leven; Yoker Athletic	North Second Division: Newmachar United; East of Scotland Conference X: West Calder United

=== Matches ===
Home team	Score	Away team
23 October 2021
Carnoustie Panmure	3–4	Kirkintilloch Rob Roy
East Craigie	1–1 (4–5 p)	Johnstone Burgh
Dyce Juniors	4–2	West Calder United
Gartcairn	6–0	Beith Juniors
Glasgow Perthshire	1–6	Arthurlie
Irvine Meadow XI	5–2	Cumbernauld United
Muirkirk Juniors	2–1	Ardrossan Winton Rovers
Newmachar United	0–2	Dundee North End
Petershill	3–0	Benburb
Rossvale	w/o	Irvine Victoria or Pollok
Shotts Bon Accord	1–0	Thorniewood United
Vale of Leven	2–2 (1–4 p)	Ashfield
Cumnock Juniors	1–1 (2–4 p)	Largs Thistle
Yoker Athletic	3–1	East Kilbride Thistle
6 November 2021
Lochee United	1–0	Banks O’ Dee
8 January 2022
Craigmark Burntonians	0–2	Auchinleck Talbot

== Fourth round ==
Tier	6	7
Teams	Midlands League (2): Dundee North End; Lochee United; North Superleague (1): Dyce Juniors; West of Scotland League Premier Division (5): Auchinleck Talbot; Irvine Meadow XI; Kirkintilloch Rob Roy; Largs Thistle; Rossvale	West of Scotland League Conferences (8): Arthurlie; Ashfield; Gartcairn; Johnstone Burgh; Muirkirk Juniors; Petershill; Shotts Bon Accord; Yoker Athletic

Home team	Score	Away team
26 November 2021
Yoker Athletic	3–1	Ashfield
27 November 2021
Gartcairn	1–4	Arthurlie
Johnstone Burgh	1–3	Kirkintilloch Rob Roy
Largs Thistle	1–0	Dundee North End
Muirkirk Juniors	0–1	Dyce Juniors
Petershill	2–1	Lochee United
15 January 2022
Auchinleck Talbot	3–2	Irvine Meadow XI
Shotts Bon Accord	1–0	Rossvale

== Quarter-finals ==
Tier	6	7
Teams	North Superleague (1): Dyce Juniors; West of Scotland League Premier Division (3): Auchinleck Talbot; Kirkintilloch Rob Roy; Largs Thistle	West of Scotland League Conferences (4): Arthurlie; Petershill; Shotts Bon Accord; Yoker Athletic

Home team	Score	Away team
12 March 2022
Dyce Juniors	0–1	Yoker Athletic
Kirkintilloch Rob Roy	4–1	Arthurlie
Largs Thistle	2–3	Petershill
Shotts Bon Accord	1–2	Auchinleck Talbot

== Semi-finals ==
Home team	Score	Away team
16 April 2022
Auchinleck Talbot	2–1	Kirkintilloch Rob Roy
Petershill	1–2	Yoker Athletic

== Final ==
The Final of the Scottish Junior Cup was played at Rugby Park, Kilmarnock on Saturday 4 June with a 4.10pm kick off. The game was televised live by BBC Alba.

4 June 2022
16:10

Auchinleck Talbot	2–0	Yoker Athletic
McCracken 73'; Glasgow 89'

Rugby Park, Kilmarnock
Attendance: 3,500
Referee: Greg Soutar
