= 2021–22 Midlands Football League =

Scottish football league season

Midlands Football League
- Season: 2021–22
- Dates: 17 July 2021 – 17 May 2022
- Champions: Carnoustie Panmure
- Matches: 342
- Goals: 1,589 (4.65 per match)
- Biggest home win: Broughty Athletic 13–0 Kirriemuir Thistle (30 October 2021)
- Biggest away win: Lochee Harp 0–15 Carnoustie Panmure (22 February 2022)
- Highest scoring: Lochee Harp 0–15 Carnoustie Panmure (22 February 2022)
- Longest winning run: 17 matches: Carnoustie Panmure
- Longest unbeaten run: 25 matches: East Craigie
- Longest winless run: 33 matches: Scone Thistle
- Longest losing run: 15 matches: Scone Thistle

The 2021–22 Midlands Football League was the inaugural season of the Midlands Football League, the sixth tier of the Scottish football pyramid system. The season began with nine games on 17 July 2021.

Carnoustie Panmure became the inaugural league champions, winning their last seventeen games of the season to overhaul East Craigie and ultimately win the league by five points.

== Teams ==
Location of teams in 2021–22 Midlands Football League
Location of teams in 2021–22 Midlands Football League within Dundee
Location of teams in 2021–22 Midlands Football League within Angus and Fife

All 17 teams from the 2020–21 East Premiership North joined the league, along with Dundee St James (formerly Fintry AFC) from the Midlands Amateur Football Association and Letham from the Perthshire Amateur Football Association.

=== Stadia and locations ===
Club	Location	Home Ground	Capacity	Seats	Floodlit
Arbroath Victoria	Arbroath	Ogilvy Park	4,000	0	Yes
Blairgowrie	Blairgowrie	Davie Park	2,500	0	Yes
Brechin Victoria	Brechin	Victoria Park	600	100	Yes
Broughty Athletic	Dundee	Whitton Park	2,500	0	Yes
Carnoustie Panmure	Carnoustie	Laing Park	1,500	0	No
Coupar Angus	Coupar Angus	Foxhall Park	1,800	0	Yes
Downfield	Dundee	Downfield Park	2,500	13	Yes
Dundee North End	Dundee	North End Park	2,000	0	Yes
Dundee St James	Dundee	Fairfield Park	TBC	0	No
Dundee Violet	Dundee	Glenesk Park	2,000	0	No
East Craigie	Dundee	Craigie Park	3,300	0	No
Forfar United	Forfar	Guthrie Park	2,500	0	No
Forfar West End	Forfar	Strathmore Park	2,500	0	No
Kirriemuir Thistle	Kirriemuir	Westview Park	2,000	32	Yes
Letham	Perth	Seven Acres Park	TBC	0	Yes
Lochee Harp	Dundee	Lochee Community Sports Hub	TBC	0	Yes
Lochee United	Dundee	Thomson Park	3,200	0	Yes
Scone Thistle	Scone	Farquharson Park	1,000	0	No
Tayport	Tayport	Canniepairt	2,000	0	Yes

== League table ==
Pos	Team	Pld	W	D	L	GF	GA	GD	Pts	Qualification
1	Carnoustie Panmure (C)	36	32	2	2	153	30	+123	98	Ineligible for the Highland League play-off
2	East Craigie	36	30	3	3	146	31	+115	93	
3	Lochee United	36	29	2	5	140	28	+112	89	
4	Dundee North End	36	24	6	6	103	43	+60	78	
5	Broughty Athletic	36	24	5	7	146	50	+96	77	
6	Tayport	36	23	6	7	101	47	+54	75	
7	Kirriemuir Thistle	36	17	4	15	81	81	0	55	
8	Forfar West End	36	13	10	13	55	66	−11	49	
9	Arbroath Victoria	36	14	6	16	80	85	−5	48	
10	Brechin Victoria	36	14	3	19	70	97	−27	45	
11	Dundee Violet	36	13	5	18	50	70	−20	44	
12	Downfield	36	13	5	18	51	84	−33	44	
13	Blairgowrie	36	13	2	21	68	92	−24	41	
14	Lochee Harp	36	13	2	21	69	110	−41	41	
15	Letham	36	11	4	21	76	102	−26	37	
16	Dundee St James	36	9	5	22	68	106	−38	32	
17	Forfar United	36	6	3	27	46	128	−82	21	
18	Coupar Angus	36	4	3	29	47	148	−101	15	
19	Scone Thistle	36	1	2	33	39	191	−152	5	

Rules for classification: 1) Points; 2) Goal difference; 3) Goals scored
(C) Champions

== Results ==
Each team will play each other twice, for a total of 36 fixtures.

Home \ Away	ARB	BLA	BRE	BRO	CAR	COU	DOW	DNE	DSJ	DUV	ECR	FWE	FUN	KIR	LET	LHA	LOU	SCO	TAY
Arbroath Victoria		1–2	2–1	3–8	0–7	1–1	2–3	2–2	1–0	0–0	3–4	2–2	4–0	4–3	1–4	2–0	1–2	9–2	2–1
Blairgowrie	1–4		3–1	0–1	0–6	6–3	2–3	1–2	3–4	2–4	0–5	0–1	3–1	1–1	6–1	2–3	0–2 (Note: Match played at Strathmore Park, Forfar.)	3–1	0–6
Brechin Victoria	1–2	1–2		2–4	1–8	4–1	2–1	1–3	4–3	3–1	0–5	0–3	6–0	1–2	2–2	1–2	0–9	3–1	1–1
Broughty Athletic	3–1	5–2	6–0		1–4	2–2	9–0	1–3	10–0	6–0	2–2	3–3	7–0	13–0	6–5	6–1	1–0	10–1	0–1
Carnoustie Panmure	3–0	3–0	7–0	2–0		3–2	2–0	3–2	8–1	3–1	5–2	2–2	5–0	3–2	4–2	6–1	2–1	4–0	5–0
Coupar Angus	2–5	1–3	0–7	4–7	0–5		1–1	0–6	1–4	0–5	0–11	0–3	6–1	0–5	2–3	0–5	2–0	6–1	1–3
Downfield	2–1	4–2	1–3	0–2	0–5	1–0		0–5	2–2	0–1	0–4	0–0	1–1	2–4	0–3	4–0	0–5	4–0	3–2
Dundee North End	2–0	2–0	3–0	1–1	1–3	6–0	2–0		6–3	3–1	0–1	1–1	2–2	3–1	6–3	2–0	1–2	5–1	2–2
Dundee St James	1–1	2–3	0–2	2–1	1–5	6–0	2–4	1–2		0–0	2–3	1–3	3–2	2–3	5–4	7–0	0–7	4–1	1–3
Dundee Violet	0–2	1–3	0–2	0–5	1–4	2–0	1–0	1–3	2–2		1–5	2–0	3–0	1–1	1–2	2–1	0–4	2–0	2–2
East Craigie	5–1	2–0	5–1	4–0	2–1	7–1	8–0	0–1	7–1	3–0 (Note: Match played at Downfield Park.)		2–1	12–0	2–0	2–1	4–0	0–1	9–2	1–1
Forfar West End	1–1	0–3	0–0	1–2	0–5	2–1	1–1	1–4	3–0	0–1	0–3 (Note: Match played at Station Park.)		3–2	2–1	5–0	0–1	1–8	4–1	2–5
Forfar United	5–3	1–4	1–5	0–4	0–3	6–2	0–3	0–4	1–0	1–3	1–5	4–0		1–3	1–0	1–4	1–5	2–3	1–1
Kirriemuir Thistle	4–3	3–2	3–0	2–4	0–2	5–2	1–2	2–1	2–1	2–1	1–2	2–3	4–2		6–1	4–1	0–4	7–1	1–3
Letham	0–4	3–1	1–2	1–3	3–3	3–1	2–3	2–6	3–0	1–2	1–4	1–1	6–1	1–1		1–3	0–6	5–0	2–3
Lochee Harp	1–2	2–5	3–6	1–1	0–15	2–1	2–1	2–5	2–2	2–0	0–6	2–3	3–2	3–1	1–3		0–2	8–2	1–7
Lochee United	9–2	5–0	4–0	2–0	2–1	9–0	3–1	2–2	5–0	4–3	0–2	0–0	3–0	5–1	6–0	2–1		8–1	0–2
Scone Thistle	0–7	3–3	2–6	0–10	1–4	2–4	1–3	1–4	1–5	0–4	3–7	0–1	1–4	1–1	1–4	0–10	2–9		1–6
Tayport	3–1	4–0	6–1	0–2	1–2	6–0	3–1	2–0	1–0	4–1	0–0	5–2	4–1	1–2	3–2	2–1	1–4	6–1	

Legend: Blue = home team win; Yellow = draw; Red = away team win.
