= 2023–24 Midlands Football League =

Scottish football league season

Midlands Football League
- Season: 2023–24
- Dates: 22 July 2023 – 3 June 2024
- Champions: Dundee North End
- Matches: 380
- Goals: 1,599 (4.21 per match)
- Biggest home win: Lochee United 10–0 Letham (30 September 2023)
- Biggest away win: Brechin Victoria 0–10 Broughty Athletic (10 February 2024); Arbroath Victoria 0–10 Kirriemuir Thistle (4 May 2024); Forfar West End 0–10 Dundee North End (4 May 2024)
- Highest scoring: 8 matches: 10 goals (Note: The matches were Arbroath Victoria 1–9 Lochee United on 12 August 2023, Lochee Harp 4–6 East Craigie on 23 August 2023, Lochee United 9–1 Forfar United on 23 August 2023, Lochee United 10–0 Letham on 30 September 2023, Brechin Victoria 0–10 Broughty Athletic on 10 February 2024, Arbroath Victoria 0–10 Kirriemuir Thistle on 4 May 2024, Forfar West End 0–10 Dundee North End on 4 May 2024, and Downfield 5–5 Dundee St James on 22 May 2024.)
- Longest winning run: 16 matches: Dundee North End
- Longest unbeaten run: 34 matches: Dundee North End
- Longest winless run: 22 matches: Coupar Angus
- Longest losing run: 13 matches: Forfar West End
- All statistics correct as of 3 June 2024.

The 2023–24 Midlands Football League was the third season of the Midlands Football League, part of the sixth tier of the Scottish football pyramid system. Carnoustie Panmure were the reigning champions for the second season in a row, but could only finish fifth in the table.

Dundee North End won their first title following the culmination of a 34-match unbeaten run, overhauling Broughty Athletic's tally of 103 points by a point. Dundee North End had won their last thirteen games, seven of which were played after Broughty Athletic's final match.

== Teams ==
Location of teams in 2023-24 Midlands Football League
Location of teams in 2023–24 Midlands Football League within Dundee
Location of teams in 2023–24 Midlands Football League within Angus and Fife

Montrose Roselea rejoined the SJFA East Region to increase the league's membership to 20 teams, having spent six seasons playing in the North Region.

=== To Midlands League ===
Transferred from North Region Premier League

- Montrose Roselea

=== Stadia and locations ===
Club	Location	Home Ground	Surface	Capacity	Seats	Floodlit
Arbroath Victoria	Arbroath	Ogilvy Park	Grass	1,000	0	No
Blairgowrie	Blairgowrie	Davie Park	Artificial	1,200	0	Yes
Brechin Victoria	Brechin	Victoria Park	Grass	800	100	No
Broughty Athletic	Dundee	Whitton Park	Artificial	1000	0,	Yes
Carnoustie Panmure	Carnoustie	Laing Park	Grass	1,500	0	No
Coupar Angus	Coupar Angus	Foxhall Park	Grass	800	0	No
Downfield	Dundee	Downfield Park	Grass	2,000	13	No
Dundee North End	Dundee	North End Park	Grass	2,000	0	No
Dundee St James	Dundee	Fairfield Park	Grass	1,200	0	No
Dundee Violet	Dundee	Glenesk Park	Grass	1,500	0	No
East Craigie	Dundee	Craigie Park	Grass	2,000	0	No
Forfar United	Forfar	Guthrie Park	Grass	1,500	0	No
Forfar West End	Forfar	Strathmore Park	Grass	1,200	0	No
Kirriemuir Thistle	Kirriemuir	Westview Park	Grass	1,500	32	No
Letham	Perth	Seven Acres Park	Artificial	300	0	Yes
Lochee Harp	Dundee	Lochee Community Sports Hub	Artificial	500	0	Yes
Lochee United ^{[SFA]}	Dundee	Thomson Park	Grass	2,000	0	Yes
Montrose Roselea	Montrose	Links Park	Artificial	4,936	1,338	Yes
Scone Thistle	Scone	Farquharson Park	Grass	800	0	No
Tayport ^{[SFA]}	Tayport	Canniepairt	Grass	2,500	0	Yes

== League table ==
Pos	Team	Pld	W	D	L	GF	GA	GD	Pts	Qualification
1	Dundee North End (C)	38	34	2	2	140	25	+115	104	Ineligible for the Highland League play-off
2	Broughty Athletic	38	34	1	3	148	34	+114	103	
3	Lochee United	38	29	6	3	154	37	+117	93	
4	Downfield	38	29	1	8	128	53	+75	88	
5	Carnoustie Panmure	38	24	5	9	102	54	+48	77	
6	Kirriemuir Thistle	38	22	5	11	84	72	+12	71	
7	East Craigie	38	20	7	11	96	49	+47	67	
8	Montrose Roselea	38	17	6	15	75	72	+3	57	
9	Tayport	38	16	8	14	72	61	+11	56	
10	Dundee St James	38	17	4	17	84	94	−10	55	
11	Dundee Violet	38	14	6	18	53	62	−9	48	
12	Letham	38	13	7	18	65	94	−29	46	
13	Scone Thistle	38	12	5	21	62	89	−27	41	
14	Blairgowrie	38	10	6	22	57	114	−57	36	
15	Lochee Harp	38	9	3	26	49	108	−59	30	
16	Brechin Victoria	38	8	5	25	31	86	−55	29	
17	Arbroath Victoria	38	6	10	22	48	121	−73	28	
18	Forfar West End	38	7	6	25	46	106	−60	27	
19	Coupar Angus	38	4	5	29	52	122	−70	17	
20	Forfar United	38	4	4	30	53	146	−93	16	

Rules for classification: 1) Points; 2) Goal difference; 3) Goals scored
(C) Champions

== Results ==
Home \ Away	ARB	BLA	BRE	BRO	CAR	COU	DOW	DNE	DSJ	DUV	ECR	FUN	FWE	KIR	LET	LHA	LOU	MON	SCO	TAY
Arbroath Victoria	—	2–1	1–0	0–1	1–1	3–0	1–7	0–6	1–4	1–1	1–1	1–1	2–2	0–10	0–0	1–2	1–9	1–0	0–6	1–4
Blairgowrie	2–4	—	1–1	1–5	2–6	1–6	2–6	0–6	1–3	0–3 (Note: The match initially finished 2–0 to Blairgowrie, but was later awarded 3–0 to Dundee Violet.)	2–2	6–2	3–0	4–3	0–6	3–2	0–9	0–1	0–3	1–1
Brechin Victoria	1–0	1–2	—	0–10	0–3	2–1	1–4	0–1	1–0	3–2	0–3	5–0 (Note: Match played at Station Park, Forfar, due to flooding caused by Storm Babet.)	0–3	0–1	2–1	1–1	0–2	0–2	0–1	0–2 (Note: Match played at Links Park, Montrose.)
Broughty Athletic	8–1	7–0	4–1	—	3–0	8–0	5–1	1–2	4–2	5–1	2–0	2–1	3–2	3–1	5–0	7–0	1–3	5–1	5–0	3–2
Carnoustie Panmure	3–0	6–1	2–1	1–1	—	3–0	1–5	4–0	2–4	4–1	0–1	3–2	4–0	1–2	6–0	3–2	1–1	3–2	4–1	2–1
Coupar Angus	3–2	2–2	1–2	3–6	0–1	—	1–3	1–2	2–3	0–5	2–3	4–4	1–1	0–1	2–2	2–1	0–6	2–4	1–3	1–4
Downfield	4–1	4–0	4–0	0–2	5–1	3–1	—	0–3	5–5	4–1	1–3	7–0	3–1	0–2 (Note: Match played at Station Park, Forfar.)	3–1	5–1	3–2	3–1	3–1	4–1
Dundee North End	5–1	3–0	6–0	2–3	2–1	6–0	1–0	—	5–1	1–0	2–1	6–1	6–0	3–1	4–0	6–0	5–0	2–2	5–1	5–0
Dundee St James	2–3	2–5	3–1	4–3	3–5	4–1	1–2	1–3	—	1–2	0–8	4–1	4–4	0–3	1–2	3–2	0–3	5–2	4–1	2–0
Dundee Violet	0–0	2–1	2–1	0–3	0–2	1–0	0–5	0–3	0–1	—	2–3	2–0	1–0	2–2	3–1	6–0	1–1	1–2	2–0	0–1
East Craigie	3–2	3–0	1–1	0–1	2–5	4–0	0–1	0–3	0–2	1–1	—	5–1	2–1	5–0	1–3	3–0	2–2	3–0	0–2	0–1
Forfar United	4–2	1–5	2–0	0–5	1–6	2–4	3–5	0–6	1–1	1–0	0–8	—	0–2	3–5	2–4	0–1	1–5	3–5	3–1	2–5
Forfar West End	4–1	0–2	0–3	0–6	2–4	2–1 (Note: Match played at Station Park, Forfar.)	2–4	0–10	1–5	1–2	0–4 (Note: Match played at Station Park, Forfar.)	4–1	—	0–2	2–3	3–0	0–3	1–1	1–1	0–0
Kirriemuir Thistle	2–0	3–3	4–1	1–3	1–2	3–1	0–4	0–2	2–2	2–1	2–6	4–2	3–0	—	3–2	4–1	1–5	3–2	3–2	1–0
Letham	3–3	2–0	1–1	1–5	1–0	3–3	0–3	2–3	0–2	3–0	0–2	3–2	5–2	1–1	—	2–1	1–6	2–1	2–2	2–3
Lochee Harp	3–3	0–2	1–0	1–2	0–1	4–3	0–6	1–4	1–2	2–3	4–6	2–1	5–1	2–2	2–1	—	0–2	0–2	1–3	0–7
Lochee United	6–2	3–0	5–0	0–3	1–1	8–0	5–3	2–2	2–0	3–0	3–2	9–1	5–0	7–0	10–0	2–0	—	2–2	4–1	2–1
Montrose Roselea	2–2	1–1	4–0	1–2	2–1 (Note: Match played at Broomfield Park, due to a clashing Scottish League One fixture for Montrose at Links Park.)	4–1	1–4	0–4	3–0	1–0 (Note: Match played at Broomfield Park, due to a clashing Scottish League One fixture for Montrose at Links Park.)	1–7	1–1	4–1	1–3	4–0	6–1	2–4	—	2–1	2–1 (Note: Match played at Broomfield Park, due to a clashing Scottish Cup third round fixture for Montrose at Links Park.)
Scone Thistle	7–2	0–2	4–0	0–3	1–7	3–2	2–1	0–3	5–1	0–2	1–1	4–2	0–3 (Note: Match awarded to Forfar West End, following a protest of the original match result – which was an abandonment with 81 minutes played (1–2).)	1–2	1–3	0–3	0–7	0–2	—	2–2
Tayport	3–1	3–1	1–1	1–3	2–2	3–0	0–3	1–2	7–2	3–3	0–0	4–1	2–0	0–1	3–2	0–2	0–5	2–1	1–1	—

Legend: Blue = home team win; Yellow = draw; Red = away team win.

== Notes ==
^{SFA} Club with an SFA licence eligible to participate in the Highland League promotion play-off should they win the league.
