= 2020–21 East Premiership =

McBookie.com East Premiership
- Season: 2020–21
- Dates: 21 November 2020 – 16 March 2021 (abandoned)

The 2020–21 East Premiership (known as the McBookie.com East Premiership for sponsorship reasons) was the 19th season of league competition for SJFA East Region member clubs. This was effectively a continuation of the East Superleague but with fewer member clubs in the East Region all teams were in a single tier with no promotion or relegation.

The league was renamed to East Premiership and was split into North and South regional divisions, containing 17 and 13 teams respectively. The winners of each division were due to play each other in a play-off to determine the overall champion. The start of the league season was delayed until November 2020 because of the COVID-19 pandemic, and games were played behind closed doors due to Scottish Government restrictions. Lochee United continued as the reigning champions due to the previous season being declared null and void.

On 7 January 2021 the East Region chose to suspend the season until 6 February, due to new restrictions in place because of the rising number of COVID-19 cases. On 16 March the Scottish Junior Football Association's management committee ended the season declared all competitions null and void for a second successive season.

== Teams ==
The following teams changed division after the 2019–20 season.

=== To East Superleague ===
Promoted from East Premier League North

- Arbroath Victoria
- Blairgowrie
- Brechin Victoria
- Coupar Angus
- Dundee Violet
- East Craigie
- Forfar United
- Lochee Harp

Promoted from East Premier League South

- Bo'ness United Junior
- Linlithgow Rose Community
- Sauchie Juniors Community
- Stoneyburn
- Syngenta
- West Calder United

=== From East Superleague ===
Transferred to East of Scotland League

- Luncarty
- Kennoway Star Hearts
- Lochore Welfare
- Thornton Hibs

== North ==
McBookie.com East Region Premiership North
- Season: 2020–21
- Dates: 21 November 2020 – 16 March 2021
- Matches: 33
- Goals: 152 (4.61 per match)
- Biggest home win: East Craigie 12–0 Coupar Angus; (21 November 2020)
- Biggest away win: Coupar Angus 0–11 Lochee United; (28 November 2020)
- Highest scoring: East Craigie 12–0 Coupar Angus; (21 November 2020)
- Longest winning run: 5 matches: Lochee United
- Longest unbeaten run: 5 matches: Lochee United
- Longest winless run: 5 matches: Lochee Harp
- Longest losing run: 5 matches: Lochee Harp
- All statistics correct as of 19 December 2020.

=== Stadia and locations ===
Club	Location	Home Ground	Capacity	Seats	Floodlit	Finishing position 2018–19
Arbroath Victoria	Arbroath	Ogilvy Park	4,000	0	Yes	10th in Premier League North
Blairgowrie	Blairgowrie	Davie Park	2,500	0	No	8th in Premier League North
Brechin Victoria	Brechin	Victoria Park	600	100	Yes	9th in Premier League North
Broughty Athletic	Dundee	Whitton Park	2,500	0	Yes	2nd
Carnoustie Panmure	Carnoustie	Laing Park	1,500	0	No	7th
Coupar Angus	Coupar Angus	Foxhall Park	1,800	0	Yes	12th in Premier League North
Downfield	Dundee	Downfield Park	2,500	13	Yes	11th
Dundee North End	Dundee	North End Park	2,000	0	Yes	1st in Premier League North
Dundee Violet	Dundee	Glenesk Park	2,000	0	No	6th in Premier League North
East Craigie	Dundee	Craigie Park	3,300	0	No	5th in Premier League North
Forfar United	Forfar	Guthrie Park	2,500	0	No	11th in Premier League North
Forfar West End	Forfar	Strathmore Park	2,500	0	No	6th
Kirriemuir Thistle	Kirriemuir	Westview Park	2,000	32	Yes	9th
Lochee Harp	Dundee	Downfield Park	2,500	13	Yes	7th in Premier League North
Lochee United	Dundee	Thomson Park	3,200	0	No	1st
Scone Thistle	Scone	Farquharson Park	1,000	0	No	4th in Premier League North
Tayport	Tayport	Canniepairt	2,000	0	No	5th

=== League table ===
Pos	Team	Pld	W	D	L	GF	GA	GD	Pts	
1	Lochee United	5	5	0	0	22	2	+20	15	All clubs transferred to the Midlands League
2	Tayport	4	4	0	0	14	2	+12	12	
3	Broughty Athletic	5	4	0	1	14	6	+8	12	
4	East Craigie	4	3	0	1	24	4	+20	9	
5	Carnoustie Panmure	4	3	0	1	20	7	+13	9	
6	Arbroath Victoria	3	3	0	0	12	2	+10	9	
7	Downfield	3	2	1	0	5	2	+3	7	
8	Brechin Victoria	5	1	2	2	8	15	−7	5	
9	Dundee Violet	3	1	1	1	4	5	−1	4	
10	Forfar West End	4	1	1	2	5	9	−4	4	
11	Forfar United	5	1	1	3	8	13	−5	4	
12	Kirriemuir Thistle	4	1	0	3	6	8	−2	3	
13	Dundee North End	3	0	2	1	4	6	−2	2	
14	Blairgowrie	4	0	0	4	3	10	−7	0	
15	Scone Thistle	3	0	0	3	1	16	−15	0	
16	Lochee Harp	5	0	0	5	2	22	−20	0	
17	Coupar Angus	2	0	0	2	0	23	−23	0	

Updated to match(es) played on 19 December 2020. Source: SJFA
Rules for classification: 1) Points; 2) Goal difference; 3) Goals scored

=== Results ===
Each team was due to play every other team once, for a total of 16 fixtures.

Home \ Away	ARB	BLA	BRE	BRO	CAR	COU	DOW	DNE	DUV	ECR	FWE	FUN	KIR	LHA	LOU	SCO	TAY
Arbroath Victoria													4–1	5–0			
Blairgowrie							0–1										0–1
Brechin Victoria		5–2		0–3				2–2									
Broughty Athletic		3–1					1–3		2–0								
Carnoustie Panmure												2–5				10–0	
Coupar Angus															0–11		
Downfield			1–1														
Dundee North End									1–1								
Dundee Violet												3–2					
East Craigie						12–0						4–0					1–3
Forfar West End				2–5										1–0			
Forfar United											1–1				0–3		
Kirriemuir Thistle					1–2											3–0	
Lochee Harp					1–6					1–7							
Lochee United								3–1					2–1	3–0			
Scone Thistle	1–3																
Tayport			7–0								3–1						

Updated to match(es) played on 19 December 2020. Source: SJFA
Legend: Blue = home team win; Yellow = draw; Red = away team win.

== South ==
McBookie.com East Region Premiership South
- Season: 2020–21
- Dates: 21 November 2020 – 16 March 2021
- Matches: 15
- Goals: 67 (4.47 per match)
- Biggest home win: Syngenta 6–0 Sauchie Juniors Community; (21 November 2020)
- Biggest away win: Pumpherston 1–6 Syngenta; (28 November 2020)
- Highest scoring: Syngenta 5–3 West Calder United; (19 December 2020)
- Longest winning run: 2 matches: 3 teams
- Longest unbeaten run: 3 matches: Bo'ness United Junior & Syngenta
- Longest winless run: 3 matches: Bathgate Thistle & Sauchie Juniors Community
- Longest losing run: 3 matches: Bathgate Thistle & Sauchie Juniors Community
- All statistics correct as of 19 December 2020.

=== Stadia and locations ===
Club	Location	Home Ground	Capacity	Seats	Floodlit	Finishing position 2018–19
Armadale Thistle	Armadale	Volunteer Park	3,000	0	Yes	3rd in Premier League South
Bathgate Thistle	Bathgate	Creamery Park	3,000	0	Yes	4th in Premier League South
Bo'ness United Junior	Bo'ness	Newtown Park	2,500	0	Yes	n/a
Fauldhouse United	Fauldhouse	Park View	2,000	100	No	10th
Harthill Royal	Harthill	Gibbshill Park	1,800	0	No	6th in Premier League South
Livingston United	Livingston	Station Park	2,000	0	Yes	2nd in Premier League South
Pumpherston	Pumpherston	Recreation Park	2,700	0	No	1st in Premier League South
Sauchie Juniors Community	Sauchie	Beechwood Park	5,000	200	Yes	n/a
Stoneyburn	Stoneyburn	Beechwood Park	4,000	0	No	7th in Premier League South
Syngenta	Denny	Westfield Park				n/a
West Calder United	West Calder	Hermand Park	1,000	0	No	9th in Premier League South
Whitburn	Whitburn	Central Park	3,000	38	No	4th

==== Withdrew ====
Club	Location	Home Ground	Capacity	Seats	Floodlit	Finishing position 2018–19
Linlithgow Rose Community	Linlithgow	Xcite Linlithgow	500	0	Yes	n/a

=== League table ===
Pos	Team	Pld	W	D	L	GF	GA	GD	Pts	
1	Syngenta	5	3	1	1	19	7	+12	10	Resigned membership, joined East of Scotland League
2	Bo'ness United Junior	3	2	1	0	6	2	+4	7	Resigned membership, joined East of Scotland League
3	Armadale Thistle	2	2	0	0	8	2	+6	6	Resigned membership, joined East of Scotland League
4	Fauldhouse United	2	2	0	0	4	2	+2	6	Resigned membership, joined East of Scotland League
5	Livingston United	2	1	1	0	4	3	+1	4	Resigned membership, joined East of Scotland League
6	West Calder United	3	1	0	2	9	7	+2	3	Resigned membership, joined East of Scotland League
7	Whitburn Juniors	2	1	0	1	4	4	0	3	Resigned membership, joined East of Scotland League
8	Stoneyburn	2	0	2	0	4	4	0	2	Resigned membership, joined East of Scotland League
9	Pumpherston	2	0	1	1	4	9	−5	1	Resigned membership, joined East of Scotland League
10	Harthill Royal	1	0	0	1	1	6	−5	0	Resigned membership, joined West of Scotland League
11	Bathgate Thistle	3	0	0	3	1	9	−8	0	Resigned membership, joined East of Scotland League
12	Sauchie Juniors Community	3	0	0	3	3	12	−9	0	Resigned membership

Updated to match(es) played on 19 December 2020. Source: SJFA
Rules for classification: 1) Points; 2) Goal difference; 3) Goals scored

=== Results ===
Each team was due to play every other team twice, for a total of 22 fixtures.

Home \ Away	ARM	BAT	BUJ	FAU	HAR	LIV	PUM	SJC	STO	SYN	WCU	WHI
Armadale Thistle					6–1							
Bathgate Thistle				1–2								
Bo'ness United Junior		2–0										3–1
Fauldhouse United												
Harthill Royal												
Livingston United								3–2				
Pumpherston										1–6		
Sauchie Juniors Community												1–3
Stoneyburn						1–1	3–3					
Syngenta	1–2		1–1					6–0			5–3	
West Calder United		5–0		1–2								
Whitburn Juniors												

Updated to match(es) played on 19 December 2020. Source: SJFA
Legend: Blue = home team win; Yellow = draw; Red = away team win.
