= 2024–25 Midlands Football League =

Scottish football league season

Midlands Football League
- Season: 2024–25
- Dates: 2 August 2024 – 26 April 2025
- Champions: Dundee North End
- Matches: 280
- Goals: 1,145 (4.09 per match)
- Biggest home win: Broughty Athletic 10–0 Forfar West End (31 August 2024); Broughty Athletic 10–0 Dundee Violet (30 November 2024)
- Biggest away win: Forfar United 0–12 Dundee North End (2 August 2024)
- Highest scoring: Forfar United 0–12 Dundee North End (2 August 2024)
- Longest winning run: 19 matches: Dundee North End
- Longest unbeaten run: 26 matches: Dundee North End
- Longest winless run: 19 matches: Scone Thistle
- Longest losing run: 10 matches: Arbroath Victoria
- All statistics correct as of 26 April 2025.

The 2024–25 Midlands Football League was the 4th season of the Midlands Football League, part of the sixth tier of the Scottish football pyramid system.

Reigning champions Dundee North End and Broughty Athletic went into the final round of matches with a chance to win the championship - but, North End's 9–0 win over East Craigie gave them the title by 2 points, having gone 26 games unbeaten.

== Teams ==
Location of teams in the 2024–25 Midlands Football League
Location of teams in the 2024–25 Midlands Football League within Dundee
Location of teams in the 2024–25 Midlands Football League within Angus

=== Stadia and locations ===
Club	Location	Home Ground	Surface	Capacity	Seats	Floodlit
Arbroath Victoria	Arbroath	Ogilvy Park	Grass	1,000	0	No
Blairgowrie	Blairgowrie	Davie Park	Artificial	1,200	0	Yes
Brechin Victoria	Brechin	Victoria Park	Grass	800	100	No
Broughty Athletic	Dundee	Whitton Park	Artificial	1000	0	Yes
Carnoustie Panmure	Carnoustie	Laing Park	Grass	1,500	0	No
Coupar Angus	Coupar Angus	Foxhall Park	Grass	800	0	No
Downfield	Dundee	Downfield Park	Grass	2,000	13	No
Dundee North End	Dundee	North End Park	Grass	2,000	0	No
Dundee St James	Dundee	Fairfield Park	Grass	1,200	0	No
Dundee Violet	Dundee	Glenesk Park	Grass	1,500	0	No
East Craigie	Dundee	Craigie Park	Grass	2,000	0	No
Forfar United	Forfar	Guthrie Park	Grass	1,500	0	No
Forfar West End	Forfar	Strathmore Park	Grass	1,200	0	No
Kirriemuir Thistle	Kirriemuir	Westview Park	Grass	1,500	32	No
Letham	Perth	Seven Acres Park	Artificial	300	0	Yes
Lochee Harp	Dundee	New Beechwood Park	Artificial	500	0	Yes
Lochee United ^{[SFA]}	Dundee	Thomson Park	Grass	2,000	0	Yes
Montrose Roselea	Montrose	Links Park	Artificial	4,936	1,338	Yes
Scone Thistle	Scone	Farquharson Park	Grass	800	0	No
Tayport ^{[SFA]}	Tayport	Canniepairt	Grass	2,500	0	Yes

== League table ==
Pos	Team	Pld	W	D	L	GF	GA	GD	Pts	Qualification
1	Dundee North End (C)	28	25	2	1	113	17	+96	77	Ineligible for the Highland League play-off
2	Broughty Athletic	28	24	3	1	114	20	+94	75	
3	Downfield	28	23	1	4	92	29	+63	70	
4	Tayport	28	20	3	5	72	26	+46	63	
5	Lochee United	28	20	1	7	79	26	+53	61	
6	East Craigie	28	13	1	14	49	64	−15	40	
7	Carnoustie Panmure	28	11	4	13	60	61	−1	37	
8	Letham	28	11	4	13	56	67	−11	37	
9	Kirriemuir Thistle	28	10	2	16	38	57	−19	32	
10	Lochee Harp	28	9	5	14	38	71	−33	32	
11	Blairgowrie	28	14	4	10	79	61	+18	46	
12	Montrose Roselea	28	12	6	10	54	53	+1	42	
13	Dundee St James	28	8	8	12	46	60	−14	32	
14	Brechin Victoria	28	9	5	14	34	56	−22	32	
15	Forfar United	28	8	4	16	47	97	−50	28	
16	Forfar West End	28	8	1	19	37	76	−39	25	
17	Arbroath Victoria	28	7	2	19	40	77	−37	23	
18	Dundee Violet	28	6	4	18	25	76	−51	22	
19	Coupar Angus	28	5	5	18	41	61	−20	20	
20	Scone Thistle	28	3	3	22	31	90	−59	12	

Rules for classification: 1) Points; 2) Goal difference; 3) Goals scored
(C) Champions

== Results ==
In a change for the 2024–25 season, each team will play every other team once before the league splits into two groups of ten teams after nineteen games. In these groups, each team will play every other team once, for a total of 28 games.

=== Round-robin ===
Home \ Away	ARB	BLA	BRE	BRO	CAR	COU	DOW	DNE	DSJ	DUV	ECR	FUN	FWE	KIR	LET	LHA	LOU	MON	SCO	TAY
Arbroath Victoria		1–1	0–1	1–7	2–7			1–6			2–1	4–1		4–0					4–1	
Blairgowrie					3–3	3–1		3–5		7–2	1–1 (Note: Match played at Foxhall Park, Coupar Angus.)		2–1		1–2	1–2	2–6			
Brechin Victoria		1–4		2–4	0–1		0–4	1–2 (Note: Match played at Station Park, Forfar.)		1–2		0–2			1–5				2–0	0–2
Broughty Athletic		6–0				4–0		1–0		10–0	8–1		10–0	3–1			2–0		5–1	
Carnoustie Panmure				0–1		2–1			1–1	4–0		5–0	4–0	3–0		2–1	0–4			
Coupar Angus	3–1		1–1					3–6	0–1		3–0		1–3					1–2	3–2	1–4
Downfield	5–3	3–1		2–0	5–1	2–1					6–2		2–0				2–3		6–1	2–1
Dundee North End					1–0		3–0			3–0				3–0	5–1	7–0		7–0	9–0	3–1
Dundee St James	2–0	0–2	4–0	2–2			1–4	0–5				4–1			4–4		0–4			1–7
Dundee Violet	2–1					1–0	0–2		2–2					0–3	1–2	1–2	0–7	2–2	1–0	
East Craigie			5–1		2–6			2–3	1–0	1–0		5–0			1–0	4–1		1–4		
Forfar United		3–3		1–4		1–7	0–7 (Note: Match played at Station Park, Forfar.)	0–12		0–1					2–3	2–1	0–4	1–1		
Forfar West End	1–2		0–1					0–3	3–2	4–1	0–2	8–2		0–2			1–7	0–5		
Kirriemuir Thistle		4–3	2–0			3–1	0–4		3–0		0–1	4–4							1–0	2–2
Letham	5–0			1–3	4–3	2–1	2–1						6–1	1–2		1–2			2–2	1–3
Lochee Harp	4–2		2–0	0–4		2–1	1–3		0–4				3–1	2–1			0–4			0–3
Lochee United	4–0		2–0			3–1		1–2			3–1			2–0	5–0			3–0		0–1
Montrose Roselea	2–0	3–2	0–1	1–3	2–4		0–5		1–1					1–3 (Note: Match played at Gill Park.)	0–0 (Note: Match played at Gill Park.)	2–2				
Scone Thistle		2–7			2–5				2–3		0–3	1–3	1–3			3–3	0–4	0–5		
Tayport	2–0	6–1		2–2	2–0					4–0	2–0	1–0	7–1					3–2	5–0	

Legend: Blue = home team win; Yellow = draw; Red = away team win.

=== Top half ===
Home \ Away	BRO	CAR	DOW	DNE	ECR	KIR	LET	LHA	LOU	TAY
Broughty Athletic		6–1	2–1				5–0	5–0		3–0
Carnoustie Panmure			0–4	0–5	0–2		3–4			2–2
Downfield				0–0		3–2	5–2	6–0		
Dundee North End	2–2				9–0				1–0	
East Craigie	1–4		1–4			5–0			2–3	0–2
Kirriemuir Thistle	0–3	2–0		0–2			0–3	1–2	1–2	
Letham				0–4	2–3				0–3	
Lochee Harp		3–3		0–3	0–1		3–3			
Lochee United	0–5	2–0	2–3					1–1		
Tayport			0–1	1–2		3–1	3–0	2–1	1–0	

Legend: Blue = home team win; Yellow = draw; Red = away team win.

=== Bottom half ===
Home \ Away	ARB	BLA	BRE	COU	DSJ	DUV	FUN	FWE	MON	SCO
Arbroath Victoria				3–1	2–4	1–1		3–1	2–5	
Blairgowrie	5–0		1–3		3–2		7–2		2–0	5–0
Brechin Victoria	1–0			2–2	2–2			3–1	1–1	
Coupar Angus		1–4				1–1	1–4			
Dundee St James				1–1		1–0		0–0	2–3	0–2
Dundee Violet		1–3	2–3				1–2	1–0		
Forfar United	3–1		4–4		5–2			1–3		2–0
Forfar West End		0–2		0–3						3–0
Montrose Roselea				2–0 (Note: Match played at Gill Park.)		4–2	3–1 (Note: Match played at Gill Park.)	0–2		3–2 (Note: Match played at Gill Park.)
Scone Thistle	1–0		1–2	1–1		6–0				

Legend: Blue = home team win; Yellow = draw; Red = away team win.

== Notes ==
^{SFA} Club with an SFA licence eligible to participate in the Highland League promotion play-off, and also compete in the Scottish Cup.
