= Iain Jenkins =

Footballer (born 1972)

Personal information
- Full name: Iain Jenkins
- Date of birth: 24 November 1972 (age 53)
- Place of birth: Liverpool, England
- Height: 1.75 m (5 ft 9 in)
- Position: Full-back

Youth career
- 1984–1990: Everton

Senior career*
Years	Team	Apps	(Gls)
1991–1993	Everton	5	(0)
1992	→ Bradford City (loan)	6	(0)
1993–1998	Chester City	195	(1)
1998–2000	Dundee United	28	(1)
2000–2001	Shrewsbury Town	32	(0)
2001–2002	Chester City	6	(0)

International career
1997	Northern Ireland B	1	(0)
1997–1999	Northern Ireland	6	(0)

Managerial career
- 2006–2008: Dundee North End
- 2008–2009: Tayport
- * Club domestic league appearances and goals

Iain Jenkins (born 24 November 1972) is a football player and coach, who works for the Scottish Football Association (SFA) as an Elite Performance Coach. He began his playing career with Everton, from where he was loaned to Bradford City. He then went on to play for Chester City, Dundee United and Shrewsbury Town before retiring through injury after a second spell at Chester. Born in England, Jenkins was eligible to play for Northern Ireland, for whom he made six international appearances.

Jenkins has managed Scottish junior teams Dundee North End and Tayport, and has also had coaching roles with Chester City, Broughty Athletic, Cowdenbeath and St Mirren prior to joining the SFA.Iain currently has been named as part of St Johnstone F.C academy coaching staff in March 2026.

== Playing career ==
Born in Liverpool , Jenkins began his career with Everton and made five league appearances for the club. After a short loan spell at Bradford City, Jenkins moved to Chester City, where he would stay with the Blues five years. He recovered from a car accident in November 1995 to play again within five months and went on to often captain the side before leaving for Dundee United in March 1998. By this point, Jenkins was part of the Northern Ireland squad – making him Chester's first full international since Andy Holden more than a decade earlier.

Injuries restricted Jenkins to just 28 league appearances in two years for Dundee United. Following his release from United in 2000, Jenkins moved south to Shrewsbury Town and then back to Chester City, where he ended his playing career with a handful of appearances.

== Coaching career ==
Following his retirement, Jenkins became Chester youth coach, before moving to Scottish Junior Football Eastern Region North Division side Broughty Athletic in 2004. After a year there as coach, he became assistant manager at Dundee North End in June 2005, before becoming manager in June 2006. Shortly after leaving his post in May 2008, Jenkins was appointed manager of Tayport, leaving in August 2009 to become assistant manager at Cowdenbeath. winning back to back promotions with the Fife club.

After being offered the manager's job at Cowdenbeath following promotion success it was announced on 11 June 2010 that Jenkins had followed Danny Lennon to St Mirren as his assistant manager; he left the club amicably in July 2011. Since leaving St Mirren, Jenkins became a Scottish Football Association performance coach; as of 2012, he was the dedicated coach for the SFA Performance School project at St John's High School in Dundee. Iain also had a short spell as manager at Scottish junior outfit side Violet JFC in 2025. Iain has been named as part of St Johnstone FC academy outfit in March 2026.

== Personal life ==
As of January 2026, Jenkins was working as a surveyor.
