= Steven Fallon =

Scottish footballer and manager

Personal information
- Date of birth: 8 May 1979 (age 47)
- Place of birth: Paisley, Scotland
- Position: Defender

Team information
- Current team: Lochee United (manager)

Youth career
- 1994–95: Dundee United

Senior career*
Years	Team	Apps	(Gls)
1995–2001	Dundee United	0	(0)
2001	Stenhousemuir (loan)	3	(0)
2001–2002	Arbroath	3	(0)
2002–2004	Queen's Park	51	(0)
2004–2005	Stenhousemuir	24	(0)
2006–2008	Dundee North End		
2008	Tayport		
2008	St Andrews United		

Managerial career
- 2025–: Lochee United
- * Club domestic league appearances and goals

Steven Fallon (born 8 May 1979) is a Scottish retired footballer and coach who played as a defender in the Scottish Football League for Stenhousemuir, Arbroath and Queen's Park. He is currently the manager of Lochee United.

== Career ==
Steven Fallon was born in Paisley and began his career as a youth player with Dundee United, turning professional in July 1995. His six-year spell with the club was disrupted by injuries; he failed to make a competitive first team appearance, although he did appear in friendly matches and was an unused substitute for a UEFA Cup tie against CE Principat in July 1997. He spent the last few months of his Dundee United career on loan at Stenhousemuir, playing three times. Following his release in May 2001, Fallon signed for Arbroath, featuring in only a handful of matches after spending much of the season injured. He left Arbroath in 2002 and joined Queen's Park, where he would appear in over fifty league games over a two-year period.

In 2004, Fallon returned to Stenhousemuir for a year, featuring in most of the league campaign. He left the club in 2005 and signed for junior club Dundee North End. In 2008, Fallon joined Tayport before signing for St Andrews United in October of that year.

On 7 March 2018, Fallon become assistant manager at Broughty Athletic.

Since then, Fallon has been coaching at St Andrews United and at Forfar Athletic.
