= Lewis Toshney =

Scottish footballer (born 1992)

Personal information
- Date of birth: 26 April 1992 (age 34)
- Place of birth: Dundee, Scotland
- Positions: Right-back; centre-back

Team information
- Current team: Dundee North End (co-manager)

Youth career
- –2011: Celtic

Senior career*
Years	Team	Apps	(Gls)
2011–2014	Celtic	1	(0)
2012	→ Kilmarnock (loan)	12	(0)
2012–2013	→ Dundee (loan)	23	(0)
2014–2015	Ross County	9	(0)
2015	Cowdenbeath	13	(1)
2015–2016	Raith Rovers	31	(2)
2016–2019	Dundee United	24	(0)
2018	→ Arbroath (loan)	0	(0)
2019	→ Brechin City (loan)	10	(1)
2019	Falkirk	8	(0)
2020–2021	Inverness Caledonian Thistle	3	(0)
2021	Edinburgh City	6	(0)
2021–2022	Downfield		
2022–	Dundee North End		

International career^{‡}
2008	Scotland U17	2	(0)
2011	Scotland U19	2	(0)
2012–2013	Scotland U21	5	(1)

Managerial career
- 2021: Downfield
- 2022–: Dundee North End (co-manager)
- * Club domestic league appearances and goals as of 29 November 2021 ‡ National team caps and goals as of 25 March 2013

Lewis Toshney (born 26 April 1992) is a Scottish professional footballer and coach, who is the co-manager of Midlands Premier League club Dundee North End. Toshney has previously played for Celtic, Ross County, Cowdenbeath, Raith Rovers, Kilmarnock, Brechin City, Dundee United, Dundee, Falkirk, Inverness Caledonian Thistle, Edinburgh City and Downfield. He represented Scotland at youth international levels up to and including the Scotland under-21 team.

== Playing career ==
=== Celtic ===
Toshney made his debut for Celtic on 1 February 2011, coming on as a substitute for Scott Brown in a 3–0 league win over Aberdeen.

==== Kilmarnock (loan) ====
Toshney was loaned to Kilmarnock in January 2012. He made his debut on 7 February, in a 1–1 draw against Dunfermline in which he played the full 90 minutes. Four days later, Toshney made his second appearance, in a 1–1 draw with Hearts. His header from a corner was blocked on the line before Paul Heffernan put it in the back of the net. The next week Toshney started in his third match in a row, this time against Celtic's Old Firm rivals Rangers at Ibrox Stadium. Dean Shiels scored the only goal of the match as Kilmarnock won 1–0. Kilmarnock's next match was against Dundee United, and Toshney started again. However, after Liam Kelly received a red card, the match turned out badly for Kilmarnock who went on to concede four goals. Toshney missed Kilmarnock's next two matches due to a groin strain. After his return, manager Kenny Shiels was unsure whether to put him back on the team because he would be ineligible for the subsequent match, which was the 2012 Scottish League Cup Final, against parent club Celtic. Shiels did decide to start Toshney in the match, which was a 1–1 draw against Inverness Caledonian Thistle Kimarnock went on to win the League Cup by beating Celtic 1–0.

==== Dundee (loan) ====
On 24 August 2012, Toshney signed for newly promoted Scottish Premier League side Dundee on a season-long loan. Toshney played regularly for the club that season, but was unable to prevent them finishing bottom and being relegated. Dundee enjoyed more success in the Scottish Cup, reaching the quarter-finals where they lost narrowly to rivals Dundee Utd. It was during this cup run though that Toshney scored his first senior goal, Dundee's second in a 5–1 win over Morton in the fifth round. The young defender was praised for his performances at Dens Park by new manager John Brown, who stated "This season has been a steep learning curve for him. He hadn't played a lot of senior football prior to coming here but he's more than proven he's of SPL quality. Lewis has a bright future in the game." Toshney returned to Celtic in the summer of 2013 after his season loan at Dundee.

=== Ross County ===
After leaving Celtic in the summer of 2014, Toshney spent time on trial at Hearts and Hibs.

On 27 September 2014, Toshney signed for Ross County and made his debut the same day as they beat Dundee 2–1.

=== Cowdenbeath ===
Having been released by Ross County, Toshney signed for Cowdenbeath on 3 February 2015, signing a contract until the end of the 2014–15 season.

=== Raith Rovers ===
On 11 June 2015, Toshney signed for Raith Rovers.

=== Dundee United ===
Following his move to Scottish Championship rivals Dundee United, former Raith Rovers manager Ray McKinnon expressed an interest in bringing Toshney to Tannadice. Raith rejected three bids from United, eventually accepting the fourth for an undisclosed five-figure fee. On 28 June 2016, Toshney signed a three-year contract with Dundee United.

Toshney suffered a knee injury in October 2017 and didn't play in the first team for the rest of the 2017–18 season. In July 2018 he joined League One team Arbroath on loan until January 2019. United boss Csaba Laszlo stated that the club had let him go on loan as he wanted to play again. However Toshney's injury reoccurred in his first match for Arbroath and the loan deal was terminated as a result. Laszlo promised that United would continue to support Toshney.

Toshney moved on loan to Brechin City in January 2019.

== Coaching career ==
=== Downfield ===
After stints with Falkirk and Inverness Caledonian Thistle, Toshney announced his retirement from playing football in April 2021. He also said that he had accepted the role as manager of Dundee-based club Downfield. He reversed his decision to retire in July 2021, and signed for Scottish League Two side Edinburgh City. In November 2021, Toshney would return to Downfield, but would do so this time as a player rather than manager.

=== Dundee North End ===
In October 2022, Toshney joined Dundee North End as a player/co-manager alongside Kevin McNaughton. Under McNaughton and Toshney, North End won the Quest Engineering Cup in 2023. Going one further the following season, McNaughton and Toshney led the Dokens to the 2023–24 Midlands League title. The title win qualified North End for the 2024–25 Scottish Cup, and led the club in its first ever Scottish Cup campaign to the third round before being defeated in a close-fought match against Scottish Championship side Airdrieonians at a sold-out North End Park.

== International career ==
Toshney made his under-17 debut in a 3–2 loss against France in October 2008, he then played in Scotland's 3–1 victory over Slovakia, a month later. Toshney made his debut for the Scotland national under-21 football team in April 2012. Toshney scored his first goal for the Scotland under-21s in a 3–0 win versus Luxembourg on 25 March 2013 to make the game 3–0.

== Career statistics ==
As of match played 4 November 2017

Appearances and goals by club, season and competition
Club	Season	League			Scottish Cup		League Cup		Other		Total	
Club	Season	Division	Apps	Goals	Apps	Goals	Apps	Goals	Apps	Goals	Apps	Goals
Celtic	2010–11	Premier League	1	0	0	0	0	0	0	0	1	0
Celtic	2011–12	Premier League	0	0	0	0	0	0	0	0	0	0
Celtic	2012–13	Premier League	0	0	0	0	0	0	0	0	0	0
Celtic	2013–14	Premiership	0	0	0	0	0	0	0	0	0	0
Celtic	Celtic total		1	0	0	0	0	0	0	0	1	0
Kilmarnock (loan)	2011–12	Premier League	12	0	0	0	0	0	—		12	0
Dundee (loan)	2012–13	Premier League	23	0	3	1	0	0	—		26	1
Ross County	2014–15	Premiership	9	0	0	0	0	0	—		9	0
Cowdenbeath	2014–15	Championship	13	1	0	0	0	0	0	0	13	1
Raith Rovers	2015–16	Championship	31	2	0	0	2	0	3 (Note: One appearance in the Scottish Challenge Cup and two in the Premiership play-offs)	0	36	2
Dundee United	2016–17	Championship	20	0	1	0	6	1	2 (Note: Appearances in the Scottish Challenge Cup)	0	29	1
Dundee United	2017–18	Championship	4	0	0	0	5	0	1	0	10	0
Dundee United	Dundee United total		24	0	1	0	11	1	3	0	39	1
Career total			113	3	4	1	13	1	6	0	136	5

== Honours ==
=== Player ===
Dundee United

- Scottish Challenge Cup: 2016–17

=== Manager ===
Dundee North End

- North-Tayside Inter Regional Cup: 2022–23
- SJFA Midlands League: 2023–24
