= Kinnoull F.C. =

Association football club in Scotland

Kinnoull
- Full name: Kinnoull Football Club
- Nickname: The 'Noull
- Founded: 1943
- Ground: Tulloch Park, Tulloch Road, Perth
- Capacity: 1,200
- Coordinates: 56°24′28″N 3°27′29″W
- President: Gail Hamilton
- Manager: Alan Cameron
- League: East of Scotland League First Division
- 2025–26: East of Scotland League Second Division, 4th of 15 (promoted)
- Website: https://www.kinnoullfc.co.uk/
Home colours	Away colours

Kinnoull Football Club are a Scottish football club based in the Tulloch area of Perth. Formed in 1943, they play their home games at Tulloch Park and their team colours are red with a white trim. They currently play in the East of Scotland League First Division, having moved from the Junior leagues in 2018.

The club won the Tayside Premier Division in season 2005–06 and gained promotion to the East Super League for the 2006–07 season. However they only spent one season in the top tier before being relegated.

Kinnoull are one of four senior football clubs based in Perth, the others being professional side St Johnstone, East of Scotland Football League club Jeanfield Swifts and Letham of the Midlands League.

== Notable former players ==
- Paul Deas
- Jim Weir

== Honours ==
- East Region Tayside Premier winners: 2005–06
- East Region Central Division winners: 2012–13
- Tayside Premier Division winners: 1982–83, 1983–84
- Tayside Division One winners: 1980–81, 1988–89
- King Cup winners: 2025–26
- Currie (Findlay & Co) Cup: 1928–29, 1969–70, 1984–85
- Division One Rosebank Car Centre Cup: 2001–02
- Division One (Downfield SC Cup) winners: 1988–89
- Tayside Drybrough Cup: 1984–85
- Tayside Regional Cup: 1984–85
- Perthshire Junior Consolation Cup: 1965–66
- Craig Stephen Cup: 1983–84
