= Arbroath Sporting Club =

Former association football club in Angus, Scotland

- Full name: Arbroath Sporting Club
- Founded: 1960
- Dissolved: 2011
- Ground: Seaton Park
- Capacity: unknown
- League: SJFA East Region North Division
- 2009–10: 10th
Home colours

Arbroath Sporting Club (commonly known as Arbroath SC) were a Scottish junior football club based in Arbroath. Their home ground was Seaton Park and the club played in black and blue stripes.

Formed in 1960 as Angus Social Club, they played in the amateur and juvenile levels in the 1960s and early 1970s, with home games at the Low Common. They turned junior in the 1973, changed their name to Arbroath Sporting Club, and moved to their new home of Seaton Park. Seaton Park is now well known for car boot sales every Sunday in the summer months.

Up until the end of the 2005–06 season, they played in the Tayside Premier League of the Scottish Junior Football Association's Eastern Region.

The SJFA restructured prior to the 2006–07 season, and SC found themselves in the twelve-team East Region, North Division. They finished second in their first season in the division.

SC's arch-rivals were Arbroath Victoria.

Arbroath Sporting Club played their final ever game on 22 May 2011 in a 1–0 victory over Montrose Roselea.

Arbroath Sporting Club owing to a lack of committee members and financial pressures, at the Scottish Junior Football Association's AGM that year it was announced that they had withdrawn as members of the SJFA.

== Honours ==
Fife & Tayside Cup: 2006–07
