= 2025–26 Midlands Football League =

Midlands Football League
- Season: 2025–26
- Dates: 9 August 2025 – 3 June 2026

The 2025–26 Midlands Football League was the 5th season of the Midlands Football League, part of the Scottish football pyramid system. Dundee North End won the league for the third successive season, finishing eighteen points clear of their closest competitors.

== Background ==
A new league format for 2025–26 saw the league split into two divisions of ten clubs – named the Midlands Premier Division and Midland First Division – from the previous league set up of one singular division of 20 clubs.

From the 2026–27 season, a new Lowland Football League structure was announced to be introduced with two divisions each of 16 member clubs (plus any B teams) running concurrently known as Lowland League East and Lowland League West. As a result, the Midlands League moves to become a feeder of the Lowland League East; the 2025–26 season was a transitional season with up to three teams from the Premier Division promoted to the Lowland League East. Ultimately, only Lochee United were promoted, with Broughty Athletic and Tayport remaining in the Midlands League.

== Premier Division ==
Midlands Premier Division
- Season: 2025–26
- Dates: 9 August 2025 – 3 June 2026
- Champions: Dundee North End
- Promoted: Lochee United
- Matches: 180
- Goals: 800 (4.44 per match)
- Biggest home win: Lochee United 10–1 Letham (6 August 2025); Dundee North End 9–0 Letham (28 February 2026); Dundee North End 10–1 East Craigie (3 June 2026)
- Biggest away win: Letham 0–9 Dundee North End (12 November 2025); Lochee Harp 0–9 Tayport (14 February 2026)
- Highest scoring: Letham 3–10 Tayport (11 March 2026)
- Longest winning run: 15 matches: Dundee North End
- Longest unbeaten run: 23 matches: Broughty Athletic
- Longest winless run: 31 matches: Letham
- Longest losing run: 24 matches: Letham
- All statistics correct as of 3 June 2026.

The Premier Division was formed from the 10 clubs that finished in the top half of the 2024–25 Midlands Football League. Dundee North End won the title for the third successive season, sealing the title on 6 May 2026 with a 2–0 win over Tayport; they were ineligible for promotion to the Lowland League East as they do not hold an SFA club licence.

=== Stadia and locations ===
Club	Location	Home Ground	Capacity	Floodlit
Broughty Athletic ^{[SFA]}	Broughty Ferry, Dundee	Whitton Park	1,000	Yes
Carnoustie Panmure	Carnoustie	Laing Park	1,500	No
Downfield	Downfield, Dundee	Downfield Park	2,000	No
Dundee North End	Fairfield, Dundee	North End Park	2,000	No
East Craigie	Craigie, Dundee	Craigie Park	2,000	No
Kirriemuir Thistle	Kirriemuir	Westview Park	1,500	No
Letham	Perth	Seven Acres	300	Yes
Lochee Harp	Lochee, Dundee	New Beechwood Park	500	Yes
Lochee United ^{[SFA]}	Dryburgh, Dundee	Thomson Park	2,000	Yes
Tayport ^{[SFA]}	Tayport	The Canniepairt	2,500	Yes

=== League table ===
Pos	Team	Pld	W	D	L	GF	GA	GD	Pts	Promotion, qualification or relegation
1	Dundee North End (C)	36	30	2	4	135	32	+103	92	
2	Broughty Athletic	36	23	5	8	104	52	+52	74	Declined promotion to Lowland League East
3	Downfield	36	23	3	10	102	62	+40	72	
4	Tayport	36	22	5	9	106	59	+47	71	Declined promotion to Lowland League East
5	Lochee United (P)	36	22	3	11	106	49	+57	69	Promotion to Lowland League East
6	Carnoustie Panmure	36	17	4	15	72	72	0	55	
7	East Craigie	36	8	8	20	58	108	−50	32	
8	Kirriemuir Thistle	36	9	3	24	47	91	−44	30	
9	Lochee Harp	36	6	4	26	33	113	−80	22	
10	Letham	36	1	1	34	37	162	−125	4	

Rules for classification: 1) Points; 2) Goal difference; 3) Goals scored
(C) Champions; (P) Promoted

== First Division ==
Midlands First Division
- Season: 2025–26
- Dates: 9 August 2025 – 9 May 2026
- Champions: Dundee Violet
- Matches: 180
- Goals: 662 (3.68 per match)
- Biggest home win: Blairgowrie 9–0 Scone Thistle (2 August 2025)
- Biggest away win: Forfar West End 2–8 Dundee Violet (8 November 2025)
- Highest scoring: Scone Thistle 6–4 Dundee St James (30 August 2025); Forfar West End 2–8 Dundee Violet (8 November 2025)
- Longest winning run: 8 matches: Blairgowrie
- Longest unbeaten run: 20 matches: Dundee Violet
- Longest winless run: 11 matches: Forfar West End
- Longest losing run: 6 matches: Brechin Victoria
- All statistics correct as of 9 May 2026.

The First Division was formed from the 10 clubs that finished in the bottom half of the 2024–25 Midlands Football League. Dundee Violet won the division, sealing the title with a 3–2 victory at home to Forfar United on 27 April 2026, which gave them an unassailable four-point lead over Blairgowrie, who had one game to play at the time.

=== Stadia and locations ===
Club	Location	Home Ground	Capacity	Floodlit
Arbroath Victoria	Arbroath	Ogilvy Park	1,000	No
Blairgowrie	Blairgowrie	Davie Park	1,200	Yes
Brechin Victoria	Brechin	Victoria Park	800	No
Coupar Angus	Coupar Angus	Foxhall Park	800	No
Dundee St James	Douglas, Dundee	Fairfield Park	1,200	No
Dundee Violet	Lochee, Dundee	Glenesk Park	1,500	No
Forfar United	Forfar	Guthrie Park	1,500	No
Forfar West End	Forfar	Strathmore Park	1,200	No
Montrose Roselea	Montrose	Links Park	4,936	Yes
Scone Thistle	Scone	Farquharson Park	800	No

=== League table ===
Pos	Team	Pld	W	D	L	GF	GA	GD	Pts
1	Dundee Violet (C)	36	24	10	2	92	46	+46	82
2	Blairgowrie	36	21	5	10	65	46	+19	68
3	Forfar United	36	17	8	11	73	51	+22	59
4	Montrose Roselea	36	15	8	13	77	76	+1	53
5	Arbroath Victoria	36	15	6	15	68	65	+3	51
6	Dundee St James	36	12	7	17	64	69	−5	43
7	Coupar Angus	36	12	6	18	61	75	−14	42
8	Forfar West End	36	12	6	18	58	72	−14	42
9	Scone Thistle	36	9	7	20	61	93	−32	34
10	Brechin Victoria	36	8	7	21	43	69	−26	31

Rules for classification: 1) Points; 2) Goal difference; 3) Goals scored
(C) Champions

== Notes ==
^{SFA} Club with an SFA licence eligible for promotion to the Lowland League East, and also compete in the Scottish Cup.
