= Ally Gallacher =

Scottish football manager

Personal information
- Full name: Ally Gallacher
- Date of birth: 1909
- Place of birth: Scotland
- Date of death: 1964 (aged 54–55)

Managerial career
- Years: Team
- –1957: Carnoustie Panmure
- 1957: Dundee United

Ally Gallacher (1909–1964) was a Scottish football manager who briefly managed Dundee United in 1957.

== Career ==
Gallacher was manager of Tayside junior club Carnoustie Panmure when he accepted Dundee United manager Reggie Smith's offer to become assistant manager. When Smith left to join Falkirk in January 1957, Gallacher was appointed as a short-term replacement. In a seven-week spell, Gallacher oversaw a month which saw seven goals conceded in three consecutive matches within the same month. His resignation enabled him to concentrate on his other role as an employee of Taypools, which he had been instrumental in establishing. His son, Ken (1939–2003), became a leading journalist and chief football writer with The Glasgow Herald.

Preceded by Reg Smith	Dundee United manager 1957	Succeeded by Tommy Gray
