= Paul Deas =

Scottish footballer

Personal information
- Full name: Paul Andrew Deas
- Date of birth: 22 February 1972 (age 54)
- Place of birth: Perth, Scotland
- Position: Defender

Youth career
- 19??–1990: Kinnoull

Senior career*
Years	Team	Apps	(Gls)
1990–1995	St Johnstone	87	(2)
1995–1998	Stirling Albion	112	(0)
1998–2001	Livingston	93	(6)
2001–2002	Partick Thistle	25	(0)
2002–2003	Ross County	14	(0)
2003–2006	Brechin City	96	(0)
Total		327	(8)

International career
1992–1993	Scotland U21	2	(0)
- * Club domestic league appearances and goals

Paul Andrew Deas (born 22 February 1972) is a Scottish retired professional footballer.

A left-back, Deas began his career with Scottish Junior club Kinnoull before joining St Johnstone in 1990. In five years at McDiarmid Park he made 87 league appearances and scored two goals.

In 1995, he signed for Stirling Albion, with whom he remained for three years. He also went on to play for Livingston, Partick Thistle, Ross County and, most recently, Brechin City.

Deas represented the Scotland national under-21 football team.

== Personal life ==
He is the uncle of footballer Robbie Deas.

== Honours ==
Livingston

- Scottish First Division: 2000–01
