= Jimmy Sharp =

Scottish footballer

Personal information
- Date of birth: 11 October 1880
- Place of birth: Alyth, Perthshire, Scotland
- Date of death: 18 November 1949 (aged 69)
- Position: Left back

Senior career*
Years	Team	Apps	(Gls)
- East Craigie
1899–1904	Dundee	92	(5)
1904–1905	Fulham		
1905–1908	Woolwich Arsenal	103	(4)
1908–1909	Rangers	19	(0)
1909–1912	Fulham		
1912–1915	Chelsea	61	(0)
1915–1916	Dundee Hibernian		
1920	Fulham	1	(1)

International career
1902–1903	Scottish Football League XI	2	(0)
1904–1909	Scotland	5	(0)
- * Club domestic league appearances and goals

James Sharp (11 October 1880 – 18 November 1949) was a Scottish international footballer.

== Career ==
=== Club ===
Born in Alyth, Perthshire, Sharp began his career with East Craigie and then joined Dundee in 1899. There he was a regular at left back in his five seasons there, where he earned a Scottish First Division runners-up medal in 1902–03. In 1904 he moved south of the border to Fulham, who were then in the Southern League.

A year later, in 1905 he was snapped up by Woolwich Arsenal of the First Division and promptly became a regular in the side after making his debut against Liverpool on 2 September 1905. He missed only three league games in his first season and reached the FA Cup semi-finals twice in his first two seasons. Rangers prised him away in April 1908 for £400. In total he played 116 games for Arsenal, scoring 5 goals.

His spell at Rangers only lasted nine months before he moved back to London again, rejoining Fulham for a transfer fee of £1,000. He spent another four seasons at Craven Cottage. Sharp then joined Fulham's local rivals Chelsea, leaving upon the cancellation of league football in 1915 due to World War I.

Sharp then returned to Scotland, joining Dundee Hibernian of the wartime Eastern League in September 1915. He left in April 1916 for military service with the Black Watch, but briefly returned to play for Dundee Hibs in February 1919.

He moved back to Fulham in 1919, working as a trainer. However, at the age of 39 he made an unlikely comeback; after Fulham's inside left Harold Crockford missed the team bus to an away game at Bury on 17 April 1920, Sharp returned and scored in a 2–2 draw.

Sharp later coached at Walsall and Cliftonville. He died in 1949, aged 69.

=== International ===
Sharp made his debut for Scotland against Wales on 12 March 1904 while with Dundee. He won another three Scotland caps at Arsenal, and one more against Wales on 1 March 1909 during his Fulham spell, to bring his total to five.

== See also ==
- List of Scotland national football team captains
