= Midlands Football League =

Association football league in Scotland

- Founded: 2021
- Country: Scotland
- Confederation: UEFA
- Divisions: 2
- Number of clubs: 19
- Level on pyramid: 6
- Promotion to: Lowland Football League
- Domestic cup(s): Scottish Cup (SFA licensed clubs and league winners); North and Tayside Inter-Regional Cup
- League cup: Midlands League Cup
- Current champions: Dundee North End (3rd title) (2025–26)
- Most championships: Dundee North End (3 titles)
- Website: Midlands League
- Current: 2026–27 Midlands Football League

The Midlands Football League is a football league based in the Tayside area of Scotland. The league sits at levels 6 and 7 on the Scottish football league system, acting as a feeder to the Lowland Football League. Until 2025, the league was run by the East Region of the Scottish Junior Football Association.

Founded in 2021, the inaugural season was contested by 19 clubs, largely from those who still remained in the SJFA East Region from the previous season. Geographically, the league covers Angus, Perth and Kinross, Dundee and Fife (all East Region clubs based further south already having left the SJFA to join the East of Scotland Football League over the previous five years). In the summer of 2025, the league broke away from the SJFA to be an independent league operated by the Scottish Football Association and split into two divisions known as the Midlands Premier League and the Midlands First Division.

The winners previously took part in an end-of-season promotion play-off with the SJFA North Superleague and North Caledonian League champions for entry to the Highland League, subject to clubs meeting the required licensing criteria. However, due to the splitting of the Lowland League into the Lowland League East and Lowland League West for the season 2026–27, the Midlands League has now become a feeder for the Lowland League East rather than the Highland League.

== History ==
=== Background ===
The Tayside Junior Football League (originally named the Midlands League) had existed in the region since 1969. It was formed as one of the six new regions of the SJFA in part of a wider restructure of Scottish junior football, bringing several local junior leagues from the area together. It operated until 2002 when it merged with the Fife League and the East (Lothians) League to form a new larger East Region.

From 2017, most of the East Region clubs departed the junior ranks to join the senior East of Scotland League which was part of the pyramid with promotion to the Lowland League, including some former Tayside teams from Perthshire. By 2020, there were only 30 teams left in the East Region, which was restructured into two regional leagues of North and South. At the end of the season, all of the South teams (mostly from West Lothian) departed to join the senior ranks, leaving only the North teams (former Tayside Junior members) remaining which went on to join the pyramid system underneath the Highland League.

=== Formation ===
On 1 April 2021, the Scottish Junior Football Association stated their aim to establish a Midlands League for the 2021–22 season at Tier 6 of the Scottish football pyramid.

Although there was no official announcement of the league's formation, the SJFA East Region announced the fixtures for the 2021–22 season straight away on 21 June, with 19 clubs shown as league members, Dundee St James and Letham being new clubs in addition to all members of the 2020–21 East Premiership North.

On 5 July 2021, it was announced that subject to SFA approval, the Midlands league would be joined at Tier 6 by the SJFA North Superleague and North Caledonian League to form a fully-integrated level below the Highland League from 2021–22.

In February 2025, the SJFA announced that the SJFA East Region and SJFA North Region would split and form their own independent leagues under the Scottish Football Association, with the East Region maintaining the Midlands Football League and splitting it into two divisions, the Midlands Premier League and the Midlands First Division.

== Member clubs ==
Location of teams in the Midlands Football League
Location of teams in the Midlands Football League within Angus and Fife
Location of teams in the Midlands Football League within Dundee

=== Midlands Premier League ===
Club	Location	Home Ground	Capacity	Seats	Floodlit
Arbroath Victoria	Arbroath	Ogilvy Park	4,000	0	Yes
Blairgowrie	Blairgowrie	Davie Park	2,500	0	No
Broughty Athletic	Dundee	Whitton Park	2,500	0	Yes
Brechin Victoria	Brechin	Victoria Park	600	100	Yes
Carnoustie Panmure	Carnoustie	Laing Park	1,500	0	No
Coupar Angus	Coupar Angus	Foxhall Park	1,800	0	Yes
Downfield	Dundee	Downfield Park	2,500	13	Yes
Dundee St James	Dundee	Fairfield Park	TBC	0	No
Dundee North End	Dundee	North End Park	2,000	0	Yes
Dundee Violet	Dundee	Glenesk Park	2,000	0	No
East Craigie	Dundee	Craigie Park	3,300	0	No
Forfar United	Forfar	Guthrie Park	2,500	0	No
Forfar West End	Forfar	Strathmore Park	2,500	0	No
Kirriemuir Thistle	Kirriemuir	Westview Park	2,000	32	Yes
Letham	Perth	Seven Acres Park	TBC	0	Yes
Lochee Harp	Dundee	Lochee Community Sports Hub	TBC	0	Yes
Montrose Roselea	Montrose	Links Park	4,936	1,338	Yes
Scone Thistle	Scone	Farquharson Park	1,000	0	No
Tayport	Tayport	Canniepairt	2,000	0	Yes

== Seasons ==
Season	Champions	League Cup
2021–22	Carnoustie Panmure	Lochee United
2022–23	Carnoustie Panmure (2)	Carnoustie Panmure
2023–24	Dundee North End	Not Played
2024–25	Dundee North End (2)	Downfield
2025–26	Dundee North End (3)	Dundee North End

== Cup competitions ==
- East Region League Cup: Known as the Thorntons Property East Region League Cup under a sponsorship arrangement, this tournament was introduced for the 2018–19 season East Superleague to compensate for a reduced number of league fixtures.
  - Knock-out tournament for all clubs.
  - All matches played to a finish with penalties after 90 minutes, if required.
  - 2 rounds before Quarter-finals.
- North and Tayside Inter-Regional Cup: Known as the Signature Signs Cup for sponsorship purposes. First played for in 1988.
  - Knock-out tournament for all Midlands League and North Region clubs.
  - Clubs play early rounds in their own region with eight sides from each area progressing to the last sixteen.
