= Tayside Junior Football League =

Scottish football league

The Tayside Junior Football League, originally called the Midlands League, was a football league competition operated in Tayside under the Scottish Junior Football Association which operated as the top league in the territory from 1969 until a merger in 2002; it existed for a further four years as a second-tier league before the name was discontinued in 2006.

== History ==
Junior football had been played in the region since the 1890s, but it was not until a restructuring across Scotland in the late 1960s that all teams in the territory were brought together under one umbrella - previously they had been competing in the local leagues in Angus, Perthshire and Dundee, though the membership of these was not always rigidly dependent on geography, and another Midland League also existed from the 1920s to the 1940s involving clubs from all three territories. Due to predicted difficulties in arranging the new format, an extra year was requested for its completion by the local committees, and the Midland (Tayside) leagues began in 1969, a year after the rest of Scotland (the North was the only other of the six new regions which required more than minor adjustment to its structure).

With titles having been shared between clubs from Perthshire and Dundee (the sole Angus champions in 1974 being Kirrie Thistle), the league's balance altered dramatically in 1990 when Tayport joined the setup; their base was actually in the far north of Fife but they were permitted to join the Tayside league as they were closer to many of its teams via the Tay Road Bridge. The Port almost immediately began to dominate and did not finish outside the top two places from 1991 until 2002, when the Tayside leagues were merged with the Fife League and the East (Lothians) league to form a new Scottish Junior Football Association, East Region Superleague. Despite the challenge of facing the strongest clubs from these other two areas, Tayport continued to be among the leading teams for the first six years; Dundee side Lochee United also finished as East Region champions twice in that period. Tayside's setup was retained as a feeder division to the Superleague along with the other historic districts until 2006, when they were fully integrated into the East Region; Tayside's section (minus the Perthshire teams which were placed with the Fife sides) became the North Division below the Super League and a new Premier Division.

In 2018, a large group of East Junior clubs joined the East of Scotland Football League, aspiring to gain entry to the senior Scottish Professional Football League in future years; however, on Tayside the only ones to do so were the Perth teams Jeanfield Swifts and Kinnoull. This led to a North-South reorganisation of the remaining members of the region, with the 2019–20 Superleague North composed entirely of former Tayside clubs; it evolved into the Midlands Football League in 2021.

== Champions ==
Club also won the Scottish Junior Cup (doubles in **bold**).
Club were also runners-up in the Scottish Junior Cup.

Season	Winner	Runner-up (Note: Runners-up incomplete.)
1969–70	Blairgowrie	
1970–71	Blairgowrie	
1971–72	Blairgowrie	
1972–73	Jeanfield Swifts	
1973–74	Kirrie Thistle	
1974–75	Blairgowrie	
1975–76	Carnoustie Panmure	
1976–77	Carnoustie Panmure	
1977–78	Carnoustie Panmure	
1978–79	Carnoustie Panmure	Stobswell
1979–80	Lochee United	
1980–81	Carnoustie Panmure	Lochee United
1981–82	Lochee United	Arbroath Victoria
1982–83	Kinnoull	Carnoustie Panmure
1983–84	Kinnoull	
1984–85	Lochee Harp	
1985–86	Lochee Harp	Downfield
1986–87	Lochee United	Downfield
1987–88	Downfield	Forfar West End
1988–89	Downfield	Forfar West End
1989–90	Downfield	
1990–91	Forfar West End	Downfield
1991–92	Tayport	Downfield
1992–93	Tayport	Forfar West End
1993–94	Tayport	Downfield
1994–95	Tayport	Dundee St Joseph's
1995–96	**Tayport**	Downfield
1996–97	Dundee St Joseph's	Tayport
1997–98	Dundee North End	Tayport
1998–99	Tayport	Dundee North End
1999–2000	Tayport	Dundee North End
2000–01	Tayport	Carnoustie Panmure
2001–02	Tayport	Carnoustie Panmure

== List of winners ==
Club	Winner	Runner-up (Note: Runners-up incomplete.)	First win	Last win
Tayport	9	2	1991–92	2001–02
Carnoustie Panmure	5	3	1975–76	1980–81
Blairgowrie	4	0	1969–70	1974–75
Downfield	3	6	1987–88	1989–90
Lochee United	3	1	1979–80	1986–87
Kinnoull	2	0	1982–83	1983–84
Lochee Harp	2	0	1984–85	1985–86
Dundee North End	1	2	1997–98	
Forfar West End	1	3	1990–91	
Dundee St Joseph's	1	1	1996–97	
Kirrie Thistle	1	0	1973–74	
Jeanfield Swifts	1	0	1972–73	
Stobswell	0	1	N/A	
Arbroath Victoria	0	1	N/A	
