= Scottish Junior Football East Region Premier League North =

- Founded: 2002 (23 years ago)
- Folded: 2020
- Country: Scotland
- Number of clubs: 8
- Level on pyramid: 2
- Promotion to: East Super League
- Domestic cup(s): Scottish Junior Cup
- Last champions: None (2019-20)
- Website: East Region SJFA

The Scottish Junior Football East Region Premier League North also known for sponsorship reasons as the McBookie.com East Premier League North, was the second-tier division of the East Region of the Scottish Junior Football Association and sat parallel with the East Region Premier League South.

The league came into existence under the 'North' name for the 2006–07 season, although a 'Tayside District league' had been in place below the East Super League since 2002–03, using the structure of a common 'East Region' top tier and lower regional divisions in place of the old structure of three separate regional leagues in that part of Scotland, with the Tayside Junior Football League the historic local competition. The North Division was further expanded for 2013–14 season following league reconstruction in the East Region, by absorbing the more northerly clubs from the dissolved East Region Central Division.

Up until season 2017–18, there was a Premier League at tier 2 and North and South Divisions at tier 3. The large-scale movement of clubs to the East of Scotland Football League has resulted in the structure being flattened. Further league reconstruction for the 2019–20 season split the Super League into North and South divisions, reducing the number of Premier League North teams. It now comprises 8 clubs who each play each other home and away to give 28 league fixtures.

== Member clubs for the 2019–20 season ==
Location of teams in Scottish Junior Football East Region North Division (Perth and Kinross)
Location of teams in Scottish Junior Football East Region North Division (Angus)
Location of teams in Scottish Junior Football East Region North Division (Dundee)

Club	Location	Home Ground	Finishing position 2019-20 (Note: Season suspended in March 2020 due to the coronavirus pandemic, later officially declared null and void with no champion declared. Using 'points per game' algorithm applied in other leagues, East Craigie (who were also leading the league when play stopped) would have been nominal champions.)
Arbroath Victoria	Arbroath	Ogilvy Park	3rd
Blairgowrie	Blairgowrie	Davie Park	2nd
Brechin Victoria	Brechin	Victoria Park	5th
Coupar Angus	Coupar Angus	Foxhall Park	7th
Dundee Violet	Dundee	Glenesk Park	4th
East Craigie	Dundee	Craigie Park	1st
Forfar Albion	Forfar	Guthrie Park	8th
Lochee Harp	Dundee	Downfield Park	6th

== Winners ==
- As Tayside District, one of three third-tier divisions:
  - 2002–03: Lochee United
  - 2003–04: Carnoustie Panmure
  - 2004–05: Dundee North End
  - 2005–06: Kinnoull (Note: Kinnoull were promoted to the Super League. Runners-up Montrose Roselea were promoted to the new Premier League, along with Scone Thistle (3rd) and Lochee Harp (4th).)
- As East Region North, one of three third-tier divisions:
  - 2006–07: Forfar West End
  - 2007–08: Blairgowrie
  - 2008–09: Montrose Roselea
  - 2009–10: Broughty Athletic
  - 2010–11: Downfield
  - 2011–12: Dundee Violet
  - 2012–13: Kirriemuir Thistle
- As one of two third-tier divisions:
  - 2013–14: Dundee North End (2)
  - 2014–15: Thornton Hibernian
  - 2015–16: Downfield (2)
  - 2016–17: Kirriemuir Thistle (2)
  - 2017–18: Dundee North End (3)
- As one of two second-tier divisions:
  - 2018–19: Dundee North End (4)
  - 2019-20: No champion
