= Scone Thistle F.C. =

Association football club in Scotland

Scone Thistle
- Full name: Scone Thistle Football Club
- Nickname: Jaggy Nettles
- Founded: 1882
- Ground: Farquharson Park; Stormont Road; Scone
- Capacity: 1,500
- Coordinates: 56°25′25″N 3°24′16″W
- Chairman: Derek Adam
- Manager: Charlie King
- League: Midlands First Division
- 2025–26: Midlands First Division, 9th of 10
Home colours	Away colours

Scone Thistle Football Club are a Scottish junior football club based in Scone, Perth and Kinross. Their home ground is Farquharson Park and club colours are black and red.

== History ==
The club was founded in 1882 making it the third oldest football club in Perthshire and oldest Perthshire Junior football club. They played in the Perthshire Junior leagues up until the outbreak of World War II. In the early 1960s the Jags became members of the Perthshire Juvenile Football Association (Juvenile football in Scotland was football played by adult players up to the age of 27).

In August 1982, during Scone Thistle’s centenary, George Best played twenty minutes for the club against Scone Amateurs; the appearance fee he received helped to pay off an income tax bill.

The club were to remain in Juvenile football until 1983 as following the successful winning of the Scottish Juvenile Cup that year the club returned to the ranks of Junior football.

Up until the end of the 2005–06 season, they played in the Tayside Premier League of the Scottish Junior Football Association's Eastern Region where they won the Tayside JFA Division One title in season 1994–95, the East Region Tayside Division One in 2002–03 and the Tayside League Cup in 2005–06.

The SJFA restructured prior to the 2006–07 season, and Thistle found themselves in the twelve-team East Region Premier League. They were relegated to the East Region Central Division.

In April 2012 it was announced that Scone Thistle were returning to the Scottish Junior East Region League after they spent the 2011–12 season in abeyance.

== Management ==
- Manager – Charlie King
- Assistant – Gavin Sorely
- Physio - Angela Thomson
- First Aid – Eric Duff

== First-team squad ==
Note: Flags indicate national team as defined under FIFA eligibility rules; some limited exceptions apply. Players may hold more than one non-FIFA nationality.

No.	Pos.	Nation	Player
1	GK	SCO	Michael Patton
2	DF	SCO	James Wilkie
3	DF	SCO	Ross Loudon
4	DF	SCO	Lewis Finnie
5	DF	SCO	Cameron Forbes
6	DF	SCO	Jack Henderson
7	FW	SCO	Ben Ayton
8	MF	SCO	Scott Peebles
9	FW	SCO	Sean Hastie
10	MF	SCO	Kieran Forber
11	FW	SCO	Paul Leask

No.	Pos.	Nation	Player
12	MF	SCO	Owen Hepburn
13	GK	SCO	Sean Dalton
14	FW	SCO	Lewis Anderson
15	MF	SCO	Kalani Anderson
16	MF	SCO	Robbie Young
17	MF	SCO	Tom Allan
18	MF	SCO	Ryan Kinnear
19	MF	SCO	Ross Cameron
20	FW	SCO	Jake Grady
21	MF	SCO	Kairn Brand
22	MF	SCO	Cody Bateman
