= Lochee United F.C. =

Association football club in Dundee, Scotland

Lochee United
- Full name: Lochee United Football Club
- Nickname: The Blue Bells
- Founded: 1892
- Ground: Thomson Park; Napier Drive; Dundee
- Capacity: 3,200
- Coordinates: 56.4763°N 3.0203°W
- Chairman: Tom McMillan
- Manager: Steven Fallon
- League: Lowland League East
- 2025–26: Midlands Premier League, 5th of 10 (promoted)
- Website: https://www.locheeunited.co.uk/
| Home colours | Away colours |

Lochee United Football Club are a Scottish football club based in the Lochee area of Dundee. Formed in 1892, they currently compete in the Lowland League East and play their home games at Thomson Park.

== History ==
After spending their early years as a juvenile and amateur side, United joined the Junior grade in 1959. Their Thomson Park ground was opened by former Rangers and Scotland captain George Young in the same year.

Achieving notable local success in the late 1970s and 1980s, the club flourished again after the formation of the East Region Superleague in 2002. Under the management of Eddie Wolecki Black, United were promoted as Tayside Premier champions in 2003 and two seasons later, won their first Superleague title. In the same year, they also reached the final of the Scottish Junior Cup for the first, and so far, only time, losing 2–0 to local rivals Tayport at Tannadice Park.

Wolecki departed for Montrose in December 2005 but his successor as manager, former Dundee United midfielder Ray McKinnon, maintained the clubs' run of success, culminating in a second East Superleague title in 2007–08. This led to their participation in the Scottish Cup for the first time. United reached the third round of the competition after beating fellow Junior qualifier Bathgate Thistle 3–1 in the first round and Highland League side Buckie Thistle 3–0 in the second round. In the third round, Lochee held Second Division Ayr United to a 1–1 draw at home before going down 3–1 in the replay at Somerset Park.

They are one of two Junior clubs based in Lochee, the other being Lochee Harp.

Lochee won their third East Superleague title in 2018–19, making them eligible to enter the 2019–20 Scottish Cup at the Preliminary round stage.

In June 2022, the club announced that it had been successful in attaining an SFA licence, allowing them access to progress through the Scottish football league system and play in the Scottish Cup every season.

The team is managed by Steven Fallon, who took over from Dougie Cameron.

In 2026, Lochee were invited to join the new Lowland League East following league reconstruction.

== Honours ==
- Scottish Junior Cup
  - Runners-Up: 2004–05
- SJFA East Region Super League
  - Winners (3): 2004–05, 2007–08, 2018–19

=== Other Honours ===
- Tayside Premier Division winners: 1979–80, 1981–82, 1986–87
- Tayside Division One winners: 1993–94
- Dundee Junior League winners: 1968–69
- East Region Tayside Premier League: 2002–03
- East of Scotland Junior Cup: 2008–09, 2021–22
- North & Tayside Inter-Regional Cup: 2005–06, 2013–14, 2015–16, 2023–24
- Fife & Tayside Cup: 2003–04, 2005–06, 2007–08
- North End Challenge Cup: 2003–04
- Currie (Findlay & Co) Cup: 1976–77, 1986–87, 1999–00
- Intersport Cup: 1989–90
- Tayside Drybrough Cup: 1978–79, 1980–81, 1981–82
- Tayside Regional Cup: 1976–77, 1981–82
- Courier Cup: 1924–25, 1964–65, 1970–71
- Cream of the Barley Cup: 1978–79, 1981–82, 1984–85
- Redwood Leisure Cup: 2003–04, 2005–06, 2007–08
- DJ Laing League Cup: 2006–07, 2007–08, 2011–12, 2021–22
- Challenge Cup: 2003–04, 2005–06
- Dug Out Cup: 2005–06
- Salutations Cup: 2008–09
