= Forfar United F.C. =

Association football club in Angus, Scotland

Forfar United
- Full name: Forfar United Junior Football Club
- Nickname: United
- Founded: 1881 (as Forfar East End); 1974 (as Forfar Albion); 2020 (as Forfar United)
- Ground: Guthrie Park; Lochside Road; Forfar
- Capacity: 2,500
- Coordinates: 56°38′53″N 2°53′37″W
- Manager: Chris Kettles
- League: Midlands First Division
- 2025–26: Midlands First Division, 3rd of 10
Home colours	Away colours

Forfar United Junior Football Club are a Scottish football club based in Forfar, Angus. The current club was formed in August 2020 following the amalgamation of the Forfar amateur team Lowson United and Forfar Albion (themselves formed in 1974 following the amalgamation of two existing local sides, Forfar Celtic (est. 1891) and Forfar East End (est. 1881)). After one season playing as Forfar East End Celtic, the name Albion was adopted in 1975. The club play at Guthrie Park.

Up until the end of the 2005–06 season, they played in Tayside Division One of the Scottish Junior Football Association's Eastern Region.

The SJFA completed its restructuring of Junior football in the east of Scotland prior to the 2006–07 season, and Forfar Albion were placed in the twelve-team East Region, North Division. They finished ninth, 12th and 12th in seasons 2006–07, 2007–08 and 2008–09 respectively, but showed encouraging signs of improvement during the 2009–10 season.

Under the new name Forfar United, the club managed an 11th-place finish in the 2022–23 season, then embarked on a youthful rebuild from the 2024–25 season under the new management team of Connor Yeats, Akka Veli, Mark Caldwell, Fraser Reid (GK coach) and Ben Coutts (Physio).

== First-team squad ==
As of 12 September 2023

Note: Flags indicate national team as defined under FIFA eligibility rules; some limited exceptions apply. Players may hold more than one non-FIFA nationality.

No.	Pos.	Nation	Player
—	GK	SCO	Jack Shaw
—	DF	SCO	David Macauley
—	DF	SCO	jaws gordon
—	DF	SCO	Ben Ranstead
—	DF	NIR	Joel Nixon
—	DF	SCO	Bryn Thomson
—	DF	SCO	Aiden Crighton
—	DF	SCO	Rhys Garmany
—	MF	SCO	Kyle Buik
—	MF	SCO	Mitchell johnston
—	MF	SCO	Thomas Smith
—	MF	SCO	Jay MacDonald
—	MF	SCO	Evan Kidd
—	MF	SCO	Ross Bell
—	MF	ITA	Lawrence Williams (loan from Dundee St James F.C.)
—	MF	SCO	Jack Davie
—	FW	COL	Rene Rivera Diazgranados
—	FW	SCO	Owen Gray
—	FW	SCO	Cain Buchanan
—	FW	SCO	Connor Birse (C)
—	FW	SCO	Jay Yule
—	FW	NIG	Tobiloba Fasoranti
—	FW	SCO	Richie Low
—	FW	SCO	Aaron Mitchell
—	FW	SCO	Cameron Gauhl
—	FW	SCO	Cemi Gokalp
