= Blairgowrie F.C. =

Association football club in Scotland

Blairgowrie
- Full name: Blairgowrie Junior Football Club
- Nicknames: The Blair, The Berrypickers
- Founded: 1946
- Ground: Davie Park; Rattray; Blairgowrie
- Capacity: 2,500
- Coordinates: 56°35′25″N 3°19′39″W
- Manager: Mark Brash
- League: Midlands First Division
- 2025–26: Midlands First Division, 2nd of 10
Home colours	Away colours

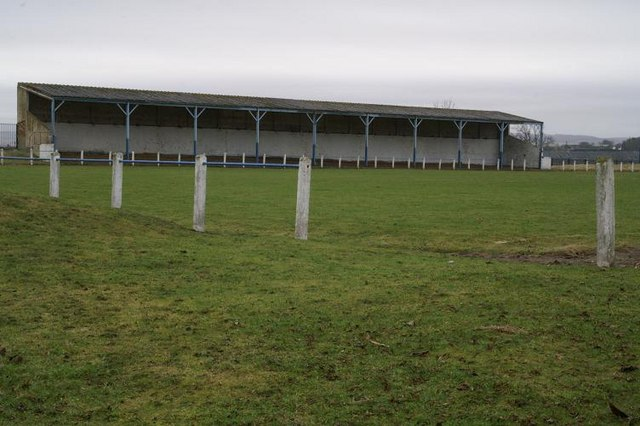
Davie Park, home of Blairgowrie F.C.

Blairgowrie Junior Football Club is a Scottish Junior football club based in Blairgowrie and Rattray, Perth and Kinross. Their home ground is Davie Park

Blairgowrie is amongst the most successful teams in Perthshire, having won ten Currie Cups, eight Perthshire Junior League Championships, and thirteen Perthshire Junior Cups between the time of formation in 1946 and the disbandment of the Perthshire League in 1969.

When the Perthshire, Angus, and Dundee leagues combined to form the Midlands League, Blairgowrie were the champions for three consecutive seasons (1969–70, 1970–71 and 1971–72). and won a fourth successive title in 1974–75.

Some 48 players have left Blairgowrie to become Senior footballers, and they include Charlie Thomson, Kenny Cameron, and Lindsay Kydd to name a few.

The club's record attendance is 5,200, which occurred during the 1958–59 Scottish Junior Cup quarter-final replay against the eventual winners Irvine Meadow.

Up until the end of the 2005–06 season, they played in Tayside Division One of the Scottish Junior Football Association's Eastern Region.

The SJFA restructured prior to the 2006–07 season, and Blairgowrie found themselves in the twelve-team East Region, North Division. They finished fourth in their first season in the division, and in 2007–08, won the league with a game to spare, beating Downfield 6–1 in their final home league fixture.

== Honours ==
SJFA East Region North Division

- Winners: 2007–08

=== Other honours ===
- Perthshire Junior League – 1951–52, 1952–53, 1957–58, 1958–59, 1959–60, 1960–61, 1961–62, 1968–69
- Perthshire Junior Cup – 1948–49, 1949–50, 1950–51, 1953–54, 1955–56 1956–57, 1957–58, 1958–59, 1959–60, 1962–63, 1968–69 1971–72
- Midlands (Tayside) League – 1969–70, 1970–71, 1971–72, 1974–75
- Tayside First Division – 2003–04
- Currie Cup – 1949–50, 1951–52,1952–53. 1955–56, 1956–57 1959–60, 1962–63, 1964–65,1965–66, 1974–75
- Perthshire Rosebowl – 1950–51, 1951–52, 1952–53, 1955–56, 1965–66
- Constitutional Cup – 1947–48, 1958–59, 1962–63
- PA Cup – 1952–53, 1955–56
- St. Johnstone YM Trophy – 1962–63, 1963–64, 1964–65
- Dryburgh Cup – 1973–74
- St. Andrews Fives – 1974–75
- Tayside Regional League Cup – 1975–76
- Doreen Winter Cup – 1986–87 1989–90
- Tayside Second Division – 1986–87
- Rosebank Car Centre Trophy – 1999–00
- Tay Land Rover Trophy – 2002–03
- Red House Hotel Trophy – 2003–04
- Fife & Tayside Cup: 2009–10
