= Carnoustie Panmure F.C. =

Association football club in Angus, Scotland

Carnoustie Panmure
- Full name: Carnoustie Panmure Football Club
- Nickname: The Gowfers
- Founded: 1936; 90 years ago
- Ground: Laing Park; Pitskelly Road; Carnoustie
- Coordinates: 56°30′9″N 2°43′59″W
- Manager: Dougie Cameron
- League: Midlands Premier League
- 2025–26: Midlands Premier League, 6th of 10
- Website: http://www.thegowfers.com/
Home colours	Away colours

Carnoustie Panmure Football Club are a Scottish Junior football club from the town of Carnoustie, Angus. They currently compete in the Midlands Premier League.

== History ==
Formed in 1936, they are nicknamed the Gowfers due to the town's well-established links to the sport of golf ("gowf" in Scots). They play at Laing Park, to which they moved in 2004, having previously played at Westfield Park.

The club received significant investment in the late 1990s, which has allowed them to emerge as one of the stronger Tayside clubs participating in the East Region. The pinnacle of their achievements was winning the Scottish Junior Cup in 2004.

The club has an academy with players aged 5–8yrs, a youth set up with teams from 9s to under-19s, two amateur teams using the Carnoustie YM name and four girls teams from Monifieth Ladies. In 2013 the club became a Scottish Charitable Incorporated Organisation to provide a pathway for players from Youth to Adult football and to improve sports facilities in the town. In 2013 the club had 350 players across 18 teams.

Carnoustie Panmure compete in the Midlands League in which they were back to back winners of the championship in its first two seasons, 2021–22 and 2022–23. They did not meet the licensing requirements to be promoted to the Highland League, their reward instead being entry to the senior Scottish Cup as an unlicensed club (in 2022–23 they won two ties before being eliminated in the Second round).

== Honours ==
Scottish Junior Cup

- Winners: 2003–04
- Runners-up: 2000–01

SJFA Midlands League

- Winners: 2021–22, 2022–23

=== Other honours ===
- East of Scotland Junior Cup: 2022–23
- Tayside Premier Division winners: 1975–76, 1976–77, 1977–78, 1978–79, 1980–81
- East Region Tayside Premier winners: 2003–04
- Tayside Division One winners: 1970–71, 1991–92
- Dundee Junior League winners: 1950–51, 1951–52, 1952–53, 1955–56, 1957–58, 1964–65, 1965–66
- Currie (Findlay & Co) Cup: 1971–72, 1975–76, 1977–78, 2002–03, 2006–07
- North End Challenge Cup: 2001–02, 2004–05, 2006–07, 2007–08
- DJ Laing Homes League Cup: 2000–01
- Intersport Cup: 1994–95
- Division One (Downfield SC Cup) winners: 1989–90
- Tayside Drybrough Cup: 1975–76, 1977–78
- Tayside Regional Cup: 1975–76, 1977–78
- Arbroath & District Cup: 1936–37
- Courier Cup: 1949–50, 1951–52, 1953–54
- Cream of the Barley Cup: 1977–78
- North & Tayside Inter-Regional Cup: 2017–18

== Notable former managers ==
- Phil McGuire
- Ally Gallacher
- Bobby Geddes
- George O'Boyle
