= Dundee North End F.C. =

Association football club in Scotland

Dundee North End
- Full name: Dundee North End Football Club
- Nickname: The Dokens
- Founded: 1895
- Ground: North End Park, Fairmuir Street, Dundee
- Capacity: 2,000
- Coordinates: 56°28′45″N 2°58′52″W
- Chairman: Gary Irons
- Manager: Kevin McNaughton
- League: Midlands Premier League
- 2025–26: Midlands Premier League, 1st of 10 (champions)
Home colours	Away colours

Dundee North End Football Club are a Scottish junior football club based in the city of Dundee. Formed in 1895 and nicknamed the Dokens, they play their home games at North End Park which has room for around 2,000 spectators and is within the vicinity of the grounds of both Dundee and Dundee United. Their strip (uniform) colours are maroon home kit and light blue away kit.

The team have been managed since October 2022 by former Cardiff City player Kevin McNaughton and former Dundee and Dundee United player Lewis Toshney. Under McNaughton and Toshney, North End won the Quest Engineering Cup in 2023. Going one further the following season, McNaughton and Toshney led the Dokens to the 2023–24 Midlands League title. The title win qualified North End for the 2024–25 Scottish Cup, and led the club in its first ever Scottish Cup campaign to the third round before being defeated in a close-fought match against Scottish Championship side Airdrieonians at a sold-out North End Park.

== First-team squad ==
Note: Flags indicate national team as defined under FIFA eligibility rules; some limited exceptions apply. Players may hold more than one non-FIFA nationality.

No.	Pos.	Nation	Player
—	GK	SCO	Sean Diamond
—	GK	SCO	Neal Ferrie
—	GK	SCO	Ross Matthews
—	DF	SCO	Tristan Baxter
—	DF	SCO	Luc Bollan
—	DF	SCO	Liam Gibb
—	DF	SCO	Ross Jamieson
—	DF	SCO	Sean Johnstone
—	DF	SCO	Lewis Kidd
—	DF	SCO	Brian Rice
—	DF	SCO	Chase Scott
—	DF	SCO	Kerr Waddell
—	MF	SCO	Cammy Blacklock
—	MF	SCO	Danny Clark
—	MF	SCO	Lewis Craik

No.	Pos.	Nation	Player
—	MF	SCO	Frankie Devine
—	MF	SCO	Cammy Dow
—	MF	SCO	Michael Gardyne
—	MF	SCO	Ryan McCord
—	MF	SCO	Jamie Montgomery
—	MF	SCO	Ryan Smith
—	MF	ENG	Archie Thomas
—	MF	SCO	Craig Thomson
—	MF	SCO	Ryan Winter
—	FW	SCO	Jordan Garden
—	FW	SCO	Bobby Linn
—	FW	SCO	Paul McLellan
—	FW	SCO	Kevin Milne
—	FW	SCO	Jaden Ferguson
—	FW	SCO	Paul Sludden

== Honours ==
- Midlands League winners: 2023–24, 2024–25, 2025–26
- SJFA East Region North Division winners: 2017–18, 2018–2019
- North & Tayside Inter-Regional Cup: 2000–01, 2010–11, 2022–23, 2025–26
- Midlands League Cup: 2025–26
- Tayside Premier Division winners: 1997–98
- East Region Tayside Premier winners: 2004–05
- Tayside Division One winners: 1978–79
- Dundee Junior League winners: 1895–96, 1905–06, 1908–09, 1914–15, 1956–57, 1959–60
- DJ Laing Homes League Cup: 1998–99, 2004–05
- Currie (Findlay & Co) Cup: 1989–90
- Intersport Cup: 1988–89
- Perth Advertiser Cup: 1989–90, 1992–93
- Tayside Drybrough Cup: 1983–84, 1985–86
- Tayside Regional Cup: 1989–90
- Courier Cup: 1893–94, 1894–95, 1895–96, 1909–10, 1913–14, 1914–15, 1919–20, 1922–23, 1923–24, 1930–31, 1956–57, 1957–58, 1960–61, 1969–70
- Craig Stephen Cup: 1982–83, 1985–86
- Cream of the Barley Cup: 1975–76, 1980–81

== Notable former players ==
The following players each played in a professional leagues either before or after their time at the club:

- Willie Cook
- Ewan Fenton
- Iain Jenkins
- Alex Forbes
- Hamish McAlpine
- Gordon Smith
