= Forfar West End F.C. =

Association football club in Angus, Scotland

Forfar West End
- Full name: Forfar West End Football Club
- Founded: 1892
- Ground: Strathmore Park; Craig O' Loch Road; Forfar
- Capacity: 1500
- Coordinates: 56°38′39″N 2°53′47″W
- League: Midlands First Division
- 2025–26: Midlands First Division, 8th of 10
Home colours	Away colours

Forfar West End Football Club are a Scottish junior football club based in Forfar, Angus. Their home ground is Strathmore Park.

Up until the end of the 2005–06 season, they played in the Tayside Premier League of the Scottish Junior Football Association's East Region. They had previously finished as champions of the previous Tayside Junior Football League system once, in 1991.

The SJFA restructured prior to the 2006–07 season, and West End found themselves in the 12-team East Region, North Division. They won the championship in their first season in the division and were promoted to the Premier League.

In the 2007–08 season they finished as Runners up in the East Premier League giving them promotion to the Super League, but were relegated again the following season.

After the loss of several players and management staff, the club failed to raise a team on two occasions at the start of the 2011–12 season. At an East Region meeting on 18 October 2011, it was announced that the club were going into abeyance and would withdraw from all competitive fixtures for the remainder of the season.

West End returned the following season in the East Region North Division and worked their way back up to the East Super League in 2017–18 after two promotions in five seasons.

== Coaching staff ==
Role	Name
Manager	James Russell
Assistant Manager	Nicky Deuchars
Coach	Lee Esposito
Goalkeeping Coach	Mark Reid

== First-team squad ==
As of 1st August 2024

Note: Flags indicate national team as defined under FIFA eligibility rules; some limited exceptions apply. Players may hold more than one non-FIFA nationality.

No.	Pos.	Nation	Player
—	GK	SCO	Matty Smith
—	GK	SCO	Cameron Winter
—	GK	SCO	Dylan Mackie
—	DF	SCO	Owen Lockhart
—	DF	SCO	David Rae
—	DF	SCO	Glyn Hodnett
—	DF	SCO	Nate Maver
—	DF	SCO	Arran Leiper
—	DF	SCO	Josh Reekie
—	DF	SCO	Blair Mudie
—	DF	SCO	Jay Harkin
—	MF	SCO	Gary Archibald
—	MF	SCO	Fraser Sturrock

No.	Pos.	Nation	Player
—	MF	SCO	Cameron Black
—	MF	SCO	Ali Maule
—	MF	SCO	Jamie Allan
—	MF	SCO	Ben Holmes
—	MF	SCO	Jamie Moran
—	MF	SCO	Paddy McAuley
—	MF	SCO	Scott Hamilton
—	MF	SCO	James Russell
—	MF	SCO	Ben Russell
—	MF	SCO	Andrew Walls (C)
—	FW	SCO	Nathan Ford
—	FW	SCO	Brett Hampton

== Honours ==
Tayside Premier Division: 1990–91

Tayside Division One: 1982–83

Tayside Region League Cup: 2008–09, 2010–11

North & Tayside Inter-Regional Cup: 1992–93, 2007–08

Winter Cup: 1982–83
