= Downfield F.C. =

Association football club in Scotland

Downfield
- Full name: Downfield Junior Football Club
- Nickname: The Spiders
- Founded: 1906; 120 years ago
- Ground: Downfield Park; Balgowan Avenue; Dundee
- Coordinates: 56°29′34″N 2°59′30″W
- Chairman: Barry Cooney
- Manager: Davie Beveridge
- League: Midlands Premier League
- 2025–26: Midlands Premier League, 3rd of 10
Home colours	Away colours

Downfield Football Club are a Scottish junior football club based in the Downfield area of Dundee. Their home ground is Downfield Park.

== History ==
The club's nickname, "The Spiders", comes from the same term applied to Queen's Park, due to Downfield playing in the same narrow black-and-white hooped strips as Scotland's oldest club. When Downfield were first founded, Queen's donated a set of strips to them to assist with the start-up.

Downfield Park is situated in the Kirkton area of Dundee. The far side has a covered enclosure named after Eric Clark, a long-serving committee member now deceased. The south side of the ground contains the club's Social Club, incorporating the changing facilities. The west end has recently seen a flattening of the earth banking at that end, with a view to eventual construction of new facilities. The ground also occasionally plays host to Tayside Police's football side. From 2017, Downfield have groundshared Downfield Park with Lochee Harp whilst their new ground went through development, and plan to leave in late 2020.

Up until the end of the 2005–06 season, they played in the Tayside Premier League of the Scottish Junior Football Association's Eastern Region. The SJFA restructured prior to the 2006–07 season, and Downfield found themselves in the twelve-team East Region, North Division. They finished third in their first season in the division.

Downfield became the East Region, North Division champions in 2010–11. In terms of all-time trophy records, Downfield are second only to Tayport in the Tayside / North District roll of honour. The Scottish Junior Cup, along with the more recently created East Region Cup and Tayside/Fife Cup are the only honours to elude the club. The Spiders side which won the Tayside League three times in a row at the end of the 1980s is generally considered to be the best footballing side in Tayside's recent history.

Due to the mass exodus of teams from the SJFA's East Region to the East of Scotland Football League after the 2017–18 season, Downfield were placed into the SJFA East Super League for the 2018–19 season, finishing 11th place that season. After further defections to the EoSFL causing the East Super League to be split into divisions, the Spiders managed to get up to 4th place in the Super League North in 2019–20 season, before it being abandoned due to the COVID-19 pandemic.

=== 2021 takeover ===
In 2021, the club announced a takeover from Peter and Paul Marr, with a new committee led by David Beveridge to lead the club forward.

== Honours ==
North & Tayside Inter-Regional Cup: 1989–90, 1990–91, 2024–25

Midlands League Cup: 2024–25

Tayside Premier Division: 1987–88, 1988–89, 1989–90

Tayside District Division One: 2004–05

Tayside Region League Cup: 1979–80, 1981–82, 1982–83, 1986–87, 1987–88, 1995–96

Winter Cup: 1984–85
