= Kirriemuir Thistle F.C. =

Association football club in Angus, Scotland

Kirriemuir Thistle
- Full name: Kirriemuir Thistle Football Club
- Nicknames: Kirrie, Thistle
- Founded: 1921
- Ground: Westview Park; Kirriemuir
- Coordinates: 56°40′12″N 3°0′52″W
- President: Wilson Coupar
- Manager: Stephen McNally
- League: Midlands Premier League
- 2025–26: Midlands Premier League, 8th of 10
- Website: https://www.kirriethistle.com/
| Home colours | Away colours |

Kirriemuir Thistle Football Club are a Scottish junior football club based in Kirriemuir, Angus. Their home ground is Westview Park.

Up until the end of the 2005–06 season, the club played in Tayside Division One of the Scottish Junior Football Association's East Region. They had previously finished as champions of the previous Tayside Junior Football League system once, in 1974.

The SJFA restructured prior to the 2006–07 season, and Kirriemuir found themselves in the twelve-team East Region, North Division. They finished eighth in their first season in the division.

A co-management duo of Chris Kettles and Ralph Brand were appointed in September 2017, with Kettles assuming sole charge after Brand stepped down in January 2018.

On 14 June 2021, Darren Scott has left the club.

== Non-playing staff ==
- Manager - Bryan Duell

== Honours ==
Tayside Premier Division winners: 1973–74

Tayside Division One winners: 1996–97

North & Tayside Inter-Regional Cup: 1998–99

Tayside Region Junior League Cup: 1977–78, 1985–86

Winter Cup: 1987–88, 1990–91

Downfield SC League Cup: 1995–96, 1996–97
