= Letham F.C. =

Association football club in Perth, Scotland

Letham
- Full name: Letham Football Club
- Nickname: Tangerines
- Founded: 1960
- Ground: Seven Acres; Letham, Perth and Kinross, Scotland
- Capacity: 300
- Coordinates: 56°24′15″N 3°28′44″W
- League: Midlands Premier League
- 2025–26: Midlands Premier League, 10th of 10
Home colours	Away colours

Letham Football Club are a Scottish football club from the Letham area in the northwest of Perth. They are members of the East Region of the Scottish Junior Football Association and currently play in the Midlands Football League.

== History ==
Letham were formed in 1960 as an amateur club, playing in the Perthshire Amateur Football Association. They joined the Scottish Junior Football Association in 2021. Their home ground is Seven Acres. The club has a longstanding history in youth football and currently runs around twenty teams in various age groups.
