= Coupar Angus F.C. =

Association football club in Perth and Kinross, Scotland

Coupar Angus JFC
- Full name: Coupar Angus Junior Football Club
- Nickname: The Foxes
- Founded: 1935
- Ground: Foxhall Park; Forfar Road; Coupar Angus
- Capacity: 1,800
- Coordinates: 56°32′57″N 3°15′37″W
- Manager: Barry Britton
- League: Midlands First Division
- 2025–26: Midlands First Division, 7th of 10
Home colours	Away colours

Coupar Angus Junior Football Club are a Scottish Junior football club based in Coupar Angus, Perth and Kinross. Their home ground is Foxhall Park.

Formed in 1935, they joined the Angus Junior League the same year and remained in that league until their move to the Perthshire Junior League in the 1960s. In 1969 they joined the Midland Region Junior League, but the following year joined the Tayside Premier League of the Scottish Junior Football Association's Eastern Region.

The SJFA restructured prior to the 2006–07 season, and Coupar Angus found themselves in the twelve-team East Region, North Division. They finished eleventh in their first season in the division.

The team have were managed from the beginning of the 2016–17 season by Logan McConachie after previous manager Ross Graham departed to become a director at Forfar Athletic. McConachie was one of football's youngest managers, being only 24 at the time of his appointment. McConachie left Coupar Angus at the end of the 2017–18 season to become Assistant Manager at Jeanfield Swifts.

McConachie was replaced by Tam Stevenson at the start of the 2018–19 season, while on 9 March 2022, co-managers were appointed to run the team.

The club is currently managed by Barry Britton.

== Honours ==
- Midlands League (bottom half) Cup: 2024–25
