= Broughty Athletic F.C. =

Association football club in Scotland

Broughty Athletic
- Full name: Broughty Athletic Junior Football Club
- Nickname: The Fed
- Founded: 1920 (as Broughty Ex-Servicemen)
- Ground: Whitton Park; Arbroath Road; Broughty Ferry, Dundee
- Capacity: 2500
- Coordinates: 56°28′40″N 2°53′29″W
- Chairman: Gordon Deuchars
- Manager: Darren Scott
- League: Midlands Premier League
- 2025–26: Midlands Premier League, 2nd of 10
Home colours	Away colours

Broughty Athletic Junior Football Club is a Scottish football club based in Broughty Ferry, a suburb of the city of Dundee. Members of the Scottish Junior Football Association, they currently play in the Midlands Premier League.

== History ==
Formed in 1920 as Broughty Ex-Servicemen, the club was retitled Broughty Athletic in 1951. Around the same time they moved to Claypotts Park, directly opposite the medieval Claypotts Castle. In 1989 the ground was renamed Whitton Park, in memory of player and club official Eddie Whitton, who had died on 5 June 1989. The SJFA restructured its leagues prior to the 2006–07 season, and "The Fed", as the club is known, found themselves in the twelve-team East Region, North Division.

In seasons 2007–08 and 2008–09, Broughty Athletic narrowly missed out on promotion, finishing second top of the Scottish Junior Football Association's North Division in both seasons. In 2009–10 promotion to the twelve-team Premier League was finally achieved. The club maintained Premier Division status by finishing eighth at the end of the 2010–11 season. They extended their stay in the Premier League when they finished in ninth place at the end of the 2011–12 season. The Fed finished bottom in the 2012–13 season, but stayed up due to a league reconstruction. They finished seventh in 2013–14 season and were promoted in season 2014–15 to the Super League following a two-legged play-off win over Armadale Thistle.

In their first season in the Super League the Fed finished a respectable tenth in the sixteen team league. In season 2016–17 they went on to finish as high as seventh in the league and also triumphed in the GA Engineering Cup, beating rivals Tayport 5–1 in the final. The team have been managed since February 2018 by former Dundee United and Scotland U21 midfielder Jamie McCunnie, who assumed the role after a short interim period.

== Community ==
=== Dundee East Community Sport Club Project ===
Dundee East Community Sports Club is currently the most developed model of a Community Sports Club which Broughty Athletic are part of. The Hub is made up of 5 local football clubs, a Rugby Club, Cricket Club, Tennis and Table Tennis Club, Bowling Club, a local Handball Club and also a Karate Club providing a pathway from ages 5 up to Adult's including Amateur and Junior level football clubs, The Hub itself is based in the East side of Dundee and is situated around Whitton Park, Forthill Sports Club, Douglas Sports Centre, Claypotts and Dawson grass pitches. DECSC are also developing strong links with the local primary and secondary schools.

The Hub currently has 12 clubs involved within its structure and has over 1200 members and 150 qualified coaches and volunteers. The Community Club already has a development plan in place and is working hard to implement the plan within the five-year set timescale. Their development plans are centred on the current development of Whitton Park facility to include a 7-a-side 3G floodlit training pitch and also an 11-a-side floodlit playing pitch which will be fully utilised by the local community. The 7-a-side pitch has been built and has been in use since July 2012. There will also be significant developments in changing facilities with a new state of the art stand to be built on the West side of the Whitton park which will include 6 changing rooms, fitness suite and also meeting and socialising facilities.

The Dundee East Community Sports Club has benefited from having a very strong committee in place. They have been successful in attracting committee members from all of the resulting clubs within the community club structure. They are a very ambitious committee and they are all working hard to ensure all the proposed developments come to life. The club has already established a branding and marketing profile which all teams affiliated are displaying on their team colours and the club have also already delivered fun day events and football festivals on a citywide basis. They hope that the new Whitton Park facilities will be built and be running before 2016

== Colours and crest ==
Broughty Athletic's traditional colours are red and white. In addition to Claypotts Castle, Broughty Ferry also has its own castle, which appears on the club badge shown.

== Honours ==
East of Scotland Junior Cup: 2018–19

North & Tayside Inter-Regional Cup: 2016–17, 2018–19

Midlands League (Top Half) Cup: 2024–25

East Region North Division: 2009–10

Tayside Division One: 1969–70, 1979–80, 1985–86

Tayside Region League Cup: 1974–75

Winter Cup: 1991–92, 1994–95

Downfield SC League Cup: 2000–01
