= East Craigie F.C. =

Association football club in Scotland

East Craigie
- Full name: East Craigie Junior Football Club
- Nickname: The Shipbuilders
- Founded: 1880
- Ground: Craigie Park; Old Craigie Road; Dundee
- Capacity: 3,300
- Coordinates: 56°28′31″N 2°56′26″W
- Manager: Vacant
- League: Midlands Premier League
- 2025–26: Midlands Premier League, 7th of 10
Home colours	Away colours

East Craigie Football Club are a Scottish football club based in Dundee. Members of the Scottish Junior Football Association, they currently play in the Midlands Premier League. The club are one of a number who claim to be the oldest Junior club currently in existence, but are the oldest football club playing in Dundee.

== History ==
The club were founded in 1880 when workers from the Wallace Craigie weaving mill in Dundee, who had formed a cricket team earlier in that year, remained to play football after the closure of the cricket season. Originally known as "Craigie", the club became East Craigie after a donation from the owner of a local farm of that name. East Craigie have played unbroken since their formation, and lay claim to being the oldest Junior club in Scotland although this is disputed by other clubs such as Kirkintilloch Rob Roy, Larkhall Thistle and Vale of Clyde.

Their current Craigie Park ground was opened in April 1932 with a game against Celtic which drew almost 8,000 spectators.

Former East Craigie players include Jimmy Sharp and Jimmy Easson who both went on to gain full international honours for Scotland, and Archie Taylor who won the FA Cup with both Bolton Wanderers and Barnsley.

Up until the end of the 2005–06 season, they played in the Tayside Premier League of the Scottish Junior Football Association's Eastern Region.

The SJFA restructured prior to the 2006–07 season, and East Craigie found themselves in the 12-team East Region, North Division. They finished seventh in their first season in the division.

In 2021–22 the club left behind the Junior level of football and moved upwards to join the Senior pyramid with the formation of the new Midland League.

== Honours ==
- North & Tayside Inter-Regional Cup winners: 2021–22
