= Dundee Violet F.C. =

Association football club in Scotland

Dundee Violet
- Full name: Dundee Violet Football Club
- Nicknames: The Pansies, The Violet
- Founded: 1883
- Ground: Glenesk Park; Balfield Road; Dundee
- Capacity: 2,000
- Coordinates: 56°28′24″N 2°59′55″W
- Chairman: N. Farquhar
- Manager: Andrew Heggie
- League: Midlands First Division
- 2025–26: Midlands First Division, 1st of 10 (champions)
Home colours	Away colours

Dundee Violet Football Club are a Scottish football club based in the city of Dundee. Members of the Scottish Junior Football Association, they currently play in the East Region North Division. Formed in 1883, their home ground is Glenesk Park and the club colours are royal blue.

Up until the end of the 2005–06 season, they played in the Tayside Premier League of the Scottish Junior Football Association's Eastern Region.

The club won the Scottish Junior Cup in 1928–29, defeating Denny Hibs 4–0 at Dens Park after a second replay. This was due to the original tie being protested as Violet played an ineligible player, then the first replay finishing in a 2–2 draw. In doing so, "the Pansies" became the first club from Tayside to win Junior football's national cup competition.

During the summer of 2017, Violet agreed a partnership with local youth club Fairmuir to provide a pathway to adult football for Fairmuir's young players. Fairmuir's Under 19 team were renamed Fairmuir Violet and many of the side signed dual contracts with both clubs. As part of the partnership agreement, Fairmuir's Under 19s train with DVFC on a weekly basis, sharing coaching resources and facilities at Glenesk Park for cup games. In addition Fairmuir's Under 17s team also train with Violet on a monthly basis.

== Honours ==
Scottish Junior Cup: 1928–29
Midlands League - First Division: 2025–26
