= Brechin Victoria F.C. =

Association football club in Scotland

Brechin Victoria
- Full name: Brechin Victoria Junior Football Club
- Nickname: The Vics
- Founded: 1917
- Ground: Victoria Park, Nursery Lane, Brechin
- Coordinates: 56°43′35″N 2°38′53″W
- Manager: Iain Ross
- League: Midlands First Division
- 2025–26: Midlands First Division, 10th of 10
Home colours	Away colours

Brechin Victoria Junior Football Club are a Scottish football club based in Brechin, Angus and currently play in the Midlands First Division. Their home ground is Victoria Park. The club have recently celebrated their centenary year 1917–2017. They enjoy links with the community and Brechin Youth Clubs to promote and work on the player development and pathway from grass roots to first team level.

Up until the end of the 2005–06 season, they played in Tayside Division One of the Scottish Junior Football Association's East Region. The SJFA restructured prior to the 2006–07 season, and Vics found themselves in the twelve-team East Region, North Division. They finished 12th in their first season in the division. They currently play in the Midlands Football League.

The team are managed since October 2018 by former Scotland Junior international goalkeeper Iain Ross.

== Honours ==
- Currie (Findlay & Co) Cup: 1979–80
- Tayside Regional Cup: 1979–80
- Angus Junior League: 1924–25, 1925–26, 1926–27, 1927–28, 1929–30, 1934–35, 1950–51 *Division One Rosebank Car Centre Cup: 1998–99
- Arbroath & District Cup: 1961–62
- Brechin Rosebowl: 1928–29, 1929–30, 1934–35, 1950–51, 1951–52, 1961–62, 1965–66
- Forfar & District Cup: 1924–25, 1936–37
- Forfar Businessman's Trophy: 1969–70
