= Dundee St James F.C. =

Association football club in Dundee, Scotland

Dundee St James
- Full name: Dundee Saint James Football Club
- Nickname: The Jamesies
- Founded: 2021
- Ground: Fairfield Park; Dundee
- Coordinates: 56°28′58″N 2°55′29″W
- Manager: Bobby McKenzie
- League: Midlands First Division
- 2025–26: Midlands First Division, 6th of 10
| Home colours | Away colours |

Dundee St James are a Scottish football club from the Mid-Craigie area in the east of Dundee. They are members of the East Region of the Scottish Junior Football Association and currently play in the Midlands Football League

== History ==
The club originally played amateur football in the Midlands Amateur Football Association under the name Fintry Amateurs, but joined the Scottish Junior Football Association in 2021, changing their name to Dundee St James. Their home ground is Fairfield Park, previously known as Midmill Park, former home of now-defunct club Elmwood.
