= Arbroath Victoria F.C. =

Association football club in Angus, Scotland

Arbroath Victoria
- Full name: Arbroath Victoria Football Club
- Nickname: Vics
- Founded: 1882–1895 / reformed 1904
- Ground: Ogilvy Park, Cairnie Loan, Arbroath
- Capacity: 4000
- Coordinates: 56°34′8″N 2°35′45″W
- President: Russell Ruxton
- Manager: Neil Cargill
- League: Midlands First Division
- 2025–26: Midlands First Division, 5th of 10
- Website: http://www.arbroathvics.co.uk
Home colours	Away colours

Arbroath Victoria Football Club are a Scottish Junior football club based in Arbroath. The club competes in the Midlands First Division and play their games at Ogilvy Park. They are nicknamed "the Vics".

== History ==
The original Arbroath Victoria (The Vics) were formed in 1882. In April of that year, they defeated a team called Sunrise 3–0 on the common. This club disbanded in 1895. Vics were re-formed in 1904 as 2nd Class Juniors, essentially a Juvenile club, before becoming full Juniors in 1910 and joining the Arbroath & District Junior League.

On 1 November 1890 the Vics met Burnside Athletic, another local side, on the common. According to the local newspaper of the time, it was a miserable one-sided game, with the Vics winning 15–0. To our knowledge this is the club's biggest ever win. That year the Vics won the Forfar and District Junior Cup. In 1951, after years playing on local public playing fields and at Gayfield Park during the Second World War, the Vics moved to Ogilvy Park. The Vics were unbeaten at home from 25 October 1952 to 4 June 1955. They were the Angus League Champions four times in the seasons from 1952 to 1956.

In 1971 the Vics reached the quarter-finals of the Scottish Junior Cup, but were beaten by Cambuslang Rangers. To date this is their best achievement in this event. Many players have joined the senior ranks over the years; and in the 1980s three players, Brian Goodall, Eric Martin and Gus Malone, were selected to play for the Scottish Junior team.

The Vics celebrated their centenary on 8 August 1982 when George Best, the former Manchester United, Northern Ireland international and European Footballer of the Year, turned out as a guest for them, scoring twice in a 4–3 win against Arbroath F.C

Until the 1990s the Vics were one of the top teams in the region, winning almost every honour open to them, including the Angus League no fewer than 12 times. Recent seasons however have not been kind, and in 1999 the club came close to folding, but with a new committee and management team they appeared to have turned the corner, despite not having the best of results to begin with.

At the start of the 2002–03 season the Junior regions were restructured, and the Vics won promotion to the Tayside Premier Division for the first time in 10 years. And with Tayside's top two teams, Carnoustie and Tayport, ending their domination of the league by electing to play in the new Scottish Junior Football East Region Super League, the Vics stood a good chance of remaining in the Premier Division. However although the Vics started the season well, they tailed off towards the end and found themselves back in the First Division.

In 2013–14 the Vics played in the newly formed First Division North: after the East Region AGM the three regional divisions were merged into two and branded as North and South. Clubs in the Central division were split between the two new leagues on a geographical basis. After a promising start to the season the Vics finished in 11th place, their worst finish since 2006–07 when they finished 10th.

In October 2014, the club announced that Jake Ferrier was retiring and thus stepping down from his post, ending an eight-year stint in charge of the Vics.

The Vics finished the 2014–15 season on high finishing sixth their best position since they were promoted to the old Tayside Premier Division back in 2002–03.

Since finishing sixth in the 2014–15 season the Vic's have since struggled in the league finish the next four seasons in the bottom half of the league.

The team is currently managed by ex Forfar Athletic u20's manager Eddie Gray.

The Vics' local rivals were Arbroath Sporting Club until ASC folded in 2011.

Every year, the Vics contest the Urquhart Cup with Arbroath, the senior team in town. Names associated with the club have included Tony Cargill, Jim McIntosh, Samuel Meston, Mark McWalter and Paul Tosh.

== Honours ==
- Tayside Regional Cup: 1972–73, 1983–84
- Cream of the Barley Cup: 1983–84
- Tayside Drybrough Cup: 1974–75
- Tayside Regional League Cup: 1973–74
- Currie (Findlay & Co) Cup: 1972–73
- Forfar Businessman's Trophy: 1964–65, 1965–66, 1970–71, 1971–72
- Arbroath & District Cup: 1923–24, 1927–28, 1928–29, 1929–30, 1930–31, 1947–48, 1953–54, 1967–68, 1970–71
- Brechin Rosebowl: 1954–55, 1967–68, 1968–69
- Forfarshire Junior Consolation Cup: 1959–60
- Angus Junior League: 1928–29, 1936–37, 1953–54, 1954–55, 1956–57
- Forfarshire Junior Cup: 1933–34, 1941–42, 1953–54

== Stadium ==
Arbroath's Victoria Ogilvy Park has been their home since 1951, but like many other junior teams the Vics played on local public playing fields. During the World War II the Vics played at Gayfield (the home of Arbroath F.C.) as senior football had ceased for the duration of the war. When Arbroath F.C. required their ground back, the committee began to look for their own ground. The club secretary of the time, Jimmy Smith, was instrumental in securing a piece of waste land in the Cairnie area of the town, and the committee set about transforming this into a football pitch. The park was officially opened in 1951 and named Ogilvy Park in honour of Lord Ogilvy who owned the land in the Cairnie area.

== Club officials ==
Committee Member	Name
President	(Scotland) Russell Ruxton
Club Secretary	(Scotland) Neil Hardie
Committee Member	(Scotland) Paul Fraser
Committee Member	(Scotland) Arthur Walker
Committee Member	(Scotland) Colin Pankhurst
Committee Member	(Scotland) Jake Ferrier
Committee Member	(Scotland) Willie Kiddie
Committee Member	(Scotland) Steve Dall
Coaching staff	Name
Manager	(Scotland) Eddie Gray
Assistant Manager	(Scotland) David Sturrock
First Team Coach	(Scotland) Arthur Gray
Goalkeeping Coach	(Scotland) Graham Duff
Club Medic	(Republic of Ireland) Darren Hogg

Playing staff Name
