= Lochee Harp F.C. =

Association football club in Scotland

Lochee Harp
- Full name: Lochee Harp Junior Football Club
- Nickname: The Harp
- Founded: 1904
- Ground: Lochee Community Sports Hub, Lundie Avenue, Dundee
- Capacity: 500
- Coordinates: 56°28′41″N 3°0′13″W
- Chairman: Mike Kelly
- Manager: Mark Kelly/Mark McDonald
- League: Midlands Premier League
- 2025–26: Midlands Premier League, 9th of 10
Home colours	Away colours

Lochee Harp Football Club are a Scottish Junior football club historically based in the Lochee area of the city of Dundee. Formed in 1904 and nicknamed "the Harp", they play at Lochee Community Sports Hub. The team moved into this new ground adjacent to the former home of Beechwood Park in late 2020. Their strip colours are green and white.

Lochee Harp were formed among the Irish community in Lochee, and derive their history as an Irish Catholic football club. They were formed in much the same way as Hibernian, by local priests and church members to alleviate the boredom of the workers and provide some recreation. Dundee United have much the same origins, having been formed as Dundee Hibernian, and there was another Irish based club in the Lochee area as well, Lochee Emmet, named after the Irish patriot Robert Emmet.

They were members of the Tayside Junior League, but are presently competing in the East region of Scottish junior football which they, along with all Tayside junior clubs became a part in 2002.

Lochee Harp were formerly a junior team, winning the Dundee Junior League in their first season, but have found success more hard to come by in recent years.

== Honours ==
Scottish Junior Cup

- Runners-up: 1953–54

=== Other honours ===
- Tayside Premier Division winners: 1983–84 1984–85, 1985–86
- Tayside Division One winners: 1997–98
- Dundee Junior League winners: 1904–05, 1906–07, 1910–11, 1922–23, 1923–24, 1926–27, 1928–29, 1929–30, 1930–31, 1931–32, 1934–35, 1935–36, 1937–38, 1948–49, 1949–50, 1953–54, 1954–55, 1958–59, 1960–61, 1962–63
- Currie (Findlay & Co) Cup: 1980–81, 1985–86
- Division One (Downfield SC) Cup: 1997–98
- Tayside Drybrough Cup: 1982–83
- Tayside Regional Cup: 1980–81, 1985–86
- Courier Cup: 1927–28, 1928–29, 1933–34, 1938–39, 1942–43, 1943–44, 1948–49, 1950–51, 1952–53, 1954–55, 1958–59, 1962–63, 1965–66, 1966–67
- Cream of the Barley Cup: 1986–87

== Notable former players ==
- Brian Alderson
- Ewan Fenton
- Jackie Mudie
- Jimmy Rooney
- Mike Kelly
- Philip Mulholland
