= Tayport F.C. =

Association football club in Fife, Scotland

Tayport
- Full name: Tayport Football Club
- Nickname: The Port
- Founded: 1947
- Ground: The Canniepairt; Shanwell Road; Tayport
- Capacity: 2,000
- Coordinates: 56°26′34″N 2°52′16″W
- Chairman: David Baikie
- Manager: George Shields
- League: Midlands Premier League
- 2025–26: Midlands Premier League, 4th of 10
Home colours	Away colours

Tayport Football Club are a Scottish football club from Tayport, Fife. Formed in 1947, they play their home games at The Canniepairt. Nicknamed the Port, the club's colours are red, white and black.

They presently play in the Midlands Football League, ran by Scottish Junior Football Association and in the 6th tier of the Scottish football league system.

Although the club is based in Fife, their close geographical location to Dundee and Angus meant that, when they became a junior club, they chose to join the Tayside League rather than the Fife League. They had success in the 1990s and early-2000s, winning the league they were competing in every season since 1990–91, bar four times when they managed to finish as runners-up.

== History ==
For over a century the game of football has been a major influence in most communities in Scotland. Tayport, a small former burgh of just under 9,000 inhabitants, situated on Fife's most northern extremity on the south bank of the River Tay, is no exception.

From Victorian times, through to the Second World War, the town has always had at least one football club. Information from those days is sketchy, but we do know that Tayport had a Junior club pre-First World War, winning the East of Fife Cup in 1905, for example. The Great War in 1914 effectively signalled the demise of Junior football in the town for 75 years.

Throughout the 1920s and 1930s there were various amateur clubs in the town, but success was fleeting and there is little recorded history. After the Second World War and the second half of the 20th century beckoning, The town's football club was Tayport Violet. In 1947 a new club emerged as rivals to Violet when Tayport Amateurs was formed by local lads who had been playing friendlies together as a Senior Boy Scouts team. This was the birth of the club we know today.

These local lads entered the Amateurs team in the Midlands Amateurs’ Alliance League, a league which was essentially for clubs' reserve XIs. Local rivals Violet played in the Midlands' top division. By 1950, the Midlands Amateur Football Association was expanding and in the reorganised leagues, both the Violet and the Amateurs found themselves in Division Two.

Promotion was swift and the two teams finished the season in first and second spots respectively. 1952–53 saw Violet and the Amateurs finish second and third in the First Division behind the champions, YM Anchorage, who incidentally had won every title since 1933. Then, suddenly, Violet were gone. Despite finishing runners-up, it was their last season.

There were contrasting fortunes for the Amateurs during the 1950s and 1960s, but despite experiencing some quite often desperate times, the club managed to survive. That survival was important and a significant factor in the success the club was to enjoy during the latter part of the century. A new, young committee emerged in the late 1960s and the 1970s was a reasonably successful era, with the club establishing itself as a major force in the amateur game.

The club, which had always played its football on the East Common, required more modern accommodation and, at the invitation of Tayport Town Council, in 1975, moved across the factory burn from the East Common to The Canniepairt. This was formerly poor farming land which had been allowed to go to waste but which had recently been used by the Army for its Polex 70 Exercise. Clubrooms were constructed and, like the ground, were subjected to various upgrades in order to provide the accommodation which the club, and indeed, the community, now enjoys.

In 1980, the club which, since 1953 had run an Alliance, or Reserve XI, started a third team – the Fife XI – which was to enjoy 11 successful seasons in the East Fife Amateur Association and for one season, the Kingdom Caledonian League.

As the club's standing in the game developed, the committee felt the time was right to take a further step and, in 1990, the club's Junior team was launched and the name of the club became, quite simply, 'Tayport Football Club', a name which could embrace both amateur and junior grades. The enthusiasm for amateur football in the town waned, and through a lack of local players, season 2000–01 was to be the club's last in the Amateurs Leagues.

The club has found success since joining the Junior ranks in the Tayside League, including six Scottish Junior Cup Final appearances, with three wins – 1996, 2003 and 2005.

The team are managed by George Shields who replaced former manager Daryl McKenzie.

== Honours ==
- Scottish Junior Cup
  - Winners: 1995–96, 2002–03, 2004–05
  - Runners-up: 1992–93, 1996–97, 2003–04
- SJFA East Region Superleague
  - Winners: 2002–03, 2005–06
  - Runners-Up: 2003–04, 2004–05
- SJFA East Region Premier League
  - Winners: 2009–10, 2015–16

=== Other honours ===
- North & Tayside Inter-Regional Cup: 1991–92, 1994–95, 1999–00, 2001–02, 2002–03, 2003–04, 2004–05, 2014–15
- Tayside Premier Division winners: 1991–92, 1992–93, 1993–94, 1994–95, 1995–96, 1998–99, 1999–00, 2000–01, 2001–02
- Tayside Division One winners: 1990–91
- Currie (Findlay & Co) Cup: 1990–91, 1991–92, 1992–93, 1993–94, 1998–99, 2000–01, 2001–02, 2004–05, 2006–07
- North End Challenge Cup: 2000–01, 2002–03
- Fife & Tayside Cup: 1998–99, 1999–00, 2008–09
- DJ Laing Homes League Cup: 1997–98, 2001–02
- Intersport Cup: 1990–91, 1993–94
- Perth Advertiser Cup: 1990–91, 1995–96
- Premier/Division One Winners Herschell Cup: 1990–91, 1992–93, 1993–94, 1995–96, 1998–99, 1999–00, 2000–01, 2001–02
- Cream of the Barley Cup: 1994–95
- Redwood Leisure Cup: 2007–08 (after protest)
