= 2021–22 East of Scotland Football League =

East of Scotland Football League
- Season: 2021–22
- Dates: 16 July 2021 – 30 May 2022

The 2021–22 East of Scotland Football League (known as the Central Taxis East of Scotland League for sponsorship reasons) was the 93rd season of the East of Scotland Football League, and the 8th season as the sixth tier of the Scottish football pyramid system. The season began on 16 July 2021.

== Teams ==
The following teams changed division after the 2020–21 season.

=== To East of Scotland Football League ===
Transferred from East Premiership South

- Armadale Thistle
- Bathgate Thistle
- Bo'ness Athletic
- Fauldhouse United
- Livingston United
- Pumpherston
- Stoneyburn
- Syngenta
- West Calder United
- Whitburn
- Edinburgh College also joined.

=== From East of Scotland Football League ===
Withdrawn

- Eyemouth United

== Premier Division ==
East of Scotland Football League Premier Division
- Season: 2021–22
- Dates: 16 July 2021 – 14 May 2022
- Champions: Tranent Juniors
- Promoted: Tranent Juniors
- Relegated: Dunbar United; Newtongrange Star; Whitehill Welfare; Camelon Juniors
- Matches: 306
- Goals: 1,158 (3.78 per match)
- Biggest home win: Linlithgow Rose 8–0 Tynecastle (13 November 2021)
- Biggest away win: Whitehill Welfare 0–7 Tranent Juniors (9 November 2021)
- Highest scoring: 4 matches: 9 goals (Note: The matches were Lothian Thistle Hutchison Vale 4–5 Inverkeithing Hillfield Swifts on 31 July 2021, Dundonald Bluebell 6–3 Dunbar United on 6 November 2021, Inverkeithing Hillfield Swifts 4–5 Crossgates Primrose on 10 November 2021 and Sauchie Juniors 5–4 Jeanfield Swifts on 11 May 2022.)
- Longest winning run: 16 matches: Linlithgow Rose
- Longest unbeaten run: 18 matches: Linlithgow Rose & Tranent Juniors
- Longest winless run: 14 matches: Newtongrange Star
- Longest losing run: 10 matches: Camelon Juniors
- Highest attendance: 1,270; Tranent Juniors 2–0 Jeanfield Swifts (14 May 2022)
- Average attendance: 192
- All statistics correct as of 14 May 2022.

Location of teams in 2021–22 East of Scotland Football League Premier Division

The Premier Division remained with the same 18 clubs as before, after the 2020–21 season was declared null and void. This was to be reduced to 16 clubs for the 2022–23 season, with at least 4 clubs being relegated depending on promotion and relegation with the Lowland League.

The league title went down to the final round of matches with Tranent Juniors ultimately winning the league on goal difference ahead of Penicuik Athletic.

=== Stadia and locations ===
Team	Location	Home ground	Capacity	Seats
Blackburn United ^{[SFA]}	Blackburn	New Murrayfield Park	1,500	0
Broxburn Athletic ^{[SFA]}	Broxburn	Albyn Park	1,000	0
Camelon Juniors ^{[SFA]}	Camelon	Carmuirs Park	2,000	0
Crossgates Primrose	Crossgates	Humbug Park	2,000	0
Dunbar United ^{[SFA]}	Dunbar	New Countess Park	2,500	0
Dundonald Bluebell ^{[SFA]}	Cardenden	Moorside Park	2,000	0
Hill of Beath Hawthorn ^{[SFA]}	Hill of Beath	Keir's Park	2,000	0
Inverkeithing Hillfield Swifts	Dalgety Bay	Dalgety Bay Sports & Leisure Centre	TBC	0
Jeanfield Swifts ^{[SFA]}	Perth	Riverside Stadium	1,000	0
Linlithgow Rose ^{[SFA]}	Linlithgow	Prestonfield	2,264	301
Lothian Thistle Hutchison Vale ^{[SFA]}	Pilton, Edinburgh	Ainslie Park (Note: Lothian Thistle Hutchison Vale are ground-sharing with The Spartans.)	3,612	534
Musselburgh Athletic ^{[SFA]}	Musselburgh	Olivebank Stadium	2,500	0
Newtongrange Star ^{[SFA]}	Newtongrange	New Victoria Park	2,300	30
Penicuik Athletic ^{[SFA]}	Penicuik	Penicuik Park	2,000	0
Sauchie Juniors ^{[SFA]}	Sauchie	Beechwood Park	5,000	200
Tranent Juniors ^{[SFA]}	Tranent	Foresters Park	2,300	44
Tynecastle ^{[SFA]}	Slateford, Edinburgh	Meggetland Sports Complex	4,388	500
Whitehill Welfare ^{[SFA]}	Rosewell	Ferguson Park	2,614	192

Notes

All grounds equipped with floodlights, except Humbug Park (Crossgates Primrose).

=== League table ===
Pos	Team	Pld	W	D	L	GF	GA	GD	Pts	Promotion, qualification or relegation
1	Tranent Juniors (C, O, P)	34	24	8	2	87	28	+59	80	Qualification for the Lowland League play-off
2	Penicuik Athletic	34	25	5	4	73	35	+38	80	
3	Linlithgow Rose	34	20	8	6	88	38	+50	68	
4	Jeanfield Swifts	34	19	2	13	79	59	+20	59	
5	Crossgates Primrose	34	15	8	11	68	65	+3	53	
6	Broxburn Athletic	34	15	4	15	62	57	+5	49	
7	Sauchie Juniors	34	15	4	15	65	62	+3	49	
8	Musselburgh Athletic	34	13	9	12	64	61	+3	48	
9	Dundonald Bluebell	34	13	8	13	63	64	−1	47	
10	Inverkeithing Hillfield Swifts	34	12	11	11	60	61	−1	47	
11	Tynecastle	34	13	5	16	71	78	−7	44	
12	Hill of Beath Hawthorn	34	13	5	16	63	70	−7	44	
13	Blackburn United	34	11	8	15	62	72	−10	41	
14	Lothian Thistle Hutchison Vale	34	12	5	17	61	76	−15	41	
15	Dunbar United (R)	34	10	9	15	54	72	−18	39	Relegation to the First Division
16	Newtongrange Star (R)	34	8	6	20	45	64	−19	30	Relegation to the First Division
17	Whitehill Welfare (R)	34	8	1	25	42	95	−53	25	Relegation to the First Division
18	Camelon Juniors (R)	34	6	2	26	51	101	−50	20	Relegation to the First Division

Rules for classification: 1) Points; 2) Goal difference; 3) Number of goals scored
(C) Champions; (O) Play-off winners; (P) Promoted; (R) Relegated

=== Results ===
Home \ Away	BLU	BRX	CML	CRS	DNB	DBL	HOB	IHS	JFS	LIN	LTV	MUS	NGS	PEN	SAU	TRA	TYN	WHI
Blackburn United	—	2–4	2–2	1–4	1–1	0–2	3–1	4–0	1–3	1–2	3–3	2–2	2–4	1–2	1–0	1–5	1–3	3–2
Broxburn Athletic	0–1	—	2–1	3–2	2–2	0–1	4–0	3–0	2–3	0–2	3–3	3–2	4–3	1–4	3–0	1–3	3–1	1–0
Camelon Juniors	3–4	2–3	—	2–3	2–2	2–4	0–2	0–5	2–5	1–3	1–3	2–3	4–1	1–6	2–4	0–4	2–1	0–1
Crossgates Primrose	1–0	1–0	2–1	—	3–2	1–1	4–1	1–1	2–4	1–1	3–1	3–2	2–0	1–2	1–3	1–4	2–1	4–3
Dunbar United	2–2	2–1	0–1	2–2	—	1–2	2–2	3–1	0–1	3–2	1–4	2–2	1–1	0–1	2–1	2–2	2–1	3–1
Dundonald Bluebell	1–5	2–0	2–1	2–1	6–3	—	1–4	1–1	2–4	2–2	5–0	1–2	5–2	1–3	2–2	1–3	0–3	4–1
Hill of Beath Hawthorn	1–1	1–0	1–4	3–1	4–0	2–0	—	0–0	4–1	3–1	0–3	2–2	1–2	1–2	1–2	2–3	1–6	4–2
Inverkeithing Hillfield Swifts	2–2	2–2	3–1	4–5	4–1	1–1	1–2	—	1–0	2–1	1–0	0–4	3–0	1–3	2–3	2–3	1–1	4–2
Jeanfield Swifts	0–4	2–5	4–1	4–0	1–0	1–2	3–2	3–1	—	0–0	4–1	3–0	2–3	4–1	2–1	0–1	6–1	4–0
Linlithgow Rose	2–4	2–0	2–1	5–2	5–1	5–1	6–1	4–0	2–0	—	3–0	2–2	2–0	1–3	2–0	3–3	8–0	4–0
Lothian Thistle Hutchison Vale	0–3	2–1	4–1	2–2	1–3	1–0	2–1	4–5	2–1 (Note: Match played at St Mark's Park, due to a clashing fixture for Edinburgh City.)	2–2	—	2–2	3–1	1–2	2–4	0–1	3–1	4–1
Musselburgh Athletic	4–1	3–1	6–1	2–2	1–3	3–2	1–2	2–2	3–2	0–6	3–0	—	1–0	1–0	2–0	2–2	1–2	0–1
Newtongrange Star	1–1	2–3	5–2	2–0	1–4	1–1	2–0	1–1	0–1	0–1	0–2	2–0	—	1–2	1–3	2–2	1–2	0–1
Penicuik Athletic	1–2	1–1	2–1	1–0	2–1	1–1	2–1	2–2	5–0	2–1	3–1	1–0	0–0	—	2–1	0–3	3–2	4–0
Sauchie Juniors	3–1	3–2	1–2	2–5	1–3	0–2	4–2	1–1	5–4	0–0	3–2	3–0	3–2	1–2	—	1–3	1–1	4–0
Tranent Juniors	5–0	1–0	3–0	1–1	3–0	2–0	2–2	0–1	2–0	2–2	3–0	3–0	1–0	1–1	2–0	—	3–0	3–0
Tynecastle	2–1	1–2	5–1	1–4	7–0	3–3	1–6	0–2	2–2	1–2	6–2	3–3	1–3	0–2	3–2	3–1	—	3–2
Whitehill Welfare	4–1	0–2	3–4	1–1	1–0	3–2	2–3	1–3	1–5	0–2	3–1	0–3	3–1	1–5	0–3	0–7	2–3	—

Legend: Blue = home team win; Yellow = draw; Red = away team win.

== First Division ==
The First Division conferences remain the same as the 2020–21 season, with the exception of Edinburgh South moving from A to B in order to balance the conferences after Eyemouth's withdrawal. Clubs that finish second to seventh in each conference will form part of a First Division of 16 clubs and the remaining clubs will make up the Second Division in 2022–23.

=== Conference A ===
East of Scotland Football League First Division Conference A
- Season: 2021–22
- Dates: 16 July 2021 – 28 May 2022
- Champions: Haddington Athletic
- Promoted: Haddington Athletic
- Matches: 210
- Goals: 868 (4.13 per match)
- Biggest home win: Leith Athletic 10–0 St Andrews United (2 October 2021); Dunipace 10–0 Craigroyston (9 October 2021)
- Biggest away win: Craigroyston 2–11 Dunipace (8 January 2022)
- Highest scoring: Craigroyston 2–11 Dunipace (8 January 2022)
- Longest winning run: 13 matches: Haddington Athletic
- Longest unbeaten run: 19 matches: Haddington Athletic
- Longest winless run: 22 matches: Ormiston
- Longest losing run: 8 matches: Kennoway Star Hearts
- All statistics correct as of 28 May 2022.

Location of teams in 2021–22 East of Scotland Football League First Division Conference A

==== Stadia and locations ====
Team	Location	Home ground	Capacity	Seats	Floodlit
Arniston Rangers	Gorebridge	Newbyres Park	3,000	0	No
Coldstream ^{[SFA]}	Coldstream	Home Park	1,000	0	Yes
Craigroyston	Edinburgh	St Mark's Park	2,000	0	No
Dalkeith Thistle ^{[SFA]}	Dalkeith	King's Park	2,000	0	Yes
Dunipace ^{[SFA]}	Denny	Westfield Park	2,000	0	Yes
Edinburgh United	Edinburgh	Paties Road Stadium	2,500	200	No
Haddington Athletic ^{[SFA]}	Haddington	Millfield Park	1,500	0	Yes
Kennoway Star Hearts	Star	Treaton Park	1,000	0	Yes
Kirkcaldy & Dysart	Kirkcaldy	Denfield Park	1,200	0	No
Leith Athletic	Edinburgh	Peffermill 3G	500	0	Yes
Ormiston	Ormiston	New Recreation Park	1,000	0	No
Rosyth	Rosyth	Fleet Grounds	300	0	Yes
St Andrews United	St Andrews	Recreation Park	766	0	Yes
Thornton Hibs	Thornton	Memorial Park	1,800	0	No
Tweedmouth Rangers	Berwick-upon-Tweed	Old Shielfield	1,000	0	No

==== League table ====
Pos	Team	Pld	W	D	L	GF	GA	GD	Pts	Promotion or qualification
1	Haddington Athletic (C, P)	28	25	2	1	91	14	+77	77	Promotion to the Premier Division
2	Leith Athletic	28	20	3	5	83	26	+57	63	
3	Dunipace	28	20	2	6	115	34	+81	62	
4	Kirkcaldy & Dysart	28	20	1	7	79	33	+46	61	
5	Coldstream	28	13	5	10	53	53	0	44	
6	Kennoway Star Hearts	28	14	1	13	58	38	+20	43	
7	Rosyth	28	13	4	11	67	63	+4	43	
8	Thornton Hibs (R)	28	13	3	12	54	47	+7	42	Relegation to the Second Division
9	Edinburgh United (R)	28	12	5	11	48	48	0	41	Relegation to the Second Division
10	Arniston Rangers (R)	28	8	6	14	43	66	−23	30	Relegation to the Second Division
11	Dalkeith Thistle (R)	28	8	4	16	40	76	−36	28	Relegation to the Second Division
12	St Andrews United (R)	28	8	3	17	45	79	−34	27	Relegation to the Second Division
13	Tweedmouth Rangers (R)	28	6	0	22	40	87	−47	18	Relegation to the Second Division
14	Craigroyston (R)	28	4	3	21	34	118	−84	15	Relegation to the Second Division
15	Ormiston (R)	28	3	4	21	21	89	−68	13	Relegation to the Second Division

Rules for classification: 1) Points; 2) Goal difference; 3) Number of goals scored
(C) Champions; (P) Promoted; (R) Relegated

==== Results ====
Home \ Away	ARN	COL	CRG	DAL	DPC	EDN	HAD	KSH	KDY	LEI	ORM	ROS	STA	THO	TWE
Arniston Rangers	—	1–1	4–2	4–0	3–3	2–1	0–3	0–5	1–3	1–3	3–3	1–1	1–3	0–4	3–1
Coldstream	2–2	—	6–3	3–0	3–2	1–1	0–1	2–3	1–0 (Note: Match initially finished 2–4; later awarded 1–0 to Coldstream, as Kirkcaldy & Dysart fielded an ineligible player.)	0–4	3–0	1–2	2–0	0–5	4–2
Craigroyston	2–1	0–4	—	0–3	2–11	0–2	2–5	0–8	0–6	2–3	0–0	3–5	2–4	0–2	7–4
Dalkeith Thistle	1–1	1–4	5–1	—	2–1	2–0	0–7	2–3	0–3	0–4	1–2	0–4	2–1	2–1	8–2
Dunipace	2–0	4–0	10–0	8–2	—	7–1	0–0	3–0	2–3	4–0	8–0	5–2	7–0	5–1	6–2
Edinburgh United	3–0	0–2	2–2	0–0	1–2	—	1–4	1–1	0–3	1–1	4–0	0–3	3–1	2–1	1–0
Haddington Athletic	4–1	6–0	5–0	2–0	2–1	3–1	—	4–0	2–1	0–2	5–0	5–0	2–2	2–1	5–0
Kennoway Star Hearts	1–2	5–0	2–1	3–0	0–3	1–2	1–2	—	1–2	1–0	1–0	3–1	4–1	0–1	5–1
Kirkcaldy & Dysart	2–0	4–2	6–0	5–1	4–1	2–4	0–3	1–0	—	0–2	7–0	2–1	3–1	1–2	3–2
Leith Athletic	7–1	3–0	5–0	8–0 (Note: Match played at East Peffermill.)	2–0	1–2	0–3	3–2	1–1	—	2–1	5–2	10–0	1–2	4–0
Ormiston	0–1	0–4	0–0	1–1	0–4	1–4	0–3	0–3	1–5	0–2	—	1–3	0–2	2–4	4–3
Rosyth	2–3	2–2	2–3	4–2	1–5	3–1	1–4	1–0	3–2	0–3	6–0	—	2–2	2–3	4–2
St Andrews United	6–4	1–1	1–2	2–1	1–4	4–3	0–3	3–2	1–5	0–1	6–0	2–5	—	0–2	1–2
Thornton Hibs	1–0	1–3	6–0	2–2	2–4	0–3	0–2	0–2	0–2	3–3	0–2	3–3	5–0	—	1–0
Tweedmouth Rangers	0–3	0–2	6–0	0–2	0–3	1–4	0–4	2–1	1–3	0–3	4–3	0–2	1–0	4–1	—

Updated to match(es) played on 28 May 2022. Source:
Legend: Blue = home team win; Yellow = draw; Red = away team win.

=== Conference B ===
East of Scotland Football League First Division Conference B
- Season: 2021–22
- Dates: 16 July 2021 – 30 May 2022
- Champions: Oakley United
- Promoted: Oakley United
- Matches: 210
- Goals: 806 (3.84 per match)
- Biggest home win: Glenrothes 10–0 Easthouses Lily Miners Welfare (21 May 2022)
- Biggest away win: 6 matches: 6 goals (Note: The matches were Hawick Royal Albert United 0–6 Kinnoull on 24 July 2021, Newburgh 0–6 Oakley United on 4 September 2021, Lochgelly Albert 1–7 Glenrothes on 9 October 2021, Newburgh 0–6 Kinnoull on 13 November 2021, Hawick Royal Albert United 0–6 Oakley United on 20 November 2021 and Newburgh 0–6 Preston Athletic on 9 April 2022.)
- Highest scoring: Glenrothes 9–1 Hawick Royal Albert United (17 July 2021); Luncarty 9–1 Newburgh (22 January 2022); Glenrothes 10–0 Easthouses Lily Miners Welfare (21 May 2022)
- Longest winning run: 10 matches: Preston Athletic
- Longest unbeaten run: 14 matches: Oakley United
- Longest winless run: 16 matches: Hawick Royal Albert United & Peebles Rovers
- Longest losing run: 10 matches: Lochgelly Albert
- All statistics correct as of 30 May 2022.

Location of teams in 2021–22 East of Scotland Football League First Division Conference B

==== Stadia and locations ====
Team	Location	Home ground	Capacity	Seats	Floodlit
Burntisland Shipyard ^{[SFA]}	Burntisland	Recreation Park	1,000	0	Yes
Easthouses Lily Miners Welfare ^{[SFA]}	Easthouses	Newbattle Complex	1,500	100	Yes
Edinburgh South	Dalkeith	King's Park (Note: Edinburgh South are ground-sharing with Dalkeith Thistle.)	2,000	0	Yes
Glenrothes	Glenrothes	Warout Stadium	5,000	730	No
Hawick Royal Albert United ^{[SFA]}	Hawick	Albert Park	1,000	500	Yes
Heriot-Watt University	Edinburgh	John Brydson Arena, Riccarton Campus	250	195	Yes
Kinnoull	Perth	Tulloch Park	1,200	0	Yes
Lochgelly Albert	Lochgelly	Gardiners Park	3,200	0	No
Lochore Welfare	Crosshill	Central Park	1,300	0	No
Luncarty	Luncarty	Brownlands Park	1,200	0	No
Newburgh	Newburgh	East Shore Park	1,000	0	No
Oakley United	Oakley	Blairwood Park	2,000	0	No
Peebles Rovers	Peebles	Whitestone Park	2,250	250	No
Preston Athletic ^{[SFA]}	Prestonpans	Pennypit Park	1,500	313	Yes
Stirling University Reserves	Stirling	Gannochy Sports Centre	1,000	0	Yes

==== League table ====
Pos	Team	Pld	W	D	L	GF	GA	GD	Pts	Promotion or qualification
1	Oakley United (C, P)	28	20	4	4	76	27	+49	64	Promotion to the Premier Division
2	Glenrothes	28	19	6	3	85	23	+62	63	
3	Preston Athletic	28	20	3	5	67	18	+49	63	
4	Kinnoull	28	18	2	8	83	32	+51	56	
5	Luncarty	28	15	6	7	70	32	+38	51	
6	Lochore Welfare	28	15	3	10	62	38	+24	48	
7	Burntisland Shipyard	28	13	7	8	58	49	+9	46	
8	Heriot-Watt University (Note: Heriot-Watt University deducted 3 points for fielding an ineligible player.) (R)	28	14	5	9	44	28	+16	44	Relegation to the Second Division
9	Stirling University reserves (R)	28	9	6	13	52	50	+2	33	Relegation to the Second Division
10	Edinburgh South (R)	28	9	5	14	49	63	−14	32	Relegation to the Second Division
11	Easthouses Lily Miners Welfare (R)	28	8	4	16	43	85	−42	28	Relegation to the Second Division
12	Peebles Rovers (R)	28	5	5	18	33	80	−47	20	Relegation to the Second Division
13	Lochgelly Albert (R)	28	6	2	20	33	86	−53	20	Relegation to the Second Division
14	Newburgh (R)	28	3	5	20	28	91	−63	14	Relegation to the Second Division
15	Hawick Royal Albert United (R)	28	2	5	21	23	104	−81	11	Relegation to the Second Division

Rules for classification: 1) Points; 2) Goal difference; 3) Number of goals scored
(C) Champions; (P) Promoted; (R) Relegated

==== Results ====
Home \ Away	BUR	ELM	EDS	GLE	HAW	HER	KIN	LOG	LOW	LUN	NEW	OAK	PEE	PRE	STI
Burntisland Shipyard	—	3–0	0–5	2–2	6–0	2–2	1–0	3–0	2–3	1–1	5–3	1–3	1–4	0–2	2–2
Easthouses Lily Miners Welfare	1–2	—	2–3	2–5	1–1	0–3	2–4	4–1	0–3	0–3	3–2	1–1	2–2	0–3	3–3
Edinburgh South	0–2	3–4	—	1–6	3–0	0–0	2–3	4–2	2–3	1–0	2–1	0–1	4–0	1–2	3–3
Glenrothes	2–1	10–0	2–1	—	9–1	1–0	3–0	3–0	1–1	2–2	5–0	0–3	5–0	1–1	4–0
Hawick Royal Albert United	1–4	1–2	1–2	0–4	—	1–4	0–6	4–5	1–1	1–1	2–2	0–6	3–0	0–4	0–4
Heriot-Watt University	2–3	2–1	1–1	0–1	2–0	—	1–0	2–0	1–2	5–0	3–1	2–0	1–1	1–0	2–1
Kinnoull	4–0	7–1	7–0	1–2	7–1	3–2	—	1–0	4–2	1–0	5–1	1–2	7–1	1–3	1–2
Lochgelly Albert	0–1	1–4	4–2	1–7	2–2	0–1	0–3	—	1–5	2–4	2–0	0–3	1–3	0–5	2–1
Lochore Welfare	1–3	5–1	2–2	2–1	4–1	4–0	1–3	4–0	—	1–3	4–0	3–1	3–0	1–2	0–1
Luncarty	3–0	8–1	4–1	0–1 (Note: Match initially finished 1–1; later awarded 1–0 to Glenrothes, as Luncarty fielded an ineligible player.)	2–0	1–0	0–3	8–0	2–0	—	9–1	2–2	6–0	2–1	3–0
Newburgh	2–2	1–4	2–1	0–3	0–1	2–1	0–6	3–3	0–3	0–0	—	0–6	1–3	0–6	1–3
Oakley United	4–4	2–1	5–0	3–1	5–0	0–1	1–0	4–1	2–1	1–1	3–0	—	5–1	0–2	3–2
Peebles Rovers	0–4	0–1	2–2	0–3	6–0	0–3	1–1	1–2	1–0	2–4	3–3	0–5	—	0–1	0–5
Preston Athletic	2–3	5–0	1–2	0–0	8–0	1–0	2–2	3–1	1–0	1–0	2–0	1–2	4–0	—	2–0
Stirling University reserves	0–0	1–2	3–1	1–1	4–1	2–2	1–2	1–2	2–3	4–1	1–2	1–3	3–2	1–2	—

Legend: Blue = home team win; Yellow = draw; Red = away team win.

== Conference X ==
East of Scotland Football League Conference X
- Season: 2021–22
- Dates: 16 July 2021 – 28 May 2022
- Champions: Whitburn
- Promoted: Whitburn; Syngenta
- Matches: 165
- Goals: 755 (4.58 per match)
- Biggest home win: Armadale Thistle 8–0 Pumpherston Juniors (28 July 2021); Bo'ness Athletic 8–0 Pumpherston Juniors (31 August 2021); Fauldhouse United 9–1 Edinburgh College (2 October 2021)
- Biggest away win: Fauldhouse United 0–12 Whitburn (28 May 2022)
- Highest scoring: West Calder United 9–5 Pumpherston Juniors (7 May 2022)
- Longest winning run: 13 matches: Bo'ness Athletic
- Longest unbeaten run: 13 matches: Bo'ness Athletic & Syngenta
- Longest winless run: 14 matches: Pumpherston Juniors
- Longest losing run: 7 matches: Bathgate Thistle & Fauldhouse United
- All statistics correct as of 28 May 2022.

Two clubs were promoted to the Second Division for 2022–23.

Location of teams in 2021–22 East of Scotland Football League Conference X
Location of teams in 2021–22 East of Scotland Football League Conference X within West Lothian

=== Stadia and locations ===
Club	Location	Home Ground	Capacity	Seats	Floodlit
Armadale Thistle	Armadale	Volunteer Park	3,000	0	No
Bathgate Thistle	Bathgate	Creamery Park	3,000	0	Yes
Bo'ness Athletic	Bo'ness	Newtown Park	2,500	0	Yes
Edinburgh College	Edinburgh	John Brydson Arena, Riccarton Campus (Note: Edinburgh College are ground-sharing with Heriot-Watt University.)	250	195	Yes
Fauldhouse United	Fauldhouse	Park View	2,000	100	No
Livingston United	Livingston	Station Park	2,000	0	Yes
Pumpherston Juniors	Pumpherston	Recreation Park	2,700	0	No
Stoneyburn	Stoneyburn	Beechwood Park	4,000	0	No
Syngenta	Stenhousemuir	Ochilview Park (Note: Syngenta are ground-sharing with Stenhousemuir.)	3,746	626	Yes
West Calder United	West Calder	Hermand Park	1,000	0	No
Whitburn	Whitburn	Central Park	3,000	38	No

=== League table ===
Pos	Team	Pld	W	D	L	GF	GA	GD	Pts	Promotion or qualification
1	Whitburn (C, P)	30	23	3	4	115	42	+73	72	Promotion to the Second Division
2	Syngenta (P)	30	23	3	4	97	28	+69	72	Promotion to the Second Division
3	Bo'ness Athletic	30	22	2	6	106	38	+68	68	Qualification for the Third Division
4	Armadale Thistle	30	20	3	7	100	36	+64	63	Qualification for the Third Division
5	West Calder United	30	13	3	14	66	80	−14	42	Qualification for the Third Division
6	Stoneyburn	30	13	1	16	62	71	−9	40	Qualification for the Third Division
7	Livingston United	30	11	3	16	44	64	−20	36	Qualification for the Third Division
8	Edinburgh College	30	7	4	19	32	78	−46	25	Qualification for the Third Division
9	Fauldhouse United (Note: Fauldhouse United deducted 3 points for fielding an ineligible player.)	30	6	5	19	56	97	−41	20	Qualification for the Third Division
10	Bathgate Thistle	30	6	1	23	42	106	−64	19	Qualification for the Third Division
11	Pumpherston Juniors	30	4	6	20	37	117	−80	18	Qualification for the Third Division

Rules for classification: 1) Points; 2) Goal difference; 3) Number of goals scored
(C) Champions; (P) Promoted

=== Results ===
Home \ Away	ARM	BAT	BOA	EDC	FAU	LIV	PUM	STO	SYN	WCU	WHI	ARM	BAT	BOA	EDC	FAU	LIV	PUM	STO	SYN	WCU	WHI
Armadale Thistle		4–0	1–0	7–1	3–2	2–3	8–0	6–2	1–1	2–0	1–2			1–1		3–0	3–0	6–0				2–2
Bathgate Thistle	1–7		0–6	3–1	3–6	1–0	4–4	2–3	1–3	3–2	0–5	3–5			1–2				1–5	0–1	0–1	
Bo'ness Athletic	4–3	5–1		1–0	7–4	4–0	8–0	7–1	1–2	0–1	7–2		6–1			5–1				2–1	4–2	1–2
Edinburgh College	0–5	3–0	1–2		0–0	0–1	1–4	1–6	1–0	1–4	0–2 (Note: Match played indoors at Oriam.)	0–4		0–3		4–3	0–2	2–2 (Note: Match played indoors at Oriam.)				
Fauldhouse United	0–1 (Note: Match initially finished 2–1; later awarded 1–0 to Armadale Thistle, as Fauldhouse United fielded an ineligible player.)	4–2	0–4	9–1		0–1	3–1	2–1	0–1	3–4	0–9		1–2						3–1	0–4	3–4	0–12
Livingston United	0–4	4–1	0–3	1–1	4–2		2–3 (Note: Match played at Westfield Park, Denny.)	2–1	0–2	0–0	0–2		0–3	1–2		7–3					2–1	1–5
Pumpherston	0–6	2–0	2–7	0–0	2–2	1–1		0–2	1–5	0–3	1–4		2–3	1–3		0–0	2–1					0–4
Stoneyburn	2–3	3–2	0–4	1–2	2–2	0–1	4–1		4–3	1–0	3–2	2–1		2–3	0–5		3–2	5–1				
Syngenta	2–0	7–0	2–2	4–1	4–0	2–0	5–0	2–0		7–2	3–1	3–2			3–1		7–2	7–0 (Note: Match played at the Falkirk Stadium, Falkirk.)	1–0			
West Calder United	2–0	4–1	4–3	1–3	3–3	1–3	6–2	3–0	0–4		1–5	1–6			1–0			9–5	2–5	0–6		
Whitburn	2–3	4–2	2–1	4–0	2–0	5–3	6–0	3–2	4–4	3–3			6–1		4–0				4–1	2–1	5–1	

Legend: Blue = home team win; Yellow = draw; Red = away team win.

== Notes ==
^{SFA} Club with an SFA Licence eligible to participate in the Lowland League promotion play-off should they win the Premier Division.
