= 2022–23 East of Scotland Football League =

East of Scotland Football League
- Season: 2022–23
- Dates: 30 July 2022 – 27 May 2023
- Champions: Linlithgow Rose

The 2022–23 East of Scotland Football League (known as the Central Taxis East of Scotland League for sponsorship reasons) was the 94th season of the East of Scotland Football League, and the 9th season with its top division as part of the sixth tier of the Scottish football pyramid system. The season began on 30 July 2022 and ended on 27 May 2023. Tranent Juniors were the reigning champions but were unable to defend their title after gaining promotion to the Lowland Football League.

After running with multiple conferences as part of its structure for the past four seasons, the league moved to four linear divisions to accommodate the 60 clubs taking part. Linlithgow Rose won the Premier Division and became the fifth East of Scotland League and former SJFA East Region club to gain promotion to the Lowland League.

== Teams ==
The following teams changed division after the 2021–22 season.

=== To East of Scotland Football League ===
Relegated from Lowland Football League

- Vale of Leithen

Transferred from West of Scotland Football League

- Harthill Royal

=== From East of Scotland Football League ===
Promoted to Lowland Football League

- Tranent Juniors

== Premier Division ==
East of Scotland Football League Premier Division
- Season: 2022–23
- Dates: 30 July 2022 – 13 May 2023
- Champions: Linlithgow Rose
- Promoted: Linlithgow Rose
- Relegated: Blackburn United; Oakley United; Vale of Leithen
- Matches: 240
- Goals: 922 (3.84 per match)
- Biggest home win: Linlithgow Rose 10–0 Vale of Leithen (2 August 2022)
- Biggest away win: Vale of Leithen 0–8 Jeanfield Swifts (25 February 2023)
- Highest scoring: Musselburgh Athletic 10–2 Vale of Leithen (4 February 2023)
- Longest winning run: 8 matches: Linlithgow Rose
- Longest unbeaten run: 16 matches: Linlithgow Rose
- Longest winless run: 20 matches: Oakley United & Vale of Leithen
- Longest losing run: 20 matches: Vale of Leithen
- All statistics correct as of 13 May 2023.

The Premier Division reverted to a 16 team division, with Haddington Athletic and Oakley United promoted from First Division Conferences A and B respectively. A 2–1 win for Linlithgow Rose at Haddington Athletic on 29 April 2023, gave them an unassailable eight-point lead over Sauchie Juniors with two games remaining. They were promoted to the 2023–24 Lowland Football League as neither Abbey Vale or Beith Juniors held an SFA club licence to contest the play-off.

Location of teams in 2022–23 East of Scotland Football League Premier Division

=== Stadia and locations ===
Team	Location	Home ground	Capacity	Seats
Blackburn United ^{[SFA]}	Blackburn	New Murrayfield Park	1,500	0
Broxburn Athletic ^{[SFA]}	Broxburn	Albyn Park	1,000	0
Crossgates Primrose	Crossgates	Humbug Park	2,000	0
Dundonald Bluebell ^{[SFA]}	Cardenden	Moorside Park	2,000	0
Haddington Athletic ^{[SFA]}	Haddington	Millfield Park	1,500	0
Hill of Beath Hawthorn ^{[SFA]}	Hill of Beath	Keir's Park	2,000	0
Inverkeithing Hillfield Swifts	Dalgety Bay	Dalgety Bay Sports & Leisure Centre	TBC	0
Jeanfield Swifts ^{[SFA]}	Perth	Riverside Stadium	1,000	0
Linlithgow Rose ^{[SFA]}	Linlithgow	Prestonfield	2,264	301
Lothian Thistle Hutchison Vale ^{[SFA]}	Pilton, Edinburgh	Ainslie Park (Note: Lothian Thistle Hutchison Vale are ground-sharing with The Spartans.)	3,612	534
Musselburgh Athletic ^{[SFA]}	Musselburgh	Olivebank Stadium	2,500	0
Oakley United	Oakley	Blairwood Park	2,000	0
Penicuik Athletic ^{[SFA]}	Penicuik	Penicuik Park	2,000	0
Sauchie Juniors ^{[SFA]}	Sauchie	Beechwood Park	5,000	200
Tynecastle ^{[SFA]}	Slateford, Edinburgh	Meggetland Sports Complex	4,388	500
Vale of Leithen ^{[SFA]}	Innerleithen	Victoria Park	1,500	0

Notes

All grounds are equipped with floodlights, except Humbug Park (Crossgates Primrose) and Blairwood Park (Oakley United).

=== League table ===
Pos	Team	Pld	W	D	L	GF	GA	GD	Pts	Promotion, qualification or relegation
1	Linlithgow Rose (C, P)	30	23	5	2	97	22	+75	74	Promotion to the Lowland League
2	Sauchie Juniors	30	20	5	5	88	46	+42	65	
3	Musselburgh Athletic	30	17	5	8	75	33	+42	56	
4	Dundonald Bluebell	30	15	6	9	70	46	+24	51	
5	Jeanfield Swifts	30	15	4	11	74	53	+21	49	
6	Penicuik Athletic	30	13	9	8	51	38	+13	48	
7	Haddington Athletic	30	13	8	9	45	42	+3	47	
8	Crossgates Primrose	30	13	7	10	50	51	−1	46	
9	Broxburn Athletic	30	11	10	9	65	56	+9	43	
10	Lothian Thistle Hutchison Vale	30	13	4	13	56	57	−1	43	
11	Inverkeithing Hillfield Swifts	30	11	4	15	44	52	−8	37	
12	Tynecastle	30	10	7	13	42	55	−13	37	
13	Hill of Beath Hawthorn	30	10	6	14	55	55	0	36	
14	Blackburn United (R)	30	9	3	18	57	75	−18	30	Relegation to the First Division
15	Oakley United (Note: Oakley United deducted 3 points for fielding an ineligible player in their 0–7 defeat against Jeanfield Swifts.) (R)	30	2	3	25	30	103	−73	6	Relegation to the First Division
16	Vale of Leithen (Note: Vale of Leithen were given four three-point deductions: three games where they fielded an ineligible player – 1–3 defeat against Crossgates Primrose, 0–6 defeat against Inverkeithing Hillfield Swifts and 0–4 defeat against Hill of Beath Hawthorn – and for failing to fulfil a fixture against Inverkeithing Hillfield Swifts.) (R)	30	2	0	28	23	138	−115	−6	Relegation to the First Division

Source: East of Scotland Football League
Rules for classification: 1) Points; 2) Goal difference; 3) Number of goals scored
(C) Champions; (P) Promoted; (R) Relegated

=== Results ===
Home \ Away	BLU	BRX	CRS	DBL	HAD	HOB	IHS	JFS	LIN	LTV	MUS	OAK	PEN	SAU	TYN	VOL
Blackburn United	—	3–2	2–3	1–3	1–2	2–1	0–1	2–4	1–1	3–2	1–6	4–0	4–2	0–1	3–3	6–0
Broxburn Athletic	1–1	—	1–1	5–5	1–0 (Note: Match initially finished 4–1 to Haddington Athletic, but later awarded 1–0 to Broxburn Athletic.)	3–1	3–3	1–0	1–5	1–5	2–2	2–2	2–1	4–2	1–4	8–0
Crossgates Primrose	4–1	0–4	—	1–1	1–1	3–2	0–1	3–3	1–4	4–1	0–1	4–3	2–1	1–2	1–2	3–1
Dundonald Bluebell	5–2	2–2	1–1	—	1–2	1–2	3–2	0–2 (Note: Match played at New Central Park, Kelty.)	0–1	0–2	2–1	6–0	1–3	1–2	3–0	3–0
Haddington Athletic	3–2	1–2	1–2	1–3	—	1–1	1–1	2–1	1–2	5–1	0–0	2–1	1–1	4–3	0–0	2–0
Hill of Beath Hawthorn	6–1	1–1	0–1	1–6	2–3	—	1–3	1–2	3–3	0–1	1–2 (Note: Match played at Central Park, Cowdenbeath.)	2–1	3–1	4–4	2–2	4–0
Inverkeithing Hillfield Swifts	3–2	2–1	1–0	1–2	3–0	1–3	—	1–1	0–1	1–1	1–2	2–0	0–1	4–5	1–2	6–0
Jeanfield Swifts	4–2	2–0	2–1	0–2	4–1	0–2	2–0	—	2–4	3–1	1–3	7–0	2–2	0–5	4–2	8–2
Linlithgow Rose	3–1	4–1	7–0	5–1	2–0	3–1	1–0	4–2	—	1–2	0–1	8–0	4–0	0–0	3–0	10–0
Lothian Thistle Hutchison Vale	1–5	3–1	1–1	1–1	0–1	1–2	3–1	1–0	0–1 (Note: Match initially finished 4–2 to Lothian Thistle Hutchison Vale, but later awarded 1–0 to Linlithgow Rose.)	—	2–3	6–2	1–2	3–3	3–0	4–2
Musselburgh Athletic	1–0	0–4	2–4	1–2	1–1	0–2	7–0	3–0	0–0	3–0	—	7–0	3–1	2–0	0–1	10–2
Oakley United	0–3	1–4	1–2	2–2	2–3	1–4	0–1	1–3	1–5	0–2	1–6	—	0–2	2–5	1–1	2–1
Penicuik Athletic	5–1	1–1	1–1	2–0	1–0	2–1	2–0	3–3	0–0	0–1	1–1	2–0	—	1–3	1–1	4–0
Sauchie Juniors	3–0	1–0	2–1	2–3	2–2	4–2	4–0	2–0	2–4	6–1	3–1	5–3	1–1	—	4–0	3–0
Tynecastle	2–3	1–1	0–2	1–3	0–1	0–0	2–1	2–4	1–4	3–2	1–0	1–0	1–3	2–3	—	4–1
Vale of Leithen	3–0	2–5	1–2	0–7	1–3	2–0	2–3	0–8	0–7	2–4	0–6	1–3	0–4	0–6	0–3	—

Legend: Blue = home team win; Yellow = draw; Red = away team win.

== First Division ==
The First Division was made up of the four teams relegated from the Premier Division, along with those finishing 2nd to 7th in Conferences A and B. The league title came down to the final day of the season, with all four promoted teams – Dunbar United, Kinnoull, Glenrothes and Luncarty – still in a position to win. The title ultimately went to Dunbar United by one point over Kinnoull, having won 2–1 over Camelon Juniors with an injury time winner by Cammy Dawson.

Location of teams in 2022–23 East of Scotland Football League First Division

=== Stadia and locations ===
Team	Location	Home ground	Capacity	Seats	Floodlit
Burntisland Shipyard ^{[SFA]}	Burntisland	Recreation Park	1,000	0	Yes
Camelon Juniors ^{[SFA]}	Camelon	Carmuirs Park	2,000	0	Yes
Coldstream ^{[SFA]}	Coldstream	Home Park	1,000	0	Yes
Dunbar United ^{[SFA]}	Dunbar	New Countess Park	1,200	191	Yes
Dunipace ^{[SFA]}	Denny	Westfield Park	2,000	0	Yes
Glenrothes	Glenrothes	Warout Stadium	5,000	730	No
Kennoway Star Hearts	Star	Treaton Park	1,000	0	Yes
Kinnoull	Perth	Tulloch Park	1,200	0	Yes
Kirkcaldy & Dysart	Kirkcaldy	Denfield Park	1,200	0	No
Leith Athletic	Edinburgh	Meadowbank Stadium (Note: Leith Athletic are ground-sharing with Edinburgh.)	499	499	Yes
Lochore Welfare	Crosshill	Central Park	1,300	0	No
Luncarty	Luncarty	Brownlands Park	1,200	0	No
Newtongrange Star ^{[SFA]}	Newtongrange	New Victoria Park	2,300	30	Yes
Preston Athletic ^{[SFA]}	Prestonpans	Pennypit Park	1,500	313	Yes
Rosyth	Rosyth	Fleet Grounds	400	0	Yes
Whitehill Welfare ^{[SFA]}	Rosewell	Ferguson Park	2,614	192	Yes

=== League table ===
Pos	Team	Pld	W	D	L	GF	GA	GD	Pts	Promotion or relegation
1	Dunbar United (C, P)	30	19	6	5	57	31	+26	63	Promotion to the Premier Division
2	Kinnoull (P)	30	19	5	6	61	44	+17	62	Promotion to the Premier Division
3	Luncarty (P)	30	18	6	6	89	40	+49	60	Promotion to the Premier Division
4	Glenrothes (P)	30	17	7	6	79	53	+26	58	Promotion to the Premier Division
5	Newtongrange Star	30	16	2	12	74	54	+20	50	
6	Kirkcaldy & Dysart	30	14	4	12	68	61	+7	46	
7	Rosyth	30	13	4	13	58	51	+7	43	
8	Dunipace	30	12	6	12	58	58	0	42	
9	Preston Athletic	30	11	5	14	58	56	+2	38	
10	Whitehill Welfare	30	10	7	13	51	55	−4	37	
11	Camelon Juniors	30	9	10	11	55	61	−6	37	
12	Leith Athletic	30	9	7	14	53	66	−13	34	
13	Lochore Welfare	30	8	7	15	47	73	−26	31	
14	Burntisland Shipyard (Note: Burntisland Shipyard deducted 3 points for failing to fulfil a fixture on 24 September against Kirkcaldy & Dysart.) (R)	30	8	7	15	36	53	−17	28	Relegation to the Second Division
15	Coldstream (R)	30	8	4	18	43	82	−39	28	Relegation to the Second Division
16	Kennoway Star Hearts (R)	30	3	5	22	32	81	−49	14	Relegation to the Second Division

Source: East of Scotland Football League
Rules for classification: 1) Points; 2) Goal difference; 3) Number of goals scored
(C) Champions; (P) Promoted; (R) Relegated

=== Results ===
Home \ Away	BUR	CML	COL	DNB	DPC	GLE	KSH	KIN	KDY	LEI	LOW	LUN	NGS	PRE	ROS	WHI
Burntisland Shipyard	—	0–2	3–1	0–0	2–2	0–0	2–1	1–2	4–0	3–1	1–2	0–8	2–1	3–3	1–4	1–1
Camelon Juniors	2–1	—	5–3	1–1	3–3	1–1	2–2	1–2	3–2	2–3	1–1	0–5	4–3	2–3	2–4	1–0
Coldstream	2–3	3–3	—	2–2	2–1	0–6	3–2	1–2	1–6	2–1	3–4	2–1	2–3	1–0	1–1	2–3
Dunbar United	2–0	2–1	0–1	—	1–0	1–1	4–1	5–0	1–2	4–1	2–1	1–0	3–0	1–0	1–0	2–0
Dunipace	2–1	3–1	4–3	0–2	—	0–2	6–0	2–3	4–2	3–4	5–1	2–2	3–1	0–5 (Note: Match played at Ochilview Park, Stenhousemuir, due to vandalism of the pitch at Westfield Park.)	0–5	1–4
Glenrothes	0–0	4–3	7–0	3–2	3–1	—	4–0	2–2	4–2 (Note: Match played at Bayview Stadium, Methil.)	4–1	3–0	0–1	1–1	2–1	1–4	2–4
Kennoway Star Hearts	3–1	2–2	1–0	2–3	0–1	2–4	—	0–4	0–1	2–3	1–1	1–4	0–4	2–1	1–2	2–2
Kinnoull	0–0	2–1	3–0	2–4	2–2	1–3	5–0	—	1–0	3–0	1–0	1–1	2–1	0–2	3–0	4–1
Kirkcaldy & Dysart	2–1	3–1	2–3	4–0	4–0	2–5	3–2	4–0	—	2–0	4–2	2–2	0–3	3–1	6–4	1–2
Leith Athletic	2–0	3–2	2–2	1–1	0–1	2–4	3–0	1–2	3–3	—	4–2	1–3	0–1	2–2	2–1	1–1
Lochore Welfare	0–2	1–3	2–1	1–1	1–2	2–3	2–1	3–3	1–1	4–2	—	1–3	5–4	1–1	2–1	0–3
Luncarty	2–0	2–2	4–0	0–3	2–2	7–3	5–1	4–0	2–2	2–4	6–1	—	3–1	4–0	3–1	2–1
Newtongrange Star	1–0	0–1	3–0	1–3	2–1	5–3	2–1	0–1	2–1	4–4	7–2	4–3	—	3–5	2–0	0–2
Preston Athletic	3–1	1–2	3–0	3–0	0–5	2–3	1–1	1–3	4–1	5–2	1–2	1–2	0–4	—	2–0	3–3
Rosyth	1–3	1–1	4–0	1–2	0–0	5–0	3–1	3–4	1–2	1–0	1–1	2–1	0–5	2–1	—	3–1
Whitehill Welfare	3–0	0–0	1–2	2–3	0–2	1–1	3–0	1–3	4–1	0–0	2–1	1–5	2–6	1–3	2–3	—

Legend: Blue = home team win; Yellow = draw; Red = away team win.

== Second Division ==
The Second Division consists of the remaining clubs finishing 8th to 15th in Conferences A and B, plus Whitburn and Syngenta who were promoted from Conference X. Whitburn won the league title for their second consecutive promotion, winning the division by nine points.

Location of teams in 2022–23 East of Scotland Football League Second Division

=== Stadia and locations ===
Team	Location	Home ground	Capacity	Seats	Floodlit
Arniston Rangers	Gorebridge	Newbyres Park	3,000	0	No
Craigroyston	Warriston, Edinburgh	St Mark's Park	2,000	0	No
Dalkeith Thistle ^{[SFA]}	Dalkeith	King's Park	2,000	0	Yes
Easthouses Lily Miners Welfare ^{[SFA]}	Easthouses	Newbattle Complex	1,500	100	Yes
Edinburgh South	Colinton, Edinburgh	Paties Road Stadium (Note: Edinburgh South are ground-sharing with Edinburgh United.)	2,500	200	No
Edinburgh United	Colinton, Edinburgh	Paties Road Stadium	2,500	200	No
Hawick Royal Albert ^{[SFA]}	Hawick	Albert Park	1,000	500	Yes
Heriot-Watt University	Riccarton, Edinburgh	John Brydson Arena	250	195	Yes
Lochgelly Albert	Lochgelly	Gardiners Park	3,200	0	No
Newburgh	Newburgh	East Shore Park	1,000	0	No
Ormiston Primrose	Ormiston	New Recreation Park	1,000	0	No
Peebles Rovers	Peebles	Whitestone Park	2,250	250	No
Stirling University Reserves	Stirling	Gannochy Sports Centre	1,000	0	Yes
St Andrews United ^{[SFA]}	St Andrews	Recreation Park	766	0	Yes
Syngenta ^{[SFA]}	Stenhousemuir	Ochilview Park (Note: Syngenta are ground-sharing with Stenhousemuir.)	3,746	626	Yes
Thornton Hibs	Thornton	Memorial Park	1,800	0	No
Tweedmouth Rangers	Berwick-upon-Tweed	Old Shielfield	1,000	0	No
Whitburn	Whitburn	Central Park	3,000	38	No

=== League table ===
Pos	Team	Pld	W	D	L	GF	GA	GD	Pts	Promotion or relegation
1	Whitburn (C, P)	32	28	2	2	129	42	+87	86	Promotion to the First Division
2	St Andrews United (P)	32	24	5	3	93	30	+63	77	Promotion to the First Division
3	Heriot-Watt University (P)	32	22	4	6	90	31	+59	70	Promotion to the First Division
4	Arniston Rangers (P)	32	21	4	7	93	53	+40	67	Promotion to the First Division
5	Dalkeith Thistle	32	19	5	8	77	47	+30	62	
6	Thornton Hibs	32	18	4	10	86	54	+32	58	
7	Stirling University reserves (Note: Stirling University deducted 3 points for fielding an ineligible player in their 1–2 defeat against Tweedmouth Rangers.)	32	16	8	8	71	56	+15	53	
8	Tweedmouth Rangers	32	12	7	13	59	73	−14	43	
9	Peebles Rovers	32	11	8	13	50	54	−4	41	
10	Edinburgh South	32	10	6	16	55	65	−10	36	
11	Easthouses Lily Miners Welfare	32	7	8	17	45	84	−39	29	
12	Newburgh	32	8	5	19	39	82	−43	29	
13	Ormiston Primrose	32	7	7	18	42	71	−29	28	
14	Edinburgh United (Note: Edinburgh United deducted 2 points for fielding an ineligible player in their game against Newburgh – originally a 0–0 draw, the game was awarded 1–0 to Newburgh. Edinburgh United also deducted 3 points for fielding an ineligible player in their 1–5 defeat against St Andrews United.)	32	8	6	18	45	75	−30	25	
15	Craigroyston (Note: Craigroyston deducted 6 points for fielding an ineligible player in their 1–3 defeats against St Andrews United and Whitburn.) (R)	32	6	8	18	37	65	−28	20	Relegation to the Third Division
16	Hawick Royal Albert (R)	32	3	6	23	34	94	−60	15	Relegation to the Third Division
17	Lochgelly Albert (R)	32	3	5	24	43	112	−69	14	Relegation to the Third Division
18	Syngenta (R)	0	0	0	0	0	0	0	0	Withdrawn; record expunged

Source: East of Scotland Football League
Rules for classification: 1) Points; 2) Goal difference; 3) Number of goals scored
(C) Champions; (P) Promoted; (R) Relegated

=== Results ===
Home \ Away	ARN	CRG	DAL	ELM	EDS	EDN	HAW	HER	LOG	NEW	ORM	PEE	STI	STA	SYN	THO	TWE	WHI
Arniston Rangers		3–0	2–2	1–0	5–4	5–0	3–0	3–3	4–1	1–2	3–1	3–1	3–3	1–2		3–2	4–1	3–0
Craigroyston	1–5		1–5	2–2	0–2	0–2	3–2	1–0	0–0	6–0	1–1	1–2	0–2 (Note: Match played at Albyn Park, Broxburn.)	1–3		1–0	2–2	1–3
Dalkeith Thistle	2–2	3–0		2–0	2–0	4–0	1–2	0–3	4–0	4–2	4–1	2–0	2–2	1–3		1–3	3–2	0–4
Easthouses Lily Miners Welfare	6–3	1–1	1–5		1–3	5–3	3–1	0–5	3–2	2–4	2–2	0–4	0–4	0–1		1–3	1–1	1–7
Edinburgh South	1–4	2–3	0–2	0–1		0–0	1–1	0–3	4–3	1–1	1–0	3–4	0–1	0–2		0–1	2–1	3–5
Edinburgh United	0–3	2–0	1–1	1–1	2–3		1–0	1–7	1–1	0–1 (Note: Match initially finished 0–0, but match later awarded to Newburgh.)	2–2	3–1	1–1	1–5		0–4	0–1	3–4
Hawick Royal Albert	1–4	5–5	1–5	1–4	0–2 (Note: Match played at Volunteer Park.)	1–4		0–4	4–4	1–0	0–3	2–0	1–3	0–1		0–0	1–4	0–2
Heriot-Watt University	0–3	2–1	0–0	7–0	2–0	1–0	5–2		3–0 (Note: Match played indoors at Oriam.)	5–0	2–0	3–0	1–2	1–1		3–1	1–0	4–1
Lochgelly Albert	2–5	0–1	2–3	2–3	0–6	1–2	6–2	1–7		0–3	0–6	1–1	0–2	0–3		3–6	1–5	2–3
Newburgh	2–4	2–0	0–4	1–0	2–3	1–4	4–1	1–3	0–3		0–1	1–2	1–1	0–3		1–1	4–4	1–6
Ormiston Primrose	0–3	3–2	1–3	2–2	1–2	1–0	4–0	1–5	1–2	0–2		2–2	1–2	1–1		0–3	2–2	0–4
Peebles Rovers	0–2	1–0	0–1	1–1	5–2	3–0	2–2	0–1	7–2	0–0	3–0		2–1	1–1		0–5	3–1	1–4
Stirling University reserves	4–1	0–0	0–1	1–1 (Note: Match played at Newbyres Park, Gorebridge.)	5–3	1–4	2–2	1–1	3–1	3–0	4–1	2–1		1–4		4–0	8–1	0–5
St Andrews United	3–2	3–0	6–0	5–1	1–1	2–1	3–0	3–0	3–0	6–1	4–0	1–1	3–4			2–1	3–0	4–5
Syngenta																		
Thornton Hibs	1–2	3–2	3–2	2–0	1–1	6–3	6–0	5–4	7–0	5–0	1–2	4–0	5–3	1–7			2–1	1–4
Tweedmouth Rangers	3–1	0–0	1–6	4–0	3–3	3–2	2–1	0–3	2–2	2–1	5–2	2–1	2–1	1–3		2–1		1–5
Whitburn	5–2	4–1	4–2	3–2	3–2	6–1	3–0	3–1	8–1	6–1	4–0	1–1	8–0	3–1		2–2	4–0	

Legend: Blue = home team win; Yellow = draw; Red = away team win.

== Third Division ==
The Third Division featured the remaining nine clubs from Conference X, along with Harthill Royal who joined from the West of Scotland League. Bo'ness Athletic dropped only 7 points all season, as they won the division by 28 points from their closest challengers, Armadale Thistle.

Location of teams in 2022–23 East of Scotland Football League Third Division
Location of teams in 2022–23 East of Scotland Football League Third Division within West Lothian

=== Stadia and locations ===
Club	Location	Home Ground	Capacity	Seats	Floodlit
Armadale Thistle	Armadale	Volunteer Park	3,000	0	Yes
Bathgate Thistle	Bathgate	Creamery Park	3,000	0	Yes
Bo'ness Athletic	Bo'ness	Newtown Park	2,500	0	Yes
Edinburgh College	Edinburgh	Riccarton Campus (Note: Edinburgh College are ground-sharing with Heriot-Watt University.)	250	195	Yes
Fauldhouse United	Fauldhouse	Park View	2,000	100	No
Harthill Royal	Harthill	Gibbshill Park	1,800	0	No
Livingston United	Livingston	Station Park	2,000	0	Yes
Pumpherston Juniors	Pumpherston	Recreation Park	2,700	0	No
Stoneyburn	Stoneyburn	Beechwood Park	4,000	0	No
West Calder United	West Calder	Hermand Park	1,000	0	No

=== League table ===
Pos	Team	Pld	W	D	L	GF	GA	GD	Pts	Promotion
1	Bo'ness Athletic (C, P)	36	33	2	1	210	34	+176	101	Promotion to the Second Division
2	Armadale Thistle (P)	36	23	4	9	113	61	+52	73	Promotion to the Second Division
3	Edinburgh College (P)	36	20	3	13	95	63	+32	63	Promotion to the Second Division
4	West Calder United	36	18	6	12	83	61	+22	60	
5	Pumpherston Juniors	36	17	2	17	67	95	−28	53	
6	Bathgate Thistle	36	12	6	18	54	89	−35	42	
7	Fauldhouse United	36	10	6	20	65	89	−24	36	
8	Stoneyburn	36	11	3	22	49	100	−51	36	
9	Livingston United (Note: Livingston United deducted 6 points for fielding ineligible players in their 0–5 defeat against Harthill Royal, and in their 0–6 defeat against Edinburgh College.)	36	9	7	20	49	116	−67	28	
10	Harthill Royal	36	4	7	25	35	112	−77	19	

Source: East of Scotland Football League
Rules for classification: 1) Points; 2) Goal difference; 3) Number of goals scored
(C) Champions; (P) Promoted

=== Results ===
Home \ Away	ARM	BAT	BOA	EDC	FAU	HHR	LIV	PUM	STO	WCU	ARM	BAT	BOA	EDC	FAU	HHR	LIV	PUM	STO	WCU
Armadale Thistle	—	5–1	0–7	6–3	3–0 (Note: Match played at Creamery Park, Bathgate.)	5–0 (Note: Match played at Creamery Park, Bathgate.)	2–3	5–1	2–4 (Note: Match played at Creamery Park, Bathgate.)	2–0 (Note: Match played at Creamery Park, Bathgate.)	—	4–2	2–2	4–2	3–3	2–0	11–0	7–1	3–2	1–1
Bathgate Thistle	0–4	—	3–3	1–0	3–1	2–2	1–3	2–3	0–1	2–1	2–3	—	1–2	1–0	1–5	0–1	5–0	4–3	0–1	2–1
Bo'ness Athletic	4–0	10–0	—	3–1	8–1	14–0	11–1	7–0	2–0	3–1	5–2	12–0	—	5–1	5–1	4–0	8–0	7–0	13–0	5–3
Edinburgh College	2–0	7–2	3–4	—	1–0	2–2	0–0	0–1	5–1 (Note: Match played at Pennypit Park, Prestonpans.)	3–1	0–2	4–1	2–9 (Note: Match played at Albyn Park, Broxburn.)	—	3–1	5–0	5–1	0–3	6–0	0–0
Fauldhouse United	3–2	2–2	1–6	3–1	—	3–1	0–3	1–1	0–1	0–1 (Note: Match initially finished 3–2 to Fauldhouse United, but later awarded 1–0 to West Calder United as Fauldhouse United fielded an ineligible player.)	1–2	1–1	2–3	1–4	—	7–1	3–1	1–3	2–0	0–3
Harthill Royal	1–6	0–1	0–11	2–3	1–1	—	1–1	3–1	0–4	1–3	1–3	0–2	1–3	1–2	3–3	—	5–0	1–2	1–1	1–1
Livingston United	2–2	1–1	2–0	0–6	3–1	3–0	—	4–1	2–1	1–1	0–6	1–3	1–5	2–4	1–3	1–0	—	4–5	1–1	0–4
Pumpherston	1–3	2–1	0–4	0–2	4–2	2–1	3–1	—	2–0	0–5	1–2	3–1	0–5	0–3	3–1	4–1	2–0	—	5–1	2–5
Stoneyburn	3–4	0–3	2–7	0–4	1–4	4–0	3–1	3–3	—	3–2	1–0 (Note: Match initially finished 2–1 to Armadale Thistle, but later awarded 1–0 to Stoneyburn as Armadale Thistle fielded an ineligible player.)	0–1	2–4	0–5	2–3	1–2	4–2	0–2	—	2–1
West Calder United	0–4	1–1	0–3	3–2	3–2	3–0	2–2	3–2	7–0	—	2–1	2–1	1–6	3–4	5–2	2–1	6–1	5–1	1–0	—

Legend: Blue = home team win; Yellow = draw; Red = away team win.

== Notes ==
^{SFA} Club with an SFA licence eligible to participate in the Lowland League promotion play-off should they win the Premier Division.
