= 2023–24 East of Scotland Football League =

East of Scotland Football League
- Season: 2023–24
- Dates: 29 July 2023 – 22 May 2024
- Champions: Broxburn Athletic

The 2023–24 East of Scotland Football League (known as the Central Taxis East of Scotland League for sponsorship reasons) was the 95th season of the East of Scotland Football League, and the 10th season with its top division as part of the sixth tier of the Scottish football pyramid system. Linlithgow Rose were the reigning champions but were unable to defend their title after gaining promotion to the Lowland Football League.

Broxburn Athletic won their first East of Scotland Football League title by eleven points over Musselburgh Athletic, and were promoted to the 2024–25 Lowland Football League following a 12–2 victory over Dalbeattie Star in the Lowland League play-off.

== Teams ==
The following teams changed division after the 2022–23 season.

=== To East of Scotland Football League ===
Transferred from Lothian & Edinburgh Amateur League

- Linton Hotspur

=== From East of Scotland Football League ===
Promoted to Lowland Football League

- Linlithgow Rose

Folded

- Syngenta

== Premier Division ==
East of Scotland Football League Premier Division
- Season: 2023–24
- Dates: 29 July 2023 – 18 May 2024
- Champions: Broxburn Athletic
- Promoted: Broxburn Athletic
- Relegated: Crossgates Primrose; Inverkeithing Hillfield Swifts; Kinnoull
- Matches: 240
- Goals: 930 (3.88 per match)
- Biggest home win: Tynecastle 9–0 Penicuik Athletic (12 August 2023)
- Biggest away win: Kinnoull 0–6 Hutchison Vale (19 August 2023); Tynecastle 1–7 Musselburgh Athletic (22 August 2023)
- Highest scoring: Inverkeithing Hillfield Swifts 3–7 Broxburn Athletic (9 September 2023)
- Longest winning run: 7 matches: Sauchie Juniors
- Longest unbeaten run: 16 matches: Musselburgh Athletic
- Longest winless run: 16 matches: Kinnoull
- Longest losing run: 13 matches: Kinnoull
- All statistics correct as of 18 May 2024.

Broxburn Athletic won the East of Scotland League for the first time following a 2–3 defeat suffered by Musselburgh Athletic at Jeanfield Swifts on 1 May 2024, which left Musselburgh eight points behind with two games remaining. They were promoted to the 2024–25 Lowland Football League, beating Dalbeattie Star in the Lowland League play-off.

Location of teams in 2023–24 East of Scotland Football League Premier Division

Relegated from 2022–23 Premier Division:

- Blackburn United
- Oakley United
- Vale of Leithen

Promoted to 2023–24 Premier Division:

- Dunbar United
- Glenrothes
- Luncarty
- Kinnoull

=== Stadia and locations ===
Team	Location	Home ground	Surface	Capacity	Seats
Broxburn Athletic ^{[SFA]}	Broxburn	Albyn Park	Artificial	2,050	0
Crossgates Primrose	Crossgates	Humbug Park	Grass	1,500	0
Dunbar United ^{[SFA]}	Dunbar	New Countess Park	Grass	1,200	191
Dundonald Bluebell ^{[SFA]}	Cardenden	Moorside Park	Grass	1,000	0
Glenrothes	Glenrothes	Warout Stadium	Grass	2,000	730
Haddington Athletic ^{[SFA]}	Haddington	Millfield Park	Grass	1,200	0
Hill of Beath Hawthorn ^{[SFA]}	Hill of Beath	Keir's Park	Grass	1,080	0
Hutchison Vale ^{[SFA]}	Pilton, Edinburgh	Ainslie Park (Note: Hutchison Vale ground-shared with The Spartans.)	Artificial	3,534	854
Inverkeithing Hillfield Swifts	Dalgety Bay	Dalgety Bay Sports & Leisure Centre	Artificial	800	0
Jeanfield Swifts ^{[SFA]}	Perth	Riverside Stadium	Grass	1,000	0
Kinnoull	Perth	Tulloch Park	Grass	1,000	0
Luncarty	Luncarty	Brownlands Park	Grass	1,000	0
Musselburgh Athletic ^{[SFA]}	Musselburgh	Olivebank Stadium	Grass	1,500	0
Penicuik Athletic ^{[SFA]}	Penicuik	Montgomery Park	Grass	1,500	0
Sauchie Juniors ^{[SFA]}	Sauchie	Beechwood Park	Grass	2,500	200
Tynecastle ^{[SFA]}	Slateford, Edinburgh	Meggetland Sports Complex	Grass	3,000	500

Notes

All grounds are equipped with floodlights, except Humbug Park (Crossgates Primrose), Warout Stadium (Glenrothes), Brownlands Park (Luncarty).

=== League table ===
Pos	Team	Pld	W	D	L	GF	GA	GD	Pts	Promotion, qualification or relegation
1	Broxburn Athletic (C, O, P)	30	23	5	2	82	36	+46	74	Qualification for the Lowland League play-off
2	Musselburgh Athletic	30	19	6	5	69	30	+39	63	
3	Jeanfield Swifts	30	18	6	6	80	37	+43	60	
4	Dunbar United	30	18	2	10	69	44	+25	56	
5	Hutchison Vale	30	18	1	11	72	46	+26	55	
6	Sauchie Juniors	30	17	3	10	66	48	+18	54	
7	Hill of Beath Hawthorn	30	15	5	10	57	50	+7	50	
8	Haddington Athletic	30	13	5	12	59	40	+19	44	
9	Dundonald Bluebell	30	12	7	11	63	60	+3	43	
10	Tynecastle	30	10	7	13	58	61	−3	37	
11	Penicuik Athletic	30	10	5	15	51	66	−15	35	
12	Luncarty	30	9	1	20	46	79	−33	28	
13	Glenrothes (Note: Glenrothes deducted 3 points for fielding an ineligible, underage player in their 0–5 defeat against Jeanfield Swifts.)	30	8	6	16	57	84	−27	27	
14	Inverkeithing Hillfield Swifts (R)	30	7	3	20	41	82	−41	24	Relegation to the First Division
15	Crossgates Primrose (R)	30	5	5	20	33	69	−36	20	Relegation to the First Division
16	Kinnoull (R)	30	3	3	24	26	97	−71	12	Relegation to the First Division

Source: eosfl.com
Rules for classification: 1) Points; 2) Goal difference; 3) Number of goals scored
(C) Champions; (O) Play-off winners; (P) Promoted; (R) Relegated

=== Results ===
Home \ Away	BRX	CRS	DNB	DBL	GLE	HAD	HOB	HUT	IHS	JFS	KIN	LUN	MUS	PEN	SAU	TYN
Broxburn Athletic		3–2	0–3	4–3	2–1	0–0	1–1	4–3	5–2	3–1	6–0	6–0	2–2	2–0	2–1	5–0
Crossgates Primrose	1–4		1–2	1–2	1–1	1–4	0–3	1–4	3–2	1–2	1–1	2–0	0–1	1–1	1–2	1–3
Dunbar United	1–2	2–1		4–1	2–3	2–1	1–2	1–0	4–0	1–3	4–1	5–1	0–2	2–3	1–1	2–1
Dundonald Bluebell	1–3	3–0	4–0		2–2	2–2	1–3	3–1	1–2	2–2	5–0	1–0	2–2	1–5	0–3	6–1
Glenrothes	3–2	2–0	2–5	2–4		0–1	0–3	0–2	4–1	0–5	1–0	2–2	1–2	6–0	2–3	4–4
Haddington Athletic	0–1	3–1	0–1	2–2	7–0		3–4	0–2	3–1	1–2	5–0	4–0	1–2	3–1	2–3	0–2
Hill of Beath Hawthorn	1–2	2–3	1–3	1–0	3–3	0–3		1–3	2–1	3–2	2–1	5–0	0–0	2–1 (Note: The original fixture finished 1–0 to Penicuik Athletic, but the match was replayed as Penicuik Athletic made too many substitutions during the match.)	0–3	2–1
Hutchison Vale	1–2	3–0	2–3	4–2	4–1	0–1	2–1		7–1	3–2	3–0	2–1	2–1	2–4	3–1	1–2
Inverkeithing Hillfield Swifts	3–7	1–1	2–1	2–5	4–2	0–2	1–3	1–3		1–3	1–2	1–2	0–4	2–0	4–1	2–2
Jeanfield Swifts	1–1	5–0	1–1	4–0	3–3	3–0	1–1	2–2	3–1		4–3	0–1	3–2	2–1	4–1	5–0
Kinnoull	0–3	0–1	0–5	1–3	1–4	2–5	1–3	0–6	0–2	1–5		3–2	0–4	0–0	1–2	0–0
Luncarty	1–2	5–3	4–2	2–3	4–1	1–0	2–3	6–3	3–1	0–4	3–2		1–2	2–3	0–5	0–1
Musselburgh Athletic	1–3	1–1	1–0	4–0	4–1	4–2	1–1	2–0	4–0	1–0	1–2	1–0		6–2	2–1	2–2
Penicuik Athletic	0–1	1–3	0–1	1–2	5–1	1–1	2–1	3–2	1–1	1–3	5–1	4–1	1–3		1–2	1–1
Sauchie Juniors	1–1	2–0	2–7	1–1	7–2	1–2	3–2	0–1	4–0	2–1	5–1	4–2	1–0	2–3		1–0
Tynecastle	2–3	4–1	2–3	1–1	1–3	1–1	5–1	0–1	0–1	0–4	6–2	4–0	1–7	9–0	2–1	

Source: East of Scotland Fixture List
Legend: Blue = home team win; Yellow = draw; Red = away team win.

== First Division ==
Location of teams in 2023–24 East of Scotland Football League First Division

Dunipace won the league title on 14 May 2024, following a 0–1 defeat for St Andrews United at Newtongrange Star – which meant that Dunipace, who had played all their games, could not be caught.

Relegated from 2022–23 First Division:

- Burntisland Shipyard
- Coldstream
- Kennoway Star Hearts

Promoted to 2023–24 First Division:

- Whitburn
- St Andrews United
- Heriot-Watt University
- Arniston Rangers

=== Stadia and locations ===
Team	Location	Home ground	Surface	Capacity	Seats	Floodlit
Arniston Rangers	Gorebridge	Newbyres Park	Grass	1,500	0	No
Blackburn United ^{[SFA]}	Blackburn	New Murrayfield Park	Artificial	1,500	0	Yes
Camelon Juniors ^{[SFA]}	Camelon	Carmuirs Park	Grass	2,000	100	Yes
Dunipace ^{[SFA]}	Denny	Westfield Park	Artificial	1,000	0	Yes
Heriot-Watt University	Riccarton, Edinburgh	John Brydson Arena	Artificial	250	195	Yes
Kirkcaldy & Dysart	Kirkcaldy	Denfield Park	Grass	1,200	20	No
Leith Athletic	Edinburgh	Meadowbank Stadium	Artificial	1,748	499	Yes
Lochore Welfare	Crosshill	Central Park	Grass	1,200	0	No
Newtongrange Star ^{[SFA]}	Newtongrange	New Victoria Park	Grass	2,275	30	Yes
Oakley United	Oakley	Blairwood Park	Grass	1,500	0	No
Preston Athletic ^{[SFA]}	Prestonpans	Pennypit Park	Grass	1,500	313	Yes
Rosyth	Rosyth	Fleet Grounds	Artificial	300	0	Yes
St Andrews United ^{[SFA]}	St Andrews	Recreation Park	Grass	766	0	Yes
Vale of Leithen ^{[SFA]}	Innerleithen	Victoria Park	Grass	1,000	0	Yes
Whitburn	Whitburn	Central Park	Grass	2,000	38	No
Whitehill Welfare ^{[SFA]}	Rosewell	Ferguson Park	Grass	2,454	192	Yes

=== League table ===
Pos	Team	Pld	W	D	L	GF	GA	GD	Pts	Promotion or relegation
1	Dunipace (C, P)	28	21	3	4	78	29	+49	66	Promotion to the Premier Division
2	St Andrews United (P)	28	21	0	7	75	38	+37	63	Promotion to the Premier Division
3	Whitburn (P)	28	18	3	7	71	38	+33	57	Promotion to the Premier Division
4	Camelon Juniors	28	17	3	8	72	36	+36	54	
5	Newtongrange Star	28	16	5	7	64	38	+26	53	
6	Heriot-Watt University	28	12	5	11	46	41	+5	41	
7	Preston Athletic	28	12	5	11	49	55	−6	41	
8	Leith Athletic (Note: Leith Athletic deducted 3 points for fielding an ineligible player in their 1–5 defeat against Preston Athletic.)	28	11	7	10	63	45	+18	37	
9	Kirkcaldy & Dysart	28	11	4	13	58	51	+7	37	
10	Blackburn United	28	10	6	12	45	56	−11	36	
11	Whitehill Welfare	28	10	4	14	53	56	−3	34	
12	Arniston Rangers	28	10	4	14	51	60	−9	34	
13	Lochore Welfare	28	9	5	14	41	63	−22	32	
14	Oakley United (R)	28	3	4	21	29	80	−51	13	Relegation to the Second Division
15	Vale of Leithen (Note: Vale of Leithen deducted 3 points for fielding an ineligible player in their 2–6 defeat against Arniston Rangers.) (R)	28	0	0	28	29	138	−109	−3	Relegation to the Second Division
16	Rosyth (R)	0	0	0	0	0	0	0	0	Withdrawn; record expunged

Source: eosfl.com
Rules for classification: 1) Points; 2) Goal difference; 3) Number of goals scored
(C) Champions; (P) Promoted; (R) Relegated

=== Results ===
Home \ Away	ARN	BLU	CML	DPC	HER	KDY	LEI	LOW	NGS	OAK	PRE	ROS	STA	VOL	WHB	WHI
Arniston Rangers		0–0	2–4	1–2	1–3	0–0	3–2	0–0	1–0	0–2	3–0		3–4	2–1	0–2	4–1
Blackburn United	5–2		2–1	2–1	4–2	3–1	3–2	0–3	0–4	5–1	1–1		1–2	3–1	2–3	1–3
Camelon Juniors	3–0	3–0		2–4	3–2	2–0	2–1	3–0	4–1	4–0	0–1		6–1	5–0	1–2	5–3
Dunipace	5–0	4–0	2–1		2–1	5–2	1–1	3–1	1–0	4–2	4–1		3–0	9–0	4–2	4–2
Heriot-Watt University	3–1	1–1	2–0	1–2		1–2	2–2	1–2	1–1	2–0	2–3		2–1	2–1	1–1	1–0
Kirkcaldy & Dysart	5–3	3–1	2–2	4–1	0–1		1–2	3–2	1–1	3–1	2–3		1–3	7–0	1–2	3–4
Leith Athletic	1–3	3–1	0–1	1–2	0–0	3–0		6–0	2–2	4–1	2–2		1–0	5–1	2–4	4–1
Lochore Welfare	1–1	0–0	1–3	1–0	1–3	2–2	1–2		3–3	3–1	2–1		2–4	4–1	0–5	2–0
Newtongrange Star	1–2	3–1	2–0	0–1	1–3	3–2	2–1	5–1		2–2	2–0		1–0	5–1	4–1	3–1
Oakley United	0–4	0–3	3–3	1–2	1–3	1–4	2–2	0–2	1–3		0–1		0–2	2–1	0–4	1–1
Preston Athletic	3–5	1–1	0–7	1–1	3–2	0–1	5–1	2–1	0–1	3–1			1–2	4–2	3–1	1–0
Rosyth																
St Andrews United	3–2	7–0	2–1	1–0	1–0	0–3	0–1	8–1	5–4	6–0	2–1			3–0	1–0	1–0
Vale of Leithen	2–6	2–4	1–3	0–8	1–2	2–4	1–10	1–4	1–6	1–4	3–4		0–7		1–10	0–4
Whitburn	2–1	0–0	0–1	1–1	4–1	1–0	2–0	3–1	1–2	4–1	4–2		2–3	6–3		1–0
Whitehill Welfare	5–1	2–1	2–2	0–2	2–1	2–1	2–2	2–0	1–2	4–1	2–2		2–6	5–1	2–3	

Source: East of Scotland Football League
Legend: Blue = home team win; Yellow = draw; Red = away team win.

== Second Division ==
Location of teams in 2023–24 East of Scotland Football League Second Division

The league title went down to the final day of the season, with Bo'ness Athletic and Thornton Hibs separated by one point. Despite a 21-match winning run for Thornton Hibs to end the season, Bo'ness Athletic's 4–0 home victory over Dalkeith Thistle was enough for the honours.

Relegated from 2022–23 Second Division:

- Craigroyston
- Hawick Royal Albert
- Lochgelly Albert
- Syngenta (folded)

Promoted to 2023–24 Second Division:

- Bo'ness Athletic
- Armadale Thistle
- Edinburgh College

=== Stadia and locations ===
Team	Location	Home ground	Surface	Capacity	Seats	Floodlit
Armadale Thistle	Armadale	Volunteer Park	Artificial	2,000	300	Yes
Burntisland Shipyard ^{[SFA]}	Burntisland	Recreation Park	Grass	1,000	0	Yes
Bo'ness Athletic	Bo'ness	Newtown Park	Artificial	2,000	0	Yes
Coldstream ^{[SFA]}	Coldstream	Home Park	Grass	1,000	0	Yes
Dalkeith Thistle ^{[SFA]}	Dalkeith	King's Park	Grass	1,500	0	Yes
Easthouses Lily Miners Welfare ^{[SFA]}	Easthouses	Newbattle Complex	Grass	1,500	100	Yes
Edinburgh College	Edinburgh	Riccarton Campus (Note: Edinburgh College ground-shared with Heriot-Watt University.)	Artificial	250	195	Yes
Edinburgh South	Colinton, Edinburgh	Paties Road Stadium (Note: Edinburgh South ground-shared with Edinburgh United.)	Grass	1,200	200	No
Edinburgh United	Colinton, Edinburgh	Paties Road Stadium	Grass	1,200	200	No
Kennoway Star Hearts	Star	Treaton Park	Grass	1,000	0	No
Newburgh	Newburgh	East Shore Park	Grass	1,000	0	No
Ormiston Primrose	Ormiston	New Recreation Park	Grass	1,000	0	No
Peebles Rovers	Peebles	Whitestone Park	Grass	1,250	250	No
Stirling University reserves	Stenhousemuir	Ochilview Park (Note: Stirling University reserves ground-shared with Stenhousemuir.)	Artificial	3,746	626	Yes
Thornton Hibs	Thornton	Memorial Park	Grass	1,500	0	No
Tweedmouth Rangers	Berwick-upon-Tweed	Shielfield Park (Note: Tweedmouth Rangers ground-shared with Berwick Rangers.)	Grass	4,099	1,366	Yes

=== League table ===
Pos	Team	Pld	W	D	L	GF	GA	GD	Pts	Promotion or relegation
1	Bo'ness Athletic (C, P)	30	27	0	3	139	32	+107	81	Promotion to the First Division
2	Thornton Hibs (P)	30	26	2	2	101	27	+74	80	Promotion to the First Division
3	Edinburgh South (P)	30	20	4	6	72	45	+27	64	Promotion to the First Division
4	Armadale Thistle	30	20	2	8	83	40	+43	62	
5	Edinburgh College	30	15	6	9	68	58	+10	51	
6	Peebles Rovers	30	14	4	12	58	61	−3	46	
7	Stirling University reserves	30	15	0	15	64	60	+4	45	
8	Dalkeith Thistle	30	13	2	15	65	60	+5	41	
9	Kennoway Star Hearts	30	12	4	14	54	60	−6	40	
10	Easthouses Lily Miners Welfare	30	12	2	16	62	84	−22	38	
11	Coldstream	30	11	4	15	47	68	−21	37	
12	Tweedmouth Rangers	30	10	2	18	47	68	−21	32	
13	Burntisland Shipyard	30	9	5	16	48	71	−23	32	
14	Ormiston Primrose (R)	30	6	2	22	48	104	−56	20	Relegation to the Third Division
15	Newburgh (R)	30	3	2	25	36	102	−66	11	Relegation to the Third Division
16	Edinburgh United (Note: Edinburgh United deducted 9 points for fielding an ineligible player in their March 2024 defeats against Edinburgh South, Bo'ness Athletic and Easthouses Lily Miners Welfare.) (R)	30	5	3	22	40	92	−52	9	Relegation to the Third Division

Source: eosfl.com
Rules for classification: 1) Points; 2) Goal difference; 3) Number of goals scored
(C) Champions; (P) Promoted; (R) Relegated

=== Results ===
Home \ Away	ARM	BOA	BUR	COL	DAL	ELM	EDC	EDS	EDN	KSH	NEW	ORM	PEE	STI	THO	TWE
Armadale Thistle		0–2	4–0	4–3	5–0	3–2	4–0	2–2	7–0	1–3	5–3	3–2	4–2	3–1	1–2	4–0
Bo'ness Athletic	2–1		5–1	7–0	4–0	5–2	7–0	4–0	6–0	7–2	10–0	6–0	5–1	4–3	1–5	4–1
Burntisland Shipyard	0–3	0–3		0–1	1–4	3–2	3–1	0–0	4–3	0–2	1–1	5–1	2–3	2–4	3–7	4–3
Coldstream	2–1	0–5	1–0		0–4	2–3	2–2	1–4	1–1	1–0	1–0	2–1	5–0	1–3	1–2	2–2
Dalkeith Thistle	0–1	3–5	4–1	3–1		1–2	2–2	1–2	2–0	2–3	4–2	1–3	1–2	0–1	6–0	2–1
Easthouses Lily Miners Welfare	2–6	2–5	3–3	1–3	3–2		1–4	1–2	3–2	6–5	1–0	2–2	1–2	2–1	1–3	3–0 (Note: Match played at Albyn Park, Broxburn.)
Edinburgh College	2–2	1–4	4–1	3–0	2–1	4–0		4–2	3–2	2–2	5–2	4–3	1–1	2–3	1–2 (Note: Match played at Meadowbank Stadium.)	3–1
Edinburgh South	3–0	0–5	1–0	2–1	2–0	2–3 (Note: Match played at Albyn Park, Broxburn, due to a waterlogged pitch at Paties Road.)	2–1		4–2	1–0	2–1	4–2	3–3	1–2	2–2	3–0
Edinburgh United	0–3	0–7	1–2	0–2	1–2	1–3	3–3	2–3		0–4	1–1	3–1	1–2	0–4	0–5	2–4
Kennoway Star Hearts	0–2	0–2	0–0	2–1	2–2	3–2	1–2	1–3	1–3		2–3	4–0	1–4	2–1	0–1	2–1
Newburgh	2–4	0–9	1–3	2–1	0–1	0–2	1–3	1–2	2–6	2–4		0–4	1–4	2–3	0–7	2–4
Ormiston Primrose	0–5	0–4	1–4	3–4	2–6	7–0	2–1	2–12	0–2	2–2	3–2		0–1	0–3	0–4	0–3
Peebles Rovers	1–2	2–3	0–2	2–2	1–5	3–2	1–2	1–3	3–1	2–0	2–1	4–0		4–0	1–4	1–1
Stirling University reserves	2–0	2–1	5–2	4–2	2–5	6–1	1–2	2–3	2–0	1–2	2–1	4–5	1–4		1–4	0–2
Thornton Hibs	0–2	4–2	0–0	5–0	5–0	4–1	2–0	1–0	8–1 (Note: Match played at Bayview Stadium, Methil, due to an unplayable pitch at Memorial Park.)	4–0	6–1	6–2	3–0	1–0		2–0
Tweedmouth Rangers	2–1	2–5	3–1	2–4	4–1	0–5	0–4	0–2	0–2	2–4	0–2	3–0	4–1	2–0	0–2	

Source: East of Scotland Football League
Legend: Blue = home team win; Yellow = draw; Red = away team win.

== Third Division ==
Location of teams in 2023–24 East of Scotland Football League Third Division
Location of teams in 2023–24 East of Scotland Football League Third Division within West Lothian

West Calder United won the league title with a round of matches to spare, following a 2–1 victory over Harthill Royal on 14 May 2024.

Transferred from Lothian & Edinburgh Amateur League

- Linton Hotspur

=== Stadia and locations ===
Club	Location	Home Ground	Surface	Capacity	Seats	Floodlit
Bathgate Thistle	Bathgate	Creamery Park	Grass	2,000	0	Yes
Edinburgh Community	Warriston, Edinburgh	St Mark's Park	Grass	1,000	0	No
Fauldhouse United	Fauldhouse	Park View	Grass	1,500	80	No
Harthill Royal	Harthill	Gibbshill Park	Grass	1,800	0	No
Hawick Royal Albert ^{[SFA]}	Hawick	Albert Park	Grass	1,000	500	Yes
Linton Hotspur	West Linton	New Moor Road	Grass	1,000	63	No
Livingston United	Livingston	Station Park	Grass	1,500	0	No
Lochgelly Albert	Lochgelly	Gardiners Park	Grass	1,500	0	No
Pumpherston	Pumpherston	Recreation Park	Grass	1,500	0	No
Stoneyburn	Stoneyburn	Beechwood Park	Grass	1,500	0	No
West Calder United	West Calder	Hermand Park	Grass	1,000	0	No

=== League table ===
Pos	Team	Pld	W	D	L	GF	GA	GD	Pts	Promotion
1	West Calder United (C, P)	30	24	2	4	85	25	+60	74	Promotion to the Second Division
2	Bathgate Thistle (P)	30	22	4	4	82	32	+50	70	Promotion to the Second Division
3	Harthill Royal (P)	30	17	5	8	73	42	+31	56	Promotion to the Second Division
4	Stoneyburn	30	16	4	10	53	45	+8	52	
5	Pumpherston	30	13	7	10	60	51	+9	46	
6	Lochgelly Albert	30	14	3	13	71	64	+7	45	
7	Fauldhouse United (Note: Fauldhouse United deducted 2 points for fielding an ineligible player in their game against Edinburgh Community – originally a 3–3 draw, the game was awarded 1–0 to Edinburgh Community.)	30	13	5	12	51	43	+8	42	
8	Hawick Royal Albert	30	12	2	16	48	62	−14	38	
9	Edinburgh Community	30	8	4	18	43	73	−30	28	
10	Linton Hotspur	30	4	0	26	31	94	−63	12	
11	Livingston United	30	2	4	24	31	97	−66	10	

Source: eosfl.com
Rules for classification: 1) Points; 2) Goal difference; 3) Number of goals scored
(C) Champions; (P) Promoted

=== Results ===
Home \ Away	BAT	ECF	FAU	HAR	HAW	LIN	LIV	LOC	PUM	STO	WCU
Bathgate Thistle		1–0	4–2	2–0	1–2	4–1	6–0	2–3	5–3	3–1	0–2
Bathgate Thistle			4–1		2–0	4–1			3–2		2–1
Edinburgh Community	2–2		1–1	1–2	2–1	4–2	2–2	0–2	0–4	0–1	0–5
Edinburgh Community	1–5		1–0 (Note: Match initially finished 3–3; later awarded 1–0 to Edinburgh Community as Fauldhouse United fielded an ineligible player.)			4–2			1–3	2–3	
Fauldhouse United	0–1	1–0		1–2	2–1	2–1	3–2	3–3	2–4	0–1	2–0
Fauldhouse United				4–0	1–0		3–1	3–2			0–2
Harthill Royal	0–1	4–2	2–2		3–0	5–0	6–0	1–2	3–2	5–1	0–0
Harthill Royal	2–1	2–3				3–2	2–2			2–0	
Hawick Royal Albert	1–4	2–1 (Note: The original fixture finished 3–1 to Edinburgh Community, but the match was replayed as Edinburgh Community made too many substitutions during the match.)	1–0	1–4		3–1	3–3	3–0	2–1	1–2	1–5
Hawick Royal Albert		4–2		1–5			1–0	0–2			1–5
Linton Hotspur	0–2	2–0	0–4	0–3	1–3		3–0	4–5	0–7	0–4	0–3
Linton Hotspur			0–3		2–1			2–3	1–2		1–4
Livingston United	2–5	0–4	0–1	1–5	1–4	2–3		0–2	2–3	0–4	2–4
Livingston United	0–4	1–2				3–1			3–1	1–4	
Lochgelly Albert	0–4	2–3	2–1	4–5	2–2	6–0	4–0		4–2	1–5	2–3
Lochgelly Albert	3–3	4–1		1–3			3–0			3–1	
Pumpherston	1–1	3–2	1–1	2–2	1–3	2–0	3–1	3–2		0–0	3–1
Pumpherston			2–2	0–0	1–0			1–0			1–5
Stoneyburn	0–3	1–1	1–6	1–0	2–5	1–0	2–2	4–2	2–0		0–2
Stoneyburn	0–2		3–0		3–0	4–0			1–1		
West Calder United	1–1	4–1	1–0	3–1	3–1	3–1	6–0	3–1	2–1	0–1	
West Calder United		7–0		2–1			3–0	2–1		3–0	

Source: East of Scotland Football League
Legend: Blue = home team win; Yellow = draw; Red = away team win.

== Notes ==
^{SFA} Club with an SFA licence; eligible to participate in the Lowland League promotion play-off (should they win the Premier Division), and also compete in the Scottish Cup.
