= Craig Martin =

Craig Martin may refer to:

- Craig Martin (Canadian soccer) (born 1957), former Canadian national soccer team player
- Craig Martin (footballer, born 1971), Scottish football defender
- Craig Martin (footballer, born 1978), Scottish football defender
- Craig Martin (South African soccer) (born 1993), South African soccer player
- Craig Martin (ice hockey) (born 1971), retired Canadian professional ice hockey player
- Craig L. Martin, chief executive officer of Jacobs Engineering Group

== See also ==
- Crag martin, four species of birds in the swallow family
- Michael Craig-Martin (born 1941), British contemporary artist
