= 2021–22 Lowland Football League =

Lowland League
- Season: 2021–22
- Dates: 17 July 2021 – 10 May 2022
- Champions: Bonnyrigg Rose Athletic
- Promoted: Bonnyrigg Rose Athletic
- Relegated: Vale of Leithen
- Matches: 306
- Goals: 1,133 (3.7 per match)
- Biggest home win: Berwick Rangers 11–0 Vale of Leithen (9 October 2021)
- Biggest away win: Vale of Leithen 0–13 Bonnyrigg Rose Athletic (6 October 2021)
- Highest scoring: Vale of Leithen 0–13 Bonnyrigg Rose Athletic (6 October 2021)
- Longest winning run: 11 matches: Bonnyrigg Rose Athletic
- Longest unbeaten run: 18 matches: Bonnyrigg Rose Athletic
- Longest winless run: 21 matches: Vale of Leithen
- Longest losing run: 16 matches: Vale of Leithen
- Highest attendance: 942; Bonnyrigg Rose Athletic 2–5 Rangers B (11 September 2021)
- All statistics correct as of 10 May 2022.

The 2021–22 Scottish Lowland Football League was the 9th season of the Lowland Football League, part of the fifth tier of the Scottish football pyramid system. Kelty Hearts were the reigning champions but were unable to defend their title after gaining promotion to Scottish League Two.

Bonnyrigg Rose Athletic won their first league title on 1 March 2022 thanks to a 5–0 win over Cumbernauld Colts at New Dundas Park, with five matches still to play. They faced the winners of the 2021–22 Highland Football League (Fraserburgh) in the Pyramid play-off, winning 3–2 on aggregate. Bonnyrigg Rose then defeated Cowdenbeath 4–0 on aggregate in the League Two play-off final to gain promotion to Scottish League Two.

== Teams ==
Location of teams in 2021–22 Scottish Lowland Football League

Celtic and Rangers were approached by the Lowland League for a proposal to admit "B" teams into the league for the 2021–22 season. The proposal was given provisional approval by the majority of member clubs, with the vote being confirmed at the league's AGM on 27 May 2021.

BSC Glasgow changed their name to Broomhill in July 2021.

The following teams changed division after the 2020–21 season.

=== From Lowland League ===
Promoted to League Two

- Kelty Hearts

=== To Lowland League ===
- Celtic B
- Rangers B

=== Stadia and locations ===
Team	Location	Stadium	Capacity	Seats
Berwick Rangers	Berwick-upon-Tweed	Shielfield Park	4,099	1,366
Bo'ness United	Bo'ness	Newtown Park	2,500	0
Bonnyrigg Rose Athletic	Bonnyrigg	New Dundas Park	2,200	0
Broomhill	Alloa	Recreation Park (Note: Broomhill are ground-sharing with Alloa Athletic due to the lack of a suitable venue in Glasgow.)	3,100	919
Caledonian Braves	Motherwell	Alliance Park	500	100
Celtic B	Airdrie	Excelsior Stadium (Note: Celtic B are ground-sharing with Airdrieonians.)	10,101	10,101
Civil Service Strollers	Edinburgh	Christie Gillies Park	1,569	100
Cumbernauld Colts	Cumbernauld	Broadwood Stadium	8,086	8,086
Dalbeattie Star	Dalbeattie	Islecroft Stadium	1,320	100
East Kilbride	East Kilbride	K Park	660	400
East Stirlingshire	Falkirk	Falkirk Stadium (Note: East Stirlingshire are ground-sharing with Falkirk.)	7,937	7,937
Edinburgh University	Edinburgh	New Peffermill Stadium	1,100	100
Gala Fairydean Rovers	Galashiels	3G Arena, Netherdale	2,000	500
Gretna 2008	Gretna	Raydale Park	1,030	138
Rangers B	Dumbarton	Dumbarton Football Stadium (Note: Rangers B are ground-sharing with Dumbarton.)	2,020	2,020
The Spartans	Edinburgh	Ainslie Park	3,612	534
University of Stirling	Stirling	Forthbank Stadium (Note: University of Stirling are ground-sharing with Stirling Albion.)	3,808	2,508
Vale of Leithen	Innerleithen	Victoria Park	1,500	0

Notes

All grounds are equipped with floodlights.

=== Personnel and kits ===
Team	Manager	Captain	Kit manufacturer	Shirt sponsor
Berwick Rangers	(Scotland) Stuart Malcolm	(Scotland) Jamie Pyper	Kappa	Thrive Learning
Bo'ness United	(Scotland) Max Christie	(Scotland) Stuart Hunter	Puma	Express Taxis
Bonnyrigg Rose Athletic	(Scotland) Robbie Horn	(Scotland) Jonathan Stewart	Puma	G. Fitzsimmons and Son
Broomhill	(Scotland) David Gormley	(Scotland) Ryan Sinnamon	Joma	Nicholson Accountancy
Caledonian Braves	(Scotland) Ricky Waddell	(Scotland) Ross Lindsay	Macron	Play
Celtic B	(Scotland) Tommy McIntyre	(Republic of Ireland) Bosun Lawal	Adidas	Dafabet
Civil Service Strollers	(Scotland) Gary Jardine	(Scotland) Mark McConnell	Joma	Pilton Community Health Project
Cumbernauld Colts	(Scotland) James Orr	(Scotland) Stephen O'Neill	Puma	Broden's Bar and Kitchen
Dalbeattie Star	(Scotland) Chris Jardine	(Scotland) Lee Wells	Adidas	Solway Plant Hire
East Kilbride	(Scotland) Kevin Rutkiewicz	(Scotland) Chris Millar	Joma	Document Solutions
East Stirlingshire	(Scotland) Derek Ure	(Scotland) Kieran Gibbons	EV2 Sportswear	EV2SPORTSWEAR.COM
Edinburgh University	(Scotland) Dorian Ogunro	(Scotland) Matthew Dick	PlayerLayer	TWEDEX
Gala Fairydean Rovers	(Scotland) Jimmy Scott	(Scotland) Gareth Rodger	Adidas	Five Star Taxis
Gretna 2008	(Northern Ireland) Stephen Hatfield		Joma	CLARKE ePos (UK) Ltd
Rangers B	(Scotland) David McCallum	(Northern Ireland) Kyle McClelland	Castore	Carrick Packaging
The Spartans	(Scotland) Douglas Samuel	(Scotland) Ian McFarland	Macron	Arthur McKay
Stirling University	(Scotland) Chris Geddes	(Scotland) James Berry	VSN	Mackay Clinic
Vale of Leithen	(Scotland) Michael Wilson	(Scotland) Michael Robertson	Adidas	BARC Travel

=== Managerial changes ===
Team	Outgoing manager	Manner of departure	Date of vacancy	Position in table	Incoming manager	Date of appointment
Vale of Leithen	(Scotland) Chris Anderson	Resigned	8 August 2021	18th	(Scotland) Alec Munro	14 August 2021
East Kilbride	(Scotland) Stephen Aitken	Resigned	10 August 2021	16th	(Scotland) Chris Aitken	10 August 2021
Gretna 2008	(Scotland) Rowan Alexander	Sacked	2 September 2021	15th	(Northern Ireland) Stephen Hatfield	6 October 2021
Vale of Leithen	(Scotland) Alec Munro	Stepped down	17 October 2021	18th	(Scotland) Grant Sandison	17 October 2021
Gala Fairydean Rovers	(Scotland) Neil Hastings	Left club	9 January 2022	9th	(Scotland) Jimmy Scott	9 January 2022
Vale of Leithen	(Scotland) Grant Sandison	Stepped down	5 March 2022	18th	(Scotland) Michael Wilson	9 March 2022
Dalbeattie Star	(Scotland) Ritchie Maxwell	Stepped down	18 March 2022	10th	(Scotland) Chris Jardine	18 March 2022

== League summary ==
=== League table ===
Pos	Team	Pld	W	D	L	GF	GA	GD	Pts	Qualification or relegation
1	Bonnyrigg Rose Athletic (C, O, P)	34	28	3	3	92	28	+64	87	Qualification for the Pyramid play-off
2	Rangers B	34	24	1	9	105	42	+63	73	Ineligible for promotion or relegation
3	Celtic B	34	23	4	7	82	30	+52	73	Ineligible for promotion or relegation
4	East Kilbride	34	22	5	7	92	40	+52	71	
5	The Spartans	34	20	6	8	69	45	+24	66	
6	East Stirlingshire	34	15	11	8	61	36	+25	56	
7	Civil Service Strollers	34	17	5	12	66	53	+13	56	
8	Berwick Rangers	34	17	3	14	75	46	+29	54	
9	Caledonian Braves	34	15	8	11	69	48	+21	53	
10	University of Stirling	34	13	6	15	66	68	−2	45	
11	Bo'ness United	34	13	6	15	54	60	−6	45	
12	Dalbeattie Star	34	14	1	19	53	65	−12	43	
13	Gala Fairydean Rovers	34	11	4	19	54	66	−12	37	
14	Cumbernauld Colts	34	10	5	19	53	73	−20	35	
15	Broomhill	34	10	4	20	42	66	−24	34	
16	Edinburgh University	34	8	7	19	54	92	−38	31	
17	Gretna 2008	34	2	5	27	36	109	−73	11	
18	Vale of Leithen (R)	34	1	2	31	10	166	−156	5	Relegation to the East of Scotland League

Rules for classification: 1) Points; 2) Goal difference; 3) Number of goals scored
(C) Champions; (O) Play-off winners; (P) Promoted; (R) Relegated

=== Positions by round ===
Qualification for the Pyramid play-off
Relegation to Tier 6

Team ╲ Round	1	2	3	4	5	6	7	8	9	10	11	12	13	14	15	16	17	18	19	20	21	22	23	24	25	26	27	28	29	30	31	32	33	34
Bonnyrigg Rose Athletic	5	6	8	4	3	3	1	1	1	1	1	1	1	1	1	1	1	1	1	1	1	1	1	1	1	1	1	1	1	1	1	1	1	1
Rangers B	3	2	1	3	6	5	3	2	2	2	2	2	2	2	3	4	2	2	2	3	2	2	2	2	2	2	3	3	4	4	4	4	4	2
Celtic B	12	14	14	9	12	6	6	7	6	7	8	8	6	7	10	9	6	6	7	6	6	5	5	4	5	3	4	4	3	2	2	3	3	3
East Kilbride	10	13	13	16	16	16	13	11	10	10	10	12	9	8	7	6	7	7	5	5	5	4	4	6	4	5	5	5	5	5	5	2	2	4
The Spartans	11	16	11	6	4	4	4	3	4	5	4	3	4	3	2	2	3	3	3	2	4	3	3	3	3	4	2	2	2	3	3	5	5	5
East Stirlingshire	2	1	3	7	5	7	8	8	8	8	7	6	7	6	5	5	5	5	6	7	7	7	7	8	8	7	8	8	8	8	8	8	7	6
Civil Service Strollers	14	8	4	2	2	1	2	5	3	3	3	5	3	4	4	3	4	4	4	4	3	6	6	5	6	6	6	6	6	6	6	7	8	7
Berwick Rangers	6	7	7	5	9	8	7	6	7	4	6	7	8	11	9	7	9	10	9	10	8	8	8	7	7	8	7	7	7	7	7	6	6	8
Caledonian Braves	13	17	12	12	8	11	12	10	9	9	9	9	11	10	12	12	11	11	12	11	11	11	11	11	9	10	10	9	9	9	9	9	9	9
University of Stirling	4	5	9	14	15	12	11	13	14	14	14	15	15	14	14	15	16	16	16	15	14	15	15	15	14	14	14	14	14	14	15	14	13	10
Bo'ness United	15	11	16	10	7	10	10	12	13	12	11	10	13	12	11	11	13	12	11	12	12	12	12	12	12	12	12	12	12	12	12	12	12	11
Dalbeattie Star	7	3	2	1	1	2	5	4	5	6	5	4	5	5	6	8	10	8	10	8	9	10	10	10	11	11	9	11	11	10	10	10	10	12
Gala Fairydean Rovers	17	12	10	15	10	9	9	9	11	11	12	11	10	9	8	10	8	9	8	9	10	9	9	9	10	9	11	10	10	11	11	11	11	13
Cumbernauld Colts	1	4	6	11	13	15	16	16	16	16	16	14	14	16	15	14	14	15	15	16	16	16	16	16	16	16	16	16	16	16	13	15	15	14
Broomhill	8	9	5	8	11	13	14	15	12	13	13	13	12	13	13	13	12	13	13	13	13	14	14	13	13	13	13	13	13	13	14	13	14	15
Edinburgh University	9	10	17	17	17	17	17	17	17	17	17	16	16	15	16	16	15	14	14	14	15	13	13	14	15	15	15	15	15	15	16	16	16	16
Gretna 2008	16	15	15	13	14	14	15	14	15	15	15	17	17	17	17	17	17	17	17	17	17	17	17	17	17	17	17	17	17	17	17	17	17	17
Vale of Leithen	18	18	18	18	18	18	18	18	18	18	18	18	18	18	18	18	18	18	18	18	18	18	18	18	18	18	18	18	18	18	18	18	18	18

== Results ==
Home \ Away	BER	BNS	BON	BRO	CAL	CEL	CSS	CUM	DAL	EKB	EAS	EDU	GFR	GRE	RAN	SPA	STI	VOL
Berwick Rangers		0–1	1–4	3–0	1–0	0–2	3–1	5–1	1–0	2–3	2–1	3–0	4–2	1–1	1–6	0–0	5–0	11–0
Bo'ness United	1–4		1–2	1–0	1–3	0–2	3–1	2–1	1–2	0–6	3–3	0–0	2–2	5–1	1–0	2–3	2–3	0–1
Bonnyrigg Rose Athletic	3–0	3–0		2–0	2–1	2–1	3–0	5–0	2–1	3–1	2–2	7–0	2–0	6–2	2–5	2–2	3–1	2–0
Broomhill	1–2	1–2	0–1		1–2	0–3	2–2	2–0	2–0	0–4	0–2	2–3	0–3	3–1	0–2	3–3	1–1	3–0
Caledonian Braves	3–1	1–1	1–2	3–0		2–3	1–2	3–0	0–2	0–7	2–2	1–1	0–0	4–0	2–2	1–1	4–1	4–0
Celtic B	2–0	4–1	1–2	4–2	2–0		3–1	2–2	1–0	1–1	0–1	3–0	2–0	1–0	0–1 (Note: Match played at Celtic Park.)	0–1	3–1	4–0
Civil Service Strollers	2–0	4–0	3–2	3–1	3–1	1–1		4–2	0–1	1–2	1–1	3–2	1–1	2–1	0–1	1–2	0–2	7–1
Cumbernauld Colts	1–0	4–1	0–0	1–2	1–4	0–2	3–1		2–4	0–3	0–0	4–3	2–3	4–4	2–3	0–1	1–6	4–0
Dalbeattie Star	1–2	1–2	2–0	3–2	0–2	2–4	1–0	3–1		1–4	1–3	3–1	1–2	3–1	2–0	1–3	1–2	4–0
East Kilbride	1–1	1–0	0–1	2–1	1–1	0–3	0–1	0–2	3–0		2–1	2–3	3–1	3–0	2–1	3–1	3–1	0–0
East Stirlingshire	2–1	2–2	0–1	0–1	1–1	0–1	1–1	2–0	3–0	4–5		2–0	0–1	4–2	0–1	0–0	1–1	1–0
Edinburgh University	1–4	1–6	0–2	2–2	1–3	0–6	1–2	4–2	3–3	4–4	0–3		1–1	1–0	0–3	1–2	4–4	3–0
Gala Fairydean Rovers	2–1	1–3	0–3	1–3	5–1	1–2	2–3	1–2	0–2	2–5	0–3	0–1		3–1	2–1	0–4	1–2	2–1
Gretna 2008	0–3	0–1	1–3	1–2	0–6	3–3	3–4	1–3	2–1	1–7	2–2 (Note: Match played at Galabank, Annan.)	0–4	0–3		1–5	1–4	1–4	1–1
Rangers B	1–0	2–0	1–2	5–1	3–1	3–0 (Note: Match played at Ibrox Stadium.)	1–3	1–4	4–3	2–1	0–2	8–2	5–2	9–1		7–1	5–0	9–0
The Spartans	2–1	0–1	1–2	2–0	1–2	2–1	4–2	1–0	5–2	0–3	2–3	4–0	2–1	2–1	0–2		1–1	8–0
University of Stirling	1–3	1–1	0–1	2–3	0–4	1–5	1–2	0–0	7–0	0–3	0–2	3–2 (Note: Match played at Ainslie Park, Edinburgh.)	3–1	2–0	4–0	0–2		5–0
Vale of Leithen	0–9	0–7	0–13	0–1	0–5	0–10	0–4	0–4	0–2	1–7	1–7	0–5	0–8	0–2	0–6	1–2	3–6	

Legend: Blue = home team win; Yellow = draw; Red = away team win.

== Lowland League play-off ==
A three-match round robin play-off took place between the winners of the 2021–22 East of Scotland Football League (Tranent Juniors), the 2021–22 South of Scotland Football League (St Cuthbert Wanderers), and the 2021–22 West of Scotland Football League (Darvel).

Pos	Team	Pld	W	PW	PL	L	GF	GA	GD	Pts	Promotion
1	Tranent Juniors (P)	2	2	0	0	0	9	0	+9	6	Promotion to the Lowland League
2	Darvel	2	1	0	0	1	3	3	0	3	
3	St Cuthbert Wanderers	2	0	0	0	2	1	10	−9	0	

Source: East of Scotland League
Rules for classification: 1) Points; 2) Goal difference; 3) Number of goals scored; 4) Result of head-to-head match; 5) Away goals scored; 6) League record points per game
(P) Promoted

22 May 2022	Tranent Juniors	7–0	St Cuthbert Wanderers	Tranent
15:00	McIntosh 26', 44', 65'; Miller 41'; Docherty 48'; Maughan 80', 86'			Stadium: Foresters Park; Attendance: 550; Referee: Daniel Graves

25 May 2022	St Cuthbert Wanderers	1–3	Darvel	Kirkcudbright
20:00	Williamson 68' (pen.)		McKenzie 4'; Kirkpatrick 29'; McShane 90'	Stadium: St Mary's Park; Attendance: 291; Referee: Alastair Grieve

28 May 2022	Darvel	0–2	Tranent Juniors	Darvel
14:00			McIntosh 40'; Docherty 84'	Stadium: Recreation Park; Attendance: 1,880; Referee: George Calder
