= 2022–23 Lowland Football League =

Scottish Football league season

Lowland League
- Season: 2022–23
- Dates: 22 July 2022 – 25 April 2023
- Champions: The Spartans
- Promoted: The Spartans
- Relegated: Dalbeattie Star
- Matches: 342
- Goals: 1,240 (3.63 per match)
- Biggest home win: Caledonian Braves 10–0 Dalbeattie Star (3 January 2023)
- Biggest away win: Edinburgh University 0–9 Hearts B (5 November 2022)
- Highest scoring: Caledonian Braves 10–0 Dalbeattie Star (3 January 2023)
- Longest winning run: 7 matches: Rangers B & The Spartans
- Longest unbeaten run: 19 matches: The Spartans
- Longest winless run: 22 matches: Dalbeattie Star
- Longest losing run: 21 matches: Edinburgh University
- All statistics correct as of 25 April 2023.

The 2022–23 Scottish Lowland Football League was the 10th season of the Lowland Football League, part of the fifth tier of the Scottish football pyramid system. Bonnyrigg Rose Athletic were the reigning champions, but were unable to defend their title following their promotion to Scottish League Two.

The Spartans won their third league title on 8 April 2023 thanks to a 2–0 win over Tranent Juniors at Foresters Park, with two matches still to play. They beat 2022–23 Highland Football League champions Brechin City on penalties after drawing 3–3 in the pyramid play-off and then beat Albion Rovers 2–1 in the final, being promoted to Scottish League Two for the 2023–24 season.

== Teams ==
Location of teams in 2022–23 Scottish Lowland Football League
Location of teams in 2022–23 Scottish Lowland Football League

Cowdenbeath became the third club to join the league via relegation from the SPFL, having lost the previous season's League Two play-off against Bonnyrigg Rose Athletic. East of Scotland League champions Tranent Juniors were promoted to the league, replacing founding league member Vale of Leithen who were relegated.

For the 2022–23 season, Broomhill were known as Open Goal Broomhill in a partnership with football media and podcast group Open Goal.

=== From Lowland League ===
Promoted to League Two

- Bonnyrigg Rose Athletic

Relegated to East of Scotland League

- Vale of Leithen

=== To Lowland League ===
- Heart of Midlothian B

Relegated from League Two

- Cowdenbeath

Promoted from East of Scotland League

- Tranent Juniors

=== Stadia and locations ===
Team	Location	Stadium	Capacity	Seats
Berwick Rangers	Berwick-upon-Tweed	Shielfield Park	4,099	1,366
Bo'ness United	Bo'ness	Newtown Park	2,500	0
Broomhill	Cumbernauld	Broadwood Stadium (Note: Broomhill are ground-sharing with Cumbernauld Colts.)	8,086	8,086
Caledonian Braves	Motherwell	Alliance Park	500	100
Celtic B	Airdrie	Excelsior Stadium (Note: Celtic B are ground-sharing with Airdrieonians.)	10,101	10,101
Civil Service Strollers	Edinburgh	Christie Gillies Park	1,569	100
Cowdenbeath	Cowdenbeath	Central Park	4,309	1,622
Cumbernauld Colts	Cumbernauld	Broadwood Stadium	8,086	8,086
Dalbeattie Star	Dalbeattie	Islecroft Stadium	1,320	100
East Kilbride	East Kilbride	K-Park	660	400
East Stirlingshire	Falkirk	Falkirk Stadium (Note: East Stirlingshire are ground-sharing with Falkirk.)	7,937	7,937
Edinburgh University	Edinburgh	New Peffermill Stadium	1,100	100
Gala Fairydean Rovers	Galashiels	3G Arena, Netherdale	2,000	500
Gretna 2008	Gretna	Raydale Park	1,030	138
Heart of Midlothian B	Rosewell	Ferguson Park (Note: Heart of Midlothian B are ground-sharing with Whitehill Welfare.)	2,614	192
Rangers B	Dumbarton	Dumbarton Football Stadium (Note: Rangers B are ground-sharing with Dumbarton.)	2,020	2,020
The Spartans	Edinburgh	Ainslie Park	3,612	534
Tranent Juniors	Tranent	Foresters Park	2,300	44
University of Stirling	Stirling	Forthbank Stadium (Note: University of Stirling are ground-sharing with Stirling Albion.)	3,808	2,508

Notes

All grounds are equipped with floodlights.

== League table ==
Pos	Team	Pld	W	D	L	GF	GA	GD	Pts	Qualification or relegation
1	The Spartans (C, O, P)	36	24	7	5	78	31	+47	79	Qualification for the Pyramid play-off
2	Rangers B	36	24	5	7	98	57	+41	77	Ineligible for promotion or relegation
3	Celtic B	36	23	7	6	96	45	+51	76	Ineligible for promotion or relegation
4	University of Stirling	36	22	5	9	82	45	+37	71	
5	Tranent Juniors	36	19	8	9	74	44	+30	65	
6	East Kilbride	36	19	7	10	81	53	+28	64	
7	Berwick Rangers	36	18	7	11	61	51	+10	61	
8	Civil Service Strollers	36	16	10	10	63	45	+18	58	
9	Bo'ness United	36	16	6	14	71	51	+20	54	
10	Caledonian Braves	36	15	6	15	79	67	+12	51	
11	Broomhill	36	15	6	15	73	73	0	51	
12	Gala Fairydean Rovers	36	15	4	17	63	74	−11	49	
13	Heart of Midlothian B	36	13	9	14	75	59	+16	48	Ineligible for promotion or relegation
14	Cumbernauld Colts	36	14	4	18	62	59	+3	46	
15	Cowdenbeath	36	10	6	20	46	50	−4	36	
16	East Stirlingshire	36	8	9	19	41	74	−33	33	
17	Gretna 2008	36	8	2	26	39	91	−52	26	
18	Edinburgh University	36	5	1	30	31	127	−96	16	
19	Dalbeattie Star (R)	36	1	5	30	27	144	−117	8	Relegation to the South of Scotland League

Source: SLFL BBC Sport Soccerway
Rules for classification: 1) Points; 2) Goal difference; 3) Number of goals scored
(C) Champions; (O) Play-off winners; (P) Promoted; (R) Relegated

== Results ==
Home \ Away	BER	BNS	BRO	CAL	CEL	CSS	COW	CUM	DAL	EKB	EAS	EDU	GFR	GRE	HEA	RAN	SPA	TRA	STI
Berwick Rangers		2–2	2–1	0–2	1–0	1–1	2–1	1–0	4–0	3–0	3–0	3–1	2–1	3–2	1–1	3–0	0–0	1–0	2–2
Bo'ness United	1–0		2–3	3–2	0–3	0–0	3–1	3–0	7–0	0–3	6–0	2–1	1–2	3–0	4–1	0–4	0–1	0–2	2–2
Broomhill	3–2	3–4		3–1	0–3	4–1	3–0	1–0	3–1	2–3	0–2	4–1	5–1	2–2	1–1	2–2	2–1	1–2	0–2
Caledonian Braves	3–2	0–2	2–3		0–1	3–1	1–0	2–1	10–0	2–2	1–1	5–0	2–2	6–0	3–2	3–3	2–4	2–3	1–0
Celtic B	1–3	2–1	6–2	4–4		4–0	3–1	1–1	5–0	1–2	2–1	5–0	2–4	3–1	2–0	5–2 (Note: Match played at Celtic Park.)	1–1	2–1	6–0
Civil Service Strollers	1–1	0–0	3–1	2–0	0–2		2–1	0–1	2–2	3–1	2–2	4–0	1–3	4–1	1–1	2–1	2–1	0–0	0–0
Cowdenbeath	0–4	1–1	0–3	1–0	0–3	1–2		1–0	1–1	1–3	5–0	3–0	1–2	3–0	3–1	1–2	0–1	0–0	2–0
Cumbernauld Colts	3–3	1–0	2–1	4–1	4–2	1–3	1–0		5–0	2–0	2–0	1–3	2–4	2–3	2–1	3–6	1–1	1–2	1–3
Dalbeattie Star	3–1	1–7	0–4	2–3	2–2	0–6	0–6 (Note: Match played at Galabank, Annan.)	2–5		1–2	2–2	1–3	1–4	0–3	0–0	2–5	0–4	0–2	1–6
East Kilbride	5–0	1–0	1–1	4–2	2–2	2–1	0–1	1–0	5–2		1–1	2–3	4–0	3–0	4–1	3–4	0–1	1–1	2–2
East Stirlingshire	1–4	2–1	1–0	1–1	0–3	1–3	0–0	2–3	5–1	1–0		3–0	0–1	3–1	0–2	2–3	1–4	2–2	0–2
Edinburgh University	0–1	0–5	1–4	0–1	2–4	0–3	0–5	0–6	4–0	1–6	1–1		2–3	3–1	0–9	0–3	1–3	1–4	0–4
Gala Fairydean Rovers	0–2	2–3	4–1	0–4	3–4	2–1	1–1	1–0	2–0	4–5	0–2	2–0		3–0	3–3	2–1	1–3	0–2	2–3
Gretna 2008	0–1	1–4	3–3	0–1	1–4	0–4	1–0	0–3	1–0	0–6	2–0	7–2	3–1		0–2	0–2	0–3	2–1	2–3
Heart of Midlothian B	6–0	2–0	2–3	2–5	1–1	2–2	1–1	2–1	4–0	4–1	5–0	3–0	3–0	2–1		2–3	0–0	2–3	2–4
Rangers B	3–0	4–1	5–2	2–0	1–3 (Note: Match played at Ibrox Stadium.)	3–1	3–2	2–2	6–1	0–0	4–1	3–1	4–1	2–1	2–3		3–0	2–0	3–2
The Spartans	3–2	2–0	2–2	5–1	2–2	1–0	1–0	3–0	6–0	2–3	3–1	3–0	4–1	3–0	1–0	3–1		1–1	4–0
Tranent Juniors	1–0	1–1	4–0	4–2	0–1	2–3	4–2	2–1	4–1	2–3	3–1	8–0	0–0	4–0	3–2	2–2	0–1		2–1
University of Stirling	3–1	1–2	4–0	3–1	2–1	0–2	1–0	2–0	5–0	2–0	1–1	5–0	2–1	2–0	4–0	1–2	3–0	5–2	

Legend: Blue = home team win; Yellow = draw; Red = away team win.

== Lowland League play-off ==
A three match round robin play-off was scheduled take place between the winners of the 2022–23 East of Scotland Football League, the 2022–23 South of Scotland Football League, and the 2022–23 West of Scotland Football League, subject to all three clubs meeting the required licensing criteria for promotion.

Linlithgow Rose qualified for the play-off as the winners of the East of Scotland Football League. As it transpired, both the winners of the South of Scotland Football League (Abbey Vale), and the West of Scotland Football League (Beith Juniors) were ineligible for the play-off as neither held an SFA club licence. Linlithgow Rose were therefore automatically promoted.
