= Syngenta F.C. =

Syngenta
- Full name: Syngenta Football Club
- Nickname(s): The Dyes
- Founded: 1960
- Dissolved: 2023
- Website: https://syngentafc.com/
Home colours	Away colours

Syngenta Football Club was a Scottish football club based in Grangemouth. They competed in the East of Scotland Football League and played their home games at Ochilview Park in Stenhousemuir; they folded midway through the 2022–23 season.

The club was founded in 1960 as ICI Juveniles, changing to Syngenta in November 2000.

Having run an adult team in the Stirling & District AFA, they applied to join the East of Scotland League for the 2019–20 season but were rejected due to concerns over the availability of Grangemouth Stadium. Instead, Syngenta successfully applied to join the SJFA East Region's Premier League South, groundsharing with Dunipace at Westfield Park. However they did not complete a full season due to the COVID-19 pandemic.

The club then made their move into the senior pyramid along with nine other SJFA East Region clubs after they were accepted into the East of Scotland League for 2021–22, this time groundsharing at Ochilview Park as part of a strategic partnership with Stenhousemuir. They finished as runners-up in Conference X and gained promotion to the newly formed Second Division for 2022–23.

In June 2022 Syngenta became a full SFA member having gained their club licence, allowing the club to take part in the Scottish Cup and Scottish Youth Cup. However during season 2022–23, Syngenta resigned from the league due to off-field disputes and their results were expunged in March 2023.
