= Craig Martin (footballer, born 1971) =

Scottish footballer (born 1971)

Personal information
- Full name: Craig Martin
- Date of birth: 16 April 1971 (age 55)
- Place of birth: Haddington, Scotland
- Position: Defender

Youth career
- 1988-1991: Hearts

Senior career*
Years	Team	Apps	(Gls)
1991-1994	Arbroath	92	(6)
1994-1995	Meadowbank Thistle	17	(1)
1995-1996	Livingston	1	(0)
- Whitehill Welfare
- * Club domestic league appearances and goals

Craig Martin (born 16 April 1971) is a Scottish footballer who played as a defender for Livingston.

== Playing career ==
He started his career in the youth ranks of Hearts, but left the club in 1991 without making a single first team appearance at Tynecastle Park.

Martin signed for Arbroath in 1991 and enjoyed a three year spell at Gayfield Park, making 92 league appearances and scoring 6 goals. One of those goals was against Meadowbank Thistle in a 3-2 victory on 20 November 1993.

In 1994, the defender signed for Meadowbank Thistle in a swap deal which saw Stuart Elder sign for Arbroath. He made 17 appearances for the club before they were renamed and relocated in 1995. He made one league appearance for Livingston before leaving in 1996.

Following his departure from the Almondvale Stadium, Martin signed for Whitehill Welfare. He scored in a Scottish Cup first round tie against Inverness Caledonian Thistle on 6 December 1997. His side ultimately lost the game 3-1.
