= Craig Martin (footballer, born 1978) =

Scottish Footballer

Personal information
- Date of birth: 10 November 1978 (age 47)
- Place of birth: Uphall, Scotland
- Position: Midfielder

Senior career*
Years	Team	Apps	(Gls)
1997–2001	Dunfermline	3	(0)
2000	→ Albion Rovers (loan)	7	(0)
2001	Stirling Albion	15	(1)
- Broxburn Athletic

Managerial career
- 2015–2022: Pumpherston
- * Club domestic league appearances and goals

Craig Martin (born 10 November 1978) is a Scottish former professional footballer who played as a defender for Dunfermline, Albion Rovers and Stirling Albion.

== Club career ==
=== Dunfermline ===
Martin made his professional debut for Dunfermline against Celtic in a 5–0 defeat on 19 December 1998, coming on as an 82nd minute substitute for Derek Ferguson. He went on to make 2 more appearances for the first team, his final game coming in a 2–2 draw at home to Dundee United.

=== Albion Rovers ===
Martin had a short loan spell at Albion Rovers who were managed by John McVeigh. He made 7 first team appearances for the Wee Rovers.

=== Stirling Albion ===
The midfielder eventually left Dunfermline to join Stirling Albion in 2001. He made 14 appearances for the Binos, scoring 1 goal which came in a 4–1 defeat to Berwick Rangers on 28 March 2001.

== Managerial career ==
Martin had a spell as manager of Pumpherston between 2015 and 2022. During this time, he guided his side to the Scottish Junior Football East Region Premier League South title in 2018–2019.

He left the post in 2022 and was replaced by Darren Pegg.
