= Bo'ness Athletic F.C. =

Association football club in Scotland

Bo'ness Athletic
- Full name: Bo'ness Athletic Football Club
- Founded: 2001 (as Linlithgow Thistle)
- Dissolved: 2026
- Ground: Newtown Park, Bo'ness
- Capacity: 2,500
- Manager: Willie Irvine
- 2025–26: East of Scotland League First Division, 6th of 16 (resigned)
- Website: bonessathletic.com

Bo'ness Athletic Football Club was a Scottish football club, based in the town of Bo'ness. The club was formed in 2001 as Linlithgow Thistle, and were known as Bo'ness United Juniors between 2019 and 2021.

They are members of the Scottish Junior Football Association and last played in the East of Scotland League.

The club played its home matches at Newtown Park, groundsharing with Bo'ness United of the Lowland League.

== History ==
The club were originally formed in 2001 in Linlithgow, and competed as Linlithgow Thistle in the Lothian and Edinburgh Amateur Football Association. In 2019, when Bo'ness United moved from the East Region Junior leagues into the East of Scotland Football League, Thistle relocated and changed their name to Bo'ness United Junior to maintain a Junior presence in the town. They only played a total of 26 matches at Junior level due cancellations from the COVID-19 pandemic, and in 2021 all the remaining clubs in the East Region Juniors located south of the River Tay moved en masse to the East of Scotland league. At that point the club was renamed Bo'ness Athletic and cut ties with Bo'ness United, with the older club's chairman expressing his concern at the prospect of there now being an ambitious rival organisation in the same league system based in their small town (albeit by then his club had been promoted further up the pyramid into the Lowland Football League).

Bo'ness Athletic earned their first honour by winning the EoSFL Third Division title in 2022–23, losing only once during the campaign, and also claimed the League Cup after defeating five opponents all playing at Premier or First Division level. After promotion they secured consecutive titles by winning the Second Division the following season in 2023–24. In 2024–25 they were promoted again for the third season in a row as runners-up of the First Division, and also won the King Cup.

In March 2026, the club announced that it plans to resign from the league and fold at the end of the 2025–26 season.

== Honours ==
- East of Scotland League
  - Second Division winners: 2023–24
  - Third Division winners: 2022–23
- East of Scotland League Cup: 2022–23
- Alex Jack Cup: 2023–24
- Cup-Winners Shield: 2023–24
- King Cup: 2024–25
