= Haddington Athletic F.C. =

Association football club in Scotland

- Full name: Haddington Athletic Football Club
- Nickname: The Hi-His
- Founded: 1939
- Ground: Millfield Park, Haddington
- Capacity: 1,500 (154 seated)
- Coordinates: 55°57′5″N 2°46′58″W
- Chairman: (Scotland) Drew Donaldson
- Manager: Scott Bonar
- League: East of Scotland League Premier Division
- 2025–26: East of Scotland League Premier Division, 7th of 16
- Website: http://www.haddingtonathletic.co.uk
Home colours	Away colours

Haddington Athletic Football Club are a Scottish football club based in Haddington, the county town of East Lothian. Nicknamed the Hi-His, the club were founded in 1939 and play their home matches at Millfield. The team competes in the East of Scotland League Premier Division, having moved from the junior leagues in 2018.

In July 2021, Scott Bonar became the manager of the club.

== History ==
After a number of years in the bottom tier of Junior football in the East Region, the club won the South Division in 2014–15 and gained promotion to the second tier. In 2017–18 Haddington achieved their best finish in the East Premier League, finishing 3rd in their final season before moving to the East of Scotland League.

The club gained SFA membership in 2020 after upgrades were made to the ground, which included the addition of floodlights.

== Honours ==
- East Of Scotland Football League First Division Conference A champions: 2021–22
- East Region South Division champions: 2014–15
- Lothians District League Division Two winners: 1998–99
- Edinburgh & District League champions: 1956–57
- East of Scotland Junior Cup winners: 1940–41, 1956–57, 1972–73
- Fife and Lothians Cup winners: 1940
- Brown Cup winners: 1958–59
- Thornton Shield winners: 1939–40, 1940–41, 1946–47
- St Michaels Cup winners: 1949–50, 1958–59
- Laidlaw Cup winners: 1978–79

== Notable former players ==
A number of players have used Haddington as a stepping stone to bigger and better things. The following players made the grade in the Senior game:

- John Scott to Third Lanark
- Johnny Gilhooley to Cowdenbeath
- Bobby Wood to Hibernian
- Dougie Armstrong and Tom McKenzie to Heart of Midlothian
- Alex McCrae to Heart of Midlothian (1941), Charlton Athletic (1947), Middlesbrough (1948), Falkirk (1953) and (as player/manager) Ballymena United (1957). He returned to Falkirk as manager in 1960.

November 2007 saw Polish midfielder Lukasz Rusin become the first Haddington player in recent times to seek success in the higher grade when he joined Brechin City for a short spell. However, his progression was hampered by a persistent injury and Rusin took some time away from the game before returning to Junior football with Spartans for the 2011–12 season

In July 2012, prolific striker Sean Jamieson signed for East Fife after a successful trial period. In two seasons for the Hi His, Jamieson scored 64 times in 72 appearances (three as substitute)

== Junior Internationalists ==
In 1948, Dougie Armstrong became the club's only Junior internationalist player when he played for Scotland against a Republic of Ireland team.

== Current squad ==
As of 31 October 2020

Note: Flags indicate national team as defined under FIFA eligibility rules; some limited exceptions apply. Players may hold more than one non-FIFA nationality.

No.	Pos.	Nation	Player
—	GK	POL	Mikolaj Komocki
—	DF	SCO	Ross King
—	DF	SCO	Craig Reid
—	FW	SCO	Guy McGarry
—	DF	SCO	Cammy Watson
—	DF	IRL	Conor Power
—	DF	SCO	Arran Bone (on loan from Civil Service Strollers)
—	DF	SCO	Seamus Russell
—	DF	SCO	Liam O'Donnell
—	DF	SCO	Ali Simpson
—	MF	SCO	Andy McNeill
—	MF	SCO	Shaun Hill

No.	Pos.	Nation	Player
—	MF	SCO	Callum Hamilton
—	MF	SCO	Aaron Conagalton
—	MF	SCO	Jamie Beaton
—	MF	SCO	Joe Hamill
—	MF	SCO	Keiran Grant
—	MF	SCO	Liam Kelly
—	MF	SCO	Robbie King
—	FW	SCO	Mike Johnston
—	FW	SCO	Gabri Auriemma
—	FW	SCO	Ryan Hutchison
—	FW	SCO	Tom Davies
—	FW	SCO	Euan Watson
—	FW	SCO	Ryan Cameron
—	FW	SCO	Fraser Eddington
