= Pumpherston F.C. =

Association football club in Scotland

Pumpherston
- Full name: Pumpherston Football Club
- Nickname: Pumphy or Ston
- Founded: 1896 (Re-formed 1990)
- Ground: Recreation Park; Drumshoreland Place; Pumpherston
- Capacity: 2,700
- Coordinates: 55°54′38″N 3°29′40″W
- Chairman: Billy Rogers
- Manager: Shaun Fagen & Liam Campbell
- League: East of Scotland League Second Division
- 2025–26: East of Scotland League Third Division, 5th of 11 (promoted)
Home colours	Away colours

Pumpherston Football Club are a Scottish football club based in Pumpherston, near Livingston, West Lothian. Their home ground is Recreation Park, with one of the largest pitches in Scottish football. The club colours are gold and black.

== History ==
The original Pumpherston club was formed in 1896.

A club by the name of Pumpherston Rob Roy were probably the first Junior club in the village, existing for a few years in the early 1900s before Pumpherston Rangers joined the Linlithgowshire Junior League for the 1911–12 season.

Success followed for the next three seasons with two East of Scotland Junior League titles, two Renton cup wins, two Leith Burgh Cup wins and a Dalmeny Cup. World War I intervened but they won the Renton Cup again in 1919 when football resumed. However, at the end of 1927–28 season with league re-organisation and the number of West Lothian clubs dwindling, they decided to turn amateur and leave the Juniors.

It was 26 years later than Pumpherston Juniors joined the Edinburgh & District League for season 1954–55. Their first success came in 1957 when they defeated Bonnyrigg Rose Athletic at Albyn Park to win the Thornton Shield and the following season they shocked Junior football by going all the way to the Scottish Junior Cup final under the leadership of captain Vince Halpin. On the way to the Final they defeated West Calder United, Dalkeith Thistle, Tranent, Thornton Hibs, and Parkhead. The Semi-Final against Baillieston in front of 10,000 at Brockville Park was drawn, but they won the replay at Celtic Park the following week to send them to Hampden Park, where they lost 2–0 to Shotts Bon Accord in front of 33,000.

They were a solid mid-table club but in 1962–63 they narrowly lost the West Section title to Sauchie who went on to win the play-off against Newtongrange Star, the same season they lost Brown Cup Final to Dunbar United. The following year also saw a third-place finish. They came from nowhere in 1969–70 to win the West Section, edging out Linlithgow Rose and Bo'ness United, but lost the Championship play-off to Mid/East Section winners Arniston Rangers.

The early 1970s saw erratic form, 1971–72 saw them finish third, the following season they were 15th and bottom, and the season after that, with the leagues re-organised into A and B Divisions they missed out on promotion by a single goal. They also had a run to the 5th round of the Scottish Junior Cup before being eliminated by Glasgow Perthshire.

However that was their last sniff of success as the financial situation at the club was deteriorating and midway through season 1976–77 they folded. The club was re-formed and joined the East Region in 1990–91, once again bringing Junior football back to Recreation Park.

The club had a few promotions and relegations in that time. In 2017/18 the club won their first silverware since reforming in 1990 winning the Premier South League. The following year they won the League and League cup double.They joined the East of Scotland pyramid system at tier 9 where they are playing at the moment in the Third Division

== Club staff ==
=== Board of directors ===
Role	Name
Chairman	(Scotland) Billy Rogers

=== Coaching staff ===
Role	Name
Co-managers	(Scotland) Shaun Fagen & Liam Campbell

== Current squad ==
As of 31 October 2022

Note: Flags indicate national team as defined under FIFA eligibility rules; some limited exceptions apply. Players may hold more than one non-FIFA nationality.

No.	Pos.	Nation	Player
—	GK	SCO	Jamie Bowman
—	GK	SCO	Connor Shaw
—	DF	SCO	Liam Campbell
—	DF	SCO	Adam Forrest
—	DF	SCO	Steven Fyffe
—	DF	SCO	Connor McQueenie
—	DF	SCO	Marcus Millar
—	DF	SCO	Hassan Nyang
—	MF	SCO	Michael Adams
—	MF	SCO	Darren Carroll
—	MF	SCO	Campbell Anthony

No.	Pos.	Nation	Player
—	MF	SCO	Josh Ewen
—	MF	SCO	Steven Fleming
—	MF	SCO	Jordan Laing
—	MF	SCO	Barry Nicholson
—	MF	SCO	Jordan Rodger
—	MF	SCO	Derek Shaw
—	MF	SCO	Mark Wilkins
—	FW	SCO	John Batt
—	FW	SCO	Kieran Sweeney
—	FW	SCO	Zander Murray

== Managerial history ==
Name	Nationality	Years
Colin White	(Scotland)	?-1958
Willie Wait	(Scotland)	1958-?
Vince Halpin^{p}	(Scotland)	1966-1969
Frank Donnelly	(Scotland)	1973-?
Allan Middleton	(Scotland)	?-2004
Steve Pittman	(United States)	2004-2008
Jimmy Dunn	(Scotland)	2008-2009
Roddy McDonald	(Scotland)	2009-2011
Derek Halcrow	(Scotland)	2011-2012
Robert Main	(Scotland)	2012-2013
Mattie Coulter	(Scotland)	2013-2014
Craig Martin	(Scotland)	2015-2022
Darren Pegg	(Scotland)	2022-2025
Stuart McInness	(Scotland)	2025-2026
Shaun Fagen & Liam Campbell	(Scotland)	2026-

^{p} Player managers.

== Honours ==
Pumpherston Rangers

- East of Scotland Junior League Champions: 1913–14, 1914–15
- Renton Cup: 1912–13, 1913–14, 1918–19
- Leith Burghs Cup: 1912–13, 1913–14
- Lumley Cup: 1912–13
- Dalmeny Cup: 1913–14
- St.Michaels Cup Runners-up: 1924–25
- Linlithgowshire County Cup Runners-up: 1926–27

Pumpherston Juniors

- Scottish Junior Cup Runners-up: 1957–58
- East Junior League West Division Champions: 1969–70
- Thornton Shield Winners: 1956–57
- Lothians Second Division Runners-up: 2003–04
- East Region South Division Runners-up: 2012–13
- RL Rae Cup Runners-up: 1960–61
- St.Michaels Cup Runners-up: 1960–61
- Brown Cup Runners-up: 1962–63
