= Luncarty F.C. =

Association football club in Scotland

Luncarty
- Full name: Luncarty Junior Football Club
- Nickname: The Bleachers
- Founded: 1886
- Ground: Brownlands Park, Main Road, Luncarty
- Capacity: 1,200
- Coordinates: 56°27′20″N 3°28′18″W
- Manager: Craig Mitchell
- League: East of Scotland League Second Division
- 2025–26: East of Scotland League First Division, 16th of 16 (relegated)
Home colours	Away colours

Luncarty Junior Football Club are a Scottish football club based in the village of Luncarty, near Perth, Perth and Kinross. Their home ground is Brownlands Park and the club competes in the East of Scotland League Second Division.

== History ==
They were formed in 1886 by employees of a local bleachworks and after some years in local Senior football, joined the Junior grade in 1921.

Up until the end of the 2005–06 season, they played in Tayside Division One in the Scottish Junior Football Association's East Region, and they finished second in the division's final season.

This would have seen them promoted into the Tayside Premier League but the SJFA restructured prior to the 2006–07 season, and the Bleachers found themselves in the twelve-team East Region, Central Division. They finished sixth in their first season in the division.

Luncarty played in its first major cup final for 25 years in May 2014, reaching the GA Engineering Cup Final, played at Tannadice Stadium. The Bleachers lost out on penalties to Lochee United after the match finished 1–1.

They spent a year in abeyance during the 2015–16 season but returned to competitive action in 2016–17 with a new management team of Jon Kelly and Richie Montgomery. 29 January 2020, Jonny Kelly stepped down as manager of the club after four years.

One of their local rivals was Bankfoot Athletic, but the club based a few miles to the north folded in 2014. Four years later, two other rivals from the city of Perth, Jeanfield Swifts and Kinnoull left the Junior setup to join the East of Scotland Football League within the senior pyramid, a move Luncarty themselves made in 2020.

The club won the Alex Jack Cup and Cup Winners Shield in the 2022–23 season, to qualify for the 2023–24 Scottish Cup – they won their opening three rounds against opponents from as far afield as Fortrose and Newton Stewart before being eliminated by Bo'ness United of the Lowland League.

== Notable players ==
- Jim Patterson

== Honours ==
- Perthshire Junior League winners: 1928–29, 1931–32, 1949–50, 1964–65
- East Region Tayside Division One runners-up: 2005–06
- Tayside League Division Two winners: 1972–73, 1989–90
- Constitutional Cup winners: 1940–41, 1964–66
- Currie Cup winners: 1957–58
- PA Cup winners: 1963–64, 1971–72
- Perthshire Junior Cup winners: 1940–41, 1952–53, 1963–64
- Perthshire Rose Bowl winners: 1962–63, 1968–69
- Supplementary League winners: 1968–69
- Davie Scott Good Conduct Trophy: 1983–84, 1991–92, 1993–94
- Luncarty Tournament winners: 2004
- Alex Jack Cup winners: 2022–23
- Cup Winners Shield winners: 2022–23
