= West Calder United F.C. =

Association football club in Scotland

West Calder United
- Full name: West Calder United Football Club
- Nickname: Cauther
- Founded: 1950
- Ground: Hermand Park Harburn Road; West Calder
- Capacity: 1,000
- Coordinates: 55°50′59″N 3°33′30″W
- Manager: Robert Main
- League: East of Scotland League First Division
- 2025–26: East of Scotland League Second Division, 1st of 15 (promoted)
Home colours	Away colours

West Calder United Football Club are a Scottish football club based in West Calder, West Lothian. Their home ground is Hermand Park, West Calder. Club colours are red and black. Currently they play in the East of Scotland League First Division.

The SJFA restructured prior to the 2006–07 season, and West Calder found themselves in the 15-team East Region, South Division. Their best finish in bottom tier of the East Region was 4th in 2017–18.

The club moved from the junior leagues to the East of Scotland League ahead of the 2021–22 season, securing their first league title by winning the Third Division in 2023–24 followed by the Second Division two years later in 2025–26.

== Club staff ==
=== Coaching staff ===
Role	Name
Manager	(Scotland) Robert Main
Assistant Manager	(Scotland) Scott Woodhouse
First Team Coach	(Scotland) Jordan McNeil
First Team Coach	(Scotland) John Gillogley
Goalkeeping Coach	(Scotland) Chris Coyne
Team First Aider	(Scotland) Richard Cordiner

== Managerial history ==
Name	Nationality	Years
Neil Morton	(Scotland)	?-1971
Alex Nicol	(Scotland)	1971-?
Jimmy Dunn	(Scotland)	1974-1977
Billy Ritchie	(Scotland)	1981-?
Jimmy Walker	(Scotland)	?-1986
Alex Clark	(Scotland)	1986-?
Jim Grant	(Scotland)	?-1989
Jimmy Walker	(Scotland)	1989-?
Richard Hastings	(Scotland)	2005-2012
Terry Aikman	(Scotland)	2012-?
Gareth Alexander	(Scotland)	2016-?
Greig Mitchell	(Scotland)	2016-?
Gary Sibbald	(Scotland)	2017-2018
Chris Gallacher	(Scotland)	2018-?
Crawford Bell	(Scotland)	2019-2020
Craig Chilton	(Scotland)	2020-?
Robert Main	(Scotland)	?-Present

^{c} Caretaker manager

== Honours ==
- East of Scotland League Second Division winners: 2025–26
- East of Scotland League Third Division winners: 2023–24
- Brown Cup: 1957–58
- Thorton Shield: 1957–58, 1958–59
- Murray Cup: 1957–58, 1958–59
