= Lochore Welfare F.C. =

Association football club in Fife, Scotland

Lochore Welfare
- Full name: Lochore Welfare Junior Football and Athletic Club
- Founded: 1934
- Ground: Central Park; Crosshill
- Capacity: 1,300
- Coordinates: 56°9′1″N 3°19′36″W
- Chairman: John Kirkland
- Manager: James Adam
- League: East of Scotland League First Division
- 2025–26: East of Scotland League First Division, 9th of 16
Home colours	Away colours

Lochore Welfare Junior Football and Athletic Club are a Scottish football club from the village of Crosshill, Fife. The club currently compete in the East of Scotland League First Division. Originally formed in 1934, the club are based at Central Park and their present home colours are black and white.

== History ==
Lochore Welfare are a club formed from mergers between various other Junior clubs over the years, firstly with local amateur side, Lochore Miners to become Lochore Miners Welfare. Then, in the late 1990s, it merged with Benarty JFC and reverted to its original name of Lochore Welfare. Crosshill was once a prosperous mining village but the decline of this industry has had a substantial impact on the community and hence the club, although the community is making strong efforts to fight against this.

This club has had some reputable players on their roster throughout its history. Among these are Willie Johnston, who could often be seen playing for Lochore before going on to play for Rangers and Scotland and Ian Porterfield, who gained popularity after scoring the winning goal for Sunderland in the 1973 FA Cup Final. Craig Levein was another player who went on to play for Scotland and Hearts and most recently, footballer Colin Cameron.

Other Lochore players who have stepped up include Tommy Callaghan with Celtic; Cammy Fraser, Willie Gibson, Arthur Mann, Peter Oliver and Willie Benvie at Hearts; Alec Edwards with Dunfermline and Hibernian; Ian Campbell with Cowdenbeath, Dunfermline and Brechin; Jimmy Logie with Arsenal; Chris Anderson at Blackburn Rovers; Garry Patterson with Dundee.

Former player and captain James Adam took over as manager in October 2018. He is assisted by another two former players; Gary Patterson and James Davies, as well as goalkeeper coach Scott Donaldson.

Lochore moved from the Junior leagues to the East of Scotland League ahead of the 2020–21 season. They won their first trophy in 20 years by securing the King Cup in 2022–23.

== Ground ==
Central Park has a capacity of 1,300. There is a small covered enclosure and a refreshment kiosk. The pitch itself was relaid at considerable cost to the club in 1998. Home attendances can reach around 200 for more significant games.

== Honours ==
Senior

- King Cup: 2022–23

Junior

- Fife Junior League winners (7): 1938–39, 1947–48, 1953–54, 1955–56, 1961–62, 1962–63, 1963–64
- Fife Junior (PSM) Cup (5): 1937–38, 1950–51, 1960–61, 1963–64, 1979–80
- Cowdenbeath (Interbrew) Cup: 1952–53, 1955–56, 1961–62, 1963–64, 1967–68, 1974–75
- Kingdom Kegs Cup: 2002–03
- Express Cup: 1960–61, 1963–64
- Mitchell Cup: 1937–38, 1955–56, 1961–62, 1962–63
- West Fife Cup: 1937–38, 1938–39, 1948–49, 1953–54, 1954–55, 1962–63

== Sources ==
- Non-League Scotland
- Scottish Football Historical Archive
- Player Database
