= Creamery Park =

Football ground in Bathgate, Scotland

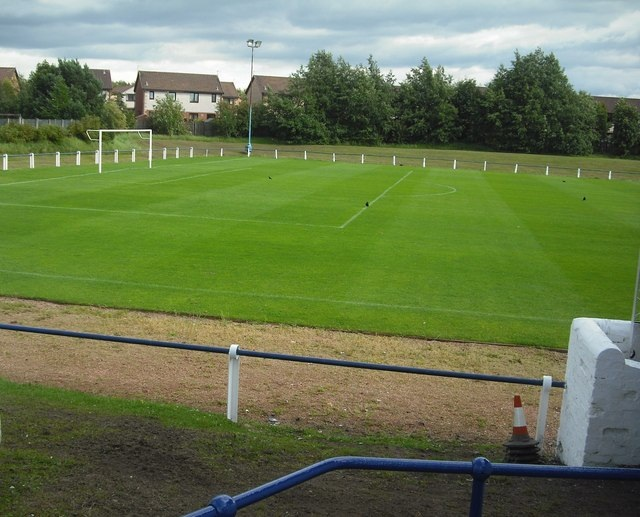

- Location within West Lothian
- Location: Bathgate, West Lothian, Scotland
- Coordinates: 55°53′57.12″N 3°39′23.76″W
- Surface: Grass

Tenant
- Bathgate Thistle

Creamery Park is a football ground located in Bathgate, West Lothian, Scotland. It serves as the home ground of East Region Super League outfit Bathgate Thistle. Previously it had been home to the Rangers Reserve team, until a rule change forced them to move elsewhere. More recently, it was also home to the Motherwell Under-19 team.

Also at Creamery Park are a clubhouse, and a floodlit five-a-side pitch behind one goal, as well as high-quality changing facilities.

The ground has a capacity of around 3,000 spectators.
