= Armadale Thistle F.C. =

Association football club in Scotland

Armadale Thistle
- Full name: Armadale Thistle Football Club
- Nickname: The Dale
- Founded: 1936
- Ground: Volunteer Park, Armadale
- Capacity: 3,000
- Coordinates: 55°54′1″N 3°42′1″W
- Manager: Colin Strickland
- League: East of Scotland League Premier Division
- 2025–26: East of Scotland League First Division, 1st of 16 (promoted)
Home colours	Away colours

Armadale Thistle Football Club are a football club from the town of Armadale, West Lothian in Scotland. Formed in 1936 and nicknamed The Dale, they are members of the Scottish Junior Football Association and presently play in the East of Scotland League Premier Division.

The club arose from the remnants of the town's former Scottish Football League club, Armadale, who had been based at Volunteer Park, and took over the ground from them.

== Club staff ==
=== Board of directors ===
Role	Name
President	(Scotland) Bill Baird
Club secretary	(Scotland) Scott Watson

=== Coaching staff ===
Role	Name
Manager	(Scotland) Colin Strickland
Assistant manager	(Scotland) Colin Leiper
First team coach	(Scotland) Craig Young
Goalkeeper Coach	(Scotland) Steph McCafferty
Coach	(Scotland) Gavin Wallace
Physio	(Scotland) Peter Smith

== Managerial history ==
Name	Nationality	Years
Lachie McMillan	(Scotland)	1941-?
Charlie Briggs	(Scotland)	?-1954
Tim Irvine	(Scotland)	1975-?
John Jameson	(Scotland)	1977-?
Bill Henderson	(Scotland)	1981-?
John Lambie	(Scotland)	?-?
James McCafferty	(Scotland)	?-1986
Alex 'Kitty' Dunnigan	(Scotland)	1986
Joe Craig	(Scotland)	1987-?
Bobby Ford	(Scotland)	1988-1992
John Mitchell	(Scotland)	1992-?
John Brogan	(Scotland)	1996-1997
Bobby Ford	(Scotland)	1998-?
Eric Sinclair	(Scotland)	2003-?
Jim Henderson	(Scotland)	2008-2016
Derek Strickland	(Scotland)	2016-2023
Colin Strickland	(Scotland)	2023-

^{c} Caretaker manager

== Honours ==
- East of Scotland League First Division winners: 2025–26
- East of Scotland League Second Division winners: 2024–25
- Edinburgh & District League champions:1939–40, 1940–41, 1949–50, 1952–53
- East Region South Division champions: 2008–09
- East Region Division Two champions: 1984–85, 1988–89
- Lanarkshire Hozier Cup winners: 1942–43
- East of Scotland Junior Cup winners: 1943–44, 1948–49, 1952–53, 1961–62
- St. Michael's Cup winners: 1999–00
- Brown Cup winners: 1942–43, 1943–44, 1946–47, 1950–51, 1953–54
