= Kennoway Star Hearts F.C. =

Association football club in Scotland

Kennoway Star Hearts
- Full name: Kennoway Star Hearts
- Founded: 2013
- Ground: Treaton Park, Star
- Capacity: 1,000
- Coordinates: 56°12′47″N 3°6′28″W
- Chairman: Brian Davidson
- Manager: Ally Griffin
- League: East of Scotland League First Division
- 2025–26: East of Scotland League Second Division, 5th of 15 (promoted)
Home colours	Away colours

Kennoway Star Hearts Football Club are a football club from the village of Star near Kennoway in Fife, Scotland. Currently competing in the East of Scotland League First Division, the club play their home games at Treaton Park.

== History ==
=== Star Hearts ===
Star Hearts were formed in 1962 and joined the Kirkcaldy and District League in 1963 and won its Second Division at the first time of asking. In 1973 they reached the final of the Scottish Amateur Cup at Hampden Park but were defeated 1–0 by Knockentiber. However, two years later in 1975 they reached the final at Hampden again, and this time were successful in winning the cup by defeating Morriston YMCA by a 2–1 scoreline. In doing so they became the first amateur side from Fife to win the Scottish Amateur Cup. The club won the Fife Amateur Cup a record ten times, and between 1968 and 1976 they reached nine consecutive finals, winning seven of them.

In 1984 the club were founder members of the Kingdom Caledonian Amateur Football Association.

In 2008 their co-founder and former manager David Leitch was presented with the top award (Merit award for services to football) at the Grassroots awards at Hampden Park Glasgow.

=== Kennoway Star Hearts ===
In 2013 Star Hearts merged with nearby amateur side Kennoway AFC, forming Kennoway Star Hearts JFC. The new club successfully applied for membership of the Scottish Junior Football Association in 2013, and joined the East Region North Division ahead of the 2013–14 season.

In their first season KSH finished a creditable 5th after occupying 2nd spot for many months. The club gained promotion to the East Premier League by finishing 3rd in 2014–15, and then achieved promotion to the East Super League as runners-up in 2016–17. They remained in the Superleague until their move to the East of Scotland League in May 2020.
