= Newtown Park, Bo'ness =

Football ground in Bo'ness, Scotland

Newtown Park
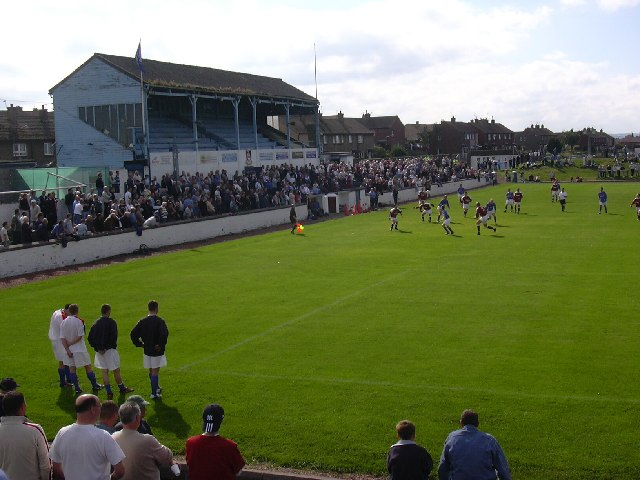

- Location within Falkirk
- Location: Bo'ness, Scotland
- Coordinates: 56.0095°N 3.6116°W
- Capacity: 2,500
- Surface: Artificial turf
- Record attendance: 9,000
- Field size: 100 x 60m

Construction
- Opened: 1886

Tenants
- Bo'ness F.C. (1886–1945; Bo'ness Athletic (2019–2026); Bo'ness United (1945–)

Newtown Park is a football ground in Bo'ness, Scotland. It is currently the home ground of Lowland League side Bo'ness United, and was previously the home ground of Bo'ness and Bo'ness Athletic

== History ==
Bo'ness F.C. moved to Newtown Park in 1886. A stand was erected on the southern side of the pitch and a second built in 1902. However, both had been removed by World War I. In 1921 the club were elected to Division Two of the Scottish Football League; the first SFL match at Newtown Park was played on 27 August 1921, a 3–1 win against Broxburn United in front of 4,000 spectators. A few weeks later the club recorded their highest league attendance at Newtown Park, as 5,000 watched a 1–0 win over Armadale. Newtown Park was later upgraded with the creation of embankments on all four sides of the pitch and the erection of a 500-seat stand.

The record attendance at Newtown Park of 9,000 was set on 5 March 1927 for a Scottish Cup fourth round match against Celtic, with the visitors winning 5–2. Bo'ness finished top of Division Two at the end of the season and were promoted to Division One. The record league attendance of 5,000 was equalled on 26 November 1927 for a 1–0 defeat by Celtic. In 1945 Bo'ness merged with Bo'ness Cadora to form Bo'ness United, with the new club taking over Newtown Park. The seated stand was dismantled in 2012.

An artificial surface and floodlights were installed in 2019.
