= Ard (name) =

Surname of Scottish origin

Aird is a Scottish surname. Ard is an anglicized variant of the surname. Aird originates from a place name, either The Aird, an area of the County of Inverness, or Aird Farm near Hurlford, Ayrshire. Both of the place names derive from the Scottish Gaelic word àird(e) meaning "height, promontory", or "headland".

== People with the surname ==
Aird

- Alastair Aird, British royal courtier
- Catherine Aird, pseudonym of English novelist Kinn Hamilton McIntosh
- Fraser Aird, Canadian soccer player
- Holly Aird, British actress
- Jock Aird, Scotland and New Zealand footballer
- John Aird (disambiguation)
- Kenny Aird, Scottish footballer
- Lashrecse Aird (born 1986), American politician
- Michael Aird, Australian politician
- Peter Aird, Scottish footballer
- Robert B. Aird, American neurologist
- Ronnie Aird, English cricketer and cricket administrator
- Thomas Aird, Scottish poet

Ard

- Billy Ard, American football player
- Jim Ard, American basketball player
- Kayla Ard, American basketball coach
- Ken Ard (dancer), American dancer, choreographer, actor and singer
- Ken Ard (politician), American politician
- Sam Ard, American stock car racing driver

== Given name ==
- Ard (biblical figure), a son of Benjamin in the Bible
- Ard., abbreviation in scientific literature for botanist Pietro Arduino
- Ard Ayush, leader of a rebellion in Mongolia
- Ard Louis, Dutch physicist and professor
- Ard Schenk, Dutch speed skater
- Ard Sluis, Dutch football manager
- Ard van der Steur, Dutch politician and lawyer
- Ard van Peppen, Dutch footballer

== See also ==
- Aird (disambiguation)
- Airds
