= University of St Andrews Boat Club =

Scottish university rowing team

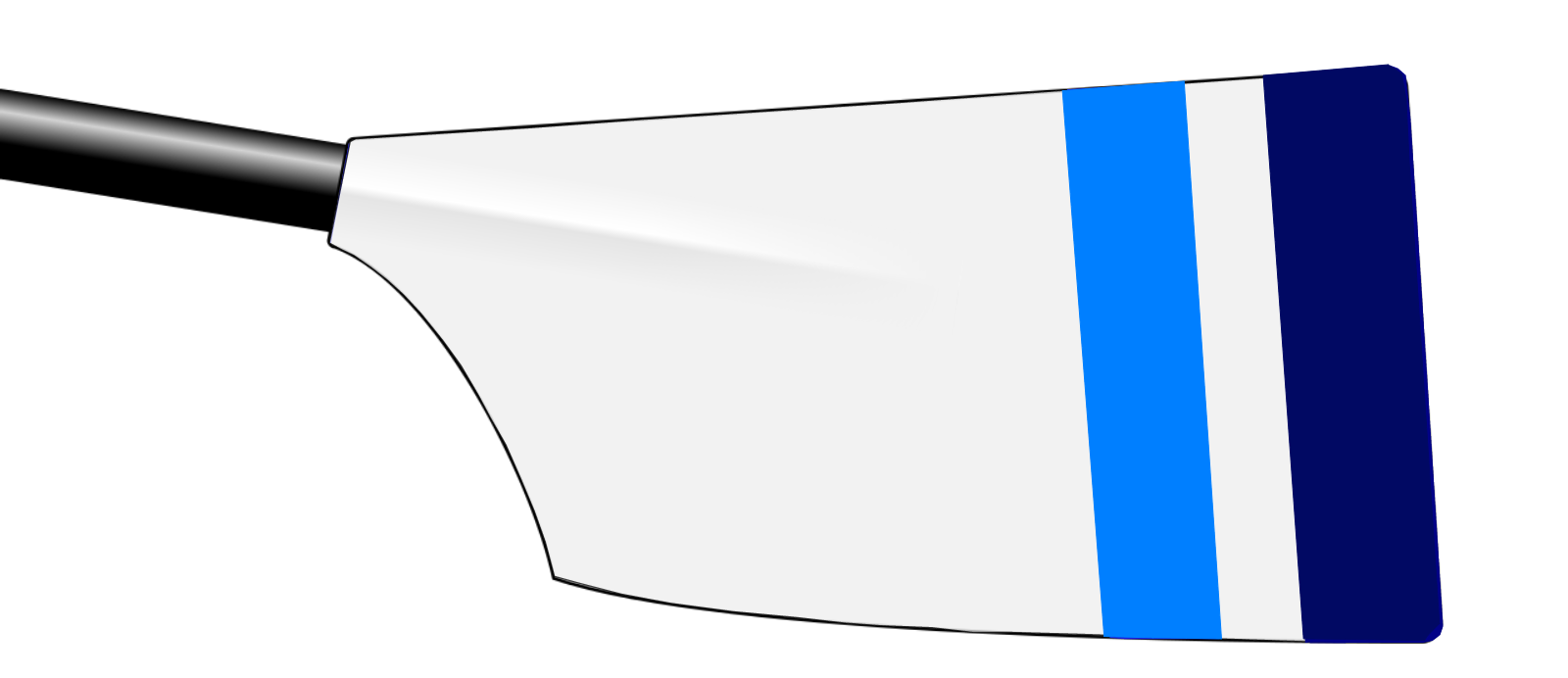
- Location: Fife
- Home water: Loch Ore, Fife
- Founded: 1962
- Key people: Lewis McCue (director of rowing)
- Membership: 80
- University: University of St Andrews
- Affiliations: Scottish Rowing; University of St Andrews Athletic Union
- Website: rowing.wp.st-andrews.ac.uk

Events
- Saints Regatta

The University of St Andrews Boat Club (UStABC), founded in 1962, is the rowing team affiliated to the University of St Andrews. Operating under the University of St Andrews Athletic Union, the club competes in head races and regattas across Scotland and England, including the Head of the River Race (London), British Universities and Colleges Sport (BUCS) Regatta and Henley Royal Regatta. Its national governing body is Scottish Rowing and the registration code of 'SAU'.

== History ==
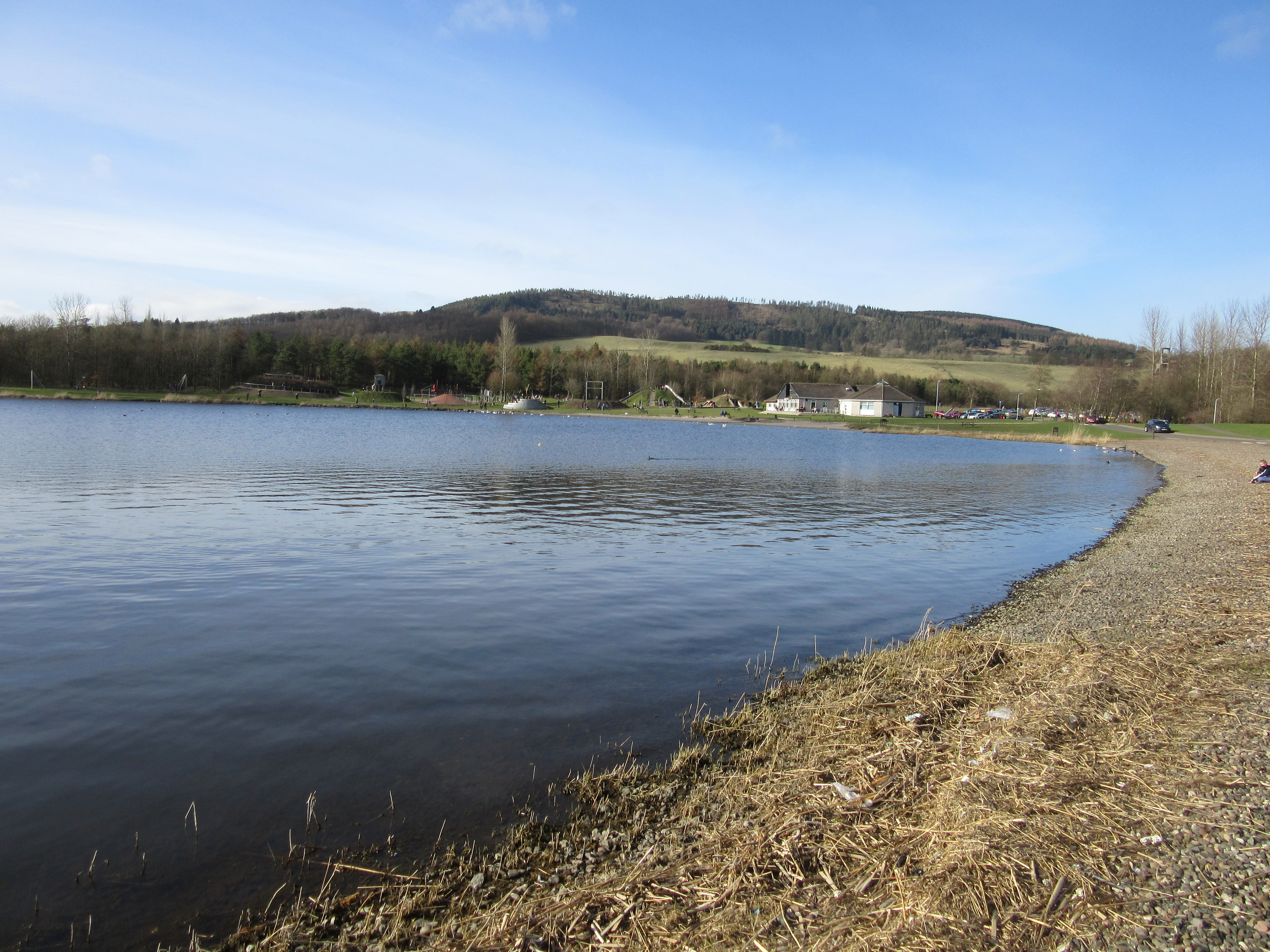
Loch Ore, Lochore Meadows Country Park

The club was founded in the 1962–1963 academic year by John Browne with one coxed four and 6 athletes. The club rowed on the River Eden until the late 1990s until they moved to River Tay, Perth due to extremely tidal waters. In January 2016, the club moved again to Loch Ore, Fife.

A Senior Men's coxed four (4+) won the Scottish Rowing Championships 2012 and in the 2015–2016 season, many Club records were set with the Men's 1st VIII and Women's 1st VIII breaking the previous Club records for the Head of the River Race (HORR) and Women's Head of the River Race (WeHORR). Additionally, the Club qualified for the Prince Albert Challenge Cup at Henley Royal Regatta and the Cathy Cruickshank Trophy for Academic Coxed Fours at Henley Women's Regatta in 2016, and continue to race at these events annually, with growing athlete numbers. The club has gone onto win a shield at the British Senior Rowing Championships, and the VL trophy at Scottish Indoor Rowing Championships in 2018.

The 2019 season was one of excellence for the Boat Club. The Senior Women reaffirmed their position as W4- medalists at BUCS and achieved the first gold medal for the club in the Wint2-, which featured Lydia Theos and Kirstin Giddy. The Senior Men equally cemented themselves within the rowing community; from breaking club records at Head of the River Race (HORR), to winning the second gold BUCS medal, amongst others. Their most notable achievement of the season was reaching semi-finals of the Prince Albert Challenge Cup at Henley Royal Regatta. Many of the club members went on to represent Team Scotland at Home International Regatta.

The club announced the appointment of Olympian Alan Sinclair (rower) as Director of Rowing during the 2020–21 season. Alan Sinclair left his position after the 2023-2024 season, and Lewis McCue became Director of Rowing at the beginning of the 2024-2025 season.

== Facilities & Training ==
The University of St Andrews Boat Club utilises indoor studio space for land training as well as usage of specialist Strength and Conditioning facilities within the University Sports complex.

Following a move in 2016, from their previous training waters on the River Tay, Perth, the club now trains on Loch Ore in Lochore Meadows Country Park, Fife. The 1.4 km long Loch provides training conditions and facilities.

== The Community ==
Taking pride in their community, the Boat Club organises a 24-hour ergathon every September. All members of the club take it in turns to row for a consecutive 24-hour period in order to raise money for Maggie's Centres.

The Development Officers over the years have been developing a school's programme, to widen the sport to the larger community. Madras College worked with the Boat Club throughout the 2018–19 season, to encourage sport amongst their students. As of 2019, the Boat Club began a brand new schools program at Lochgelly High School. Rowers of St Andrews are volunteering their time to help move the High School up to first place in the Scottish Indoors Rowing League.
