= Benarty =

Group of towns and villages in Scotland

Coordinates: 56°09′37″N 3°19′27″W

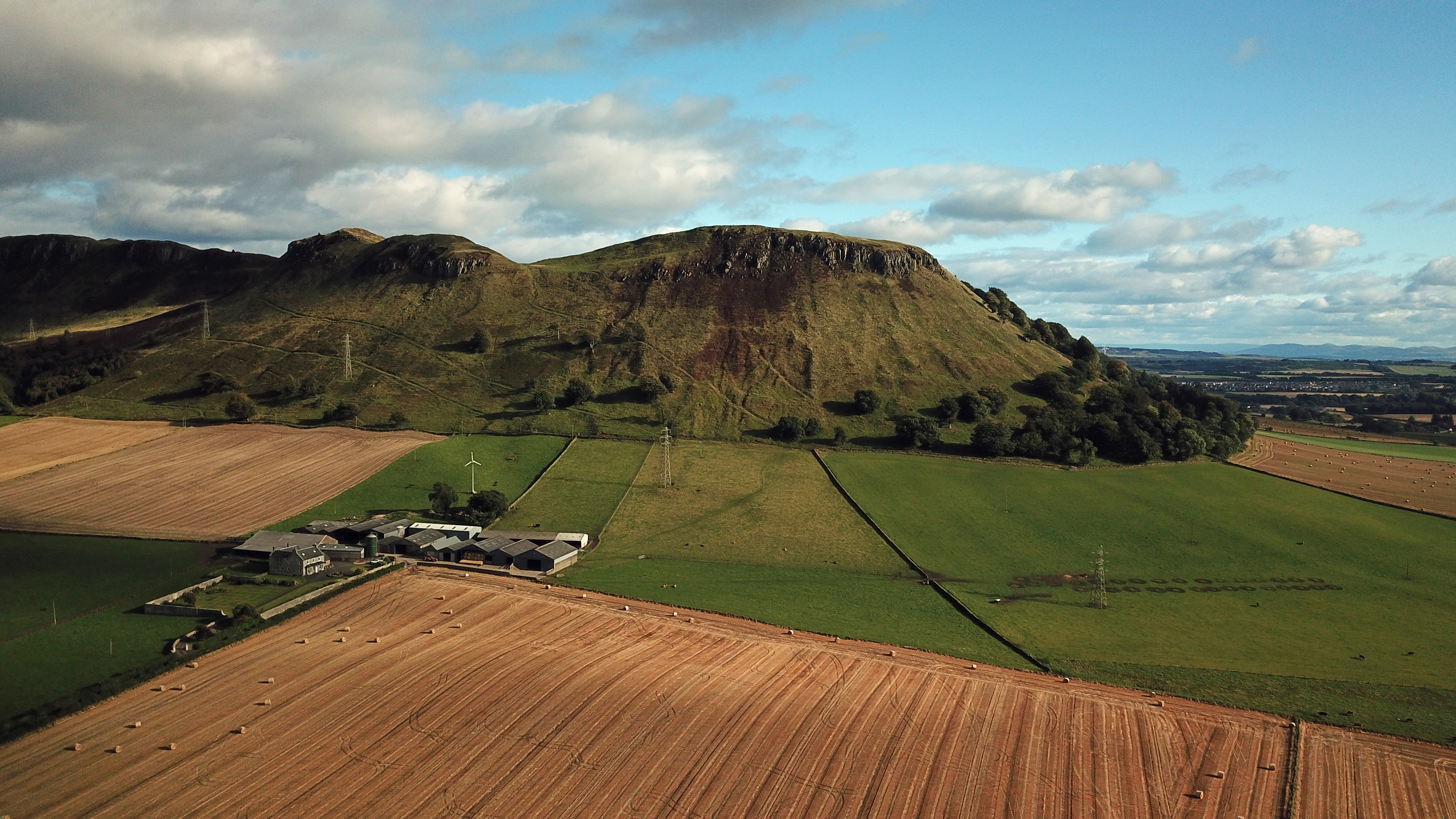
Benarty Hill

Benarty (Scottish Gaelic: Beinn Artaidh) is the name informally used to refer to the ex-mining towns of Ballingry and Lochore and the villages of Crosshill, Lochcraig and Glencraig. The area is situated north of Lochgelly, Fife. The name comes from Benarty Hill, locally simply Benarty, a prominent local landmark, at 356m high.

== See also ==
- List of places in Fife
