= John Aird =

John Aird may refer to:

- John Aird (Lord Provost) (1655–1730), Scottish merchant, Lord Provost of Glasgow
- Sir John Aird, 1st Baronet (1833–1911), English engineering contractor associated with Aswan Dam, MP for North Paddington
- Sir John Aird (banker) (1855–1938), Canadian banker
- Sir John Aird, 2nd Baronet (1861–1934), of the Aird baronets
- Sir John Renton Aird, 3rd Baronet (1898–1973), of the Aird baronets
- John Black Aird (1923–1995), Canadian lawyer and politician
- Jock Aird (John Aird, 1926–2021), Scottish footballer
- Sir John Aird, 4th Baronet (1940–2023), British baronet
- John B. Aird (ship), a self-discharging lake freighter/bulk carrier
