= University of St Andrews Union Debating Society =

The University of St Andrews Union Debating Society
- Former logo of the Union Debating Society
- Predecessor: Literary Society (merged 1890); Classical Society (merged 1890); Parliamentary and Dialectic Society (disbanded 1932); Women's Debating Society (merged 1963)
- Formation: 1794
- Type: Student debating society
- Headquarters: St Andrews, Scotland
- Location(s): Students’ Association; St Mary’s Place; St Andrews; KY16 9UZ
- President: Flynn Whittaker
- First Secretary to the House & Chief Whip: Abbie Lewis
- Chair of Ways and Means: Birte Burkart
- Treasurer: Laurence Dunkley
- Parent organization: University of St Andrews
- Affiliations: World Universities Debating Council; European Universities Debating Council; University of St Andrews Students' Association; Scottish Students' Debating Council
- Website: uniondebatingsociety.org

The University of St Andrews Union Debating Society is a student debating society at the University of St Andrews in Scotland. Tracing its origins back to 1794 and established under the current name in 1890, it is the oldest continuously operating debate society of its kind in the English-speaking world (although it is predated by the College Historical Society at Trinity College Dublin which ceased operations for a period beginning in 1794, the Diagnostic Society of Edinburgh who merged with the Dialetic Society and take their founding date from 1787, and the Speculative Society of Edinburgh which was founded in 1764) and the oldest as a whole in the United Kingdom.

It also holds weekly public debates in the Lower Parliament Hall, which are free and open to all students - the only Scottish Debating Society to do this.

In 2015, the society became the first in Scotland to win the European Universities Debating Championship, a competition that they compete at every year.

The society's motto remains "pro amicitia et litteris" meaning "for friendship and learning".

== History ==
=== Founding ===
The origins of the University of St Andrews Debating Society can be traced to the formation in 1794 of the university Literary Society. Despite being initially popular, the society began to suffer from a lack of funding beginning in the 19th century. To remedy this, Article 3 of the Literary Society's 1832 constitution imposed a one shilling fee per semester and fines varying in severity for lateness, absence, or the use of 'improper language'. At this stage of its history, the Literary Society operated under a strange mixture of egalitarianism and exclusiveness. Initially, there was no president of the society and meetings were chaired by each member in rotation, taking place in St Salvator's Quadrangle. During this period, the only leadership positions were that of Secretary and Treasurer and all decisions were taken collectively by the society as a whole. However, membership was limited to twenty-five students all of whom were required until 1844 to attend or have attended the university's classes in Logic or Moral Philosophy. Membership was by election only, and no 'strangers' were permitted to attend debates. In 1846, The Classical Society, a rival debating society, was established and was soon vying with the Literary Society for the attention of the student body. In 1847, this new society began a new tradition of hosting an end of term feast called the Gaudeamas, which was later hosted jointly with the Literary Society beginning in 1866. However, it soon became apparent that there were simply not enough students at the university to justify the existence of two debating societies and consequently in 1890 the Classical Society and Literary Society merged to form the Union Debating Society.

=== Development ===
In 1892, the acquisition of James Crichton's House by the fledgling Students' Union, which despite not being officially affiliated with the society, allowed it to host debates in the Union Diner. This, and the fact that the Union Debating Society now had over seventy members (a third of the total student population), gave the society renewed confidence and a greater importance than ever before in the lives of students.

In 1898 the society decided to form Debates Board, in order to manage the running of the society, it consisted of an honorary president, two honorary vice-presidents, a secretary, a treasurer, a "general committee" of four members, a 'College Echoes' Reporting Committee, and a Debates Committee of four members. In 1910 the constitution was amended to include the election of an official president of the society was created; however, as World War I began society membership dropped, and no president was elected between 1914 and 1919. Following the war, the Union Debating Society remained in decline, so to combat this the society's vice-president (Mr. D. Dick) proposed that its membership become a part of the subscription to the Students' Union, although these negotiations ultimately broke down. These discussions were reopened on 21 March 1925 by then President D. Kennedy who proposed in his farewell address that the Union Debating Society become a committee of the Students' Union. This move was supported by treasurer J. B. Torrance, and the decision was ratified on 30 October 1925, following which the Union Debating Society was affiliated with the Students' Union, and all male matriculated students of the university would be members. The chair of the Union Debating Society would be elected as the Union Convenor of Debates, and debating would be done completely under the auspices of the Students' Union. The Debates Board ceased to exist, and the title of 'President of the Union Debating Society' was kept purely as a courtesy title.

Despite this change, attendance at debates continued to drop, especially as more women attended the university and were disallowed from participating in the society. In response, a new mixed-sex competitor for the Union Debating Society emerged, called the Parliamentary and Dialectic Society, taking over most of its primary functions. The Parliamentary and Dialectic Society prided itself on allowing female members to speak at debates, and restricting the input of male speakers on sensitive issues, which led to it losing the backing of the Students' Union in 1932. When asked by female members of the P and D if the Union Debating Society would now allow women to become members, then president Stephen W. Bonarjee told them to 'go away and start your own society,' leading to the creation of the Women's Debating Society in 1932.

In 1932 the society elected to re-create the Debates Board, in order to regain some independence from the Students' Union. It was to consist of the Convenor of Debates and two clerks to the house. Following this move, the board began to host Parliamentary and Inter-Varsity Debating Competitions, the first of which drew participants from Dublin, Aberdeen, Aberystwyth, Durham, and Liverpool.

In 1963, the Students' Union, which had up until that point been exclusively for male students voted to merge with the Women's Student Union and when this occurred the Union Debating Society merged its membership with Women's Debating Society.

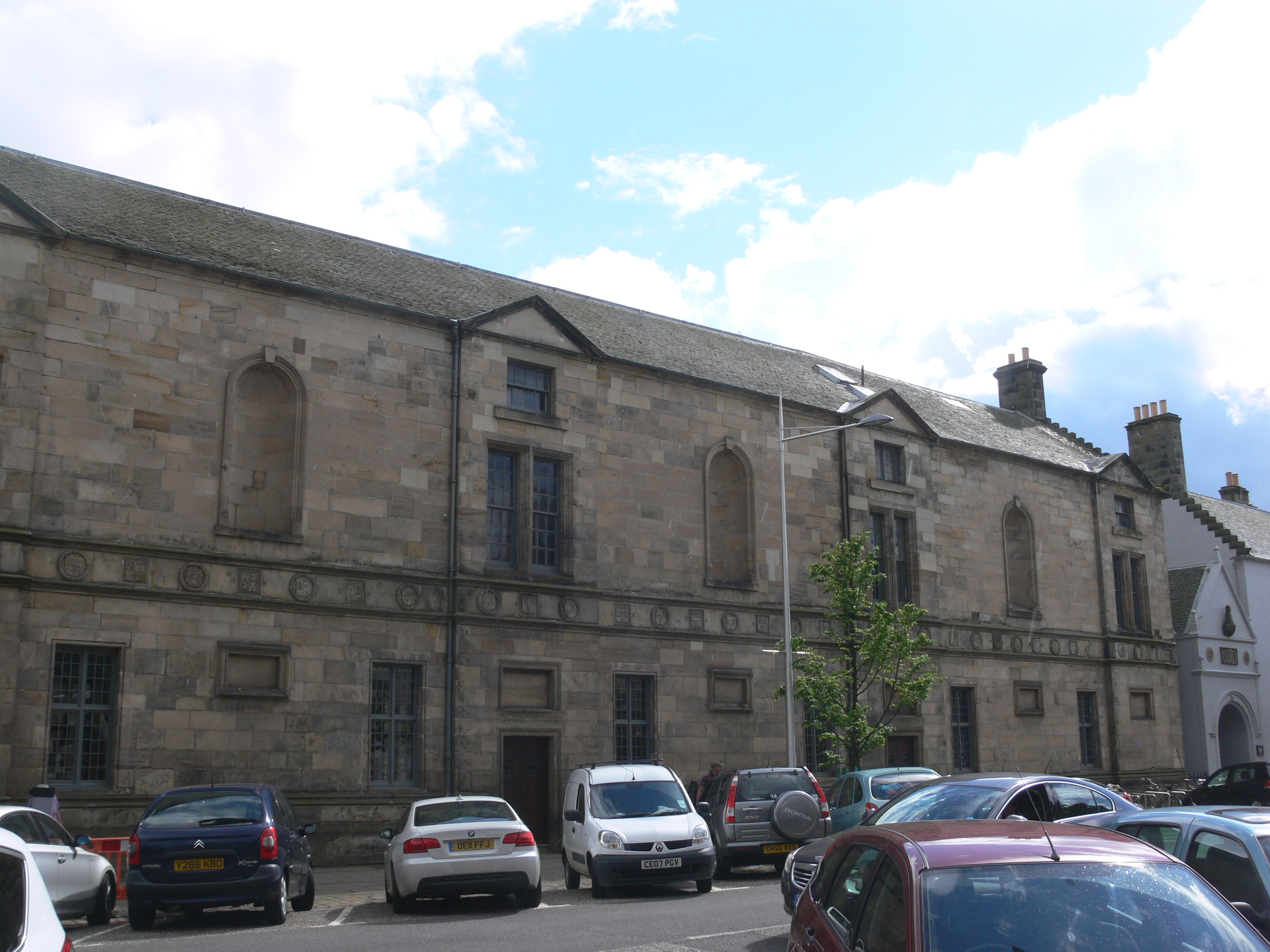
The Union Debating Society hold weekly debates in Lower Parliament Hall

In the 1970s, the move of the Students' Union from its original home to a new purpose built building provided the Union Debating Society with the opportunity to make a move of its own. The Convenor of Debates took the opportunity to move debates to the Union Theater, and then to Lower Parliament Hall in St Mary's Quadrangle.

This physical move away from the Students' Union was accompanied by an organisational one. In 1979, the society decided to change the Debating Sub-Committee into the 'Debating Board of Ten'. This new sub-committee comprised the convenor, chairman of ways and means, sergeant-at-arms, clerk to the house, treasurer, steward, two ordinary members, union president, and a further representative from the Union Committee. The president would continue to be elected as the convenor of debates, but the Board of Ten would be elected in an annual general meeting of the Union Debating Society.

=== The Society today ===
Today the Union Debating Society continues to fulfill its primary mission of holding regular debates in Lower Parliament Hall. The society continues to attract famous speakers. These weekly debates are available for all to attend. The classic St Andrews Gown is traditionally worn by attendees, with the president of the society wearing the Debates President gown. These public debates are organised by the president and their Public Debates Sub-Committee.

The Union Debating Society also has a competitive team, which debates at international university competitions. Major successes include reaching the final of the European Universities Debating Championships in 2007 as well as the semi-finals of the World Universities Debating Championships in 2007, 2008, 2012 and 2013. In 2023 the Union Debating Society reached the WUDC octofinals, as the 25th-best ranking team. The society won the Vienna 2015 European Championships where two speakers were also the best and 2nd-best ranking speakers - the first for a Scottish institution.

Domestically, the society has performed at the Scottish Mace Championship finals in 2022, 2023, 2024, and 2025, as well as at competitions such as the Oxford Intervarsity (hosted by the Oxford Union).

== Notable Controversies and Debates ==
- In 1842 the society, despite being under an Anglican government, voted in favor of Catholic Emancipation and the reintroduction of income tax.
- Beginning in 1874, the society began to run a series of debates using the motion this house has no faith in His/Her Majesty's government. The most recent debate of this kind ran on 10 September 2026.
- In November 1933, Liberal Party leader Archibald Sinclair spoke in a debate on the rise of Socialism.
- That same year, Otto Wagener, a Nazi, debated in support of the recent election of the Nationalist Socialist German Workers' Party.
- In 1950, under the presidency of Stewart T. Bates (1950–1951), the society debated the motion this house believes the Communist Party has the only real solution for the Capitalist Crisis. The motion fell with only twelve votes in favor and three abstentions.
- In 1952 newly elected Union Debating Society President Derek Meteyard (1952–1953) was arrested for unlawful possession of a golf trolley.
- Meteyard also hosted a debate on 5 November 1951 debated by LJ Woodward and Professor H. J. Rose on the motion: this house believes it's the same the whole world over, it's the poor as 'as the blame, the rich as 'as the pleasure, and it's all a bleeding shame. The house voted the motion down.
- Presidents Stewart Lamont (1966–1968) and Gillies Clark (1968–1969) hosted a series of anti-religious and anti-Catholic debates including: this house has no need of a god and this house abominates the Pope and his Church.
- Towards the end of Lamont's term, he proposed the motion this house prefers the Pill to the Pope. During his speech Lamont produced a pill and demanded opposition produce the Pope. They could not and he won the debate.
- Lamont also hosted politically controversial debates, such as in 1966 the motion this house believes that Guy Fawkes was the only man who went to Parliament with the intention of carrying out his original proposal.
- In 1967 also under Lamont, the Union Debating Society hosted the debate this house would not let his daughter marry a black man. This was immediately met with criticism by the student paper of the time the Aien which accused the society of illiberalism, as well as having sexist and racist policies. The Aien also went onto publish a response by a group of Arab students who had attended the debate in which they declared they had not come to Scotland to marry white women.
- In 1969 under the presidency of Allan Ronaldson (1969–1970), the motion this house regrets having come to St Andrews was debated, but failed to pass with only five votes in favor and one abstention.
- In 1970 a debate later known as 'the Balloon Debate' occurred. During this session, speakers had to assume the role of a character and argue why they should not be thrown out of a hot air balloon to stop it from sinking. One notable participant Michael Forsyth chose to play the role of Margaret Thatcher.
- Both before and after the merge with the Women's Debate Society in 1963, the Union Debate Society hosted a series of controversial debates about the place and role of women. These motions included:
  - In 1932: the house debated the motion this house deplores the prevalence of the sex motif in literature, following the ban of the book Lady Chatterley's Lover and allowed women to speak.
  - In 1946: the society voted overwhelmingly in favor of the motion the house believes that a woman's place is in the home.
  - In 1954, the house voted in favor of the motion this house regrets the modern woman.
  - In 1974: this house believes that a woman's place is in the bed and this house believes that women should be barred from places of authority.
  - In 1980: this house believes that a woman's place is in a harem.
- The most notable of these debates took place in 1979 under the presidency of Chris Graffius (1979–1980) with the motion this house believes that rape is a female fantasy.
  - The motion was debated by Christopher Roffey, a Tory Club member, for the proposition and Nancy Ritchie, a Scottish Women's Action Group member, for the opposition.
  - The debate remained relatively calm until one woman, Sarah Norman, another Tory Club member, voiced her support for the proposition side, following which a group of roughly 20 Scottish Women's Action Group members, including Nancy Ritchie, began to verbally harass Roffey who screamed in response 'get out you stupid women.'
  - Following that a hoax emergency call was placed and three fire engines, one ambulance, and six police officers stormed Lower Parliament Hall, with the SWAG women being blamed by Roffey in the student paper Aien for the disruption.
- Graffius's successor, Celia Boddington (1980–1982) also hosted a series of failed controversial debates including:
  - This house believes civilization ends north of Gretna Green.
  - This house believes it is desirable that homosexuality should be cured.
  - This house demands that the Kate Kennedy Club admit women.
- In one of Boddington's debates the pastor Jack Glass debated the motion this house would ban the papal visit and claimed that the pope should excommunicate Irish Republican Army terrorists, that the Catholic church was responsible for the deaths of 5 million civilians, that the Virgin Mary was impure, and that Roman Catholicism is modern paganism.
- In another incident broadcast live by the BBC, the Union Debating Society under Boddington debated the motion this house believes that contraception is immoral in a Christian society, proposed by Joseph Devine, the Archbishop of Glasgow, and opposed by Michael Hare Duke, the bishop of Perth and St Andrews, getting into a fist fight over whether contraceptives prevent abortion.
- In 1982, Boddington invited Andrew Brons, leader of the National Front Party in South Africa, to speak on a motion condemning the 1976 Race Relations Act, despite calls from outside the union to disinvite him.
  - The motion was opposed by Tory Club President Giles Bootheway who compared Brons's attack on race relations to Jack the Ripper claiming that laws against murder violated his personal liberty.
  - Following this incident, the Union Debating Society was banned from Inter-Varsity debates by York University and Manchester University which stated that the ban stemmed not from the one debate but from a historical pattern of poor behavior by the society.
- In 1983, president Ben Stocks (1983–1984) organized the World Record Debate which was observed by Guinness Book of World Records officials.
  - The debate was on the motion this house prefers the past to the present and the present to the future.
  - Debaters spoke in 14 hours shifts with subs filling for rest and eating breaks and was in total 100 hours and holds the record for the World's Longest Continuous Debate.
  - The debate raised £5000 for the society's increasing competitive debate sector, funding Sarah Norman and Ben Stock's trip to the 1983 World Universities Debating Championship at Princeton University at which they placed 3rd.
- In 1984, during the same voting session the house voted in favor of Gay Liberation and the upholding of Victorian morals.
- In 1985 during the presidency of Derek Browning (1985), the Union Debating Society hosted the debate this house believes feminism is a crutch for female inadequacy, with proposition speakers Eileen May and Claire Jenkins stating that women in the audience who thought they needed feminism wouldn't burn their bras if they really needed support.
- In 1987, during a debate on the motion this house would not expect every man to do his duty, fourteen gowned members of the Kate Kennedy Club entered the debate chamber with lit torches prompting the fire department to be called. It was discovered that there was a flaw in the wiring of the alarm system and Lower Parliament Hall was never actually in danger of being burned down.
- The presidency of Andrew Burnett (1987) was marked by a series of scandals for the Union Debating Society:
  - Burnett won the society a sponsorship by the Norwich Group company which he then used with some of the money the society received annually from the Student's Union to charter a taxi to ferry him around St Andrews at all times of the day.
  - The new student newspaper 'The Chronicle' began publishing exposé reports of Burnett's lavish spending, even calling for the society to be disbanded after one night out cost the university £726.
  - Burnett was so unpopular a coalition of anti-debaters stole the £1000 worth of historical silverware that was on loan to the society from a local hotel forcing Burnett to repay the hotel or risk prosecution.
  - Burnett paid for dinners for anyone coming to the society's debates that included two free bottles of wine and one free bottle of Port for each attendee.
  - Burnett hosted a debate calling for the reunification of the University of St Andrews and the University of Dundee, with the rector of each university on one side the debate.
  - Another debate hosted by Burnett was on the motion this house believes that Catholicism promotes the spread of AIDs.
  - Burnett set a motion during the internal Maidens competition on voluntary euthanasia and was reported on by the student newspaper the 'Chronicle' as being an explicit attack on 'homosexuals and AIDs victims.'
  - Burnett also organized the Union Debating Society's Ascot Ball, which had its own series of controversies including:
    - Burnett hired the pop group Mel and Kim to write the song Fun, Love, and Money as the ball's theme song.
    - Burnett organized the gambling on horse races on the Old Course Country Club's lawn.
    - Burnett gave away free several free bottles of Dom Perignon champagne to every guest.
    - Burnett hired a bucking bronco to give rides to guests.
  - Due to the several thousand pounds the ball cost the Union, as well as Burnett's other extravagant expenditures the Students' Union cut the funding of the society by 75% and has never restored it to pre-Burnett rates.
- In 1990 during the end of year President's Farewell Solatium, which had replaced the Gaudeamas Feast, president Graham Stewart (1990–1991) ended the night tied to a drainpipe in the quadrangle wearing nothing but a monocle.

== Organisation ==
The Union Debating Society consists of the Board of Ten and then the Competitive Debates Subcommittee and the Public Debates Subcommittee. Together these compose the entire Debates Board and are composed solely of St Andrews students. All positions (save the media, treasurer and equity officers) are elected in the AGM held in spring. All matriculated students are able to run for any of these positions and equally all are able to vote in the AGM.

The Board of Ten is led and chaired by the president and Convener and consists of: President and Convener; the Treasurer; the Chief Whip; the chair of Ways and Means; the Clerk; the steward to the House (Social Secretary); the Media Officers (two); the Diversity and Inclusion Officer; the director of Student Development and Activities; and the Parent(s) of the House. The First Secretary to the House is appointed by the president and Convenor as their deputy. The Board of Ten is responsible for the overarching organisation of the society and serves as the executive committee of the Union Debating Society. They meet weekly and minutes of these meetings are collected and kept with records dating back almost a century.

The Competitive Debates Subcommittee is chaired by the Chief Whip and consists of: the Chief Whip; the Competitions Secretary; the Training Officer; the Schools Competition Officer; the Schools Outreach Officer; the Competitive Equity Officer; and the Freshers' Representative. They are responsible for organising all inter-varsity competitive affairs including competition attendance, internal training sessions, and school outreach. They are responsible for organising the regular training sessions that take place on Wednesday afternoons as well as the advanced training sessions for international competitions. Equally, they organise which inter-varsity competitions are attended and who attends - with the aim to allow every student who shows an interest the ability to attend at least one IV competition a semester. The Schools Outreach program has seen considerable revision in recent years. The annual and prestigious St Andrews Schools Competition is run for any Scottish Schools to send teams to. In recent years, the Union Debating Society has aided First Chances set up regular debate training as part of their offering to underprivileged identified pupils in Fife. The Competitive Debates Subcommittee meet weekly, with the Chief Whip representing the Subcommittee at Board of Ten meetings.

The Public Debates Subcommittee is chaired by the chair of Ways and Means and consists of: the chair of Ways and Means; the Serjeant-at-Arms; and the Public Debates Secretary. They are responsible for the planning and organising of the wider society interaction with the St Andrews University student community. This consists of organising the weekly public debates - drawing in a wide-range of prominent external speakers - and organising all of the social affairs of the society. The Public Debates Subcommittee meet weekly, with the chair of Ways and Means representing the Subcommittee at Board of Ten meetings.

== Traditions ==
At the start of a debate the convenor welcomes those gathered to the current session of 'the University of St Andrews Union Debating Society, which brings a cheer of 'hear hear' from the audience.

At debates students wear academic gowns including the scarlet gowns of the United College, the black of St Mary's College, the black postgraduate gowns of St Leonard's College, or an appropriate graduate gown.

On the basis that the society has always claimed to have provided good value for money (unlike other student debating societies like the Oxford Union or Durham Union, both membership and attendance at debates are free to all students) when a monetary amount is mentioned in a speech, those attending the debate cry "How much?"; the sum is then repeated, to which the audience responds "That's cheap!".

The minutes are read at the beginning of each debate in a caricature style of some relevant figure, but inevitably someone would rather proceed to the main debate, and so raises a point of order, moving that the minutes be taken as read; another member rises in opposition to the motion. At this stage a vote is taken by 'oral acclamation' — the announcement of which is met with a cry of 'Oohh', and after a vote the convenor generally believes to be closer than is apparent to the rest of the House (who nearly always believe that the 'nays' have it, which would result in the minutes being read in full), the minutes are taken as read, and the convenor requested to 'resign' on the basis of having effectively overruled the House.

The society's motto is Pro Amicitia Et Litteris — 'for friendship and learning'. The Gaudeamus used to be sung at the end of each debate, as the Board of Ten and speakers process out of the chamber but now they simply rise and leave at the command of the president.

The society also owns a sword, affectionately known as Bessie, which is said to be used by the sergeant at arms to protect the authority of the speaker: in practice it symbolises the authority of the House, in the manner of a ceremonial mace.

== Notable presidents ==
- 1933-34 George Kennedy Young
- 1958-59 John MacGregor
- 1973-74 Eamonn F. Butler
- 1974-75 Eamonn F. Butler
- 1992-93 Ian Duncan

== See also ==
- Graham Stewart The Union Debating Society 1794–1990: A History of Debating at St Andrews University (D.C. Thomson)
