= Student gown =

Student gowns (or more correctly undergraduate gowns) are a form of academic dress worn by undergraduate students at a number of institutions. There used to be many different gowns for different ranks of undergraduates, but these were abolished in the 20th century. Currently there are just one or two gowns for a single class of undergraduate. The exception is Cambridge University, where each college has its own gown, though technically all undergraduate students are of the same rank or standing.

== Ancient universities in the United Kingdom ==
- Undergraduate gowns in Scotland (red gowns)
  - Academic dress of the University of St Andrews
- Academic dress of the University of Oxford
- Academic dress of the University of Cambridge
