= Lochgelly High School =

Location
- Station Road; Lochgelly, Fife, KY5 8LZ; Scotland; 56.1378°N 3.3168°W

Information
- Type: Secondary
- Motto: Optimum Cuique (The best for everyone)
- Established: 1987
- Local authority: Fife Council
- Rector: Ross Stewart
- Age: 11 to 18
- Houses: Fleming, Dewar, Telford and Kelvin
- Website: https://www.lochgellyhighschool.co.uk/

Lochgelly High School is a non-denominational secondary school located in Lochgelly, Fife. The school's catchment area covers Lochgelly and the surrounding towns and villages of Ballingry, Cardenden, Crosshill, Glencraig and Lochore. The school has more than double the Scottish average number of students entitled to free school meals.

== History ==
Lochgelly High School was built as a joint project between Fife Regional Council and architects, Robert Thomson Fyfe and Joseph Manson. The school opened in 1987. In 2002, the school was awarded with the National Curriculum Award.
