= Ballingry =

Town in Fife, Scotland

Coordinates: 56°09′N 3°20′W

Ballingry: Scottish Gaelic: Baile Iongrach; Bingrie
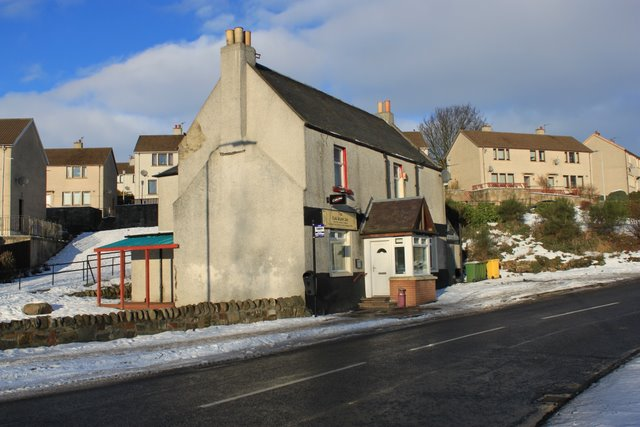

- Location within Fife
- Population: 5,940 (2020)
- Council area: Fife
- Country: Scotland
- Sovereign state: United Kingdom
- Police: Scotland
- Fire: Scottish
- Ambulance: Scottish

Ballingry (/bəˈlɪŋɡəri/ or locally /bəˈlɪŋəri/ or (older) /bɪŋəri/); Scots: Ballingry, Bingry, Scottish Gaelic: Baile Iongrach) is a town in Fife, Scotland. It is near the boundary with Perth and Kinross, north of Lochgelly. It has an estimated population of 5,940 in 2020. The once separate villages of Ballingry, Lochore, Crosshill, and Glencraig are now somewhat joined together as the part of the Benarty area. Ballingry, along with its neighbour Lochgelly, is one of Fife's 'regeneration areas' and is classed as in need of regeneration economically and socially.

== History ==
In 1160 the Parish of Ballingry and Auchterderran belonged to the Barony of Lochore. A church was built in the area to attend to the needs of the people. In 1561 Peter Watson was sent to minister to the people of Ballingry.

Rev Jamie obtained most facts from old Kirk Session Records, fourteen volumes in various sizes were discovered. These minutes go back to 1669. It is believed that Ballingry is one of the oldest Parishes in Scotland. The present church building dates from 1831.

Following World War II, plans went into effect to create a settlement to house the population drawn to this part of Fife by the opportunities created by what was then an expanding coal industry.

=== Toponymy ===
The name Ballingry may come from the Scottish Gaelic baile iongrach, meaning "oozing estate", possibly from the springs on the slopes above the town.\It may also be 'the village of Jesus (or, the church') or something similar, in that the name is a combination of the Gaelic 'Ball', or village, and 'INRI' for 'Jesus'.

== Schools ==
It has a large primary school, Benarty Primary School, as well as a smaller Roman Catholic primary school, St Kenneth's, one of seven feeder schools to St. Columba's Roman Catholic High School in Dunfermline.

== Facilities ==
Opened in October 2012 to replace a number of facilities in Ballingry, Lochore and Crosshill, the Benarty Centre houses contains Fife Council offices, a library, childcare and catering facilities, a computer suite, gym, meeting room and café. Ballingry is also located very close to Lochore Meadows Country Park which includes the loch itself, as well as a large park for children, a canoe club and a 9-hole golf course. The village had its own junior football team, Ballingry Rovers FC which dissolved in late 2014 after 62 years, they played as part of the East Region Junior League.

The village has four shops, a chemist, two pubs (The Craigie and the Cleik), a bookmakers, Chinese and Indian takeaways and two chip shops.

== Transport ==
Stagecoach operates the 19 service between Ballingry and Rosyth which runs through Lochore, Crosshill, Glencraig, Lochgelly, Lumphinans, Cowdenbeath, Hill of Beath, Crossgates, Halbeath and Dunfermline, operating at up to every ten minutes on week days and Saturdays. The 34 service runs between Ballingry and Kirkcaldy.The 81 service operates hourly between Queen Margaret Hospital in Dunfermline and Glenrothes, with stops in between in Cowdenbeath and Ballingry.

The nearest railway station is Lochgelly, with services to Dunfermline, Edinburgh, Kinghorn, Burntisland, Glenrothes and Kirkcaldy.

== Notable people ==
- Singer-songwriter and filmmaker Richard Jobson
- Footballer Doug Rougvie
- Rock’n’Roll/Punk band Paris Street Rebels
- Michael Nardone
- John George, a miner who became a Unionist MP.
- Thomas Hardy was minister here from 1774 to 1784
