= Academic dress of the University of St Andrews =

Academic dress at the University of St Andrews involves students wearing distinctive academic gowns whilst studying at the University of St Andrews. Undergraduate gowns in Scotland were once common at all the ancient universities of Scotland, with each having its own distinctive style. St Andrews undergraduates wear either a scarlet gown if they are part of the United College and studying in the Faculties of Arts, Medicine and Science, or a black gown if they are part of St Mary's College and studying in the Faculty of Divinity.

"St Andrews is the only one of the Scottish universities where the gown is still seen frequently in the twenty-first century. It is worn to chapel services, formal dinners in the halls of residence, meetings of the Union Debating Society, by student ambassadors who give guided tours of the University to visitors and by a few to examinations. Most conspicuously, it is worn for the traditional pier walk, which takes place each Sunday in term-time after chapel."

Until 2012 postgraduate students wore the gown of their earlier academic achievement before joining. In that year The St Leonard's College Society of the university introduced a black gown faced with burgundy for the use of those who do not have academic dress in order to integrate such students into the tradition of gown wearing present at St Andrews. Graduates may continue to use either the academic dress of their earlier degree or the newly introduced St Leonard's College gown. Graduates in St Mary's College, however, always wear the degree gown of a graduate with a violet saltire cross added to the left facing.

The officials of the University, including the Chancellor, Principal, and Rector have distinctive gowns attached to their office, with the claim that the Rector's is based on the mediaeval style of academic dress. Student officers of the University of St Andrews Students' Association and the Athletic Union have gowns which have both the coat of arms of the University and the coat of arms of either the Students' Association or the Athletic Union, which they may wear during their year in elected office.

== Use of academic dress ==
Academic dress has been worn in the University of St Andrews since mediaeval times. Academic dress is compulsory at official ceremonial occasions, such as graduation and the installations of Rector and Chancellor. Gowns may be worn at any time throughout St Andrews. They are recommended for formal dinners in the halls of residence and are traditionally worn to chapel, to 'Pier Walks', and to debates of the Union Debating Society. Gowns are also always worn by University Ambassadors when conducting tours of the University grounds for prospective students and by the collegiate chapel choirs of St Salvator and St Leonard.

Even though most students will buy a gown during their time in the university, its requirement is no longer enforced.

== University officials ==
The officials of the University of St Andrews each have a specific gown specified in regulations, with the Chancellor wearing a black gown trimmed with gold that resembles the state robes worn by the Lord Chancellor or the Speaker of the House of Commons. The Vice-Chancellor, who is the Chancellor's depute for the awarding of degrees, wears a similar gown trimmed with silver. The Principal, the chief executive of the University, wears a purple silk gown, and the Rector wears a purple-blue silk gown (claimed to be based on a mediaeval design). Other officers including Vice-Principals, the Master of the United College, the Principal of St Mary's College, the Provost of St Leonard's College and the Deans of the Faculties wear gowns distinctive to their office. The description of their academic dress in full:

- Chancellor: Black brocaded silk gown with long closed sleeves and a square collar, trimmed with gold lace and gold frogs worn with a black velvet trencher trimmed with gold lace and with a gold tassel.
  - Chancellor's Assessor: Black silk gown with long closed sleeves, each ornamented with two gold frogs worn with a black velvet trencher cap with a black tassel.
  - Vice Chancellor: Black brocaded silk gown with long closed sleeves and a square collar, trimmed with silver lace and silver frogs worn with a black velvet trencher trimmed with silver lace and with a silver tassel.
- Principal: Purple corded silk gown with full sleeves, faced with purple velvet worn with a black velvet trencher trimmed with silver lace and with a silver tassel.
  - Deputy Principal: Purple wool Panama gown with full sleeves, faced with black velvet.
  - Vice Principal: Black wool Panama gown with full sleeves, faced with purple velvet.
- Rector: Purple-blue corded silk gown with full sleeves, tippet, and hood, faced and lined with maroon silk and with a maroon velvet collar worn with a black velvet trencher trimmed with silver lace and with a silver tassel. It is claimed by R.G. Cant that this form of academic dress was modelled on mediaeval dress from the University of Paris.
  - Rector's Assessor: Purple-blue silk gown with long open sleeves and a maroon velvet collar worn with a black velvet trencher cap with a black tassel.
- Heads of Colleges: The heads of the three colleges of the University each wear a similar gown differentiated by the colour of the silk collar.
  - Master of the United College: Black silk gown with long closed lace-decorated sleeves, with a red silk collar.
  - Principal of St Mary's College: Black silk gown with long closed lace-decorated sleeves, with a purple silk collar.
  - Provost of St Leonard's College: Black silk gown with long closed lace-decorated sleeves, with a white silk collar.
- Deans: Silk gown of the colour of the hood of the principal degree of the faculty, with square collar facings of the colour of the lining of that hood worn with a round velvet cap of the colour of the hood.

== Undergraduate dress ==
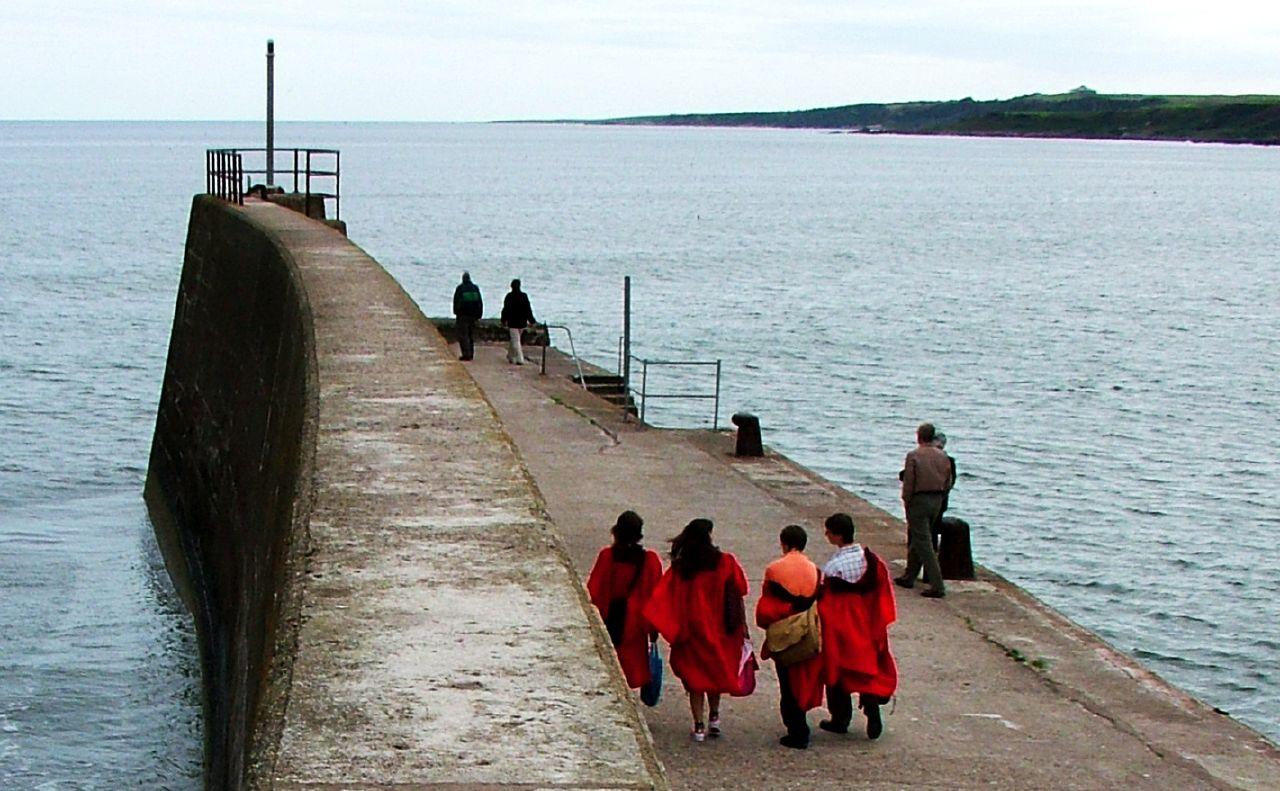
Gowned St Andrews undergraduates on the town pier.

Undergraduate students in the United College (in full, United College of St Salvator and St Leonard), who are members of the Faculties of Arts, Medicine, and Science wear a scarlet cloth gown of knee length with open sleeves half the length of the gown and a burgundy velveteen collar. Undergraduates of St Mary's College who are members of the Faculty of Divinity wear a black stuff gown of knee length with short open sleeves and with a violet cross of St Andrew on the left facing. At formal occasions, undergraduates, especially those in the University's Chapel Choirs, use the gown as part of the subfusc outfit which is required on such occasions. The gowns used to be compulsory in lectures and tutorials, and it was mandatory for students to wear it around town to identify undergraduates, but since the middle of the 20th century the wearing of the gown, while encouraged, is voluntary.

Students in the United College, by tradition, wear the gown differently depending on their year of study:

- First-years (Bejants) wear the gown high on the shoulders;
- Second years (Semi-Bejants) wear it lower on the shoulders;
- Third year students (Tertians) wear it off the right shoulder if in the Faculties of Medicine or Science, and off the left shoulder if in the Faculty of Arts.
- Fourth year students (Magistrands) wear it off both shoulders.

The red undergraduate gown was a source of controversy in 2018 when the University of St Andrews took legal action against an independent supplier, Churchill Gowns, which had offered the gowns for sale at a lower price than the University Shop.

== Postgraduate dress ==
In 2012 a new St Leonard's College gown was introduced for those members of that College whose original universities do not have academic dress. This is black gown faced with burgundy. It was introduced so as to better integrate those postgraduates whose original universities do not have academic dress into the gown tradition at St Andrews. St Andrews graduates wear the gown of their degree as may those of other universities, or they may choose to wear the St Leonard's College gown. Graduate students in St Mary's College wear the graduate gown with a violet cross on the left facing.

Otherwise graduates wear the gown of the highest degree conferred upon them with or without the appropriate hood, depending upon the occasion. Doctors wear undress, a black stuff or silk gown with long closed sleeves, when teaching and during other informal occasions and full-dress, a silk gown of the colour of the appropriate faculty, on festal occasions.

== Graduation ==
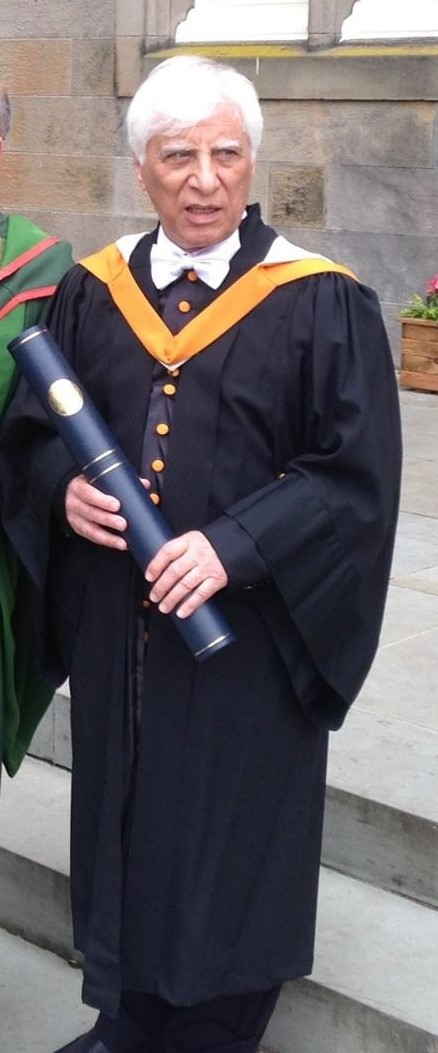
Bahram Beyzai in a St Andrews black cassock, having just received a D.Litt. honoris causa, June 2017

=== Gowns ===
All in attendance at graduation ceremonies are expected to wear subfusc, which comprises a dark lounge suit and a white shirt and white bow-tie for gentlemen and dark trousers or skirt and a white blouse for ladies. Gowns and caps appropriate to a person's degree or official position within the university are worn according to the rules set down by the Senatus Academicus.

- Ordinary Graduands wear a black stuff or silk Master's gown with the crescent-cut sleeves facing outwards (ie cut on the other side of the closed sleeve from those of Oxford, Cambridge etc), and carry the hood proper to the degree to be conferred.
- Honorary Graduands wear undress, a black, silk, full-sleeved cassock with buttons and cincture of the appropriate faculty colour and carry the hood proper to the degree to be conferred. They can wear either a black cloth mortar board with a black tassel or in the case of doctors receiving honorary degrees, a velvet birretum.
- Doctors in full-dress wear a silk gown, similar to the Cambridge Mus. D. pattern, of the colour of the appropriate degree hood and carry a black velvet John Knox cap.
- Graduates (other than doctors) wear the gown and hood appropriate to their highest degree and carry a black cloth square cap.
- Undergraduates wear the gown appropriate to their college and carry the cap appropriate to their year of study.

=== Hoods ===
Hoods of graduates in all faculties are in a modified London pattern, with rounded corners to the cape and an angled liripipe.

- Doctor of Divinity (D.D.): Violet silk or cloth lined with ermine or white satin.
- Doctor of Languages (D.Lang.): Brunswick Green silk lined with white satin.
- Doctor of Letters (D.Litt.): Saffron yellow silk lined with ermine or white satin.
- Doctor of Medicine (M.D.): Medici Crimson silk or cloth with an ivory white lining.
- Doctor of Music (Mus. D.): Sky blue silk or cloth lined with ermine or white satin.
- Doctor of Laws (LL.D.): Pimento silk or cloth lined with ermine or white satin.
- Doctor of Philosophy (Ph.D.): Spectrum blue silk lined with white satin.
- Doctor of Science (D.Sc.): Purple-lilac silk or cloth lined with ermine or white satin.
- Master of Arts (M.A.): Black silk with cherry silk lining.
- Master in Chemistry (M.Chem.): Black silk with a three-inch lilac silk or cloth border.
- Master in Mathematics (M.Math.): Black silk with a three-inch lilac silk or cloth border.
- Master of Letters (M.Litt.): Black silk lined with saffron yellow silk or cloth.
- Master of Philosophy (M.Phil.): Black silk lined with gold silk or cloth.
- Master in Physics (M.Phys.): Black silk with a three-inch lilac silk or cloth border.
- Master in Science (M.Sci.): Black silk with a three-inch lilac silk or cloth border.
- Master of Science (M.Sc.): Black silk lined with lilac silk or cloth.
- Master of Theology (M. Theol.): Black silk lined with violet silk or cloth.
- Bachelor of Divinity (B.D.): Violet silk or cloth bordered with white fur.
- Bachelor of Letters (B.Litt.): Saffron yellow silk bordered with white fur.
- Bachelor of Philosophy (B.Phil.): Gold silk bordered with white fur.
- Bachelor of Science (B.Sc.): Magenta silk or cloth bordered with white fur.

== Student officers ==
The University of St Andrews Students' Association and Athletic Union have several elected positions which entitle the holder to wear a gown emblazoned with the coats of arms of the Students' Association or Athletic Union and the coat of arms of the University.

- Association President: Full length red gown with blue facings and collar.
- Director of Student Development & Activities: Full length black gown with purple facings and collar.
- Director of Education: Full length black gown with blue facings and collar.
- Director of Events & Services: Full length black gown with gold facings and collar.
- Director of Wellbeing: Full length black gown with green facings and collar.
- President of the Athletic Union: Full length black gown with sky blue facings emblazoned with Full Blue and Half Blue crest.
- Association Chair: Full length black gown with red facings and collar.
- Association LGBT+ Officer: Full length navy gown with rainbow facings.
- SSC Charities Officer: Full length blue gown with blue facings and collar.
- SSC Debates Officer: Full length blue gown with pink facings and collar.
- SSC Volunteering Officer: Full length blue gown with green facings and collar.
- SSC Postgraduate Officer: Full length red gown with red facings and collar.
- SSC Societies Officer: Full length black gown with blue facings and collar.

Additionally, the President of St Mary's College is entitled to wear a graduate dress gown with lace adornments on the sleeve and purple silk lapels. The gown has the shield of St Mary's College on the left breast in fine stitching and bronze filigree.
