= ARD =

ARD or Ard may refer to:

== Arts and media ==
- ARD (broadcaster), the German public broadcaster
  - Das Erste, their main television channel
  - ARD International Music Competition
- Ard, a character in the 1981 film Heavy Metal

== Places ==
=== Republic of Ireland ===
- Ardpatrick, County Limerick
- Ardpatrick, a townland in County Louth

=== United Kingdom ===
- Ard, Inverness, Scotland
- Ardgay railway station, Scotland
- Ardpatrick, Argyll, Scotland
- Ardpatrick, a townland in County Tyrone, Northern Ireland

=== United States ===
- Ard, Arkansas
- Ardmore station (Pennsylvania) (by Amtrak code)

=== Elsewhere ===
- Arad, Iran
- Alor Island Airport, Indonesia (IATA: ARD)

== Politics ==
- Alliance for Restoration of Democracy, a Pakistani political movement
- Democratic Republican Alliance, Alliance Républicaine Démocratique or ARD, a French political party of the Third Republic
- Republican Alliance for Democracy, an opposition party in Djibouti (Alliance Républicaine pour le Développement)
- Right Romania Alliance, Alianţa România Dreaptăa, short-lived electoral alliance in Romania

== Science and technology ==
- Ard., abbreviation in scientific literature for botanist Pietro Arduino
- Ard (plough), a simple plough
- Acid rock drainage, the outflow of acidic water from mines
- Acireductone dioxygenase (iron(II)-requiring), an enzyme
- Aging-associated disease, diseases of senescence
- Alcohol-related dementia
- Antimicrobial Removal Device, Marion Laboratories product
- Apple Remote Desktop, computer application
- Auxiliary repair dock, US Navy floating drydock
- Atmospheric Reentry Demonstrator, ESA spacecraft
- Analysis-ready data (ARD), a form of pre-processed data

== Other uses ==
- Ard (name), a name and surname of Scottish origin
- Army Reconnaissance Detachment 10, a special forces unit of the Swiss Armed Forces
- Accelerated Rehabilitative Disposition, an American pretrial intervention program
- American Research and Development Corporation, one of the first venture capital firms
- Ard Patrick (foaled 1899), a horse

== See also ==
- Ards (disambiguation)
