= Peter Johnstone (footballer) =

Scottish footballer

Personal information
- Full name: Peter Johnstone
- Date of birth: 30 December 1887
- Place of birth: Cowdenbeath, Scotland
- Date of death: 16 May 1917 (aged 29)
- Place of death: Arras, France
- Positions: Outside right; wing half

Senior career*
Years	Team	Apps	(Gls)
- Kelty Rangers
- Glencraig Celtic
1909–1916	Celtic	211	(17)

International career
1914	Scottish League XI	1	(0)
- * Club domestic league appearances and goals

Peter Johnstone (30 December 1887 – 16 May 1917) was a Scottish footballer who played for Celtic.

On leaving school, he worked in his hometown's coalmine, whilst also playing for Junior club Glencraig Celtic. Johnstone signed for Celtic in January 1909, but made only one appearance in his first season at Parkhead. However, he soon became a regular in the side and eventually made over 240 appearances, scoring 29 goals.

During his career he played in a variety of roles at forward, midfield and defence. His main position was at outside-right, but in later years played more often in defence. He won three Scottish Cup medals as well as four League championships with Celtic and was a mainstay in their side for several years. Johnstone was never capped for Scotland but he did play for the Scottish League side in 1914 against the Irish League, as well as representing Glasgow on two occasions.

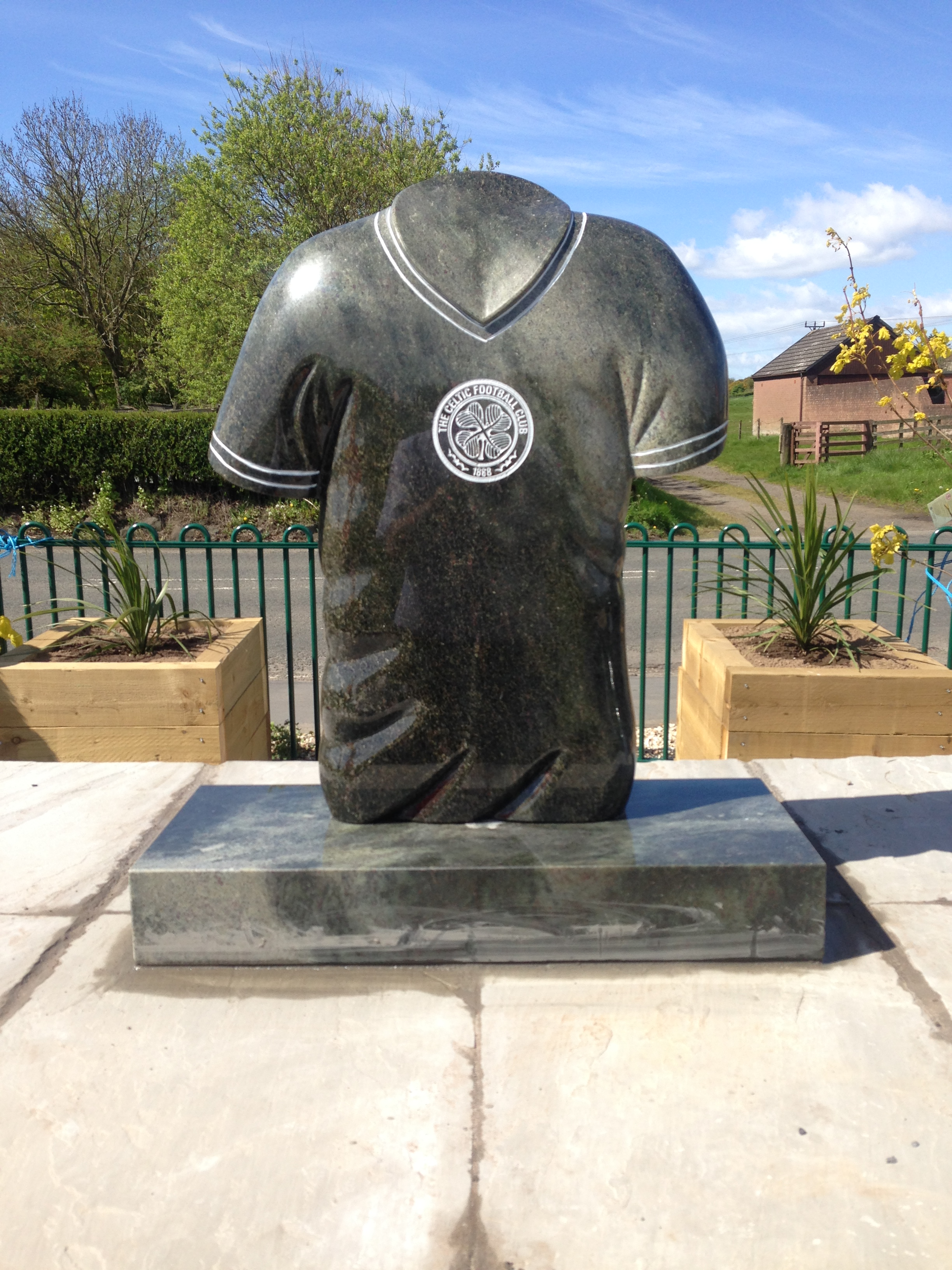
Memorial to Johnstone in Glencraig, Fife

Johnstone enlisted with the army in 1916 to assist the war effort, despite being both a newsagent and a coal-miner – both reserved occupations. He first joined the Argyll and Sutherland Highlanders but later was transferred to the 6th (Territorial Force) Battalion of the Seaforth Highlanders. Johnstone continued to occasionally play for Celtic during his army training, and in September 1916 travelled overnight from England to help his teammates defeat Rangers in a Glasgow Cup tie.

Johnstone died in May 1917 when the 6th Battalion of the Seaforth Highlanders attempted to capture a chemicals factory near Rouex in north-west France during the Battle of Arras. A dedication to his memory is inscribed on the Arras Memorial in the Fauborg d'Amiens Cemetery.

On 23 May 2015, a memorial to Peter Johnstone was unveiled in his home village of Glencraig, Fife by Lisbon Lion John Clark and Fife Council Provost (and former Dunfermline Athletic manager), Jim Leishman. The memorial was designed and funded by the Peter Johnstone Memorial Group.
