= Ards =

Ards (or ARDS, ARDs) may refer to:

== Medical ==
- ARDS, Acute respiratory distress syndrome
- ARDs, age-related diseases

== Places ==
- Ards Peninsula, Northern Ireland
  - Ards (territory), several historical territorial divisions on the Ards Peninsula
    - Ards Lower, a barony in Northern Ireland
    - Ards Upper, a barony in Northern Ireland
  - Ards and North Down, current administrative district on the Ards Peninsula
    - Ards (borough), former administrative district
    - Ards (Northern Ireland Parliament constituency), former constituency
  - Ards Forest Park, a nature reserve in County Donegal, Ireland
  - Newtownards, a town in Northern Ireland, nicknamed "Ards"

== Organizations ==
- Ards Community Hospital, a health facility in Newtownards, Northern Ireland
- Ards F.C., a Northern Irish football club from Newtownards
- Ards RFC, a Northern Irish rugby football club from Newtownards

== Other uses ==
- Advanced Remote Display Station, an early computer terminal
- Ards Circuit, a motor racing circuit in Northern Ireland

== See also ==
- ARD (disambiguation)
