= Bayne's =

Bakery chain in Scotland

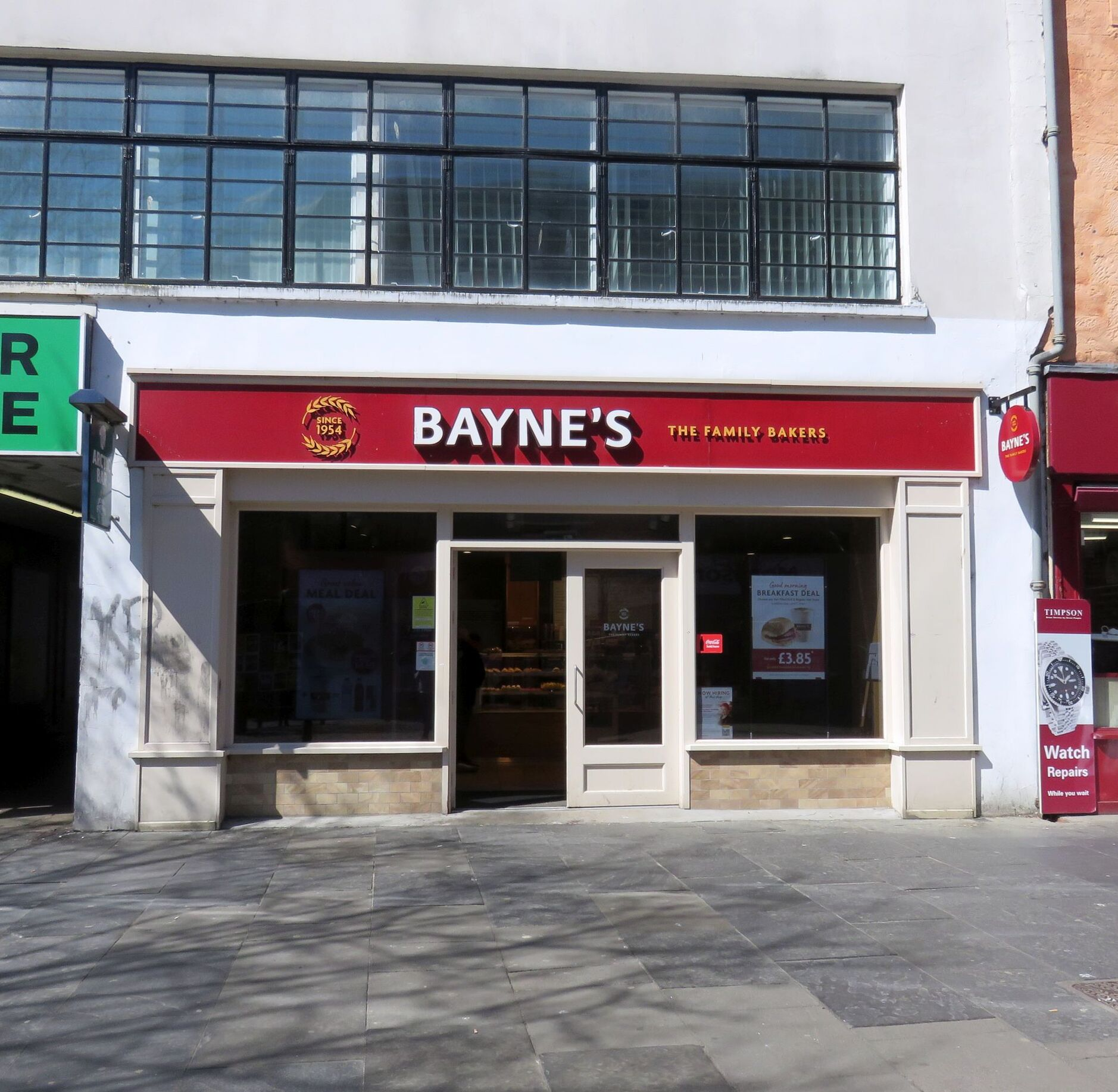
- Branch in Dundee
- Industry: Bakery
- Founded: 1954
- Headquarters: Lochore, Fife,
- Number of locations: 71 (2025)
- Area served: Scotland
- Website: baynes.co.uk

Bayne's is a Scottish bakery chain. It is based in Lochore, Fife. As of 2025 it had 71 branches.
