= Jim Comerford =

Australian trade unionist and writer

Jim Comerford OAM
- Born: 13 September 1913; Glencraig, Scotland
- Died: 8 November 2006 (aged 93); Kurri Kurri, Australia
- Other name: James Comerford
- Occupations: Trade unionist, writer
- Employer: Australian Coal and Shale Employees' Federation
- Spouse: Mabel Comerford
- Children: Jean Andrew

James Comerford (13 September 1913 – 8 November 2006) was an Australian trade unionist, activist, writer and miner who was national general secretary of the Australian Coal and Shale Employees' Federation and served as its Northern New South Wales president from 1953 to 1973.

== Biography ==
=== Early life ===
James Comerford was born in 1913 in Glencraig in Fife, Scotland. When Jim was nine his family moved to Kurri Kurri in the Hunter Valley of New South Wales, Australia after his father had been blacklisted from a Scottish mine. At the age of 13 he got a job at a local newspaper, but he soon left it to work in the mines.

=== 1929–30 lockout and Rothbury riot ===
When he was 15 he was among the miners in the Rothbury riot of 16 December 1929, when a lockout in the collieries of northern New South Wales led to miners charging the gate of the colliery in or near Rothbury and police opened fire on them in response.

=== Union career, activism and politics ===
In 1942 he became the youngest person ever to be elected to the central council of the Australian Coal and Shale Employees' Federation (also known as the Miners' Federation of Australia, and the principal ancestor of the current Mining and Energy Union). He served as its Northern New South Wales president from 1953 until his retirement in 1973, and at various times had other regional and national roles including national general secretary. He was also active in support of various causes including those of the peace movement, adult education, social clubs for workers, union education, retired mineworkers and unemployed workers, and also total abstinence from alcohol as a member of the Independent Order of Rechabites.

Comerford was known to have been a member of the Young Communist League of Australia in 1930 and then the Communist Party of Australia from 1940 to 1959 before joining the Australian Labor Party in 1960; according to his biographer Barbara Heaton he privately remained a Marxist all his life. He was heavily involved in events around the 1949 Australian coal strike and the 1955 Labor Party split.

=== Retirement and writing ===
After his retirement in 1973, Comerford wrote extensively. He wrote or cowrote books on several subjects, including Lockout, an account of the 1929–30 lockout and the violence at Rothbury. The University of Newcastle made him a Convocation Scholar and a writer-in-residence.

He gave a speech in support of the 1995-6 miners' strike at the Vickery coal mine near Boggabri in New South Wales.

At some time between 1997 and his death in 2006 he donated his personal library to the Coalfields Heritage Group of Cessnock, later renamed the Coalfields Local History Association.

=== Marriage and children ===
Jim Comerford was married to Mabel Comerford for 70 years. They had a daughter, Jean Andrew.

=== Death and afterward ===
Comerford died in Kurri Kurri on 8 November 2006, survived by Mabel and Jean Andrew.

== Published works ==
- Comerford, Jim (2006). Lockout: the Northern New South Wales coal lockout 2nd March 1929–3rd June 1930: an eywitness account of Australia's most violent industrial conflict. Sydney: Construction Forestry Mining Energy Union (Australia). ISBN 9780958564779. OCLC 224745828.
- Comerford, Jim (1997). Coal and colonials : the founding of the Australian coal mining industry. Sydney: United Mine Workers Federation of Australia. ISBN 9780646316819. OCLC 38819545.
- Comerford, Jim (1979). Mines, wines and people: a history of Greater Cessnock. Council of the City of Greater Cessnock. ISBN 9780959694802. OCLC 751035495.

== Honours, decorations, awards and distinctions ==
Along with the appointments as Convocation Scholar and writer-in-residence the University of Newcastle awarded Comerford an honorary Master of Arts. In 1989 he was awarded the Medal of the Order of Australia for service to the trade union movement. In nearby Aberdare the Jim Comerford Memorial Wall was dedicated in 1996 to those who died in the mines in the Northern District of the Construction, Forestry, Maritime, Mining and Energy Union, the present-day successor of the Australian Coal and Shale Employees' Federation. Prime Minister of Australia Paul Keating paid tribute to Comerford while unveiling the wall. A bronze bust of Comerford, sculpted by Jody Pawley, was later put in front of the wall and was dedicated in 2007 by Prime Minister Kevin Rudd.

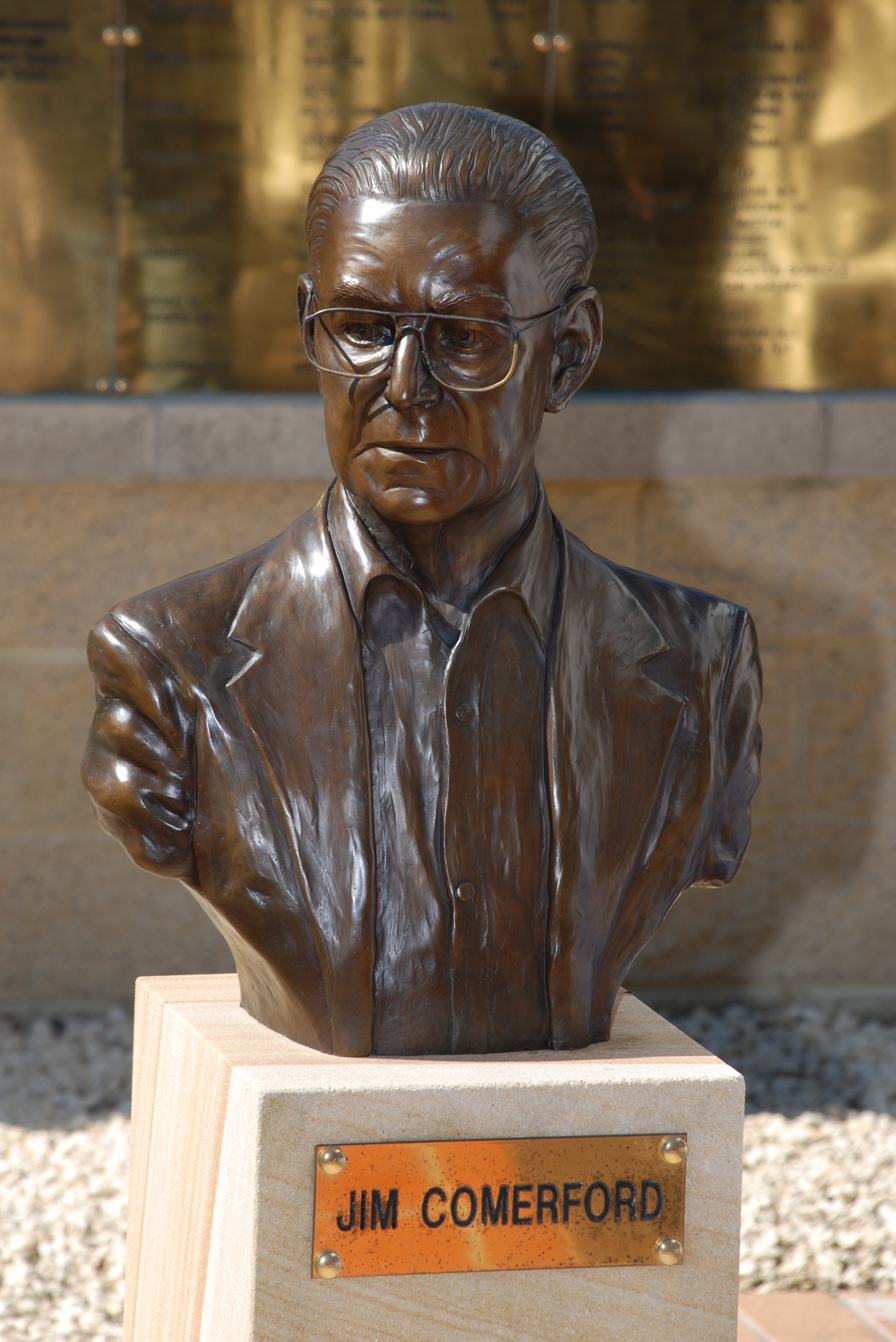
The bust of Jim Comerford at the Memorial Wall in Aberdare in 2012

== Bibliography ==
- Heaton, Barbara Carol (2019). Jim Comerford—Working Class Warrior. Newcastle, New South Wales: Barbara Heaton. ISBN 9780646807188. OCLC 1114289926.
