= Rose Wolfe =

Canadian social worker (1916–2016)

Rose Wolfe OC OOnt

29th Chancellor of the University of Toronto
- In office 1991 – 1997
- President: Robert Prichard
- Preceded by: John Black Aird
- Succeeded by: Hal Jackman

Personal details
- Born: Rose Senderowitz; August 7, 1916 Toronto, Ontario
- Died: December 30, 2016 (aged 100)
- Spouse: Ray Wolfe
- Occupation: social worker, administrator and philanthropist
- Known for: Former Chancellor of University of Toronto
- Awards: Order of Canada; Order of Ontario

Rose Wolfe, CM OOnt (née Senderowitz; August 7, 1916 – December 30, 2016) was a Canadian social worker, administrator and philanthropist. She was Chancellor of the University of Toronto.

== Early life and career ==
Rose was born in Toronto, Ontario, to Morris and Clara Senderowitz, Romanian Jewish immigrants. She was the middle child of four daughters and one son. Somehow, her baker father, who sold loaves of bread for five cents each, managed to send all four daughters to the University of Toronto. "[Rose] once wanted to be a doctor but felt her marks in math were not good enough, so she chose sociology instead" and graduated in 1940 from the University of Toronto. That same year she married Ray Wolfe, the founder and CEO of the Oshawa Group Limited and the founding president of the Canadian Jewish News. She administered the Ray and Rose Wolfe Family Foundation.

She was elected Chancellor of U of T in 1991 and served for two terms until 1997, where she was an advocate for Jewish studies and female leadership. In 1998, the University of Toronto awarded her an honorary doctorate. She died at the age of 100 on December 30, 2016.

== Awards ==
In 1992, she was awarded the Order of Ontario. In 1999, she was made a Member of the Order of Canada for her work as "a defender of social justice, whose extensive and tireless involvement with many boards and committees has made her a dynamic contributor to society".

Academic offices
Preceded by John Black Aird	Chancellor of the University of Toronto; 1991–1997	Succeeded by Hal Jackman
