= Lochore =

Village in Fife, Scotland

Coordinates: 56.15588°N 3.32330°W

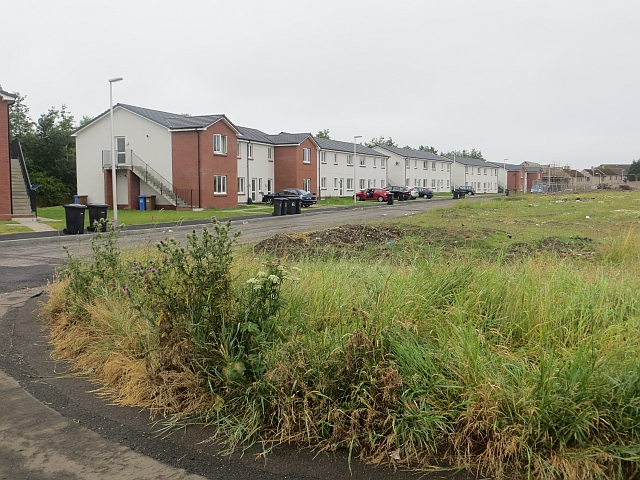
Rosewell Drive, Lochore

Lochore (Scottish Gaelic: Loch Oir) is a former mining village in Fife, Scotland. It takes its name from the nearby Loch Ore. It is largely joined to the adjacent villages of Ballingry to the north and Crosshill to the south.

== Education ==
Most of the children in Lochore go to the large primary school, Benarty Primary School, a feeder school to Lochgelly High School or alternatively the smaller Roman Catholic Primary school, Saint Kenneth's, in neighbouring Ballingry, which is one of seven feeder schools to St. Columba's R.C. High School in Dunfermline.

== Local facilities ==
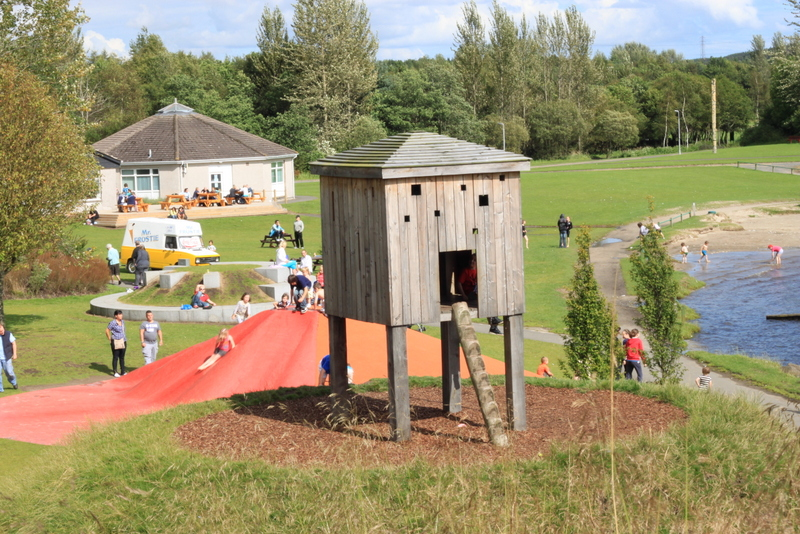
Lochore Meadows

Lochore is located near Lochore Meadows Country Park which is used mainly for leisure purposes, especially yachting, although the uneven depth can make the likes of speed boating problematic. The Loch holds the annual Scottish Open Water Championships where the swimmers compete in a 5 km, 2 km and 4×1 km relay swim. The country park also has a 9-hole golf course where the local club is Lochore Meadows Golf Club. Formally Ballingry Golf Club

Lochore has a Cooperative Foodstore, Nisa, Marios Fish and Chip Bar, and Bayne's who previously owned the local butchers prior to its sale. Baynes is the largest employer in the area with the bakehouse located in Lochore. There is also a small corner shop located in the other end called Lochore Foodstore.

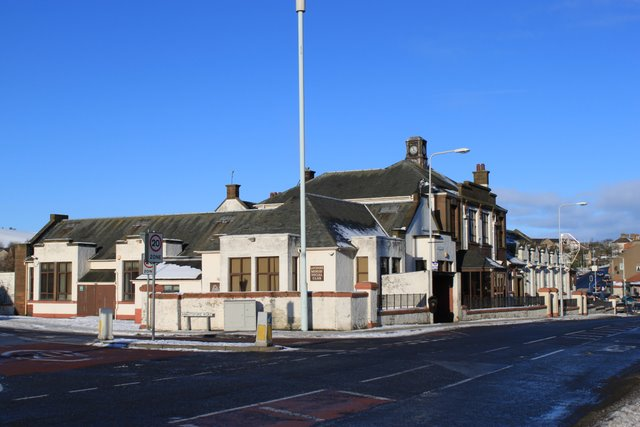
Lochore Miners Social Club

There are two bars, Lochore Institute, a former miners institute with a bowling green, and the Red Goth.

The village has Benarty Medical practice and Rosewell Pharmacy and an NHS Clinic.

There is also a police station operated by Police Scotland.

== Transport ==
The only method of public transport is bus.

19 - Goes from Dunfermline to Ballingry passes through Lochore.
34 - Goes from Kirkcaldy to Ballingry passes through Lochore.
81 - Goes from Dunfermline to Glenrothes passes through Lochore.

There is also a much smaller local bus, the 20, which goes from Lochore to Lochgelly.

The nearest railway station is Lochgelly railway station.
