= Undergraduate gowns in Scotland =

Academic dress code

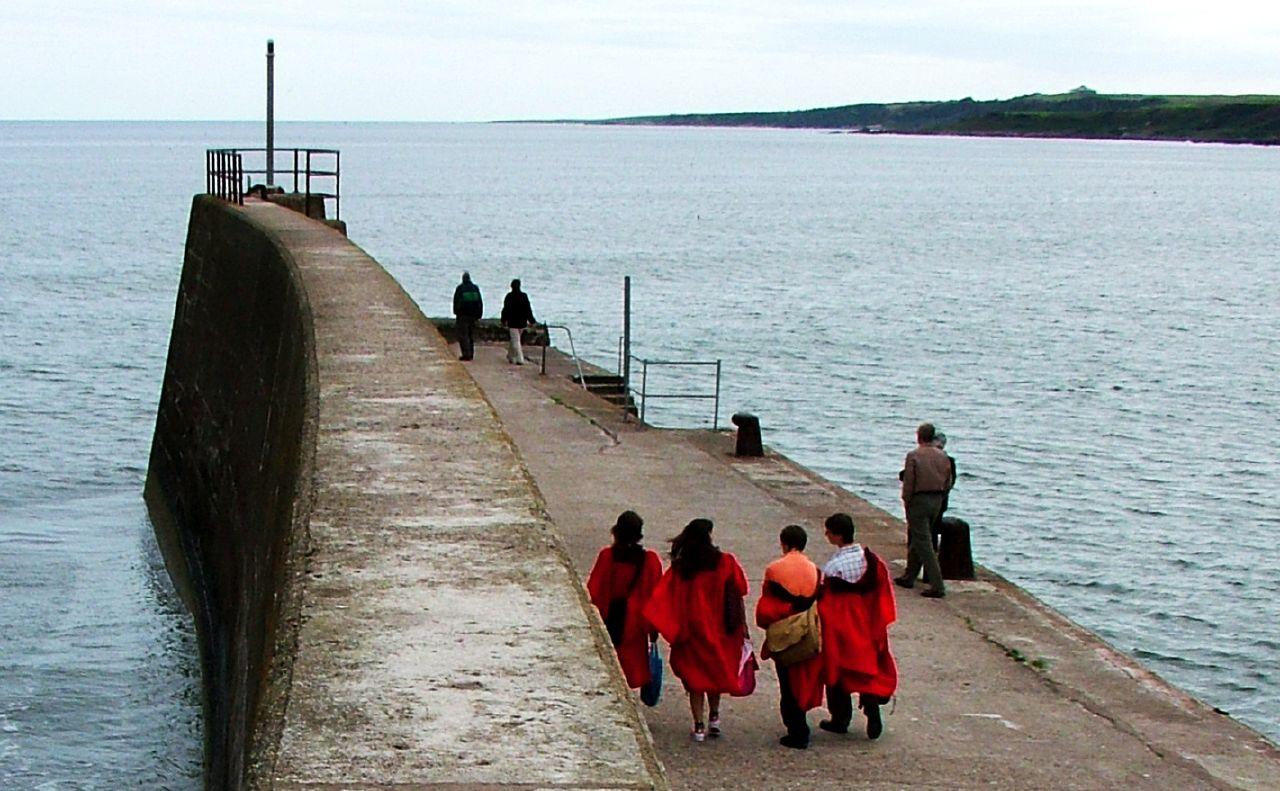
Gowned St Andrews undergraduates on the town pier

Undergraduate gowns are a notable feature of academic dress for students at the ancient universities in Scotland.

The most famous form of Scottish undergraduate dress is the red or scarlet gown. The gown is typically made of a thick woollen or wool-like material and is differentiated slightly according to the university at which it is worn. These gowns are worn by students of the University of St Andrews, Glasgow, Aberdeen, Edinburgh and Dundee. The University of Strathclyde did not adopt the red gown, and instead students use the black supertunica, adorned with saltire blue buttons and cords.

== History ==
It is likely that pre-Reformation undergraduates would have worn a black supertunica in common with students at all European universities of the time. By the latter part of James VI's reign, this had formalised into scarlet. Traditionally, the red colour was symbolic of a lower status, and was particularly visible. The post-Reformation gown evolved as a uniform for students, its visibility preventing them from engaging in illicit activities in their university towns.

In his work, A tour thro' the Whole Island of Great Britain, Daniel Defoe notes the presence of the gowns at the Universities of Glasgow and St Andrews in the early 18th century, but also their absence at Edinburgh.

In reference to the University of Glasgow:

Here is a principal, with regents and professors in every science, as there is at Edinburgh, and the scholars wear gowns, which they do not at Edinburgh. Their gowns here are red, but the Masters of Arts, and professors, wear black gowns, with a large cape of velvet to distinguish them.

In reference to the University of St Andrews:

the students wear gowns here of a scarlet-like colour, but not in grain, and are very numerous

The "toga rubra" name, mainly popular at Aberdeen, was also used more widely, and declined with educational reform. A significant example of this is the actions of John Anderson, a professor at the University of Glasgow and founder of what went on to become the University of Strathclyde. During his tenure he opened up lectures specifically to cater to the working population of Glasgow, and in order to make their attendance more straightforward certain formalities, such as the red gown, were dispensed with - a move which was looked upon unfavourably by university authorities. As such, these became known as his "Anti-toga classes".

=== University of Glasgow ===
The University of Glasgow's undergraduate gown is as follows: "Scarlet cloth, with full sleeves half the length of the gown. A difference indicating the Faculty may be worn in the form of a narrow band of silk on the breast of each side of the gown of the colour of the hood-lining proper to the lowest degree in the Faculty".

=== University of Aberdeen ===
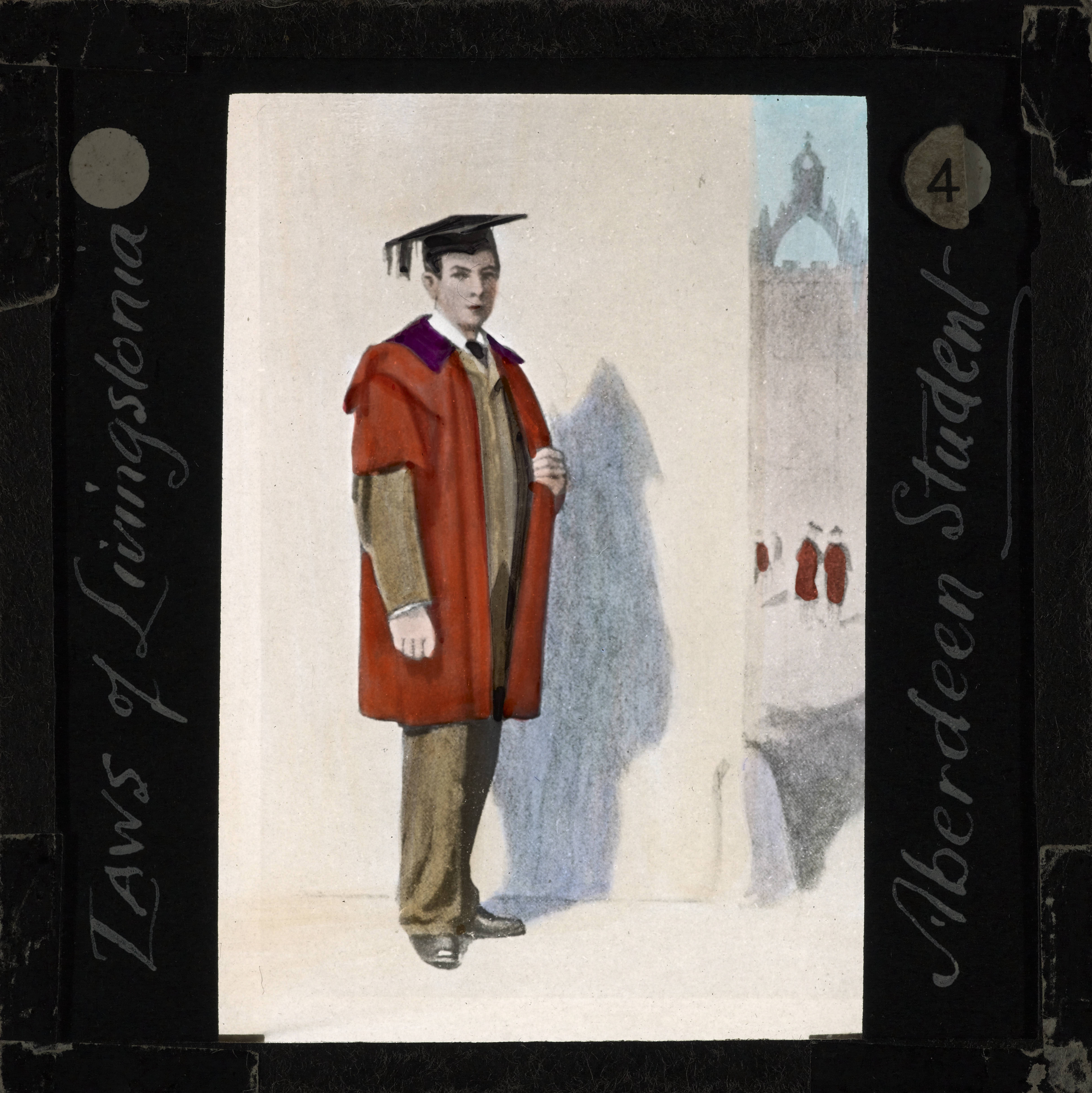

At the University of Aberdeen, and particularly within the predecessor King's College, the gown (or toga rubra) has had varied fortunes over the years. During one of the slumps in use in 1885, it was noted that fewer than one-quarter of students wore it and was largely restricted to arts students at King's College. Regulations existed compelling gown-wearing amongst students, although they were rarely enforced. In 1888, a plebiscite was organised at King's by the students' representative council, which continued to support compulsion by 258 votes to 32, and was recognised by the University's Senate. This was to little avail, with the gown still not becoming universal as it had been previously, and remaining subject to fashion. In the 1850s, Sir George Reid painted an image of an Aberdeen student in the gown, entitled "Salve Toga Rubra".

The toga was criticised as being unsuited to the climate of Aberdeen. It was considered proper amongst students to wear an old and worn gown. A tradition of 'gown-tearing' by older students to new 'bajans' (first years) therefore developed. Matriculation at Aberdeen traditionally occurred on the first Sunday of term; out of enforced respect for Sabbath, students would wait until the following Monday to engage in a 'tearing day'. Despite the cost of gowns, attempts to outlaw this practice were difficult to enforce, particularly as all students of the era carried a penknife in order to mend quills.

Opposition to the gown was also evident, during a 1922 attempt to build 'Varsity Spirit' and restore to wide use the 'traditional and honoured dress' of students, an anti-gown group was formed to protest at its restoration to prominence. In 1924, their views were aired in the university newspaper, stating:

when we leave the gates of King's we become citizens of Aberdeen in this year of grace 1924, and we ought to dress as such. We ought to do nothing which might serve to separate or to alienate us from the general body the citizens

This element of separation often caused gowned students to be jeered by the local children of the city.

== Use ==
The undergraduate gown has lost popularity at different times in the different universities. The requirements of town residence made it impractical, however the more isolated locations of Aberdeen and St Andrews (and by extension, Dundee) ensured a longer heritage.

At present, the gowns are most commonly a feature associated with the University of St Andrews where they are somewhat commonly worn by students to formal events, pier walks, chapel services, and debating society debates, despite their use not being compulsory. Very occasionally are they still worn to examinations. They are only very rarely found in everyday usage at the other institutions, although are still occasionally seen worn by debaters, societies, student representatives, choirs and attendees at formal events and chapel services. It is perhaps most commonly seen at academic ceremonies, particularly in relation to the installation of a new Rector.

The undergraduate style influences several gowns of office, particularly for members of students' representative councils and Rectors.

== Appearance ==
University of Dundee gown on a hanger, obverse and reverse shown

=== Colour ===
The colour of the red undergraduate gown is rarely defined precisely, however the University of Dundee and the University of St Andrews set the correct colour as "Union Jack red" (BCC210).

=== Differencing ===
There are several differences between the gowns at the various universities, including:

- Aberdeen - The gown is shorter than others and is often referred to as a "toga rubra" or simply a toga. The gown was captured in the painting Salve Toga Rubra (Latin: Hail the Red Gown) by Sir George Reid, viewable here; it is an amalgamation of the gowns of King's College, Aberdeen and Marischal College, the Aberdeen University Review stating that the velvet collar is associated with Marischal and the arms associated with the King's gown.
- Dundee - The student gown is described in the University Handbook as '"A gown of nap material in Union Jack red (BCC210) with cape sleeves and with a yoke and collar and abbreviated square patch facings in serge or flannel of Stewart blue."'
- Edinburgh - The gown is entirely scarlet.
- Glasgow - Permits a "narrow band of silk on the breast of each side of the gown of the colour of the hood-lining proper to the lowest degree in the Faculty" to adorn the gown.
- St Andrews - the gown has a maroon yoke and collar, usually made of velvet to contrast with the woollen fabric of the main gown.

The various colleges of St Andrews wear differing gowns; the distinction between United College and Queen's College existed even before the latter became independent as the University of Dundee. Today, the students of St Mary's College (the Faculty of Divinity) wear a simple black gown with a violet/purple St Andrews cross on the left breast. Post-graduates in St Mary's College wear the graduate gown with the violet/purple saltire cross in the left facing. The members of the non-statutory St Leonard's College are not entitled to wear the red gown as the college has no undergraduates amongst its number. They wear the graduate gown of their earlier degree (if that institution has academic dress), or the black gown with burgundy facings of St Leonard's College which was introduced in recent years for such post-graduates.

- Strathclyde - Strathclyders instead use the pre-Reformation black supertunica. The supertunica may be worn casually or formally, but it is never compulsory for lectures, as a testament to John Anderson's objections. The gown is similar to that MA gown used at Oxford University, except the cords and buttons on the sleeve and around the yoke are in Saltire Blue. This is a tradition which is unique to Strathclyde.

== Specialist gowns ==
=== Gowns of office ===
Many universities also have gowns of office for their student representatives. These are often variants inspired by the red gown, often differenced by facings.

The Glasgow University Students' Representative Council executive uses wholly purple gowns. Full listings of gowns worn by the University of St Andrews Students' Association are available at the Academic dress of the University of St Andrews entry. The University of Strathclyde Students' Association executive use the black supertunica with the university logo embroidered on the front at each side. The President also enjoys gold embroidery on the sleeves.

=== Other undergraduate gowns ===
- St Mary's College at the University of St Andrews, that is to say the New College of the Assumption of the Blessed Virgin Mary, (in effect, the faculty of divinity) uses plain black gowns for its undergraduates. The gown is described as being made of black stuff, knee length with short open sleeves and with a violet cross of St Andrew on the left facing. The colour of the cross corresponds to the material used for hoods in the Faculty of Divinity. Black lined with violet (MTheol) and Violet with the cowl and apron edged with white fur (BD). The reason for this gown being black, despite being an undergraduate gown is that in times gone by all members of St Mary's College were graduates and so despite the fact that this is no longer the case, the black gown has been preserved. As noted above post-graduates in St Mary's College wear the graduate gown with the violet/purple saltire cross in the left facing.

== Notes ==
Footnotes

References

- Academic dress of the University of Dundee
- Academic dress of the University of Glasgow
