= Peter Aird =

Scottish footballer (1921–2000)

Personal information
- Full name: Peter Aird, Jr.
- Date of birth: 29 August 1921
- Place of birth: Glencraig, Scotland
- Date of death: 6 December 2000 (aged 79)
- Place of death: Glenrothes, Scotland
- Position: Central defender

Senior career*
Years	Team	Apps	(Gls)
- Bowhill Rovers
- Lochee Harp
1946–1951	Hibernian	44	(0)
1951–1954	East Fife	31	(0)
- Llanelli
Total		75	(0)
- * Club domestic league appearances and goals

Peter Aird, Jr. (29 August 1921 – 6 December 2000) was a Scottish professional footballer, who played in the Scottish Football League for Hibernian and East Fife.

== Biography ==
Aird was born into a coal-mining community of Glencraig, Fife. His family had come from Ayrshire to work in the mines. His father, also named Peter Aird, served as a corporal in the Gordon Highlanders during the First World War, and played for local side Glencraig Rovers with future professionals Mick Gilhooley and Bob Rowan.

In 1927, Peter Aird, Sr. was among 20 miners convicted of mobbing and rioting during a strike at the Glencraig Colliery. The miners were convicted assaulting police officers and other miners returning to work and causing significant damage to the colliery equipment and buildings. According to a local historian, Peter Aird was not involved in the violence but—as he was a member of the Communist Party of Great Britain—was singled out to serve as an example. He served nine months in jail and was blacklisted after his release, forcing the family to move to Bowhill near Cardenden.

At age 14, Peter Aird, Jr. left school to work at the Bowhill Colliery, just a few years after the Bowhill mining disaster. Inspired by his elder brother Willie Aird — a centre-forward for Greenock Morton and Queen of the South — Peter was able to escape the dangers of the mines through football. Aird first played at the junior level for the Bowhill Rovers in Cardenden.

In 1943, Hibernian manager Willie McCartney first noticed Aird and took him to Edinburgh, where he played for the club from until 1951. He then spent two years at East Fife before he wrapped up his footballing career in Wales.

Aird later worked as a manager for a textile factory in Dundee and also in the dockyard at Rosyth.

Aird died in 2000 and was survived by his wife of 53 years, Marion Gray Aird, and their five children. His ashes were scattered on the pitch at Easter Road, where he and his wife had celebrated their golden anniversary in 1997 with a special floodlit party.
