= John B. Aird (ship) =

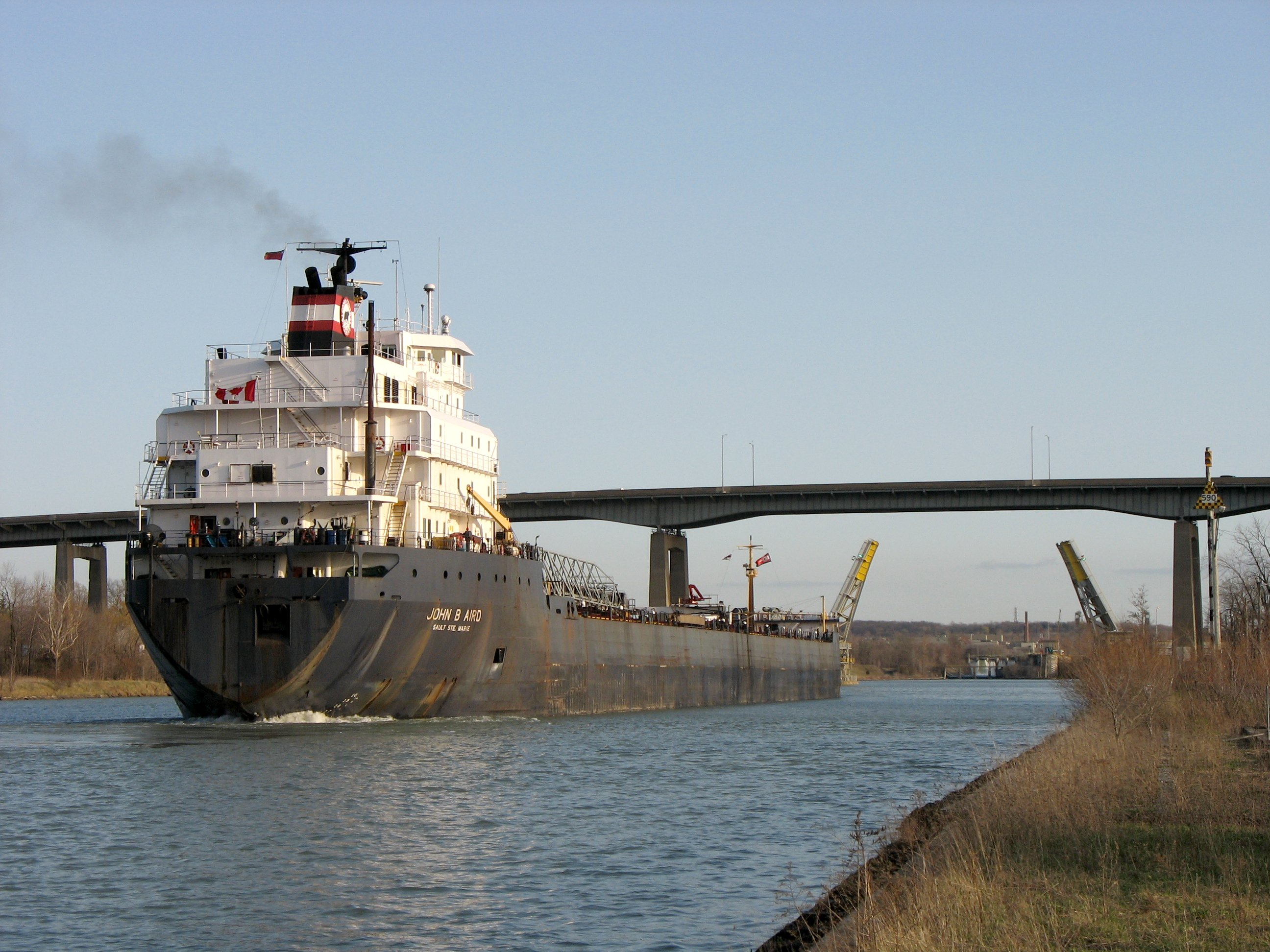
- John B. Aird transitting the Welland Canal

History
- Name: John B. Aird (1983–2017); John B. (2017)
- Owner: Algoma Central
- Operator: Algoma Central
- Port of registry: (Canada) Sault Ste. Marie, Ontario (1983–2017); Freetown, Sierra Leone (2017)
- Builder: Collingwood Shipbuilding, Collingwood, Ontario
- Yard number: 224
- Launched: 18 December 1982
- Completed: June 1983
- In service: 1983
- Out of service: 2016
- Identification: IMO number: 8002432
- Fate: Broken up, 14 June 2017

General characteristics
- Type: Bulk carrier
- Tonnage: 22,881 GT; 30,958 DWT
- Length: 222.5 m (730 ft 0 in) oa; 219 m (718 ft 6 in) pp
- Beam: 23.5 m (77 ft 1 in)
- Installed power: 2 diesel engines, 7,054 kW (9,459 bhp)
- Propulsion: 1 shaft, controllable pitch propeller
- Speed: 12 knots (22 km/h; 14 mph)

John B. Aird was a self-discharging lake freighter/bulk carrier that was launched in 1983 and served on the Great Lakes and Saint Lawrence Seaway until 2017. The vessel was owned and operated by Algoma Central during that time, which had named the vessel for a former chairman of the Algoma Central Railway. Prior to the construction of Algoma Equinox in 2013, John B. Aird was the last vessel built for the company.

== Description ==
John B. Aird was 222.5 m (730 ft 0 in) long overall and 219 m (718 ft 6 in) between perpendiculars with a beam of 23.5 m (77 ft 1 in). The vessel had a gross tonnage (GT) of 22,881 and a deadweight tonnage of 30,958. The ship was powered by two diesel engines driving one shaft with a controllable pitch propeller, rated at 7,054 kilowatts (9,459 bhp). This gave John B. Aird a maximum speed of 12 knots (22 km/h; 14 mph). The ship was built to seawaymax proportions and had a depth of 14.1 m (46 ft 4 in). The ship was equipped with a 79.6 m (261 ft 0 in) deck-mounted boom for unloading its cargo.

== Service history ==
Algoma Central ordered the ship to be constructed at Collingwood Shipbuilding in Collingwood, Ontario, with the yard number 224. The fore part of the ship was built at Port Arthur Shipbuilding in Port Arthur, Ontario. The stern section was launched at Collingwood on 21 October 1982 and towed to Port Arthur. The two parts were joined at Port Arthur and the vessel was launched on 18 December 1982. The ship was named for the then lieutenant governor of Ontario John Black Aird, who was a former chairman of the board of Algoma Central Railway. The bulk carrier was completed in June 1983 and christened by the wife of the lieutenant governor in a private ceremony, after an incident aboard the ship prior to a public ceremony on 3 June 1983. Prior to the construction of Algoma Equinox in 2013, John B. Aird was the last vessel constructed for Algoma Central during an era of expansion by company. The vessel was registered in Sault Ste. Marie, Ontario.

On 31 May 1985, John B. Aird lost power in the Saint Lawrence Seaway and was forced to tie up at the Snell Lock. The vessel often carried coal and suffered $500,000 damage from a coal fire in her self-unloading machinery on 16 October 1990 while at Indiana Harbor, Indiana. The vessel was taken to Sarnia, Ontario, for repairs. The vessel returned to service in November 1990. The vessel was sold for scrap in 2017 and the vessel's name shortened to John B. and re-registered to Freetown, Sierra Leone. The ship arrived at Aliağa, Turkey to be broken up in May and destruction was finished on 14 June 2017.

== Sources ==
- Bawal Jr., Raymond A. (2008). Ships of the St. Clair River. St. Clair, Michigan: Inland Expressions. ISBN 978-0-9818157-1-8.
