= John Black Aird =

Canadian politician (1923–1995)

Captain(N) The Honourable John Black Aird CC OOnt QC

28th Chancellor of the University of Toronto
- In office 1986–1991
- President: George Connell; Robert Prichard
- Preceded by: George Ignatieff
- Succeeded by: Rose Wolfe

23rd Lieutenant Governor of Ontario
- In office September 15, 1980 – September 20, 1985
- Monarch: Elizabeth II
- Governors General: Edward Schreyer; Jeanne Sauvé
- Premier: Bill Davis; Frank Miller; David Peterson
- Preceded by: Pauline Mills McGibbon
- Succeeded by: Lincoln Alexander

Canadian Senator from Ontario
- In office November 10, 1964 – November 28, 1974
- Nominated by: Lester B. Pearson

Personal details
- Born: May 5, 1923 Toronto, Ontario, Canada
- Died: May 6, 1995 (aged 72) Toronto, Ontario, Canada
- Resting place: Mount Pleasant Cemetery, Toronto
- Party: Liberal
- Spouse: Lucille Jane Housser (m. 1944)
- Children: 4
- Relatives: Sir John Aird (grandfather)
- Profession: Politician; lawyer

John Black Aird CC OOnt QC (May 5, 1923 – May 6, 1995) was a Canadian lawyer, corporate director, and political figure. He served in the Senate of Canada from 1964 to 1974, and he was Lieutenant Governor of Ontario from 1980 to 1985.

== Life and career ==
Aird was born in Toronto, Ontario, and was the grandson of Sir John Aird, a prominent Canadian banker. He was educated at Upper Canada College, Trinity College and Osgoode Hall Law School. Aird was a Brother at the Toronto Chapter of Alpha Delta Phi.

During World War II, Aird served in the Royal Canadian Naval Volunteer Reserve. In July 1944, he married Lucille “Jane” Housser.

Aird practised law in Toronto and headed his own firm, Aird & Berlis, in 1974. He also served as a director of several corporations. In 1958, he was appointed to the board of directors of Callaghan Mining. He later was chairman of the board of Algoma Central Railway.

Aird was one of the founding partners of the Canadian law firm Aird & Berlis LLP

From 1964 to 1974, he was a Liberal party Senator. In 1971, he served as chairman of the Canada-United States Permanent Joint Board on Defence. From 1977 to 1985, he was Chancellor of Wilfrid Laurier University in Waterloo.

Aird was appointed an Officer of the Order of Canada in 1976, and he served as 23rd Lieutenant Governor of Ontario from 1980 to 1985. The main focus of his mandate was Ontarians with disabilities. He wrote a book, Loyalty in a Changing World, about the contemporary function of the Lieutenant Governor.

He was lieutenant governor when, 22 days into the 33rd Parliament of Ontario, Premier Frank Miller resigned following his Progressive Conservative government's defeat due to a motion of no confidence. The defeat occurred after an accord had been reached between David Peterson's Liberals and Bob Rae's New Democratic Party to allow Petersen to form a minority government for two years with NDP support, despite the fact that the Liberals had slightly fewer seats than the Tories. Some media outlets, such as the conservative Toronto Sun, compared the matter to the King-Byng Affair and accused Aird of partisanship for asking Peterson to form a government rather than dissolving the legislature and calling a new election.

== Honours ==
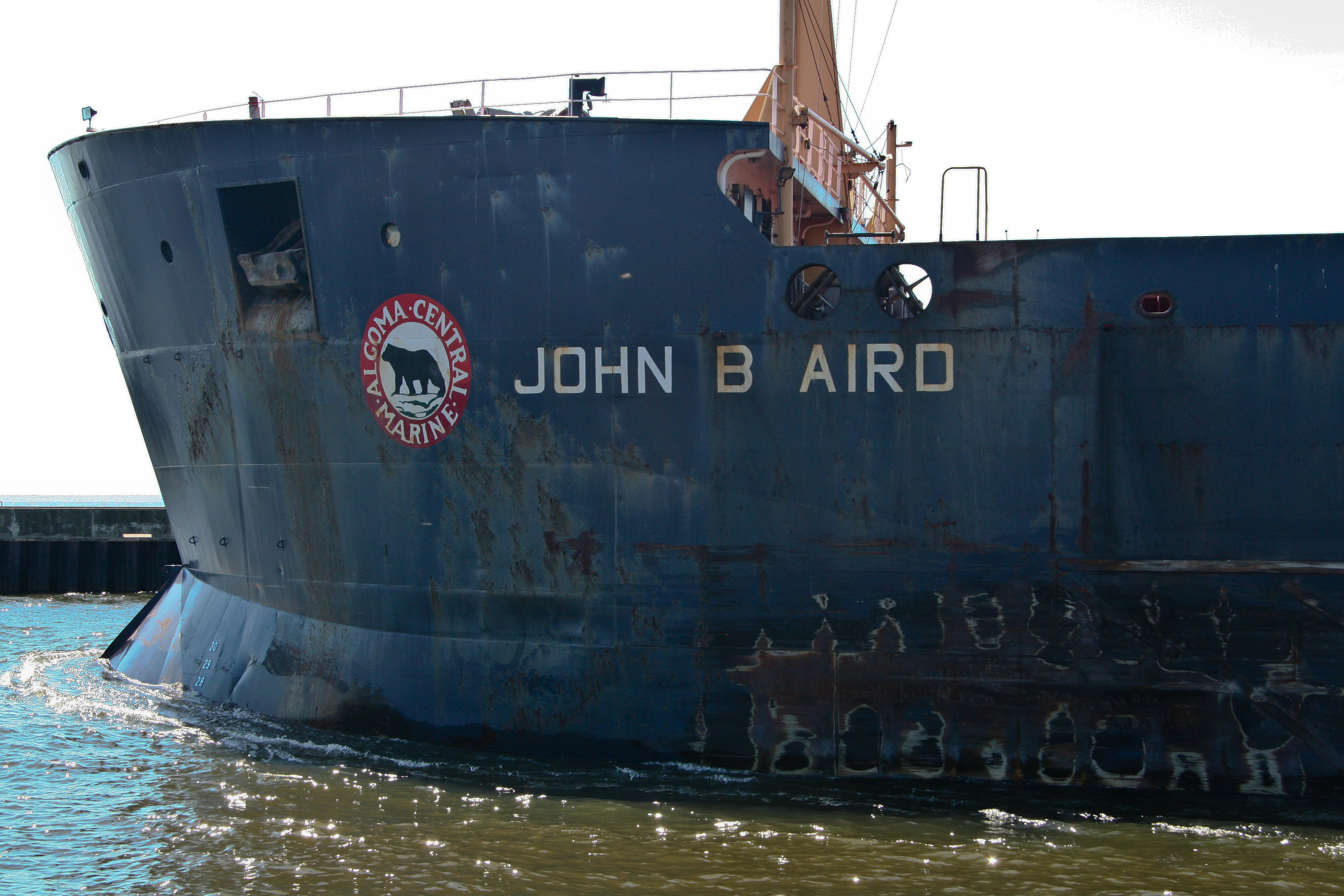
The John B. Aird in 2010

In 1983 Algoma Central launched a ship named the John B. Aird. Aird had previously been chairman of the board of Algoma Central Railway.

After his term as lieutenant governor, Aird became chancellor of the University of Toronto, his alma mater. He was made an Honorary Senior Fellow of Renison University College in 1985. He also served as Governor of the Royal Canadian Geographical Society.

Aird was appointed to the Order of Ontario in 1987, and he was promoted to Companion of the Order of Canada in 1992. He died in Toronto in 1995.

Government offices
Preceded by Pauline Mills McGibbon	Lieutenant Governor of Ontario; 1980–1985	Succeeded by Lincoln Alexander
Academic offices
Preceded by Paul Joseph Martin	Chancellor of Wilfrid Laurier University; 1977–1985	Succeeded by Maureen Forrester
Preceded by George Ignatieff	Chancellor of the University of Toronto; 1986–1991	Succeeded by Rose Wolfe
