= Aird =

Aird may refer to:

== People ==
- Aird (surname), shared by several people

== Places ==
=== Northern Ireland ===
- Aird, County Antrim, a townland

=== Scotland ===
- Aird, Dumfries and Galloway
- Aird, Inverness, a district of the county of Inverness
- Aird, Lewis (Aird An Rubha) in the Outer Hebrides
- Aird Asaig, Harris in the Outer Hebrides
- Aird of Kinloch, Mull in the Inner Hebrides
- Aird of Sleat, Skye in the Inner Hebrides
- An Aird, an area of Fort William, Scotland, and a shinty park
