= Glencraig =

Village in Fife, Scotland

Coordinates: 56.1406°N 3.3197°W

Glencraig is a very small former mining village in Scotland, situated in the Benarty area of Fife, between Crosshill and Lochgelly. The village's population has decreased significantly since the decline of the coal-mining industry during the 1970s and 1980s.

There are two memorial notice boards in the vicinity of the village. One is dedicated to the colliery and the other to the village.

== Notable people ==
- Jock Aird - association footballer
- Peter Aird - association footballer
- Jim Comerford - trade union leader, miner, writer
