= Jock Aird =

Scottish footballer (1926–2021)

Personal information
- Full name: John Rae Aird
- Date of birth: 18 December 1926
- Place of birth: Glencraig, Scotland
- Date of death: 14 June 2021 (aged 94)
- Place of death: Australia
- Position: Defender

Senior career*
Years	Team	Apps	(Gls)
- Jeanfield Swifts
1948–1955	Burnley	132	(0)
1955–1958	Eastern Union		
1959–?	Sydney Hakoah		

International career
1953–1954	Scotland B	2	(0)
1954	Scotland	4	(0)
1958	New Zealand	2	(1)
- * Club domestic league appearances and goals

John Rae Aird (18 December 1926 – 14 June 2021) was a footballer who played for both the Scotland and New Zealand national sides.

== Life and career ==
Born in Glencraig, Fife, Aird started his professional career with Burnley, whom he joined from Perth junior side Jeanfield Swifts in 1948.

A feisty but consistent left-back, he earned international recognition towards the end of his seven-season spell at Turf Moor, making his Scotland debut against Norway in May 1954, at the age of 28. He was then selected in the squad for the upcoming World Cup finals and was one of only 13 players who actually travelled to Switzerland, the SFA opting not to use the full complement of 22 permitted. He played in both matches at the finals as Scotland capitulated in the first round, losing to Austria (1–0) and Uruguay (7–0).

The following year, Aird left Burnley and emigrated to Gisborne in New Zealand. There he played for Eastern Union FC, eventually earning selection for the national side. Aird played two full internationals for New Zealand in the space of a week in 1958, both matches against Australia, with him scoring for New Zealand in a 3–2 defeat in the first game, and then scoring an own goal in a 2–2 draw a week later.

He then moved to Australia in 1959, playing for and latterly coaching Sydney Hakoah.

Aird returned briefly to Gisborne in 1960 from Sydney and played in non-competitive matches for Eastern Union. Unable to get a clearance from FIFA to transfer back to Eastern Union, Aird then took a renewed contract from Sydney Hakoah in January 1961, in which he was offered £15/week as a part-time player, £6/week as coach, further employment opportunities, fares for his family back to Sydney, and a retainer of £5/week in the off-season.

Jock Aird died in June 2021 at the age of 94.

== See also ==
- List of association footballers who have been capped for two senior national teams
