= University of St Andrews Students' Association =

Organisation representing the students of the University of St Andrews, Scotland

- Motto: Your experience, your community, your future
- Institution: University of St Andrews
- Location: St Andrews, Scotland
- Established: 1989 (as St Andrews Students Association)
- CEO: Graeme Kirkpatrick
- Executive officers: President of Union Affairs: Alice Hodges; President of Wellbeing and Community: Alex Chun; President of Education: Emily Bannister; President of Student Opportunities: Robert 'RoMo' Moran; President of Postgraduate Researchers: Callum Robert Forbes Irvine; President of Postgraduate Taught Students: William Evans
- Affiliations: Coalition of Higher Education Students in Scotland
- Colours: Yellow (Representation); Crimson (Activities); Blue (Spaces/Events); Grey (Admin)
- Website: www.yourunion.net

The University of St Andrews Students' Association is the organisation which represents the student body of the University of St Andrews. It was founded in 1885 and comprises the students' representative council and the Student Activities Forum (formerly the Students' Services Council).

Unlike many other students' unions in the UK, it is not a member of the National Union of Students, having rejected membership in March and October 2001, November 2012, and most recently in a referendum in April 2022.

The University of St Andrews also has an Athletic Union.

== History ==
Student representation in St Andrews has a long and storied history, dating back to the formation of the Students' Representative Council (SRC) in the 1880s. The SRC served as the representative arm of the student body, enabling elected students to voice their peers' concerns on important issues. One of the SRC's early contributions to student life was the publication of College Echoes, a popular periodical that featured amusing anecdotes and poems about St Andrews life. Copies of College Echoes still exist today in the university's Special Collections.

=== The formation of the unions ===
By the 1920s, student life expanded to include distinct Men's and Women's Unions, which operated separately from the SRC. While the SRC focused on representation, the Unions were primarily social hubs. They organised activities like weekly dances, known as "Hops," and subsidised meals known as "Dines," which became the precursors to modern traditions like the Friday night Bop and the Scott Lang Dinner.

The Men's Union was originally located at 75 North Street (now the site of the Old Union Coffee Shop), and the Women's Union occupied the adjacent building, which is now the ASC. These Unions served as vital community spaces, especially in an era when social norms often dictated separate spheres for men and women. Notably, the "Old Union Diner," now used for exams and lectures, once served as a dance hall.

=== Unification and modernisation ===
In 1963, the Men's and Women's Unions united, though the SRC continued to function as a distinct entity. A significant transformation occurred in 1973, when both organisations moved into the purpose-built premises on St Mary's Place that remain home to the Students’ Association today.

The final step in the evolution of student governance at St Andrews came in 1989 with the creation of the Students’ Association, which merged the SRC and the Union into a single organisation. This integrated structure was designed to amplify the student voice and streamline activities.

=== The Change Programme ===
In January 2024, in an effort to review operational and strategic practices, better respond to the challenges of the day, and increase relevance to students, the association launched the Change Programme. On 4 December 2024, it was announced that the student body had accepted a referendum to completely alter the hierarchy of the Union. Several of the changes promised by the Change Programme were implemented in the course of the 2024–25 academic year, including the transition to an executive team, with the remainder–like a space-saving review and the transition to forums–to be completed before the end of the programme on 31 August 2025.

=== The students' association today ===
Today, the St Andrews Students’ Association represents students' interests while supporting social and cultural life. From July 2025, the executive officers reflect this heritage: the president of education (PresEd), postgraduate taught and postgraduate research presidents (Pres PGT and Pres PGR) focus on roles representing the SRC's origins, while the president of union affairs (PresAffs), president of wellbeing & community (PresWell), and president of student opportunities (PresOpps) oversee the social and extracurricular dimensions of student life.

== Structure ==
The St Andrews Students' Association is a unified body that combines representation and student activities, ensuring the needs and interests of all students are met. The organisation operates through a clearly defined structure, which includes:

=== Representative bodies ===
The association is rooted in its historical focus on student representation, with the Students’ Representative Council (SRC) as a central pillar. The SRC consists of elected student members who advocate on behalf of their peers to the university and external bodies. It addresses academic, welfare, and societal issues, ensuring student concerns are heard and acted upon.

The SRC Subcommittees further support the representative mission by focusing on specific areas such as equality, diversity, and sustainability.

=== Executive officers ===
The association is led by a team of executive officers, full-time elected representatives who oversee its core functions. Each executive officer has a distinct portfolio, reflecting the broad scope of the organisation:

- Association president: Focuses on overall leadership and represents the student body to senior university officials and external stakeholders.
- Director of education (DoEd): Advocates for academic issues, including teaching quality, assessment, and library services.
- Director of events and services (DoES): Manages social events, including the popular weekly Bops and other major events like Freshers' Week.
- Director of student development and activities (DoSDA): Oversees the activities of student societies and supports personal development opportunities.
- Director of wellbeing (DoWell): Supports initiatives related to student health, welfare, and inclusion.
- Postgraduate research president: Represents and leads the PGR Rep system.
- Postgraduate taught president: Represents and leads the PGT Rep system.

These officers work closely with staff and students to implement policies and deliver services effectively.

As of 21st July 2025, the executive team will take a new form:

- President of union affairs (PresAffs): Focuses on overall leadership and represents the student body to senior university officials and external stakeholders.
- President of education (PresEd): Advocates for academic issues, including teaching quality, assessment, and library services.
- President of student opportunities (PresOpps): Oversees the activities of student societies and other groups and supports personal development opportunities.
- President of wellbeing & community (PresWell): Supports initiatives related to student health, welfare, and inclusion.
- Postgraduate research president (PGR Pres): Represents and leads the PGR Rep system.
- Postgraduate taught president (PGT Pres): Represents and leads the PGT Rep system.

=== Activities subcommittees and groups ===
The association operates a range of subcommittees and groups that allow students to get involved in specific aspects of university life. Some of these include:

- Societies Committee: Supports and regulates the wide variety of student societies.
- Charities Campaign: Coordinates student fundraising efforts.
- Mermaids: The student performing arts fund, supporting theatre, music, and creative projects.
- Volunteering Committee: Organises volunteer opportunities within the local community and beyond.

=== Management and the board ===
The students’ association operates under the strategic guidance of a board of trustees, ensuring that the organisation remains financially sustainable and adheres to its constitutional aims. The board is composed of:

- Student trustees: Elected students who bring the perspective of the wider student body.
- External trustees: Appointed professionals who provide expertise in areas such as finance, governance, and organisational strategy.
- University-appointed trustees: Individuals appointed by the University of St Andrews to ensure alignment with university values.
- Exec officer trustees: Current sabbatical officers who ensure alignment between the Board and the day-to-day work of the association.

The board meets regularly to review strategic priorities, approve budgets, and oversee compliance with legal and regulatory requirements.

Operationally, the association is supported by a team of dedicated staff members who manage its day-to-day activities, ranging from event planning to administrative support. Staff members work closely with the sabbatical officers to ensure the smooth delivery of services and initiatives.

=== Facilities and Operations ===
The association also manages a range of facilities that cater to students' social and academic needs. These include:

The Students’ Union building on St Mary's Place, which houses: Bars and cafes: Including Sandy's Bar and the Rector's Cafe. Event spaces: Used for club meetings, performances, and large-scale events like balls and bops. Study areas: Quiet zones for academic work and group projects. Additionally, the association runs services like event ticketing, room bookings, and student-focused initiatives.

=== Membership and participation ===
All matriculated students at St Andrews are automatically members of the Students' Association, giving them voting rights in elections, the ability to run for positions, and access to the facilities and activities. The association fosters a strong participatory culture, encouraging students to take an active role in shaping their university experience.

== Building ==
The Students' Association Building (informally known as the Union) is located on St Mary's Place, St Andrews. Union facilities include several bars and the university's Student Support Services. In 2013 the Students' Association Building underwent a refurbishment. In early 2023, it was discovered that the building had been built with RAAC, a material that is no longer considered suitable for construction, and the Club 601 was closed for an 18-month renovation period in which the roof was completely redone. The club and StAge officially reopened on 30 August 2024, ahead of the 2024/25 academic year.

== Student representative council ==
The student representative council was instituted as the legal representative body for students of the university by the Universities (Scotland) Act 1889.

The SRC is responsible for representing students' interests to the management of the university and to local and national government.

Through the Democracy Review, a part of the Change Programme, the SRC will be completely reworked with three main forums feeding into one large SRC meeting for the entire student population. This meeting will be held once per term instead of once per month.

The SRC comprises a number of officers, who chair the respective subcommittees, and members:

Executive officers

- President of the students' association
- Director of wellbeing and equality
- Director of education
- Director of student development and activities
- Director of events and services
- Postgraduate research president
- Postgraduate taught president

Officers of the students' association

- Accommodation officer
- Alumni officer
- Arts & Divinity Faculty president
- Association chair
- BAME officer
- Carers, commuters, mature & flexible learners officer
- Charities officer
- Community relations officer
- Disability officer
- Employability officer
- Environment officer
- Gender equality officer
- International students' officer
- LGBT+ officer
- Societies officer
- Music officer
- Performing arts officer
- Science & Medicine Faculty president
- Societies officer
- Student health officer
- Widening access & participation officer
Other members
- Athletic Union president
- Rector's assessor - during the controversy surrounding the Rector and the University, this role was unfilled. Following her reinstatement as the president of University Court, the University has given permission for the Rector to begin the recruitment process.

== Barron Theatre closure ==
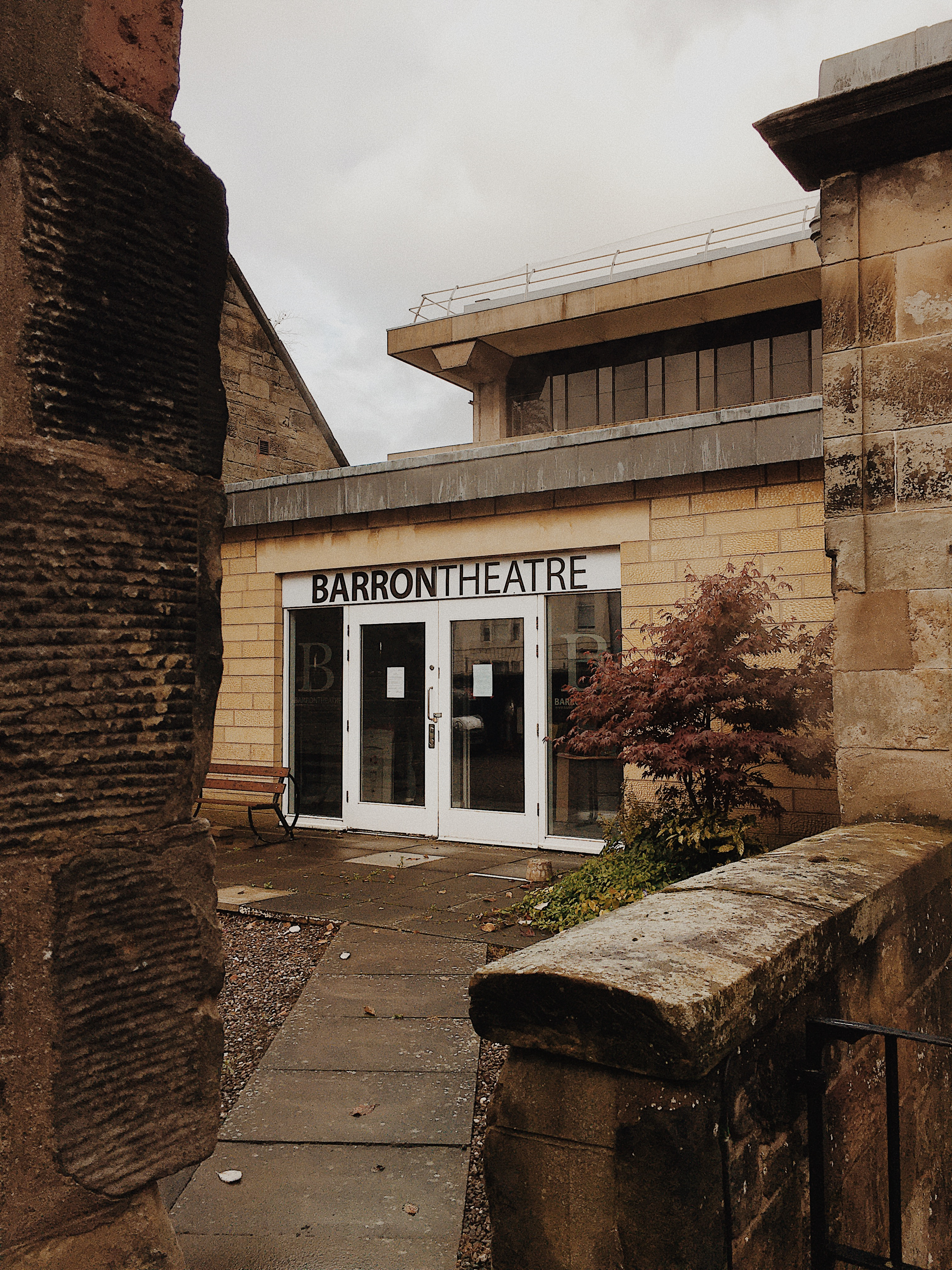
Entrance to the Barron Theatre

The Barron Theatre was a 55-seat black box theatre on the university campus. It was one of only three entirely student-run theatres in the UK. It was operated by the Mermaids Performing Arts Fund, a subcommittee of the Students' Association, notable alumni of which includes Deidre Mullins and Siobhan Redmond. In January 2020 it was announced that the theatre would be closed, despite major pushback from the student body. A campaign was launched called Save the Barron that garnered support from the student body and 2,800 signatures, but the decision for the student-run venue to close was not reversed.

As a replacement for the Barron Theatre, the university granted Mermaids a residency in the Lawrence Levy Studio Theatre in the now University-operated Byre Theatre. The residency is now colloquially known as the Barron at the Byre and hosts many of Mermaids' student-written and experimental performances throughout the year, alongside the Union StAge, the McPherson Recital Room at the Laidlaw Music Centre and the larger A.B. Paterson Auditorium in the Byre Theatre.
