= University of St Andrews Athletic Union =

- Motto: Ancient Greek: ΑΙΕΝ ΑΡΙΣΤΕΥΕΙΝ (AIEN ARISTEUEIN)
- Type: Athletic Union
- Established: 1901
- Affiliations: British Universities and Colleges Sport Scottish Student Sport
- President: Olivia King (24/25)
- Location: St Andrews, Fife, Scotland, UK
- Website: sport.wp.st-andrews.ac.uk

The University of St Andrews Athletic Union (commonly known as the ‘AU’) is the umbrella organisation for the support and development of sport and sports clubs at the University of St Andrews. Run by students, for students, it provides structure and advice to over 50 clubs and several thousand members.

== Organisation ==
The Athletic Union is a student representative body with its own constitution sanctioned by the University Court. The Athletic Union is run by an Executive Committee elected by the student body of the University of St Andrews. The current Athletic Union President is Ailsa Martin.

== Affiliated Clubs ==
There are over 50 clubs affiliated to the Athletic Union.

=== List of Clubs ===
- Aikido
- Archery
- Athletics & Cross Country
- Badminton
- Basketball
- Boat Club (Rowing)
- Boxing
- Canoe & Kayak
- Cheerleading
- Clay Pigeon
- Cricket
- Dance
- Fencing
- Football
- Futsal
- Golf
- Handball
- Hockey
- Ice Hockey
- Ice Skating
- Judo
- Jujitsu
- Karate
- Kendo
- Korfball
- Lacrosse
- Mixed Martial Arts (MMA)
- Mountaineering & Mountain Biking
- Netball
- Pole Dancing
- Polo
- Olympic Weightlifting
- Riding
- Rifle
- Rugby
- Sailing
- Shinty
- Snowsports
- Squash
- Sub Aqua
- Surfing
- Swimming
- Table Tennis
- Taekwondo
- Tennis
- Trampoline & Gymnastics
- Triathlon & Road Cycling
- Ultimate
- Volleyball
- Water Polo
- Windsurfing

== National Affiliations ==
=== British University & College Sport (BUCS) ===
The University of St Andrews Athletic Union affiliates to BUCS annually. BUCS is responsible for the organisation of the majority of university sport and claims to set more sports fixtures than any other sports organisation in Europe. Every sport that is recognised by BUCS is allocated points towards it. These are compiled and at the end of the season all institutions are ranked for sport.

=== Scottish Student Sports (SSS) ===
The University of St Andrews Athletic Union affiliates to SSS annually. SSS runs a lot of the sports events and fixtures on behalf of BUCS in Scotland, in particular the British University Games (BUGS). SSS also takes responsibility for a lot of the sports BUCS does not recognise such as rifle, shinty and curling.
