= Crosshill, Fife =

Village in Fife, Scotland

Coordinates: 56.15112°N 3.32268°W

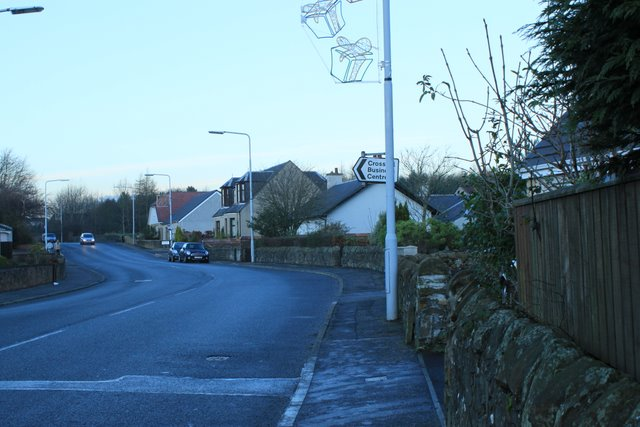
Main street Crosshill opposite the Brag centre

Crosshill is a village in Fife, Scotland, situated just south of Lochore and east of Loch Ore.

== History ==
Crosshill was the site of a murder committed by one of Scotland's youngest offenders. Nicolle Early, aged 16 at the time, killed Ann Gray in her Crosshill home on 14 November 2008.

== Notable residents ==
- Richard Jobson

== Sport ==
Crosshill is home to the football club Lochore Welfare, who compete in the East of Scotland League First Division.
