= Loch Ore =

- Scottish Gaelic: Loch Oir; Loch Odhar
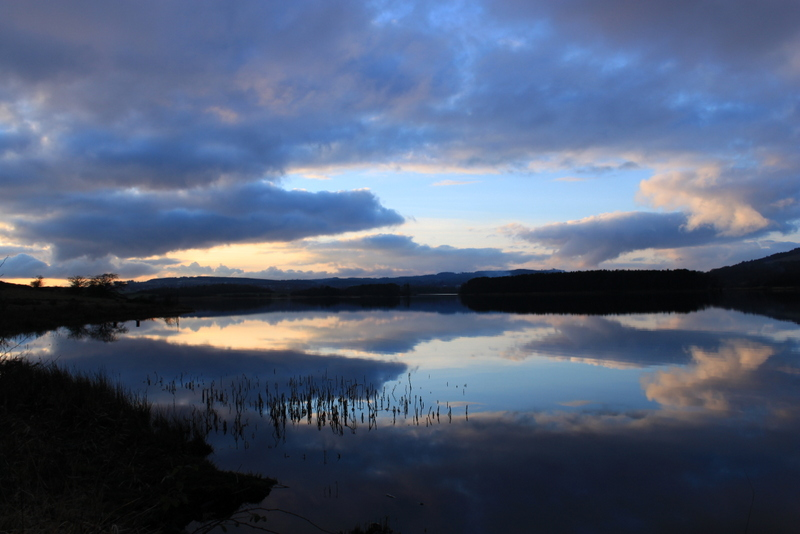

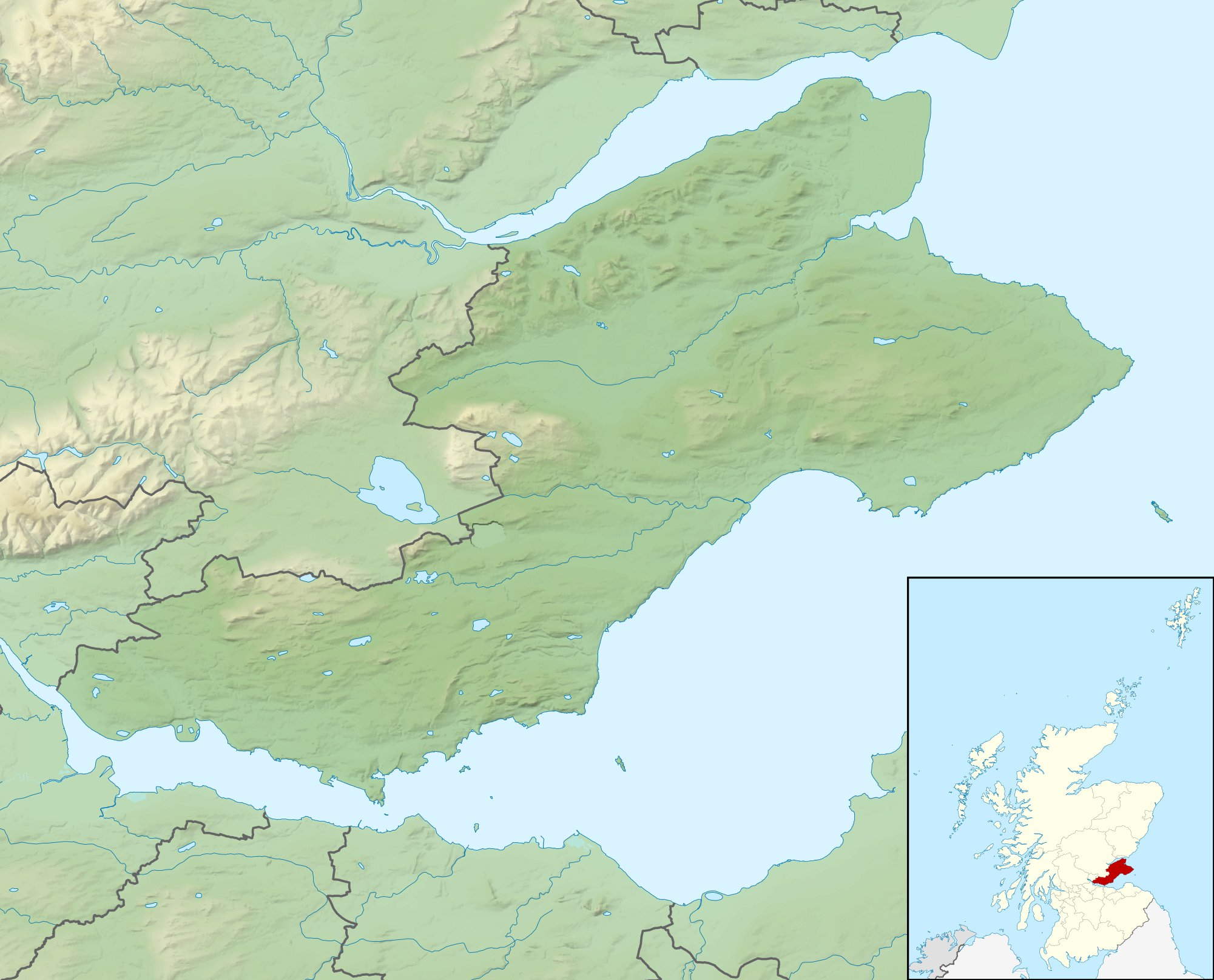
- Location within Fife
- Location: Fife, Scotland
- Coordinates: 56.1458°N 3.3478°W
- Type: freshwater loch
- Primary outflows: River Ore
- Surface area: 260 acres (110 ha)

Loch Ore (Scottish Gaelic: Loch Oir) is a loch situated in Fife, Scotland. It forms the core of Lochore Meadows Country Park. It is used mainly for leisure purposes, especially yachting, although the uneven depth can make speed boating problematic.

The name is originally Pictish, as most rivers in the east of Scotland are, so it predates the arrival of Gaelic in Fife. However, the name has been interpreted by modern Gaelic speakers as Loch Odhar meaning "the dull loch".

The Roman General Agricola held winter quarters in A.D.83 on the edge of Loch Ore, soon after his invasion of Britain and before proceeding to meet Calgacus at the battle of Mons Graupius. The original loch was drained in the 1790s when the landowner, Captain Park, attempted to improve the estate and extend cultivation. The project was not a success and the land formerly occupied by the loch remained boggy and difficult to exploit commercially. The loch gradually returned in the mid 20th century, during the period when Lochore Meadows was a coal mine, and the mineral railway serving the pithead became an embankment surrounded by water. The return of the loch was due to subsidence caused by mining, and the 'new' loch occupies a different site from the original one. The loch is now stabilised but its depth still fluctuates. The islands in the loch are the remains of the former railway embankment.

The loch is the training site of many sports teams, including the University of St Andrews Boat Club. The loch holds many events, such as the annual Scottish Open Water Championships where the swimmers compete in a 5 km, 2 km and 4×1 km relay swim, and Saints Regatta in September, run by the students of the University of St Andrews Boat Club.

== See also ==
- List of lochs in Scotland
