= 2020–21 East of Scotland Football League =

East of Scotland Football League
- Season: 2020–21
- Dates: 9 October 2020 – 11 April 2021 (abandoned)

The 2020–21 East of Scotland Football League (known as the Central Taxis East of Scotland League for sponsorship reasons) was the 92nd season of the East of Scotland Football League, and the 7th season as the sixth tier of the Scottish football pyramid system. Bo'ness United were the reigning champions but could not defend their title after being promoted to the Lowland Football League.

The start of the league season was delayed until October 2020 because of the COVID-19 pandemic, and games were played behind closed doors due to Scottish Government restrictions.

On 11 January 2021 the league was suspended by the Scottish Football Association due to the escalating pandemic situation. On 11 April clubs voted to declared the season null and void.

== Teams ==
The following teams changed division after the 2019–20 season.

=== To East of Scotland Football League ===
Returned from Abeyance

- Eyemouth United

Transferred from East Superleague North

- Luncarty

Transferred from East Superleague South

- Kennoway Star Hearts
- Lochore Welfare
- Thornton Hibs

Transferred from East Premier League South

- Kirkcaldy & Dysart
- Lochgelly Albert
- Newburgh
- Rosyth

Transferred from Lothian and Edinburgh Amateur Football League

- Edinburgh South

=== From East of Scotland Football League ===
Promoted to Lowland Football League

- Bo'ness United

== Premier Division ==
East of Scotland Football League Premier Division
- Season: 2020–21
- Dates: 9 October 2020 – 11 April 2021 (abandoned)
- Matches: 95
- Goals: 379 (3.99 per match)
- Biggest home win: Camelon Juniors 8–0 Tynecastle (19 December 2020)
- Biggest away win: Blackburn United 0–6 Jeanfield Swifts (10 October 2020)
- Highest scoring: Jeanfield Swifts 6–3 Whitehill Welfare (17 October 2020); Broxburn Athletic 4–5 Crossgates Primrose (5 December 2020)
- Longest winning run: 7 matches: Tranent Juniors
- Longest unbeaten run: 12 matches: Tranent Juniors
- Longest winless run: 10 matches: Whitehill Welfare
- Longest losing run: 9 matches: Whitehill Welfare
- All statistics correct as of 29 December 2020.

Location of teams in 2020–21 East of Scotland Football League Premier Division

=== Teams ===
No clubs were relegated at the end of the 2019–20 season. Therefore all clubs remain in the Premier Division (except promoted Bo'ness United) along with the winners of First Division Conference A and B (Lothian Thistle Hutchison Vale and Tynecastle), plus the runners-up with the best points per game record (Inverkeithing Hillfield Swifts).

=== Stadia and locations ===
Team	Location	Home ground	Capacity	Seats	Floodlit
Blackburn United ^{[SFA]}	Blackburn	New Murrayfield Park	1,500	0	Yes
Broxburn Athletic ^{[SFA]}	Broxburn	Albyn Park	1,000	0	Yes
Camelon Juniors ^{[SFA]}	Camelon	Carmuirs Park	2,000	0	Yes
Crossgates Primrose	Crossgates	Humbug Park	2,000	0	No
Dunbar United	Dunbar	New Countess Park	2,500	0	Yes
Dundonald Bluebell ^{[SFA]}	Cardenden	Moorside Park	2,000	0	Yes
Hill of Beath Hawthorn ^{[SFA]}	Hill of Beath	Keir's Park	2,000	0	Yes
Inverkeithing Hillfield Swifts	Inverkeithing	Ballast Bank	1,000	0	No
Jeanfield Swifts ^{[SFA]}	Perth	Riverside Stadium	1,000	0	Yes
Linlithgow Rose ^{[SFA]}	Linlithgow	Prestonfield	2,264	301	Yes
Lothian Thistle Hutchison Vale ^{[SFA]}	Edinburgh	Saughton Sports Complex	1,000	0	Yes
Musselburgh Athletic	Musselburgh	Olivebank Stadium	2,500	0	Yes
Newtongrange Star ^{[SFA]}	Newtongrange	New Victoria Park	2,300	30	Yes
Penicuik Athletic ^{[SFA]}	Penicuik	Penicuik Park	2,000	0	Yes
Sauchie Juniors	Sauchie	Beechwood Park	5,000	200	Yes
Tranent Juniors ^{[SFA]}	Tranent	Foresters Park	2,300	44	Yes
Tynecastle ^{[SFA]}	Edinburgh	Meggetland Sports Complex	4,388	500	Yes
Whitehill Welfare ^{[SFA]}	Rosewell	Ferguson Park	2,614	192	Yes

=== League table ===
Pos	Team	Pld	W	D	L	GF	GA	GD	Pts
1	Tranent Juniors	12	8	4	0	36	15	+21	28
2	Jeanfield Swifts	9	7	2	0	27	7	+20	23
3	Linlithgow Rose	11	6	4	1	23	13	+10	22
4	Musselburgh Athletic	11	7	1	3	32	25	+7	22
5	Camelon Juniors	10	6	2	2	33	13	+20	20
6	Lothian Thistle Hutchison Vale	10	6	1	3	22	20	+2	19
7	Penicuik Athletic	8	5	1	2	20	10	+10	16
8	Dundonald Bluebell	8	5	1	2	13	9	+4	16
9	Newtongrange Star	12	5	1	6	24	22	+2	16
10	Broxburn Athletic	11	5	1	5	25	24	+1	16
11	Sauchie Juniors	11	4	3	4	23	18	+5	15
12	Hill of Beath Hawthorn	10	5	0	5	16	18	−2	15
13	Tynecastle	11	4	2	5	25	25	0	14
14	Dunbar United	13	3	2	8	12	30	−18	11
15	Crossgates Primrose	11	2	4	5	15	25	−10	10
16	Blackburn United	12	1	0	11	15	39	−24	3
17	Inverkeithing Hillfield Swifts	10	1	0	9	8	34	−26	3
18	Whitehill Welfare	10	0	1	9	10	32	−22	1

Source: East of Scotland Football League
Rules for classification: 1) Points; 2) Goal difference; 3) Number of goals scored

=== Results ===
Home \ Away	BLU	BRX	CML	CRS	DNB	DBL	HOB	IHS	JFS	LIN	LTV	MUS	NGS	PEN	SAU	TRA	TYN	WHI
Blackburn United	—			0–1		1–2			0–6	2–3	1–4	2–4						
Broxburn Athletic	4–2	—	2–0	4–5									3–0				0–3	3–1
Camelon Juniors			—		6–0			6–2				1–2		1–0			8–0	
Crossgates Primrose			1–4	—		0–0					0–3				1–2	2–3		
Dunbar United		1–4			—					0–3	5–0				2–0	1–1		1–1
Dundonald Bluebell						—	3–2				0–2							
Hill of Beath Hawthorn	2–1				3–0		—	0–4	0–3						2–1		4–2	2–0
Inverkeithing Hillfield Swifts					0–1			—	1–3				0–2	0–3		1–5		
Jeanfield Swifts		3–1		1–1	3–0				—									6–3
Linlithgow Rose				1–1				3–0	0–0	—	2–3		2–1				2–0	
Lothian Thistle Hutchison Vale		3–3					2–0				—				1–3			
Musselburgh Athletic	4–2				3–1					3–3	2–3	—	2–5			5–3		
Newtongrange Star			1–1		2–0	1–5			1–2			1–2	—	3–2		2–3		5–0
Penicuik Athletic		4–1		4–0								3–2		—		2–2	2–1	
Sauchie Juniors	1–2	2–0	4–4			1–2		5–0		1–1					—			
Tranent Juniors	3–1				4–0		2–1				4–1				3–3	—		6–1
Tynecastle	5–1			3–3		2–0		6–0								0–0	—	
Whitehill Welfare			1–2			0–1				2–3		1–3						—

Source: https://www.eosfl.com/item.php?pg=resultgrid&pd=1058&it=226
Legend: Blue = home team win; Yellow = draw; Red = away team win.

== First Division ==
The 31 First Division clubs were assigned a place in Conference A or B based on their performances in the 2019–20 season.

=== Conference A ===
Location of teams in 2020–21 East of Scotland Football League First Division Conference A

==== Stadia and locations ====
Team	Location	Home ground	Capacity	Seats	Floodlit
Arniston Rangers	Gorebridge	Newbyres Park	3,000	0	No
Coldstream ^{[SFA]}	Coldstream	Home Park	1,000	0	Yes
Craigroyston	Edinburgh	St Mark's Park	2,000	0	No
Dalkeith Thistle	Dalkeith	King's Park	2,000	0	Yes
Dunipace ^{[SFA]}	Denny	Westfield Park	2,000	0	Yes
Edinburgh South	Dalkeith	King's Park (Note: Edinburgh South are ground-sharing with Dalkeith Thistle.)	2,000	0	Yes
Edinburgh United	Edinburgh	Paties Road Stadium	2,500	200	No
Haddington Athletic ^{[SFA]}	Haddington	Millfield Park	1,500	0	Yes
Kennoway Star Hearts	Star	Treaton Park	1,000	0	Yes
Kirkcaldy & Dysart	Kirkcaldy	Denfield Park	1,200	0	No
Leith Athletic	Edinburgh	Peffermill 3G	500	0	Yes
Ormiston	Ormiston	New Recreation Park	1,000	0	No
Rosyth	Rosyth	Fleet Grounds	300	0	Yes
St Andrews United	St Andrews	Recreation Park	2,000	0	No
Thornton Hibs	Thornton	Memorial Park	1,800	0	No
Tweedmouth Rangers	Berwick-upon-Tweed	Old Shielfield	1,000	0	No

==== League table ====
Pos	Team	Pld	W	D	L	GF	GA	GD	Pts
1	Leith Athletic	9	9	0	0	40	9	+31	27
2	Haddington Athletic	10	8	2	0	29	7	+22	26
3	Edinburgh United	10	6	1	3	22	12	+10	19
4	Kennoway Star Hearts	8	6	0	2	22	7	+15	18
5	Edinburgh South	10	6	0	4	21	18	+3	18
6	Rosyth	11	5	1	5	33	25	+8	16
7	Thornton Hibs	9	5	1	3	23	16	+7	16
8	Craigroyston	9	4	2	3	19	15	+4	14
9	Dunipace	9	4	1	4	26	12	+14	13
10	Coldstream	8	4	0	4	17	21	−4	12
11	Dalkeith Thistle	12	3	1	8	16	24	−8	10
12	St Andrews United	9	3	1	5	12	25	−13	10
13	Arniston Rangers	9	2	1	6	10	27	−17	7
14	Kirkcaldy & Dysart	10	2	1	7	10	32	−22	7
15	Ormiston	8	1	0	7	3	22	−19	3
16	Tweedmouth Rangers	7	0	0	7	4	35	−31	0

Source: East of Scotland Football League
Rules for classification: 1) Points; 2) Goal difference; 3) Number of goals scored

=== Conference B ===
Location of teams in 2020–21 East of Scotland Football League First Division Conference B

==== Stadia and locations ====
Team	Location	Home ground	Capacity	Seats	Floodlit
Burntisland Shipyard ^{[SFA]}	Burntisland	Recreation Park	1,000	0	No
Easthouses Lily MW ^{[SFA]}	Easthouses	Newbattle Complex	1,500	100	Yes
Eyemouth United	Eyemouth	Warner Park	500	0	No
Glenrothes	Glenrothes	Warout Stadium	5,000	730	No
Hawick Royal Albert United ^{[SFA]}	Hawick	Albert Park	1,000	500	Yes
Heriot-Watt University	Edinburgh	Riccarton Campus	200	0	Yes
Kinnoull	Perth	Tulloch Park	1,200	0	Yes
Lochgelly Albert	Lochgelly	Gardiners Park	3,200	0	No
Lochore Welfare	Crosshill	Central Park	1,300	0	No
Luncarty	Luncarty	Brownlands Park	1,200	0	No
Newburgh	Newburgh	East Shore Park	1,000	0	No
Oakley United	Oakley	Blairwood Park	2,000	0	No
Peebles Rovers	Peebles	Whitestone Park	2,250	250	No
Preston Athletic ^{[SFA]}	Prestonpans	Pennypit Park	1,500	313	Yes
Stirling University Reserves	Stirling	Gannochy Sports Centre	1,000	0	Yes

==== League table ====
Pos	Team	Pld	W	D	L	GF	GA	GD	Pts
1	Heriot-Watt University	11	8	0	3	34	14	+20	24
2	Luncarty	7	6	0	1	23	5	+18	18
3	Oakley United	8	5	2	1	20	9	+11	17
4	Kinnoull	8	5	1	2	25	10	+15	16
5	Burntisland Shipyard	8	5	1	2	25	14	+11	16
6	Newburgh	9	5	0	4	26	22	+4	15
7	Stirling University reserves	10	4	3	3	20	20	0	15
8	Glenrothes (Note: Glenrothes were awarded 3 points and Hawick Royal Albert United deducted 3 points after Hawick RAU fielded ineligible players in their match on 10 October 2020.)	8	3	2	3	17	13	+4	14
9	Easthouses Lily Miners Welfare	8	3	2	3	22	15	+7	11
10	Peebles Rovers	8	3	2	3	22	21	+1	11
11	Preston Athletic	8	1	3	4	10	14	−4	6
12	Lochore Welfare	8	1	3	4	13	18	−5	6
13	Lochgelly Albert	8	1	2	5	10	24	−14	5
14	Hawick Royal Albert United	8	1	3	4	17	26	−9	3
15	Eyemouth United	9	0	0	9	5	64	−59	0

Source: East of Scotland Football League
Rules for classification: 1) Points; 2) Goal difference; 3) Number of goals scored

== Notes ==
^{SFA} Club with an SFA Licence eligible to participate in the Lowland League promotion play-off should they win the Premier Division.
