= 2018–19 East of Scotland Football League =

East of Scotland Football League
- Season: 2018–19
- Dates: 11 August 2018 – 18 May 2019
- Champions: Bonnyrigg Rose Athletic
- Promoted: Bonnyrigg Rose Athletic
- Matches: 472
- Goals: 2,187 (4.63 per match)
- Top goalscorer: Tommy Coyne (42 goals); Linlithgow Rose
- Biggest home win: Hill of Beath Hawthorn 16–0 Tweedmouth Rangers (25 August 2018)
- Biggest away win: Inverkeithing Hillfield Swifts 0–10 Linlithgow Rose (15 August 2018); Ormiston 1–11 Linlithgow Rose (29 September 2018); Eyemouth United 1–11 Haddington Athletic (6 April 2019)
- Highest scoring: Hill of Beath Hawthorn 16–0 Tweedmouth Rangers (25 August 2018); Bo'ness United 15–1 Eyemouth United (16 February 2019)
- Highest attendance: 1,012; Bonnyrigg Rose Athletic 2–1 Penicuik Athletic (1 May 2019)
- All statistics correct as of 18 May 2019.

The 2018–19 East of Scotland Football League (known as the Central Taxis East of Scotland League for sponsorship reasons) was the 90th season of the East of Scotland Football League, and the 5th season as the sixth tier of the Scottish football pyramid system. The season began on 11 August 2018 and ended on 18 May 2019. Kelty Hearts were the reigning champions but could not defend their title after being promoted to the Lowland Football League.

The league saw an increase from 13 to 39 teams and was split into three parallel conferences, each containing 13 teams. The additional teams consisted of 24 clubs who applied to switch from the SJFA East Region, one from the SJFA West Region, one new team and Hawick Royal Albert who were relegated from the Lowland League.

The winners of each conference took part in a round-robin competition at the end of the season, with Bonnyrigg Rose Athletic being crowned league champions on 4 May 2019 after winning both their championship play-off matches. They later clinched promotion to the Lowland League after gaining their SFA licence on 14 June 2019.

The top five clubs in each conference, and best 6th-placed, formed the new 16-team Premier Division for the 2019–20 season.

== Teams ==
The following teams changed division after the 2017–18 season.

=== To East of Scotland Football League ===
Relegated from Lowland Football League

- Hawick Royal Albert

Transferred from East Superleague

- Bo'ness United
- Bonnyrigg Rose Athletic
- Broxburn Athletic
- Camelon Juniors
- Dundonald Bluebell
- Hill of Beath Hawthorn
- Jeanfield Swifts
- Linlithgow Rose
- Newtongrange Star
- Penicuik Athletic
- Sauchie Juniors

Transferred from East Premier League

- Arniston Rangers
- Blackburn United
- Dalkeith Thistle
- Dunbar United
- Haddington Athletic
- Musselburgh Athletic
- St Andrews United
- Tranent Juniors

Transferred from East South Division

- Craigroyston
- Crossgates Primrose
- Easthouses Lily MW
- Edinburgh United
- Oakley United

Transferred from West Central District Second Division

- Dunipace

Inverkeithing Hillfield Swifts also joined having previously played in the Fife Amateur Football League.

=== From East of Scotland Football League ===
Promoted to Lowland League

- Kelty Hearts

== Conference A ==
Conference A
- Season: 2018–19
- Dates: 14 August 2018 – 27 April 2019
- Champions: Penicuik Athletic
- Matches: 156
- Goals: 693 (4.44 per match)
- Top goalscorer: Wayne McIntosh (30 goals); Penicuik Athletic
- Biggest home win: Hill of Beath Hawthorn 16–0 Tweedmouth Rangers (25 August 2018)
- Biggest away win: Tweedmouth Rangers 0–8 Dunbar United (15 August 2018); Hawick Royal Albert 1–9 Newtongrange Star (25 August 2018)
- Highest scoring: Hill of Beath Hawthorn 16–0 Tweedmouth Rangers (25 August 2018)
- Longest winning run: 11 matches: Penicuik Athletic
- Longest winless run: 20 matches: Tweedmouth Rangers
- Longest losing run: 14 matches: Tweedmouth Rangers
- Highest attendance: 495; Penicuik Athletic 1–1 Musselburgh Athletic (20 April 2019)
- All statistics correct as of 27 April 2019.

=== Teams and locations ===
Location of teams in 2018–19 East of Scotland Football League Conference A

Team	Location	Home ground	Capacity	Seats	Floodlit
Arniston Rangers	Gorebridge	Newbyres Park	3,000	0	No
Coldstream ^{[SFA]}	Coldstream	Home Park	1,000	0	No
Dunbar United	Dunbar	New Countess Park	2,500	0	Yes
Easthouses Lily MW	Easthouses	Newbattle Complex	1,500	100	Yes
Hawick Royal Albert ^{[SFA]}	Hawick	Albert Park	1,000	500	Yes
Hill of Beath Hawthorn	Hill of Beath	Keirs Park	2,000	0	Yes
Leith Athletic	Edinburgh	Peffermill 3G	500	0	Yes
Musselburgh Athletic	Musselburgh	Olivebank Stadium	2,500	0	No
Newtongrange Star	Newtongrange	New Victoria Park	2,300	30	Yes
Oakley United	Oakley	Blairwood Park	2,000	0	No
Peebles Rovers	Peebles	Whitestone Park	1,250	250	No
Penicuik Athletic	Penicuik	Penicuik Park	2,000	0	Yes
Tweedmouth Rangers	Berwick-upon-Tweed	Old Shielfield	1,000	0	No

=== League table ===
Pos	Team	Pld	W	D	L	GF	GA	GD	Pts	Qualification
1	Penicuik Athletic (Q)	24	20	3	1	92	15	+77	63	Qualification for the Championship play-off
2	Hill of Beath Hawthorn (Q)	24	20	2	2	99	17	+82	62	Qualification for the Premier Division
3	Musselburgh Athletic (Q)	24	17	3	4	74	31	+43	54	Qualification for the Premier Division
4	Newtongrange Star (Q)	24	14	5	5	79	32	+47	47	Qualification for the Premier Division
5	Dunbar United (Q)	24	13	4	7	62	34	+28	43	Qualification for the Premier Division
6	Leith Athletic	24	10	4	10	41	51	−10	34	
7	Coldstream (Note: Coldstream deducted three points for fielding an ineligible player.)	24	10	3	11	56	51	+5	30	
8	Easthouses Lily Miners Welfare	24	9	1	14	41	67	−26	28	
9	Oakley United	24	6	5	13	34	50	−16	23	
10	Arniston Rangers	24	7	2	15	34	71	−37	23	
11	Peebles Rovers	24	6	4	14	40	73	−33	22	
12	Hawick Royal Albert	24	4	1	19	21	86	−65	13	
13	Tweedmouth Rangers	24	1	1	22	20	115	−95	4	

Source: East of Scotland Football League
Rules for classification: 1) Points; 2) Goal difference; 3) Number of goals scored
(Q) Qualified for the phase indicated

=== Results ===
Home \ Away	ARN	COL	DNB	EAS	HRA	HOB	LEI	MUS	NEW	OAK	PEE	PEN	TWE
Arniston Rangers		3–0	1–1	2–3	2–0	0–7	2–1	2–3	1–8	0–2	3–0	0–7	4–2
Coldstream	0–3		3–2	3–0	6–0	0–3	4–0	3–1	1–3	3–2	5–0	1–3	4–1
Dunbar United	5–2	5–0		3–2	6–0	0–1	2–0	3–1	0–3	4–1	3–3	0–4	7–0
Easthouses Lily MW	4–2	4–4	0–4		1–0	1–5	1–2	1–3	2–1	2–1	1–4	0–3	6–2
Hawick Royal Albert	1–0	1–4	1–2	0–4		1–3	1–6	0–4	1–9	0–2	4–4	0–7	2–1
Hill of Beath Hawthorn	9–0	4–1	4–0	8–1	4–1		4–1	0–2	0–2	6–0	4–0	2–1	16–0
Leith Athletic	3–0	2–1	1–2	1–0	4–0	0–3		1–5	1–1	3–1	2–2	0–3	2–0
Musselburgh Athletic	3–0	4–0	3–1	5–0	7–0	1–1	5–0		5–2	2–2	6–1	0–5	1–0
Newtongrange Star	2–2	0–0	1–0	7–1	3–0	0–2	2–2	4–2		1–1	2–0	2–4	14–1
Oakley United	3–0	3–2	1–1	1–3	0–3	3–4	1–1	1–2	1–4		0–1	1–4	2–0
Peebles Rovers	3–0	0–6	1–2	2–1	3–1	1–6	3–5	2–3	1–3	2–2		2–6	1–2
Penicuik Athletic	1–0	4–2	1–1	4–0	3–1	1–1	8–0	1–1	4–0	2–1	3–0		9–0
Tweedmouth Rangers	3–5	3–3	0–8	0–3	1–3	0–2	0–3	1–5	0–5	0–2	3–4	0–4	

Updated to match(es) played on 27 April 2019. Source: East of Scotland Football League
Legend: Blue = home team win; Yellow = draw; Red = away team win.

== Conference B ==
Conference B
- Season: 2018–19
- Dates: 14 August 2018 – 27 April 2019
- Champions: Bonnyrigg Rose Athletic
- Matches: 156
- Goals: 746 (4.78 per match)
- Top goalscorer: Calum Smith (25 goals); Dundonald Bluebell
- Biggest home win: Bo'ness United 15–1 Eyemouth United (16 February 2019)
- Biggest away win: Eyemouth United 1–11 Haddington Athletic (6 April 2019)
- Highest scoring: Bo'ness United 15–1 Eyemouth United (16 February 2019)
- Longest winning run: 20 matches: Bonnyrigg Rose Athletic
- Longest unbeaten run: 22 matches: Bonnyrigg Rose Athletic
- Longest losing run: 24 matches: Eyemouth United
- Highest attendance: 528; Bonnyrigg Rose Athletic 6–0 Dalkeith Thistle (8 September 2018)
- All statistics correct as of 27 April 2019.

=== Teams and locations ===
Location of teams in 2018–19 East of Scotland Football League Conference B

Team	Location	Home ground	Capacity	Seats	Floodlit
Bo'ness United	Bo'ness	Newtown Park	2,500	0	No
Bonnyrigg Rose Athletic	Bonnyrigg	New Dundas Park	2,200	0	No
Burntisland Shipyard ^{[SFA]}	Burntisland	Recreation Park	1,000	0	No
Crossgates Primrose	Crossgates	Humbug Park	2,000	0	No
Dalkeith Thistle	Dalkeith	King's Park	2,000	0	Yes
Dundonald Bluebell	Cardenden	Moorside Park	2,000	0	No
Dunipace	Denny	Westfield Park	2,500	0	Yes
Eyemouth United	Eyemouth	Warner Park	500	0	No
Haddington Athletic	Haddington	Millfield Park	1,500	0	No
Lothian Thistle Hutchison Vale ^{[SFA]}	Edinburgh	Saughton Sports Complex	1,000	0	Yes
Sauchie Juniors	Sauchie	Beechwood Park	5,000	200	Yes
Tranent Juniors	Tranent	Foresters Park	2,300	44	No
Tynecastle	Edinburgh	Meggetland Stadium	4,388	500	Yes

=== League table ===
Pos	Team	Pld	W	D	L	GF	GA	GD	Pts	Qualification
1	Bonnyrigg Rose Athletic (Q)	24	22	1	1	105	17	+88	67	Qualification for the Championship play-off
2	Bo'ness United (Q)	24	18	4	2	81	27	+54	58	Qualification for the Premier Division
3	Tranent Juniors (Q)	24	16	2	6	81	37	+44	50	Qualification for the Premier Division
4	Dundonald Bluebell (Q)	24	15	4	5	79	42	+37	49	Qualification for the Premier Division
5	Crossgates Primrose (Q)	24	13	2	9	65	42	+23	41	Qualification for the Premier Division
6	Sauchie Juniors (Q)	24	12	4	8	50	39	+11	40	Qualification for the Premier Division
7	Lothian Thistle Hutchison Vale	24	10	3	11	43	47	−4	33	
8	Dalkeith Thistle	24	9	5	10	41	45	−4	32	
9	Haddington Athletic	24	9	4	11	72	54	+18	31	
10	Tynecastle	24	5	3	16	37	80	−43	18	
11	Burntisland Shipyard	24	5	1	18	39	87	−48	16	
12	Dunipace	24	4	3	17	32	66	−34	15	
13	Eyemouth United (Note: Eyemouth United deducted three points for fielding an ineligible player.)	24	0	0	24	21	163	−142	−3	

Source: East of Scotland Football League
Rules for classification: 1) Points; 2) Goal difference; 3) Number of goals scored
(Q) Qualified for the phase indicated

=== Results ===
Home \ Away	BNS	BRG	BTS	CRS	DAL	DND	DNP	EYE	HAD	LTV	SAU	TRA	TYN
Bo'ness United		1–4	6–1	2–1	2–1	3–1	1–0	15–1	2–2	5–0	1–0	4–1	5–2
Bonnyrigg Rose Athletic	1–3		4–1	2–1	6–0	3–3	6–0	9–0	2–0	5–1	5–0	2–0	13–1
Burntisland Shipyard	0–3	1–4		1–5	4–1	0–7	3–2	5–0	4–4	1–5	0–4	1–5	1–2
Crossgates Primrose	1–2	0–3	2–1		2–0	0–3	5–1	10–1	0–0	2–0	3–2	4–1	2–1
Dalkeith Thistle	0–4	1–2	3–1	2–1		3–3	3–0	6–0	3–2	2–2	0–1	3–3	1–3
Dundonald Bluebell	3–3	1–3	3–2	7–3	1–0		5–0	6–0	4–2	1–2	2–0	0–2	5–1
Dunipace	2–5	0–4	5–0	1–4	1–1	1–3		4–0	2–3	1–3	0–2	1–4	2–1
Eyemouth United	1–8	0–4	1–7	0–8	1–2	3–6	0–5		1–11	1–3	2–7	0–6	3–5
Haddington Athletic	0–4	0–4	5–0	1–4	4–2	3–4	2–1	8–0		2–2	2–3	0–1	7–0
Lothian Thistle Hutchison Vale	0–2	1–3	0–1	3–1	0–1	2–4	3–1	4–2	0–1		1–4	2–1	2–2
Sauchie Juniors	0–0	1–5	5–2	1–1	1–1	3–2	2–2	7–1	3–2	0–2		1–3	1–0
Tranent Juniors	5–0	1–8	7–0	4–1	0–1	2–2	6–0	11–1	7–2	4–2	1–0		3–1
Tynecastle	0–0	0–3	4–2	3–4	1–4	1–3	0–0	7–2	1–9	0–3	1–2	0–3	

Updated to match(es) played on 27 April 2019. Source: East of Scotland Football League
Legend: Blue = home team win; Yellow = draw; Red = away team win.

== Conference C ==
Conference C
- Season: 2018–19
- Dates: 11 August 2018 – 18 May 2019
- Champions: Broxburn Athletic
- Matches: 156
- Goals: 736 (4.72 per match)
- Top goalscorer: Tommy Coyne (42 goals); Linlithgow Rose
- Biggest home win: Jeanfield Swifts 9–0 Craigroyston (29 September 2018)
- Biggest away win: Inverkeithing Hillfield Swifts 0–10 Linlithgow Rose (15 August 2018); Ormiston 1–11 Linlithgow Rose (29 September 2018)
- Highest scoring: Ormiston 1–11 Linlithgow Rose (29 September 2018)
- Longest winning run: 9 matches: Linlithgow Rose
- Longest unbeaten run: 14 matches: Jeanfield Swifts
- Longest winless run: 9 matches: Edinburgh United
- Longest losing run: 6 matches: Inverkeithing Hillfield Swifts
- Highest attendance: 618; Linlithgow Rose 3–2 Jeanfield Swifts (30 March 2019)
- All statistics correct as of 18 May 2019.

=== Teams and locations ===
Location of teams in 2018–19 East of Scotland Football League Conference C

Team	Location	Home ground	Capacity	Seats	Floodlit
Blackburn United	Blackburn	New Murrayfield Park	1,500	0	Yes
Broxburn Athletic	Broxburn	Albyn Park	1,000	0	Yes
Camelon Juniors	Camelon	Carmuirs Park	2,000	0	No
Craigroyston	Edinburgh	St Mark’s Park	2,000	0	No
Edinburgh United	Edinburgh	Paties Road Stadium	2,500	200	No
Heriot-Watt University	Edinburgh	Riccarton Campus	200	0	Yes
Inverkeithing Hillfield Swifts	Inverkeithing	Ballast Bank	1,000	0	No
Jeanfield Swifts	Perth	Riverside Stadium	1,000	0	No
Linlithgow Rose ^{[SFA]}	Linlithgow	Prestonfield	2,264	301	Yes
Ormiston	Ormiston	Recreation Park	2,000	0	No
Preston Athletic ^{[SFA]}	Prestonpans	Pennypit Park	1,500	313	Yes
St Andrews United	St Andrews	Recreation Park	2,000	0	No
Stirling University Reserves	Stirling	Gannochy Sports Centre	1,000	0	Yes

=== League table ===
Pos	Team	Pld	W	D	L	GF	GA	GD	Pts	Qualification
1	Broxburn Athletic (Q)	24	22	0	2	83	21	+62	66	Qualification for the Championship play-off
2	Linlithgow Rose (Q)	24	20	1	3	106	24	+82	61	Qualification for the Premier Division
3	Jeanfield Swifts (Q)	24	17	4	3	91	30	+61	55	Qualification for the Premier Division
4	Camelon Juniors (Q)	24	17	3	4	87	33	+54	54	Qualification for the Premier Division
5	Blackburn United (Q)	24	10	2	12	61	59	+2	32	Qualification for the Premier Division
6	Preston Athletic	24	9	5	10	50	57	−7	32	
7	Heriot-Watt University	24	9	3	12	42	53	−11	30	
8	St Andrews United	24	8	5	11	41	46	−5	29	
9	Stirling University reserves	24	7	4	13	46	78	−32	25	
10	Craigroyston	24	7	1	16	28	79	−51	22	
11	Edinburgh United	24	5	2	17	34	69	−35	17	
12	Inverkeithing Hillfield Swifts	24	5	1	18	35	85	−50	16	
13	Ormiston	24	3	3	18	32	102	−70	12	

Source: East of Scotland Football League
Rules for classification: 1) Points; 2) Goal difference; 3) Number of goals scored
(Q) Qualified for the phase indicated

=== Results ===
Home \ Away	BLA	BRX	CAM	CRA	EDI	HWU	IHS	JEA	LTH	ORM	PRE	STA	STU
Blackburn United		1–2	1–4	0–2	5–1	3–4	3–1	0–3	0–7	5–1	4–1	4–1	0–3
Broxburn Athletic	5–2		1–0	4–0	3–0	3–1	5–0	3–2	4–3	8–0	2–0	2–1	6–1
Camelon	3–2	1–2		9–1	5–1	3–0	6–2	1–5	2–0	8–0	4–1	6–1	6–1
Craigroyston	0–3	1–3	2–4		0–3	1–0	3–1	3–5	0–4	2–2	3–2	0–5	1–2
Edinburgh United	0–5	1–3	0–1	4–0		3–0	3–2	1–1	0–2	4–0	1–4	2–2	2–5
Heriot-Watt University	1–1	0–7	3–3	1–2	3–0		4–1	1–2	0–6	6–1	1–2	2–0	2–0
Inverkeithing Hillfield Swifts	1–4	1–4	1–5	4–0	2–0	2–4		1–4	0–10	3–1	3–5	0–2	3–2
Jeanfield Swifts	2–2	2–0	3–3	9–0	4–1	2–1	5–0		2–1	8–1	6–1	2–3	3–3
Linlithgow Rose	5–1	3–0	2–0	8–0	6–1	3–0	4–1	3–2		3–3	5–0	3–1	2–1
Ormiston	2–5	0–4	2–4	0–4	3–2	2–4	3–4	0–4	1–11		2–4	1–0	2–3
Preston Athletic	4–3	1–4	0–0	1–2	4–1	4–1	3–0	0–3	3–5	4–1		2–2	1–1
St Andrews United	1–3	0–4	0–3	3–0	2–0	2–2	3–0	0–3	1–4	1–1	1–1		4–1
Stirling University Reserves	5–4	0–4	2–6	2–1	7–3	0–1	2–2	1–9	1–6	1–3	2–2	0–5	

Updated to match(es) played on 18 May 2019. Source: East of Scotland Football League
Legend: Blue = home team win; Yellow = draw; Red = away team win.

== Championship play-off ==
At the end of the season, the three conference winners took part in a three match round-robin competition to determine the league champion, and subject to meeting the required licensing criteria, promotion to the Lowland League. Bonnyrigg Rose Athletic were crowned champions after winning both of their matches, and later gained promotion having eventually received their SFA licence on 14 June 2019.

Pos	Team	Pld	W	PW	PL	L	GF	GA	GD	Pts	Promotion or qualification
1	Bonnyrigg Rose Athletic (C, P)	2	2	0	0	0	5	3	+2	6	Promotion to the Lowland League
2	Penicuik Athletic	2	1	0	0	1	4	4	0	3	Qualification for the Premier Division
3	Broxburn Athletic	2	0	0	0	2	4	6	−2	0	Qualification for the Premier Division

Source: East of Scotland Football League
Rules for classification: 1) Points; 2) Goal difference; 3) Number of goals scored; 4) Result of head-to-head match; 5) Away goals scored; 6) Away goals scored in head-to-head match(es); 7) Conference record: (1. Bonnyrigg, 2. Broxburn, 3. Penicuik)
(C) Champion; (P) Promoted

27 April 2019	Penicuik Athletic	3–2	Broxburn Athletic	Penicuik
14:30	Williams 11'; McIntosh 47'; Somerville 53'		Donaldson 17'; Kelly 80'	Stadium: Penicuik Park; Attendance: 454; Referee: Jordan Curran

1 May 2019	Bonnyrigg Rose Athletic	2–1	Penicuik Athletic	Bonnyrigg
18:45	Currie 31'; Brett 63'		Somerville 89'	Stadium: New Dundas Park; Attendance: 1,012; Referee: Peter Stuart

4 May 2019	Broxburn Athletic	2–3	Bonnyrigg Rose Athletic	Broxburn
14:30	Donaldson 31'; Nimmo 37'		Hoskins 68'; Murrel 83'; Turner 90+4'	Stadium: Albyn Park; Attendance: 956; Referee: Craig Wilson

== Notes ==
^{SFA} Club has an SFA Licence (as of March 2019) and are eligible for promotion to the Lowland League should they win the championship play-off.
