= 2019–20 East of Scotland Football League =

East of Scotland Football League
- Season: 2019–20
- Champions: Bo'ness United

The 2019–20 East of Scotland Football League (known as the Central Taxis East of Scotland League for sponsorship reasons) was the 91st season of the East of Scotland Football League, and the 6th season as the sixth tier of the Scottish football pyramid system. The season began on 27 July 2019. Bonnyrigg Rose Athletic were the reigning champions but could not defend their title after being promoted to the Lowland Football League.

The league reverted to a two-tier setup for the first time since 2015, featuring a Premier Division of 16 teams and a First Division containing two seeded parallel conferences each with 12 teams.

On 13 March 2020, the league was indefinitely suspended due to the 2019–20 coronavirus outbreak before it was officially curtailed on 24 April 2020. Bo'ness United were declared champions of the Premier Division on a 'points per game' method while Lothian Thistle Hutchison Vale and Tynecastle were declared winners of their respective First Division conferences.

== Teams ==
The following teams changed division after the 2018–19 season.

=== To East of Scotland Football League ===
Relegated from Lowland Football League

- Whitehill Welfare

Transferred from East Superleague

- Glenrothes

Transferred from East Premier League North

- Kinnoull

=== From East of Scotland Football League ===
Promoted to Lowland Football League

- Bonnyrigg Rose Athletic

Withdrawn

- Eyemouth United

== Premier Division ==
East of Scotland Football League Premier Division
- Season: 2019–20
- Dates: 27 July 2019 – 24 April 2020
- Champions: Bo'ness United
- Promoted: Bo'ness United
- Matches: 156
- Goals: 580 (3.72 per match)
- Biggest home win: Linlithgow Rose 6–0 Whitehill Welfare; (3 August 2019)
- Biggest away win: Crossgates Primrose 1–6 Bo'ness United; (3 August 2019); Newtongrange Star 0–5 Penicuik Athletic; (16 November 2019)
- Highest scoring: Jeanfield Swifts 7–2 Camelon Juniors; (27 July 2019); Musselburgh Athletic 3–6 Jeanfield Swifts; (26 October 2019)
- Longest winning run: 7 matches: Bo'ness United
- Longest unbeaten run: 12 matches: Bo'ness United
- Longest winless run: 8 matches: Newtongrange Star
- Longest losing run: 6 matches: 3 teams
- Highest attendance: 1,150; Bo'ness United 2–1 Linlithgow Rose (4 January 2020)

=== Teams ===
The Premier Division contains the top five teams from each of the three Conferences in the 2018–19 season, the best 6th-placed team (Sauchie Juniors) and Whitehill Welfare who were relegated from the Lowland League.

Location of teams in 2019–20 East of Scotland Football League Premier Division

=== Stadia and locations ===
Team	Location	Home ground	Capacity	Seats	Floodlit
Blackburn United ^{[SFA]}	Blackburn	New Murrayfield Park	1,500	0	Yes
Bo'ness United	Bo'ness	Newtown Park	2,500	0	Yes
Broxburn Athletic ^{[SFA]}	Broxburn	Albyn Park	1,000	0	Yes
Camelon Juniors	Camelon	Carmuirs Park	2,000	0	Yes
Crossgates Primrose	Crossgates	Humbug Park	2,000	0	No
Dunbar United	Dunbar	New Countess Park	2,500	0	Yes
Dundonald Bluebell ^{[SFA]}	Cardenden	Moorside Park	2,000	0	Yes
Hill of Beath Hawthorn ^{[SFA]}	Hill of Beath	Keirs Park	2,000	0	Yes
Jeanfield Swifts ^{[SFA]}	Perth	Riverside Stadium	1,000	0	Yes
Linlithgow Rose ^{[SFA]}	Linlithgow	Prestonfield	2,264	301	Yes
Musselburgh Athletic	Musselburgh	Olivebank Stadium	2,500	0	No
Newtongrange Star	Newtongrange	New Victoria Park	2,300	30	Yes
Penicuik Athletic ^{[SFA]}	Penicuik	Penicuik Park	2,000	0	Yes
Sauchie Juniors	Sauchie	Beechwood Park	5,000	200	Yes
Tranent Juniors	Tranent	Foresters Park	2,300	44	Yes
Whitehill Welfare ^{[SFA]}	Rosewell	Ferguson Park	2,614	192	No

=== League table ===
Pos	Team	Pld	W	D	L	GF	GA	GD	Pts	PPG	Promotion or relegation
1	Bo'ness United (C, P)	21	14	5	2	42	22	+20	47	2.24	Promotion to the Lowland League
2	Hill of Beath Hawthorn (Note: Hill of Beath Hawthorn were awarded 2 points and Sauchie Juniors deducted 3 points after Sauchie fielded a suspended player in their match on 27 July 2019.)	18	10	5	3	45	20	+25	37 (Note: Hill of Beath Hawthorn finished second based on the 'points per game' measure, despite accumulating fewer points than Broxburn Athletic.)	2.06	
3	Broxburn Athletic	19	11	5	3	40	29	+11	38	2.00	
4	Tranent Juniors	20	10	4	6	37	25	+12	34	1.70	
5	Camelon Juniors	20	10	4	6	38	33	+5	34	1.70	
6	Jeanfield Swifts	16	8	2	6	36	28	+8	26 (Note: Jeanfield Swifts finished sixth based on the 'points per game' measure, despite accumulating fewer points than Dundonald Bluebell, Penicuik Athletic and Musselburgh Athletic.)	1.63	
7	Dundonald Bluebell	18	8	3	7	46	35	+11	27	1.50	
8	Penicuik Athletic	18	8	3	7	37	32	+5	27	1.50	
9	Linlithgow Rose	17	7	3	7	41	37	+4	24 (Note: Linlithgow Rose finished ninth based on the 'points per game' measure, despite accumulating fewer points than Musselburgh Athletic.)	1.41	
10	Musselburgh Athletic	21	8	3	10	42	42	0	27	1.29	
11	Dunbar United	21	6	5	10	32	39	−7	23	1.10	
12	Crossgates Primrose	21	6	5	10	37	55	−18	23	1.10	
13	Sauchie Juniors	22	6	5	11	33	44	−11	20	0.91	
14	Blackburn United	20	5	3	12	22	44	−22	18	0.90	Spared relegation (Note: No teams were relegated from the Premier Division after the season was curtailed due to the COVID-19 pandemic.)
15	Whitehill Welfare	18	4	4	10	20	35	−15	16	0.89	Spared relegation
16	Newtongrange Star	22	4	3	15	32	60	−28	15	0.68	Spared relegation

Source: East of Scotland Football League
Rules for classification: 1) Points per game
(C) Champions; (P) Promoted

=== Results ===
Home \ Away	BLU	BNS	BRX	CML	CRS	DNB	DBL	HOB	JFS	LIN	MUS	NGS	PEN	SAU	TRA	WHI
Blackburn United	—	0–4	2–3	1–1	0–2	4–0		1–1		2–4	2–1	1–4	1–0		0–4	
Bo'ness United	0–1	—	1–1	2–1		0–0	1–0	1–0		2–1	4–3	3–1		1–0	2–1	1–2
Broxburn Athletic	3–1	1–1	—		3–2	4–3		1–1		1–3		5–1	1–2	1–0		1–0
Camelon Juniors	1–2		2–2	—	2–1	2–1	2–1		3–0	5–1				3–1	1–1	
Crossgates Primrose	3–1	1–6	2–4		—	2–2	3–3	1–4	2–0	3–2	2–1					3–1
Dunbar United	0–0	1–2		0–0		—	3–4		2–1	1–2	3–2	5–3			1–1	4–1
Dundonald Bluebell		2–2	2–3		6–1	0–2	—					6–1	2–3	4–3		3–1
Hill of Beath Hawthorn		1–2		5–1	4–1	0–1	6–2	—	4–3		3–0		2–0	6–1		2–0
Jeanfield Swifts		0–1		7–2	2–2				—	2–0	4–2	2–2	1–0		2–1	
Linlithgow Rose	4–1			2–3						—	3–3	3–2		4–1	0–1	6–0
Musselburgh Athletic				2–0	3–0	2–1	2–1	1–1	3–6	6–2	—	1–3		2–1	0–0	
Newtongrange Star		2–3		1–3	2–2	2–1	0–3	1–1	0–1		1–4	—	0–5	4–1	0–3	0–1
Penicuik Athletic	4–2	3–3		0–3	4–1	4–0	1–4	2–1		2–2			—		2–0	2–2
Sauchie Juniors	3–0		3–0		1–1		0–0	2–2	2–4	2–2	2–1	4–1	1–2	—	1–4	1–1
Tranent Juniors			1–2	2–1	4–2		1–3		2–1		2–1		5–2	0–1	—	3–3
Whitehill Welfare	2–0		1–1	1–2							1–2	2–1		1–2	0–1	—

Source: East of Scotland Football League
Legend: Blue = home team win; Yellow = draw; Red = away team win.

== First Division ==
The teams who did not qualify for the Premier Division, along with Glenrothes, were ranked according to their position and points in each Conference before being assigned into two seeded First Division Conferences A and B. Kinnoull later took the place of Eyemouth, who withdrew from the league.

=== Conference A ===
East of Scotland Football League First Division Conference A
- Season: 2019–20
- Dates: 27 July 2019 – 24 April 2020
- Matches: 175 (Note: This tally includes 97 cross-conference matches played, with 452 goals scored.)
- Goals: 759 (4.34 per match)
- Biggest home win: Tynecastle 13–0 Peebles Rovers; (2 November 2019) (Note: This result was in a cross-conference match.)
- Biggest away win: Craigroyston 0–11 Leith Athletic; (4 January 2020)
- Highest scoring: Tynecastle 13–0 Peebles Rovers; (2 November 2019); Tynecastle 10–3 Oakley United; (18 January 2020)
- Longest winning run: 6 matches: Kinnoull & Lothian Thistle Hutchison Vale (Note: Lothian Thistle Hutchison Vale's winning streak included victories of 3–0 over Inverkeithing Hillfield Swifts, 1–0 over Easthouses Lily MW, 3–2 over Preston Athletic, 6–1 over Hawick Royal Albert United and 6–0 over Arniston Rangers in cross-conference matches.)
- Longest unbeaten run: 11 matches: Lothian Thistle Hutchison Vale (Note: Lothian Thistle Hutchison Vale's unbeaten streak included a 5–0 win over Coldstream, a 4–4 draw with Tweedmouth Rangers, a 4–2 win over Glenrothes and a 2–0 win over Dalkeith Thistle in cross-conference matches.)
- Longest winless run: 25 matches: Craigroyston (Note: Craigroyston's winless streak included a 2–2 draw with Arniston Rangers, a 1–4 loss to Dalkeith Thistle, 2–5 losses to Glenrothes and Stirling University, a 1–7 loss to Inverkeithing Hillfield Swifts, a 0–4 loss to Tweedmouth Rangers, a 0–10 loss to Edinburgh United and a 1–1 draw with Preston Athletic in cross-conference matches.)
- Longest losing run: 10 matches: Craigroyston

Location of teams in 2019–20 East of Scotland Football League First Division Conference A

==== Stadia and locations ====
Team	Location	Home ground	Capacity	Seats	Floodlit
Burntisland Shipyard ^{[SFA]}	Burntisland	Recreation Park	1,000	0	No
Craigroyston	Edinburgh	St Mark's Park	2,000	0	No
Dunipace	Denny	Westfield Park	2,000	0	Yes
Haddington Athletic	Haddington	Millfield Park	1,500	0	Yes
Heriot-Watt University	Edinburgh	Riccarton Campus	200	0	Yes
Kinnoull	Perth	Tulloch Park	1,200	0	Yes
Leith Athletic	Edinburgh	Peffermill 3G	500	0	Yes
Lothian Thistle Hutchison Vale ^{[SFA]}	Edinburgh	Saughton Sports Complex	1,000	0	Yes
Oakley United	Oakley	Blairwood Park	2,000	0	No
Ormiston	Ormiston	New Recreation Park	1,000	0	No
Peebles Rovers	Peebles	Whitestone Park	2,250	250	No
St Andrews United	St Andrews	Recreation Park	2,000	0	No

==== League table ====
Pos	Team	Pld	W	D	L	GF	GA	GD	Pts	PPG	Promotion or qualification
1	Lothian Thistle Hutchison Vale (C, P)	24	16	6	2	66	29	+37	54	2.25	Promotion to the Premier Division
2	Leith Athletic	25	16	5	4	67	29	+38	53	2.12	
3	Kinnoull (Note: Kinnoull deducted 3 points for fielding suspended player.)	17	12	2	3	44	11	+33	35 (Note: Kinnoull finished third based on the 'points per game' measure, despite accumulating fewer points than Dunipace, Heriot-Watt University and Haddington Athletic.)	2.06	
4	Dunipace	24	15	3	6	67	27	+40	48	2.00	
5	Heriot-Watt University	25	14	1	10	60	37	+23	43	1.72	
6	Haddington Athletic	24	13	2	9	65	35	+30	41	1.71	
7	St Andrews United	22	11	2	9	61	37	+24	35	1.59	
8	Oakley United	20	10	1	9	38	36	+2	31	1.55	
9	Burntisland Shipyard	20	8	5	7	59	43	+16	29	1.45	
10	Ormiston	19	3	4	12	24	68	−44	13	0.68	
11	Peebles Rovers	20	2	2	16	12	81	−69	8	0.40	
12	Craigroyston	25	0	3	22	24	122	−98	3	0.12	

Source: East of Scotland Football League
Rules for classification: 1) Points per game
(C) Champions; (P) Promoted

=== Conference B ===
East of Scotland Football League First Division Conference B
- Season: 2019–20
- Dates: 27 July 2019 – 24 April 2020
- Matches: 178
- Goals: 860 (4.83 per match)
- Biggest home win: Tynecastle 15–1 Tweedmouth Rangers; (5 October 2019)
- Biggest away win: Tweedmouth Rangers 0–6 Preston Athletic; (31 July 2019); Peebles Rovers 0–6 Edinburgh United; (26 October 2019); Craigroyston 1–7 Inverkeithing Hillfield Swifts; (14 December 2019)
- Highest scoring: Tynecastle 15–1 Tweedmouth Rangers; (5 October 2019)
- Longest winning run: 18 matches: Tynecastle (Note: Tynecastle's winning streak included a 13–0 win over Peebles Rovers, 3–1 wins over Haddington Athletic and Heriot Watt University, and a 2–1 win over Kinnoull in cross-conference matches. Their unbeaten streak was extended in part with a 2–2 draw with Lothian Thistle Hutchison Vale, a 0–0 draw with Leith Athletic, a 10–3 win over Oakley United and a 4–0 win over St Andrews United in cross-conference matches.)
- Longest unbeaten run: 23 matches: Tynecastle
- Longest winless run: 16 matches: Tweedmouth Rangers (Note: Tweedmouth Rangers' winless streak included a 3–5 loss to Heriot Watt University, a 4–4 draw with Lothian Thistle Hutchison Vale, a 1–1 draw with Ormiston and a 0–4 loss to Haddington Athletic in cross-conference matches.)
- Longest losing run: 10 matches: Easthouses Lily Miners Welfare (Note: Easthouses Lily Miners Welfare's losing streak included a 0–3 loss to Kinnoull, a 1–8 loss to Dunipace, a 2–6 loss to Heriot Watt University, a 3–4 loss to Ormiston and a 0–1 loss to Lothian Thistle Hutchison Vale in cross-conference matches.)

Location of teams in 2019–20 East of Scotland Football League First Division Conference B

==== Stadia and locations ====
Team	Location	Home ground	Capacity	Seats	Floodlit
Arniston Rangers	Gorebridge	Newbyres Park	3,000	0	No
Coldstream ^{[SFA]}	Coldstream	Home Park	1,000	0	No
Dalkeith Thistle	Dalkeith	King's Park	2,000	0	Yes
Easthouses Lily MW ^{[SFA]}	Easthouses	Newbattle Complex	1,500	100	Yes
Edinburgh United	Edinburgh	Paties Road Stadium	2,500	200	No
Glenrothes	Glenrothes	Warout Stadium	5,000	730	No
Hawick Royal Albert United ^{[SFA]}	Hawick	Albert Park	1,000	500	Yes
Inverkeithing Hillfield Swifts	Inverkeithing	Ballast Bank	1,000	0	No
Preston Athletic ^{[SFA]}	Prestonpans	Pennypit Park	1,500	313	Yes
Stirling University Reserves	Stirling	Gannochy Sports Centre	1,000	0	Yes
Tweedmouth Rangers	Berwick-upon-Tweed	Old Shielfield	1,000	0	No
Tynecastle ^{[SFA]}	Edinburgh	Meggetland Sports Complex	4,388	500	Yes

==== League table ====
Pos	Team	Pld	W	D	L	GF	GA	GD	Pts	PPG	Promotion or qualification
1	Tynecastle (C, P)	23	21	2	0	125	22	+103	65	2.83	Promotion to the Premier Division
2	Inverkeithing Hillfield Swifts (P)	20	15	0	5	56	30	+26	45	2.25	Promotion to the Premier Division
3	Glenrothes	21	13	2	6	56	39	+17	41	1.95	
4	Edinburgh United	20	11	2	7	59	39	+20	35	1.75	
5	Preston Athletic	21	10	4	7	50	34	+16	34	1.62	
6	Dalkeith Thistle	22	10	3	9	46	43	+3	33	1.50	
7	Coldstream	22	10	1	11	42	51	−9	31	1.41	
8	Stirling University reserves	25	7	2	16	44	83	−39	23	0.92	
9	Easthouses Lily Miners Welfare	18	4	0	14	35	59	−24	12 (Note: Easthouses Lily Miners Welfare finished 9th based on the 'points per game' measure, despite accumulating fewer points than Tweedmouth Rangers and Hawick Royal Albert United.)	0.67	
10	Tweedmouth Rangers	24	4	4	16	47	94	−47	16	0.67	
11	Hawick Royal Albert United	25	4	3	18	37	90	−53	15	0.60	
12	Arniston Rangers (Note: Arniston Rangers deducted 6 points for fielding ineligible players.)	22	4	3	15	21	66	−45	9	0.41	

Source: East of Scotland Football League
Rules for classification: 1) Points per game
(C) Champions; (P) Promoted

=== Results ===
Teams in each Conference play each other twice, once at home and once away. Teams also play each team from the other Conference once (six home and six away), for a total of 34 games.

Home \ Away	BUR	CRG	DPC	HAD	HER	KIN	LEI	LTV	OAK	ORM	PEE	STA	ARN	COL	DAL	ELM	EDN	GLE	HAW	IHS	PRE	STI	TWE	TYN
Burntisland Shipyard		7–0	3–0		1–4		5–6			3–0	1–1										1–4	9–2	5–1	
Craigroyston	2–6			1–8	1–6	1–5	0–11	2–5	1–3		1–3	1–4			1–4					1–7	1–1	2–5	0–4	
Dunipace	0–0	6–0		3–2			1–0	1–1	1–2	7–1	5–0		7–0			8–1	2–0	0–2	2–0					
Haddington Athletic	2–1		1–0		4–2		2–3	3–3		2–2	4–1	1–2			4–2					1–2	5–0	6–0	4–0	1–3
Heriot-Watt University		5–0	0–3	1–0		0–2				1–1	5–1	3–0								1–2	2–3	6–0	5–3	1–3
Kinnoull	1–2		3–2							8–0		2–1	7–0	3–0		3–0	4–0		2–0					
Leith Athletic	1–1	3–2	1–1		1–0			1–1	0–1	4–0	5–0	1–0			2–0					3–2	2–1	3–1	7–1	0–0
Lothian Thistle Hutchison Vale		4–1	2–0	2–1	1–3	2–0	3–1			4–1		1–0	6–0	5–0		1–0	0–3	4–2	6–1					
Oakley United	3–2	2–0		1–2	2–0	0–1	0–3	1–1				0–4		0–3		0–1			5–0					
Ormiston	2–6	2–2	1–2								4–0				0–4					0–3	1–3		1–1	
Peebles Rovers					0–2		1–2		1–4				1–0	0–3			0–6	0–1	1–1					
St Andrews United	4–0	4–0	2–4	1–4	3–0	1–1	3–3		0–5	6–0	8–0		5–1	1–3				8–1	4–2					
Arniston Rangers		2–2			1–3		1–3								0–0		1–1	1–3	1–3	0–1		4–3	2–1	1–5
Coldstream				0–2	1–0										2–1		3–4			2–4	0–2	4–0	5–0	1–5
Dalkeith Thistle			2–4					0–2	3–2				5–0	3–0		2–1		1–2		2–1	0–5	3–1	2–2	1–6
Easthouses Lily Miners Welfare					2–6					3–4				0–1	0–5		3–4	2–3	7–2	0–3	1–2		5–1	
Edinburgh United	3–3	10–0		0–4	1–2					6–0			3–2	2–3				1–3		2–1		4–1		
Glenrothes	5–1	5–2		3–2			2–1						1–2	6–0						1–2	1–1	4–0	3–3	
Hawick Royal Albert United	2–2			2–0	1–2					3–4			1–0		6–2	1–6	0–2	2–5		0–5		1–1	1–2	
Inverkeithing Hillfield Swifts								0–3	2–1		5–1							4–3	4–2		4–2	3–0		1–5
Preston Athletic						0–0		2–3					0–1	2–1	2–2				6–1			4–2		
Stirling University reserves			1–5			0–1			1–3		5–0			2–2		4–3			5–2		3–2		2–1	1–5
Tweedmouth Rangers			2–3					4–4			6–1			2–6	0–2		5–6		4–3		0–6	2–3		1–3
Tynecastle						2–1		2–2	10–3		13–0	4–0	5–1	7–2		9–0	2–1	2–0	12–0		3–2	4–1	15–1	

Legend: Blue = home team win; Yellow = draw; Red = away team win.

=== First Division play-offs ===
Play-offs were due to be held to decide the overall First Division winner, and if necessary the third team to be promoted to the Premier Division. These were subsequently cancelled as a result of the coronavirus pandemic.

== Notes ==
^{SFA} Club has an SFA Licence (as of July 2019) and are eligible to participate in the Lowland League promotion play-off should they win the Premier Division.
