= James Fairlie =

James Fairlie may refer to:

- James Fairlie (minister), Scottish minister of the Church of Scotland
- James Ogilvie Fairlie, Scottish amateur golfer and landowner
- Jamie Fairlie, Scottish footballer
- Jim Fairlie (MSP), member of the Scottish Parliament

== See also ==
- Jim Fairlie (disambiguation)
