= Livingston United F.C. =

Association football club in Scotland

Livingston United
- Full name: Livingston United Football Club
- Founded: 1970
- Ground: Station Park, Deans, Livingston
- Capacity: 2,000
- Coordinates: 55°54′3″N 3°33′32″W
- Manager: Colin Sutherland
- League: East of Scotland League Second Division
- 2025–26: East of Scotland League Third Division, 4th of 11 (promoted)
Home colours	Away colours

Livingston United Football Club are a Scottish football club based in Livingston, West Lothian. The club joined the Scottish Junior Football Association in 1970, having existed as a Juvenile side since 1915. Their home ground is Station Park. They now play in the East of Scotland Football League

The SJFA restructured prior to the 2006–07 season, and United found themselves in the 15-team East Region, South Division. They finished 15th (bottom) in their first season in the division.

The team is managed by Colin Sutherland.

The team captain is Grant MacDonald.

Livingston United managed to gain promotion to the East Of Scotland Second Division in the 2025/26 season after a 4th place finish, giving them automatic promotion.

== Club staff ==
Role	Name
Club President	(Scotland) Ann Gregory
Club Secretary	(Scotland) David Meek
Treasurer	(Scotland) Ann Dryburgh
Assistant Treasurer	(Scotland) Graham Nichol
Advertising/Commercial	(Scotland) Jim Barrie
General Committee	(Scotland) Brian McCloskey
General Committee	(Scotland) Stuart Buckle
Catering	(Scotland) Margaret Barrie
Development Team Secretary	(Scotland) David Carmichael

=== Coaching staff ===
Role	Name
Manager	(Scotland) Colin Sutherland
First Team Coach	(Scotland) Derek Sutherland
First Team Coach	(Scotland) Steven Sutherland
Goalkeeping Coach	(Scotland) Steve Paris
Assistant Coach	(Scotland) Kenny Lessels

== Current squad ==
As of 31 November 2023

Note: Flags indicate national team as defined under FIFA eligibility rules; some limited exceptions apply. Players may hold more than one non-FIFA nationality.

No.	Pos.	Nation	Player
—	DF	SCO	Zak Avinou
—	DF	SCO	Dan Lennie
—	DF	SCO	Ryan Allan
—	MF	SCO	Grant MacDonald

No.	Pos.	Nation	Player
—	MF	SCO	Euan Arthur
—	MF	SCO	Conlon Burchill
—	MF	SCO	Jack barclay
—	MF	SCO	Kieran McColgan
—	MF	SCO	Grant Mitchell
—	MF	SCO	Ethan Quinn
—	FW	SCO	Derek Keough
—	FW	SCO	Ross Guy
—	DF	SCO	Ryan Mahood

== Notable former players ==
- Jamie Fairlie
- Peter Houston
- Dave Gibson
- Mark Yardley

== Managerial history ==
Name	Nationality	Years
Bobby Ramsay	(Scotland)	1980-1982
Robin Gibson	(Scotland)	1982-2006
Steven Cornwell	(Scotland)	2009-2010
Andy Johnstone	(Scotland)	2010-2013
Paul McKinlay	(Scotland)	2013
Bobby Ramsay ^{c}	(Scotland)	2013
Graeme Crawford	(Scotland)	2014-2015
Andrew Malone	(Scotland)	2017-2021
Stuart McInnes	(Scotland)	2021-2022
David Kinross	(Scotland)	2022-2023
Colin Sutherland	(Scotland)	2023-

^{c} Caretaker manager
