= Jim Fairlie =

Jim Fairlie may refer to:

- Jim Fairlie (MSP), member of the Scottish Parliament
- Jim Fairlie (politician, born 1940), former Deputy Leader of the Scottish National Party

== See also ==
- James Fairlie (disambiguation)
