= Cowdenbeath Central F.C. =

Association football club in Scotland

Cowdenbeath Central
- Full name: Cowdenbeath Central Football Club
- Founded: 2025
- Ground: Alex Venters Memorial Park; Rose Street; Cowdenbeath
- Capacity: 500
- Coordinates: 56°6′11″N 3°20′51″W
- League: East of Scotland League Third Division
- 2025–26: East of Scotland League Third Division, 7th of 11
Home colours	Away colours

Cowdenbeath Central Football Club is a Scottish football club, based in Cowdenbeath, Fife. The team competes in the East of Scotland League Third Division, having been elected to the league in 2025.

== History ==
The club was formed in 2025 as the adult side of Blue Brazil Football Club, a youth football club that was itself founded in 1996.

== Ground ==
The club play at Alex Venters Memorial Park in the south of Cowdenbeath. Significant work was done during the summer of 2025 to bring the ground up to standard for entry to the East of Scotland League.

== Kit ==
The team play in blue shirts and white shorts. Their away kit is based on the Brazilian home kit of yellow shirts, blue shorts and white socks.

== Honours ==
As a newly formed club, Cowdenbeath Central have not won any honours.
