= Edinburgh South C.F.C. =

Edinburgh South
- Full name: Edinburgh South Community Football Club
- Founded: 1969
- Ground: Inch Park; The Inch, Edinburgh; First team playing at Paties Road Park, Craiglockhart
- Coordinates: 55°54′53″N 3°15′9″W
- Manager: Ainslie Hunter
- League: East of Scotland League Premier Division
- 2025–26: East of Scotland League First Division, 3rd of 16 (promoted)
- Website: https://www.edinburghsouth.co.uk/
Home colours	Away colours

Edinburgh South Community Football Club is a Scottish football club based in the Inch district of south-eastern Edinburgh. Formed as a youth club in the 1960s, they successfully applied to have a senior team enter the East of Scotland Football League for the 2020–21 season as Edinburgh South FC.

As their usual ground (also used by other sports organisations including Lismore Rugby Club, situated close to the Cameron Toll Shopping Centre and Peffermill Playing Fields used by Edinburgh University) forms part of a public park and cannot be enclosed for the EoSFL as regulations require, they arranged to initially ground-share with Dalkeith Thistle, and also immediately advertised for a full squad of senior players, manager and coaching staff.

John O'Hara was announced as manager of the senior team on 12 May 2020, with Dale Richardson as assistant manager. For the 2022–23 season a new groundshare was arranged, this time within Southern Edinburgh at Paties Road in Craiglockhart, the home of Edinburgh United, with former player Ainslie Hunter appointed as Manager.

Beyond the Men's senior team, Edinburgh South has an established youth system, given the Scottish Football Association's Quality Mark as an accredited Platinum "Legacy" Club, with multiple teams for boys and girls of all ages, and local involvement. Edinburgh South also now have a senior Women's team, playing in the Scottish Women's Football League.

Edinburgh South's community side operates as a registered charity. They are now the biggest youth football club in the East of Scotland with over 800 players, 62+ teams and around 180 volunteer coaches and officials.
