= Jeanfield Swifts F.C. =

Association football club in Scotland

Jeanfield Swifts
- Full name: Jeanfield Swifts Football Club
- Nickname: Swifts
- Founded: 1908
- Ground: Riverside Stadium; Bute Drive; Perth
- Capacity: 1,000
- Coordinates: 56°24′50″N 3°26′35″W
- Manager: Robbie Holden
- League: East of Scotland League Premier Division
- 2025–26: East of Scotland League Premier Division, 5th of 16
- Website: http://www.jeanfieldswifts.co.uk
Home colours	Away colours

Jeanfield Swifts Football Club is a Scottish football club based in Perth. The team plays in the East of Scotland League Premier Division, having moved from the junior leagues in 2018. Their home ground is Riverside Stadium, located in the North Muirton area of the city, to which they moved in 2006 from Simpson Park, where they had been plagued by fires and vandalism. They are currently under the charge of Head coach Robbie Holden, who took over in the summer of 2023 after a successful period in charge of local rivals Luncarty.

== History ==
Up until the end of the 2005–06 season, they played in Tayside Division One in the Scottish Junior Football Association's East Region, and they won the championship in the division's final season. The SJFA restructured prior to the 2006–07 season, and Swifts found themselves in the twelve-team East Region Central Division. They finished in seventh place in their first season in the division. After a further five seasons in the division, they were promoted to the East Region Premier League as champions in 2011–12. In 2015–16, they were promoted as champions to the Superleague for the first time. They finished 13th and 14th in their two seasons in the Superleague.

Prior to the 2018–19 campaign, Swifts were admitted into the East of Scotland Football League. They finished third in Conference C and were promoted to the new 16-team Premier Division, after the league reverted to a two-tier system.

They became full members of the Scottish Football Association in June 2019, having applied in November 2018. This allowed them to make their debut in the Scottish Cup preliminary rounds in the 2019–20 season. The club progressed to the third round for the first time in 2023–24, beating SPFL opposition Elgin City 6–0 in the second round.

== Coaching staff ==
Position	Name
Manager	(Scotland) Robbie Holden
Assistant	(Scotland) Richie Montgomery
Coach	(Scotland) Bally Whytock
Coach	(Scotland) Chris Anton
Goalkeeping Coach	(Scotland) Nathan Downs
Physio	(Scotland) Amber Shearer

== League history since 1990 ==
Season	Division	Position
1990–91	Tayside Division One	3rd
1991–92	Tayside Division One	6th
1992–93	Tayside Division One	5th
1993–94	Tayside Division One	10th
1994–95	Tayside Division One	13th
1995–96	Tayside Division Two	1st
1996–97	Tayside Division One	10th
1997–98	Tayside Division One	12th
1998–99	Tayside Division One	3rd
1999–00	Tayside Division One	1st
2000–01	Tayside Premier League	12th
2001–02	Tayside Division One	3rd
2002–03	Tayside Division One	8th
2003–04	Tayside Division One	5th
2004–05	Tayside Division One	6th
2005–06	Tayside Division One	1st
2006–07	East Region, Central Division	7th
2007–08	East Region, Central Division	5th
2008–09	East Region, Central Division	4th
2009–10	East Region, Central Division	4th
2010–11	East Region, Central Division	4th
2011–12	East Region, Central Division	1st
2012–13	East Region, Premier League	8th
2013–14	East Region, Premier League	4th
2014–15	East Region, Premier League	7th
2015–16	East Region, Premier League	1st
2016–17	East Region, Super League	13th
2017–18	East Region, Super League	14th
2018–19	East of Scotland League Conference C	3rd
2019–20	East of Scotland Premier Division	6th
2020–21	East of Scotland Premier Division	null & void
2021–22	East of Scotland Premier Division	4th
2022–23	East of Scotland Premier Division	5th
2023-24	East of Scotland Premier Division	3rd
2024-25	East of Scotland Premier Division	3rd

== Honours ==
=== League ===
- Tayside Premier Division winners: 1972–73
- Tayside Division One winners: 1976–77, 1984–85, 1995–96, 1999–00
- Tayside District Division One winners: 2005–06
- East Region Central Division winners: 2011–12
- East Region Premier League winners: 2015–16
- Midland Junior League: 1943–44, 1945–46, 1946–47
- Perthshire Junior League winners: 1941–42, 1947–48, 1948–49, 1963–64, 1965–66, 1966–67, 1967–68, 1968–69

=== Cup ===
- Currie (Findlay & Co) Cup: 1940–41, 1943–44, 1944–45, 1947–48, 1948–49, 1950–51, 1966–67, 1987–88
- Intersport Cup: 1987–88, 1995–96
- Division One (Downfield SC) Cup: 2001–02
- Perth Advertiser (PA) Cup: 1940–41, 1941–42, 1942–43, 1944–45, 1945–46, 1946–47, 1947–48, 1966–67, 1968–69, 1970–71, 1991–92
- Division One (Red House Hotel) Cup: 2004–05
- Tayside Drybrough Cup: 1976–77
- Perthshire Junior Consolation Cup: 1942–43, 1943–44, 1944–45, 1945–46, 1949–50, 1963–64, 1966–67, 1967–68, 1968–69
- Laing Cup: 1943–44
- Craig Stephen Cup: 1975–76, 1976–77, 1978–79, 1981–82
- Perthshire Junior Charity Cup: 1940–41, 1941–42
- Perthshire Junior Cup: 1942–43, 1943–44, 1944–45, 1945–46, 1946–47, 1947–48, 1954–55, 1964–65, 1965–66, 1972–73
- Perthshire Rosebowl: 1948–49, 1949–50, 1958–59, 1959–60, 1961–62, 1966–67, 1967–68
- North & Tayside Inter-Regional Cup: 2011–12, 2012–13
- Central Division (ACA Sports) League Cup: 2012–13
