= 2025–26 East of Scotland Football League =

East of Scotland Football League
- Season: 2025–26
- Dates: 26 July 2025 – 16 May 2026
- Champions: Hill of Beath Hawthorn

The 2025–26 East of Scotland Football League was the 97th season of the East of Scotland Football League, and the 12th season with its top division as part of the sixth tier of the Scottish football pyramid system.

From the 2026–27 season, a new Lowland Football League structure is being introduced with two divisions each of 16 member clubs (plus any B teams) running concurrently known as Lowland League East and Lowland League West. As a result, the 2025-26 season was a transitional season with three teams from the Premier Division promoted to Lowland League East.

Hill of Beath Hawthorn won the East of Scotland Football League for the first time, finishing a point clear of Musselburgh Athletic, with Dunipace a further point behind in third; all three teams were promoted to the Lowland League East.

== Background ==
At the Lowland Football League AGM in May 2025, a new league structure was announced to be introduced from the 2026–27 season. The league is transitioning into two parallel divisions to be known as Lowland League East and Lowland League West. Membership would be based on geographic boundaries with the East of Scotland Football League and the Midlands Football League becoming feeder leagues for Lowland League East. To fill league membership up to 16 teams plus one guest team, four teams were promoted from the 2025–26 East of Scotland Football League Premier Division and the 2025–26 Midlands Football League Premier Division. Priority was given to the highest-ranked eligible clubs. To be eligible, a club must be club licensed with the Scottish Football Association.

A new club, Cowdenbeath Central, was admitted to the league.

Peebles Rovers withdrew from the league following issues around the compliance of their ground, Whitestone Park.

== Premier Division ==
East of Scotland Football League Premier Division
- Season: 2025–26
- Dates: 26 July 2025 – 9 May 2026
- Champions: Hill of Beath Hawthorn
- Promoted: Dunipace; Hill of Beath Hawthorn; Musselburgh Athletic
- Relegated: Glenrothes; Hutchison Vale
- Matches: 240
- Goals: 808 (3.37 per match)
- Top goalscorer: Jordan Smith (Musselburgh Athletic); (24 goals)
- Biggest home win: Whitburn 8–1 Hutchison Vale (29 July 2025); St Andrews United 7–0 Hutchison Vale (2 August 2025); Camelon Juniors 7–0 Hutchison Vale (21 March 2026)
- Biggest away win: Hutchison Vale 0–8 Musselburgh Athletic (6 September 2025)
- Highest scoring: Jeanfield Swifts 7–3 Dundonald Bluebell (24 January 2026)
- Longest winning run: 9 matches: Camelon Juniors
- Longest unbeaten run: 10 matches: Camelon Juniors
- Longest winless run: 15 matches: Hutchison Vale
- Longest losing run: 9 matches: Hutchison Vale
- All statistics correct as of 9 May 2026.

Hill of Beath Hawthorn won their first East of Scotland League title, and promotion to the Lowland League East, beating their closest challengers Camelon Juniors 1–0 on 2 May 2026, to hold an unassailable four-point lead into the final round of fixtures.

=== Team changes ===
Defending champions Musselburgh Athletic remained in the league after losing the Lowland League play-off against Clydebank. Edinburgh University, Luncarty and Tynecastle were relegated to the First Division while Camelon Juniors, Bo'ness Athletic and Newtongrange Star were promoted.

=== Stadia and locations ===
Club	Location	Ground	Surface	Capacity	Seats	Floodlit	Ref.
Bo'ness Athletic ^{[SFA]}	Bo'ness	Newtown Park	Artificial	2,000	0	Yes	
Camelon Juniors ^{[SFA]}	Camelon	Carmuirs Park	Grass	2,000	100	Yes	
Dunbar United ^{[SFA]}	Dunbar	New Countess Park	Grass	1,200	200	Yes	
Dundonald Bluebell ^{[SFA]}	Cardenden	Moorside Park	Grass	1,000	0	Yes	
Dunipace ^{[SFA]}	Denny	Westfield Park	Artificial	1,000	0	Yes	
Glenrothes	Glenrothes	Warout Stadium	Grass	2,000	730	No	
Haddington Athletic ^{[SFA]}	Haddington	Millfield Park	Grass	1,200	154	Yes	
Hill of Beath Hawthorn ^{[SFA]}	Hill of Beath	Keir's Park	Grass	1,080	0	Yes	
Hutchison Vale ^{[SFA]}	Saughton, Edinburgh	Saughton Enclosure	Grass	1,000	0	Yes	
Jeanfield Swifts ^{[SFA]}	Perth	Riverside Stadium	Grass	1,000	0	Yes	
Musselburgh Athletic ^{[SFA]}	Musselburgh	Olivebank Stadium	Grass	1,500	0	Yes	
Newtongrange Star ^{[SFA]}	Newtongrange	New Victoria Park	Grass	2,275	30	Yes	
Penicuik Athletic ^{[SFA]}	Penicuik	Montgomery Park	Grass	1,500	0	Yes	
Sauchie Juniors ^{[SFA]}	Sauchie	Beechwood Park	Grass	2,500	200	Yes	
St Andrews United ^{[SFA]}	St Andrews	Recreation Park	Grass	766	0	Yes	
Whitburn	Whitburn	Central Park	Grass	3,000	38	Yes	

Location of teams in 2025–26 East of Scotland Football League Premier Division

=== League table ===
Pos	Team	Pld	W	D	L	GF	GA	GD	Pts	Promotion, qualification or relegation
1	Hill of Beath Hawthorn (C, P)	30	22	1	7	87	36	+51	67	Promotion to Lowland League East
2	Musselburgh Athletic (P)	30	21	3	6	58	23	+35	66	Promotion to Lowland League East
3	Dunipace (P)	30	20	5	5	74	29	+45	65	Promotion to Lowland League East
4	Camelon Juniors	30	19	5	6	71	34	+37	62	
5	Jeanfield Swifts	30	18	5	7	68	31	+37	59	
6	Bo'ness Athletic	30	15	6	9	51	41	+10	51	Resigning from the league
7	Haddington Athletic	30	14	6	10	51	33	+18	48	
8	Dunbar United	30	13	5	12	37	35	+2	44	
9	Penicuik Athletic	30	14	2	14	46	48	−2	44	
10	St Andrews United	30	13	4	13	52	55	−3	43	
11	Newtongrange Star	30	9	3	18	42	63	−21	30	
12	Whitburn	30	8	5	17	53	69	−16	29	
13	Dundonald Bluebell	30	8	5	17	31	64	−33	29	
14	Sauchie Juniors	30	5	6	19	32	77	−45	21	
15	Glenrothes (R)	30	4	3	23	33	64	−31	15	Relegation to the First Division
16	Hutchison Vale (Note: Hutchison Vale deducted 3 points for fielding an ineligible player in their 0–7 defeat against St Andrews United on 2 August.) (R)	30	4	2	24	22	106	−84	11	Relegation to the First Division

Rules for classification: 1) Points; 2) Goal difference; 3) Goals scored
(C) Champions; (P) Promoted; (R) Relegated

=== Results ===
Home \ Away	BOA	CAM	DNB	DBL	DPC	GLE	HAD	HOB	HUT	JFS	MUS	NGS	PEN	SAU	STA	WHB
Bo'ness Athletic		0–3	0–3	5–1	2–3	1–0	0–0	2–0	2–0	1–0	2–3	4–2	1–0	2–0	2–3	1–0
Camelon Juniors	1–3		3–0	4–1	1–1	3–0	0–2	3–6	7–0	2–0	0–0	3–0	2–1	1–2	1–1	2–1
Dunbar United	2–0	0–0		2–0	1–2	3–0	1–2	0–1	1–2	1–1	0–1	4–1	0–4	2–0	1–0	1–0
Dundonald Bluebell	1–1	1–3	1–1		0–6	1–0	1–1	1–7	2–1	0–1	1–3	2–0	1–2	1–1	0–1	0–5
Dunipace	1–1	1–2	2–0	0–0		3–0	1–0	2–0	6–1	3–1	2–0	1–0	4–0	3–2	4–0	4–1
Glenrothes	2–7	0–1	0–1	1–0	1–2		0–1	2–3	1–2	0–4	1–2	1–2	2–4	0–1	2–3	5–2
Haddington Athletic	5–0	2–2	1–3	2–1	3–2	1–1		0–1	6–0	1–3	0–2	1–3	3–0	5–0	0–0	3–1
Hill of Beath Hawthorn	4–1	1–0	3–1	2–0	2–2	5–0	1–2		7–1	2–5	4–0	2–1	3–1	4–0	4–0	5–1
Hutchison Vale	0–2	2–3	1–2	1–3	0–4	0–0	0–2	0–7		2–2	0–8	1–2	1–4	0–3	1–0	3–2
Jeanfield Swifts	0–1	2–3	1–1	7–3	3–1	3–1	1–0	2–0	2–0		0–3	6–1	4–0	5–0	2–3	1–1
Musselburgh Athletic	2–2	1–2	2–1	3–0	2–1	1–0	1–0	1–0	3–0	0–1		3–0	1–2	1–0	3–1	1–0
Newtongrange Star	1–2	0–3	3–1	0–2	0–2	2–2	1–2	1–3	4–1	0–2	1–0		3–5	1–1	1–1	5–1
Penicuik Athletic	0–3	1–3	0–1	1–3	0–3	1–0 (Note: Match initially finished 1–0 to Glenrothes; awarded 1–0 to Penicuik Athletic as Glenrothes fielded an ineligible player.)	1–0	4–1	1–0	0–0	1–2	2–1		0–0	1–3	3–0
Sauchie Juniors	0–0	0–7	1–1	0–1	0–5	2–5	2–1	2–3	5–1	0–4	0–4	1–2	0–5		2–3	2–4
St Andrews United	3–2	0–2	0–1	1–2	5–2	3–2	2–2	1–3	7–0	1–2	0–4	3–2	1–2	2–1		3–2
Whitburn	1–1	5–4	3–1	2–1	1–1	0–4	2–3	0–3	8–1	0–3	1–1	1–2	2–0	4–4	2–1	

Legend: Blue = home team win; Yellow = draw; Red = away team win.

== First Division ==
East of Scotland Football League First Division
- Season: 2025–26
- Dates: 26 July 2025 – 16 May 2026
- Champions: Armadale Thistle
- Promoted: Armadale Thistle; Blackburn United; Edinburgh South; Edinburgh University; Preston Athletic; Thornton Hibs
- Relegated: Luncarty; Tynecastle
- Matches: 240
- Goals: 852 (3.55 per match)
- Top goalscorer: Craig Baillie (Armadale Thistle); (26 goals)
- Biggest home win: Edinburgh University 10–0 Easthouses Lily Miners Welfare (24 January 2026)
- Biggest away win: Luncarty 0–6 Preston Athletic (18 October 2025); Leith Athletic 0–6 Preston Athletic (9 May 2026)
- Highest scoring: Armadale Thistle 5–7 Edinburgh South (2 May 2026)
- Longest winning run: 9 matches: Armadale Thistle
- Longest unbeaten run: 10 matches: Armadale Thistle
- Longest winless run: 24 matches: Luncarty
- Longest losing run: 11 matches: Luncarty
- All statistics correct as of 16 May 2026.

Armadale Thistle won the First Division title on 25 April 2026; their 4–0 victory at Blackburn United allowed them to maintain a ten-point lead over second-placed Thornton Hibs with three games remaining.

=== Team changes ===
Defending champions Camelon Juniors were promoted to the Premier Division alongside Bo'ness Athletic and Newtongrange Star while Arniston Rangers, Kinnoull and Inverkeithing Hillfield Swifts were relegated to the Second Division. In their place, Tynecastle, Edinburgh University and Luncarty were relegated from the Premier Division and Armadale Thistle, Easthouses Lily Miners Welfare and Bathgate Thistle were promoted from the Second Division.

=== Stadia and locations ===
Team	Location	Home ground	Surface	Capacity	Seats	Floodlit	Ref.
Armadale Thistle	Armadale	Volunteer Park	Artificial	2,000	300	Yes	
Bathgate Thistle	Bathgate	Creamery Park	Grass	2,000	0	Yes	
Blackburn United ^{[SFA]}	Blackburn	New Murrayfield Park	Artificial	1,100	60	Yes	
Crossgates Primrose	Crossgates	Humbug Park	Grass	1,500	0	No	
Easthouses Lily Miners Welfare ^{[SFA]}	Easthouses	Newbattle Complex	Grass	1,500	100	Yes	
Edinburgh South	Colinton, Edinburgh	Paties Road Stadium (Note: Edinburgh South ground-shared with Edinburgh United.)	Grass	1,200	200	No	
Edinburgh University ^{[SFA]}	Craigmillar, Edinburgh	New Peffermill Stadium	Grass	1,100	100	Yes	
Heriot-Watt University	Riccarton, Edinburgh	John Brydson Arena	Artificial	500	0	Yes	
Kirkcaldy & Dysart	Kirkcaldy	Denfield Park	Grass	1,200	20	No	
Leith Athletic	Meadowbank, Edinburgh	Meadowbank Stadium	Artificial	1,748	499	Yes	
Lochore Welfare	Crosshill	Central Park	Grass	1,200	0	No	
Luncarty	Luncarty	Brownlands Park	Grass	1,000	0	No	
Preston Athletic ^{[SFA]}	Prestonpans	Pennypit Park	Grass	1,500	313	Yes	
Thornton Hibs	Thornton	Memorial Park	Grass	1,500	0	No	
Tynecastle ^{[SFA]}	Slateford, Edinburgh	Meggetland Sports Complex	Grass	3,000	500	Yes	
Whitehill Welfare ^{[SFA]}	Rosewell	Ferguson Park	Grass	1,500	192	Yes	

Notes

Location of teams in 2025–26 East of Scotland Football League First Division
Location of teams in 2025–26 East of Scotland Football League First Division

=== League table ===
Pos	Team	Pld	W	D	L	GF	GA	GD	Pts	Promotion or relegation
1	Armadale Thistle (C, P)	30	22	3	5	82	35	+47	69	Promotion to the Premier Division
2	Thornton Hibs (P)	30	19	3	8	57	38	+19	60	Promotion to the Premier Division
3	Edinburgh South (P)	30	19	2	9	71	49	+22	59	Promotion to the Premier Division
4	Preston Athletic (P)	30	18	3	9	57	37	+20	57	Promotion to the Premier Division
5	Blackburn United (P)	30	16	2	12	49	49	0	50	Promotion to the Premier Division
6	Edinburgh University (P)	30	14	5	11	80	58	+22	47	Promotion to the Premier Division
7	Kirkcaldy & Dysart	30	13	5	12	49	51	−2	44	
8	Leith Athletic	30	11	7	12	61	58	+3	40	
9	Lochore Welfare	30	12	4	14	49	54	−5	40	
10	Crossgates Primrose (Note: Crossgates Primrose deducted 2 points for fielding an ineligible player in their 0–0 draw against Blackburn United on 21 February; the match was later awarded 1–0 to Blackburn United.)	30	11	5	14	46	48	−2	36	
11	Bathgate Thistle	30	9	7	14	37	51	−14	34	
12	Whitehill Welfare (Note: Whitehill Welfare deducted 3 points for fielding an ineligible player in their 2–4 defeat against Edinburgh South on 7 March.)	30	10	6	14	45	57	−12	33	
13	Easthouses Lily Miners Welfare (Note: Easthouses Lily Miners Welfare deducted 3 points for fielding an ineligible player in their 0–3 defeat against Tynecastle on 11 October.)	30	11	3	16	50	72	−22	33	
14	Heriot-Watt University	30	9	5	16	45	63	−18	32	
15	Tynecastle (R)	30	9	4	17	36	51	−15	31	Relegation to the Second Division Conference SE
16	Luncarty (R)	30	2	6	22	39	82	−43	12	Relegation to the Second Division Conference NW

Rules for classification: 1) Points; 2) Goal difference; 3) Number of goals scored
(C) Champions; (P) Promoted; (R) Relegated

=== Results ===
Home \ Away	ARM	BAT	BLU	CRS	ELM	EDS	EDU	HER	KDY	LEI	LOW	LUN	PRE	THO	TYN	WHI
Armadale Thistle		5–0	1–2	5–1	0–2	5–7	6–1	1–0	2–0	5–3	1–0	5–1	6–0	4–2	1–0	2–1
Bathgate Thistle	0–3		2–1	0–2	1–2	3–4	1–1	1–0	2–3	2–2	3–4	1–1	0–1	1–0	0–2	0–0
Blackburn United	0–4	4–1		1–2	4–3	0–2	2–1	3–1	0–0	1–2	1–2	1–0	0–1	2–1	2–3	1–4
Crossgates Primrose	1–2	0–2	0–1 (Note: Match initially finished 0–0; later awarded 1–0 to Blackburn United as Crossgates Primrose fielded an ineligible player.)		2–0	0–3	0–1	0–1	5–2	2–1	1–3	5–2	3–0	0–4	2–0	1–1
Easthouses Lily Miners Welfare	1–2	2–4	3–2	1–1		3–0	2–1	2–0	2–0	5–4	3–5	4–1	2–4	1–1	0–3	2–2
Edinburgh South	3–3	0–1	0–1	3–2	5–2		3–2	1–2	0–1	0–2	2–1	3–2	3–0	0–1	2–1	3–0
Edinburgh University	2–1	2–4	5–1	1–0	10–0	3–5		2–1	3–4	1–1	6–0	7–1	0–1	6–3	2–0	3–1
Heriot-Watt University	1–5	2–0	1–4	4–4	3–0	3–4	2–2		0–3	1–4	2–2	1–1	1–3	0–3	0–1	1–0
Kirkcaldy & Dysart	4–1	1–1	1–2	2–2	2–0	0–1	2–2	2–3		1–2	2–1	1–0	4–3	1–2	2–0	2–1
Leith Athletic	1–2	2–2	1–3	1–2	2–0	1–2	6–1	2–2	2–2		2–0	4–3	0–6	3–0	2–3	2–2
Lochore Welfare	0–1	1–1	4–0	0–2	2–1	3–2	1–1	3–4	3–1	4–1		2–2	2–1	2–1	1–0	1–2
Luncarty	0–1	0–2	1–3	1–3	1–2	2–2	1–3	3–1	1–2	2–4	4–2		0–6	0–2	1–3	3–5
Preston Athletic	0–0	1–0	2–2	1–0	3–0	2–1	3–1	2–1	4–0	1–0	3–0	1–1		1–4	1–3	4–0
Thornton Hibs	1–1	2–0	1–2	2–1	3–1	1–2	3–2	2–0	3–1	2–1	1–0	3–2	1–0		3–1	2–1
Tynecastle	0–5	0–1	0–1	0–0	2–3	0–4	2–4	2–3	1–3	1–1	2–0	1–1	0–2	0–1		2–0
Whitehill Welfare	1–2	3–1	0–2	3–2	2–1	2–4	1–4	1–4	2–0	0–2	1–0	2–1	2–0	2–2	3–3	

Legend: Blue = home team win; Yellow = draw; Red = away team win.

== Second Division ==
East of Scotland Football League Second Division
- Season: 2025–26
- Dates: 26 July 2025 – 16 May 2026
- Champions: West Calder United
- Promoted: Coldstream; Kennoway Star Hearts; Kinnoull; Lochgelly Albert; Oakley United; West Calder United
- Matches: 210
- Goals: 819 (3.9 per match)
- Top goalscorer: Finlay Shearer (Inverkeithing Hillfield Swifts); (31 goals)
- Biggest home win: Oakley United 8–0 Edinburgh College (4 October 2025)
- Biggest away win: Edinburgh College 0–9 Lochgelly Albert (2 August 2025)
- Highest scoring: West Calder United 5–5 Inverkeithing Hillfield Swifts (2 August 2025); Coldstream 6–4 Harthill Royal (1 November 2025)
- Longest winning run: 9 matches: Coldstream
- Longest unbeaten run: 13 matches: West Calder United
- Longest winless run: 11 matches: Stirling University reserves
- Longest losing run: 8 matches: Harthill Royal
- All statistics correct as of 16 May 2026.

The Second Division title went down to the final round of matches, with West Calder United ultimately winning the championship by two points ahead of Coldstream.

Following the end of the season, the Second and Third Divisions were amalgamated into geographical conferences by region, with Stirling University reserves being reprieved from relegation.

=== Team changes ===
Defending champions Armadale Thistle were promoted to the First Division alongside Easthouses Lily Miners Welfare and Bathgate Thistle while Vale of Leithen and Tweedmouth Rangers were relegated to the Third Division. In their place, Arniston Rangers, Kinnoull and Inverkeithing Hillfield Swifts were relegated from the First Division and Lochgelly Albert, Linton Hotspur and Fauldhouse United were promoted from the Third Division. Peebles Rovers withdrew from the league.

=== Stadia and locations ===
Team	Location	Home ground	Surface	Capacity	Seats	Floodlit	Ref
Arniston Rangers	Gorebridge	Newbyres Park	Grass	1,500	0	No	
Burntisland Shipyard ^{[SFA]}	Burntisland	Recreation Park	Grass	1,000	0	No	
Coldstream ^{[SFA]}	Coldstream	Home Park	Grass	1,000	0	Yes	
Dalkeith Thistle ^{[SFA]}	Dalkeith	King's Park	Grass	1,500	0	Yes	
Edinburgh College	Riccarton, Edinburgh	John Brydson Arena (Note: Edinburgh College ground-shared with Heriot-Watt University.)	Artificial	500	0	Yes	
Fauldhouse United	Fauldhouse	Park View	Grass	1,500	0	No	
Harthill Royal	Harthill	Gibbshill Park	Grass	1,000	0	No	
Inverkeithing Hillfield Swifts	Dalgety Bay	Dalgety Bay Sports & Leisure Centre	Artificial	800	0	Yes	
Kennoway Star Hearts	Star	Treaton Park	Grass	1,000	0	Yes	
Kinnoull	Perth	Tulloch Park	Grass	1,000	0	Yes	
Linton Hotspur	West Linton	New Moor Park	Grass	1,000	63	No	
Lochgelly Albert	Lochgelly	Gardiners Park	Grass	1,500	0	No	
Oakley United	Oakley	Blairwood Park	Grass	1,500	0	No	
Stirling University reserves	Alloa	Recreation Park (Note: Stirling University reserves ground-shared with Alloa Athletic.)	Artificial	3,100	919	Yes	
West Calder United	West Calder	Hermand Park	Grass	1,000	0	No	

Notes

Location of teams in 2025–26 East of Scotland Football League Second Division

=== League table ===
Pos	Team	Pld	W	D	L	GF	GA	GD	Pts	Promotion or relegation
1	West Calder United (C, P)	28	18	4	6	76	44	+32	58	Promotion to the First Division
2	Coldstream (P)	28	17	5	6	83	44	+39	56	Promotion to the First Division
3	Oakley United (P)	28	14	6	8	61	40	+21	48	Promotion to the First Division
4	Kinnoull (P)	28	14	5	9	66	49	+17	47	Promotion to the First Division
5	Kennoway Star Hearts (P)	28	13	7	8	62	47	+15	46	Promotion to the First Division
6	Lochgelly Albert (P)	28	13	5	10	55	51	+4	44	Promotion to the First Division
7	Dalkeith Thistle	28	13	3	12	49	48	+1	42	Transfer to the Second Division Conference SE
8	Arniston Rangers	28	11	7	10	49	52	−3	40	Transfer to the Second Division Conference SE
9	Inverkeithing Hillfield Swifts	28	10	7	11	60	59	+1	37	Transfer to the Second Division Conference NW
10	Linton Hotspur	28	9	8	11	48	56	−8	35	Transfer to the Second Division Conference SE
11	Harthill Royal (Note: Harthill Royal deducted 2 points for fielding an ineligible player in their game against Lochgelly Albert on 24 January – originally a 3–3 draw, the game was awarded 1–0 to Lochgelly Albert.)	28	10	4	14	49	57	−8	32	Transfer to the Second Division Conference NW
12	Burntisland Shipyard	28	9	4	15	48	57	−9	31	Transfer to the Second Division Conference NW
13	Edinburgh College	28	10	1	17	45	86	−41	31	Transfer to the Second Division Conference SE
14	Fauldhouse United	28	6	6	16	34	55	−21	24	Transfer to the Second Division Conference NW
15	Stirling University reserves	28	6	2	20	34	74	−40	20	Transfer to the Second Division Conference NW

Rules for classification: 1) Points; 2) Goal difference; 3) Number of goals scored
(C) Champions; (P) Promoted

=== Results ===
Home \ Away	ARN	BUR	COL	DAL	EDC	FAU	HAR	IHS	KSH	KIN	LIN	LOC	OAK	STU	WCU
Arniston Rangers		2–2	2–1	0–0	2–3	1–2	3–1	3–1	3–0	3–2	0–3	0–2	1–3	2–0	4–3
Burntisland Shipyard	4–2		1–5	3–1	3–1	2–2	3–0	0–1	4–2	1–3	2–2	1–2	3–5	2–1	0–2
Coldstream	5–1	2–0		4–1	4–0	4–0	6–4	3–4	4–3	5–1	4–1	4–2	1–3	4–3	3–1
Dalkeith Thistle	3–0	3–0	3–0		3–0	0–2	3–0	2–1	1–3	2–1	1–3	4–0	1–0	5–1	2–6
Edinburgh College	1–3	2–0 (Note: Match played at Ainslie Park.)	0–5	6–0		1–0	6–1	5–4	0–7	2–4	3–1	0–9	0–4	3–1	0–4
Fauldhouse United	1–4	2–1	1–1	0–1	2–1		2–2	0–0	0–2	0–6	2–2	3–0	2–5	5–3	1–2
Harthill Royal	1–0	4–0	2–4	2–2	3–4	1–0		1–0	1–4	4–0	4–0	3–1	0–1	3–1	2–3
Inverkeithing Hillfield Swifts	2–2	2–3	3–3	3–2	1–0	2–1	0–4		0–1	4–0	2–3	5–1	2–2	3–2	1–2
Kennoway Star Hearts	1–1	3–2	1–1	4–2	5–1	2–1	1–2	2–2		1–2	2–2	3–1	0–0	0–3	4–1
Kinnoull	4–1	4–2	0–0	4–3	2–3	4–2	5–0	2–2	1–2		3–3	1–1	1–1	4–0	2–0
Linton Hotspur	1–1	0–1	3–1	3–1	3–2	2–1	1–0	5–3	1–1	0–4		1–1	0–2	1–2	1–2
Lochgelly Albert	4–1	0–6	1–1	0–0	3–1	2–0	1–0 (Note: Match originally finished 3–3; match awarded 1–0 to Lochgelly Albert, as Harthill Royal fielded an ineligible player.)	1–4	5–1	0–2	4–1		3–2	6–2	1–3
Oakley United	0–1	1–1	0–2	0–1	8–0	1–0	2–2	2–0	1–4	3–2	3–2	1–1		5–1	0–3
Stirling University reserves	1–4	1–0	0–5	1–2	0–0	1–0	2–0	2–3	1–1	1–2	1–0	0–1	1–6		0–3
West Calder United	2–2	2–1	3–1	1–0	4–0	2–3	2–2	5–5	4–2	3–0	3–3	1–2	5–0	4–2	

Legend: Blue = home team win; Yellow = draw; Red = away team win.

== Third Division ==
East of Scotland Football League Third Division
- Season: 2025–26
- Dates: 26 July 2025 – 16 May 2026
- Champions: Hawick Royal Albert
- Promoted: All teams
- Matches: 165
- Goals: 641 (3.88 per match)
- Top goalscorer: Andrew McCallion (Newburgh); (26 goals)
- Biggest home win: Hawick Royal Albert 9–1 Edinburgh CFC (4 April 2026)
- Biggest away win: Ormiston Primrose 0–6 Hawick Royal Albert (8 November 2025); Tweedmouth Rangers 0–6 Edinburgh United (21 February 2026)
- Highest scoring: Newburgh 4–7 Edinburgh United (20 September 2025)
- Longest winning run: 8 matches: Stoneyburn
- Longest unbeaten run: 8 matches: Livingston United & Stoneyburn
- Longest winless run: 15 matches: Edinburgh CFC
- Longest losing run: 14 matches: Edinburgh CFC
- All statistics correct as of 16 May 2026.

Hawick Royal Albert won the Third Division title on 5 May 2026, following a 2–0 win over Vale of Leithen, which allowed them to retain an eight-point lead over second-placed Stoneyburn with two games remaining. It was their first league title of any kind since winning the East of Scotland League in 1973–74.

Following the end of the season, the Second and Third Divisions were amalgamated into geographical conferences by region, with all teams being promoted as a result.

=== Team changes ===
Defending champions Lochgelly Albert were promoted to the Second Division alongside Linton Hotspur and Fauldhouse United. In their place, Vale of Leithen and Tweedmouth Rangers were relegated from the Second Division Previously a youth team known as Blue Brazil, Cowdenbeath Central joined the East of Scotland League after setting up a senior side.

=== Stadia and locations ===
Club	Location	Home Ground	Surface	Capacity	Seats	Floodlit	Ref.
Cowdenbeath Central	Cowdenbeath	Alex Venters Memorial Park	Grass	500	0	No	
Edinburgh CFC	Warriston, Edinburgh	St Mark's Park	Grass	1,000	0	No	
Edinburgh United	Colinton, Edinburgh	Paties Road Stadium	Grass	1,200	200	No	
Hawick Royal Albert ^{[SFA]}	Hawick	Albert Park	Grass	1,000	500	Yes	
Livingston United	Livingston	Station Park	Grass	1,500	0	No	
Newburgh	Newburgh	East Shore Park	Grass	1,000	0	No	
Ormiston Primrose	Ormiston	New Recreation Park	Grass	1,000	0	No	
Pumpherston	Pumpherston	Recreation Park	Grass	1,500	0	No	
Stoneyburn	Stoneyburn	Beechwood Park	Grass	1,500	0	No	
Tweedmouth Rangers ^{[SFA]}	Berwick-upon-Tweed	Old Shielfield Park	Grass	1,000	50	No	
Vale of Leithen ^{[SFA]}	Innerleithen	Victoria Park	Grass	1,000	0	Yes	

Location of teams in 2025–26 East of Scotland Football League Third Division

=== League table ===
Pos	Team	Pld	W	D	L	GF	GA	GD	Pts	Promotion
1	Hawick Royal Albert (C)	30	20	1	9	73	43	+30	61	Promoted to the Second Division Conference SE
2	Edinburgh United	30	18	3	9	72	42	+30	57	Promoted to the Second Division Conference SE
3	Stoneyburn	30	17	2	11	68	53	+15	53	Promoted to the Second Division Conference NW
4	Livingston United	30	16	4	10	68	49	+19	52	Promoted to the Second Division Conference NW
5	Pumpherston	30	15	6	9	62	46	+16	51	Promoted to the Second Division Conference NW
6	Newburgh	30	15	4	11	70	61	+9	49	Promoted to the Second Division Conference NW
7	Cowdenbeath Central	30	14	5	11	63	44	+19	47	Promoted to the Second Division Conference NW
8	Vale of Leithen	30	12	6	12	51	42	+9	42	Promoted to the Second Division Conference SE
9	Tweedmouth Rangers	30	12	4	14	50	59	−9	40	Promoted to the Second Division Conference SE
10	Ormiston Primrose	30	2	4	24	35	94	−59	10	Promoted to the Second Division Conference SE
11	Edinburgh CFC (Note: Edinburgh CFC deducted 14 points for fielding an ineligible player in their defeats against Hawick Royal Albert (1–3; 11 October), Livingston United (1–3; 18 October and 0–7; 2 May) and Tweedmouth Rangers (2–4; 25 October). A 0–0 draw against Pumpherston on 18 April was later awarded 1–0 to Pumpherston.)	30	3	3	24	29	108	−79	−2	Promoted to the Second Division Conference SE

Rules for classification: 1) Points; 2) Goal difference; 3) Number of goals scored
(C) Champions

=== Results ===
Home \ Away	COW	ECF	EDN	HAW	LIV	NEW	ORM	PUM	STO	TWE	VOL
Cowdenbeath Central		4–0	1–0	0–2	2–1	3–4	7–0	1–1	4–2	3–1	3–0
Cowdenbeath Central			1–1	2–1	2–2	1–2					0–0
Edinburgh CFC	1–4		0–1	2–3	2–6	1–4	2–1	4–3	0–3	1–2	1–1
Edinburgh CFC	1–3						2–2	0–1 (Note: Match initially finished 0–0; awarded 1–0 to Pumpherston as Edinburgh CFC fielded an ineligible player.)	1–6	2–4	
Edinburgh United	1–1	4–0		1–0	3–2	4–2	2–1	2–3	0–1	2–2	3–2
Edinburgh United		6–0			0–2		3–0		1–0	3–0	
Hawick Royal Albert	2–1	3–1	1–0		0–2	2–1	3–0	2–4	2–3	3–1	2–1
Hawick Royal Albert		9–1	1–5		0–5	1–3					2–0
Livingston United	1–5	3–1	3–0	4–2		2–2	4–3	0–3	1–3	1–0	3–2
Livingston United		7–0					5–2	0–0	2–1	1–0	
Newburgh	4–1	2–2	4–7	4–5	4–1		4–1	3–1	3–2	1–3	3–2
Newburgh		4–0	2–7		1–0				1–2		2–1
Ormiston Primrose	1–3	1–3	1–2	0–3	0–4	0–3		3–3	5–3	1–6	0–2
Ormiston Primrose	1–2			0–6		3–3		1–3		4–1	
Pumpherston	2–1	7–0	2–3	1–5	1–1	2–0	0–0		2–3	5–2	3–2
Pumpherston	2–1		1–2	0–2		2–1					0–3
Stoneyburn	1–3	5–0	3–2	0–4	0–1	3–1	2–1	1–0		4–2	0–2
Stoneyburn	5–2			1–1			4–1	0–3		3–5	
Tweedmouth Rangers	1–0	6–1	0–6	0–2	2–0	1–0	2–1	0–2	1–1		1–0
Tweedmouth Rangers	2–1			0–3		0–1		2–4			2–2
Vale of Leithen	2–1	2–0	3–1	0–1	6–3	1–1	4–0	1–1	1–2	1–1	
Vale of Leithen		1–0	3–0		2–1		3–1		3–1		

Legend: Blue = home team win; Yellow = draw; Red = away team win.

== Notes ==
^{SFA} Club with an SFA licence eligible for promotion to Lowland League East (should they participate in the Premier Division) and also compete in the Scottish Cup.
