= Stoneyburn F.C. =

Association football club in Scotland

Stoneyburn
- Full name: Stoneyburn Junior Football Club
- Nickname: The Fulshie
- Founded: 1983
- Ground: Beechwood Park; Strathyre Drive; Stoneyburn
- Capacity: 3,500
- Coordinates: 55°50′57″N 3°37′52″W
- President: David Macmillan
- Manager: Allan Fleming
- League: East of Scotland League Second Division
- 2025–26: East of Scotland League Third Division, 3rd of 11 (promoted)
- Website: https://wosfl.co.uk/team/stoneyburn/
Home colours	Away colours

Stoneyburn Junior Football Club are a Scottish football club based in Stoneyburn, near Bathgate, West Lothian. They currently play in the East of Scotland Football League. Their home ground is Beechwood Park.

The original Stoneyburn club were founded in 1928 and enjoyed fair success in the 1930s and 1940s. The club reached the Scottish Junior Cup semi-finals in 1950, where they finally lost 4–2 after a second replay to eventual winners Blantyre Victoria, and won the Midlothian Junior League in 1934–35 and 1938–39. During this era, the club built up the ground at Beechwood Park using spoil material from the nearby Foulshiels Colliery, after which their nickname, the Fulshie is derived. Despite some record crowds in this era of 12,000 for big cup matches, the club hit hard times and folded in 1958. The current side joined the SJFA in 1983 after some years in the Juvenile and Amateur levels.

The SJFA restructured prior to the 2006–07 season, and Stoneyburn found themselves in the 15-team East Region, South Division. They finished 13th in their first season in the division.

The team is managed by Allan Fleming and Jamie Mackay. First team coach is Scott Paterson and first aider Brian Rice.

== Club staff ==
=== Board of directors ===
Role	Name
President	(Scotland) David MacMillan
Secretary	(Scotland) Steve MacMillan
Club Official	(Scotland) Andrew Abbott

=== Coaching staff ===
Role	Name
Manager	(Scotland) Allan Fleming

== Notable former players ==
- Jimmy Delaney – Celtic, Manchester United and Scotland

== Managerial history ==
Name	Nationality	Years
Davie MacMillan	(Scotland)	1992-?
Robin Butler	(Scotland)	2009-2010
Colin Hendry	(Scotland)	2010-?
Richard Hastings	(Scotland)	2012-?
Allan Brown	(Scotland)	2016-?
Allan Fleming	(Scotland)	2018-2020
Steven Sharp	(Scotland)	2020-2023
Allan Fleming	(Scotland)	2023-

^{c} Caretaker manager

¹
