= Kirkcaldy & Dysart F.C. =

Association football club in Fife, Scotland

Kirkcaldy & Dysart
- Full name: Kirkcaldy & Dysart Football Club
- Nickname: YM
- Founded: 1969
- Ground: Bodywyse Autocare Park, Kirkcaldy
- Capacity: 1,200
- Coordinates: 56°7′18″N 3°9′15″W
- Chairman: Scott Jackson
- President: Ramsay Budd
- Manager: Grant Brough
- Coach: Steven Lennen Gregor Rodger
- League: East of Scotland League First Division
- 2025–26: East of Scotland League First Division, 7th of 16
- Website: https://www.kirkcaldydysartfc.co.uk
Home colours	Away colours	Third colours

Kirkcaldy & Dysart Football Club are a Scottish football club based in Kirkcaldy, Fife. The club renamed from Kirkcaldy YM JFC after a merger with Dysart AFC in 2019.

== History ==
Kirkcaldy YM were formed in 1969 as an amateur club, becoming members of the Scottish Junior Football Association in 1970. Their home ground is Bodywyse Autocare Park (previously known as Denfield Park) where they have been based since 1993, although previous grounds included a five-year spell in the village of Coaltown of Wemyss during the 1970s.

The SJFA restructured prior to the 2006–07 season, and Kirkcaldy found themselves in the twelve-team East Region, Central Division, finishing third in their first season in the division. However they pulled out of the 2007–08 campaign due to a shortage of players. A public meeting in February 2008 led to the formation of a new committee and the club re-joined the Central Division for the 2008–09 season.

YM gained promotion to the East Region Premier League for 2013–14, the second tier of the East Region, before immediately dropping back down to the North Division. They finished bottom of the South Division in 2016–17 and 2017–18, only managing to score a single point in the latter season.

In 2019 Kirkcaldy YM merged with Dysart as part of the Kirkcaldy Community Football Partnership, which includes a football pathway along with Kirkcaldy FC and Templehall United.

In May 2020, the club confirmed they had successfully applied to join the East of Scotland Football League within the senior pyramid.
