= Jamie Fairlie =

Scottish footballer

Personal information
- Full name: James Fairlie
- Date of birth: 1 May 1957 (age 69)
- Place of birth: Baillieston, Scotland
- Height: 1.73 m (5 ft 8 in)
- Positions: Midfielder; forward

Youth career
- Calderbank YC

Senior career*
Years	Team	Apps	(Gls)
1974–1983	Hamilton Academical	291	(74)
1983–1986	Airdrieonians	105	(14)
1986–1987	Clydebank	27	(1)
1987	Motherwell	12	(1)
1987–1989	Hamilton Academical	41	(7)
1989–1990	Clyde	32	(3)
- Livingston United
- * Club domestic league appearances and goals as of 2 August 2011

James Fairlie (born 2 August 1957) is a Scottish former footballer.

== Family ==
Fairlie's brother Brian also played senior football, with Albion Rovers.

His daughter Susan Fairlie played football for Hamilton Accies' women's section and was named SWFA Player of the Year in 2010. A police officer, she signed for Celtic in 2011 but returned to Accies during the Scottish Women's Premier League mid–season break.
