= Dunipace F.C. =

Association football club in Scotland

Dunipace
- Full name: Dunipace Football Club
- Nickname: The Pace
- Founded: 1888
- Ground: Westfield Park, Town House Street, Denny
- Coordinates: 56.019851°N 3.904551°W
- Chairman: Paul Garner
- Manager: Danny Smith
- League: Lowland League East
- 2025–26: East of Scotland League Premier Division, 3rd of 16 (promoted)
- Website: http://www.dunipacefootballclub.com/
Home colours	Away colours

Dunipace Football Club are a Scottish football club based in Denny, Stirlingshire. Nicknamed the Pace, they were formed in 1888 and are based at Westfield Park. The team plays in the Lowland League East, having moved from the junior leagues in 2018.

The club won the Scottish Junior Cup in 1905–06, defeating Kirkintilloch Rob Roy 1–0 in a replay at Brockville Park, Falkirk, following a 2–2 draw in the first tie at Meadowside, Partick. Dunipace were also runners-up to Inverkeithing United in the final seven years later.

The club's management team of Danny Smith (Manager), Alan Moffat (Assistant Manager) and Bruce Totten (Coach) was appointed in November 2020. Both Danny & Alan previously had spells as players with the club.

On 27 April 2018 the club announced that it had successfully applied to leave the West Region of junior football and join the East of Scotland League for season 2018–19. As part of the club's move to senior football, its name was changed to reflect this, by dropping the term "Juniors". This was a part of a larger movement of junior clubs to the East of Scotland Football League.

At the start of their first season in senior football, the club's Westfield Park ground was upgraded with an artificial turf surface and floodlights installed, reopening in October 2018. Dunipace won their first trophy as a senior club in August 2021 after defeating Broomhill 3–1 in the delayed final of the 2019–20 South Challenge Cup and were runners-up in two cup the following season.

The club won their first league title in 25 years after securing the East of Scotland League First Division at the end of the 2023–24 season, gaining promotion to the Premier Division. Two years later Dunipace FC secured promotion to the new Scottish Lowland League (East Division), following a third place East of Scotland Premier League finish.

== Honours ==
=== Major honours ===
Scottish Junior Cup

- Winners: 1905–06
- Runners-up: 1912–13

East of Scotland League First Division

- Winners: 2023–24

Central League Division 1

- Runners-up: 2004–05

Central League Division 2

- Winners (3): 1972–73, 1981–82, 1998–99
- Runners-up: 2008–09

SFA South Region Challenge Cup

- Winners: 2019–20

King Cup

- Runners-up: 2022–23

East of Scotland Football League Cup

- Runners-up: 2022–23, 2025-26

=== Other honours ===
- Stirling and District Junior Cup: 1898–99, 1899–90, 1900–91, 1901–02, 1902–03, 1904–05, 1905–06, 1912–13, 1919–20, 1920–21, 1921–22, 1922–23, 1932–33, 1933–34, 1934–35
- Stirlingshire Junior League Winners: 1900–01, 1901–02, 1902–03, 1903–04, 1904–05, 1906–07, 1907–08, 1908–09, 1912–13, 1913–14, 1914–15, 1919–20, 1920–21, 1921–22, 1922–23, 1923–24
- Stirlingshire Junior Cup: 1901–02, 1902–03, 1904–05, 1905–06, 1908–09, 1910–11, 1911–12, 1912–13, 1919–20, 1934–35
- Falkirk & District Junior Cup: 1901–02, 1902–03, 1903–04, 1905–06, 1908–09, 1911–12, 1912–13, 1920–21, 1921–22, 1922–23, 1927–28, 1929–30
- Denny and District Cottage Hospital Shield: 1901–02, 1904–05, 1905–06, 1906–07, 1907–08, 1908–09, 1909–10
- Stirlingshire Charity Cup: 1920–21
- Stirlingshire League Cup: 1920–21, 1921–22, 1922–23, 1923–24, 1926–27
- Scottish Junior League (Eastern) winners: 1927–28
- Victory Cup: 1927–28, 1938–39
- McLeod Trophy: 1972–73
- Centenary Cup: 1987–88
- Central Region Sectional League Cup: 1989–90
- Bert McNab Cup: 1992–93
- Evening Times Cup: 1998–99
