= Scottish Junior Football East Region Premier League South =

- Founded: 2002
- Folded: 2020
- Country: Scotland
- Number of clubs: 10
- Level on pyramid: 2
- Promotion to: East Super League South
- Domestic cup: Scottish Junior Cup
- Last champions: None (2019-20)
- Website: SJFA East Region

The Scottish Junior Football East Region Premier League South also known for sponsorship reasons as the McBookie.com East Premier League South, was the second-tier division of the East Region of the Scottish Junior Football Association and sat parallel with the East Region Premier League North.

The league came into existence under the 'South' name for the 2006–07 season, although a 'Lothian District league' had been in place below the East Super League since 2002–03, using the structure of a common 'East Region' top tier and lower regional divisions in place of the old structure of three separate regional leagues in that part of Scotland, with the East Junior Football League the historic Lothians competition. The South Division was expanded for the start of the 2013–14 season by absorbing the more southerly clubs from the dissolved East Region Central Division as part of league reconstruction in the region.

Between 2006–07 and 2017–18, there was an East Premier League at tier 2 and North and South Divisions at tier 3. The large-scale movement of clubs to the East of Scotland League resulted in the structure being flattened into two tiers. Further league reconstruction for the 2019–20 season split the Super League into North and South divisions, reducing the number of Premier League South teams. For the final season it comprised 10 clubs who were due to play each other three times to give 27 league fixtures prior to the season being cancelled due to the COVID-19 pandemic.

== Final Members ==
Location of teams in 2019-20 Scottish Junior Football East Region Premier League South within Fife
Location of teams in 2019-20 Scottish Junior Football East Region Premier League South within West Lothian

Club	Location	Home Ground	Finishing position 2019-20 (Note: Season suspended in March 2020 due to the coronavirus pandemic, later officially declared null and void with no champion declared. Using 'points per game' algorithm applied in other leagues, Stoneyburn would have been nominal champions.)
Bo'ness United Junior	Bo'ness	Newtown Park	9th
Kirkcaldy & Dysart	Kirkcaldy	Denfield Park	4th
Linlithgow Rose CFC	Linlithgow	Xcite Linlithgow	8th
Lochgelly Albert	Lochgelly	Gardiners Park	6th
Newburgh	Newburgh	East Shore Park	3rd
Rosyth	Rosyth	Fleet Grounds	2nd
Sauchie Juniors CFC	Sauchie	Beechwood Park	5th
Stoneyburn	Stoneyburn	Beechwood Park	1st
Syngenta	Denny	Westfield Park	7th
West Calder United	West Calder	Hermand Park	10th

== Winners ==
- As Lothians District, one of three third-tier divisions:
  - 2002–03: Bo'ness United
  - 2003–04: Camelon Juniors
  - 2004–05: Whitburn
  - 2005–06: Camelon Juniors (2) (Note: Camelon were promoted to the Super League. Runners-up Penicuik Athletic were promoted to the new Premier League, along with Musselburgh Athletic (3rd) and Armadale Thistle (4th).)
- As East Region South, one of three third-tier divisions:
  - 2006–07: Newtongrange Star
  - 2007–08: Fauldhouse United
  - 2008–09: Armadale Thistle
  - 2009–10: Broxburn Athletic
  - 2010–11: Sauchie
  - 2011–12: Dalkeith Thistle
  - 2012–13: Fauldhouse United (2)
- As one of two third-tier divisions:
  - 2013–14: Edinburgh United
  - 2014–15: Haddington Athletic
  - 2015–16: Tranent
  - 2016–17: Dunbar United
  - 2017–18: Pumpherston
- As one of two second-tier divisions:
  - 2018–19: Pumpherston (2)
  - 2019–20: No champion
