= Inverkeithing Hillfield Swifts F.C. =

Association football club in Scotland

The Swifts
- Full name: Inverkeithing Hillfield Swifts Football Club
- Nickname: Swifts
- Founded: 1996
- Ground: Dalgety Bay Sports Centre, Harbour Drive, Dalgety Bay
- Capacity: 800
- Coordinates: 56°2′16″N 3°21′47″W
- Chairman: Scott McDonald
- Manager: Craig Reid
- League: East of Scotland League Second Division
- 2025–26: East of Scotland League Second Division, 9th of 15
- Website: https://www.swiftsfc.com/
Home colours	Away colours

Inverkeithing Hillfield Swifts Football Club are a Scottish football club based in the town of Dalgety Bay, Fife. They compete in the East of Scotland League Second Division, the eight tier of Scottish football, having joined the league with their senior team in 2018.

== History ==
The club was founded in 1996 as Inverkeithing Boys Club, before changing their name to Inverkeithing Blue Brazil a year later on the involvement of former Scotland manager Craig Levein. Their current name was adopted in 2000.

Initially the senior team played at their Ballast Bank ground in Inverkeithing for three years after joining the senior pyramid. However they now play matches at Dalgety Bay Sports & Leisure Centre in the neighbouring town of Dalgety Bay where they moved ahead of the 2021–22 season.

After joining the senior pyramid, Swifts soon gained promotion and spent two seasons in the East of Scotland League Premier Division before consecutive relegations to the Second Division in 2025.

In 2024 Swifts won the East of Scotland Qualifying Cup with a 2–1 win over Dunbar United, their first trophy and also their first cup final.

== Honours ==
East of Scotland Qualifying Cup

- Winners: 2023–24

== Photographs ==
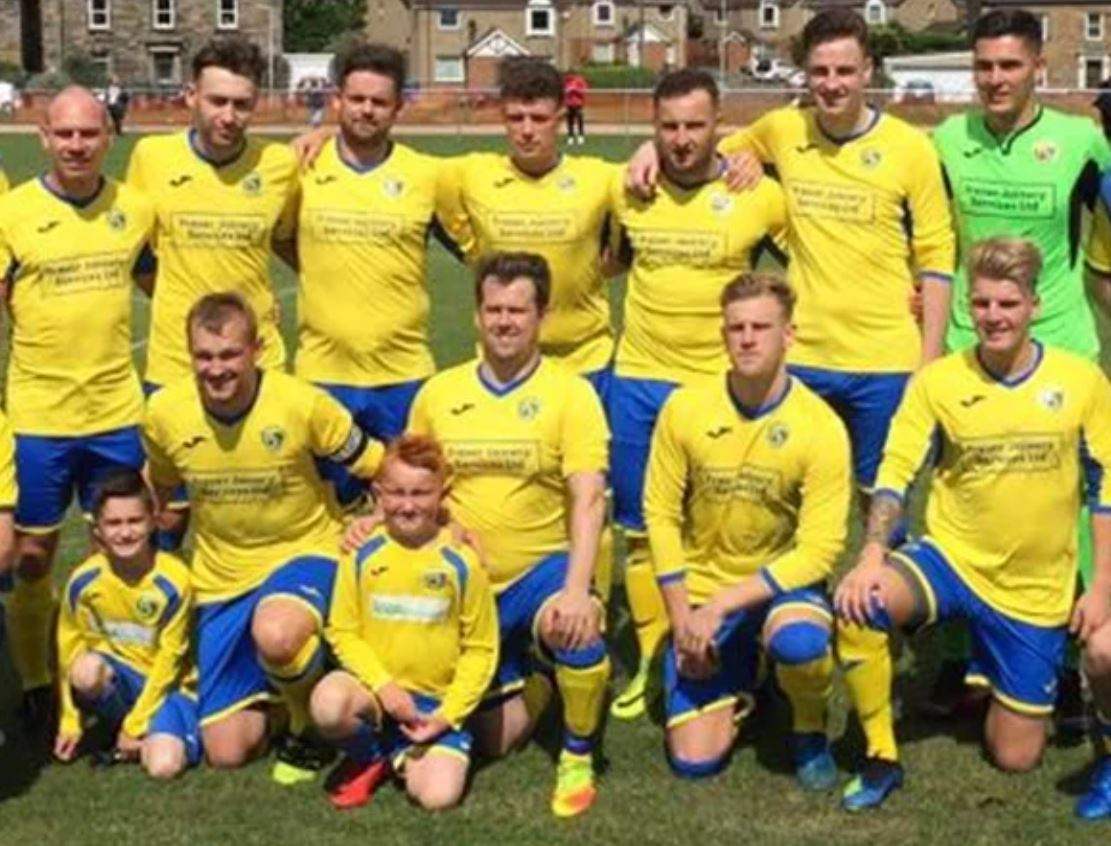
Inverkeithing Hillfield Swifts Squad, 2018.

== See also ==
- Inverkeithing United
