= Dalkeith Thistle F.C. =

Association football club in Scotland

Dalkeith Thistle
- Full name: Dalkeith Thistle Football Club
- Nickname: The Jags
- Founded: 1892
- Ground: King's Park; Croft Street; Dalkeith
- Capacity: 2,000
- Coordinates: 55°53′25″N 3°4′15″W
- Chairman: Barclay Ewing
- Manager: Jock Landells
- League: East of Scotland League Second Division
- 2025–26: East of Scotland League Second Division, 13th of 15
- Website: http://www.dalkeiththistle.co.uk
Home colours	Away colours

Dalkeith Thistle Football Club are a Scottish football club from the town of Dalkeith, Midlothian. Formed in 1892, the team plays in the East of Scotland Football League, having moved from the junior leagues in 2018.

Dalkeith's home strip is black with white trim, while their change strip is navy blue and sky blue.

They play their home matches at King's Park, which has room for roughly 2,000 spectators. The new pavilion was erected in 2007, and floodlights were installed at the ground in 2013. There is also a community and youth wing to the club which operates out of Cowden Park in the town's Woodburn neighbourhood.

From 2020, Edinburgh South groundshared at Dalkeith for two seasons with their newly formed senior team, due to the ground used by their many youth teams in The Inch, Edinburgh not meeting EoSFL requirements.

== Honours ==
- Edinburgh & District League winners: 1931–32, 1955–56, 1960–61
- East Region South Division winners: 2011–12
- East Region Division Two winners: 1979–80, 1989–90, 1991–92
- East of Scotland Junior Cup: 1966–67, 1971–72
- Brown Cup: 1955–56, 1969–70
- Dalmeny Cup: 1910–11
- Marshall Cup: 1910–11
