= Burntisland Shipyard F.C. =

Association football club in Scotland

Burntisland Shipyard
- Full name: Burntisland Shipyard Football Club
- Nickname: Shippy
- Founded: 1919
- Ground: Recreation Park, Burntisland
- Capacity: 1,000
- Coordinates: 56°3′51″N 3°14′9″W
- Chairman: Alan Watson
- Manager: Lee Richardson
- League: East of Scotland League Second Division
- 2025–26: East of Scotland League Second Division, 12th of 15
- Website: http://burntislandshipyard.co.uk/
Home colours	Away colours	Third colours

Burntisland Shipyard Football Club are a Scottish football club based in the town of Burntisland, Fife. The club competes in the East of Scotland League Second Division and play their home matches at Recreation Park. They are full members of the Scottish Football Association.

== History ==
The club was formed from the Burntisland Shipbuilding Company's recreation fund, which had been established in 1919 by weekly subscription from the workers at the company to establish recreational activities for themselves. This fund allowed for the establishment of a cricket club, bowls club and two football teams, one at junior level, the other at juvenile level.

The recreation club then bought a ground and built a pavilion at it to facilitate the playing of cricket in the summer months and football in the winter. The junior team faded by the early 1920s, but the juvenile team continued to play in local Fife leagues, and it was in 1925 that the Burntisland Shipyard Amateur F.C. that exists at present was properly formed. They joined the Lothian Amateur Football League, and in 1929 they were allowed to enter the Scottish Cup at the qualifying stages.

It is this fact that made them notable, as they remained one of the few clubs outwith the senior ranks (i.e. SPL; SFL, Highland; East; and South leagues) allowed to participate in the Scottish Cup. They were one of four clubs in this category along with Glasgow University, Golspie Sutherland, and since 2004, Girvan.

Qualification for the Scottish Cup proper happened on few occasions; they first qualified in 1935–36, when they hosted Dumbarton in a first round tie. They held the league side to a creditable 2–2 draw in front of 600 fans on 25 January 1936, before being defeated 3–1 in a replay at Dumbarton on 29 January 1936. They qualified for the cup once again in 1938–39, and hosted Celtic on 21 January 1939. They were defeated 8–3 in front of a crowd of 2,000, but were only losing 3–2 at half-time in the game.

The club continued to play in the Lothian League until 1959, when they joined the Kirkcaldy and District Amateur League. In 1999 they entered the Kingdom Caledonian Football League, the competition in which they played until the end of the 2011–12 season.

Their next qualification to the Scottish Cup was in 1994–95. They managed to defeat St Cuthbert Wanderers by a score of 6–2 in a second round tie held in Burntisland on 7 January 1995, before being defeated 7–0 by Huntly in the third round on 28 January 1995.

With reorganisation of the Scottish Cup in 2007, the team (like all other non-league SFA members) were allowed to enter at the first round stage from the 2007–08 Scottish Cup.

Burntisland Shipyard were admitted into the East of Scotland Football Association and the East of Scotland Football League before the start of the 2012–13 season.

== Staff and board members ==
- Chairman: Alan Watson
- Manager: Lee Richardson
- Assistant manager:
- First Team Coach: Barry Brockie/Andrew Stenhouse
- Goalkeeper Coach: Chris Russell
- Secretary: Andrew Beveridge
- Treasurer: Sandra Beveridge

== Honours ==
Scottish Qualifying Cup (South)

- Runners-up (2): 1971–72, 1994–95

Fife Cup

- Winners: 2017–18

Fife Amateur Cup

- Winners (5): 1931–32, 1945–46, 1989–90, 1991–92, 1996–97
