= Coldstream F.C. =

Association football club in Scotland

Coldstream
- Full name: Coldstream Football Club
- Nickname: Streamers
- Founded: 1895
- Ground: Home Park, Coldstream
- Capacity: 898
- Coordinates: 55°39′7″N 2°15′22″W
- Chairman: David Lauder
- Manager: David Brown
- League: East of Scotland League First Division
- 2025–26: East of Scotland League Second Division, 2nd of 15 (promoted)
- Website: http://coldstreamfc.co.uk/
Home colours	Away colours

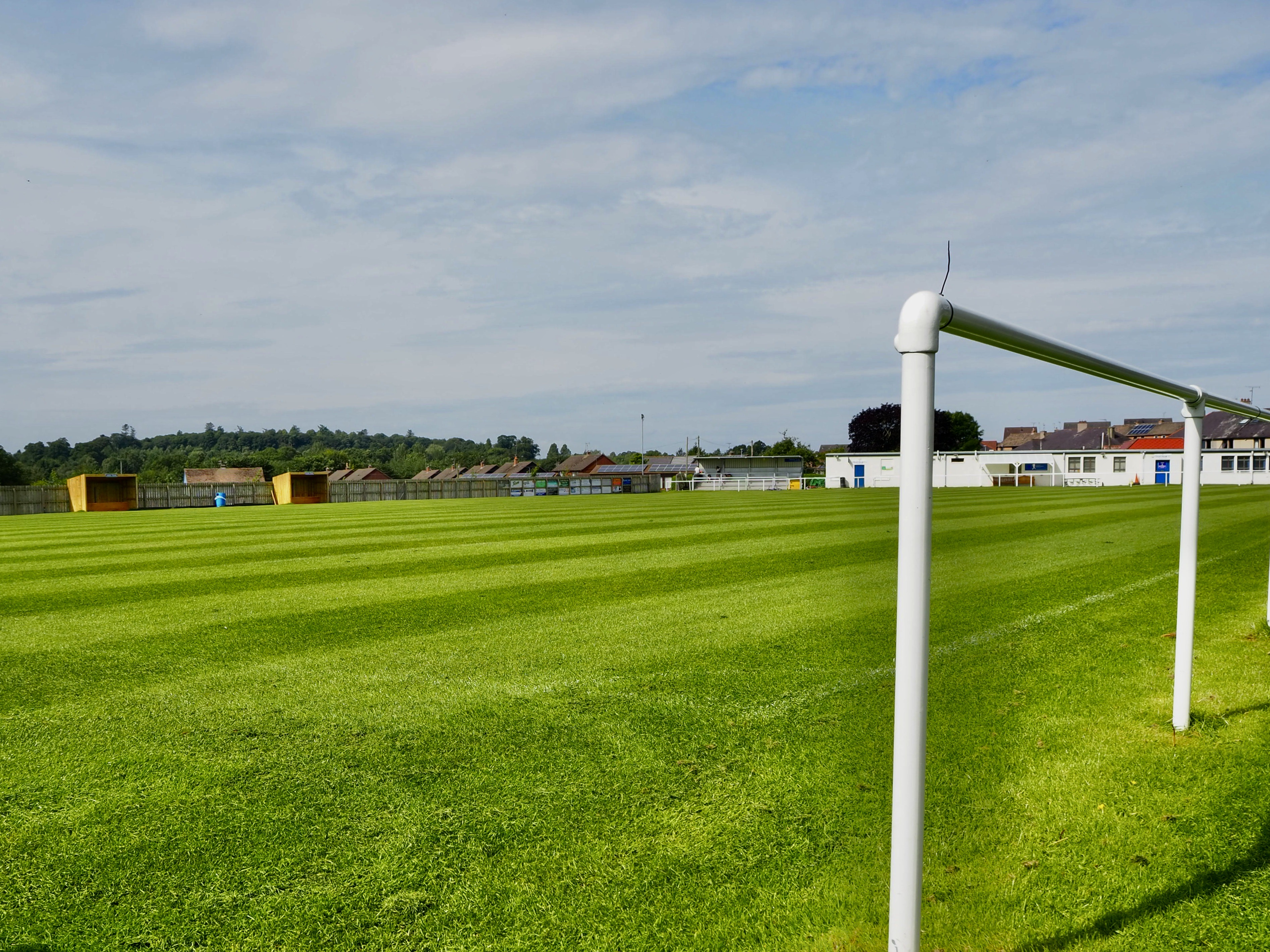
Home Park, Coldstream F.C., Scotland

Coldstream Football Club is a Scottish football club from the town of Coldstream in the Scottish Borders. Formed in 1895, the club is one of the founder members of the East of Scotland Football League, and is now also the longest-serving member. Coldstream won the league's first championship in 1923–24 but have not won the title since. The team have played home matches at Home Park since the club was formed. The team's strip is all blue.

As a licensed member club of the Scottish Football Association, Coldstream are eligible to play in the Scottish Cup. The first time the club won through the Scottish Qualifying Cup was in 1923–24, the club 1–0 at home to Armadale F.C. in the first round before of a crowd of 4,000. The club has never beaten a Scottish League team in the Cup, but it has twice held League clubs to draws.

== Honours ==
East of Scotland Football League

- Champions: 1923–24
- Runners-up: 1968–69

East of Scotland Football League First Division

- Champions: 1989–90
- Runners-up: 2006–07, 2012–13

King Cup

- Winners: 1967–68

East of Scotland Consolation Cup

- Winners: 1924–25

Border Cup

- Winners: 1911–12, 1921–22, 1922–23, 1924–25

Border Senior League

- Champions: 1919–20, 1922–23

Scottish Amateur Cup

- Winners: 1924–25
- Runners-up: 1921-22
