= Sauchie Juniors F.C. =

Association football club in Scotland

Sauchie Juniors
- Full name: Sauchie Juniors Football Club
- Nickname: The Reds
- Founded: 1960
- Ground: Beechwood Park; Sauchie
- Capacity: 5,000 (approx. 200 seated)
- Coordinates: 56°7′49″N 3°46′23″W
- Manager: Iain Diack
- League: East of Scotland League Premier Division
- 2025–25: East of Scotland League Premier Division, 14th of 16
Home colours	Away colours

Sauchie Juniors Football Club are a Scottish football club based in the village of Sauchie, Clackmannanshire. Their home ground is Beechwood Park and club colours are red and white. The team plays in the East of Scotland League Premier Division, having moved from the junior leagues in 2018.

== History ==
Sauchie Junior Football Club began as Sauchie Juveniles, which was a league for players up to 27 years of age. Sauchie won the Scottish Cup four times (1951–52, 1956–57, 1957–58 and 1959–60). Having won every trophy possible as first class Juveniles, Jimmy Millar, the Secretary decided to go into the Junior grade. In the club's second season as a Junior team, it won the East Region League Title in 1962–63, using mostly the Juvenile players.

Sauchie Juniors won the East Region St Michael's Cup twice, in 1972 and 1974. After winning the East Dryburgh Cup in Season 1982–83, the team went on to defeat the other Dryburgh winners (Sunnybank, East Kilbride Thistle and Auchinleck Talbot) to win the National Dryburgh Trophy.

After a barren spell, in season 2002–03 and then again in 2003–04 Sauchie won the Fife & Lothians Cup, defeating Glenrothes and then Linlithgow Rose the following season.

The furthest Sauchie has gone in the Scottish Junior Cup is the quarter-final, losing 4–2 away to Newtongrange Star in 1970, then again in 2004 when after a 0–0 draw at home to Glenrothes, Sauchie were defeated 3–2 in the replay.

In season 2001–02, a team composed mostly of Gairdoch United under 21s, under the guidance of Jan Woojek, brought Sauchie out of the doldrums. Willie Irvine and then Neil Duffy continued the growth with Alan McGonigal taking over until he moved on to Super league side Camelon.

The SJFA restructured prior to the 2006–07 season, and Sauchie found themselves in the 15-team East Region, South Division. They finished second in their first season in the division.

Grant Brough managed the team during the 2008–09 season, finishing third in the league with staff members Myles Allan and Scott Stenhouse. For the 2009–10 season, Fraser Duncan and David Beaton led the team to a fourth-place finish. New players were signed for the following season at Beechwood Park.

In 2011, the club won the East Region South Division to gain promotion to the Premier League. In Sauchie's first season in the Premier League, Duncan and his team won the league to gain promotion to the East Super League. After a best Super League finish of 5th in 2014–15, the club was relegated the following season but immediately gained promotion with a second Premier League title.

In 2018 Sauchie were one of many clubs to move from the Junior leagues to the East of Scotland Football League.

== Ground ==
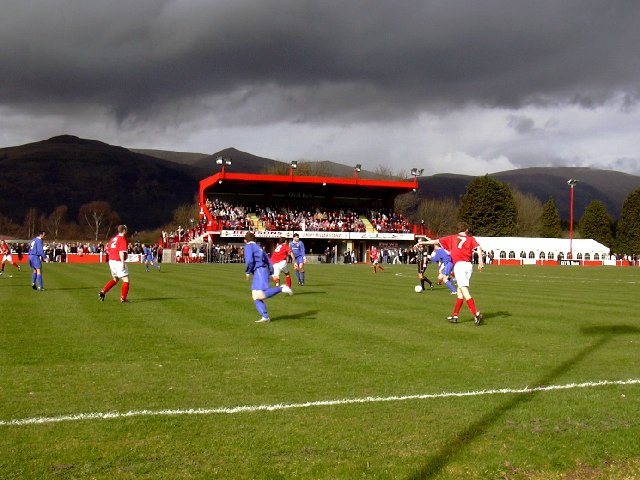
Home game at Beechwood Park against Glenrothes, 26 March 2004

Sauchie Juniors started playing at Fairfield Park, Sauchie, but built a new park for themselves – the present ground – Beechwood Park. This has been developed in 2003 with the building of a new stand, enclosure and erection of floodlights.

- Ground Capacity: 5,000 (approx)
- Covered Standing Area: 500 (approx)
- Seated Stand: 200 (approx)
- Bar/Function Suite Capacity: 100 (approx)

== Former Players ==
Notable Sauchie Juniors alumni include Scotland international Alan Hansen and his brother John, who later played for Partick Thistle. Former Celtic and Scotland player George Connelly ended his playing career at Sauchie Juniors.

Other former players include Joe Craig (Partick Thistle and Celtic), Jim Wallace (Dunfermline), and Paul McHale (Clyde and Dundee).

== Club staff ==
=== Committee ===
Role	Name
President	Noel Dalli
Secretary	Robbie McKenzie
Treasurer	Lorna Duncan

=== Management Team ===
Role	Name
Manager	Iain Diack
Assistant Manager	Kevin Coyle
First Team Coach	Collin Samuel
Technical Director	Andy Brown
Goalkeeper Coach	Greig Maitland

== Current squad ==
As of 25 June 2026

Note: Flags indicate national team as defined under FIFA eligibility rules; some limited exceptions apply. Players may hold more than one non-FIFA nationality.

No.	Pos.	Nation	Player
1	GK	SCO	Jacob Weatherby
2	DF	SCO	Connor Wilaghan
3	FW	SCO	Johnathan Kavanagh
4	DF	SCO	Scott Davidson
5	MF	SCO	Kyle Cringean
6	MF	SCO	Kyle Scott
7	MF	SCO	Sam Davidson (captain)
8	MF	SCO	Euan Griffiths
9	FW	SCO	Conor Kelly
10	DF	SCO	Ross Hutchinson
11	MF	SCO	Aaron Stubberfield
12	MF	SCO	Ross Nimmo
13	GK	SCO	Evan Collumbine
14	FW	SCO	Boyd Diack
15	DF	SCO	Scott McNabney
16	MF	SCO	Rory Hutchinson
16	MF	SCO	Ciaren Chalmers
17	MF	SCO	Jack Simpson

No.	Pos.	Nation	Player
18	MF	SCO	Jack Taylor
19	MF	SCO	Johnny Fekete
20	FW	SCO	Leo Robbins
21	MF	SCO	Brian Morgan
22	FW	SCO	Dominic Kavanagh
—	GK	SCO	Graham Bowman
—	DF	SCO	Archie Swanson
—	DF	SCO	Chris Crawford
—	DF	SCO	John Binnie
—	DF	SCO	Will Greenhorn
—	MF	SCO	Craig Comrie
—	MF	SCO	Rhys Caves
—	FW	SCO	Mikey Cunningham
—	DF	SCO	Flynn Severin
—	MF	SCO	Jerry Otoni
—	MF	SCO	Samuel Collumbine
—	MF	SCO	Danny Smith
—	MF	SCO	Finlay Millar

== Honours ==
East Region Premier League

- Winners (2): 2011–12, 2016–17

East Region South Division winners: 2010–11

Fife & Lothians Cup winners: 2002–03, 2003–04

East of Scotland Junior Cup: 1982–83, 2013–14

East of Scotland League Cup: 2023–24
