= Dunbar United F.C. =

Association football club in Scotland

Dunbar United
- Full name: Dunbar United Football Club
- Nickname: The Seasiders
- Founded: 1925 (101 years ago)
- Ground: New Countess Park; Kellie Road; Dunbar EH42 1DU
- Capacity: 1,200 (250 seated)
- Coordinates: 55°59′54″N 2°31′13″W
- Manager: Darren Smith
- League: East of Scotland League Premier Division
- 2025–26: East of Scotland League Premier Division, 8th of 16
- Website: https://www.dunbarunitedfc.com/
Home colours	Away colours

Dunbar United Football Club is a Scottish football club from the town of Dunbar, East Lothian. The club operates on a semi-professional basis, playing in the East of Scotland League Premier Division. Dunbar United's home strip is black and white stripes their away colours are blue shirt, dark blue shorts and light blue socks.

== History ==
Football in Dunbar can be traced back to 1880, when Dunbar F.C. played Aberlady in a friendly match, and from then onwards a host of clubs were formed, including such names as Dunbar Bluebell, Dunbar Thistle, Dunbar Brittania, Dunbar Castle, Dunbar Star and Dunbar Comrades.

In July 1924, Dunbar United were formed as a juvenile club, but after one season in the local juvenile league the committee decided to play junior football and the club was elected into the Berwickshire Junior League where they won their first trophy after beating the Kings Own Scottish Borderers (K.O.S.B) in the final of the Lees Cup at Duns after a successful protest about one of the K.O.S.B. players ineligibility in the original final, which Dunbar lost.

The following season, the club left the Berwickshire Junior League for the Midlothian Junior League, and they remained with this association until May 2018 (although the name of the league changed on numerous occasions).

Early success followed when they won the league in season 1927–28, and the following 1928–29 season they won the East Lothian Cup after beating Linlithgow Rose 3–2 in a replayed final at Meadowbank after the first game at Easter Road ended 1–1.

The only other success, before the Second World War, was winning the Thornton Shield in 1938–39 after beating Ormiston Primrose 2–0 in the final.

Dunbar played their last game in December 1939 after the outbreak of war and reformed again at the start of season 1946–47. The first trophy after the war was in season 1955–56, when the club won the RL Rae Cup, beating local rivals Haddington Athletic in the final.

However, the greatest moment in the history of the club came in May 1961, when Cambuslang Rangers were defeated 2–0 in the final of the Scottish Junior Cup. After a 2–2 draw in the final at Hampden at the first time of asking, over 23,000 turned up to watch the replay with Dunbar United this time being 2–0 winners over five-time Scottish Junior Cup winners Rangers. Dunbar remain the last East Lothian side to win the Scottish Junior Cup.

The East of Scotland Cup was added to the honours for that season and with confidence high it was no surprise when the league title was won the following season. 1962–63 saw the Brown Cup won for the first time the following season the East of Scotland cup was won a second time after beating Bo’ness United 6–1 in the twice replayed final after the previous games both ended in draws.

A barren spell followed until the ‘B’ league was won in season 1975–76 thus winning the Thistle Trophy.

The club appointed Gordon Haig as their first-ever manager in 1977 (until this time the committee had chosen the team). However, a lapse of 14 years emerged before the East of Scotland Cup was won, for a third time, in season 1989/90 beating Whitburn 2–1 in the final under the management of Jim Milne, who remains to this day as the club's longest serving manager (1981–1991).

Again, success in the second division followed in season 1993–94 under Alex McLaren but after relegation three seasons later the club bounced back straight away winning promotion as champions in season 1997–98 only to be relegated the following season (both times under Tony McLaren's reign as Dunbar United manager). The Brown Cup was won for a second time in June 2000, under co-managers Jocky Miller and Michael Wojtowycz, defeating Haddington Athletic 2–1 in the final at Bonnyrigg and after moving to New Countess Park in 2001 the club had mixed fortunes under manager Willie Pearson winning promotion to the First Division at the end of season 2002–03 before being relegated at the end of season 2004–05 despite an enjoyable run to the last 16 of the Scottish Junior Cup only losing out to Lugar Boswell Thistle on penalties after two drawn games.

After the leagues were reorganised in 2006–07 the club played in the lower tier of the three divisions and was typically in a low position at the end of each season. Season 2007–08 almost saw the club fold due to a shortage of committee members and financial problems but the club survived following hard work from a new committee.

After some resurgence in Season 2016–17 the club won the East Region South Division and gained promotion to the Premier Division under the management of Geoff Jones where they consolidated for one season before the decision was taken to withdraw from the Scottish Junior Football Association at the end of season 2017–18 and enter the East of Scotland League Conference A with the lure of entering into the Scottish Football Association pyramid system.

A fifth-placed finish in season 2018–19, when the East of Scotland leagues reconstructed, was enough to ensure promotion to the East of Scotland Premier League where the club still competes today.

A very difficult spell for the club followed in November 2019 when long-serving club secretary Malcolm Jones, a driving force at the club and the father of the club's then manager, died suddenly at a game. That 2019–20 season ended prematurely due to COVID-19 restrictions and a new committee took over the running of the club ahead of the 2020–21 season a season that also came to an abrupt end due to the impact of the pandemic.

An off the field transformation of the club has recently taken place, under a new chairman Stuart Robertson. The club became a Community Interest Company in December 2020, and was awarded an SFA club licence ahead of season 2021–22. The club made their senior Scottish Cup debut in season 2021–22, reaching the second round before being beaten in a replay by Lothian Thistle Hutchison Vale at Ainslie Park.

The club was relegated in 2021–22 to the East Of Scotland First Division; however, this did little to halt progress at the club and the club completed the development of a new stand in July 2022 while that season they also established an under-20s side, completing their link up with Dunbar United Colts. Supporters attended matches in record numbers and their stay in the East of Scotland First Division was short with the club winning the First Division in season 2022–23 and returning to the Premier League emboldened by improved facilities and a strong under-20s side.

== Honours ==
- Scottish Junior Cup winners: 1960–61

Other Honours

- Brown Cup winners: 1962–63, 1999–00
- East of Scotland First Division champions: 2022–23
- East Lothian Cup winners: 1928–29
- East of Scotland Junior Cup winners: 1960–61, 1963–64, 1989–90
- East Region Division Two champions: 1975–76, 1993–94, 1997–98
- East Region South Division League champions: 2016–17
- Edinburgh & District League champions: 1961–62
- Lees Cup winners: 1925–26
- Midlothian League Winners: 1927–28
- R.L. Rae Cup Winners: 1955–56
- Thistle Cup Winners: 1975–76
- Thornton Shield Winners: 1938–39

== Current squad ==
As of 31 July 2026

Note: Flags indicate national team as defined under FIFA eligibility rules; some limited exceptions apply. Players may hold more than one non-FIFA nationality.

No.	Pos.	Nation	Player
1	GK	SCO	Aaron Hamilton
2	DF	SCO	Willis Hare
3	DF	SCO	John Ward
4	DF	SCO	Dean Whitson (vice-captain)
5	DF	SCO	Grant Thomson (captain)
6	MF	SCO	Aaron Congalton
7	FW	SCO	Gregor Goldie
8	MF	SCO	Bob Berry
9	FW	SCO	Jason Craig
10	FW	SCO	Darren Handling
11	FW	SCO	Mackenize Lawler
12	MF	SCO	Ross Young
13	GK	SCO	Sean Brennan
15	DF	SCO	Gordon Harris
17	FW	SCO	Daniel Hall
18	FW	SCO	Conner Duthie
22	MF	SCO	Adam Collin
23	MF	SCO	Sam Meaney (On loan to Linton Hotspur)
TBC	DF	SCO	Millar Ritchie
TBC	MF	SCO	Harvey Chisholm (On loan from The Spartans)

== Management ==
Position	Name
Manager	Darren Smith
Assistant manager	Stuart Allan
Goalkeeping coach	Brad Murray
Sports therapist	Emma Forsyth
Under-20s Manager	Stuart Allan

== Notable players ==
Former

Notable players of Dunbar United over the years include:

- Former Dunfermline and Rangers great Alex Smith began his career at Dunbar before going on to play over 200 games at Dunfermline and 40 for Rangers, including the European Cup Winners Cup Final in 1967.
- A club-record transfer fee was received for Kevin Twaddle from St Johnstone in 1994. Twaddle went on to play for St Johnstone, Motherwell and Hearts in the SPL.
- In the late 1990s, the club signed former Hearts pair Wayne Foster and George Wright, following the signing of former Hearts and Partick Thistle goalkeeper John Brough earlier that decade.
- Ian Black is an ex-Scotland internationalist, having played with Heart of Midlothian and Rangers. He played for Dunbar United from March 2020 until June 2021.
- Former club captain Fraser McLaren began his career and played in the SPL with Gretna and played SPFL football with Berwick Rangers and Peterhead.
- In season 2022/23 the club signed Josh Walker who began his career with Middlesbrough and played for other English professional clubs including AFC Bournemouth and Watford. He also played in the Scottish Premier League with Aberdeen.
