= Edinburgh United F.C. =

Association football club in Scotland

Edinburgh United
- Full name: Edinburgh United Football Club
- Founded: 1985
- Ground: Paties Road Stadium, Katesmill Road, Edinburgh
- Capacity: 2,500 (200 seated)
- Coordinates: 55°54′53″N 3°15′9″W
- Manager: David Carlin
- League: East of Scotland League Second Division
- 2025–26: East of Scotland League Third Division, 2nd of 11 (promoted)
Home colours	Away colours

Edinburgh United Football Club is a Scottish football club, based in the Colinton / Craiglockhart area of Edinburgh. Formed in 1985, the team competes in the East of Scotland League Second Division, having moved from the junior leagues in 2018.

== History ==
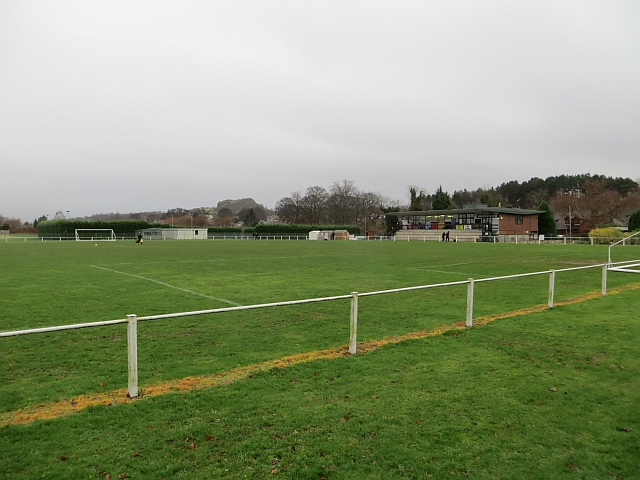
Paties Road ground in 2014

Edinburgh United were the sole Junior club in Edinburgh for the majority of their time in those leagues, with all other non-league clubs based in the city either playing in the senior East of Scotland Football League or latterly the Lowland Football League. Spartans ran a Junior team for four seasons from 2009 to 2013, while Warriston based Craigroyston joined the Junior setup from 2016. Both clubs moved into the East of Scotland League in 2018.

David Carlin was reappointed manager in November 2025 after a previous spell 18 months prior. He is assisted by Michael Hay, with first team coaches Ruaridh Delaney, Blair McDonald and Matthew Quinn, and goalkeeping coach Scott Garriock. The current club captain is Todd Teviotdale.

Edinburgh United currently also have a youth section catering for ages from 5-16 and play in the youth ESSDA leagues.

== Ground ==
The club play their small sided games at Powerleague Portobello in Edinburgh. They have also made appearances at Meadowbank Stadium.

== Kit ==
The team play in black and white strips.

== Honours ==
- Fife & Lothians Cup: 1988–89
- East Region Division Two winners: 1985–86
- Brown Cup: 1986–87, 1988–89
- East Region South Division: 2013–14
