= 1999–2000 Scottish Challenge Cup =

1999–2000 Bell's Challenge Cup
Tournament details
- Country: Scotland
- Teams: 30

Final positions
- Champions: Alloa Athletic
- Runners-up: Inverness Caledonian Thistle

Tournament statistics
- Matches played: 29
- Goals scored: 98 (3.38 per match)

The 1999–2000 Scottish Challenge Cup was the ninth season of the competition, which was also known as the Bell's Challenge Cup for sponsorship reasons. It was competed for by the 30 member clubs of the Scottish Football League. The defending champions were Falkirk, who defeated Queen of the South 1–0 in the 1997 final; and lost 5–4 to Stranraer on penalties in the First round.

The final was played on 21 November 1999, between Inverness Caledonian Thistle and Alloa Athletic at Excelsior Stadium in Airdrie. Alloa Athletic won 5–4 on penalties after a 4–4 draw after extra time, to win the tournament for the first time in the club's history.

== Schedule ==
Round	First match date	Fixtures	Clubs
First round	Tuesday 10 August 1999	14	30 → 16
Second round	Tuesday 24 August 1999	8	16 → 8
Quarter-finals	Tuesday 14 September 1999	4	8 → 4
Semi-finals	Tuesday 28 September 1999	2	4 → 2
Final	Sunday 21 November 1999	1	2 → 1

== First round ==
Forfar Athletic and Livingston received random byes into the second round.

10 August 1999	Airdrieonians	2–1	Dumbarton	Excelsior Stadium, Airdrie
	Moore 11', 56'		Dillon 74' (pen.)

10 August 1999	Arbroath	3–2	East Fife	Gayfield Park, Arbroath
	McGlashan 74'; Mercer 88'; Brownlie 89'		Robertson 32'; Wright 90'

10 August 1999	Ayr United	0–1	Raith Rovers	Somerset Park, Ayr
			Clark 44'

10 August 1999	Berwick Rangers	4–1	Queen of the South	Shielfield Park, Berwick-upon-Tweed
	M. Neil 25'; Leask 50'; A. Neill 56'; Patterson 64'		Adams 82'

10 August 1999	Brechin City	0–1	Queen's Park	Glebe Park, Brechin
			Brown 48'

10 August 1999	Clyde	0–4	Ross County	Broadwood Stadium, Cumbernauld
			Fraser 17'; Geraghty 33'; Irvine 64'; Shaw 81'

10 August 1999	Cowdenbeath	0–4	Alloa Athletic	Central Park, Cowdenbeath
			Cameron 4'; Beaton 21'; McKechnie 26'; Sneddon 50' (o.g.)

10 August 1999	Dunfermline Athletic	2 – 2 (a.e.t.) (4–5 p)	Greenock Morton	East End Park, Dunfermline
	Coyle 74', 85'		Hawke 27'; Thomas 43'

10 August 1999	East Stirlingshire	1 – 2 (a.e.t.)	Clydebank	Firs Park, Falkirk
	Hardie 76'		McLaughlin 79'; Cormack 113'

10 August 1999	Inverness Caledonian Thistle	1–0	St Mirren	Caledonian Stadium, Inverness
	Teasdale 88'			Attendance: 1,343

10 August 1999	Montrose	1–3	Hamilton Academical	Links Park, Montrose
	Taylor 80' (pen.)		Moore 36'; Henderson 55' (pen.); McCormick 74'

10 August 1999	Partick Thistle	0–2	Albion Rovers	Firhill Stadium, Glasgow
			Rae 11'; Tait 90'

10 August 1999	Stirling Albion	2 – 2 (a.e.t.) (6–5 p)	Stenhousemuir	Forthbank Stadium, Stirling
	Paterson 54' (pen.); Gardner 91'		Hamilton 58'; Watters 120'

10 August 1999	Stranraer	2 – 2 (a.e.t.) (5–4 p)	Falkirk	Stair Park, Stranraer
	Blaikie 7', 15'		McDonald 53'; Lawrie 90'

Source: Soccerbase

== Second round ==
24 August 1999	Airdrieonians	1–2	Alloa Athletic	Excelsior Stadium, Airdrie
	Johnston 90'		Nelson 45'; Little 51'

24 August 1999	Clydebank	4–3	Forfar Athletic
	Ewing 18', 25', 59'; McWilliams 32'		Christie 12'; Milne 16', 84'

24 August 1999	Hamilton Academical	0–3	Inverness Caledonian Thistle	Firhill Stadium, Glasgow
			Stewart 41', 59'; McLean 84'	Attendance: 298

24 August 1999	Livingston	2 – 1 (a.e.t.)	Berwick Rangers	Almondvale Stadium, Livingston
	Bingham 69', 105'		Patterson 37'

24 August 1999	Queen's Park	3–1	Albion Rovers	Hampden Park, Glasgow
	Gallagher 23', 35'; Whelan 73'		Tait 68'

24 August 1999	Ross County	3–0	Greenock Morton	Victoria Park, Dingwall
	Irvine 22'; Shaw 69' (pen.); Wood 88'		Curran (red card) 50'

24 August 1999	Stirling Albion	1 – 1 (a.e.t.) (4–3 p)	Arbroath	Forthbank Stadium, Stirling
	Graham 19'		McGlashan 42'

24 August 1999	Stranraer	1–2	Raith Rovers	Stair Park, Stranraer
	Knox 47'		Andrews 32'; Dargo 89'

Source: Soccerbase

== Quarter-finals ==
14 September 1999

Inverness Caledonian Thistle	2–0	Clydebank
Glancy 18'; Robson 64'	Report

Caledonian Stadium, Inverness
Attendance: 635

14 September 1999

Livingston	3–1	Raith Rovers
McPhee 1'; Britton 30'; Millar 89'	Report	McManus 32' (o.g.)

Almondvale Stadium, Livingston

14 September 1999

Ross County	1 – 2 (a.e.t.)	Alloa Athletic
Shaw 41'	Report	Donaghy 82'; Irvine 113'

Victoria Park, Dingwall

14 September 1999

Stirling Albion	4–0	Queen's Park
Gardner 27'; Whelan 53' (o.g.); Graham 68'; Wood 75'	Report

Forthbank Stadium, Stirling

== Semi-finals ==
28 September 1999

Inverness Caledonian Thistle	1–0	Livingston
Sheerin 88'	Report

Caledonian Stadium, Inverness
Attendance: 1,025

28 September 1999

Stirling Albion	1–2	Alloa Athletic
McQuade 37'; Wood (red card) 71'	Report	Bannerman 76'; Irvine 80' (pen.)

Forthbank Stadium, Stirling

== Final ==
21 November 1999
15:00

Inverness Caledonian Thistle	4 – 4 (a.e.t.) (4 – 5 pen.)	Alloa Athletic
Wilson 28'; Sheerin 46' (pen.), 56' (pen.), 112'	Report	G. Clark 19'; Wilson 33'; Cameron 47', 104'

Excelsior Stadium, Airdrie
Attendance: 4,043
Referee: Jim McCluskey

== Notes ==
A. The 1998–99 tournament was suspended due to lack of sponsorship
