= Martin Cameron (footballer) =

Scottish footballer (born 1978)

Personal information
- Full name: Martin George William Cameron
- Date of birth: 16 June 1978 (age 48)
- Place of birth: Dunfermline, Scotland
- Position: Striker

Senior career*
| Years | Team | Apps | (Gls) |
| 1997–2000 | Alloa Athletic | 89 | (38) |
| 2000–2002 | Bristol Rovers | 39 | (6) |
| 2002 | → Partick Thistle (loan) | 8 | (1) |
| 2002–2003 | St Mirren | 28 | (12) |
| 2003–2005 | Gretna | 26 | (17) |
| 2005 | Shamrock Rovers | 5 | (0) |
| 2005–2006 | Forfar Athletic | 23 | (4) |
| 2006–2009 | Penicuik Athletic | 0 | (0) |
| 2009–2010 | Bonnyrigg Rose Athletic | 0 | (0) |
| 2010 | Tranent Juniors | 0 | (0) |
| 2013 | Penicuik Athletic | 0 | (0) |
| Total | | 213 | (78) |
- * Club domestic league appearances and goals

Martin George William Cameron (born 16 June 1978) is a Scottish football striker.

== Playing career ==
Cameron began his career in 1997 with Alloa Athletic, where he made was a big fan's favourite scoring 48 goals including two in the 1999 Scottish Challenge Cup final win for Alloa. The game finished 4-4 with Cameron scoring Alloa's third and fourth. Alloa won a nail-biting penalty shootout 5-4 with goalkeeper Mark Cairns scoring the decisive penalty. Martin formed great strike partnerships at the club with Willie Irvine and on loan Colin Nish from Dunferminline Athletic at his time with the club. After winning the Scottish Challenge Cup Alloa also gained promotion to the Scottish First Division. This meant that clubs north and south of the border had taken note of Cameron's goal scoring prowess and Alloa could not hold on to Martin with the club being part-time and he was sold to Bristol Rovers for a club record fee of £100,000 in July 2000.

Martin was keen to establish himself as a full-time professional football player and the start to his Bristol Rovers career was promising with scoring his first goal for the club in the English League Cup against Plymouth Argyle. However, Martin suffered an ankle injury against Brentford and as a result, missed six weeks the season. After the injury, Martin returned to the Rovers team and scored a goal against rivals Bristol City but was hampered with injury for other parts of the season. In his second season with Bristol Rovers, Martin failed to establish himself in the first team and join Partick Thistle on loan for three months helping the Jags gain promotion to the SPL.

Cameron left Bristol Rovers at the end of the 2001–02 season joining St Mirren for one year scoring a total of 17 goals in all competitions. After a year at St Mirren, Cameron joined Gretna

With Gretna, Cameron helped the team to promotion to the Scottish Second Division in his second year with the club. He started the 2005 season at Shamrock Rovers making his debut on 18 March.

Cameron moved clubs again this time to Forfar Athletic for the 2005–06 season. After one season at Forfar, Cameron then joined junior team Penicuik Athletic. He is now a businessman with his own courier company.

== Honours ==
=== Player ===
Alloa Athletic

- Scottish Challenge Cup 1999–2000
