= James Hepburn =

James Hepburn may refer to:

- James Hepburn (bishop) (died 1524), Bishop of Moray
- James Hepburn, 4th Earl of Bothwell (c. 1534–1578), Scottish ruler, Duke of Orkney, the third husband of Mary, Queen of Scots
- Bonaventure Hepburn (James Hepburn, 1573–1621), Scottish orientalist
- James Hepburn Campbell (1820–1895), American politician and diplomat
- James Curtis Hepburn (1815–1911), American missionary
- James de Congalton Hepburn (1878–1955), Canadian MPP
- Jamie Hepburn (born 1979), Scottish politician
- James Hepburn (ornithologist) (1811–1869), English ornithologist
- Jock Hepburn (c. 1860–?), birth name James, Scottish footballer (Alloa Athletic and Scotland)
- James Hepburn (golfer) (1876–1945), golfer from Scotland
- James Hepburn, pseudonymous author of Farewell America: The Plot to Kill JFK
