= Paul McAneny =

Scottish footballer (born 1973)

Personal information
- Full name: Paul McAneny
- Date of birth: 11 November 1973 (age 52)
- Place of birth: Glasgow, Scotland
- Height: 1.80 m (5 ft 11 in)
- Position: Defender

Senior career*
Years	Team	Apps	(Gls)
–1993	Saltcoats Victoria		
1993–1995	Stirling Albion	5	(2)
1995–2000	Alloa Athletic	78	(5)
2000–2001	Stenhousemuir	19	(1)
2001	Greenock Morton	6	(0)
2001–2004	Auchinleck Talbot	37	(3)
2004–2005	Troon		
2005–2010	Hurlford United		
2010–2013	East Kilbride Thistle		
2013	Larkhall Thistle		
2013–2016	Shotts Bon Accord		
2016–2018	Blantyre Victoria		

Managerial career
- 2012–2013: East Kilbride Thistle (player-assistant manager)
- 2013: Larkhall Thistle (player-assistant manager)
- 2013–2016: Shotts Bon Accord (player-assistant manager)
- * Club domestic league appearances and goals

Paul McAneny (born 11 November 1973) is a Scottish former footballer who played as a defender in the lower divisions of the Scottish Football League for teams including Alloa Athletic and Stenhousemuir.

== Club career ==
Paul McAneny began his career at Saltcoats Victoria. He joined Scottish Second Division club Stirling Albion in 1993 and scored twice in five appearances for the club before leaving to join Scottish Third Division club Alloa Athletic on 7 October 1995.

He made his debut for Alloa Athletic on 4 September 1996 during the Scottish League Cup in a 5–1 loss against Celtic in which he also scored. He would then go on to win the 1997–98 Scottish Third Division title and the 1998–99 Scottish Challenge Cup with Alloa Athletic.

He joined Scottish Second Division Stenhousemuir on 1 July 2000 and made his debut for the club during the 4–3 victory against Queen of the South on 5 August 2000. He scored his only goal for Stenhousemuir during the 4–1 victory against Stranraer on 25 November 2000.

On 25 July 2001, McAneny joined Scottish Second Division club Greenock Morton on a three-month deal and he made his debut during the 4–1 victory against his former club Stenhousemuir on 4 August 2001. He left Greenock Morton on 28 September 2001 and subsequently joined Auchinleck Talbot.

He debuted for Auchinleck Talbot on 27 October 2001 during the 1–1 draw with a penalty shootout loss against Lesmahagow Juniors in the West of Scotland Junior Cup first round, and he scored his first goal for the club on 15 December 2001 during the 4–1 victory against Ashfield in the Scottish Senior Cup third round replay.

In December 2003 he scored during the 6–1 victory against Muirkirk Juniors. After leaving Auchinleck Talbot on 1 June 2004, McAneny joined Troon and left after the end of the 2004–05 season to join Hurlford United, where he won the SJFA West Region Ayrshire District League in 2007–08 and 2009–10.

He joined East Kilbride Thistle in 2010 and became player-assistant manager in 2012, notably scoring the equalising goal during the 1–1 draw against Bellshill on 27 April 2013. He then joined Larkhall Thistle as a player-assistant manager in early 2013 before joining Shotts Bon Accord as a player-assistant manager in late 2013.

He then joined West of Scotland League Second Division club Blantyre Victoria in July 2016, and he retired at the end of the 2017–18 season.

== Personal life ==
His daughter Maria McAneny is also a footballer who currently plays for Celtic.

== Career statistics ==
Appearances and goals by club, season and competition
Club	Season	League			Scottish Cup		Scottish League Cup		Scottish Challenge Cup		Other		Total	
Club	Season	Division	Apps	Goals	Apps	Goals	Apps	Goals	Apps	Goals	Apps	Goals	Apps	Goals
Stirling Albion	1993–94	Scottish Second Division	4	1	0	0	0	0	0	0	—		4	1
Stirling Albion	1994–95	Scottish Second Division	1	1	0	0	0	0	0	0	—		1	1
Stirling Albion	Total		5	2	0	0	0	0	0	0	—		5	2
Alloa Athletic	1995–96	Scottish Third Division	0	0	0	0	0	0	0	0	—		0	0
Alloa Athletic	1996–97	Scottish Third Division	2	1	1	1	1	1	0	0	—		4	4
Alloa Athletic	1997–98	Scottish Third Division	23	2	2	0	2	0	1	0	—		28	2
Alloa Athletic	1998–99	Scottish Second Division	34	2	2	0	3	0	0	0	—		39	2
Alloa Athletic	1999–2000	Scottish Second Division	19	0	0	0	1	0	2	0	—		21	0
Alloa Athletic	Total		78	5	5	1	7	1	3	0	—		93	7
Stenhousemuir	2000–01	Scottish Second Division	19	1	1	0	2	0	0	0	—		22	1
Greenock Morton	2001–02	Scottish Second Division	6	0	0	0	1	0	1	0	—		8	0
Greenock Morton	Total		25	1	1	0	3	0	1	0	—		30	1
Auchinleck Talbot	2001–02	Ayrshire Division One	6	0	—		—		—		17 (Note: One appearance in West of Scotland Junior Cup, ten appearances and three goals in Scottish Junior Cup, three appearances in Ayrshire District Cup, one appearance in Ayrshire Junior Cup, two appearances in East Ayrshire Cup)	3	23	3
Auchinleck Talbot	2002–03	WSJFA Premier League	16	3	—		—		—		16 (Note: One appearance in West of Scotland Junior Cup, two appearances in Scottish Junior Cup, one appearance in Ayrshire District Cup, one appearance in West of Scotland Junior Cup, nine appearances in AJFA Sectional League Cup)	0	32	3
Auchinleck Talbot	2003–04	WSJFA Premier League	15	0	—		—		—		10 (Note: One appearance in West of Scotland Junior Cup, two appearances in Scottish Junior Cup, one appearance in Ayrshire Junior Cup, one appearance in West of Scotland Junior Cup, five appearances and one goal in AJFA Sectional League Cup)	1	25	1
Auchinleck Talbot	Total		37	3	—		—		—		43	4	80	7
Career total			144	11	6	1	10	1	4	0	43	4	208	16

== Honours ==
Alloa Athletic

- Scottish Football League Third Division: 1997–98
- Scottish Challenge Cup: 1998–99

Auchinleck Talbot

- Scottish Junior Cup: runner-up 2001–02
- East Ayrshire Cup: 2001–02
- AJFA Sectional League Cup: 2002–03; runner-up 2003–04

Hurlford United

- SJFA West Region Ayrshire District League: 2007–08, 2009–10
