= 2008–09 Football Conference =

Football Conference
- Season: 2008–09

The 2008–09 Football Conference season was the fifth season with the Conference consisting of three divisions, and the thirtieth season overall. The Conference covers the top two levels of Non-League football in England. The Conference Premier was the fifth highest level of the overall pyramid, while the Conference North and Conference South existed at the sixth level. The top team and the winner of the playoff of the National division were promoted to Football League Two, while the bottom four were relegated to the North or South divisions. The champions of the North and South divisions were promoted to the National division, alongside the play-off winners from each division. The bottom three in each of the North and South divisions were relegated to the premier divisions of the Northern Premier League, Isthmian League or Southern League. For sponsorship reasons, the Conference Premier was frequently referred to as the Blue Square Premier.

== Conference Premier ==
A total of 24 teams contested the division, including 18 sides from last season, two relegated from the Football League Two, two promoted from the Conference North and two promoted from the Conference South.

=== Promotion and relegation ===
Teams promoted from 2007–08 Conference North

- Kettering Town
- Barrow

Teams promoted from 2007–08 Conference South

- Lewes
- Eastbourne Borough

Teams relegated from 2007–08 League Two

- Mansfield Town
- Wrexham

Eastbourne, Mansfield, Lewes and Wrexham appear in the Conference Premier for the first time, while Barrow return to the league after ten years. Kettering have three times been runners-up at this level and return to the league after an absence of five years. Altrincham remain in the Conference after a third consecutive reprieve from relegation, following Halifax Town's demotion for financial reasons.

Woking's relegation ended the tenure of the Football Conference's longest serving club, completing seventeen seasons in the top-flight.

=== League table ===
Conference Premier
- Season: 2008–09
- Champions: Burton Albion (1st Football Conference title)
- Promoted to League Two: Burton Albion, Torquay United
- Relegated to Conference North/Conference South: Woking; Northwich Victoria; Weymouth; Lewes
- Promoted for the next season: Tamworth, Gateshead, AFC Wimbledon, Hayes & Yeading United
- Matches: 552
- Goals: 1,410 (2.55 per match)
- Top goalscorer: Andy Mangan (Forest Green Rovers), 26
- Biggest home win: Wrexham – Eastbourne Borough 5–0, Wrexham – Stevenage Borough 5–0
- Biggest away win: Weymouth – Rushden & Diamonds 0–9
- Highest scoring: Weymouth – Rushden & Diamonds 0–9, Oxford United – Eastbourne Borough 6–3
- Longest winning run: Burton Albion (12 games)
- Longest unbeaten run: Burton Albion (18 games)
- Longest losing run: ?
- Average attendance: 1,783 (−1% compared with the previous season)

Pos	Team	Pld	W	D	L	GF	GA	GD	Pts	Promotion, qualification or relegation
1	Burton Albion (C, P)	46	27	7	12	81	52	+29	88	Promotion to Football League Two
2	Cambridge United	46	24	14	8	65	39	+26	86	Qualification for the Conference Premier play-offs
3	Histon	46	23	14	9	78	48	+30	83	Qualification for the Conference Premier play-offs
4	Torquay United (O, P)	46	23	14	9	72	47	+25	83	Qualification for the Conference Premier play-offs
5	Stevenage Borough	46	23	12	11	73	54	+19	81	Qualification for the Conference Premier play-offs
6	Kidderminster Harriers	46	23	10	13	69	48	+21	79	
7	Oxford United	46	24	10	12	72	51	+21	77 (Note: Oxford United were deducted 5 points for fielding an unregistered player.)	
8	Kettering Town	46	21	13	12	50	37	+13	76	
9	Crawley Town	46	19	14	13	77	55	+22	70 (Note: Crawley Town were deducted 4 points, later reduced to 1 on appeal, for fielding an unregistered player.)	
10	Wrexham	46	18	12	16	64	48	+16	66	
11	Rushden & Diamonds	46	16	15	15	61	50	+11	63	
12	Mansfield Town	46	19	9	18	57	55	+2	62 (Note: Mansfield Town were deducted 4 points for fielding an unregistered player.)	
13	Eastbourne Borough	46	18	6	22	58	70	−12	60	
14	Ebbsfleet United	46	16	10	20	52	60	−8	58	
15	Altrincham	46	15	11	20	49	66	−17	56	
16	Salisbury City	46	14	13	19	54	64	−10	55	
17	York City	46	11	19	16	47	51	−4	52	
18	Forest Green Rovers	46	12	16	18	70	76	−6	52	
19	Grays Athletic	46	14	10	22	44	64	−20	52	
20	Barrow	46	12	15	19	51	65	−14	51	
21	Woking (R)	46	10	14	22	37	60	−23	44	Relegation to Conference South
22	Northwich Victoria (R)	46	11	10	25	56	75	−19	43	Relegation to Conference North
23	Weymouth (R)	46	11	10	25	45	86	−41	43	Relegation to Conference South
24	Lewes (R)	46	6	6	34	28	89	−61	24	Relegation to Conference South

Source: Football Conference
Rules for classification: 1) points; 2) goal difference; 3) number of goals scored.
(C) Champions; (O) Play-off winners; (P) Promoted; (R) Relegated

=== Results ===
Home \ Away	ALT	BRW	BRT	CAM	CRA	EAB	EBB	FGR	GRY	HIS	KET	KID	LEW	MAN	NOR	OXF	R&D	SAL	STB	TOR	WEY	WOK	WRE	YOR
Altrincham		3–4	1–3	1–0	2–2	2–2	2–0	2–5	2–0	0–1	1–1	2–2	1–0	1–0	1–0	1–0	0–4	0–0	1–2	0–1	4–0	1–0	1–1	1–1
Barrow	2–2		0–0	0–2	3–3	3–1	0–3	3–1	1–1	1–0	2–4	1–0	2–0	2–1	0–0	3–0	1–1	0–0	1–3	1–1	0–1	0–1	1–1	0–0
Burton Albion	1–1	2–1		3–1	2–1	2–0	3–1	4–2	4–0	3–1	1–1	2–2	5–2	1–0	1–1	0–1	3–0	1–2	2–0	0–1	1–1	3–2	2–1	2–1
Cambridge United	0–0	2–1	2–0		1–1	2–1	1–0	0–1	1–0	2–2	0–2	2–1	1–0	2–1	4–1	1–1	0–0	4–0	1–1	0–2	1–0	4–1	2–0	1–0
Crawley Town	4–0	4–0	4–0	2–2		1–0	1–2	2–2	2–1	3–3	1–0	2–0	5–1	2–1	5–2	0–1	0–0	0–3	0–2	3–1	4–2	2–2	1–0	0–1
Eastbourne Borough	1–0	0–2	1–2	0–3	2–1		0–1	1–0	2–1	1–1	1–2	2–3	1–0	1–2	4–1	0–3	0–1	0–0	2–1	4–2	3–0	0–0	1–0	2–1
Ebbsfleet United	1–0	1–0	2–1	1–1	4–4	1–1		0–1	0–1	0–1	0–0	1–1	2–1	2–2	1–0	1–1	1–0	2–2	4–0	0–2	1–0	2–0	1–0	0–0
Forest Green Rovers	1–3	2–1	2–3	2–2	1–0	1–2	1–4		1–1	2–2	0–2	2–2	4–1	1–0	3–0	3–3	4–0	1–2	0–3	1–2	4–1	0–2	2–3	1–1
Grays Athletic	2–1	2–1	0–1	0–1	1–0	0–1	3–1	2–1		1–4	1–1	3–2	0–0	2–1	2–1	2–0	0–0	3–1	1–2	1–2	1–1	1–1	2–1	1–0
Histon	1–0	2–0	4–3	1–1	1–0	3–3	5–2	0–1	1–4		1–0	1–1	1–1	3–0	2–1	5–2	0–0	2–0	0–0	1–1	1–0	1–0	1–0	1–1
Kettering Town	3–1	0–0	0–1	1–2	1–1	0–1	2–1	1–1	0–0	1–0		1–0	1–0	1–3	2–1	1–2	1–1	1–0	1–0	2–1	0–1	1–0	1–0	4–2
Kidderminster Harriers	4–0	0–1	2–1	1–3	2–0	2–0	3–1	1–1	2–0	2–0	0–1		1–1	2–0	1–2	1–0	2–1	3–2	4–2	1–0	0–2	3–0	1–0	2–0
Lewes	2–0	0–3	0–1	0–2	0–3	0–2	0–0	3–2	2–0	0–3	1–2	0–1		0–1	2–3	2–1	0–4	1–4	0–2	0–2	1–0	0–2	0–2	1–1
Mansfield Town	2–0	2–2	0–2	1–1	1–0	3–1	2–0	3–0	1–0	1–0	0–0	4–2	1–0		3–2	1–3	0–0	3–0	2–1	1–1	2–1	0–1	1–2	1–0
Northwich Victoria	0–1	2–1	0–1	0–1	0–1	1–2	2–0	0–0	2–0	1–2	0–0	1–1	3–0	2–0		1–2	4–2	1–1	0–1	2–3	2–3	2–0	1–2	2–2
Oxford United	1–0	3–0	2–1	3–1	1–2	6–3	5–1	2–1	4–1	2–1	1–1	1–0	2–1	1–0	1–2		2–1	2–0	1–1	0–2	0–1	0–0	1–0	1–0
Rushden & Diamonds	1–1	1–1	2–1	1–2	0–1	2–0	2–0	2–2	1–0	1–2	1–0	0–1	2–1	0–1	2–1	1–3		2–1	1–1	1–3	1–0	3–1	1–1	2–0
Salisbury City	1–3	3–0	0–1	1–2	2–0	2–0	1–0	2–2	1–0	0–4	1–2	0–0	1–2	2–3	1–1	2–1	1–1		2–4	2–2	1–0	1–0	1–4	1–1
Stevenage Borough	3–0	3–0	4–1	2–1	1–1	1–3	1–0	1–1	0–0	1–3	2–1	3–1	3–0	3–2	1–1	1–1	3–1	2–0		0–0	1–1	1–0	1–2	3–3
Torquay United	3–1	4–1	2–1	0–0	0–2	2–0	0–2	3–3	1–1	4–1	2–0	0–1	4–1	2–0	2–1	0–2	1–1	0–1	3–0		0–2	2–1	1–1	1–1
Weymouth	2–0	0–3	0–5	2–2	2–2	3–2	0–2	1–1	3–1	2–5	0–2	1–2	2–0	1–1	3–0	2–2	0–9	0–4	0–3	0–1		1–1	1–3	1–2
Woking	1–2	1–0	0–0	0–1	0–0	0–4	1–0	0–1	3–1	1–0	0–1	1–5	1–1	2–2	4–1	0–2	1–1	1–0	0–1	2–2	1–1		1–1	0–2
Wrexham	0–1	1–1	0–1	2–0	0–2	5–0	3–2	1–1	3–2	0–0	2–1	0–1	2–0	2–0	3–3	2–0	0–3	1–1	5–0	1–1	1–1	1–1		3–1
York City	1–2	1–1	1–3	0–0	1–0	1–0	3–1	2–1	0–1	1–1	0–0	0–0	3–0	3–0	1–1	0–0	2–0	1–1	0–2	1–2	2–0	2–0	1–0	

Updated to match(es) played on unknown. Source: Soccerbase
Legend: Blue = home team win; Yellow = draw; Red = away team win.

=== Play-offs ===
Semi-finals
5	Stevenage Borough	3	0	3
2	Cambridge United	1	3	4
4	Torquay United	2	0	2
3	Histon	0	1	1

Final at Wembley Stadium
2	Cambridge United	0
4	Torquay United	2

==== Semifinals ====
30 April 2009
19:30
1st Leg

Stevenage Borough	3–1	Cambridge United
Roberts 47'; Morison 61', 84'	Report	Phillips 49'

Broadhall Way, Stevenage
Attendance: 4,446
Referee: R Whitton
4 May 2009
2nd Leg

Cambridge United	3–0 (a.e.t.)	Stevenage Borough
Willmott 55'; Rendell 72', 119'	Report

Abbey Stadium, Cambridge
Attendance: 6,507
Referee: Paul Tierney

Cambridge United won 4–3 on Aggregate.

1 May 2009
20:00
1st Leg

Torquay United	2–0	Histon
Wroe 36'; Sills 74'	Report

Plainmoor, Torquay
Attendance: 3,737
Referee: J Waugh
4 May 2009
2nd Leg

Histon	1–0	Torquay United
Andrews 16'	Report

Bridge Road, Impington
Attendance: 2,481
Referee: Steven Rushton

Torquay United won 2–1 on Aggregate.

==== Play-Off Final ====
17 May 2009
16:00

Cambridge United	0–2	Torquay United
	Report	Hargreaves 35'; Sills 75'

Wembley Stadium, London
Attendance: 35,089
Referee: Gary Sutton

=== Stadia and locations ===
Locations of the Conference Premier 2008–09 teams

=== Top goalscorers ===
Pos	Player	Team	Goals
1	(England) Andy Mangan	Forest Green Rovers	26
2	(England) James Constable	Oxford United	23
3	(Wales) Steve Morison	Stevenage Borough	22
4	(England) Charlie Griffin	Salisbury City	21
5	(England) Matthew Barnes-Homer	Kidderminster Harriers	20
5	(England) Jack Midson	Histon	20
7	(England) Greg Pearson	Burton Albion	18
8	(England) Colin Little	Altrincham	16
8	(England) Justin Richards	Kidderminster Harriers	16
10	(England) Shaun Harrad	Burton Albion	15
10	(Dominica) Jefferson Louis	Wrexham	15
10	(England) Gareth Seddon	Kettering Town	15
10	(England) Richard Brodie	York City	15

== Conference North ==
Conference North
- Season: 2008–09
- Champions: Tamworth
- Promoted: Tamworth; Gateshead
- Relegated: Burscough; Hucknall Town
- Top goalscorer: Lee Novak (26)

A total of 22 teams contested the division, including 16 sides from last season, three relegated from the Conference Premier, two promoted from the Northern Premier League and one promoted from the Southern Football League.

=== Promotion and relegation ===
Teams promoted from 2007–08 Northern Premier League Premier Division

- Gateshead
- Fleetwood Town

Teams promoted from 2007–08 Southern League Premier Division

- King's Lynn

Teams relegated from 2007–08 Conference Premier

- Droylsden
- Stafford Rangers
- Farsley Celtic

Droylsden and Farsley are returned having spent just one season in the higher league. Fleetwood reached a new high eleven seasons after being re-formed following the bankruptcy of the original Fleetwood Town. Both Boston United and Nuneaton Borough were expelled from the league for financial reasons before the season, resulting in Vauxhall Motors relegation and Redditch United's transfer to the Conference South being cancelled.

=== League table ===
Pos	Team	Pld	W	D	L	GF	GA	GD	Pts	Promotion, qualification or relegation
1	Tamworth (C, P)	42	24	13	5	70	41	+29	85	Promotion to Conference Premier
2	Gateshead (O, P)	42	24	8	10	81	48	+33	80	Qualification for the Conference North play-offs
3	Alfreton Town	42	20	17	5	81	48	+33	77	Qualification for the Conference North play-offs
4	AFC Telford United	42	22	10	10	65	34	+31	76	Qualification for the Conference North play-offs
5	Southport	42	21	13	8	63	36	+27	76	Qualification for the Conference North play-offs
6	Stalybridge Celtic	42	20	10	12	71	50	+21	70	
7	Droylsden	42	18	14	10	64	44	+20	68	
8	Fleetwood Town	42	17	11	14	70	66	+4	62	
9	Harrogate Town	42	17	10	15	66	57	+9	61	
10	Hinckley United	42	16	9	17	56	59	−3	57	
11	Vauxhall Motors	42	14	11	17	51	67	−16	53	
12	Workington	42	13	12	17	54	55	−1	51	
13	Gainsborough Trinity	42	12	14	16	57	63	−6	50	
14	Redditch United	42	12	14	16	49	61	−12	50	
15	Blyth Spartans	42	14	7	21	50	58	−8	49	
16	Solihull Moors	42	13	10	19	49	73	−24	49	
17	King's Lynn (R)	42	10	18	14	50	60	−10	48	Demoted to the Northern Premier League Premier Division (Note: King's Lynn were demoted as their stadium did not meet the league standards. Hyde United were reprieved from relegation as a result.)
18	Stafford Rangers	42	12	12	18	41	56	−15	48	
19	Farsley Celtic	42	14	5	23	58	65	−7	47	
20	Hyde United	42	11	9	22	57	80	−23	42	
21	Burscough (R)	42	10	6	26	43	80	−37	36	Relegation to the Northern Premier League Premier Division
22	Hucknall Town (R)	42	5	13	24	39	84	−45	28	Relegation to the Northern Premier League Premier Division

Source: Football Conference
Rules for classification: 1) points; 2) goal difference; 3) number of goals scored.
(C) Champions; (O) Play-off winners; (P) Promoted; (R) Relegated

=== Locations ===
Locations of the Conference North 2008–09 teams

=== Results ===
Home \ Away	TEL	ALF	BLY	BUR	DRO	FAR	FLE	GAI	GAT	HAR	HIN	HUC	HYD	KLY	RED	SOL	SOU	STA	STL	TAM	VAU	WRK
AFC Telford United		0–0	2–1	3–0	2–0	2–0	0–0	2–1	1–0	3–1	4–2	3–1	2–3	1–1	1–1	3–0	1–0	0–1	1–0	0–0	5–1	0–0
Alfreton Town	3–1		1–1	2–0	2–3	3–1	3–3	1–4	1–3	4–1	1–1	5–0	3–2	1–1	2–0	4–1	2–0	2–0	2–1	1–1	3–1	0–0
Blyth Spartans	2–0	2–2		0–2	0–2	5–0	3–0	1–1	0–1	3–4	1–0	3–0	3–0	2–4	1–0	3–0	1–0	2–1	0–0	0–4	0–1	3–1
Burscough	0–2	1–3	2–3		0–1	0–0	1–1	0–2	2–4	0–2	1–1	2–3	2–2	1–1	1–0	1–2	2–3	2–0	0–2	0–1	0–1	2–1
Droylsden	1–0	2–0	2–0	3–1		2–0	1–3	3–2	0–0	2–1	3–0	5–1	2–1	1–0	2–2	2–1	0–0	0–1	1–1	1–1	1–2	1–1
Farsley Celtic	1–0	3–3	3–0	5–1	1–1		4–1	2–1	0–1	1–0	2–3	4–0	2–1	1–1	1–2	0–1	5–1	4–0	2–3	1–3	0–1	0–5
Fleetwood Town	1–0	1–1	1–0	3–1	2–1	2–1		2–2	0–2	1–0	1–0	1–3	1–3	3–0	3–1	2–1	1–1	2–2	1–2	1–2	2–0	1–0
Gainsborough Trinity	1–2	0–2	0–0	0–4	1–0	0–0	3–4		0–0	3–2	3–1	2–2	0–1	2–0	4–1	1–1	0–1	0–3	3–3	0–1	1–1	1–2
Gateshead	1–1	3–0	3–0	4–1	1–1	3–0	2–2	1–0		1–3	5–0	1–0	6–3	3–2	2–0	3–0	1–1	0–1	1–0	5–1	2–2	2–1
Harrogate Town	2–0	2–2	3–1	2–0	1–1	1–0	5–2	0–3	1–0		2–2	2–0	2–1	4–0	1–1	4–0	0–3	3–3	0–1	2–2	2–0	0–1
Hinckley United	0–2	1–1	2–1	0–1	1–0	1–2	2–1	0–2	2–0	2–0		4–0	0–1	1–0	4–2	0–0	1–1	4–0	0–1	1–3	2–3	1–0
Hucknall Town	0–5	1–1	1–1	0–2	1–1	1–2	3–2	1–2	2–2	1–1	1–2		0–1	1–2	0–2	0–2	0–0	3–1	2–3	2–3	0–1	0–0
Hyde United	0–4	1–1	1–0	0–1	1–3	3–1	5–3	0–0	2–5	2–3	0–0	2–0		0–1	1–2	3–1	1–1	1–1	0–2	1–2	3–1	4–4
King's Lynn	1–1	0–4	2–3	0–0	2–2	1–4	1–0	2–2	2–0	2–3	1–1	0–0	4–1		1–1	3–0	0–0	2–2	1–0	1–2	1–1	1–3
Redditch United	0–1	2–2	2–0	1–2	0–4	3–1	1–1	1–1	0–2	2–1	0–2	2–2	1–0	1–2		0–0	0–2	2–2	0–1	1–1	2–1	2–0
Solihull Moors	1–3	2–2	2–0	3–2	2–1	2–1	2–2	2–3	2–0	1–1	1–3	3–1	2–2	1–1	2–1		0–2	0–1	0–2	1–1	3–2	2–0
Southport	1–1	0–1	2–1	3–0	3–1	1–0	1–1	5–3	2–3	1–0	0–0	3–0	2–0	2–1	2–3	3–0		3–2	2–0	0–1	5–2	0–0
Stafford Rangers	1–3	0–2	1–0	0–2	0–0	1–0	1–2	2–0	4–1	0–0	3–1	0–0	2–0	0–0	0–1	0–2	0–3		0–1	0–1	0–1	0–0
Stalybridge Celtic	2–2	0–2	2–0	4–0	2–2	1–0	0–5	1–2	1–2	1–3	7–1	2–2	4–1	1–1	3–3	5–0	0–1	2–0		2–2	1–0	1–4
Tamworth	0–1	1–2	1–1	6–2	2–0	2–1	2–1	0–0	2–1	3–1	1–0	1–1	2–0	2–0	1–1	1–0	1–1	1–2	0–3		2–0	1–0
Vauxhall Motors	2–0	1–1	2–1	2–0	1–4	2–0	0–2	1–1	1–2	1–0	0–4	2–3	2–1	1–3	1–1	2–2	0–0	1–1	1–1	2–2		3–0
Workington	1–0	0–3	0–1	4–1	1–1	0–2	3–2	5–0	4–2	0–0	1–3	1–0	2–2	1–1	0–1	2–1	0–1	2–2	0–2	1–4	3–1	

Updated to match(es) played on unknown. Source: Sky Sports Football Yearbook 2009–2010. Glenda Rollin & Jack Rollin (eds.). Headline, 2009.
Legend: Blue = home team win; Yellow = draw; Red = away team win.

=== Play-offs ===
Semifinals
5	Southport	0	1	1
2	Gateshead	1	1	2
4	AFC Telford United	2	3	5
3	Alfreton Town	0	4	4

Final
2	Gateshead	1
4	AFC Telford United	0

==== Semifinals ====
29 April 2009
1st Leg

Southport	0–1	Gateshead
	Report	Armstrong 15'

Haig Avenue, Southport
Attendance: 1,011
Referee: Paul Graham
3 May 2009
2nd Leg

Gateshead	1–1	Southport
Novak 24'	Report	Booth 52'

Gateshead International Stadium, Gateshead
Attendance: 1,408

Gateshead won 2–1 on Aggregate.

29 April 2009
1st Leg

AFC Telford United	2–0	Alfreton Town
Nwadike 48'; Carey-Bertram 78'	Report

New Bucks Head, Telford
Attendance: 2,346
3 May 2009
2nd Leg

Alfreton Town	4–3	AFC Telford United
Butler 9'; Brown 16'; Clayton 49'; Howell 73' (pen.)	Report	Edwards 19'; Carey-Bertram 42'; Rodgers 52'

Impact Arena, Alfreton
Attendance: 2,244

AFC Telford United won 5–4 on Aggregate.

==== Play-Off Final ====
8 May 2009

Gateshead	1–0	AFC Telford United
Phillips 82'	Report

Gateshead International Stadium, Gateshead
Attendance: 4,203

=== Top goalscorers ===
Pos	Player	Team	Goals
1	(England) Lee Novak	Gateshead	26
2	(England) Gareth Sheldon	Tamworth	23
3	(England) Adam Warlow	Fleetwood Town	19
3	(England) Liam Hearn	Alfreton Town	19
5	(England) Chris Simm	Hyde United	18
6	(England) Paul Clayton	Alfreton Town	17
7	(England) Ciaran Kilheeney	Southport	16
7	(England) Luke Beckett	Gainsborough Trinity	16
9	(England) Gareth Arnison	Workington	15
9	(England) Andy Brown	AFC Telford United	15

== Conference South ==
Conference South
- Season: 2008–09
- Champions: AFC Wimbledon
- Promoted: AFC Wimbledon; Hayes & Yeading United
- Relegated: Bognor Regis Town; Fisher Athletic
- Matches: 462

A total of 22 teams contested the division, including 18 sides from last season, one transferred from the Conference North, two promoted from the Isthmian League and one promoted from the Southern Football League.

=== Promotion and relegation ===
Teams promoted from 2007–08 Southern League Premier Division

- Team Bath

Teams promoted from 2007–08 Isthmian League Premier Division

- Chelmsford City
- AFC Wimbledon

Teams transferred from 2007–08 Conference North

- Worcester City

No teams were relegated to the Conference South from the Conference Premier, so Worcester City were transferred in from the Conference North. The expulsion of two teams from the Conference North for financial reasons cancelled Redditch United's transfer between the two, and allowed Dorchester Town to remain in the Conference South. All the four new teams never played in Conference South before.

=== League table ===
Pos	Team	Pld	W	D	L	GF	GA	GD	Pts	Promotion, qualification or relegation
1	AFC Wimbledon (C, P)	42	26	10	6	86	36	+50	88	Promotion to Conference Premier
2	Hampton & Richmond Borough	42	25	10	7	74	37	+37	85	Qualification for the Conference South play-offs
3	Eastleigh	42	25	8	9	69	49	+20	83	Qualification for the Conference South play-offs
4	Hayes & Yeading United (O, P)	42	24	9	9	74	43	+31	81	Qualification for the Conference South play-offs
5	Chelmsford City	42	23	8	11	72	52	+20	77	Qualification for the Conference South play-offs
6	Maidenhead United	42	21	8	13	57	46	+11	71	
7	Welling United	42	19	11	12	61	44	+17	68	
8	Bath City	42	20	8	14	56	45	+11	68	
9	Bishop's Stortford	42	17	8	17	60	60	0	59	
10	Newport County	42	16	11	15	50	51	−1	59	
11	Team Bath	42	16	7	19	62	64	−2	55	Club folded
12	St Albans City	42	14	12	16	56	50	+6	54	
13	Bromley	42	15	9	18	60	64	−4	54	
14	Braintree Town	42	14	10	18	57	54	+3	52	
15	Havant & Waterlooville	42	11	15	16	59	58	+1	48	
16	Worcester City	42	12	11	19	38	53	−15	47	
17	Weston-super-Mare	42	12	11	19	43	68	−25	47	
18	Basingstoke Town	42	10	16	16	36	55	−19	46	
19	Dorchester Town	42	10	12	20	39	61	−22	42	
20	Thurrock	42	9	13	20	54	60	−6	40	
21	Bognor Regis Town (R)	42	7	12	23	33	68	−35	26 (Note: Bognor Regis Town were deducted 7 points for fielding an unregistered player.)	Relegation to the Isthmian League Premier Division
22	Fisher Athletic	42	5	3	34	22	100	−78	18	Club folded

Source: Football Conference
Rules for classification: 1) points; 2) goal difference; 3) number of goals scored.
(C) Champions; (O) Play-off winners; (P) Promoted; (R) Relegated

=== Locations ===
Locations of the Conference South 2008–09 teams

=== Results ===
Home \ Away	WIM	BAS	BAT	BST	BOG	BRA	BRO	CHE	DOR	EAS	FIS	H&R	H&W	H&Y	MDH	NPC	SAC	TBA	THU	WEL	WSM	WRC
AFC Wimbledon		1–0	3–2	4–1	3–1	5–1	3–1	3–1	2–0	0–2	3–0	1–1	3–0	2–0	3–1	3–0	3–0	2–0	2–1	0–1	1–1	2–0
Basingstoke Town	0–1		1–0	1–1	0–0	2–2	2–0	1–2	0–0	1–0	2–2	1–1	2–2	1–1	0–1	0–0	1–2	1–3	1–0	0–0	0–1	0–0
Bath City	2–2	1–0		2–3	0–1	3–2	1–3	2–1	2–0	1–1	1–0	0–1	2–1	0–1	1–0	2–1	1–0	1–1	2–2	0–4	3–0	1–0
Bishop's Stortford	0–1	3–2	0–2		2–0	0–3	1–1	2–1	0–2	3–4	0–1	1–3	1–0	0–0	2–0	1–1	1–1	4–3	2–1	0–1	2–1	3–0
Bognor Regis Town	1–5	2–3	0–2	0–2		0–2	1–1	2–1	0–0	1–0	2–1	0–1	1–5	1–1	2–4	0–1	0–5	3–0	1–1	0–0	1–1	1–2
Braintree Town	0–1	0–1	0–4	2–0	1–1		2–0	1–2	0–1	1–1	2–0	1–2	1–0	0–1	0–2	3–2	1–0	4–1	1–2	1–1	1–1	1–1
Bromley	2–2	0–2	1–1	1–0	1–0	1–4		2–2	1–0	5–1	3–0	0–2	2–2	1–0	1–2	2–1	2–3	4–0	3–3	1–3	3–0	0–2
Chelmsford City	3–2	2–2	2–3	3–3	2–0	1–1	0–1		2–1	3–0	3–0	3–2	1–2	2–1	2–1	0–0	1–1	1–1	3–2	2–0	4–1	2–0
Dorchester Town	1–1	0–0	0–2	0–2	1–0	2–2	2–1	0–1		0–4	3–0	0–1	1–0	1–2	0–3	0–1	1–1	2–2	4–3	1–1	1–2	3–1
Eastleigh	2–1	1–0	2–0	1–1	2–1	2–1	1–0	2–1	0–1		3–0	2–1	2–0	3–3	0–0	3–2	3–0	1–3	1–1	4–2	1–0	1–0
Fisher Athletic	0–3	1–0	1–0	0–3	0–1	0–2	0–2	0–1	4–0	1–2		0–2	1–1	0–5	0–1	1–3	0–4	0–6	0–3	0–5	0–2	0–1
Hampton & Richmond Borough	1–1	0–0	3–1	2–1	0–0	2–1	1–1	4–1	2–0	2–1	3–0		2–1	2–3	1–0	0–1	0–0	3–0	3–1	2–0	4–1	1–2
Havant & Waterlooville	0–0	5–1	0–0	3–0	2–2	1–1	0–1	1–1	1–2	2–2	3–0	1–4		2–2	3–3	1–1	2–0	2–1	2–2	1–0	2–3	0–2
Hayes & Yeading United	2–1	5–0	2–2	1–0	3–1	0–1	2–1	0–1	2–1	0–1	3–4	0–0	2–1		2–0	2–0	2–1	1–1	2–1	2–1	3–0	3–1
Maidenhead United	0–4	1–2	0–0	3–2	2–0	2–1	4–0	0–2	2–1	1–4	1–0	0–3	1–0	2–0		0–1	1–0	0–2	1–1	2–0	0–0	5–0
Newport County	1–4	3–0	0–4	0–1	2–1	2–1	3–0	3–1	4–4	0–1	4–0	1–0	0–2	1–5	0–1		0–1	4–2	1–1	0–0	1–0	1–0
St Albans City	0–0	3–0	2–1	2–0	1–0	0–3	4–5	1–2	2–0	5–0	4–1	2–2	1–1	1–1	1–2	1–1		0–0	0–2	2–3	3–0	0–2
Team Bath	1–2	1–2	0–1	2–2	1–0	0–3	0–3	2–0	4–1	1–3	4–1	0–2	1–0	4–1	0–2	2–0	2–0		4–1	0–1	1–2	0–2
Thurrock	0–1	6–0	2–0	1–3	1–1	1–0	1–1	0–1	1–0	0–1	2–1	3–3	2–3	0–1	1–2	0–0	0–0	1–2		1–2	0–1	2–0
Welling United	2–2	1–1	2–1	1–3	4–1	1–0	3–1	1–3	0–0	3–2	3–0	4–0	2–1	0–2	1–1	0–2	0–1	1–1	0–0		2–0	1–3
Weston-super-Mare	1–1	0–3	0–1	2–1	1–2	3–1	2–1	1–4	2–2	1–1	3–1	0–3	0–1	1–2	2–2	1–1	1–1	0–1	2–1	0–3		1–1
Worcester City	3–2	0–0	0–1	1–3	1–1	2–2	1–0	0–1	0–0	0–1	1–1	1–2	2–2	0–3	1–1	0–0	2–0	0–2	2–0	0–1	1–2	

Updated to match(es) played on unknown. Source: Sky Sports Football Yearbook 2009–2010. Glenda Rollin & Jack Rollin (eds.). Headline, 2009
Legend: Blue = home team win; Yellow = draw; Red = away team win.

=== Play-offs ===
Semifinals
5	Chelmsford City	1	0	1
2	Hampton & Richmond Borough	3	0	3
4	Hayes & Yeading United	2	4	6
3	Eastleigh	4	0	4

Final
2	Hampton & Richmond Borough	2
4	Hayes & Yeading United	3

==== Semifinals ====
28 April 2009
1st Leg

Chelmsford City	1–3	Hampton & Richmond Borough
Rainford 59'	Report	Yaku 44', 50'; Hodges 83'

Melbourne Stadium, Chelmsford
Attendance: 1,708
Referee: Crouch
2 May 2009
2nd Leg

Hampton & Richmond Borough	0–0	Chelmsford City
	Report

The Rocket Hospitality Beveree Stadium, Hampton
Attendance: 1,235

Hampton & Richmond Borough won 3–1 on Aggregate.

28 April 2009
1st Leg

Hayes & Yeading United	2–4	Eastleigh
Hendry 73' (pen.); Ruby 89'	Report	Taggart 5'; Williams 26'; Riviere 45'; Mulley 50' (o.g.)

Church Road, Hayes
Attendance: 517
2 May 2009
2nd Leg

Eastleigh	0–4 (a.e.t.)	Hayes & Yeading United
	Report	Perkins 45'; Hendry 81' (pen.); Fitzgerald 94', 97'

Ten Acres, Eastleigh
Attendance: 1,445

Hayes & Yeading United won 6–4 on Aggregate.

==== Play-Off Final ====
7 May 2009
19:45 BST

Hampton & Richmond Borough	2–3	Hayes & Yeading United
McAuley 49'; Hodges 69'	Report	Fitzgerald 8'; Gregory 71', 73'

The Rocket Hospitality Beveree Stadium, Hampton
Attendance: 3,500

=== Top goalscorers ===
Pos	Player	Team	Goals
1	(England) Jon Main	AFC Wimbledon	33
2	(England) Josh Scott	Hayes & Yeading United	22
3	(England) Warren McBean	Bromley	21
4	(Dominica) Richard Pacquette	Maidenhead United	20
5	(England) Charlie Sheringham	Welling United	19
6	(England) Paul Hakim	St Albans City	18
7	(England) Craig Reid	Newport County	15
7	(England) Dave Rainford	Chelmsford City	15
7	(England) Lawrence Yaku	Hampton & Richmond Borough	15
10	(Italy) Marco Adaggio	Worcester City	14
10	(England) Danny Hockton	Braintree Town	14
