= Max Christie (footballer) =

Scottish footballer (born 1971)

Personal information
- Full name: Martin Peter Christie
- Date of birth: 7 November 1971 (age 54)
- Place of birth: Edinburgh, Scotland
- Position: Midfielder

Youth career
- Salvesen BC
- Hutchison Vale

Senior career*
| Years | Team | Apps | (Gls) |
| 1987–1991 | Heart of Midlothian | 0 | (0) |
| 1989–1990 | → Meadowbank Thistle (loan) | 13 | (0) |
| 1991–1992 | Meadowbank Thistle | 34 | (1) |
| 1992 | South China AA | ? | (?) |
| 1992–1993 | Dundee | 5 | (0) |
| 1993–1999 | Stenhousemuir | 96 | (5) |
| 1999–2003 | Alloa Athletic | 100 | (2) |
| Total | | 248 | (8) |

International career
| 1992 | Scotland U21 | 3 | (0) |

Managerial career
- 2011–2014: Bonnyrigg Rose Athletic
- 2015–2017: Broxburn Athletic
- 2017–2019: Tranent Juniors
- 2019-2023: Bo'ness United
- 2023: Tranent Juniors
- * Club domestic league appearances and goals as of 20:27, 13 January 2018 (UTC)

Martin Peter "Max" Christie (born 7 November 1971), is a Scottish former professional footballer who played as a midfielder for several clubs in the Scottish Football League. He was most recently manager of Tranent Juniors in the Lowland League.

== Career ==
Christie began his senior career at Hearts, however he did not make a competitive appearance for the club and spent time on loan at Meadowbank Thistle under the management of his father Terry. He joined Meadowbank permanently in 1991 where his form earned him a move to the Premier Division with Dundee. Christie later rejoined his father at Stenhousemuir then again at Alloa Athletic before dropping down to Junior level with Arniston Rangers where he assumed a coaching role.

He was appointed manager of Bonnyrigg Rose Athletic in May 2011, winning the East Region Superleague and leading the side to the semi-finals of the Scottish Junior Cup, where they lost on penalties to Auchinleck Talbot, in his first season in charge. Christie resigned from his position at Bonnyrigg in at the end of August 2014 and joined Broxburn Athletic as assistant to Steve Pittman. He took charge of Broxburn in April 2015 following Pittmans resignation.

After resigning as Broxburn manager in November 2017, Christie again quickly re-entered the game as manager of Tranent Juniors the following month.

Christie was appointed as Bo'ness United manager in January 2019 and guided the club to promotion to the Lowland League after they were declared champions of the East of Scotland Premier Division in April 2020.

He resigned as Bo'ness United manager in March 2023, returning to Tranent for six matches before again resigning.

== Honours ==
=== Player ===
Alloa Athletic

- Scottish Challenge Cup 1999–2000
