= Graeme Armstrong =

Scottish footballer and manager

Personal information
- Date of birth: 23 June 1956 (age 70)
- Place of birth: Edinburgh, Scotland
- Positions: Defender; left winger

Youth career
- Haddington Athletic

Senior career*
Years	Team	Apps	(Gls)
1975	Meadowbank Thistle	1	(0)
1975–1981	Stirling Albion	204	(24)
1981–1984	Berwick Rangers	83	(12)
1983–1993	Meadowbank Thistle	353	(37)
1992–2000	Stenhousemuir	268	(4)
2000–2001	Alloa Athletic	1	(0)
Total		910	(77)

Managerial career
- 1999–2000: Stenhousemuir
- ?–2003: Alloa Athletic (assistant manager)
- 2005–2011: Newtongrange Star
- * Club domestic league appearances and goals

Graeme Armstrong (born 23 June 1956) is a Scottish retired footballer who played as a defender or left-winger. He is best known for the longevity of his playing career, which encompassed a Scottish record figure of 910 league appearances over a 26-year period between 1975 and 2001. Including cup matches, Armstrong is one of a select number of players who have amassed over 1,050 career appearances.

== Career ==
Born in Edinburgh, Armstrong began his career in the non-leagues in Scotland, including for Haddington Athletic, playing once as a trialist for Meadowbank Thistle, before being signed by Stirling Albion in 1975, making his league debut on 26 April 1975. Over the next 6 seasons, Armstrong played in 204 league games for Stirling Albion before being transferred to Berwick Rangers and then spending 10 years at Meadowbank Thistle.

He then moved on to Stenhousemuir, where he later broke Tommy Hutchison's British record of 863 league appearances. With Stenny, Armstrong lifted the Scottish Challenge Cup beating Dundee United in the 1995 final. He also played in the Scottish Cup giant-killing against Aberdeen in 1995.

Armstrong later became manager and guided the side to promotion. He was sacked in April 2000, with Stenhousemuir battling relegation. In 2005, Armstrong was voted Stenhousemuir's all-time cult hero by viewers of BBC's Football Focus.

Armstrong joined Alloa Athletic as assistant-manager, also registering as a player, the following day. He played just once for Alloa, as a substitute in April 2001, at the age of 44 years, before retiring. He was dismissed by Alloa in January 2003 as part of a drive to cut costs.

In 2007, he guided Newtongrange to the Scottish Junior Football Association's East Region, South Division championship and promotion to the Premier League. On 8 April, Graeme Armstrong resigned from his post as manager of Junior side Newtongrange Star after 6 years.

== Honours ==
=== Player ===
Stirling Albion

- Scottish Second Division: 1976–77

Meadowbank Thistle

- Scottish Second Division: 1986–87

Stenhousemuir

- Scottish Challenge Cup: 1995–96
- Scottish Third Division: Promoted 1998–99

=== Manager ===
Newtongrange Star

- SJFA East Region Premier League: Promoted 2008–09
- SJFA East Region South Division: 2006–07
- East Junior League Cup: 2008–09
- East Junior South League Cup: 2008–09

== See also ==
- List of footballers in Scotland by number of league appearances (500+)
- List of men's footballers with 1,000 or more official appearances
