= 2024–25 Scottish Junior Cup =

Tournament details
- Country: Scotland
- Teams: 127

Final positions
- Champions: Johnstone Burgh (3rd title)
- Runners-up: Tranent
- All statistics correct as of 20 January 2025.

The 2024–25 Scottish Junior Cup (known as the Call Robert Accident Repair Scottish Junior Cup for sponsorship reasons), was the 138th season of the Scottish Junior Cup, the national knockout tournament for member clubs of the Scottish Junior Football Association (SJFA). A total of 127 clubs entered the competition, fifteen more than in 2023–24.

Bo’ness United, Dunipace, Glasgow Perthshire, Livingston United, Neilston, Renfrew, Sauchie Juniors, and Tranent returned to take part in the competition while Drumchapel United, Easterhouse FA, Giffnock SC, Glasgow University, Glenvale, Inverkeithing Hillfield Swifts, Kilsyth Athletic, Thorn Athletic, West Park United, and Westdyke are competing for the first time. Maryhill, St Cadoc's, and Stoneywood-Parkvale did not enter.

Darvel were the reigning champions.

For 2025–26 the Scottish Junior Cup was rebranded to the Scottish Communities Cup.

== Calendar ==
The dates for each round of the 2024–25 tournament are as follows:

Round	Main date	Matches	Clubs
First round	~~31 August 2024~~; 21 September 2024	1	127 → 126
Second round	21 September 2024	62	126 → 64
Third round	19 October 2024	32	64 → 32
Fourth round	23 November 2024	16	32 → 16
Fifth round	14 December 2024	8	16 → 8
Quarter-finals	18 January 2025	4	8 → 4
Semi-finals	April & May 2025	2	4 → 2
Final	1 June 2025	1	2 → 1

Drawn matches proceed direct to a penalty shootout, with no extra time. The semi-finals are played home and away over two legs.

== First round ==
The 20 clubs taking part in the Scottish Cup — Auchinleck Talbot, Beith Juniors, Benburb, Bo’ness United, Camelon Juniors, Carluke Rovers, Culter, Cumnock Juniors, Darvel, Dundee North End, Dunipace, Glasgow University, Glenafton Athletic, Irvine Meadow XI, Lochee United, Pollok, Rutherglen Glencairn, Sauchie Juniors, Tayport, and Tranent — received a bye into the second round draw. The winners of the first round tie progress to the third round draw.

Home team	Score	Away team
21 September 2024
Cruden Bay	1–9	Neilston

== Fourth round ==
=== Matches ===
Home team	Score	Away team
30 November 2024
Arthurlie	2–4	Darvel
Bathgate Thistle	0–3	Glenafton Athletic
Dundee East Craigie	0–7	Largs Thistle
Lugar Boswell Thistle	4–2	Larkhall Thistle
Montrose Roselea	1–3	Beith Juniors
Vale of Leven	0–4	Johnstone Burgh
Pollok	4–2	Cumbernauld United
Armadale Thistle	1–1 (4–2 p)	Hurlford United
Benburb	2–0	Hermes
Camelon Juniors	6–0	Letham
Drumchapel United	6–0	Burghead Thistle
Easterhouse	1–2	Kilbirnie Ladeside
Tranent	3–0	West Park United
14 December 2024
Troon	1–1 (5–4 p)	Lochee United
18 January 2025
Irvine Meadow XI	4–2	West Calder United
No date
Bo'ness United	– (Note: Tie awarded to Dundee Downfield after they refused to play the tie on any day other than a Saturday and Bo'ness were unable to fulfill the fixture due to scheduling conflicts.)	Dundee Downfield

== Fifth round ==
=== Matches ===
Home team	Score	Away team
14 December 2024
Beith Juniors	1–3	Largs Thistle
Lugar Boswell Thistle	0–4	Benburb
Darvel	2–3	Johnstone Burgh
18 January 2025
Camelon Juniors	1–0	Kilbirnie Ladeside
Tranent	4–3	Glenafton Athletic
Troon	1–1 (3–5 p)	Armadale Thistle
8 February 2025
Dundee Downfield	1–1 (1–4 p)	Drumchapel United
15 February 2025
Irvine Meadow XI	1–1 (3–2 p)	Pollok

== Quarter-finals ==
Home team	Score	Away team
15 February 2025
Largs Thistle	1–0	Armadale Thistle
Drumchapel United	3–0	Benburb
8 March 2025
Johnstone Burgh	0–0 (4–2 p)	Irvine Meadow XI
26 March 2025
Camelon Juniors	2–2 (3–4 p)	Tranent

== Semi-finals ==
=== First leg ===
19 April 2025
17:30

Johnstone Burgh	0–1	Largs Thistle
		Hughes 83'

Keanie Park, Johnstone

26 April 2025
17:30

Tranent	3–1	Drumchapel United
Brett 2' (pen.), 84' (pen.); Doan 35'		Hopkirk 68' (pen.)

Forresters Park, Tranent
Referee: Lewis Hogarth

=== Second leg ===
3 May 2025
17:30

Drumchapel United	1–0	Tranent
Hopkirk 74' (pen.)

Holm Park, Clydebank

Tranent won 3-2 on aggregate.

18 May 2025
14:00

Largs Thistle	0–2	Johnstone Burgh
		Diver 15'; Mason 77'

Barrfields Stadium, Largs

Johnstone Burgh won 1–2 on aggregate.

== Final ==
The Final of the Scottish Junior Cup was played at Broadwood Stadium, Cumbernauld on Sunday 1 June.

1 June 2025
16:05

Johnstone Burgh	1–1	Tranent
Diver 74'	Report	Girdwood 43'; S. Gray (yellow card) 51' (yellow-red card) 77'
Penalties
Mullen (penalty scored); Diver (penalty scored); Davidson (penalty scored); Lafferty (penalty scored)	4–2	Brett (penalty missed); Miller (penalty scored); Bauld (penalty missed); McIntyre (penalty scored)

Broadwood Stadium, Cumbernauld
Attendance: 4,538
Referee: Cameron Stirling
