= Ian Little (footballer) =

Scottish footballer and manager

Personal information
- Full name: Ian Little
- Date of birth: 10 December 1973 (age 52)
- Place of birth: Edinburgh, Scotland
- Position: Midfielder

Youth career
- 1990: Meadowbank Thistle

Senior career*
Years	Team	Apps	(Gls)
1990–1995	Meadowbank Thistle	175	(33)
1995–1998	Stenhousemuir	101	(38)
1998–2000	Livingston	18	(1)
1999	→ Alloa Athletic (loan)	20	(4)
2000–2004	Alloa Athletic	139	(24)
2004–2012	Berwick Rangers	164	(24)
Total		616	(124)

Managerial career
- 2011–2014: Berwick Rangers
- 2018–2019: Whitehill Welfare
- 2019–2021: Berwick Rangers
- 2023: Bo'ness United
- 2023–2024: Tranent
- * Club domestic league appearances and goals

Ian Little (born 10 December 1973) is a Scottish football coach and former player who was most recently manager of Tranent Juniors.

== Career ==
Starting his career with Meadowbank Thistle, Little appeared in a Scotland u-18 national team fixture vs the Republic of Ireland at the age of 16, which coincided with a run of five goals in his first seven first team matches. He want on to make 200 appearances for Thistle in all competitions, before moving on to represent Stenhousemuir, Livingston, Alloa Athletic, and Berwick Rangers.

Little had spells as manager of Vale of Leithen, Heriot Watt University, Livingston Under 20s, a brief caretaker role at Tranent Juniors, Whitehill Welfare, and Berwick Rangers.

Little was made caretaker manager of Berwick Rangers after Jimmy Crease left the club in October 2011. After some good results, Berwick announced in mid-November that Little would stay in charge until 31 December, when matters will be re-assessed. On 28 December 2011, Berwick Rangers announced that Little would remain as manager until at least the end of the 2011–12 season. On 17 March 2012, Berwick Rangers announced that Little would remain as manager at least until the end of the 2012–13 season. Berwick finished 4th in the 2012–13 Scottish Third Division, but lost to East Fife in the promotion/relegation play-offs. Little left Berwick in January 2014, with the club citing its lowly league position as the reason for making a managerial change.

After a spell as manager of Lowland League club Whitehill Welfare, Little returned to Berwick in May 2019 as assistant to John Brownlie, before returning to his role as manager a month later.

Berwick parted company with Little on 28 May 2021.

Little was appointed assistant manager of Bo'ness United in July 2022.

== Managerial statistics ==
As of 13 January 2014

Team	Nat	From	To	Record				
Team	Nat	From	To	G	W	D	L	Win %
Berwick Rangers	(Scotland)	December 2011	January 2014	88	30	23	35	34.09

== Honours ==
=== Player ===
Stenhousemuir

- Scottish Challenge Cup 1995–96

Alloa Athletic

- Scottish Challenge Cup 1999–2000
