= Hugh Wilson (football manager) =

Scottish football manager

Hugh Wilson (c. 1934 – 2 September 1992) was a Scottish football manager, who worked for Alloa Athletic and Cowdenbeath.

Wilson worked as chief scout for Alloa Athletic for 10 years until he was appointed manager in October 1974. He guided Alloa to promotion in 1976–77, but the club was relegated in 1977–78. Wilson resigned as Alloa manager near to the end of the 1979–80 season, and was replaced by Alex Totten. He then worked as chief scout for Falkirk for two years before being appointed manager of Cowdenbeath.

Wilson was from Ballingry. He died in Kirkcaldy on 2 September 1992 at the age of 58.
