= Gavin Cadwallader =

English footballer

Personal information
- Full name: Gavin James Cadwallader
- Date of birth: 18 April 1986 (age 40)
- Place of birth: Shrewsbury, England
- Positions: Defender; midfielder

Youth career
- 1997–2006: Shrewsbury Town

Senior career*
Years	Team	Apps	(Gls)
2006–2007	Shrewsbury Town	2	(0)
2007–2008	Aberystwyth Town	32	(3)
2008–2011	Newtown	60	(11)
2011–2012	Airbus UK Broughton	15	(1)
2012–2013	Aberystwyth Town	29	(0)
2013–2014	Cefn Druids		
2015–2017	Newtown	22	(0)
- * Club domestic league appearances and goals

Gavin James Cadwallader (born 18 April 1986) is an English retired footballer. He played primarily as a central defender, and could be utilised in a midfield holding role. Cadwallader played two matches for Shrewsbury Town in League Two in 2006 and spent the rest of his career in the Welsh Premier League.

== Career ==
Born in Shrewsbury, Cadwallader began his career as a trainee with Shrewsbury Town. He made his professional debut in the 2–2 League Two draw at Carlisle United on 14 February 2006, as an 81st-minute substitute for Mark Stallard. His second and final match of the season came in the 1–1 draw at Grimsby Town on 15 April, coming on for Glynn Hurst in the last minute.

At the end of the season, following the completion of his three-year scholarship programme, he was handed a professional contract despite failing to convince club manager Gary Peters of his worth. Peters said, "[He] was injured most of the way through it so last year I gave a year pro contract to see if he could prove himself. He's not convinced me yet but is a late developer so I've given him another year to prove himself."

In January 2007, Cadwallader was released by Shrewsbury, along with fellow squad player Marco Adaggio. He played for Kidderminster Harriers reserves in late January, but signed for League of Wales club Aberystwyth Town on 23 February 2007.

In August 2008 Cadwallader signed for Newtown. He also worked as Shrewsbury's under-13 coach. Despite interest from Prestatyn Town, he signed a new contract with the club in June 2010.

He moved to Airbus UK Broughton in January 2011 but was released by the club in May 2012. He re-signed for Aberystwyth, and then moved on again to play for Cefn Druids, before departing to re-join Newtown in January transfer window of 2015. He was affected by injury in his later seasons and retired in June 2017, immediately being appointed a Newtown coach by manager Chris Hughes.
