= Mark Cairns (footballer) =

Scottish footballer (born 1969)

Personal information
- Date of birth: 25 September 1969 (age 57)
- Place of birth: Edinburgh, Scotland
- Position: Goalkeeper

Youth career
- Gala Fairydean

Senior career*
Years	Team	Apps	(Gls)
1988–1991	Heart of Midlothian	0	(0)
1988	→ Berwick Rangers (loan)	4	(0)
1989	→ East Stirlingshire (loan)	6	(0)
1991–1994	Gala Fairydean		
1994–1997	Partick Thistle	14	(0)
1997–2001	Alloa Athletic	107	(0)
2001–2003	Brechin City	37	(0)
2003	Queen's Park	13	(0)
2003–2004	Bo'ness United		
2004–2005	Stirling Albion	0	(0)
2005–2006	Arbroath	3	(0)
2006–2008	Queen's Park	35	(0)
- * Club domestic league appearances and goals

Mark Cairns (born 25 September 1969) is a Scottish football goalkeeper, who played for Heart of Midlothian, Berwick Rangers, East Stirlingshire, Gala Fairydean, Partick Thistle, Alloa Athletic, Brechin City, Queen's Park, Stirling Albion and Arbroath.

While at Alloa Cairns played in the 1999 Scottish Challenge Cup Final. The match went to penalties; Cairns saved two and also scored one himself as they defeated Inverness Caledonian Thistle.

== Honours ==
=== Player ===
Alloa Athletic

- Scottish Challenge Cup 1999–2000
