= 2001–02 Scottish Second Division =

Scottish Second Division
- Season: 2001–02
- Champions: Queen of the South
- Promoted: Queen of the South; Alloa Athletic
- Relegated: Greenock Morton

The 2001–02 Scottish Second Division was won by Queen of the South who, along with second-placed Alloa Athletic, were promoted to the First Division. Greenock Morton were relegated to the Third Division. Stenhousemuir avoided relegation due to First Division Airdrieonians becoming insolvent, meaning that only one team was relegated from each of the First and Second divisions. This was also the last year that Clydebank would play in the Scottish Football League and were replaced by Airdrie United next season.

== Table ==
Pos	Team	Pld	W	D	L	GF	GA	GD	Pts	Promotion or relegation
1	Queen of the South (C, P)	36	20	7	9	64	42	+22	67	Promotion to the First Division
2	Alloa Athletic (P)	36	15	14	7	55	33	+22	59	Promotion to the First Division
3	Forfar Athletic	36	15	8	13	51	47	+4	53	
4	Clydebank (Note: Clydebank folded at the end of the season; their place in the Scottish Football League was subsequently purchased by Airdrie United for the following season.)	36	14	9	13	44	45	−1	51	Club folded after the season
5	Hamilton Academical	36	13	9	14	49	44	+5	48	
6	Berwick Rangers	36	12	11	13	44	52	−8	47	
7	Stranraer	36	10	15	11	48	51	−3	45	
8	Cowdenbeath	36	11	11	14	49	51	−2	44	
9	Stenhousemuir (Note: Stenhousemuir were reprieved from relegation due to Aidrieonians folding.)	36	8	12	16	33	57	−24	36	
10	Greenock Morton (R)	36	7	14	15	48	63	−15	35	Relegation to the Third Division

Source: "2001-2002 Second Division - SPFL Archive". SPFL.
Rules for classification: 1) points; 2) goal difference; 3) number of goals scored.
(C) Champions; (P) Promoted; (R) Relegated

== Attendances ==
The average attendances for Scottish Second Division clubs for season 2001/02 are shown below:

Club	Average
Hamilton Academical	2,011
Queen of the South	1,891
Greenock Morton	1.249
Alloa Athletic	632
Berwick Rangers	509
Forfar Athletic	506
Stenhousemuir	476
Stranraer	455
Cowdenbeath	368
Clydebank	352
