= Adrian Sprott =

Scottish footballer (1962–2023)

Personal information
- Date of birth: 23 March 1962
- Place of birth: Edinburgh, Scotland
- Date of death: 10 June 2023 (aged 61)
- Positions: Defender; winger

Youth career
- North Merchiston Boys Club

Senior career*
Years	Team	Apps	(Gls)
1979–1985	Meadowbank Thistle	198	(52)
1985–1988	Hamilton Academical	85	(11)
1988–1993	Meadowbank Thistle	124	(9)
1993–1999	Stenhousemuir	186	(27)
Total		593	(99)
- * Club domestic league appearances and goals

Adrian Sprott (23 March 1962 – 10 June 2023) was a Scottish footballer who played as a defender or winger for Meadowbank Thistle, Hamilton Academical and Stenhousemuir.

Sprott played for Hamilton in the Scottish Premier Division as a semi-professional player, as he combined his football career with working for Lothian & Borders Police. During that period, Sprott scored a goal that knocked Rangers out of the Scottish Cup in a famous cup upset. It also ended a British record period of Rangers goalkeeper Chris Woods not conceding a goal.

Sprott died on 10 June 2023, at the age of 61.

== Honours ==
=== Player ===
Stenhousemuir

- Scottish Challenge Cup 1995–96
