= Sean Murphy (footballer, born 1995) =

Scottish footballer (born 1995)

Personal information
- Date of birth: 8 January 1995 (age 31)
- Place of birth: Scotland
- Position: Midfielder

Team information
- Current team: Bonnyrigg Rose Athletic
- Number: 6

Youth career
- Livingston

Senior career*
Years	Team	Apps	(Gls)
2014–2016	Leith Athletic		
2016–2018	Musselburgh Athletic		
2018–2019	Berwick Rangers	12	(0)
2019–2024	Tranent Juniors		
2024–	Bonnyrigg Rose	23	(0)
- * Club domestic league appearances and goals as of 21 December 2024

Sean Murphy (born 8 January 1995) is a Scottish footballer who plays as a midfielder for Lowland League East club Bonnyrigg Rose.

== Career ==
Murphy started his career in the youth academy of Livingston but was released in 2014 by then Livi manager John McGlynn.

He signed for Leith Athletic following his release from Livi and was part of the side that won the King Cup in 2015–2016.

Following a successful spell at Leith Athletic, Murphy signed for Musselburgh Athletic in 2016. During his two seasons at the Burgh, Murphy caught the eye of then Berwick Rangers manager Robbie Horn who signed him for the 2018–2019 season. He made his debut for the Wee Gers in a 4–0 Scottish League Cup defeat against Annan on 17 July 2018.

Murphy signed for Tranent Juniors in 2019 and went on to be part of the season to win the 2021–22 East of Scotland Football League.

On 6 May 2024, Sean announced he was leaving Tranent Juniors after 5 seasons with the newly lowland club and he was moving onto joining Bonnyrigg Rose on a pre-contract.

== Honours ==
Tranent Juniors

- East of Scotland Football League : 2021–22
