= Farewell America: The Plot to Kill JFK =

- Author: James Hepburn (pseudonym)
- Original title: L'Amérique brûle
- Subject: Assassination of John F. Kennedy; conspiracy theories
- Genre: Political non-fiction
- Publisher: Nouvelles Frontières (France)
- Publication date: 1968

Farewell America: The Plot to Kill JFK (French: L'Amérique brûle, lit. "America Is Burning") is a 1968 political book about the assassination of John F. Kennedy. Published under the pseudonym James Hepburn, the work advances a conspiracy theory alleging that Kennedy was killed by a coalition of political, military, and economic elites rather than by a lone gunman.

== Background and publication ==
The book was first published in France in 1968 under the title L'Amérique brûle. The identity of the author or authors remains unknown, as "James Hepburn" is widely considered a pseudonym. A 2012 article by University of Georgia law professor Donald E. Wilkes Jr. stated "James Hepburn" was the "pen name of a French intelligence service official". According to Publishers Weekly, the authors "conducted clandestine research among KGB and Interpol agents and French petroleum espionage specialists and relied on a rare, unmodified print of the famed Zapruder film".

Journalist Warren Hinckle in his 1974 autobiography stated the book's French publishing company Frontières planned to publish it in the United States, but it never made it for "reasons best known to [Frontières]". In 2002 it was published in the United States by Penmarin Books.

== Content ==
The book rejects the findings of the Warren Commission, which concluded that Lee Harvey Oswald acted alone in assassinating President Kennedy. Instead, it proposes that the assassination was carried out by a clandestine group allegedly composed of elements of the U.S. Intelligence Community, military officials, business and financial elites, organized crime figures and Cuban exile groups.

== Reception ==
The book attracted significant attention in Europe upon publication. A 1968 review in Le Monde noted it "stands out" from the genre of books focused on conspiracies related to the Kennedy family, though that "we close the book without knowing the answers" to many of the questions it poses.

A later Publishers Weekly summary described it as "a once-notorious, now-dated look at John Kennedy's assassination and an excoriation of the American scene in its aftermath".

== See also ==
- John F. Kennedy assassination conspiracy theories
