= Marco Adaggio =

English footballer (b. 1987)

Personal information
- Date of birth: 6 October 1987 (age 39)
- Place of birth: Málaga, Spain
- Position: Striker

Youth career
- Shrewsbury Town

Senior career*
Years	Team	Apps	(Gls)
2004–2007	Shrewsbury Town	10	(0)
2006	→ AFC Telford United (loan)	3	(0)
2007	Bangor City	8	(2)
2007–2008	Stafford Rangers	24	(6)
2008–2010	Worcester City	33	(15)
2010–2011	Redditch United		
2011	Nantwich Town		
201?–201?	Rushall Olympic		
201?–201?	Newcastle Town		
201?–2013	Ellesmere Rangers	3	(1)
2013	AFC Telford United	6	(0)
2013	Chasetown	5	(3)
2013–2014	Ellesmere Rangers	38	(40)
2014–2016	Hinckley	47	(35)
2016	Chasetown		
2016–2019	Highgate United		
2019–2020	Worcester City		
2020–2022	Ellesmere Rangers		
- * Club domestic league appearances and goals

Marco Adaggio (born 6 October 1987) is an English-Italian retired footballer who played as a striker.

== Career ==
Born to Italian and English parents in Málaga, Spain, Adaggio moved to Shropshire, England aged 11, having spent his earlier childhood in Naples and Rimini, Italy. He joined the Centre of Excellence of local club Shrewsbury Town.

Adaggio made his club début on 2 April 2005 in the 3–0 home win over Oxford United. On 18 April 2006 he made his tenth appearance for "the Shrews", all of which came as a substitute. Earlier in the season he had spent time on loan to local rivals AFC Telford United. At the end of the season, two years into his three-year scholarship programme, he was handed a professional contract.

Despite a few first team appearances for the club, Adaggio was unable to command a regular first-team place, and in January 2007 he was released by the club, along with fellow squad player Gavin Cadwallader. He subsequently joined Bangor City. At the end of the 2006–07 season, he was released by the club, and moved to Stafford Rangers.

After a summer-long trial at Kidderminster Harriers, Adaggio joined Worcester City in August 2008.

At the end of the 2008–09 season, Adaggio finished as the club's top scorer with 15 goals and signed a new one-year deal at the club. However, this was on reduced terms due to cost-cutting measures.

On 6 March 2013 he rejoined AFC Telford United until the end of the season. On 11 May 2013 he was released by Telford with five other players.

After being released by Telford, he joined up with Chasetown in pre season. He then agreed a deal for the upcoming season.

Having taken a step down to concentrate on a career in coaching, scoring 40 goals in 38 appearances while playing for Ellesmere Rangers in the West Midlands Regional League, Adaggio signed for Hinckley for the 2014–15 season. Adaggio played two seasons for the newly formed club eventually scoring 48 goals in a total of 60 appearances, before moving back to Chasetown in March 2016.
