= 1995–96 Scottish Challenge Cup =

Tournament details
- Country: Scotland
- Teams: 30

Final positions
- Champions: Stenhousemuir
- Runners-up: Dundee United

Tournament statistics
- Matches played: 29
- Goals scored: 82 (2.83 per match)

The 1995–96 Scottish Challenge Cup was the sixth season of the competition, competed for by the 30 member clubs of the Scottish Football League. The previous champions were Airdrieonians, who defeated Dundee 3–2 after extra in the 1994 final; and lost on penalties in the Second round after a 2–2 draw with Hamilton Academical.

The final was played on 5 November 1995, between Stenhousemuir and Dundee United at McDiarmid Park in Perth. Stenhousemuir won 5–4 penalties after a 0–0 draw after extra time, to win the tournament for the first time.

== Schedule ==
Round	First match date	Fixtures	Clubs
First round	Sat/Tue/Wed 19/22/23 August 1995	14	30 → 16
Second round	Mon/Tue/Wed 11/12/13 September 1995	8	16 → 8
Quarter-finals	Mon/Tue/Wed 25/26/27 September 1995	4	8 → 4
Semi-finals	Wednesday 4 October 1995	2	4 → 2
Final	Sunday 5 November 1995	1	2 → 1

== First round ==
Cowdenbeath and Stenhousemuir received random byes into the second round.

19 August 1995	Albion Rovers	2* – 2 (a.e.t.)	Ross County	Cliftonhill, Coatbridge
	Albion Rovers won on penalties

22 August 1995	Ayr United	1 – 2 (a.e.t.)	Dunfermline Athletic	Somerset Park, Ayr

22 August 1995	Clyde	0–2	St Johnstone	Broadwood, Cumbernauld

22 August 1995	Clydebank	2–0	Arbroath	Kilbowie Park, Clydebank

22 August 1995	Dumbarton	0–1	Brechin City	Boghead Park, Dumbarton

22 August 1995	East Fife	2–4	Dundee
Bayview Park, Methil

22 August 1995	East Stirlingshire	0–3	St Mirren	Firs Park, Falkirk

22 August 1995	Hamilton Academical	2* – 2 (a.e.t.)	Airdrieonians	Firhill Stadium, Glasgow
	Hamilton Academical won on penalties

22 August 1995	Caledonian Thistle	1–2	Alloa Athletic	Telford Street Park, Inverness

22 August 1995	Montrose	2–1	Berwick Rangers	Links Park, Montrose

22 August 1995	Queen of the South	0–1	Forfar Athletic	Palmerston Park, Dumfries

22 August 1995	Stirling Albion	3–0	Queen's Park	Forthbank Stadium, Stirling

23 August 1995	Livingston	1–0	Greenock Morton	Meadowbank Stadium, Edinburgh

23 August 1995	Stranraer	0–2	Dundee United	Stair Park, Stranraer

Source: SFL

== Second round ==
11 September 1995	Dundee	3–0	Cowdenbeath	Dens Park, Dundee

12 September 1995	Albion Rovers	1–3	Brechin City	Cliftonhill, Coatbridge

12 September 1995	Alloa Athletic	2–4	Stirling Albion	Recreation Park, Alloa

12 September 1995	Clydebank	3–0	St Johnstone	Kilbowie Park, Clydebank

12 September 1995	Dundee United	3–0	Hamilton Academical	Tannadice Park, Dundee

12 September 1995	Dunfermline Athletic	2–1	Forfar Athletic	East End Park, Dunfermline

12 September 1995	Stenhousemuir	3–1	Montrose	Ochilview Park, Stenhousemuir

13 September 1995	Livingston	2–0	St Mirren	Meadowbank Stadium, Edinburgh

Source: SFL

== Quarter-finals ==
25 September 1995

Dundee	1–3	Stenhousemuir

Dens Park, Dundee

26 September 1995

Clydebank	0–1	Dundee United

Kilbowie Park, Clydebank

26 September 1995

Dunfermline Athletic	2–0	Brechin City

East End Park, Dunfermline

27 September 1995

Livingston	1–1 (a.e.t.)	Stirling Albion
		Stirling Albion won on penalties

Meadowbank Stadium, Edinburgh

== Semi-finals ==
4 October 1995

Dunfermline Athletic	0–4	Dundee United

East End Park, Dunfermline

4 October 1995

Stirling Albion	1–2	Stenhousemuir

Forthbank Stadium, Stirling

== Final ==
5 November 1995
15:00

Stenhousemuir	0–0 (a.e.t.)	Dundee United
	Report
Penalties
	5–4

McDiarmid Park, Perth
Attendance: 7,856
Referee: John Rowbotham
