= Tranent F.C. =

Association football club in Scotland

Tranent
- Full name: Tranent Football Club
- Nicknames: The Belters, The Big T
- Founded: 1911 (as Tranent Juniors F.C.)
- Ground: Foresters Park; Tranent
- Capacity: 2,300 (44 seated)
- Manager: Robbie Horn
- League: Lowland League East
- 2025–26: Lowland League, 4th of 18
- Website: www.tranentfc.co.uk
Home colours	Away colours

Tranent Football Club is a Scottish football club based in the town of Tranent, East Lothian. They currently play in the fifth tier of Scottish Football in the Lowland League East.

The majority of the clubs history was spent in the Scottish Junior Football Association from its foundation in 1911 as Tranent Juniors, until 2018 when the club made the decision to move to the East of Scotland Football League.

== History ==
The club was originally named Tranent Juniors, however following an announcement of a merger with Tranent Colts in February 2023, the club was renamed Tranent Football Club from the 2023–24 season. Their home ground is Foresters Park and club colours are maroon and white.

The club crest pays tribute to the towns history of agriculture on the left side and coal-mining on the right and is complete with a banner of the clubs motto 'Lie Forrit'.

Tranent competed in the Scottish Junior Football Association (SJFA) from its inception in 1911 up until 2018. However, the club has taken part in the Scottish Junior Cup since 2018 due rules being relaxed within the SJFA.

Tranent have reached three Scottish Junior Cup finals in their history. In 1933 they lost 4-2 to Yoker Athletic at Hampden Park, this result came as a result of a replay following the first game finishing goalless at Tynecastle Park.

Two years later Tranent won the Scottish Junior Cup which many still regard as the clubs greatest honour. They defeated Petershill 6-1 at Ibrox Stadium in front of a crowd of 22,000. This result remains the joint record victory in a Junior Cup final.

In more recent times, despite leaving the SJFA, the club reached the final in 2025 and came up against Johnstone Burgh. The game ended 1-1 with Johnstone Burgh winning 4-2 on penalties at Broadwood Stadium.

Before the start of the 2018-19 season, a host of Junior clubs, including Tranent, moved across to the East of Scotland Football League to join the recently established Scottish Football Pyramid. This presented clubs the opportunity to potentially gain promotion to the SPFL creating an increase from 13 teams to 39.

=== East of Scotland Football League (2018–2022) ===
Following the increase of teams into the East of Scotland Football League, a decision was reached to separate the clubs into three parallel conferences of 13 teams in each.

In Tranent's debut 2018–19 season they finished 3rd place in Conference B which saw them qualify for the newly established East of Scotland Premier League the following season. Max Christie was in charge until late January 2019 before leaving to join conference rivals Bo'ness United, with Calvin Shand managing the team to conclude the season.

The 2019–20 season saw the competition come to an abrupt end due to the outbreak the Coronavirus pandemic. The season was suspended and then eventually curtailed with a points per game system adopted to determine each clubs finishing position. This resulted in the Belters finishing 4th place with Bo'ness United promoted as champions to the Lowland League. Shortly before the league was suspended, Calvin Shand departed the club and was replaced by Johnny Harvey as manager.

The start of the 2020–21 season was delayed until October 2020 due to continuing global issues surrounding the coronavirus. Before proceedings got underway Tranent announced that Johnny Harvey had left the club . Harvey disputed this claiming he was sacked following a heated argument with a member of the clubs committee.

Tranent went on to appoint Calum Elliot as manager. The season only lasted until 11 January 2021 before having to be suspended, again, due to pandemic issues. On 11 April 2021 a vote was held with clubs deciding to 'null and void' the season. At that time Tranent sat top of the Premier League with 12 games played and were undefeated.

In season 2021–22 under the guidance of Elliott, Tranent won the East of Scotland Premier League title by pipping Penicuik Athletic due to a far superior goal difference, after both sides finished the season on 80 points. In a round robin play-off for promotion to the Lowland Football League, Tranent defeated Darvel 2-0 away and St Cuthbert Wanderers 7-0 at Foresters Park to secure promotion to the fifth tier.

=== Lowland Football League (2022–present) ===
In their debut 2022–23 Lowland Football League season, Tranent went on to finish a very respectable 5th place in the table. This was despite further managerial disruption with Calum Elliott departing the club in late August. Elliott felt it would be best for both the club and himself to part ways and was replaced by Colin Nish. The Spartans would go on to win the title and eventually SPFL promotion via the play-offs.

Max Christie returned to the dugout for a second managerial spell with the Belters to begin the 2023–24 season. This was due to the board not renewing Colin Nish's contract at the end of the previous season. Having stabilised the club, Christie took up a position on the clubs committee and Ian Little took the reins from the 1st September. Tranent went on to replicate the season before with another 5th place finish as East Kilbride stormed to the championship title.

In the season's Lowland League Cup final, Tranent faced East Kilbride at Broadwood Stadium and twice came from behind with goals scored by Dean Brett and Kallum Higginbotham as the game ended 2-2. A tense penalty shootout followed with the Belters winning the cup 5-4 on penalties as goalkeeper Kelby Mason got the plaudits.

The 2024–25 season saw a familiar story emerge in the dugout as Ian Little departed in August hours before Tranent were due to take on Bo'ness United in their third league match of the season. Jonny Stewart was announced as the manager on 3rd September and remained in place until 13th March 2025 when Bonnyrigg Rose approached the club about their own managerial vacancy. Reluctantly, Tranent allowed talks to take place and Stewart left the club. Robbie Horn was appointed manager but didn't take control until the end of the season, the remainder was overseen by caretaker boss, Darren Smith.

Despite the turmoil off the pitch, the team had another impressive season on it and finished 4th place in the table. East Kilbride would go on to win the title again and this time secure their place in the SPFL via the play-offs.

In Horn's first season as manager the club had a fantastic 2025–26 season which saw them compete right up until the last few weeks for the league championship before falling short. With forward Cameron McKinley in rich form throughout the season with 18 goals, it was another 4th place finish for the team with Linlithgow Rose winning the title on the final day.

At the end of the season, the club announced various plans and efforts of fund raising to improve the facilities at Foresters Park with a view of reaching the SPFL within the next 5-years. The aim is to raise £200,000 in order to help achieve this whilst remaining competitive on the pitch.

== Current squad ==
As of 25 June 2026

Note: Flags indicate national team as defined under FIFA eligibility rules; some limited exceptions apply. Players may hold more than one non-FIFA nationality.

No.	Pos.	Nation	Player
—	GK	SCO	Kelby Mason
—	GK	SCO	Roan Flanagan
—	DF	SCO	Euan Bauld (Captain)
—	DF	SCO	Euan Greig
—	DF	SCO	Dean Brett
—	DF	SCO	Liam Hall
—	DF	SCO	Robbie McIntyre
—	DF	SCO	Nick Aitchison
—	DF	SCO	Sam Buchanan
—	MF	SCO	Corey Thomson
—	MF	SCO	Finn Montgomery
—	MF	SCO	Scott Gray (Vice Captain)

No.	Pos.	Nation	Player
—	MF	SCO	Conor Doan
—	MF	SCO	Harry Gordon
—	MF	SCO	Ben Miller
—	MF	SCO	Ryan Murray
—	MF	SCO	Sean Murphy
—	FW	SCO	Greig Spence
—	FW	SCO	Harry Girdwood
—	FW	SCO	Jack Duncan
—	FW	SCO	Jamie McMurdo
—	FW	SCO	Tiwi Daramola
—	FW	SCO	Guy McGarry

== Managers (Senior Leagues) ==
Information is from 2018/19 season onwards when Tranent moved from the SJFA to the senior leagues.

Key

- M = matches played; W = matches won; D = matches drawn; L = matches lost; Win % = percentage of total matches won

Name	From	To	M	W	D	L	Win %
(Scotland) Max Christie	08/12/2017	30/01/2019	26	18	2	6	69.23
(Scotland) Calvin Shand	07/02/2019	03/02/2020	42	27	5	10	64.28
(Scotland) Johnny Harvey	10/02/2020	24/09/2020	3	1	0	2	33.33
(Scotland) Calum Elliot	26/09/2020	24/08/2022	60	43	10	7	71.66
(Scotland) Colin Nish	31/08/2022	07/05/2023	37	19	6	12	51.35
(Scotland) Max Christie (2)	10/05/2023	25/08/2023	10	5	2	3	50.00
(Scotland) Ian Little	25/08/2023	06/08/2024	47	26	8	13	55.31
(Scotland) Jonny Stewart	06/08/2024	13/03/2025	37	19	8	10	51.35
(Scotland) Robbie Horn	02/06/2025	Present	72	46	12	14	63.88

- Max Christie was the manager for a period prior to move to senior leagues. These stats are not included.
- At 21/11/2026

== Top Scorers (Lowland League Onwards) ==
Top scorers for the club since promotion to the Lowland Football League in 2022.

- Friendlies and penalty shoot-out goals excluded

	Player	Goals
1	(Scotland) Cameron Ross	46
2	(Scotland) Harry Girdwood	39
3	(Scotland) Guy McGarry	29
4	(Scotland) Broque Watson	28
5	(Scotland) Dean Brett	26

- At 21/11/2026

== Honours ==
- Lowland Football League Cup
  - Winners: 2023-24
- East of Scotland Football League Premier Division
  - Winners: 2021–22
- Scottish Junior Cup
  - Winners: 1934-35
  - Runners-up (2): 1932-33, 2024–25

=== Other honours ===
- Fife & Lothians Cup
  - Winners: 2016–17
- East of Scotland Junior Cup
  - Winners (10): 1913–14, 1919–20, 1930–31, 1931–32, 1933–34, 1935–36, 1937–38, 1959–60, 1978–79, 2016–17
- King Cup winners: 2018–19
- East Region South Division: winners 2015–16
- Midlothian League winners: 1928–29, 1930–31, 1936–37
- Renton Cup winners: 1924–25
