= Willie Irvine (footballer, born 1963) =

Scottish footballer and manager

Personal information
- Date of birth: 28 December 1963 (age 62)
- Place of birth: Stirling, Scotland
- Position: Forward

Youth career
- Dunipace Juveniles

Senior career*
| Years | Team | Apps | (Gls) |
| 1982–1986 | Stirling Albion | 107 | (52) |
| 1986–1987 | Hibernian | 12 | (2) |
| 1987–1988 | Dunfermline Athletic | 12 | (2) |
| 1988 | FK Vidar | | |
| 1989 | Vålerenga | | |
| 1989–1990 | Airdrieonians | 21 | (7) |
| 1990 | → Albion Rovers (loan) | 5 | (1) |
| 1990–1992 | Meadowbank Thistle | 71 | (17) |
| 1992–1996 | Berwick Rangers | 144 | (48) |
| 1996–2001 | Alloa Athletic | 177 | (65) |
| 2001–2002 | Stenhousemuir | 22 | (7) |
| Total | | 571+ | (201+) |

Managerial career
- Sauchie
- Bo'ness United
- Lillesand
- 2010–2011: Pollok
- * Club domestic league appearances and goals

Willie Irvine (born 28 December 1963 in Stirling) is a Scottish football manager who was formerly a player. Irvine played for Stirling Albion, Hibernian, Dunfermline, FK Vidar, Vålerenga, Airdrie, Albion Rovers, Meadowbank Thistle, Berwick Rangers, Alloa and Stenhousemuir. Irvine played in 571 Scottish Football League matches, scoring 201 goals.

After retiring as a player, Irvine became manager of Junior club Sauchie. He then managed Bo'ness United and Norwegian club Lillesand before becoming manager of Pollok in March 2010. Irvine resigned from his position with Pollok on 10 October 2011. As of 2023 he was manager of Bo'ness Athletic in the East of Scotland Football League.

== Honours ==
=== Player ===
Alloa Athletic

- Scottish Challenge Cup 1999–2000

== See also ==
- List of footballers in Scotland by number of league appearances (500+)
- List of footballers in Scotland by number of league goals (200+)
