= Jock Hepburn =

Scottish footballer

Personal information
- Full name: James Hepburn
- Date of birth: c. 1860
- Place of birth: Alloa, Scotland
- Position: Left back

Senior career*
Years	Team	Apps	(Gls)
- Alloa Athletic

International career
1891	Scotland	1	(0)
- * Club domestic league appearances and goals

James "Jock" Hepburn (born c. 1860) was a Scottish footballer who played as a left back.

== Career ==
Born in Alloa, Hepburn played club football for Alloa Athletic, and made one appearance for Scotland in 1891. He also served as treasurer and secretary of Alloa Athletic, and as of 2013 remains their only ever Scottish international player. He later served as secretary of the Fifeshire Football Association.
