= Terry Christie =

Scottish footballer and manager

Personal information
- Date of birth: 16 December 1942 (age 83)
- Positions: Winger; midfielder

Youth career
- 1960-1065: Dundee

Senior career*
Years	Team	Apps	(Gls)
1965–1966	Raith Rovers	12	(2)
1966-1968	Hawick Royal Albert		
1968–1974	Stirling Albion	142	(5)
1974-1978	Newtongrange Star		
Total		154	(7)

Managerial career
- 1974–1978: Newtongrange Star
- 1980–1992: Meadowbank Thistle
- 1992–1999: Stenhousemuir
- 1999–2003: Alloa Athletic
- * Club domestic league appearances and goals

Terry Christie (born 16 December 1942) is a Scottish former football player and manager. He last managed Alloa Athletic.

== Career ==
Christie played as a full back and winger for Dundee, Raith Rovers, Hawick Royal Albert, Stirling Albion and Newtongrange Star.

He later became a manager and was in charge of Newtongrange Star, Meadowbank Thistle, Stenhousemuir and Alloa Athletic. Christie won the 1995 Scottish Challenge Cup Final while manager of Stenhousemuir.

Playing and managing in football part-time through his whole career, Christie worked as a chemistry teacher and was later headteacher of Ainslie Park High School between 1982 and 1987, and later Musselburgh Grammar School from 1987 until his retirement in 2003. He also retired from football in 2003 and published his autobiography, The Head Teacher of Football in 2015.

== Honours ==
=== Manager ===
Meadowbank Thistle

- East of Scotland "City" Cup 1984, 1986, 1989, 1990
- Scottish Second Division promotion 1982-83
- Scottish Second Division champions 1986-87
- Scottish First Division runner-up 1987-88

Stenhousemuir

- Scottish Challenge Cup 1995–96

Alloa Athletic

- Scottish Challenge Cup 1999–2000
