= Dean Brett =

Scottish footballer

Personal information
- Date of birth: 8 December 1992 (age 33)
- Place of birth: Edinburgh, Scotland
- Height: 1.73 m (5 ft 8 in)
- Positions: Right back; midfielder

Team information
- Current team: Tranent
- Number: 15

Senior career*
Years	Team	Apps	(Gls)
2009–2017	Cowdenbeath	149	(9)
2017	Bonnyrigg Rose Athletic		
2017	Montrose	0	(0)
2017–2023	Bonnyrigg Rose Athletic		
2023–	Tranent	37	(5)
- * Club domestic league appearances and goals as of 14 December 2024

Dean Brett (born 8 December 1992) is a Scottish footballer who plays as a right back or midfielder for Lowland League East club Tranent.

== Career ==
Brett made his debut for Cowdenbeath in the 2009–10 season.

In February 2017 he was suspended by the club after he admitted breaching professional conduct rules on gambling, before being sacked four days later. He had earlier received a four-match ban from the Scottish Football Association for homophobic tweets.

On 8 March 2017 Brett signed for Bonnyrigg Rose Athletic until the end of the season. After leaving the club at the end of his contract, Brett returned to senior football, signing for Scottish League Two club Montrose on 11 June 2017. Brett, however, left the club less than three weeks after joining, citing lengthy travel times to and from the club as his main motivation behind quitting.

Shortly after leaving Montrose, Brett re-signed for SJFA East Superleague side Bonnyrigg Rose Athletic.

== Personal life ==
In January 2015 his girlfriend died from cancer; their newborn daughter had died in 2014.
