= Forbes Johnston =

Scottish footballer

Personal information
- Full name: Forbes Johnston
- Date of birth: 3 August 1971
- Place of birth: Aberdeen, Scotland
- Date of death: 12 July 2007 (aged 35)
- Place of death: Adelaide, Australia
- Positions: Defender; midfielder

Youth career
- –1990: Musselburgh Athletic

Senior career*
Years	Team	Apps	(Gls)
1990–1996	Falkirk	58	(2)
1996–2000	Airdrieonians	99	(3)

International career
1993	Scotland U21	1	(0)
- * Club domestic league appearances and goals

Forbes Johnston (3 August 1971 – 12 July 2007) was a Scottish professional footballer playing primarily in defence, but also spending some time in the midfield.

== Life ==
He started his career playing for junior side Musselburgh Athletic, and joined the professional ranks at Falkirk where he played from 1990 to 1996. He later joined Airdrieonians, where he played from 1996 to 2000. Forbes also represented his country in the Scotland under-21 team.

While playing football, Johnston studied for a law degree from the University of Edinburgh. When he was 28 he joined accountancy firm PricewaterhouseCoopers in Edinburgh after a knee injury ended his football career. He later moved to Sydney and then Adelaide, Australia. Johnston was found dead in his car on 12 July 2007, aged 35. According to the Adelaide police, he had died by suicide.
