= Alloa Athletic F.C. =

Association football club in Scotland

Alloa Athletic
- Full name: Alloa Athletic Football Club
- Nicknames: The Wasps; The A-Team
- Founded: 1878; 148 years ago
- Ground: Recreation Park, Alloa
- Capacity: 3,100
- Coordinates: 56°07′0″N 3°46′43″W
- Chairman: Martin Ross
- Manager: Conor Sammon
- League: Scottish League One
- 2025–26: Scottish League One, 4th of 10
- Website: alloaathletic.co.uk
Home colours	Away colours	Third colours

Alloa Athletic Football Club is a Scottish association football semi-professional club based in the town of Alloa, Clackmannanshire. They compete in Scottish League One as a member of the Scottish Professional Football League. The club's nickname is 'The Wasps', referring to its home colours of black and gold hoops. Alloa Athletic has been based at Recreation Park in Alloa since 1895.

According to the official club history, they were formed as Clackmannan County in 1878, then from 1879 were named Alloa Association Football Club, before settling on their current name in 1883. The club was elected to the second tier of the Scottish Football League in 1921–22, earning promotion to the top flight in its first season after winning the Second Division. Below the top two tiers, Alloa Athletic has finished runners-up in the third tier a record nine times without ever winning, the most recent coming in 2016–17, when they failed to gain promotion to the Championship via the play-offs.

Alloa Athletic first entered in the Scottish Cup in 1883, its best result reaching the quarter-finals on three occasions, the last in 1988. The club's best result in a men's national cup competition was reaching the final of the Scottish Challenge Cup thrice; winning in 1999 and finishing runners-up in 2001 and 2015.

== History ==
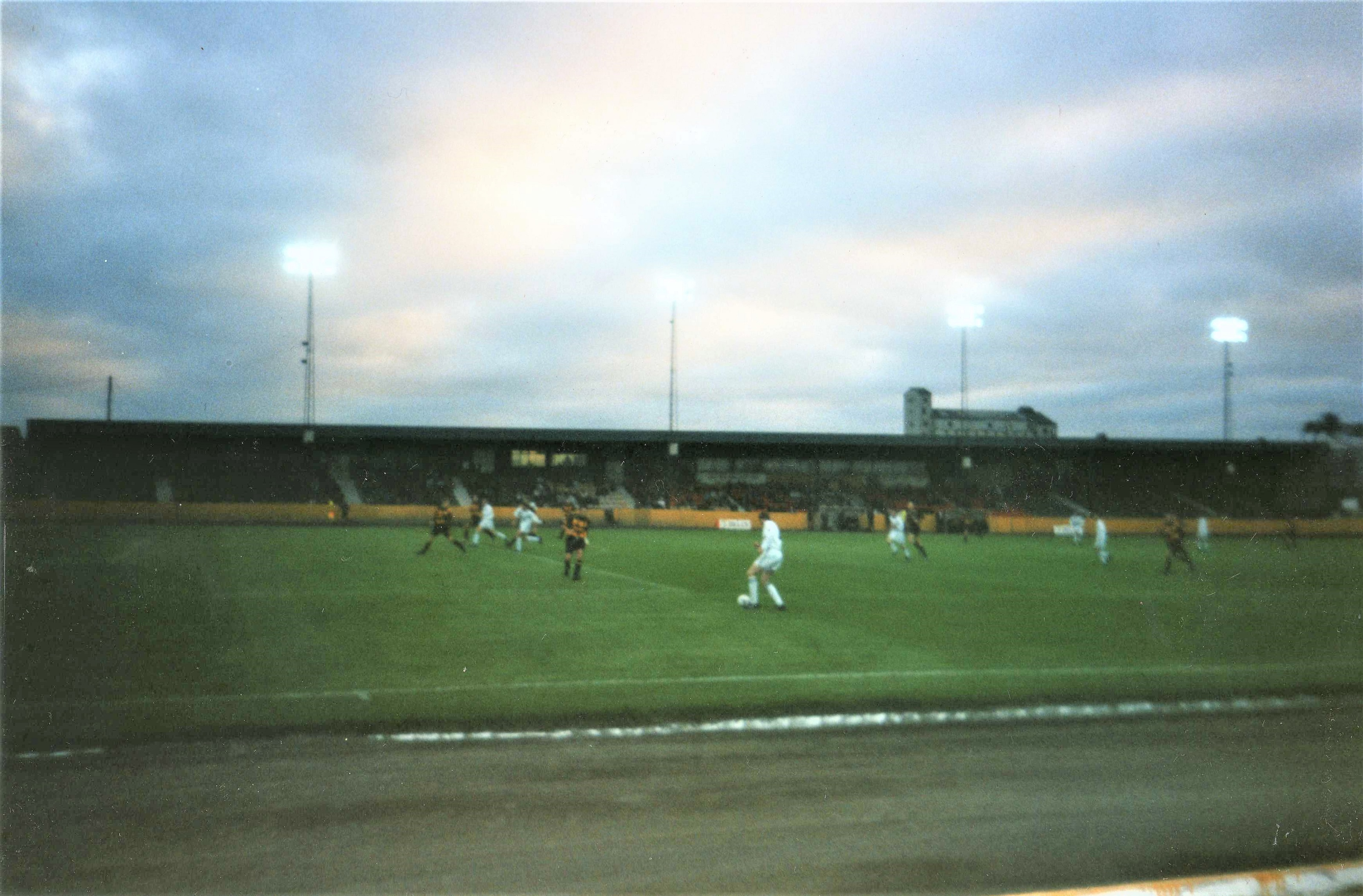
Alloa playing at Berwick in their 1997–98 title-winning season

There is some dispute over the foundation date of Alloa Athletic. The official club version has the club being founded in 1878.

However, recent research has produced information that states that The Alloa Football Club was formed on 6 August 1880 at a meeting held in McGechaen's Hall and instigated by James Rigg, who became the first captain. The club soon changed its name to Alloa Association which led to A.A.F.C. being misinterpreted by the Dunfermline secretary in October 1880, and Alloa Athletic being reported in the Dunfermline press. The club liked this name better, and so adopted it in 1881. It has often been claimed that the club was originally Clackmannan County. Although several of its players joined Alloa, this was a separate club, formed in September 1879, and who Alloa played several times during the 1880–81 season.

Admitted to the Scottish Football Association in 1883, the club had to wait until 1921 to be elected to the Scottish Football League.

In 1906–07, the club were Scottish Football Union champions and won the Central Football League six years later, with two runners-up finishes in-between.

Alloa won the Scottish Football League Division Two title in their first season but were immediately relegated from the top flight the following season. Promotion was achieved again in 1938–39 but the onset of the Second World War saw the new season curtailed after just five games. When the leagues were re-organised after the war, Alloa were placed back in Division Two.

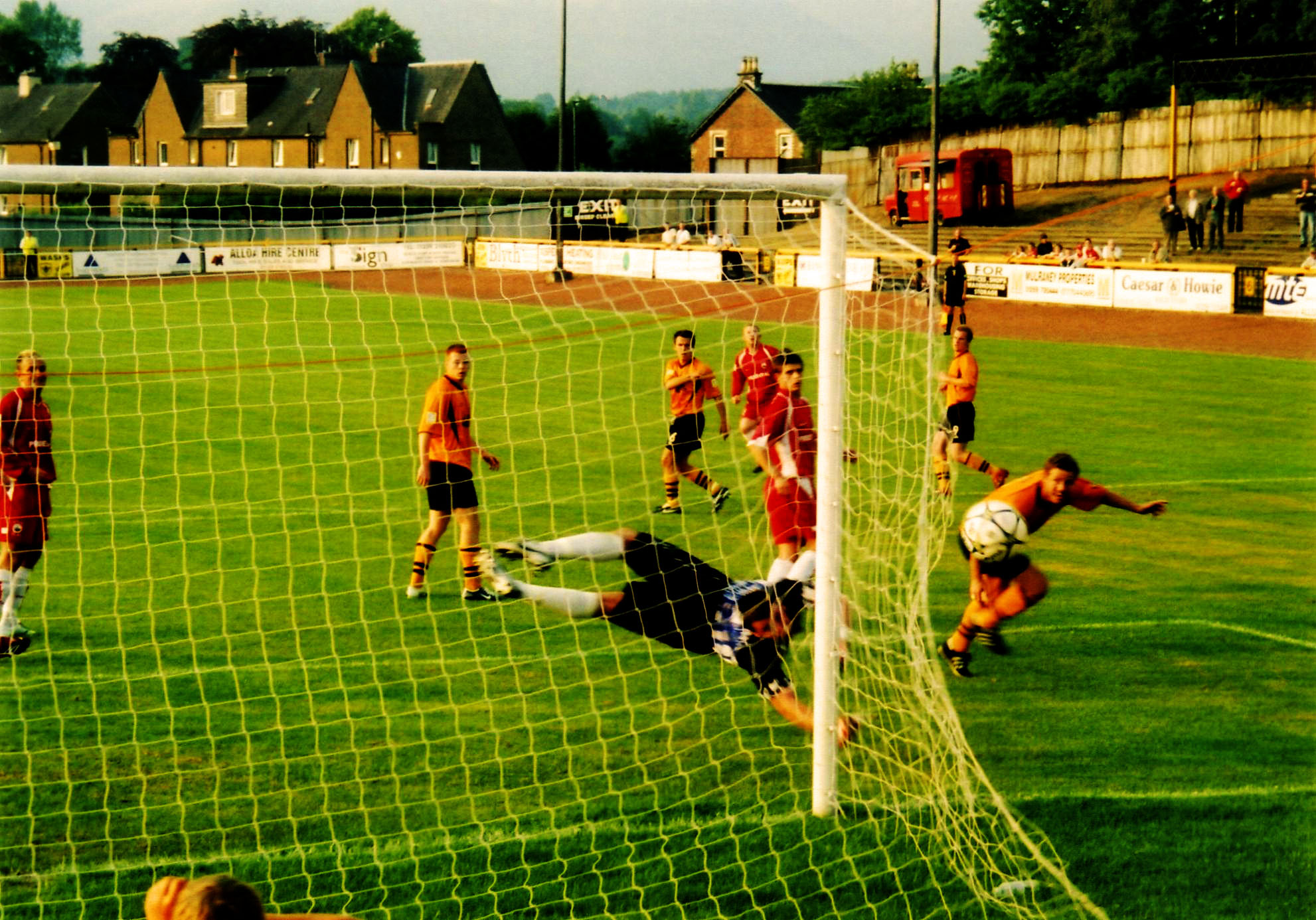
Stirling Albion shooting against the Alloa goal and missing in August 2006

The 1950s and 60s were not overly successful for the Wasps although the club did provide the game with John White who went on to play for Scotland and Tottenham Hotspur (where he was part of their famous Double winning side of the 1960–61 season). Promotion was finally achieved again from the new Second Division in 1976–77 under the managership of Hugh Wilson. Relegation soon followed but the Wasps went back up 1981–82 under Alex Totten and managed a 6th-place finish in the First Division the following season. The team was relegated again a year later and a similar pattern followed after further promotions in 1984–85 and 1988–89.

Following further league reconstruction, Alloa found themselves as founder members of the new Third Division in 1995. Under Tom Hendrie, Alloa won this league in 1997–98, the club's first championship win since 1921–22. The following season saw the team consolidate in the Second Division and also enjoy a 7–0 derby win over local rivals Stirling Albion. Following the departure of Tom Hendrie to St Mirren, Terry Christie took over at Alloa and led the club to the Scottish Challenge Cup in 1999 followed by promotion to the First Division a few months later. The team was relegated at the first attempt but bounced back up in 2001–02. Relegation followed once more, this time on goal difference.

From 2003 to 2011 Alloa played in the Second Division. In the 2009–2010 season, Alloa contended for promotion to the Scottish First Division, but they lost out to Stirling by goal difference. In the 2010–2011 season, Alloa were relegated to the Third Division after finishing 9th in the Second Division league table, and failing to negotiate the end-of-season play-offs, losing 2–1 on aggregate to Annan.

Days after, however, Alloa appointed former Aberdeen and Scotland midfielder Paul Hartley as player-manager.

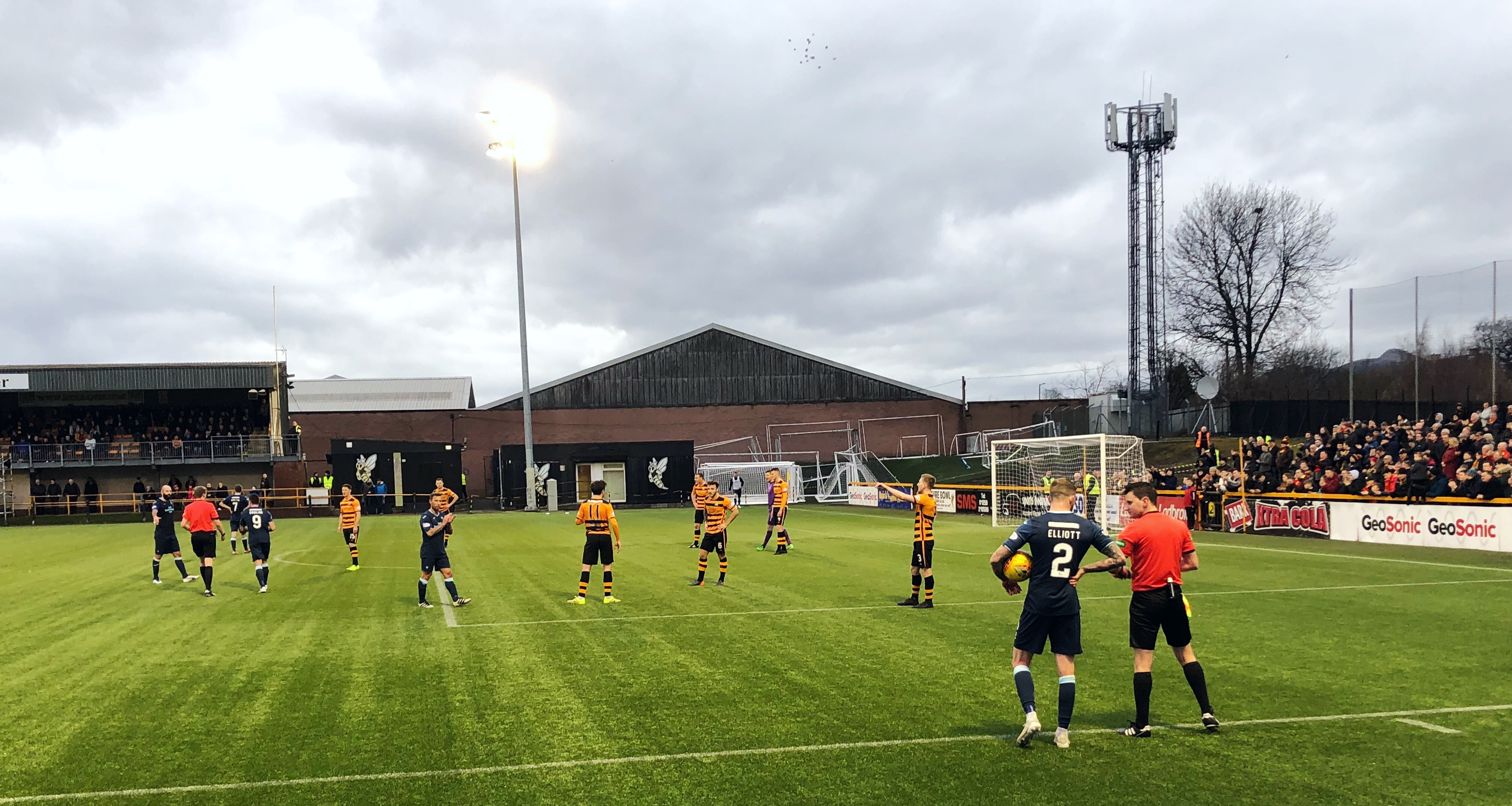
Alloa play visitors Partick Thistle in the Scottish Championship in February 2019.

On 7 April 2012, Alloa were confirmed as Scottish Third Division champions after beating Elgin City 8–1 in a home game at Recreation Park. Clyde defeated nearest rivals Stranraer 2–1 making it arithmetically impossible for the South of Scotland side to surpass the Clackmannanshire side's points total with 4 games remaining. Alloa secured back-to-back promotions the following season by finishing 2nd in the Scottish Second Division, and defeating Dunfermline in the play-off final, consigning The Pars to the third tier of Scottish football. As 2012–13 was the final season before SPFL reconstruction, Alloa started season 2013–14 in the newly formed Scottish Championship, the current name for the second tier of Scottish football. On 18 January 2014, Hartley resigned as manager following a 5–1 defeat to Dumbarton, with the club sitting eighth in the Championship.

On 7 March 2015, after slipping to a 1–0 defeat to Dumbarton that left Alloa in the relegation play-off spot, manager Barry Smith immediately resigned. On 7 April 2015, Danny Lennon was appointed the new manager on a one-year deal. Lennon lasted just eight months with Alloa, resigning on 7 December 2015 after picking up just five points from 16 games. Lennon was replaced by Jack Ross, who despite improved performances was unable to prevent them from being relegated to Scottish League One at the end of the season. Ross' Alloa started the 2016–17 season with 5 wins in the first 8 matches. However, Ross left the club at the start of October 2016, signing as manager for Scottish Championship side St Mirren. Alloa Athletic player Jim Goodwin was appointed player/manager on 11 October 2016.

== Colours and crest ==
Alloa's home colours have been black and either orange or gold hoops for the majority of its existence, hence the club's nickname "The Wasps". The club's first strip featured black and orange hoops in 1882 and rarely changed up until 1947 when gold was more commonly used with the black. Occasionally the club has adopted an all-gold or all-orange strip to replace the hoops and only once have these colours not been used; in 1897–98 the home strip was blue and white vertical stripes for a solitary season which was reverted to the traditional style the following year.

Black and orange hoops from 1882

Crest used between 1994 and 2010

The first company to supply kits for Alloa Athletic was Litesome in 1977–78. The supplier for the 2025–26 season is Pendle, who have supplied the club's kits since 1998–99. Past suppliers include Umbro, Matchwinner and Patrick. The club carried a sponsor on its shirts for the first time in the 1984–85 season; sponsored for two seasons by Maclays until 1987. Sterling sponsored the shirts for a further two seasons followed by short spells displaying Sinclair Haulage and then Campbell Homes until 1995. From the 1995–96 season to 2003–04 the sponsor was Alloa Advertiser which was replaced in 2004 by Machine Tool Engineers (MTE) who sponsored the shirt until 2012–13.

In the same year the home shirts were sponsored in 1985, the club displayed a crest for the first time. The crest reflected the club's nickname "The Wasps", featuring a black wasp on a basic gold shield with the club's initials below. The design of the crest was edited slightly in 1994 with an almost identical wasp on a similar gold shield and the club's full name was displayed below on a gold scroll banner. The crest colour varied along with the shade of colour on the strip and featured until 2010 when it was again redesigned. The new design features a large cartoon wasp and is referred to by fans of the club as 'the hornet'.

== Grounds ==
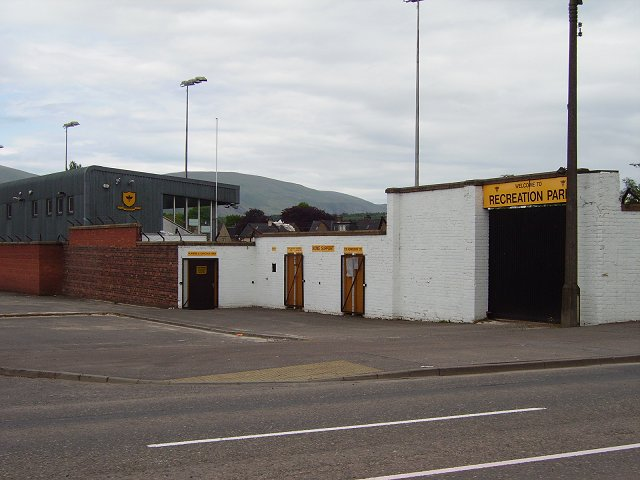
Recreation Park has been Alloa's home since 1895.

Alloa Athletic has played its home games at several grounds over its history. When the club was founded in 1880 it was based at West End Park, a public park in the west of Alloa. The club moved to Gaberston Park in 1883 and to Bellevue Park in 1890. After five years at Bellevue Park, Alloa moved to Recreation Park in 1895, where the club has played its home games since.

Recreation Park is located in the east of Alloa and has a capacity of 3,100. Alloa Athletic played and won its first Scottish Football League match at the ground in August 1921; a 1–0 win against Stenhousemuir. In February 1955, the club's record attendance was set at Recreation Park for a Scottish Cup fifth round match against Celtic when 15,467 spectators attended. The pitch at the stadium was replaced with artificial turf in 2007 and one weekend during the winter of 2010, a match at the ground between Alloa and Peterhead was the only fixture in Scotland to be played after all twenty other SPL and SFL matches were postponed due to freezing weather conditions.

Recreation Park was renamed Indodrill Stadium after a sponsorship deal with Indodrill EMEA Ltd was agreed to on Friday 12 September 2014. However, supporters of the club continue to call it Recreation Park or The Recs.

== Supporters ==
Most record books list Alloa's record attendance as 13,000 for a match against Dunfermline Athletic on 22 February 1939 in a Scottish Cup third round replay. However the recent book The Roar of the Crowd by David Ross shows the record attendance to actually be 15,467 for a Scottish Cup 5th round match against Celtic on 5 February 1955. Celtic won the game 4–2. In recent times, the record figure is a more modest 5,050 for a Second Division match against Cowdenbeath in May 1992. With the current capacity just over 3,000, the figure looks unlikely to be beaten.

Nearby club Stirling Albion are generally regarded as Alloa's local rivals.

== Current squad ==
As of 16 November 2026

Note: Flags indicate national team as defined under FIFA eligibility rules; some limited exceptions apply. Players may hold more than one non-FIFA nationality.

No.	Pos.	Nation	Player
1	GK	SCO	Ross Stewart
2	DF	SCO	Scott Taggart (captain)
3	DF	SCO	Calum Waters
4	MF	ENG	Steven Hetherington
5	DF	SCO	Joseph McGrath (on loan from Hibernian)
6	MF	SCO	Grant Marchant
7	MF	SCO	Kyle Glasgow (co-operation loan with Rangers)
9	FW	SCO	Luke Donnelly
10	FW	SCO	Luke Rankin
11	FW	SCO	Calum Gallagher
12	MF	SCO	Stefan Scougall
14	MF	SCO	Flynn McCafferty
15	MF	SCO	Josh Walker

No.	Pos.	Nation	Player
16	DF	SCO	Joe Ellison
17	FW	SCO	Max Cameron (co-operation loan with Rangers)
18	FW	SCO	Brandon Forbes
20	DF	SCO	Cameron O'Donnell
21	GK	SCO	Neil Parry
23	DF	SCO	David Devine
24	DF	SCO	Owen Foster
26	FW	SCO	Adam O'Connor
27	MF	SCO	Aiden Crilly (co-operation loan with Rangers)
28	FW	SCO	Matthew Aitken (on loan from Stenhousemuir)
29	FW	SCO	Luca Ross (on loan from Motherwell)
31	GK	NZL	Lawton Green

=== On loan ===
Note: Flags indicate national team as defined under FIFA eligibility rules; some limited exceptions apply. Players may hold more than one non-FIFA nationality.

No.	Pos.	Nation	Player
—	DF	SCO	Leo Easdon (on loan at Benburb)
—	MF	SCO	Steven Buchanan (on loan at Annan Athletic)

No.	Pos.	Nation	Player
—	MF	SCO	Kurtis Roberts (on loan at Stirling Albion)
—	FW	SCO	Lewis Bruin (on loan at Caledonian Braves)

== Club officials ==
=== Board ===
- Directors:
  - Martin Ross (Chairman)
  - Steven Lynch
  - Dr Robert McElroy
  - John O'Malley
- General manager:
  - Kieran Mooney
- Secretary:
  - Carol Edgar
- Honorary director:
  - Ewen Cameron
- Honorary president:
  - Mike Mulraney

=== Coaching staff ===
- Manager: Conor Sammon
- Assistant manager: Graeme Holmes
- First team coach: Niall Marshall
- Goalkeeping coach: Neil Parry
- Physio: Scott Anderson & Alan White
- Head of youth: Anthony Massie
- Under-19 head coach: Jason Scotland
- Kit manager: Reece Robertson
- Groundsman: Alan Petrie

== Managers ==
- (Scotland) Jimmy Crapnell (1946)
- (Scotland) Tommy Lipton (1946–1947)
- (Scotland) Jimmy Simpson (1947–1948)
- (Scotland) Bobby Hogg (1948–1949)
- (Scotland) Tommy Lipton (1949–1951)
- (Scotland) Davie McCulloch (1951–1952)
- (Scotland) Webber Lees (1952–1955)
- (Scotland) Jerry Kerr (1955–1959)
- (Scotland) Archie McPherson (1959–1969)
- (Scotland) Duncan McCallum (1969–1971)
- (Scotland) Ian Crawford (1971–1972)
- (Scotland) Dan McLindon (1972–1974)
- (Scotland) Hugh Wilson (1974–1980)
- (Scotland) Alex Totten (1980–1982)
- (Scotland) Willie Garner (1982–1984)
- (Scotland) Jimmy Thomson (1984–1986)
- (Scotland) Dom Sullivan (1986–1987)
- (Scotland) Gregor Abel (1987–1990)
- (Scotland) Billy Little (1990)
- (Scotland) Hugh McCann (1990–93)
- (Scotland) Billy Lamont (1993–1995)
- (Scotland) Pat McAuley (1995–1996)
- (Scotland) Tom Hendrie (1996–1998)
- (Scotland) Terry Christie (1999–2003)
- (Scotland) Tom Hendrie (2003–2006)
- (Scotland) Allan Maitland (2006–2011)
- (Scotland) Paul Hartley (2011–2014)
- (Scotland) Barry Smith (2014–2015)
- (Northern Ireland) Danny Lennon (2015)
- (Scotland) Jack Ross (2015–2016)
- (Republic of Ireland) Jim Goodwin (2016–2019)
- (Scotland) Peter Grant (2019–2021)
- (Scotland) Barry Ferguson (2021–2022)
- (Scotland) Brian Rice (2022–2023)
- (Scotland) Andy Graham (2023–2026)
- (Republic of Ireland) Conor Sammon (2026–Present)

== Honours ==
=== League ===
- Division Two (before 1975) and First Division (after 1975):
  - Winners (1): 1921–22
  - Runners-up (1): 1938–39
- Second Division (after 1975) and League One (after 2013):
  - Runners-up (9): 1976–77, 1981–82, 1984–85, 1988–89, 1999–00, 2001–02, 2009–10, 2012–13, 2016–17
- Third Division (after 1994):
  - Winners (2): 1997–98, 2011–12
- Central Football League:
  - Winners (1): 1912–13
  - Runners-up (2): 1909–10, 1911–12
- Scottish Football Union:
  - Champions (1): 1906–07

=== Cup ===
- Scottish Challenge Cup:
  - Winners (1): 1999
  - Runners-up (2): 2001, 2015
- Stirlingshire Cup:
  - Winners (14): 1904–05, 1907–08, 1908–09, 1912–13, 1920–21, 1924–25, 1933–34, 1946–47, 1955–56, 1957–58, 1959–60, 1965–66, 1981–82, 1996–97
  - Runners-up (20): 1905–06, 1906–07, 1909–10, 1910–11, 1911–12, 1921–22, 1923–24, 1935–36, 1936–37, 1947–48, 1949–50, 1954–55, 1956–57, 1960–61, 1968–69, 1983–84, 1993–94, 1997–98, 1999–2000, 2000–01
- Fife Cup:
  - Winners (3): 1885–86, 1895–96, 1897–98
  - Runners-up (1): 1883–84

The club's women's team won the ScottishPower Regional League Plate in 2026 with a 4–0 win over Penicuik Athletic.

== Records ==
- Biggest win: 9–0 v Selkirk, Scottish Cup 1st round, 28 November 2005
- Worst defeat: 0–10 v Dundee, Scottish League B Division, 8 March 1947 (home match); 0–10 v Third Lanark, Scottish League Cup Division 2 Section A, 8 August 1953 (home match)
- Highest home attendance: 15,467 v Celtic, Scottish Cup 5th round, 5 February 1955
- Most capped player: Jock Hepburn (1 for Scotland)
- Most league goals in a season: Willie Crilley (49 in 1921–22)
- Transfer fee paid: £26,000 for Ross Hamilton from Stenhousemuir, July 2000
- Transfer fee received: £100,000 for Greig Spence to Celtic, August 2010
