= 2006–07 Scottish Junior Cup =

Tournament details
- Country: Scotland

Final positions
- Champions: Linlithgow Rose
- Runners-up: Kelty Hearts

The 2006–07 Scottish Junior Cup was a competition in Scottish Junior football. It was won for the third time by Linlithgow Rose after they defeated Kelty Hearts 2–1 in the final.

Under a new rule change, the Junior Cup winners (along with winners of the North, East and West regional leagues) qualify for the senior Scottish Cup; Linlithgow Rose therefore competed in the 2007–08 Scottish Cup.

== First round ==
These ties were scheduled to take place on Saturday 30 September 2006.

Home team	Score	Away team
Crossgates Primrose	3 – 4	Hurlford United
Edinburgh United	0 – 1	Kilbirnie Ladeside
Tayport	1 – 0	Newtongrange Star
Bonnyrigg Rose Athletic	7 – 1	Vale of Leven
FC Stoneywood	2 – 7	Stonehouse Violet
Blackburn United	3 – 2	Muirkirk
Thorniewood United	5 – 1	Dufftown
Whitletts Victoria	2 – 3	Glentanar
Brechin Victoria	1 – 6	Montrose Roselea
Stoneyburn	0 – 3	Rutherglan Glencairn
Bankfoot Athletic	2 – 6	Hill of Beath Hawthorn
Ashfield	3 – 2	Turriff United
East Kilbride Thistle	3 – 1	Broxburn Athletic
Aberdeen East End	1 – 0	Scone Thistle
Kinloss	walkover	Burghead Thistle
Cambuslang Rangers	0 – 0	Neilston Juniors
Dundonald Bluebell	1 – 0	Fochabers
Vale of Clyde	1 – 0	Lochgelly Albert
Coupar Angus	2 – 1	Dalry Thistle
Arniston Rangers	2 – 0	Kirriemuir Thistle
Culter	0 – 0	Saltcoats Victoria
Clydebank	0 – 1	Glenafton Athletic
Glasgow Perthshire	0 – 0	Dalkeith Thistle
Dyce Juniors	0 – 5	Auchinleck Talbot
Benburb	5 – 0	Royal Albert
Steelend Victoria	2 – 3	Cumnock Juniors
St Anthony's	4 – 1	Forfar Albion
Pumpherston	8 – 1	Whitehills
Pollok	12 – 2	New Elgin
Maybole Juniors	0 – 2	Kelty Hearts
Harthill Royal	6 – 1	Wishaw
Buckie Rovers	0 – 8	Lochee United
Arbroath SC	1 – 2	Longside
Hall Russell United	1 – 3	Aberdeen Lads Club

=== Replays ===
Home team	Score	Away team
Neilston Juniors	1 – 2	Cambuslang Rangers
Saltcoats Victoria	0 – 2	Culter
Dalkeith Thistle	2 – 3	Glasgow Perthshire

== Second round ==
These ties were scheduled to take place on Saturday 4 November 2006.

Home team	Score	Away team
Sauchie	1 – 2	Hill of Beath Hawthorn
Jeanfield Swifts	4 – 1	Nairn St. Ninian
Kilsyth Rangers	5 – 2	Dunbar United
Linlithgow Rose	7 – 0	Aberdeen Lads Club
Maud	0 – 1	Kirkintilloch Rob Roy
Irvine Victoria	2 – 1	Larkhall Thistle
Blackburn United	4 – 0	Annbank United
Carluke Rovers	4 – 2	Greenock Juniors
Islavale	1 – 2	Hermes
Bishopmill United	0 – 1	Aberdeen East End
Broughty Athletic	4 – 1	Troon
Lewis United	0 – 4	Culter
Bonnyrigg Rose Athletic	walkover	Cruden Bay
Vale of Clyde	4 – 1	Lesmahagow Juniors
Kilbirnie Ladeside	4 – 3	Glasgow Perthshire
Glenafton Athletic	0 – 0	Lanark United
Hurlford United	1 – 1	Newmains United
Kinnoull	3 – 1	Forth Wanderers
Oakley United	8 – 0	Girvan
Longside	3 – 3	Kello Rovers
Lochee United	1 – 0	Pumpherston
Arthurlie	5 – 0	Forfar West End
Coupar Angus	1 – 3	Newburgh
Largs Thistle	1 – 2	Neilston Juniors
Lugar Boswell Thistle	3 – 0	Parkvale
Downfield	2 – 2	Musselburgh Athletic
Buchanhaven Hearts	2 – 2	East Craigie
Montrose Roselea	4 – 4	Banchory St. Ternan
Hillend Juniors	3 – 1	Johnstone Burgh
Lochore Welfare	1 – 4	Pollok
RAF Lossiemouth	0 – 5	Ballingry Rovers
Bellshill Athletic	2 – 2	Glenrothes
Penicuik Athletic	5 – 2	Fraserburgh United
Stonehaven	3 – 2	St Andrews United
Arniston Rangers	1 – 2	Haddington Athletic
Thornton Hibernian	1 – 7	Dundonald Bluebell
Irvine Meadow XI	2 – 1	St Anthony's
Lochee Harp	1 – 0	Rosyth
Shettleston	0 – 3	Auchinleck Talbot
Carnoustie Panmure	1 – 1	Bathgate Thistle
Ardeer Thistle	0 – 1	Ellon United
Blantyre Victoria	2 – 0	Maryhill
Kelty Hearts	14 – 0	Burghead Thistle
Glentanar	3 – 0	Darvel
Cumbernauld United	0 – 0	Faulhouse United
Banks O' Dee	1 – 1	Craigmark Burntonians
St Roch's	6 – 3	Lossiemouth United
Camelon	1 – 0	Dundee Violet
Renfrew	4 – 0	Livingston United
East Kilbride Thistle	2 – 0	Stonehouse Violet
Tayport	4 – 2	Thorniewood United
Forres Thistle	0 – 1	Luncarty
Ashfield	3 – 0	Armadale Thistle
Petershill	0 – 0	Blairgowrie
Port Glasgow	1 – 0	Cumnock Juniors
West Calder United	0 – 5	Harthill Royal
Dundee North End	0 – 1	Rutherglen Glencairn
Strathspey Thistle	0 – 2	Arbroath Victoria
Benburb	0 – 2	Bo'ness United
Yoker Athletic	1 – 0	Ardrossan Winton Rovers
Kircaldy YMCA	2 – 1	Formartine United
Tranent	2 – 1	Sunnybank
Whitburn	1 – 0	Shotts Bon Accord

=== Replays ===
Home team	Score	Away team
Lanark United	2 – 1	Glenafton Athletic
Newmains United	4 – 3	Hurlford United
Kello Rovers	1 – 4	Longside
Musselburgh Athletic	2 – 1	Downfield
East Craigie	2 – 1	Buchanhaven Hearts
Banchory St. Ternan	0 – 1	Montrose Roselea
Bathgate Thistle	2 – 3	Carnoustie Panmure
Glenrothes	0 – 3	Bellshill Athletic
Faulhouse United	0 – 0 (4 – 2 pen.)	Cumbernauld United
Craigmark Burntonians	0 – 4	Banks O' Dee
Blairgowrie	1 – 2	Petershill

== Third round ==
These ties were scheduled to take place on Saturday, 2 December 2006.

Home team	Score	Away team
Auchinleck Talbot	3 – 0	Newmains United
Banks O' Dee	2 – 1	Hillend Juniors
Bonnyrigg Rose Athletic	5 – 3	Penicuik Athletic
Fauldhouse United	1 – 1	Broughty Athletic
Camelon	2 – 0	Kirkcaldy YMCA
Carluke Rovers	0 – 1	Arbroath Victoria
Carnoustie Panmure	1 – 2	Dundonald Bluebell
Culter	0 – 4	Linlithgow Rose
Aberdeen East End	1 – 0	Glentanar
Ellon United	3 – 1	Stonehaven
Lanark United	1 – 0	Blantyre Victoria
Haddington Athletic	0 – 2	Ballingry Rovers
Bellshill Athletic	2 – 2	Hill of Beath Hawthorn
Irvine Victoria	3 – 1	East Cragie
Whitburn	1 – 1	Kelty Hearts
Kilbirnie Ladeside	1 – 2	Irvine Meadow XI
Blackburn United	3 – 3	Kilsyth Rangers
Lugar Boswell Thistle	1 – 1	Kilwinning Rangers
Kinnoull	1 – 0	Ashfield
Lochee Harp	4 – 1	Vale of Clyde
Lochee United	4 – 0	Harthill United
Longside	1 – 3	Neilston Juniors
Luncarty	1 – 6	East Kilbride Thistle
Musselburgh Athletic	2 – 1	St Roch's
Oakley United	1 – 2	Rutherglen Glencairn
Petershill	6 – 0	Newburgh
Port Glasgow	0 – 4	Pollok
Hermes	1 – 1	Renfrew
Tayport	2 – 1	Kirkintilloch Rob Roy
Tranent	2 – 1	Bo'ness United
Yoker Athletic	2 – 0	Jeanfield Swifts

=== Replays ===
Home team	Score	Away team
Broughty Athletic	2 – 1	Fauldhouse United
Hill of Beath Hawthorn	2 – 4	Bellshill Athletic
Kelty Hearts	3 – 2	Whitburn
Kilsyth Rangers	1 – 0	Blackburn United
Kilwinning Rangers	2 – 1	Lugar Boswell Thistle
Renfrew	4 – 0	Hermes

== Fourth round ==
These ties were scheduled to take place on Saturday 13 January 2007.

Home team	Score	Away team
Arbroath Victoria	0 – 5	Kilsyth Rangers
Broughty Athletic	2 – 6	Kelty Hearts
Tranent	1 – 0	Banks O' Dee
Lanark United	1 – 1	Bellshill Athletic
replay	1 – 1 (5 – 3p)	
Aberdeen East End	0 – 4	Linlithgow Rose
Auchinleck Talbot	3 – 3	Lochee United
replay	0 – 0 (3 – 4p)	
Lochee Harp	3 – 3	Irvine Meadow XI
replay	0 – 5	
East Kilbride Thistle	3 – 0	Irvine Victoria
Ballingry Rovers	1 – 1	Petershill
replay	0 – 1	
Kilwinning Rangers	1 – 1	Rutherglen Glencairn
replay	1 – 0	
Yoker Athletic	1 – 1	Ellon United
replay	1 – 0	
Pollok	4 – 1	Kinnoull
Renfrew	0 – 5	Arthurlie
Neilston Juniors	1 – 1	Bonnyrigg Rose Athletic
replay	3 – 0	
Musselburgh Athletic	3 – 0	Dundonald Bluebell

=== Replays ===
Home team	Score	Away team

== Fifth round ==
These ties were scheduled to take place on Saturday 10 February 2007.

Home team	Score	Away team
Lochee United	1 – 3	Linlithgow Rose
Lanark United	2 – 0	East Kilbride Thistle
Arthurlie	1 – 1	Petershill
replay	5 – 1	
Yoker Athletic	2 – 2	Tranent
replay	2 – 0	
Neilston Juniors	1 – 1	Musselburgh Athletic
replay	2 – 0	
Kilwinning Rangers	1 – 1	Camelon
replay	2 – 0	
Kelty Hearts	2 – 1	Kilsyth Rangers
Irvine Meadow XI	1 – 1	Pollok
replay	1 – 2	

== Quarter finals ==
These ties were played on Saturday 10 March 2007.

Home team	Score	Away team
Neilston Juniors	1 – 2	Kilwinning Rangers
Arthurlie	4 – 2	Yoker Athletic
Lanark United	0 – 1	Kelty Hearts
Linlithgow Rose	1 – 0	Pollok

== Semi-finals ==
These ties were played on 13 April and 20 April, respectively.

Home team	Score	Away team	Venue
Arthurlie	1 – 4	Linlithgow Rose	Love street, Paisley
Kelty Hearts	3 – 0	Kilwinning Rangers	New Douglas Park, Hamilton

== Final ==
The final took place on 3 June 2007.

Home team	Score	Away team	Venue
Kelty Hearts	1 – 2	Linlithgow Rose	East End Park, Dunfermline
