= 2007–08 Scottish Junior Cup =

Tournament details
- Country: Scotland

Final positions
- Champions: Bathgate Thistle
- Runners-up: Cumnock Juniors

The 2007–08 Scottish Junior Cup was a competition in Scottish Junior football. It was won for the first time by Bathgate Thistle after they defeated Cumnock Juniors 2–1 in the final at Rugby Park, Kilmarnock.

Under a recent rule change, the Junior Cup winners (along with winners of the North, East and West regional leagues) qualify for the senior Scottish Cup; Bathgate Thistle therefore competed in the 2008–09 Scottish Cup.

== First round ==
These ties were scheduled to take place on Saturday 6 October 2007.

Home team	Score	Away team
Arthurlie	2–1	Girvan
Sauchie	2–1	Muirkirk
Kinnoull	2–2	West Calder United
replay	1–1 (4–5p)	
F.C. Stoneywood	0–1	Ellon United
Kilwinning Rangers	1–1	Sunnybank
replay	2–2 (2–4p)	
Penicuik Athletic	3–4	Irvine Meadow
Shotts Bon Accord	3–2	Kilbirnie Ladeside
Annbank United	2–3	Lochgelly Albert
East Craigie	3–1	Strathspey Thistle
Pumpherston	1–1	Dundee Violet
replay	2–1	
Ardrossan Winton Rovers	5–1	New Elgin
Dunipace	2–0	Johnstone Burgh
Hermes	0–5	Glenafton
Rutherglen Glencairn	1–1	Dundee North End
replay	0–1	
Stoneyburn	3–1	Luncarty
Newtongrange Star	4–0	Forres Thistle
Arbroath Sporting Club	2–3	Jeanfield Swifts
Clydebank	6–3	Scone Thistle
Forfar West End	1–0	Fauldhouse United
Greenock Juniors	2–2	Forth Wanderers
replay	2–3	
Harthill Royal	1–1	Dalkeith Thistle
replay	2–0	
Auchinleck Talbot	7–0	Burghead Thistle
Stevenston Ardeer Thistle	1–6	Whitburn Juniors
Dalry Thistle	5–6	St Andrews United
Lanark United	5–1	Glentanar
Blackburn United	0–0	Maryhill
replay	2–2 (3–4p)	
Thorniewood United	1–2	Arniston Rangers
St. Roch's	1–0	Buckie Rovers
Largs Thistle	1–2	Linlithgow Rose
Culter	0–0	Vale of Leven
replay	2–2 (3–2p)	

== Second round ==
These ties were scheduled to take place on Saturday 3 November 2007.

Home team	Score	Away team
Broughty Athletic	2–4	Neilston Juniors
Renfrew	1–2	Irvine Victoria
Forfar Albion	0–3	Lochore Welfare
Armadale Thistle	1–2	Larkhall Thistle
Whitburn Juniors	3–0	Crossgates Primrose
Lochgelly Albert	2–2	Stonehaven
replay	1–3	
Sauchie	1–1	Haddington Athletic
replay	3–2	
Dyce	1–2	St Andrew's United
Lewis United	3–0	Fraserburgh United
Bonnyrigg Rose Athletic	2–2	St. Anthony's
replay	4–1	
Ardrossan Winton Rovers	1–1	Aberdeen Lads Club
replay	5–4	
Yoker Athletic	0–3	Lochee Harp
Kello Rovers	3–5	Camelon Juniors
Brechin Victoria	0–5	Dundee North End
Carnoustie Panmure	2–1	Beith Juniors
Troon	1–3	Bathgate Thistle
Steelend Victoria	2–7	Lochee United
Newtongrange Star	14–0	Bishopmill United
Glenrothes Juniors	3–0	Arthurlie
Whitletts Victoria	3–1	Forth Wanderers
Blairgowrie	3–0	Darvel
Newburgh	1–3	Arniston Rangers
St. Roch's	1–1	Craigmark Burntonians
replay	2–0	
Saltcoats Victoria	3–1	Dunbar United
Stoneyburn	0–2	Kelty Hearts
Whitehills	1–4	Benburb
Hall Russell United	0–3	Lugar Boswell Thistle
Banchory St. Ternan	4–1	Tranent
Stonehouse Violet	1–5	Lanark United
Blantyre Victoria	1–4	Cumnock Juniors
Bellshill Athletic	1–3	Glenafton
Ashfield	4–1	Shettleston
Harthill Royal	3–0	Longside
Dundonald Bluebell	2–4	Lesmahagow
Turriff United	6–0	Parkvale
Edinburgh United	1–3	Oakley United
Livingston United	1–2	Dunipace
Islavale	0–1	Hill of Beath Hawthorn
Musselburgh Athletic	3–2	Vale of Clyde
Royal Albert	0–3	Kilsyth Rangers
Jeanfield Swifts	2–2	Sunnybank
replay	0–5	
Rosyth Recreation	5–0	Aberdeen East End
West Calder United	1–2	Tayport
Bankfoot Athletic	1–2	Carluke Rovers
Shotts Bon Accord	4–3	Banks O'Dee
Maud	3–2	Cambuslang Rangers
Bo'ness United	7–0	Dufftown
Thornton Hibs	1–1	Petershill
replay	1–0	
Linlithgow Rose	4–2	Irvine Meadow
Clydebank	3–1	Forfar West End
Arbroath Victoria	1–1	Dundee Downfield
replay	0–5	
Coupar Angus	0–6	Ballingry Rovers
Maryhill	1–6	Auchinleck Talbot
Formartine United	0–1	Kirriemuir Thistle
Lossiemouth United	1–2	Hillhead
Port Glasgow Juniors	0–4	East Kilbride Thistle
Broxburn Athletic	0–1	Wishaw Juniors
R.A.F. Lossiemouth	0–7	Maybole
Culter	6–0	Nairn St. Ninian
Hurlford United	0–1	Pumpherston
Buchanhaven Hearts	2–4	Kirkintilloch Rob Roy
Cumbernauld United	6–1	Dundee East Craigie
Deveronside	2–5	Montrose Roselea
Ellon United	0–7	Pollok

== Third round ==
These ties were scheduled to take place on 1 December 2007.

Home team	Score	Away team
Kilsyth Rangers	2–2	Montrose Roselea
replay	1–1 (4–5p)	
Lugar Boswell Thistle	1–1	Wishaw
replay	5–1	
Bo'ness United	0–1	Linlithgow Rose
Ardrossan Winton Rovers	0–5	Neilston Juniors
Irvine Victoria	3–1	Saltcoats Victoria
Newtongrange Star	2–1	East Kilbride Thistle
Hill of Beath Hawthorn	2–4	Maybole
Dundee Downfield	2–1	Turriff United
Carnoustie Panmure	2–2	Tayport
replay	2–2 (2–5p)	
Banchory St. Ternan	3–3	Blairgowrie
replay	1–5	
Carluke Rovers	0–2	Ballingry Rovers
Glenafton	1–0	Whitburn
Culter	– 2	Bonnyrigg Rose Athletic
Shotts Bon Accord	2–3	Pumpherston
Glenrothes	1–3	Camelon Juniors
Bathgate Thistle	5–0	Oakley United
Lochee Harp	3–4	Thornton Hibs
Dundee North End	1–3	Lochore Welfare
Cumbernauld United	1–1	Lanark United
replay	1–1 (7–8)	
St Andrew's United	0–3	Pollok
Benburb	1–4	Whitletts Victoria
Maud	5–0	Hillhead
Arniston Rangers	0–2	Harthill Royal
Kirriemuir Thistle	1–3	Sauchie
Ashfield	1–3	Lochee United
Kelty Hearts	2–4	Musselburgh Athletic
Dunipace	0–4	Kirkintilloch Rob Roy
Auchinleck Talbot	4–2	Sunnybank
Rosyth Recreation	1–0	Stonehaven
Clydebank	4–1	St. Roch's
Lesmahagow	3–2	Lewis United
Cumnock Juniors	4–2	Larkhall Thistle

== Fourth round ==
These ties were scheduled to take place on 19 January 2008.

Home team	Score	Away team
Tayport	1–1	Pollok
replay	1–4	
Musselburgh Athletic	2–2	Kirkintilloch Rob Roy
replay	2–2 (4–2p)	
Glenafton	5–0	Dundee Downfield
Auchinleck Talbot	1–0	Bonnyrigg Rose Athletic
Neilston Juniors	2–1	Rosyth Recreation
Harthill Royal	1–3	Shotts Bon Accord
Ballingry Rovers	1–1	Whitletts Victoria
replay	0–0 (5–4p)	
Lugar Boswell Thistle	1–2	Lanark United
Sauchie	1–1	Lochee United
replay	2–3	
Bathgate Thistle	2–0	Montrose Roselea
Camelon Juniors	5–0	Irvine Victoria
Thornton Hibs	2–1	Maud
Blairgowrie	2–3	Clydebank
Lesmahagow	1–1	Maybole
replay	0–2	
Lochore Welfare	0–4	Newtongrange Star
Linlithgow Rose	1–3	Cumnock Juniors

== Fifth round ==
These ties were scheduled to take place on 16 February 2008.

Home team	Score	Away team
Lanark United	1–0	Camelon Juniors
Neilston Juniors	0–2	Auchinleck Talbot
Glenafton	1–0	Musselburgh Athletic
Maybole	1–1	Thornton Hibs
replay	0–2	
Ballingry Rovers	1–2	Pollok
Bathgate Thistle	1–0	Shotts Bon Accord
Clydebank	3–2	Lochee United
Newtongrange Star	0–2	Cumnock Juniors

== Quarter finals ==
These ties were scheduled to take place on 15 March 2008.

Home team	Score	Away team
Lanark United	0–3	Pollok
Thornton Hibs	2–1	Glenafton
Bathgate Thistle	1–1	Clydebank
replay	1–1 (4–2p)	
Cumnock Juniors	1–1	Auchinleck Talbot

== Semi finals ==
These ties were played on 12 April and 19 April 2008, respectively, at Broadwood Stadium, Cumbernauld.

Home team	Score	Away team
Thornton Hibs	0–3 AET	Cumnock Juniors
Pollok	1–2 AET	Bathgate Thistle

== Final ==
The final took place on 1 June 2008, at Rugby Park, Kilmarnock.

Home team	Score	Away team
Cumnock Juniors	1–2	Bathgate Thistle
