= Fife derby =

Football rivalry in Fife, Scotland

- Location: Fife, Scotland
- Teams: Dunfermline Athletic; Raith Rovers; East Fife; Cowdenbeath; Kelty Hearts
- First meeting: 22 August 1888; Cowdenbeath 2–4 Dunfermline Athletic; 1888–89 Scottish Cup 2nd round
- Latest meeting: 22 August 2025; Raith Rovers 2–0 Dunfermline Athletic; 2025–26 Scottish Championship

Statistics
- Total meetings: 625 (August 2025)
- Most wins: Raith Rovers (143)
- All-time record: Raith Rovers (143); Dunfermline Athletic (123); East Fife (114); Cowdenbeath (107); Draw (138)

The Fife derby is a football rivalry that is based in Fife, Scotland. Matches are contested between any two SPFL clubs from Dunfermline Athletic, Raith Rovers (based in Kirkcaldy), East Fife (representing the Levenmouth area) and Cowdenbeath. As of 2021, a fifth Fife side, Kelty Hearts, entered the SPFL.

== Overview ==
The two best-supported clubs in the region are Dunfermline and Raith Rovers, and in general their meetings attract the most interest, however any match between the five clubs is referred to as a 'Fife derby'. A sixth local club, Lochgelly United, competed in the Scottish Football League for five seasons (1921 to 1926).

None of the clubs have won the Scottish League title or finished runners-up. Aside from Kelty Hearts, all have played in the top division at one point in their history (although never all at the same time). East Fife were Scottish League Cup winners three times in six years between 1947 and 1953, while Dunfermline won the Scottish Cup twice in the 1960s; The only occasion when two clubs from the region met in a major cup final was in October 1949, when East Fife defeated Dunfermline 3–0 at Hampden Park to win the 1949–50 League Cup; the crowd of 39,744 is a record for a Fife derby match.

Raith Rovers are the only Fife team to have won the Scottish Challenge Cup, achieving this in both 2022 and most notably 2014 with a win over Rangers. Perhaps the most important Fife derby meeting of the early 21st century came a month after the Raith cup win, when Cowdenbeath overcame Dunfermline 4–1 on aggregate in the 2013–14 Championship play-off final to preserve their status in Scotland's second tier at their neighbours' expense.

Dunfermline Athletic had their first sellout crowd in 15 years for a Fife derby played against First Division title rivals Raith Rovers in April 2011. East Fife's record attendance at their old Bayview Park ground was also against Raith, attracting a 22,515 crowd in 1950.

=== Senior non-league and Juniors ===
Prior to 2017, most of the Fife clubs outwith the SPFL played in the Junior setup's East Region, with both Kelty Hearts and Tayport having won the East Superleague on two occasions. Burntisland Shipyard were the sole senior team, playing in the East of Scotland Football League.

In 2017 Kelty left the Juniors and joined the East of Scotland League (which is part of the senior pyramid) with the aim of rising through the divisions and becoming an SPFL club. A year later several other teams from Fife followed suit, including Kelty's local rivals Hill of Beath Hawthorn, plus Crossgates Primrose, Dundonald Bluebell, Inverkeithing Hillfield Swifts, Oakley United, and St Andrews United, with Glenrothes following a year later.

Meanwhile, Kelty were successful in achieving their ambition. In 2018 they were promoted to the Lowland Football League, and were subsequently promoted to the SPFL in 2021, becoming the fifth Fife club in the league.

With the exception of Tayport who compete against teams in the Tayside area due to their proximity to Dundee via the Tay Road Bridge, the remainder of the Fife Junior clubs—Kennoway Star Hearts, Kirkcaldy & Dysart, Lochgelly Albert, Lochore Welfare, Newburgh, Rosyth, and Thornton Hibs—moved across to the East of Scotland League for the 2020–21 season.

== Results tables ==
=== Dunfermline v Raith Rovers ===
- First meeting: 7 September 1889, 1889–90 Scottish Cup
- Next meeting: 18 October 2025, 2025–26 Scottish Championship

As of: 22 August 2025.

Competition (Note: Does not include unofficial wartime competitions, or regional tournaments like the Fife Cup.)	GP	DNF	Dr	RAR	DNFG	RARG
League (Note: Includes matches in different divisions, and from the different eras: SFL, SPL, SPFL.)	116 (Note: Includes two matches in the 2021 playoffs (0–0, Raith 2–0 Dunfermline).)	45	29	42	168	168
Scottish Cup	7	3	0	4	6	12
League Cup	9	3	3 (Note: Includes 1 penalty shootout victory for Dunfermline in 2023 following a draw, counted as a win in the source but usually considered a draw)	3	13	15
Challenge Cup	2	1	0	1	1	2
Total	134	52	32	50	188	197

=== Dunfermline v East Fife ===
- First meeting: 24 September 1921, 1921–22 Scottish Division Two
- Next meeting: To be confirmed.

As of: 7 September 2024.

Competition	GP	DNF	Dr	EAF	DNFG	EAFG
League	52	17	12	23	91	105
Scottish Cup	4	1	1	2	5	9
League Cup	11	3	2 (Note: Includes 1 penalty shootout victory for Dunfermline in 2017 following a draw, counted as a win in the source but usually considered a draw)	6	16	27
Challenge Cup	1	1	0	0	2	0
Total	68	22	15	31	114	141

=== East Fife v Raith Rovers ===
- First meeting: 21 August 1926, 1926–27 Scottish Division Two
- Next meeting: To be confirmed.

As of: 9 October 2021.

Competition	GP	EAF	Dr	RAR	EAFG	RARG
League	74	29	14	31	126	133
Scottish Cup	4	3	1	0	9	4
League Cup	21	7	4	10	40	41
Challenge Cup	2	0	0	2	3	6
Total	101	39	19	43	178	184

=== Cowdenbeath v Dunfermline ===
- First meeting: 22 August 1888, 1888–89 Scottish Cup
- Next meeting: To be confirmed.

As of: end of 2017–18 season.

Competition	GP	CWB	Dr	DNF	CWBG	DNFG
League	80 (Note: Includes two matches in the 2014 playoffs (1–1, Cowdenbeath 3–0 Dunfermline).)	28	16	36	118	137
Scottish Cup	6	1	1	4	11	16
League Cup	8	0	1	7	7	23
Challenge Cup	2	0	0	2	2	6
Total	96	29	18	49	138	182

=== Cowdenbeath v East Fife ===
- First meeting: 16 November 1921, 1921–22 Scottish Division Two
- Next meeting: To be confirmed.

As of: 10 October 2020.

Competition	GP	CWB	Dr	EAF	CWBG	EAFG
League	105	36	29	40	170	175
Scottish Cup	1	0	0	1	1	2
League Cup	6	4	0	2	13	8
Challenge Cup	4	2	1	1	7	3
Total	116	42	30	44	191	188

=== Cowdenbeath v Raith Rovers ===
- First meeting: 14 October 1905, 1905–06 Scottish Division Two
- Next meeting: To be confirmed.

As of: 10 July 2021.

Competition	GP	CWB	Dr	RAR	CWBG	RARG
League	94	29	23	42	137	171
Scottish Cup	1	0	0	1	0	2
League Cup	12	6	1	5	16	21
Challenge Cup	3	1	0	2	2	3
Total	110	36	24	50	155	197

=== Totals for four clubs ===
As of: 22 August 2025.

Competition	GP	CWB	DNF	EAF	RAR	Dr	CWBG	DNF	EAFG	RARG
League	521	94	98	93	115	123	428	396	409	475
Scottish Cup	23	1	8	6	5	3	12	27	20	18
League Cup	67	10	13	15	18	11 (Note: Includes 2 penalty shootout victories for Dunfermline (in 2017 vs East Fife & in 2023 vs Raith) following a draw, counted as a win in the source but usually considered a draw)	36	52	75	77
Challenge Cup	14	3	4	1	5	1	11	9	6	11
Total	625	107	123	114	143	138	487	484	510	581
Total goals:							2,062			

== Kelty Hearts ==
Upon being promoted to the SPFL in 2021, Kelty Hearts became the fifth member from the Kingdom of Fife. Playing in the 2021–22 Scottish League Two, they will play against Cowdenbeath, with the two teams separated by just 2.7 miles.

== Achievements by Fife clubs ==
Up to and including season 2022–23.

Club	Top tier seasons	Scottish League (level 1)			Scottish League (level 2)		Scottish League (level 3)		Scottish League (level 4)		Scottish Cup		League Cup		Challenge Cup	
Club	Top tier seasons	W	RU	3rd	W	RU	W	RU	W	RU	W	RU	W	RU	W	RU
Cowdenbeath	11	0	0	0	3	3	1	1	1	2	0	0	0	0	0	0
Dunfermline Athletic	38	0	0	2	4	9	3	2	0	0	2	3	0	3	0	1
East Fife	14	0	0	2	1	2	0	2	2	1	1	2	3	0	0	0
Raith Rovers	37	0	0	1	6	4	2	4	0	0	0	1	1	1	3	1
