= 2024–25 East of Scotland Football League =

East of Scotland Football League
- Season: 2024–25
- Dates: 26 July 2024 – 17 May 2025
- Champions: Musselburgh Athletic

The 2024–25 East of Scotland Football League was the 96th season of the East of Scotland Football League, and the 11th season with its top division as part of the sixth tier of the Scottish football pyramid system. Broxburn Athletic were the reigning champions but were unable to defend their title after gaining promotion to the Lowland Football League.

Musselburgh Athletic won the Premier Division title for the first time, finishing four points clear of Hill of Beath Hawthorn. They were unable to be promoted to the 2025–26 Lowland Football League, losing 1–3 to Clydebank in the Lowland League play-off.

== Teams ==
The following teams changed division after the 2023–24 season.

=== To East of Scotland Football League ===
Relegated from Lowland Football League

- Edinburgh University

=== From East of Scotland Football League ===
Promoted to Lowland Football League

- Broxburn Athletic

== Premier Division ==
East of Scotland Football League Premier Division
- Season: 2024–25
- Dates: 27 July 2024 – 17 May 2025
- Champions: Musselburgh Athletic
- Relegated: Edinburgh University; Luncarty; Tynecastle
- Matches: 240
- Goals: 770 (3.21 per match)
- Biggest home win: Sauchie Juniors 7–1 Hutchison Vale (21 December 2024)
- Biggest away win: Tynecastle 0–6 Musselburgh Athletic (3 September 2024); Dundonald Bluebell 0–6 Hill of Beath Hawthorn (7 September 2024); Luncarty 1–7 Haddington Athletic (5 October 2024)
- Highest scoring: Jeanfield Swifts 7–2 Glenrothes (4 September 2024)
- Longest winning run: 5 matches: Jeanfield Swifts & Musselburgh Athletic
- Longest unbeaten run: 14 matches: Hill of Beath Hawthorn
- Longest winless run: 12 matches: Luncarty
- Longest losing run: 6 matches: Edinburgh University & Tynecastle
- All statistics correct as of 17 May 2025.

Musselburgh Athletic won the East of Scotland Football League title for the first time, sealing the championship with a round of matches to spare with a 4–0 victory at Sauchie Juniors on 3 May 2025, allowing them to maintain their four-point lead over Hill of Beath Hawthorn. They were unable to be promoted to the 2025–26 Lowland Football League, losing to Clydebank in the Lowland League play-off.

Location of teams in 2024–25 East of Scotland Football League Premier Division

Promoted from 2023–24 First Division:

- Dunipace
- St Andrews United
- Whitburn

Relegated to 2024–25 First Division:

- Inverkeithing Hillfield Swifts
- Crossgates Primrose
- Kinnoull

=== Stadia and locations ===
Team	Location	Home ground	Surface	Capacity	Seats
Dunbar United ^{[SFA]}	Dunbar	New Countess Park	Grass	1,200	191
Dundonald Bluebell ^{[SFA]}	Cardenden	Moorside Park	Grass	1,000	0
Dunipace ^{[SFA]}	Denny	Westfield Park	Artificial	2,000	0
Edinburgh University ^{[SFA]}	Edinburgh	New Peffermill Stadium	Grass	1,100	100
Glenrothes	Glenrothes	Warout Stadium	Grass	2,000	730
Haddington Athletic ^{[SFA]}	Haddington	Millfield Park	Grass	1,200	0
Hill of Beath Hawthorn ^{[SFA]}	Hill of Beath	Keir's Park	Grass	1,080	0
Hutchison Vale ^{[SFA]}	Pilton, Edinburgh	Ainslie Park (Note: Hutchison Vale are ground-sharing with The Spartans.)	Artificial	3,534	854
Jeanfield Swifts ^{[SFA]}	Perth	Riverside Stadium	Grass	1,000	0
Luncarty	Luncarty	Brownlands Park	Grass	1,000	0
Musselburgh Athletic ^{[SFA]}	Musselburgh	Olivebank Stadium	Grass	1,500	0
Penicuik Athletic ^{[SFA]}	Penicuik	Montgomery Park	Grass	1,500	0
Sauchie Juniors ^{[SFA]}	Sauchie	Beechwood Park	Grass	2,500	200
St Andrews United ^{[SFA]}	St Andrews	Recreation Park	Grass	766	0
Tynecastle ^{[SFA]}	Slateford, Edinburgh	Meggetland Sports Complex	Grass	3,000	500
Whitburn	Whitburn	Central Park	Grass	3,000	38

Notes

All grounds are equipped with floodlights, except Warout Stadium (Glenrothes), Brownlands Park (Luncarty), and Central Park (Whitburn).

=== League table ===
Pos	Team	Pld	W	D	L	GF	GA	GD	Pts	Promotion, qualification or relegation
1	Musselburgh Athletic (C)	30	22	4	4	79	34	+45	70	Qualification for the Lowland League play-off
2	Hill of Beath Hawthorn	30	20	6	4	74	31	+43	66	
3	Jeanfield Swifts	30	17	6	7	62	31	+31	57	
4	Dundonald Bluebell	30	14	4	12	51	51	0	46	
5	Dunbar United	30	12	9	9	50	41	+9	45	
6	Dunipace	30	13	6	11	44	45	−1	45	
7	Whitburn	30	12	7	11	54	42	+12	43	
8	Haddington Athletic	30	12	7	11	48	44	+4	43	
9	St Andrews United	30	10	11	9	45	44	+1	41	
10	Glenrothes	30	12	5	13	42	62	−20	41	
11	Penicuik Athletic	30	11	7	12	50	44	+6	40	
12	Hutchison Vale	30	9	7	14	34	55	−21	34	
13	Sauchie Juniors (Note: Sauchie Juniors deducted 3 points for fielding ineligible players in their 2–3 defeat against Hill of Beath Hawthorn.)	30	9	7	14	46	49	−3	31	
14	Tynecastle (R)	30	5	7	18	32	58	−26	22	Relegation to the First Division
15	Edinburgh University (R)	30	5	6	19	32	67	−35	21	Relegation to the First Division
16	Luncarty (R)	30	5	5	20	27	72	−45	20	Relegation to the First Division

Source: eosfl.com
Rules for classification: 1) Points; 2) Goal difference; 3) Number of goals scored
(C) Champions; (R) Relegated

=== Results ===
Home \ Away	DNB	DBL	DPC	EDU	GLE	HAD	HOB	HUT	JFS	LUN	MUS	PEN	SAU	STA	TYN	WHB
Dunbar United		4–1	2–2	1–1	1–2	3–0	0–2	1–1	1–1	2–1	2–1	2–1	2–0	1–1	2–0	0–2
Dundonald Bluebell	1–2		3–0	5–1	0–3	2–0	0–6	0–0	0–4	1–4	1–2	0–2	2–0	2–0	5–1	4–2
Dunipace	4–1	2–2		4–1	1–1	2–0	0–5	5–0	2–0	2–0	3–2	1–3	2–0	2–0	0–1	0–2
Edinburgh University	0–4	2–2	1–1		2–1	1–2	1–6	1–2	0–1 (Note: Match originally finished 2–1 to Edinburgh University, but match awarded 1–0 to Jeanfield Swifts as Edinburgh University fielded an ineligible player.)	0–1	0–4	2–1	1–0 (Note: Match originally finished 2–0 to Sauchie Juniors, but match awarded 1–0 to Edinburgh University as Sauchie Juniors fielded ineligible players.)	1–3	1–0	0–3
Glenrothes	2–1	1–1	4–2	1–0		2–2	0–2	3–0	0–2	2–1	0–2	1–4	0–0	2–1	1–0	2–2
Haddington Athletic	0–0	5–2	0–1	1–0	5–2		1–4	1–1	1–4	1–0	1–3	0–1	1–0 (Note: Match originally finished 3–0 to Sauchie Juniors, but match awarded 1–0 to Haddington Athletic as Sauchie Juniors fielded ineligible players.)	2–3	4–2	3–0
Hill of Beath Hawthorn	3–3	1–0	1–0	4–3	5–1	2–2		2–0	2–1	3–0	2–0	1–4	3–2	4–1	2–1	0–1
Hutchison Vale	3–3	0–1	0–1	2–0	1–3	0–1	0–1		1–0	4–0	1–4	3–2	2–1	1–2	1–0	1–0
Jeanfield Swifts	2–1	1–3	3–0	1–1	7–2	1–2	1–1	1–2		3–0	5–1	2–0	2–2	1–1	2–1	1–0
Luncarty	1–4	4–3	1–3	3–1	0–1	1–7	1–5	1–1	1–3		1–3	0–2	1–0 (Note: Match originally finished 4–2 to Sauchie Juniors, but match awarded 1–0 to Luncarty as Sauchie Juniors fielded ineligible players.)	3–3	0–3	0–1
Musselburgh Athletic	2–1	2–0	1–1	5–1	5–1	2–0	2–1	4–1	2–1	5–0		1–1	1–0	2–2	3–2	3–2
Penicuik Athletic	2–2	0–2	3–1	2–1	4–0	0–2	1–2	1–1	1–1	2–2	1–1		1–3	0–0	2–3	5–3
Sauchie Juniors	3–2	0–1 (Note: Match originally finished 1–0 to Sauchie Juniors, but match awarded 1–0 to Dundonald Bluebell as Sauchie Juniors fielded ineligible players.)	3–0	0–4	3–2	1–1	2–1	7–1	2–5	3–0	0–4	3–2		0–0	4–0	2–3
St Andrews United	2–0	2–4	1–1	2–2	2–0	3–2	0–0	2–0	0–1	4–0	1–3	2–0	1–1		1–2	0–3
Tynecastle	0–1	0–2	0–1	3–3	1–2	0–0	1–1	2–2	0–2	0–0	0–6	1–0	3–3	2–3		1–2
Whitburn	0–1	0–1	4–0	2–0	5–0	1–1	2–2	5–2	1–3	0–0	2–3	1–2	1–1	2–2	2–2	

Source: East of Scotland Fixture List
Legend: Blue = home team win; Yellow = draw; Red = away team win.

== First Division ==
Location of teams in 2024–25 East of Scotland Football League First Division

Camelon Juniors sealed the league title on 3 May 2025 with two rounds of matches to spare, winning the championship with a 1–0 victory over Crossgates Primrose, which maintained their seven-point lead over Bo'ness Athletic, who were promoted for the third consecutive season.

Promoted from 2023–24 Second Division:

- Bo'ness Athletic
- Edinburgh South
- Thornton Hibs

Relegated to 2024–25 Second Division:

- Oakley United
- Vale of Leithen
- Rosyth (folded)

=== Stadia and locations ===
Team	Location	Home ground	Surface	Capacity	Seats	Floodlit
Arniston Rangers	Gorebridge	Newbyres Park	Grass	1,500	0	No
Blackburn United ^{[SFA]}	Blackburn	New Murrayfield Park	Artificial	1,500	0	Yes
Bo'ness Athletic	Bo'ness	Newtown Park	Artificial	2,000	0	Yes
Camelon Juniors ^{[SFA]}	Camelon	Carmuirs Park	Grass	2,000	100	Yes
Crossgates Primrose	Crossgates	Humbug Park	Grass	1,500	0	No
Edinburgh South	Colinton, Edinburgh	Paties Road Stadium (Note: Edinburgh South ground-shared with Edinburgh United.)	Grass	1,200	200	No
Heriot-Watt University	Riccarton, Edinburgh	John Brydson Arena	Artificial	250	195	Yes
Inverkeithing Hillfield Swifts	Dalgety Bay	Dalgety Bay Sports & Leisure Centre	Artificial	800	0	Yes
Kinnoull	Perth	Tulloch Park	Grass	1,000	0	Yes
Kirkcaldy & Dysart	Kirkcaldy	Denfield Park	Grass	1,200	20	No
Leith Athletic	Edinburgh	Meadowbank Stadium	Artificial	1,748	499	Yes
Lochore Welfare	Crosshill	Central Park	Grass	1,200	0	No
Newtongrange Star ^{[SFA]}	Newtongrange	New Victoria Park	Grass	2,275	30	Yes
Preston Athletic ^{[SFA]}	Prestonpans	Pennypit Park	Grass	1,500	313	Yes
Thornton Hibs	Thornton	Memorial Park	Grass	1,500	0	No
Whitehill Welfare ^{[SFA]}	Rosewell	Ferguson Park	Grass	2,454	192	Yes

=== League table ===
Pos	Team	Pld	W	D	L	GF	GA	GD	Pts	Promotion or relegation
1	Camelon Juniors (C, P)	30	23	4	3	83	22	+61	73	Promotion to the Premier Division
2	Bo'ness Athletic (P)	30	20	4	6	91	34	+57	64	Promotion to the Premier Division
3	Newtongrange Star (P)	30	18	5	7	67	39	+28	59	Promotion to the Premier Division
4	Heriot-Watt University	30	16	9	5	71	49	+22	57	
5	Crossgates Primrose	30	15	5	10	55	51	+4	50	
6	Edinburgh South	30	14	5	11	57	49	+8	47	
7	Kirkcaldy & Dysart	30	12	9	9	53	52	+1	45	
8	Whitehill Welfare	30	11	4	15	39	49	−10	37	
9	Thornton Hibs	30	10	6	14	47	68	−21	36	
10	Preston Athletic	30	10	5	15	50	70	−20	35	
11	Blackburn United	30	9	7	14	57	65	−8	34	
12	Lochore Welfare	30	9	7	14	35	52	−17	34	
13	Leith Athletic	30	9	5	16	36	54	−18	32	
14	Arniston Rangers (R)	30	6	12	12	49	57	−8	30	Relegation to the Second Division
15	Kinnoull (R)	30	6	5	19	47	84	−37	23	Relegation to the Second Division
16	Inverkeithing Hillfield Swifts (R)	30	4	4	22	32	74	−42	16	Relegation to the Second Division

Source: eosfl.com
Rules for classification: 1) Points; 2) Goal difference; 3) Number of goals scored
(C) Champions; (P) Promoted; (R) Relegated

=== Results ===
Home \ Away	ARN	BLU	BOA	CML	CRS	EDS	HER	IHS	KIN	KDY	LEI	LOW	NGS	PRE	THO	WHI
Arniston Rangers		2–2	0–6	1–2	2–3	0–2	2–1	1–1	3–3	1–1	4–2	1–0	1–1	1–1	4–0	1–1
Blackburn United	3–2		2–2	0–4	2–2	3–3	0–3	3–0	1–3	2–2	2–0	6–3	0–2	3–4	4–1	4–1
Bo'ness Athletic	2–1	2–1		0–0	2–1	6–0	3–1	4–2	7–0	4–1	1–0	5–0	3–1	4–3	4–0	1–2
Camelon Juniors	3–0	0–0	2–1		1–0	4–0	5–0	4–0	7–2	3–3	1–2	4–0	2–4	4–2	1–0	4–0
Crossgates Primrose	3–2	4–1	2–1	1–2		2–0	1–1	3–2	3–0	2–1	2–1	4–2	1–2	3–1	1–4	2–0
Edinburgh South	2–2 (Note: Match played at Saughton Enclosure.)	2–0 (Note: Match played at Saughton Enclosure.)	2–4 (Note: Match played at Meggetland Sports Complex.)	1–2 (Note: Match played at Saughton Enclosure.)	7–0 (Note: Match played at Saughton Enclosure.)		1–1 (Note: Match played at East Peffermill.)	1–0 (Note: Match played at Saughton Enclosure.)	2–0 (Note: Match played at Newbyres Park, Gorebridge.)	4–0 (Note: Match played at Newbyres Park, Gorebridge.)	1–1 (Note: Match played at Saughton Enclosure.)	4–1 (Note: Match played at Saughton Enclosure.)	0–2 (Note: Match played at Newbyres Park, Gorebridge.)	2–0	2–0 (Note: Match played at Saughton Enclosure.)	1–0 (Note: Match played at Newbyres Park, Gorebridge.)
Heriot-Watt University	3–2 (Note: Match played on the Oriam grass pitch.)	3–0	4–3	1–0 (Note: Match played indoors at Oriam.)	1–1 (Note: Match played indoors at Oriam.)	3–1 (Note: Match played indoors at Oriam.)		4–2	3–1	2–0	0–0	1–1	3–2	8–1	2–1	2–2
Inverkeithing Hillfield Swifts	1–1	1–3	0–4	0–4	0–4	0–3	3–4		1–3	2–2	0–2	1–3	1–2	2–3	6–1	0–2
Kinnoull	2–3	0–4	1–9	0–2	2–2	4–1	3–3	1–2		4–3	1–2	2–3	2–3	2–0	0–2	0–2
Kirkcaldy & Dysart	2–1	3–2	0–3	0–5	3–0	3–1	0–3	6–2	3–2		2–0	1–1	0–0	1–1	4–0	2–0
Leith Athletic	3–3	0–1	1–0	1–1	1–4	0–2	1–4	0–1	3–2	2–2		0–2	0–3	3–0	1–3	0–1
Lochore Welfare	0–0	3–1	1–2	0–2	0–2	0–3	3–3	0–0	0–0	0–1	4–1		0–1	1–3	1–0	2–1
Newtongrange Star	3–1	5–2	1–1	1–4	4–1	5–3	5–1	3–0	2–2	2–1	1–2	2–1		1–1	4–0	3–1
Preston Athletic	0–5	3–1	3–2	0–3	1–1	1–1	2–4	1–0	3–4	1–3	2–1	1–2	1–0		3–4	2–3
Thornton Hibs	2–2	2–1	2–2	2–4	1–0	4–2	2–2	1–2	1–0	2–2	3–4	0–0	2–1	1–5		2–2
Whitehill Welfare	2–0	3–3	0–3	0–3	4–0	1–3	1–0	1–0	4–1	0–1	1–2	0–1	2–1	0–1	2–4	

Source: East of Scotland Fixture List
Legend: Blue = home team win; Yellow = draw; Red = away team win.

== Second Division ==
Location of teams in 2024–25 East of Scotland Football League Second Division

Armadale Thistle won the league title on 19 April 2025, following a 0–3 defeat for Bathgate Thistle against Vale of Leithen which meant that Armadale Thistle could not be caught.

Promoted from 2023–24 Third Division:

- Bathgate Thistle
- Harthill Royal
- West Calder United

Relegated to 2024–25 Third Division:

- Ormiston Primrose
- Newburgh
- Edinburgh United

=== Stadia and locations ===
Team	Location	Home ground	Surface	Capacity	Seats	Floodlit
Armadale Thistle	Armadale	Volunteer Park	Artificial	2,000	300	Yes
Bathgate Thistle	Bathgate	Creamery Park	Grass	2,000	0	Yes
Burntisland Shipyard ^{[SFA]}	Burntisland	Recreation Park	Grass	1,000	0	Yes
Coldstream ^{[SFA]}	Coldstream	Home Park	Grass	1,000	0	Yes
Dalkeith Thistle ^{[SFA]}	Dalkeith	King's Park	Grass	1,500	0	Yes
Easthouses Lily Miners Welfare ^{[SFA]}	Easthouses	Newbattle Complex	Grass	1,500	100	Yes
Edinburgh College	Edinburgh	Riccarton Campus (Note: Edinburgh College ground-shared with Heriot-Watt University.)	Artificial	250	195	Yes
Harthill Royal	Harthill	Gibbshill Park	Grass	1,800	0	No
Kennoway Star Hearts	Star	Treaton Park	Grass	1,000	0	No
Oakley United	Oakley	Blairwood Park	Grass	1,500	0	No
Peebles Rovers	Peebles	Whitestone Park	Grass	1,250	250	No
Stirling University reserves	Stenhousemuir	Ochilview Park (Note: Stirling University reserves ground-shared with Stenhousemuir.)	Artificial	3,746	626	Yes
Tweedmouth Rangers	Berwick-upon-Tweed	Shielfield Park (Note: Tweedmouth Rangers ground-shared with Berwick Rangers.)	Grass	4,099	1,366	Yes
Vale of Leithen ^{[SFA]}	Innerleithen	Victoria Park	Grass	1,000	0	Yes
West Calder United	West Calder	Hermand Park	Grass	1,000	0	No

=== League table ===
Pos	Team	Pld	W	D	L	GF	GA	GD	Pts	Promotion or relegation
1	Armadale Thistle (C, P)	28	21	2	5	76	23	+53	65	Promotion to the First Division
2	Easthouses Lily Miners Welfare (P)	28	16	4	8	61	57	+4	52	Promotion to the First Division
3	Bathgate Thistle (P)	28	16	2	10	52	35	+17	50	Promotion to the First Division
4	West Calder United	28	15	2	11	73	53	+20	47	
5	Oakley United	28	14	5	9	53	43	+10	47	
6	Kennoway Star Hearts	28	11	8	9	61	51	+10	41	
7	Edinburgh College	28	12	5	11	57	58	−1	41	
8	Burntisland Shipyard	28	11	4	13	48	54	−6	37	
9	Stirling University reserves	28	11	3	14	51	58	−7	36	
10	Peebles Rovers	28	10	5	13	38	59	−21	35	
11	Coldstream	28	9	7	12	46	55	−9	34	
12	Dalkeith Thistle	28	10	3	15	43	55	−12	33	
13	Harthill Royal	28	9	5	14	43	55	−12	32	
14	Vale of Leithen (R)	28	9	1	18	51	76	−25	28	Relegation to the Third Division
15	Tweedmouth Rangers (R)	28	6	4	18	42	63	−21	22	Relegation to the Third Division

Source: eosfl.com
Rules for classification: 1) Points; 2) Goal difference; 3) Number of goals scored
(C) Champions; (P) Promoted; (R) Relegated

== Third Division ==
Location of teams in 2024–25 East of Scotland Football League Third Division

Lochgelly Albert won the league title on 3 May 2025 with a 7–0 victory at Edinburgh Community, and coupled with a 0–3 defeat for Linton Hotspur at Fauldhouse United, opened up an unassailable 12-point lead at the top.

=== Stadia and locations ===
Club	Location	Home Ground	Surface	Capacity	Seats	Floodlit
Edinburgh Community	Warriston, Edinburgh	St Mark's Park	Grass	1,000	0	No
Edinburgh United	Colinton, Edinburgh	Paties Road Stadium	Grass	1,200	200	No
Fauldhouse United	Fauldhouse	Park View	Grass	1,500	80	No
Hawick Royal Albert ^{[SFA]}	Hawick	Albert Park	Grass	1,000	500	Yes
Linton Hotspur	West Linton	New Moor Road	Grass	1,000	63	No
Livingston United	Livingston	Station Park	Grass	1,500	0	No
Lochgelly Albert	Lochgelly	Gardiners Park	Grass	1,500	0	No
Newburgh	Newburgh	East Shore Park	Grass	1,000	0	No
Ormiston Primrose	Ormiston	New Recreation Park	Grass	1,000	0	No
Pumpherston	Pumpherston	Recreation Park	Grass	1,500	0	No
Stoneyburn	Stoneyburn	Beechwood Park	Grass	1,500	0	No

=== League table ===
Pos	Team	Pld	W	D	L	GF	GA	GD	Pts	Promotion
1	Lochgelly Albert (C, P)	30	22	4	4	103	39	+64	70	Promotion to the Second Division
2	Linton Hotspur (P)	30	17	4	9	54	50	+4	55	Promotion to the Second Division
3	Fauldhouse United (P)	30	13	10	7	60	39	+21	49	Promotion to the Second Division
4	Hawick Royal Albert	30	12	10	8	70	61	+9	46	
5	Stoneyburn	30	12	9	9	61	49	+12	45	
6	Livingston United	30	13	2	15	57	72	−15	41	
7	Edinburgh United	30	11	7	12	64	59	+5	40	
8	Pumpherston	30	9	10	11	62	63	−1	37	
9	Newburgh	30	10	3	17	53	68	−15	33	
10	Ormiston Primrose	30	6	7	17	33	73	−40	25	
11	Edinburgh Community	30	5	4	21	52	96	−44	19	

Source: eosfl.com
Rules for classification: 1) Points; 2) Goal difference; 3) Number of goals scored
(C) Champions; (P) Promoted

== Notes ==
^{SFA} Club with an SFA licence eligible to participate in the Lowland League promotion play-off (should they win the Premier Division), and also compete in the Scottish Cup.
