= Scottish Junior Football Association, East Region =

Association football league in Scotland

The Scottish Junior Football Association, East Region is one of two regions of the SJFA, which currently organises the Midlands League and local cup competitions.

The SJFA was previously split into six regions, but in 2002 the decision was taken to reform into three to try to ensure more games between the top clubs and hence increase their revenues; at that time the East Region was created by amalgamating the former East (Lothians), Fife and Tayside Regions. From 2017, the majority of the region's ~60 member clubs left the SJFA to join the East of Scotland Football League within the Scottish football league system's pyramid structure. in 2021, what remained of the East Region (17 Tayside clubs) was integrated into this 'senior' pyramid as the Midlands League alongside the relatively unchanged SJFA North Region divisions, below the Highland Football League – the third SJFA region, West, had already disbanded a year earlier and formed its own divisions in the senior pyramid.

== League structure ==
=== Until 2006–07 ===
For season 2002–03, twelve clubs from the East (Lothians), Fife and Tayside leagues in the eastern part of Scotland combined to create the East Super League; this was fed by the existing regional leagues: Tayside Premier (with Tayside Division One below), Fife District League and Lothians Division One (with Lothians Division Two below.) A similar change occurred in the west of Scotland where the Ayrshire and Central leagues merged entirely to form a West Region. A year earlier, the North Region was renamed, but this had no impact on the system itself.

=== 2006–07 to 2012–13 ===
In 2006, a further reorganisation led to the creation of another region-wide tier below the East Super League, known as the East Premier League. Below this, the Regional leagues were streamlined into single North (Tayside), Central (Fife) and South (Lothians) Divisions. To balance the numbers in these new leagues, the majority of Perthshire clubs were re-allocated from the North to the Central Division (exceptions to this were Blairgowrie and Coupar Angus who remained in the North Division setup).

As of the end of 2006–07 season, clubs were promoted and relegated between the Super League and the Premier League. One club from each of the lowest-tier divisions would be promoted to the Premier League, with three Premier League sides relegated to a regional division corresponding to their geographical area.

=== 2013–14 to 2016–17 ===
As agreed at the 2011–12 East Region AGM, the leagues were restructured into four divisions from the 2013–14 season. The Super League and Premier League were expanded from twelve to sixteen clubs while the regional divisions were merged into two from the current three and branded as North and South; clubs in the Central division were split between the two new leagues on a geographical basis. The League Cup competitions which traditionally opened the season were also scrapped as part of these proposals.

=== 2017–18 to 2018–19 ===
In 2017, Kelty Hearts left the league to join the East of Scotland Football League in the senior pyramid. The following April, thirteen clubs—most of them from the East Juniors—moved to the East of Scotland League for the 2018–19 season. When the window for applications was extended, even more East Region clubs quit the Junior grade, bringing the total of clubs leaving Junior football that summer to 24:

- Arniston Rangers
- Blackburn United
- Bo'ness United
- Bonnyrigg Rose Athletic
- Broxburn Athletic
- Camelon Juniors
- Craigroyston
- Crossgates Primrose
- Dalkeith Thistle
- Dunbar United
- Dundonald Bluebell
- Easthouses Lily MW
- Edinburgh United
- Haddington Athletic
- Hill of Beath Hawthorn
- Jeanfield Swifts
- Linlithgow Rose
- Musselburgh Athletic
- Newtongrange Star
- Oakley United
- Penicuik Athletic
- Sauchie Juniors
- St Andrews United
- Tranent Juniors

The loss of clubs caused the league to restructure from four divisions to three, effectively removing the Premier League and rearranging the 36 clubs into a 12-team Super League with two 12-team North and South divisions below. Glenrothes and Kinnoull also made the move to the senior pyramid in summer 2019.

=== From 2019–20 ===
The entire region was split into north and south sections, each containing a 10-team Super League and a 8 or 10-team Premier League below. Four clubs joined the South Premier League: Bo'ness United Junior, Linlithgow Rose Community, Syngenta, and Sauchie Juniors Community.

In April 2020, the 2019–20 season was declared null and void due to the COVID-19 pandemic, and the next month it was confirmed that a further eight clubs, mostly from Fife, were leaving the East Juniors for the East of Scotland League:

- Kennoway Star Hearts
- Kirkcaldy & Dysart
- Lochgelly Albert
- Lochore Welfare
- Luncarty
- Newburgh
- Rosyth
- Thornton Hibs

For the 2020–21 season, the remaining 30 clubs were merged into a single tier split into a Tayside League and Lothian League, later renamed Premiership North (17 clubs) and Premiership South (13 clubs). Matches restarted on 21 November 2020, but the season was declared null and void again on 16 March 2021.

In April 2021 another eleven clubs announced they were leaving the East Juniors for the East of Scotland League:

- Armadale Thistle
- Bathgate Thistle
- Bo'ness United (now called Bo'ness Athletic}
- Fauldhouse United
- Harthill Royal (applied to join West of Scotland Football League)
- Livingston United
- Pumpherston
- Stoneyburn
- Syngenta
- West Calder United
- Whitburn

Also in April 2021 it was announced that discussions were ongoing for clubs in the East Premiership North to form Midlands League at Tier 6 in the Scottish football league system, that would ultimately see clubs in the Midlands League play off against those in the North Caledonian League and North Superleague for a place in the Highland League. Although there was no official announcement of the league's formation, the East Region announced the fixtures for the 2021-22 season straight away on 21 June, with 19 clubs shown as league members, Dundee St James and Letham being new clubs in addition to all members of the 2020–21 East Premiership North.

== Cup competitions ==
There are a number of cup competitions in the East Region:

- East Region League Cup - Known as the Thorntons Property East Region League Cup under a sponsorship arrangement, this tournament was introduced for the 2018–19 season to compensate for a reduced number of league fixtures.
- North and Tayside Inter-Regional Cup - Known as the Quest Engineering Cup for sponsorship purposes, this is a knockout tournament for Midlands League and North Region clubs and is administered by a joint committee. First played for in 1988, clubs play early rounds in their own region with eight sides from each area progressing to the last sixteen.

Inactive

- Prior to league reconstruction in 2013, clubs also competed in one of three League Cup competitions at the beginning of the season:
  - DJ Laing League Cup. This tournament was for former Tayside Region clubs excluding Perthshire sides affiliated to the Central Division. Clubs initially competed in groups (sections) with the group winners advancing to a knockout semi-final stage. In all league cup competitions, matches in the group stages were played under league rules so a player was not cup-tied by turning out for a particular club.
  - ACA Sports League Cup. This tournament was for former Fife Region clubs and all other teams affiliated to the Central Division. Clubs initially competed in four groups, with group winners advancing to a knockout semi-final stage.
  - Dechmont Forklift League Cup. This tournament was for former East (Lothian) Region clubs. Clubs initially competed in four groups, with group winners advancing to a knockout semi-final stage.
- Fife & Lothians Cup - Known as the V Tech SMT Fife and Lothians Cup under a sponsorship arrangement, this tournament dates back to regionalisation in 1968 and is a knockout tournament for former East (Lothians) and Fife Region clubs in the current East Region. It is administered by a separate Fife & Lothians committee.
- East of Scotland Cup - Known as the DJ Laing East Region Cup under a sponsorship arrangement, this is a knockout tournament for all Midlands League clubs. The competition dates back to 1896–97 and was the most prestigious cup trophy in the former East Region.

=== Holders ===
2021–22 winners unless stated.

- North and Tayside Inter-Regional Cup: East Craigie
- East Region League Cup: Lochee United

== Roll of Honour ==
Season	East Super League	Lothians Division One	Lothians Division Two	Fife District League	Tayside Premier Division	Tayside First Division
2002–03	Tayport	Bo'ness United	Harthill Royal	Kelty Hearts	Lochee United	Scone Thistle
2003–04	Linlithgow Rose	Camelon Juniors	Broxburn Athletic	Thornton Hibs	Carnoustie Panmure	Blairgowrie
2004–05	Lochee United	Whitburn	Penicuik Athletic	Hill of Beath Hawthorn	Dundee North End	Downfield
2005–06	Tayport	Camelon Juniors	Broxburn Athletic	Oakley United	Kinnoull	Jeanfield Swifts

Season	East Super League	East Premier League	East Region South Division	East Region Central Division	East Region North Division
2006–07	Linlithgow Rose	Glenrothes	Newtongrange Star	Dundonald Bluebell	Forfar West End
2007–08	Lochee United	Bo'ness United	Fauldhouse United	Ballingry Rovers	Blairgowrie
2008–09	Bonnyrigg Rose Athletic	Musselburgh Athletic	Armadale Thistle	St Andrews United	Montrose Roselea
2009–10	Bo'ness United	Tayport	Broxburn Athletic	Thornton Hibs	Broughty Athletic
2010–11	Bo'ness United	St Andrews United	Sauchie Juniors	Oakley United	Downfield
2011–12	Bonnyrigg Rose Athletic	Sauchie Juniors	Dalkeith Thistle	Jeanfield Swifts	Dundee Violet
2012–13	Linlithgow Rose	Newtongrange Star	Fauldhouse United	Kinnoull	Kirriemuir Thistle

Season	East Superleague	East Premier League	East Region South Division	East Region North Division
2013–14	Bo'ness United	Penicuik Athletic	Edinburgh United	Dundee North End
2014–15	Kelty Hearts	Tayport	Haddington Athletic	Thornton Hibs
2015–16	Bonnyrigg Rose Athletic	Jeanfield Swifts	Tranent Juniors	Downfield
2016–17	Kelty Hearts	Sauchie	Kirriemuir Thistle	Dunbar United
2017–18	Bonnyrigg Rose Athletic	Musselburgh Athletic	Dundee North End	Pumpherston

Season	East Superleague	East Premier League North	East Premier League South
2018–19	Lochee United	Dundee North End	Pumpherston

Season	East Superleague North	East Superleague South	East Premier League North	East Premier League South
2019–20	All leagues null & void due to the COVID-19 pandemic. (Note: Using a 'points per game' algorithm applied in other leagues, Carnoustie Panmure (who were also leading the table when play stopped) would have been nominal champions of the Super League North section while Pumpherston and Thornton Hibs would have finished on equal points in the Super League South section; East Craigie would have been nominal champions in the Premier North, and Stoneyburn in the Premier South.)			

Season	East Region Premiership North	East Region Premiership South
2020–21	All leagues null & void due to the COVID-19 pandemic.	

Season	Midlands League
2021–22	Carnoustie Panmure
2022–23	Carnoustie Panmure
2023–24	Dundee North End
2024–25	Dundee North End

== Member clubs for 2022–23 season ==
There are 27 clubs in the East Region for the 2022–23 season. 19 clubs in the Midlands League organised by the East Region, and 8 clubs transferred to the East of Scotland League who have retained their membership of the SJFA.

Midlands League			East of Scotland League		
Club	Location	Home Ground	Club	Location	Home Ground
Arbroath Victoria	Arbroath	Ogilvy Park	Armadale Thistle	Armadale	Volunteer Park
Blairgowrie	Blairgowrie	Davie Park	Bathgate Thistle	Bathgate	Creamery Park
Brechin Victoria	Brechin	Victoria Park	Harthill Royal	Harthill	Gibbshill Park
Broughty Athletic	Dundee	Whitton Park	Livingston United	Livingston	Station Park
Carnoustie Panmure	Carnoustie	Laing Park	Pumpherston	Pumpherston	Recreation Park
Coupar Angus	Coupar Angus	Foxhall Park	Stoneyburn	Stoneyburn	Beechwood Park
Downfield	Dundee	Downfield Park	Syngenta	Stenhousemuir	Ochilview Park
Dundee North End	Dundee	North End Park	West Calder United	West Calder	Hermand Park
Dundee St James	Dundee	Fairfield Park			
Dundee Violet	Dundee	Glenesk Park			
East Craigie	Dundee	Craigie Park			
Forfar United	Forfar	Guthrie Park			
Forfar West End	Forfar	Strathmore Park			
Kirriemuir Thistle	Kirriemuir	Westview Park			
Letham	Perth	Seven Acres Park			
Lochee Harp	Dundee	Lochee Community Sports Hub			
Lochee United	Dundee	Thomson Park			
Scone Thistle	Scone	Farquharson Park			
Tayport	Tayport	Canniepairt			
