= Inverkeithing United F.C. =

Association football club based in Inverkeithing, Fife, Scotland

Inverkeithing United F.C
- Full name: Inverkeithing United Football Club
- Nickname: United or Divit
- Founded: 1906
- Ground: Games Park, New Ballast Bank, Inverkeithing High School; Inverkeithing
- Chairman: Jamie Kinnear
- League: Fife County League; 1913–1917, 1918–1927, 1929–1938, 1958–1959
- Website: www.inverkeithingunited.co.uk

Inverkeithing United Football Club are a Scottish football club based in Inverkeithing, Fife.

The team won the Scottish Junior Cup in 1912–13, and is a 4 time winner of both the Dunfermline Cup and the Cowdenbeath Cup. The club was reformed in 2017, and is currently accredited by the Scottish Football Association as a community football club.

== History ==
Inverkeithing United postcard, 1912-13.

The club began as a Juvenile side, Inverkeithing Renton, in 1906. The team won their first honours with the Fife Juvenile Cup in 1910–11. Inverkeithing Renton changed their name to Inverkeithing United when stepping up to the Junior grade in 1912. The club won the Scottish Junior Cup in their debut season at this level, defeating Dunipace Juniors 1–0 at Firhill Park, Glasgow in front of a crowd of 9,564. They were the first club from Fife to win the Junior Cup, and remained the only one to do so until St Andrews United triumphed in 1960.

Inverkeithing United squad, c. 1915.

The club played on through World War I using scratch sides drawn from military personnel, then enjoyed local success in Fife before going into abeyance in 1927 due to ground issues. Re-joining in 1929, the club continued to pick up local honours but closed down for a second time at the beginning of World War II.

Inverkeithing United reformed as a Juvenile side after the war, but only played one further season at Junior level in 1958–59. The club closed completely in 1963. Their Ballast Bank ground was used many years later by another Junior side, Dunfermline Jubilee Athletic, who arrived from Cowdenbeath in 1973 and left for Pitreavie Stadium in 1989. Jubilee are a predecessor of the current Rosyth.

In 2017, the club was reformed and gained accreditation from the SFA. The team provides a community pathway for U5 to U17 football players. Their current mission statement is to "develop footballers to be the best they can be in a fun, enjoyable and challenging environment".

== Honours ==
Scottish Junior Cup

- Winners: 1912–13

=== Other honours ===
- Fife County League winners: 1919–20, 1933–34
- Fife Junior Cup winners: 1925–26
- Cowdenbeath Cup winners: 1912–13, 1921–22, 1922–23, 1926–27
- Dunfermline Cup winners: 1925–26, 1931–32, 1932–33, 1933–34
- Fife Shield winners: 1919–20, 1923–24
