= Stewart Easton =

Scottish footballer

Personal information
- Date of birth: 10 October 1981 (age 45)
- Place of birth: Coatbridge, Scotland

Team information
- Current team: Thorniewood United (assistant manager)

Youth career
- Airdrie B.C.

Senior career*
Years	Team	Apps	(Gls)
1998–2000	Airdrieonians	24	(1)
2000	Greenock Morton (trial)	1	(0)
2000–2002	Albion Rovers	43	(1)
2002–2005	Stenhousemuir	51	(0)
2005–2007	Elgin City	37	(0)
2007–2015	Bathgate Thistle	?	(?)
2015–2017	Gartcairn Juniors	?	(?)
- * Club domestic league appearances and goals as of 14:48, 27 June 2022 (UTC)

Stewart Easton (born 10 October 1981) is a Scottish former football midfielder who is the assistant manager at Thorniewood United.

He last played for Gartcairn Juniors in the Scottish Junior Football Association, West Region. He has previously in the Scottish Football League with Airdrie, Greenock Morton, Albion Rovers, Stenhousemuir, where he was club captain, and Elgin City.

After moving into the Junior game, Easton was part of the Bathgate Thistle side which won the Scottish Junior Cup in 2008. He is the younger brother of former Dundee United player Craig Easton.

He became assistant manager of Gartcairn in 2015.

Easton moved to become assistant at Thorniewood United, working under new manager Gerry Bonham, in February 2017.

== Honours ==
Bathgate Thistle

- Scottish Junior Cup: Winner 2007-08
