= Murray McDermott =

Scottish footballer

Personal information
- Date of birth: 2 February 1950
- Place of birth: Edinburgh, Scotland
- Date of death: 2003 (aged 52–53)
- Position: Goalkeeper

Youth career
- –: Crossroads United
- 1966–1969: Rangers
- 1969–1970: Penicuik Athletic

Senior career*
Years	Team	Apps	(Gls)
1970–1981	Raith Rovers	365	(0)
1981–1983	Berwick Rangers	60	(0)
1983–1986	Greenock Morton	67	(0)
1986–1987	Arbroath	12	(0)
1987–1988	Meadowbank Thistle	15	(0)
1988	→ Partick Thistle (loan)	1	(0)
1988–1989	Hearts	0	(0)
Total		520	(0)
- * Club domestic league appearances and goals

Murray McDermott (2 February 1950 – 2003) was a Scottish professional footballer who played as a goalkeeper, making over 500 career appearances.

== Career ==
Born in Edinburgh, McDermott played for Crossroads United, Rangers, Penicuik Athletic, Raith Rovers, Berwick Rangers, Greenock Morton, Arbroath, Meadowbank Thistle, Partick Thistle and Hearts.

== See also ==
- List of footballers in Scotland by number of league appearances (500+)
