= Fife Junior Football League =

Scottish football league

The Fife Junior Football League was a football league competition under the jurisdiction of the Scottish Junior Football Association, which operated as the top league in Fife until a merger in 2002; it existed for a further four years as a second-tier league before the name was discontinued in 2006.

== History ==
The league was formed in 1913 from a merger between smaller competitions across the county, initially the Howe of Fife League (played between 1892 and 1913) and the West Fife County League (1893 to 1913), later joined by teams from the East Neuk League (1908 to 1924). It continued during World War I and had periods where there were sufficient numbers involved to have West and East sections whose winners would play off for the title. Due to anticipated problems with travelling distances, the Fife clubs chose not to join the Intermediate dispute of the late 1920s, instigated by clubs in the West of Scotland who broke away from the SJFA.

The league stopped for six seasons during World War II and lost a number of member teams in the late 1940s, but was still running in 1968 and considered sufficiently strong to form one of six 'regions' across Scotland in a re-organisation of Junior football at that time. The Fife area suffered from an economic decline in the subsequent decades, owing to the collapse of the mining industry which had provided the main source of employment in most towns and villages, with several teams folding and others struggling to continue as small isolated communities became impoverished and residents moved away.

As membership of the Fife League fell steadily, a few well-run clubs who had joined more recently than its oldest members became dominant, and in 2002 these teams were invited to form the new regional Superleague in the east of the country along with the leading teams in the East (Lothians) League and the Tayside League. Fife's setup was retained as a feeder division to the Superleague along with the other historic districts until 2006, when they were fully integrated into the East Region; Fife's section became the Central Division below the Super League and a new Premier Division, but it was disbanded in 2013, meaning the county was no longer represented separately in the Junior grade.

=== Later movement of Fife clubs ===
In 2018, a large group of East Junior clubs (including five from the Kingdom) followed the path taken by Kelty Hearts a year earlier and joined the East of Scotland Football League to take part in the Scottish football pyramid. With Glenrothes making the same switch in 2019, this left eight local clubs in the East Region, including Tayport and Kennoway Star Hearts who never played in the old Fife Junior League. A further seven clubs left for the senior ranks in 2020, leaving Tayport as the only Junior club remaining in Fife.

== Champions ==
=== 1913–1968 era ===
Key:

Club also won the Scottish Junior Cup (doubles in **bold**).
Club were also runners-up in the Scottish Junior Cup.

Season	Winner	Runner-up
1913–14	Glencraig Celtic	Kingseat Athletic
1914–15	Windygates Rovers	Glencraig Celtic
1915–16	Glencraig Celtic	Denbeath Star
1916–17	Denbeath Star	Glencraig Celtic
1917–18	Denbeath Star	Glencraig Celtic
1918–19	Glencraig Celtic	Hearts of Beath
1919–20	Inverkeithing United	Glencraig Celtic
1920–21	Kingseat Juniors	Hearts of Beath
1921–22 (Note: Denotes winner and finalist in playoff between winners of East and West Divisions.)	Kingseat Juniors	Wellesley Juniors
1922–23	Dunnikier Colliery Juniors	Kelty Rangers
1923–24	East Fife Juniors	Cupar Juniors
1924–25	Newburgh West End	Dunnikier Colliery Juniors
1925–26	Anstruther Rangers	Kelty Rangers
1926–27	St Andrews United	Wellesley Juniors
1927–28	St Andrews United	Lochgelly Celtic
1928–29	St Andrews United	Wellesley Juniors
1929–30	Rosslyn Juniors	Wellesley Juniors
1930–31	Bowhill Rovers	Rosslyn Juniors
1931–32	Rosslyn Juniors	Bowhill Rovers
1932–33	Rosslyn Juniors	Inverkeithing United
1933–34	Inverkeithing United	Bowhill Rovers
1934–35	Bowhill Rovers	Hearts of Beath
1935–36	Hearts of Beath	Bowhill Rovers
1936–37	Blairhall Colliery	Hearts of Beath
1937–38	Lochgelly Albert	Thornton Hibs
1938–39	Lochore Welfare	Rosslyn Juniors
1939–40	Dunnikier Colliery Juniors	Hearts of Beath
1940–41	Hearts of Beath	Kelty North End
1941–42	Not played	
1942–43	Not played	
1943–44	Not played	
1944–45	Not played	
1945–46	Not played	
1946–47	Lochgelly Albert	Blairhall Colliery
1947–48	Lochore Welfare	Auchtermuchty Juniors
1948–49	Lochgelly Albert	Kinglassie Colliery
1949–50	Rosyth Recreation	Lochgelly Albert
1950–51	Steelend Victoria	Nairn Thistle
1951–52	Dundonald Bluebell	St Andrews United
1952–53	Thornton Hibs	Dundonald Bluebell
1953–54	Lochore Welfare	Glencraig Colliery
1954–55	Lochgelly Albert	Dundonald Bluebell
1955–56	Lochore Welfare	Lochgelly Albert
1956–57	Dundonald Bluebell	Lochore Welfare
1957–58	Dundonald Bluebell	St Andrews United
1958–59	Thornton Hibs	St Andrews United
1959–60	**St Andrews United**	Frances Colliery
1960–61	St Andrews United	Blairhall Colliery
1961–62	Lochore Welfare	St Andrews United
1962–63	Lochore Welfare	Thornton Hibs
1963–64	Lochore Welfare	St Andrews United
1964–65	St Andrews United	Lochore Welfare
1965–66	Glenrothes	Lochore Welfare
1966–67	Glenrothes	Lochore Welfare
1967–68	Glenrothes	Newburgh Juniors

=== 1968–2002 era ===
Club also won the Scottish Junior Cup (doubles in **bold**).
Club were also runners-up in the Scottish Junior Cup.

Season	Winner	Runner-up
1968–69	Thornton Hibs	Lochore Welfare
1969–70	Glenrothes	Newburgh Juniors
1970–71	Glenrothes	Oakley United
1971–72	Oakley United	Lochore Welfare
1972–73 (Note: Denotes winner and finalist in playoff between winners of 'A' (West) and 'B' (East) Divisions.)	Newburgh Juniors	Lochgelly Albert
1973–74	Lochgelly Albert	Glenrothes
1974–75	**Glenrothes**	Newburgh Juniors
1975–76	Glenrothes	Comrie Colliery
1976–77	Newburgh Juniors	Glenrothes
1977–78	Glenrothes	Newburgh Juniors
1978–79 (Note: Denotes winner and finalist in playoff between winners of Divisions One and Two, arranged on merit – in both cases Oakley United, the Division One winners, won the overall championship.)	Oakley United	Clackmannan Juniors (Note: Glenrothes were Division One runners-up.)
1979–80	Oakley United	Tulliallan Thistle (Note: Halbeath Juniors were Division One runners-up.)
1980–81	Halbeath Juniors	Kelty Hearts
1981–82	Leven Juniors	Lochore Welfare
1982–83	Dundonald Bluebell	Kelty Hearts
1983–84	Glenrothes	Dundonald Bluebell
1984–85	Glenrothes	Clackmannan Juniors
1985–86	Oakley United	Glenrothes
1986–87	Hill of Beath Hawthorn	Oakley United
1987–88 (Note: Denotes winner and finalist in playoff between winners of Divisions 'A' and 'B', arranged by merit – in each case, the A Division winners were also the overall champions.)	Oakley United	Halbeath Juniors (Note: Kelty Hearts were A Division runners-up.)
1988–89	Hill of Beath Hawthorn	Thornton Hibs
1989–90	St Andrews United	Hill of Beath Hawthorn
1990–91	Kelty Hearts	Newburgh (Note: St Andrews United were A Division runners-up.)
1991–92	Kelty Hearts	Hill of Beath Hawthorn
1992–93	Kelty Hearts	Hill of Beath Hawthorn
1993–94	Hill of Beath Hawthorn	Oakley United
1994–95	Hill of Beath Hawthorn	Kelty Hearts
1995–96	Hill of Beath Hawthorn	Kelty Hearts
1996–97	Kelty Hearts	Hill of Beath Hawthorn
1997–98	Hill of Beath Hawthorn	Kelty Hearts
1998–99	Kelty Hearts	Hill of Beath Hawthorn
1999–2000	Hill of Beath Hawthorn	Kelty Hearts
2000–01	Oakley United	Hill of Beath Hawthorn
2001–02	Hill of Beath Hawthorn	Glenrothes

== List of winners ==
Club	1919–1968 era				1968–2002 era				Overall	
Club	Win	R-up	First win	Last win	Win	R-up	First win	Last win	Win	R-up
Glenrothes	3	0	1965–66	1967–68	7	4 (Note: Were 'Division A' runners-up on 1 additional occasion in a season with a playoff, but were not involved in this final.)	1969–70	1984–85	10	4
Hill of Beath Hawthorn	0	0	N/A		8	6	1986–87	2001–02	8	6
Lochore Welfare	7	4	1947–48	1963–64	0	3	N/A		7	7
St Andrews United	6	5	1927–28	1964–65	1	0	1989–90		6	6
Oakley United	0	0	N/A		6	3	1971–72	2000–01	6	3
Kelty Hearts	0	0	N/A		5	6 (Note: Were 'Division A' runners-up on 2 additional occasions in a season with a playoff, but were not involved in this final.)	1990–91	1998–99	5	6
Lochgelly Albert	4	2	1937–38	1954–55	1	1	1973–74		5	3
Dundonald Bluebell	3	2	1951–52	1957–58	1	1	1982–83		4	3
Newburgh	1	1	1924–25		2	3	1972–73	1976–77	3	4
Glencraig Celtic	3	4	1913–14	1918–19	0	0	N/A		3	4
Rosslyn Juniors	3	2	1929–30	1932–33	0	0	N/A		3	2
Hearts of Beath	2	5	1935–36	1940–41	0	0	N/A		2	5
Bowhill Rovers	2	3	1930–31	1934–35	0	0	N/A		2	3
Denbeath Star	2	1	1916–17	1917–18	0	0	N/A		2	1
Inverkeithing United	2	1	1919–20	1933–34	0	0	N/A		2	1
Kingseat Juniors	2	1	1920–21	1921–22	0	0	N/A		2	1
Dunnikier Colliery Juniors	2	1	1922–23	1939–40	0	0	N/A		2	1
Thornton Hibernian	1	2	1958–59		1	1	1968–69		2	3
Blairhall Colliery	1	2	1936–37		0	0	N/A		1	2
Steelend Victoria	1	0	1950–51		0	1	N/A		1	1
Halbeath Juniors	0	0	N/A		1	1	1980–81		1	1
Rosyth Recreation	1	0	1949–50		0	0	N/A		1	0
Windygates Rovers	1	0	1914–15		0	0	N/A		1	0
East Fife Juniors	1	0	1923–24		0	0	N/A		1	0
Anstruther Rangers	1	0	1925–26		0	0	N/A		1	0
Wellesley Juniors	0	4	N/A		0	0	N/A		0	4
Kelty Rangers	0	2	N/A		0	0	N/A		0	2
Clackmannan Juniors	0	0	N/A		0	2	N/A		0	2
Leven Juniors	0	0	N/A		1	0	1981–82		1	0
Cupar Juniors	0	1	N/A		0	0	N/A		0	1
Lochgelly Celtic	0	1	N/A		0	0	N/A		0	1
Auchtermuchty Juniors	0	1	N/A		0	0	N/A		0	1
Kinglassie Colliery	0	1	N/A		0	0	N/A		0	1
Nairn Thistle	0	1	N/A		0	0	N/A		0	1
Glencraig Colliery	0	1	N/A		0	0	N/A		0	1
Frances Colliery	0	1	N/A		0	0	N/A		0	1
Tulliallan Thistle	0	0	N/A		0	1	N/A		0	1
