= Lossiemouth United F.C. =

Association football club in Scotland

- Full name: Lossiemouth United Football Club
- Nickname: United or Lossie United
- Founded: 1919 (1964) present
- Ground: Phoenix Park; Coulardbank Road; Lossiemouth
- Coordinates: 57°42′51″N 3°17′33″W
- Chairman: Alex Lauriston
- Manager: Scott Campbell
- League: NoSFL Premier League
- 2025–26: NoSFL Premier League, 10th of 16
Home colours

Lossiemouth United Football Club are a Scottish football club from the town of Lossiemouth, Moray that play in the North of Scotland Football League. The original club formed in 1949, lasting for ten years. The second incarnation ran from 1964 to 2015. Home matches are played at the Coulardbank Playing Fields where a pitch was enclosed to comply with SJFA regulations. In earlier years, United had shared Grant Park with their Highland League neighbours, Lossiemouth F.C. Club colours are dark blue and black.

The team have endured mixed fortunes over time and spent a year in abeyance during 2000–01 while their sixth place North Division One finish in 2009–10 was the club's highest ever in the Superleague era. It was announced in July 2013 that the club will enter another period of abeyance during the 2013–14 season.

It was announced in the local press in February 2014 that Lossiemouth United would be returning after a year out with the board led by Ken Simpson and a new management team. The Highland league neighbours Lossiemouth FC manager Stevie Dunn revealed his club is aiming to use their United partners as a pathway for young local talent to progress to Highland League football.

In March 2014 it was confirmed that Lossiemouth United would be coming out of abeyance from 1 April 2014. United will be returning to compete in the North Region Junior Football Association First Division (West) league beginning season 2014–15. John Ross will be the team manager and Alan Jamieson slots in as his assistant. Lossiemouth United again ceased operations in December 2015.

In April 2022, the club announced they had submitted an application to return to the North Region, now within the Scottish senior football pyramid for the 2022–23 season.

In January 2023 Lossiemouth United announced the appointment of Scott Campbell as their manager. Arguably Scott is possibly the youngest north region manager to be appointed. This replicates what the club have been doing on the park investing heavily in youth and the club and committee.

== Honours ==
- North Region Championship winners: 2024–25
- North Region Division Two winners: 2007–08
- North Region (North) League winners: 1991–92, 1994–95
- Morayshire Junior League winners: 1949–50, 1952–53, 1955–56, 1958–59 (original club)
- Gordon Williamson Trophy: 1955–56 (original club), 1960–61, 1972–73, 1976–77
- Morayshire Junior Cup: 1958–59 (original club), 1989–90, 1993–94
- Matthew Cup: 1951–52, 1954–55, 1957–58 (original club), 1989–90, 1996–97
- Nicholson Cup: 1949–50, 1950–51, 1955–56 (original club), 1968–69, 1973–74, 1991–92
- Robbie Nicol Cup: 1981–82, 1982–83, 1994–95
- Robertson Cup: 1949–50 (original club), 1991–92, 1994–95
- Stewart Memorial Cup: 1957–58 (original club), 1960–61, 1997–98
- North of Scotland (Morayshire) Cup: 1950–51 (original club)
- Connon Cup: 1949–50 (original club), 1965–66, 1968–69, 1980–81, 1988–89, 1989–90
- White Horse Cup: 1953–54, 1955–56
