= Glenrothes F.C. =

Association football club in Scotland

Glenrothes
- Full name: Glenrothes Football Club
- Nickname: The Glens
- Founded: 1964
- Ground: Warout Stadium, Warout Road, Glenrothes
- Capacity: 5,000 (730 seated)
- Coordinates: 56°11′24″N 3°10′8″W
- Manager: Paul Beveridge
- League: East of Scotland League First Division
- 2025–26: East of Scotland League Premier Division, 15th of 16 (relegated)
- Website: http://www.clubwebsite.co.uk/glenrothesjuniorsfc/
Home colours	Away colours

Glenrothes Football Club is a Scottish football club based in the new town of Glenrothes, Fife. The club play home games at Warout Stadium, and currently compete in the East of Scotland League First Division, having moved from the junior leagues in 2019. Their strip colours are red with white trim.

== History ==
Formed in May 1964 with assistance from the Glenrothes Development Corporation, the "Glens" played their first game against near neighbours Thornton Hibs in August the same year at their original Dovecot Park ground. A crowd of 5,400 attended a Scottish Junior Cup quarter-final tie against Shotts Bon Accord here during Glenrothes' run to the final in 1968.

The club moved to the purpose-built Warout Stadium in 1971, one of the larger grounds in junior football, with room for around 5,000 spectators, 730 of whom can be seated. The record attendance for this ground is 5,600 against Cambuslang Rangers in another Junior Cup quarter-final tie in 1974.

Glenrothes' greatest success as a club came in 1975 when they won the Scottish Junior Cup, defeating Rutherglen Glencairn 1–0, in front of a crowd of 17,776 at Hampden Park. Glens had also been runners-up in 1968, losing after a replay to Johnstone Burgh with a combined attendance of 50,000 over the two ties, an impressive achievement given that they had only been formed a mere four years beforehand.

The club were members of the Fife Junior League, before competing in the East Region of which they, along with all Fife junior clubs became a part of in 2002. They were relegated from the East Super League (the top division in their region) in season 2005–06, but they immediately returned after clinching the 2006–07 Premier League title and remained in the top tier for three seasons.

In March 2019, Glenrothes announced they had applied for membership of the East of Scotland Football League beginning in the 2019–20 season, and were later accepted into the league. As part of the club's move to senior football, its name was changed to reflect this, by dropping the term "Junior".

== Current squad ==
Note: Flags indicate national team as defined under FIFA eligibility rules; some limited exceptions apply. Players may hold more than one non-FIFA nationality.

No.	Pos.	Nation	Player
TBC	GK	SCO	Scott Kyles
—	DF	SCO	Ryan Hughes
—	DF	SCO	Darren Somerville
—	DF	SCO	Arron Wilson
—	DF	SCO	Lewis Kerwin
—	MF	SCO	Stuart Cargill
—	MF	SCO	Ian McManus
—	MF	SCO	Lea Schiavone (Captain)

No.	Pos.	Nation	Player
—	MF	SCO	Michael Beagley
—	MF	SCO	Robbie Hodge
—	FW	SCO	Thomas Hampson
—	MF	SCO	Robbie Dyce
—	MF	SCO	Jack Carr
—	FW	SCO	Jack Brown
—	MF	SCO	Michael Ness

== Honours ==
Scottish Junior Cup

- Winners: 1974–75
- Runners-up: 1967–68

SJFA East Region Premier League

- Champions: 2006–07

=== Other Honours ===
- Fife & Lothians Cup: 1971–72
- Fife Junior League winners: 1965–66, 1966–67, 1967–68, 1969–70, 1970–71, 1974–75, 1975–76, 1977–78, 1983–84, 1984–85
- Fife Junior (PSM) Cup: 1967–68, 1970–71, 1971–72, 1972–73, 1975–76, 1976–77, 1978–79, 1985–86, 1997–98, 1999–00, 2000–01, 2003–04
- Fife & Tayside Cup: 2008–09
- Cowdenbeath (Interbrew) Cup: 1969–70, 1971–72, 1972–73, 1973–74, 1976–77, 1977–78, 1983–84
- Kingdom Kegs Cup: 1996–97, 1998–99, 2001–02, 2003–04, 2007–08
- Laidlaw Shield winners: 1981–82, 1982–83
- ACA sports League Cup: 2009–10
- Scottish record holders for best goal difference in a season, + 133 (32 games), 1969-70 Fife Region Junior League
