= Ballingry Rovers F.C. =

Former association football club in Scotland

Ballingry Rovers
- Full name: Ballingry Rovers Football Club
- Nickname(s): Rovers
- Founded: 1952
- Dissolved: 2014
- Ground: Ore Park; Clune Terrace; Glencraig, Fife
- League: SJFA East Region Superleague (until November 2014)
- 2013–14: 13th
- Website: http://www.ballingryroversfc.co.uk/
Home colours

Ballingry Rovers Football Club were a Scottish junior football club based in Glencraig, Fife.

== History ==
The club was founded in 1952 by Mr Andrew and Mrs Janet Clark of Ballingry Road with the aid of Jean Coron, originally playing at the King George VI Park in Crosshill. A successful amateur side for many years, the club stepped up to the junior grade in 2004. Their record in ten years of junior football was P 396, W 171, D 69, L 156, F 780, A 725.

The SJFA restructured prior to the 2006–07 season, and Rovers found themselves in the twelve-team East Region, Central Division. They finished third in their first season in the division and won the championship the following campaign.

The team were managed between October 2014 and their demise by former Aberdeen defender Willie Garner.

They were wound up in 2014 following profligate spending.

== Colours ==
The club originally wore red and white stripes. In the 1980s it wore red, and in the 1990s yellow shirts and red shorts. Its final colours were orange shirts and black shorts.

== Ground ==
The club played at Ore Park, off Clune Terrace.

== Honours ==
=== SJFA East Region Central Division ===
- Winner: 2007–08
