= Musselburgh Athletic F.C. =

Association football club in Scotland

Musselburgh Athletic
- Full name: Musselburgh Athletic Football Club
- Nickname: The Burgh
- Founded: 1934
- Ground: Olivebank Arena; Market Street; Musselburgh
- Capacity: 1,200
- Coordinates: 55.9418°N 3.0648°W
- President: Kevin Liston
- Manager: Wayne Sproule & Craig Stevenson
- League: Lowland League East
- 2025–26: East of Scotland League Premier Division, 2nd of 16 (promoted)
- Website: https://www.musselburghathletic.co.uk/
Home colours	Away colours

Musselburgh Athletic Football Club are a Scottish football club based in the town of Musselburgh, East Lothian. Officially formed in 1934, they have played under different names prior to this year including Musselburgh Comrades, Musselburgh Bruntonians, Musselburgh Juniors and Musselburgh Fern since 1898.

Nicknamed "the Burgh" or "Mussy", they play their home games at the Olivebank Arena in the Fisherrow area of the town. Olivebank was opened as a football ground on 2 August 1910 when a crowd of 2,000 supporters saw Scottish Junior Cup holders, Ashfield, record a 2-1 win over the Burgh that afternoon.

Musselburgh Athletic's home colours are blue and white which are traditionally the town's colours, with the anchor representing its history for fishing.

== History ==
The majority of the club's history has been played in the Scottish Junior football leagues. In seasons 2010–11 and 2014–15 they reached the final of the Scottish Junior Cup, on both occasions losing 2–1 to Ayrshire team Auchinleck Talbot.

The team currently plays in the Lowland League East, having moved from the SJFA East Region Premier League in 2018 following the formation of a Scottish Football Pyramid.

In 2019, Musselburgh won the South & East of Scotland Cup-Winners Shield which allowed them to take part in the Scottish Cup for the first time in 2020–21. They also obtained their SFA License at this time due to several improvements made to the clubs facilities to comply with SFA licensing criteria, this included the installation of floodlights.

On 30 October 2023, a Scottish Cup tie against three-time winners Clyde took place 'under the lights' at the Olivebank Arena. The game was broadcast live on television by BBC Scotland - the first and only time this has happened at the Arena. Clyde won the game 3–2 after extra time.

== Scottish Junior Football Association (1889 - 2018) ==
The history of Musselburgh Athletic in the 'Honest Toun' can be traced as far back as 1889 due to its links to earlier clubs such as Musselburgh Fern, Musselburgh Juniors and Musselburgh Bruntonians. However, the official foundation of Musselburgh Athletic was in 1934.

The club played at various levels throughout its time in the Junior Leagues and played in three Scottish Junior Cup finals whilst there. In May 1923 at Tynecastle Park, Musselburgh Bruntonians won the Junior Scottish Cup defeating Arniston Rangers 3-0, in front of approximately 20,000 spectators.

In more recent times, the club reached the Scottish Junior Cup final twice in 2011 and 2015. Musselburgh lost both finals to Ayrshire club Auchinleck Talbot, 2-1. Both games were played on neutral territory at Rugby Park, home of Kilmarnock F.C.

The club made the decision to leave the SJFA and make the move to the East of Scotland Football League in 2018, partly inspired by the success of former Junior club, Kelty Hearts. Prior to this change there was a restructure of the club's committee due to deep-seated concerns among supporters regarding its direction and financial management.

Following an Extraordinary General Meeting, long serving chairman Charlie McGlynn stepped down. He was replaced by interim chairman Karl Cleghorn, who would lead the club's recovery. Under his leadership they transitioned to a sustainable, community-supported model, paving the way for its future success in the East of Scotland Football League.

== East of Scotland Football League (2018-2026) ==
Before the start of the 2018-19 season, a host of Junior clubs, including Musselburgh, moved across to the East of Scotland Football League to join the recently established Scottish Football Pyramid. This presented clubs the opportunity to potentially gain promotion to the SPFL creating an increase from 13 teams to 39. The clubs who made the move would subsequently be split into three parallel conferences.

Musselburgh finished 3rd in the 2018–19 season as part of 'Conference A' under the management of Calvin Shand until January 2019, and then Kevin McDonald for the duration of the campaign. As a result, the club qualified for the newly established East of Scotland Premier League for the 2019-20 season, one tier below the Lowland Football League. They also got to the East of Scotland League Cup final, but lost 1-0 to Bo'ness United at Montgomery Park.

Due to the outbreak of the global COVID-19 pandemic, the 2019–20 season was suspended in March 2020 and then curtailed in April with a 'points per game' system adopted. This resulted in a 10th place finish for the Burgh. In 2020–21, the season was delayed until October with matches played behind closed doors and by January, the season was suspended. A vote was taken a few months later and in April the season was declared 'null and void', with Musselburgh in 4th place.

At the start of the 2021–22 season Kevin Milne was appointed to replace the outgoing Kevin McDonald who joined the Kelty Hearts coaching staff. However, Milne quickly departed the club. Musselburgh then appointed Joe Hamill as manager from East Lothian rivals, Haddington Athletic. The Burgh would finish in 8th place following a disappointing second half of the season and Hamill would resign the following September following a Scottish Cup defeat to Newtongrange Star.

Liam Burns took the reins for the 2022–23 season, and at 27 years old became the youngest manager in the clubs history. He went on to steer the team to a 3rd place finish in the East of Scotland Premier League. In the following campaign 2023–24, the Burgh would take one step further with a 2nd place finish behind eventual champions, Broxburn Athletic.

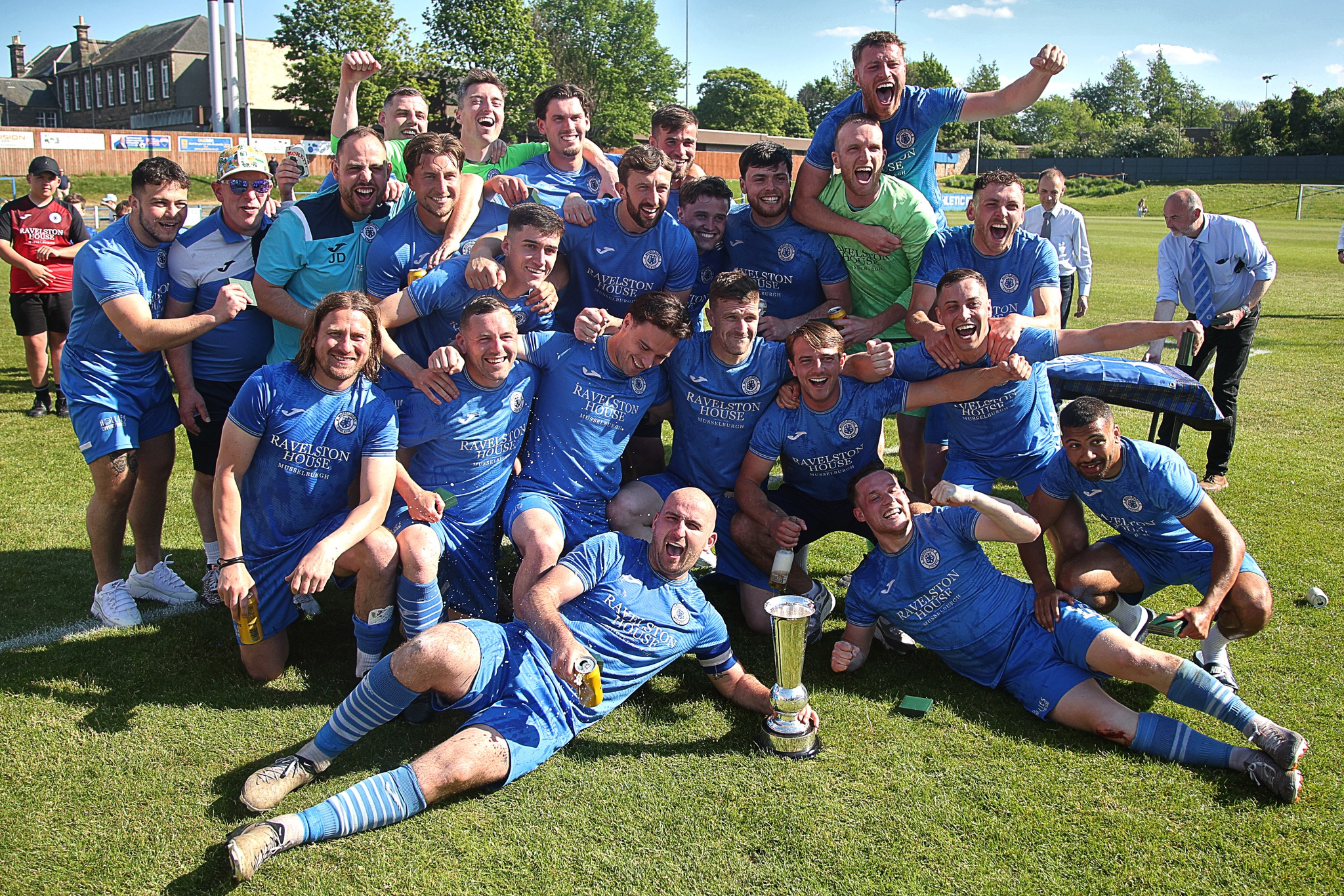
Musselburgh players celebrate with EoS Premier League trophy in 2025

It would be third time lucky under Burns as Musselburgh won the 2024–25 East of Scotland Premier League. They were crowned champions following a 4-0 away win at Sauchie Juniors in the penultimate game of the season, with all four goals being scored by forward Jordan Smith.

Musselburgh would go on to complete the East of Scotland double by winning the League Cup. They defeated Kirkcaldy & Dysart 2-0 in the final at St. Albans Park, with Jordan Smith scoring both goals.

In between these two successes, the club earned an opportunity at promotion to the Lowland League in a two-legged play-off against West of Scotland Football League champions, Clydebank. Musselburgh fell short losing the tie 3-1 on aggregate remaining in the East of Scotland Premier League.

At the start of the 2025–26 season, it was confirmed there would be at least two automatic promotion places available to the Lowland League. The top two teams would gain entry to the newly established Lowland League East following regionalisation of the fifth tier for the 2026-27 season.

Musselburgh endured a challenging campaign with mixed results, which resulted in the departure of Liam Burns with only a handful of fixtures remaining. Assistant manager Wayne Sproule and defender Craig Stevenson were appointed joint managers after they steered the club to an upturn in results. Musselburgh went on to secure automatic promotion at Olivebank with a 2nd place finish by defeating newly crowned champions Hill of Beath Hawthorn 1-0, on the final day of the season.

== Lowland Football League East (2026-present) ==
Following promotion from the East of Scotland Football League, Musselburgh would play in the fifth tier of Scottish Football for the first time in their history for the 2026–27 season. Their first fixture was a home match against former SPFL side Bonnyrigg Rose which they lost 3-0. One week later Musselburgh would pick up their first win in the Lowland League East away to Dunipace, 3-1. Their first ever goal at this level was scored by player/manager, Craig Stevenson.

== Scottish Cup (2020-present) ==
Following improvements to the club's facilities at the Olivebank Arena resulting in the reward of an SFA license, whilst also winning the South & East of Scotland Cup-Winners Shield in 2019, Musselburgh were eligible to participate in the Scottish Cup for the first time in the 2020–21 season.

On 28 November 2020 in the 1st Preliminary Round, Musselburgh won their first ever Scottish Cup tie 3-2 away to Penicuik Athletic after extra time. The club's first ever Scottish Cup goal was scored early on by Michael Moffat.

In the 2023–24 Scottish Cup, the Burgh defeated Coldstream 6-0 followed by a victory over Lowland League side Gretna F.C. 2008 on penalties, which set up a 2nd Round tie at home to three-time Scottish Cup winners, Clyde. The match was broadcast live on BBC Scotland to a sell out crowd, with Clyde running out 3-2 winners after extra-time.

Musselburgh's furthest run in their short history in the competition came during 2024–25 Scottish Cup when they reached the fourth round. Along the way, they defeated Penicuik Athletic, Darvel, Caledonian Braves and Bo'ness United, before eventually losing to Scottish Championship side Hamilton Academical 3-1 at New Douglas Park.

In the 2025–26 competition Musselburgh defeated Vale of Leithen and Bonnyton Thistle before being drawn at home to SPFL League Two team, Forfar Athletic, in the second round. Despite holding their own during the 90-minutes, the Burgh would go down to a late free-kick as Forfar won 2-1.

== Rivalries ==
Musselburgh Athletic competes in several local derbies across both its current county of East Lothian, and football clubs of its previous county, Midlothian. These fixtures include Tranent, Haddington Athletic, Dunbar United and Preston Athletic from East Lothian and Newtongrange Star, Bonnyrigg Rose and Penicuik Athletic from Midlothian.

== The 1934 Club ==
'The 1934 Club' is the official Musselburgh Athletic supporters club with the name being used based on the year of the clubs official foundation. It was established in 2016 and regularly sees supporters buses leave the town to back their team across the country. They also hold numerous charitable events and fundraisers throughout the year.

== Current squad ==
As of 27 June 2026

Note: Flags indicate national team as defined under FIFA eligibility rules; some limited exceptions apply. Players may hold more than one non-FIFA nationality.

No.	Pos.	Nation	Player
1	GK	SCO	Daniel Laing
2	DF	SCO	Craig Stevenson
3	DF	SCO	Callum Donaldson
4	DF	ENG	Jake Hutchings
5	DF	SCO	Robert Wilson (captain)
6	DF	SCO	Taylor Black
7	FW	SCO	Nathan Evans
8	MF	SCO	Oban Anderson
9	FW	SCO	Jonathan Court
10	FW	SCO	Liam Buchanan
11	FW	SCO	Sean Brown
—	DF	SCO	Kerr Steel

No.	Pos.	Nation	Player
12	FW	SCO	Given Ndlovu
14	DF	SCO	Owen Hastie
15	DF	SCO	Jamie Todd ((Vice-Captain))
16	MF	SCO	Gabriele Auriemma
17	MF	SCO	Jackson Barker
18	MF	SCO	Zachary Khan
19	MF	SCO	Rhys Caves
20	FW	SCO	Aiden Walsh
21	GK	SCO	Alistair Middleton
22	MF	SCO	Ryan Porteous (On-loan from Bonnyrigg Rose Athletic)
25	DF	SCO	Matthew O'Connor
27	DF	SCO	Ben Stirling
—	GK	SCO	Paul Grant
—	MF	SCO	Max Black

=== Coaching Staff ===
Position	Staff
Joint Manager	(Scotland) Wayne Sproule
Joint Manager	(Scotland) Craig Stevenson
First Team Coach	(Scotland) Kris Renton
First Team Coach	(Scotland) John Robertson
Goalkeeping Coach	(Scotland) Jordan Dunsmore

== Managers ==
Information only available post COVID-19 pandemic following the curtailed 'points per game' and 'null and void' seasons. Per official club website.

Key

- M = matches played; W = matches won; D = matches drawn; L = matches lost; Win % = percentage of total matches won

Name (s)	From	To	M	W	D	L	Win %
(Scotland) Kevin Milne	12/06/2021	21/07/2021	2	1	1	0	50.00
(Scotland) Joe Hamill	22/07/2021	18/09/2022	49	19	11	19	38.77
(Scotland) Liam Burns	23/09/2022	15/04/2026	158	103	20	35	65.18
(Scotland) Wayne Sproule & (Scotland) Craig Stevenson	05/05/2026	Present	24	9	7	8	37.50

- Wayne and Craig were caretaker managers from 18/04/26 before being officially appointed on 05/05/26.
- As of 21/11/2026

== Appearances ==
Players who have made more than 200 appearances for the club per official website.

Player	Appearances
(Scotland) Mathu King	394
(Scotland) Jackie Myles	347
(Scotland) Nathan Evans	235
(Scotland) Conor Thomson	231
(Scotland) Declan O'Kane	225

- As of 21/11/2026

== Centurion Goalscorers ==
Players who have scored more than 100 goals for the club per official website.

Player	Goals
(Scotland) Mathu King	227
(Scotland) Nathan Evans	112
(Scotland) Jordan Smith	105

- As of 21/11/2026

== Honours ==
=== Major Honours ===
East of Scotland Football League Premier Division

- Winners: 2024–25
- Runners-up (2): 2023–24, 2025-26

East of Scotland Football League League Cup

- Winners: 2024–25
- Runners-up: 2018–19

Scottish Junior Cup

- Winners: 1922–23 (as Musselburgh Bruntonians)
- Runners-up (2): 2010–11, 2014–15

Scottish Junior East Region Premier League (Tier 2)

- Winners (2): 2008–09, 2017–18

=== Other Honours ===
- South & East of Scotland Cup-Winners Shield: 2019–20
- Alex Jack Cup: 2019–20
- East Region League Division 1 Championship: 1970–71
- East Region League Division 2 Championship: 2000–01
- Dalmeny Cup: 1908–09, 1911–12
- East Lothian Cup: 1911–12
- Simpson Shield: 1911–12, 1914–15
- Marshall Cup: 1914–15
- Musselburgh Cup: 1935–36
- East of Scotland Cup: 1936–37
- St Michael Cup: 1936–37, 1937–38, 1966–67, 2007–08, 2008–09
- Thistle Cup: 1972–73
- Brown Cup: 2003–04, 2007–08, 2008–09
- Lothian League Cup: 2005–06
- East of Scotland Development League (Under 20's) 2024-25

== Gallery ==
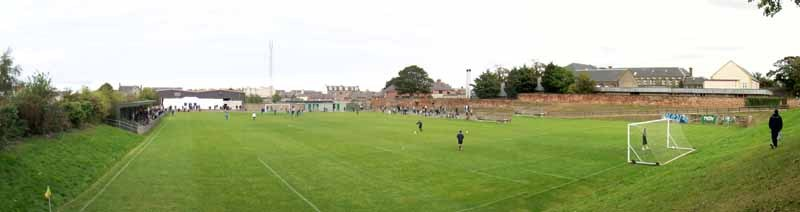
A panoramic view of Olivebank Stadium
