= Penicuik Athletic F.C. =

Association football club in Scotland

Penicuik Athletic
- Full name: Penicuik Athletic Football
- Nicknames: Cuikie; Rookie Cookie
- Founded: 1888
- Ground: Montgomery Park; Carlops Road, Penicuik
- Capacity: 2,000
- Coordinates: 55°49′49″N 3°13′32″W
- Chairman: Andy Penman
- Manager: Ryan Harding
- League: East of Scotland League Premier Division
- 2025–25: East of Scotland League Premier Division, 9th of 16
- Website: www.penicuikathleticfc.co.uk
Home colours	Away colours

Penicuik Athletic Football Club are a Scottish football club. They were formed in 1888 and are based at Montgomery Park (formerly known as Penicuik Park), in the town of Penicuik. The team plays in the East of Scotland Football League Premier Division, having moved from the junior leagues in 2018.

== History ==
=== The beginning ===
Penicuik turned Junior in 1951 with the supporters club buying Eastfield Park from the National Coal Board and building a new pavilion. The new ground was opened with a match against a strong Hibernian side which the Athletic lost 5–0.

The chairmen at the time, David Masson and Jimmy Ketchen, were two prominent figures in the club. Their manager was Dick Walker and coach Harry Verth.

Penicuik won their first silverware in 1949–50 season (before turning Junior), lifting the Border Cup.

In 1966, the Athletic reached the semi-final of the Scottish Junior Cup, only to lose by the narrowest of margins to local rivals Bonnyrigg Rose.

=== Scottish Junior Cup Final Run 1969–70 ===
Penicuik Athletic's biggest achievement is reaching the Scottish Junior Cup Final in 1970 at Hampden Park. Penicuik's opponents on 16 May 1970 was Blantyre Victoria, who they drew with 1–1, only to be defeated in the replay the following Tuesday night 1–0. The crowd at the final was in excess of 30,000, with the replay attendance published at 14,225.

=== Abeyance ===
The 1970s saw probably the most successful period in the club's history when a social club was built at the ground. Many local trophies were won and the team was considered as one of the leading teams in the East of Scotland.

The club's fortunes fell into decline both on and off the park in the 1980s and the social club was forced to close in 1986 with mounting debts. The park had been used as security for various loans and the creditors put the park up for sale to clear the debts. The team continued to play despite the off-field problems and were showing signs of revival when a near fatal blow was delivered as the ground was sold on to be developed into a supermarket which stands on Eastfield Park today.

Throughout the 1990s several initiatives were embarked on to secure a new pitch but for a variety of reasons were unsuccessful. The last and ultimately successful project to establish a pitch which met the criteria laid down by the Scottish Junior Football Association grew out of an initiative by three local Midlothian Councillors―Russell Imrie, David Fletcher and Adam Montgomery―to improve recreational facilities in Penicuik.

=== Return to playing and the Willie McGinley years ===
Penicuik reformed in 2002, playing at their new home Penicuik Park in the centre of the town.

Penicuik decided to set up a competition to design a club crest which would be on the football strip and letterheads. In order to involve the local community, four local primary schools were invited to submit designs to the club. The schools involved were Sacred Heart, Cornbank, Mauricewood and Cuikin Primary schools. There were over 100 entries to the competition and the winning design was submitted by Scott Anderson.

Penicuik Athletic were accepted back into the re-organised East Region (with the introduction of the Super League) and took their place in the second division in season 2002–03. The long-awaited first game was played at Armadale in the first round of the League Cup on 6 August 2002, resulting in a 5–1 defeat. Over 500 spectators turned up at the new pitch in Penicuik Park on Saturday 8 August to witness a no scoring draw in a league match against Harthill Royal. Re-entry into the Scottish Junior Cup saw a win against Blackburn before defeat in the next round against an experienced Renfrew Juniors. Penicuik just missed out by a point on promotion to the first division after a 1–0 defeat in their final league match against West Calder which was controversially switched to be played on a Thursday night.

The following season saw promotion again narrowly missed with another third-placed finish. However, the club won its first trophy, the Supplementary Cup when a late Brian Hancock goal secured victory over Whitburn in the final played at Blackburn United's Murrayfield Park. The manager that night was Willie McGinley and of the team below only Billy Bald remains at the club. Paul Lindsay and Brian Hancock scored in the 2–1 win.

Further success was to follow for McGinley's side as they won the Lothians League Division Two title in 2004–05 with 41 points from 18 games played. As a result, Penicuik Athletic were awarded Midlothian Council's Senior Team Award in their annual Greatest Achievement in Sport awards. The following season they finished second in Division One and gained a place in the new East Premier League. Penicuik were also beaten finalists in the pre-season League Cup going down by the odd goal to Musselburgh Athletic.

The Athletic found the going tough in the new Premier League and narrowly escaped one of the three relegation slots back to the District League. They narrowly avoided relegation with a last match win over Scottish Junior Cup finalists Kelty Hearts at Penicuik Park, in front of a 500+ crowd. Penicuik lost in the final of the Brown Cup to Bonnyrigg Rose after defeating Scottish Junior Cup finalists Linlithgow Rose in an earlier round.

Penicuik improved their position in the Premier League by finishing in sixth place in the 12 team league during Season 2007–08. Irvine Meadow came to Penicuik in the first round of the Scottish Junior Cup and won by four goals to three while the club did not progress beyond the third round stage in any of the local cup competitions. At the end of the season, Willie McGinlay who had been team manager since the team started playing again in 2002, stood down for business and personal reasons.

=== Stuart 'Snowy' McKean takes charge ===
Manager McGinley stood down after six-years in charge in May 2008 and was replaced by his assistant Stuart 'Snowy' McKean, who had a distinguished junior playing career with Armadale Thistle and Bonnyrigg Rose. Season 2008–09 saw a further improvement in the league position with Penicuik finishing in fourth place. Penicuik's best performance in the local cup competitions was reaching the semi-final of the St. Michael's Cup only to lose out at home to Linlithgow Rose in a penalty shoot out. However the following season, Penicuik started poorly. Failure to qualify from the sectional league cup was followed by a first round knock out in the Scottish Junior cup. A run of only one win in seven league matches before an enforced break for bad weather saw Penicuik drop into second bottom spot in the Premier League. McKean resigned in December 2009 and was replaced by the duo of the then club captain Craig Meikle, and former player Brian Ryrie.

=== The Meikle/Ryrie years ===
Former player Brian Ryrie and current player Craig Meikle were chosen from a strong list of applicants to replace McKean. Despite losing their first match in charge, sufficient points were gained from the remaining league fixtures to claim seventh spot in the league, finishing clear of the three relegation spots. There were second round exits in both the East of Scotland and Fife & Lothians Cup. The St. Michael's and Brown Cups went uncontested because of the length of the break for the bad weather.

Their first full season in charge saw several changes made to the playing squad and the league position showed an improvement with fifth place being achieved. A missed penalty in the last minute, when the scores were level, proved costly in the first round Scottish Junior cup tie at Kilwinning as the home replay was lost. Penicuik did not progress from their league cup section but enjoyed good runs to the semi-finals of both the East of Scotland and Fife and Lothians Cup, losing to Newtongrange Star and Bo'ness United respectively.

Promotion to the Super League was the target for season 2011–12 and it went right down to the wire. Penicuik went into their last league game of the season at Broxburn Athletic needing a win to gain the second promotion spot but lost out to the home side who were promoted in their place. Penicuik finished fourth in a very tight finish. Broxburn were also Penicuik's downfall in the League Cup where Penicuik topped the section but were pipped by Broxburn who successfully appealed against Livingston fielding an ineligible player in their tie, and as a result progressed to the knock out stages. Early exits were suffered in both the East of Scotland and Fife and Lothians Cup. After first and second round Scottish Junior Cup wins against Glenrothes and Glasgow Perthshire, eventual runners-up and Junior giants, Auchinleck Talbot proved too strong in the third round, handing out a six-goal defeat at Auchinleck.

Season 2012–13 was a stop-start one, with Penicuik only having played nine competitive games, following the pre-season League Cup, due to weather and the postponement of their Junior Cup tie against Kelty Hearts, by January. Promotion went to the last day of the season again with Penicuik in a three-way battle with Bathgate Thistle and Armadale Thistle. Despite Penicuik winning 2–0 against Broughty, Armadale were promoted after their victory at the same time. Penicuik's Scottish Junior Cup run consisted of four games, a 4–4 draw at Dunbar United and a 3–1 win at Penicuik in the first round, a 3–0 victory away to Girvan before finally crashing out in the third round to Kelty Hearts 2–1 in a match held at Oakley's Blairwood Park due to drainage problems at Kelty's ground. Penicuik didn't fare well in the other cup competitions, losing 5–3 to Newburgh in the Fife and Lothians and losing 5–2 to Ballingry Rovers in the East of Scotland second round following a 3–1 win against Forfar West End in the first round.

Co-manager Bryan Ryrie resigned from his position at the end of the season.

Penicuik's season 2013–14 was a successful one, with promotion clinched with a 1–0 away win against Livingston United in May, and the Premier League Championship following later that month with a 2–1 home win against runners-up Fauldhouse United thanks to goals from captain Dougie Cunnison and long-serving midfielder Ryan Gay.

The first season in the Super League saw Penicuik finish an impressive sixth, while also reaching the quarter-finals of the Scottish Junior Cup for the first time since 1970, though they lost out 2–0 to eventual finalists Musselburgh Athletic.

Season 2015-16 ended in success, as Penicuik defeated new Super League Champions Bonnyrigg Rose 3–1 in the Fife and Lothians Cup Final in June at Olivebank Stadium, thanks to goals from Darrell Young, Ryan McCallum and Sean Patterson. They finished 9th in the Super League, and exited the Junior Cup with a 4–2 defeat to Lochee United in Round 3. Manager Craig Meikle resigned in June.

=== Johnny Harvey returns to Penicuik ===
Former player Johnny Harvey was appointed as the club's new manager at the beginning of July 2016, leaving his post as manager of Haddington Athletic. His first season in charge saw Penicuik finish fourth, their highest position in the top flight of Junior Football since the eighties. They progressed to the fifth round of the Scottish Junior Cup but were beaten 4–3 at home by Kirkintilloch Rob Roy. The summer of 2017 saw the departure of a number of players, including midfielder Ryan Gay, who had served the club for 11 seasons.

Harvey's second season in charge would again see the club record their highest finish, this time ending the season in 3rd place. However success was to come in the East of Scotland Cup, where the side would defeat the holders Tranent Juniors 2–0 in the final at Prestonfield thanks to goals from captain Craig Hume and Aaron Somerville.

=== Move to senior football ===
Penicuik was one of many eastern junior clubs that entered the East of Scotland Football League in 2018, having moved from the junior leagues.

The club would be placed into Conference A, with their first match back in Senior Football coming against former Junior opponents Sauchie, in the group stages of the East of Scotland League Cup, a 3–1 win for Penicuik thanks to an Aaron Somerville hat-trick. With the side sitting top of Conference A with a 100% record by mid-October, manager Johnny Harvey resigned from his role to move to SPFL League Two side Berwick Rangers, returning to sign three players from Penicuik weeks later - captain Craig Hume, vice-captain Lewis Barr and defender Andy Forbes.

He would be succeeded by his former assistant manager Kevin Milne, who would be joined as co-Manager by Tony Begg in December and the duo would lead Penicuik to the Conference A title and into the East of Scotland Championship Playoffs, finishing second to Midlothian rivals Bonnyrigg Rose in the three-way round robin, Broxburn Athletic the other side. In the following weeks, Penicuik were granted their SFA Licence, which brought with it participation in the Scottish Cup, commencing in season 2019–20.

The club took their place in the newly formed East of Scotland Premier Division for the 2019–20 season and returned to the Scottish Cup for the first time in over eighty years, winning back-to-back away Midlothian derbies in the preliminary rounds, against Easthouses Lily (6–1) and Whitehill Welfare (1–0).

== Current squad ==
As of 1 August 2026

Note: Flags indicate national team as defined under FIFA eligibility rules; some limited exceptions apply. Players may hold more than one non-FIFA nationality.

No.	Pos.	Nation	Player
1	GK	SCO	Neil Mitchell
2	DF	SCO	Max McGinley
3	DF	SCO	Danny Chisholm
4	DF	SCO	Jack Thomson
5	DF	SCO	Owen Walton
6	MF	SCO	Sam Coats
7	FW	SCO	Sean Stewart (captain)
8	MF	SCO	Joe Viola
9	FW	SCO	Daryl Healy
10	MF	SCO	Louis Signorini
11	FW	SCO	Niall Kemp
12	MF	SCO	Jamie Anderson

No.	Pos.	Nation	Player
14	MF	SCO	Tony Robertson
15	DF	SCO	Sam Neil
16	DF	SCO	Fletcher Patterson
17	MF	SCO	Jake Morrison
18	MF	SCO	Rory Jack
19	FW	SCO	Kadien Benham
20	MF	SCO	Niall Doherty
21	FW	SCO	Alfie McGill
24	GK	SCO	Rudi Clapperton
26	DF	SCO	Logan Johnstone
30	GK	SCO	Brandyn Bain

== Management ==
Position	Name
Manager	Ryan Harding
Coaches	Fraser Ogilvie, Joe Murray, Kevin Finlay
Goalkeeper Coach	David Livie
Sports First Aider	Lewis Mason
U20 Manager	Kieran Millar
U20 Coaches	Paul Laidlaw, Lewis Mason, Keith Thompson, Jamie MacNab, Finlay Smith
Womens Manager	Lee Zavaroni
Womens Coaches	Iain Manson, Dougie Penman, Lucy Langford

== Season-by-season record ==
=== Junior ===
Season	Division	Pos.	Pld.	W	D	L	GD	Pts	Scottish Junior Cup
Penicuik Athletic
2013–14	East Premier League	1st	30	20	4	6	36	64	Fifth Round, lost to Irvine Meadow
2014–15	East Super League	6th	28	11	7	10	-2	40	Quarter Final, lost to Musselburgh Athletic
2015–16	East Super League	9th	30	12	5	13	-9	41	Third Round, lost to Lochee United
2016–17	East Super League	4th	30	14	7	9	+18	49	Fifth Round, lost to Kirkintilloch Rob Roy
2017–18	East Super League	3rd	30	17	6	7	+24	57	Second Round, lost to Kilbirnie Ladeside

=== Senior ===
Season	Division	Tier	Pos.	Pld.	W	D	L	GD	Pts	Scottish Cup
Penicuik Athletic
2018–19	East of Scotland League Conference A	6	1st	24	20	3	1	+77	63	Did Not Participate
2019–20	East of Scotland Premier Division	6	8th†	18	8	3	7	+5	27	Third round, lost to Partick Thistle
2020–21	East of Scotland Premier Division	6	7th††	8	5	1	2	+10	16	Preliminary round 1, lost to Mussselburgh Athletic
2021–22	East of Scotland Premier Division	6	2nd	34	25	5	4	+38	80	First round, lost to Tranent Juniors
2022–23	East of Scotland Premier Division	6	6th	30	13	9	8	+14	48	First round, lost to Musselburgh Athletic
2023–24	East of Scotland Premier Division	6	11th	30	10	5	15	-15	35	First round, lost to Pollok
2024–25	East of Scotland Premier Division	6	11th	30	11	7	12	6	40	Preliminary round 2, lost to Musselburgh Athletic

† Season curtailed due to COVID-19 pandemic. †† Season declared Null & Void due to COVID-19 pandemic

== Honours ==
- East of Scotland Football League
  - Conference A winners: 2018-19
  - Overall runners-up: 2018-19
- Junior East Region Premier League
  - Winners: 2013–14
- Scottish Junior Cup
  - Runners-up: 1970

=== Other honours ===
- East Region Division One winners: 1978–79, 1980–81
- Fife & Lothians Cup winners: 1977, 1981, 2016
- East of Scotland Junior Cup winners: 1908–09, 1910–11, 2017–18
- Lothian League Division 2 winners: 2004–05
- Lothian League Supplementary Cup winners: 2003–04
- East of Scotland Consolation Cup winners: 1893–94, 1895–96
- Marshall Cup winners: 1912–13

== Recent seasons ==
Season	League	Position	Matches Played	Points
2002–03	Lothian League Division 2	3rd	20	37
2003–04	Lothian League Division 2	3rd	18	32
2004–05	Lothian League Division 2	1st	18	41
2005–06	Lothian League Division 1	2nd	18	35
2006–07	East Premier League	9th	22	27
2007–08	East Premier League	6th	22	33
2008–09	East Premier League	4th	22	35
2009–10	East Premier League	7th	22	28
2010–11	East Premier League	5th	22	32
2011–12	East Premier League	4th	22	37
2012–13	East Premier League	5th	22	37
2013–14	East Premier League	1st	30	64
2014–15	East Super League	6th	28	40
2015–16	East Super League	9th	30	41
2016–17	East Super League	4th	30	49
2017–18	East Super League	3rd	30	57
2018–19	East of Scotland League Conference A	1st	24	63
2019–20	East of Scotland League Premier Division	7th*	18	27
2020–21	East of Scotland League Premier Division	7th*	8	16
2021–22	East of Scotland League Premier Division	2nd	34	80

- Season 2019–20 was ended early due to COVID-19 pandemic, decided on a Points-Per-Game basis, meaning Penicuik finished in 8th place. Season 2020–21 was declared null and void.

== Managerial history ==
Since reformation in 2002

- (Scotland) Willie McGinley (2002 – May 2008)
- (Scotland) Stuart McKean (May 2008 – December 2009)
- (Scotland) Craig Meikle & Bryan Ryrie (December 2009 – June 2013)
- (Scotland) Craig Meikle (June 2013 – June 2016)
- (Scotland) Johnny Harvey (July 2016 – October 2018)
- (Scotland) Kevin Milne (November 2018 – December 2018)
- (Scotland) Kevin Milne & Tony Begg (December 2018 – February 2020)
- (Scotland) Tony Begg (February 2020 – July 2021)
- (Scotland) Stevie McLeish (August 2021 – February 2023)
- (Scotland) Calum Elliot (March 2023 – April 2023)
- (Scotland) David Hannah (May 2023 – July 2023)
- (Scotland) Lewis Coult (July 2023 – August 2024)
- (Scotland) Gavin Burrell & David Simmonds (September 2024 -– April 2025)
- (Scotland) Ryan Harding (May 2025 – )

== Notable former players ==
- Jock Paterson, who made 283 appearances for Hibs and 33 for Ayr United.
- Eddie Thomson, who played for Hearts and Aberdeen, and also managed Australia in the 1990s.
- Malcolm Robertson, part of the 1969–70 team who went on to play for Hearts, Raith Rovers, Ayr United, Toronto Blizzard, Dundee United, Hibs and Ħamrun Spartans.
- Murray McDermott, part of the 1969–70 team who had been at Rangers and went on to play for Raith Rovers, Berwick Rangers, Morton, Arbroath, Meadowbank Thistle, Partick Thistle and Hearts.
- Lee Bullen, played for teams in China, and latterly Dunfermline, Sheffield Wednesday and Falkirk.
- Kevin Twaddle, who played for Hearts and Motherwell, amongst other Scottish clubs, played for Athletic during the 2005–06 season.
- Roddy Georgeson, who played senior at Port Vale, Dundee, Raith Rovers, Berwick Rangers, Dunfermline, Montrose and Meadowbank Thistle, latterly junior at Arniston, Penicuik and Haddington.
- Andrew Seaton, Capped by Scotland at U21 level, played for Alloa Athletic, Bristol Rovers and Falkirk.
- Martin Cameron, who played for Alloa Athletic, Bristol Rovers, Partick Thistle, St Mirren, Gretna, Shamrock Rovers and Forfar Athletic.
- Brad McKay, currently at Brechin City, part of Hearts' 2014–15 SPFL Championship winning squad, spent season 2010–11 on loan at Penicuik.
