= Lochgelly Albert F.C. =

Association football club in Lochgelly, Fife, Scotland

Lochgelly Albert
- Full name: Lochgelly Albert Junior Football Club
- Founded: 1926
- Ground: Purvis Park, South Street, Lochgelly
- Capacity: 3,200
- Coordinates: 56°7′22″N 3°18′20″W
- Chairman: Jock Kinnnell
- Manager: Stephen Batty
- League: East of Scotland League First Division
- 2025–26: East of Scotland League Second Division, 6th of 15 (promoted)
- Website: http://www.lochgellyalbertjfc.com/
Home colours	Away colours

Lochgelly Albert Football Club is a Scottish football club based in Lochgelly, Fife. Their home ground is Purvis Park and they currently compete in the East of Scotland League First Division. Club colours are black and amber.

Founded in 1926 as an amateur side, the club stepped up to the Junior grade in 1933. In May 2020, the club confirmed they had successfully applied to join the East of Scotland Football League within the senior pyramid.

== History ==
There are a couple of theories of how Lochgelly Albert started the use of 'Albert', the first being that the club was named after Queen Victoria's husband, Prince Albert, adherents pointing to the fact that the original team colours of gold and black are the same as the Royal Livery at the time of Prince Albert's death in 1861. However, the length of time between Prince Albert's death and the setting up of the amateur club in 1926 makes this unlikely. The second theory is that the club took its name from the French town Albert, near the 1916 Somme battlefields. It is well known that more than a few young men from Lochgelly not only fought, but perished during the battle. It is reported that most of the soldiers were at some time stationed in Albert and a few not only played football before the war, but after hostilities had ceased, set about founding a local team in Lochgelly. This may have been done to try to replace the local senior team Lochgelly United who disbanded for the duration of the war.

Lochgelly Albert's first football game within the Junior ranks was on 29 July 1933, away to Kirkford Juniors at Beathview Park, Cowdenbeath and resulted in a 1–0 victory to Lochgelly Albert. The goal was scored by Pat Finnerty. The club's first trophy arrived in the season 1934–35. This was the Fife Cup and the Albert were victorious over Rosslyn Juniors at Stark's Park, Kirkcaldy, the current home of Raith Rovers, the final score being 2–0 to Lochgelly Albert.

The Albert were followed into the Junior ranks in 1935 by another team called Lochgelly Violet, and their first game on 29 July 1935 was away to Lochgelly Albert at Gardiner's Park. The outcome of this game was a 2–0 victory for the Albert and was watched by 2,000 local spectators.

The SJFA restructured prior to the 2006–07 season and Albert found themselves in the 12-team East Region Central Division, where they finished fourth in their first season in the division. The club remained in the East Region's bottom tier, with a best finish of third in 2008–09, until their move to the East of Scotland League in 2020.

== Record attendance ==
The record crowd for Lochgelly Albert (and for any Junior ground in the Fife region) was 11,645 for a Scottish Junior Cup sixth round tie against Bo'ness United on 13 March 1948.

== Honours ==
- East of Scotland League Third Division winners: 2024–25
- Fife Junior League winners: 1937–38, 1946–47, 1948–49, 1954–55, 1973–74
- Fife Junior Cup: 1934–35, 1940–41, 1953–54, 1956–57, 1957–58, 1977–78
- Fife & Lothians Cup: 1936–37
- Cowdenbeath Cup: 1946–47, 1953–54, 1954–55, 1958–59
- Dunfermline Cup: 1934–35, 1936–37, 1955–56, 1956–57, 1971–72
- Mitchell Cup: 1949–50, 1957–58
- Express Cup: 1959–60
- Fife Drybrough Cup: 1973–74, 1975–76
- National Drybrough Cup: 1973–74
