= Dundonald Bluebell F.C. =

Association football club in Scotland

Dundonald Bluebell
- Full name: Dundonald Bluebell Football Club
- Nickname: The Bluebell
- Founded: 1938
- Ground: Moorside Park; Dundonald Park; Cardenden
- Capacity: 2,100
- Coordinates: 56°8′11″N 3°15′45″W
- Chairman: Dougie Rogerson
- Manager: Jason Dair
- League: East of Scotland League Premier Division
- 2025–26: East of Scotland League Premier Division, 13th of 16
- Website: https://www.dundonaldbluebellfc.co.uk/
Home colours

Dundonald Bluebell Football Club are a Scottish football club based in Cardenden, Fife. The team plays in the East of Scotland League Premier Division, having moved from the junior leagues in 2018. Their home ground is Moorside Park.

== History ==
Formed in 1938, they operated with considerable success as first-class Juveniles during their first seven seasons, winning the Scottish Juvenile Cup twice in succession (1944–45 and 1945–46). In 1946, Dundonald turned Junior and soon became one of Fife's foremost clubs, winning the league championship on three occasions in the 1950s.

The Bell were crowned champions of the East Region Central Division in 2006–07, and spent two seasons in the East Premier League before being relegated.

Season 2013–14 was a memorable one for the club as they gained promotion back to the East Premier League by finishing runners up in the East Region South League and also made the Scottish Junior Cup quarter-finals for the first time in their history, losing to eventual winners Hurlford United.

Two years later Bluebell won promotion to the East Superleague by finishing runners-up to Jeanfield Swifts in the 2015–16 East Premier League. The club also reached the final of the East of Scotland Cup in the same season, losing to Bo'ness United. Manager Craig Morrison left the club in the summer of 2016 to be replaced by Stevie Kay.

In 2018, the club was part of a large movement of eastern junior clubs to the East of Scotland Football League. A year later Dundonald become full members of the Scottish Football Association, allowing them to enter the Scottish Cup for the first time in 2019–20.

== Honours ==
=== League ===
- East Region Central Division
  - Winners: 2006–07
  - Runners-up: 2010–11, 2011–12
- East Region Premier League
  - Runners-up: 2015–16
- East Region South Division
  - Runners-up: 2013–14
- Fife Junior League
  - Champions (4): 1951–52, 1956–57, 1957–58, 1982–83
  - Runners-up: 1952–53, 1954–55, 1983–84

=== Cup ===
- Fife Cup winners (2): 1954–55, 1991–92; runners-up: 1956–57, 1976–77, 1986–87, 1994–95, 2005–06
- East Fife Cup winners: 1973–74
- Cowdenbeath Cup winners: 1964–65; runners-up: 1953–54, 1955–56, 1983–84
- Dunfermline Cup runners-up: 1947–48, 1950–51
- Laidlaw Shield winners (2): 1991–92, 1992–93
- Montrave Cup winners: 1969–70; runners-up: 1970–71
- Express Cup winners: 1965–66
- Mitchell Cup winners (2): 1947–48, 1948–49; runners-up: 1955–56, 1962–63
- Fife League Cup runners-up: 2011–12

== Records ==
- In 1946 the team won three cups in a 24-hour period (Friday evening, Saturday afternoon, Saturday evening).
- On 20 November 1951, the team created a Fife goalscoring record when they defeated Valleyfield Colliery 19–0. It could have been 20, but they missed a penalty.
