= Newburgh F.C. =

Association football club in Scotland

Newburgh Football Club
- Full name: Newburgh Football Club
- Nickname: The Burgh
- Founded: 1887 (as Tayside Albion)
- Ground: East Shore Park, Coach Road, Newburgh
- Capacity: 4000
- Coordinates: 56°21′11″N 3°14′9″W
- Chairman: Mark Roughead
- Manager: vacant
- League: East of Scotland League Second Division
- 2025–26: East of Scotland League Third Division, 6th of 11 (promoted)
- Website: https://www.newburghjfc.com/
Home colours	Away colours

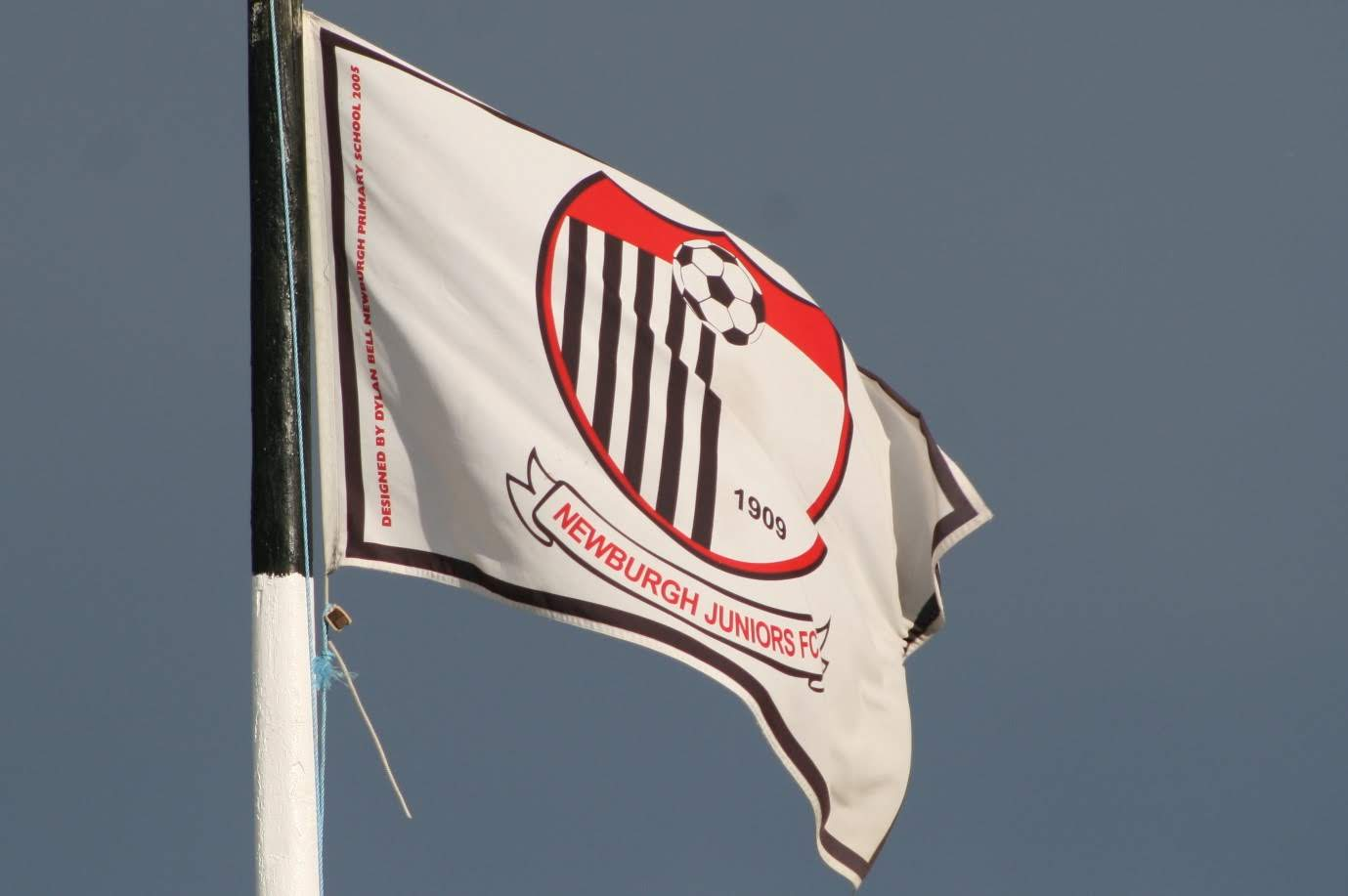
Newburgh FC flag

Newburgh Football Club are a Scottish football club based in Newburgh, Fife. Their home ground is East Shore Park. The club was founded as Tayside Albion in 1887, changed their name to Newburgh West End in 1910, and assumed their current name in 1935. Team colours are black and white.

The Scottish Junior Football Association (SJFA) restructured prior to the 2006–07 season, and Newburgh found themselves in the 12-team East Region, Central Division. They finished 11th in their first season in the division.

Newburgh have twice reached the semi-final stage of the Scottish Junior Cup, playing Renfrew in 1962 and Cambuslang Rangers in 1973. The club lost 4–0 on both occasions. Their quarter-final tie in 1962 against Irvine Meadow attracted a record crowd of 3,960 to East Shore Park.

The team were managed between February 2018 and March 2021 by Scott Hudson with assistants Scott Lawson, Willie Hutchison and Liam Baillie. Due to relocation Hudson resigned as manager in March 2021. Tony Mcaulay was appointed as the new manager in May 2021 in time for the start of season 2021–22.

In April 2020, Newburgh FC's application to join the East of Scotland Football League within the senior pyramid was approved at the association AGM. Newburgh will join all of the former Fife Junior football clubs in the league from season 2020-21 onwards.

== East Shore Park ==
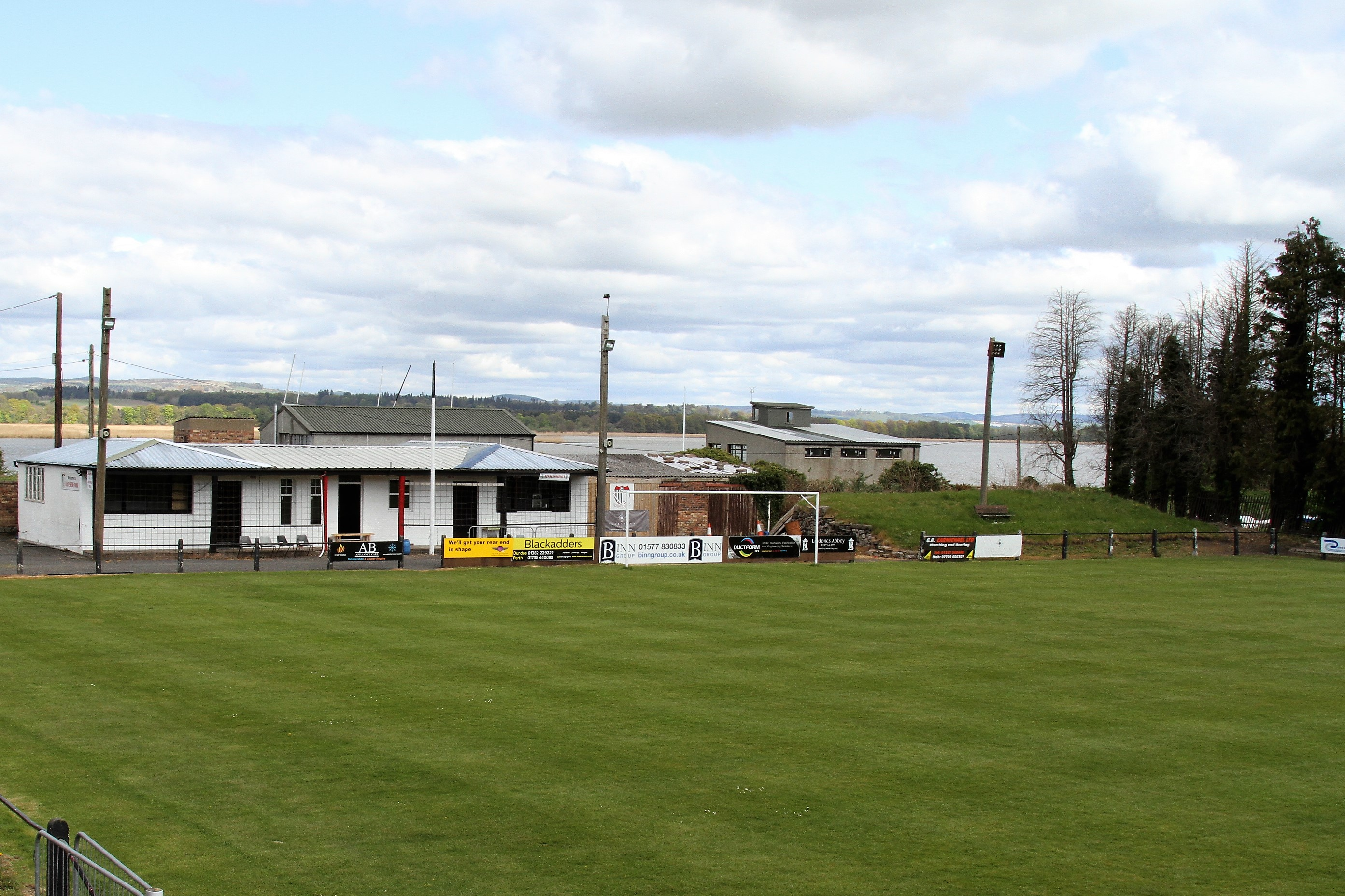
Newburgh have played at East Shore Park since 1910.

== Honours ==
- Fife League winners: 1972–73, 1976–77
- Perthshire Junior League winners: 1946–47, 1953–54, 1954–55, 1955–56, 1956–57
- Fife Junior (PSM) Cup: 1952–53, 1961–62, 1964–65, 1966–67, 1969–70, 1973–74
- Cowdenbeath (Interbrew) Cup: 1960–61, 1966–67, 1975–76
- East Fife Cup: 1936–37, 1965–66, 1972–73
- Currie (Findlay & Co) Cup: 1953–54, 1954–55
- Perthshire Junior Consolation Cup: 1950–51
- Express Cup: 1961–62, 1966–67
- Mitchell Cup: 1954–55, 1960–61, 1963–64, 1964–65
- P.A. Cup: 1949–50, 1953–54, 1954–55, 1957–58, 1958–59
- Perthshire Rosebowl: 1953–54, 1954–55, 1956–5766–67, 1975–76
- East Fife Cup: 1936–37, 1965–66, 1972–73
- Currie (Findlay & Co) Cup: 1953–54, 1954–55
- Perthshire Junior Consolation Cup: 1950–51
- Express Cup: 1961–62, 1966–67
- Mitchell Cup: 1954–55, 1960–61, 1963–64, 1964–65
- P.A. Cup: 1949–50, 1953–54, 1954–55, 1957–58, 1958–59
- Perthshire Rosebowl: 1953–54, 1954–55, 1956–57
