= Thornton Hibs F.C. =

Association football club in Scotland

Thornton Hibs
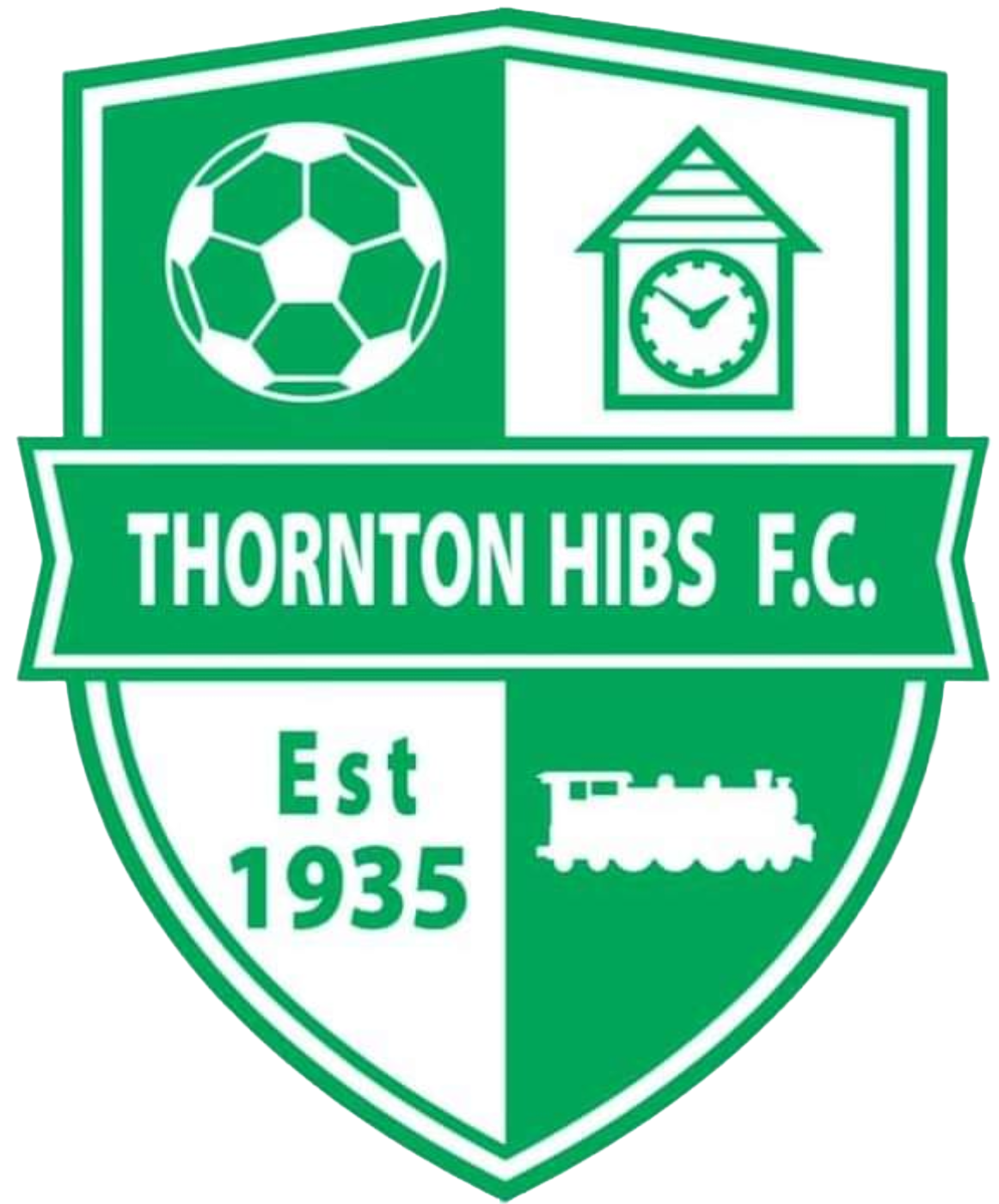
- Full name: Thornton Hibs Football Club
- Nickname: The Hibs
- Founded: 1935
- Ground: Memorial Park
- Capacity: 1500
- Coordinates: 56°9′58″N 3°8′37″W
- Chairman: Graeme Turnbull
- Manager: Craig Gilbert
- League: East of Scotland League Premier Division
- 2025–26: East of Scotland League First Division, 2nd of 16 (promoted)
Home colours	Away colours

Thornton Hibs Football Club are a Scottish football club based in Thornton, Fife. Their home ground is Memorial Park and the team colours are green and white. They play in the East of Scotland Football League.

The Scottish Junior Football Association restructured prior to the 2006–07 season, and Hibs found themselves in the 12-team East Region, Central Division. They finished ninth in their first season in the division.

In May 2020, the club confirmed they had successfully applied to join the East of Scotland Football League within the senior pyramid.

== Honours ==
- Fife Junior Football League: 1952–53, 1958–59, 1968–69
- Fife League East: 1937–38
- Fife Cup: 1935–36, 1958–59, 1974–75
- Fife & Lothians Cup: 2018–19
- SJFA East Fife / Central: 2003–04, 2009–10
- SJFA East North: 2014–15
