= Rosyth F.C. =

Association football club in Scotland

Rosyth
- Full name: Rosyth Football Club
- Nickname: The Rec
- Founded: 1992
- Dissolved: 2024
Home colours	Away colours

Rosyth Football Club was a Scottish football club based in Rosyth, Fife. Until 2006, they were known as Rosyth Recreation.

A Junior football team was first established in Rosyth in 1916, with an affiliated senior team being established in 1919 that were called Rosyth Dockyard Recreation. The Junior side folded in 1926 only to be reformed after World War II in 1946. It was in that year that Rosyth attracted a record crowd of 4000 in a cup tie against Bo'ness United; three seasons later, Rosyth (or "The Rec," as they were known) enjoyed their most successful period when they won the treble – Fife League, Fife Cup and Cowdenbeath Cup. This club folded in 1957.

In 1992, after several decades without a Junior football team, semi-professional football returned to the Garden City. Local team Dunfermline Jubilee Athletic (founded in 1967) were without a ground so relocated to New Recreation Park and renamed themselves Rosyth Recreation. The club left Recreation Park in 2018 to move to the nearby Fleet Grounds.

Former Scotland international, Stevie Crawford, began his career at the club before leaving for Raith Rovers in late 1992.

Roysth Recreation initially competed in the Fife Junior League, with a best finish of second in 2004–05. The SJFA restructured prior to the 2006–07 season and Rosyth found themselves in the East Region Premier League, where they finished third in their first season but were soon relegated. Their best result in the East Region's bottom tier was 2nd in 2008–09.

The club were top of the East Region South Premier League when the season was declared null & void due to the COVID-19 pandemic, before their move to the East of Scotland League in May 2020.

In September 2022, the Rec hired Greig Denham as manager. He replaced Brian Muirhead. Denham resigned in August 2023, with Stevie Crawford replacing him.

In February 2024, the club announced their decision to cease operations after failing to agree terms on movement to a new playing ground. A club statement read, "It is with huge reluctance and sadness that Rosyth FC Seniors have to announce, with immediate effect, they are closing the doors on the club."

== Honours ==
Fife League Cup: 2003–04
