= 2016–17 East Superleague =

McBookie.com East Superleague
- Season: 2016–17
- Dates: 6 August 2017 – 3 June 2018
- Champions: Kelty Hearts
- Relegated: Musselburgh Athletic; Fauldhouse United
- Matches: 240
- Goals: 844 (3.52 per match)
- Biggest home win: Bo'ness United 7–0 Fauldhouse United (18 February 2017)
- Biggest away win: Broughty Athletic 0–6 Bonnyrigg Rose Athletic (20 May 2017)
- Highest scoring: Dundonald Bluebell 5–6 Broxburn Athletic (15 October 2016)

The 2016–17 East Superleague (known as the McBookie.com East Superleague for sponsorship reasons) was the 15th season of the East Superleague, the top tier of league competition for SJFA East Region member clubs.

The season began on 6 August 2016 and ended on 3 June 2017. Bonnyrigg Rose Athletic were the reigning champions.

Kelty Hearts clinched the championship on 31 May 2017, the club's second title in three seasons. As winners they entered the preliminary round of the 2017–18 Scottish Cup.

== Teams ==
The following teams changed division prior to the 2016–17 season.

=== To East Superleague ===
Promoted from East Premier League

- Jeanfield Swifts
- Dundonald Bluebell
- Lochee United

=== From East Superleague ===
Relegated to East Premier League

- Sauchie Juniors
- St Andrews United
- Tayport

=== Stadia and locations ===
Club	Location	Ground	Manager	Finishing position 2015–16
Bo'ness United	Bo'ness	Newtown Park	Allan McGonigal	4th
Bonnyrigg Rose Athletic	Bonnyrigg	New Dundas Park	Robbie Horn	Champions
Broughty Athletic	Dundee	Whitton Park	Keith Gibson	10th
Broxburn Athletic	Broxburn	Albyn Park	Max Christie	6th
Camelon Juniors	Camelon	Carmuirs Park	Gordon Herd	11th
Carnoustie Panmure	Carnoustie	Laing Park	Alan McSkimming	12th
Dundonald Bluebell	Cardenden	Moorside Park	Stevie Kay	East Premier League, 2nd
Fauldhouse United	Fauldhouse	Park View	Jon Connolly	13th
Hill of Beath Hawthorn	Hill of Beath	Keirs Park	Kevin Fotheringham	8th
Jeanfield Swifts	Perth	Riverside Park	Ross Gunnion	East Premier League, 1st
Kelty Hearts	Kelty	New Central Park	Tam Courts	2nd
Linlithgow Rose	Linlithgow	Prestonfield	Mark Bradley	3rd
Lochee United	Dundee	Thomson Park	George Shields	East Premier League, 3rd
Musselburgh Athletic	Musselburgh	Olivebank Stadium	Calvin Shand	7th
Newtongrange Star	Newtongrange	New Victoria Park	Stevie McLeish	5th
Penicuik Athletic	Penicuik	Penicuik Park	Johnny Harvey	9th

=== Managerial changes ===
Club	Outgoing manager	Manner of departure	Date of vacancy	Position in table	Incoming manager	Date of appointment
Fauldhouse United	David Cowan	Resigned	13 June 2016	Close season	Stephen Findlay	24 June 2016
Lochee United	Steven Leahy	Resigned	23 June 2016	Close season	George Shields	1 July 2016
Penicuik Athletic	Craig Meikle	Resigned	28 June 2016	Close season	Johnny Harvey	30 June 2016
Dundonald Bluebell	Craig Morrison	Resigned	30 June 2016	Close season	Stevie Kay	3 July 2016
Camelon Juniors	Murray McDowell	Sacked	27 September 2016	11th	Gordon Herd	21 October 2016
Linlithgow Rose	David McGlynn	Resigned	3 October 2016	9th	Todd Lumsden	31 October 2016
Fauldhouse United	Stephen Findlay	Resigned	21 December 2016	16th	David Cowan	21 December 2016
Fauldhouse United	David Cowan	Sacked	21 February 2017	16th	Jon Connolly	21 February 2017
Linlithgow Rose	Todd Lumsden	Sacked	2 May 2017	15th	Mark Bradley	22 May 2017
Hill of Beath Hawthorn	Bobby Wilson	Mutual consent	14 May 2017	9th	Kevin Fotheringham	20 May 2017

== League table ==
Pos	Team	Pld	W	D	L	GF	GA	GD	Pts	Qualification or relegation
1	Kelty Hearts (C)	30	25	3	2	84	29	+55	78	Qualification for 2017–18 Scottish Cup
2	Bonnyrigg Rose Athletic	30	23	0	7	70	25	+45	69	
3	Bo'ness United	30	17	4	9	73	34	+39	55	
4	Penicuik Athletic	30	14	7	9	65	47	+18	49	
5	Lochee United	30	15	4	11	53	48	+5	49	
6	Dundonald Bluebell	30	13	6	11	65	58	+7	45	
7	Broughty Athletic	30	12	7	11	46	55	−9	43	
8	Broxburn Athletic	30	12	6	12	69	57	+12	42	
9	Linlithgow Rose	30	11	7	12	39	37	+2	40	
10	Hill of Beath Hawthorn	30	9	7	14	42	53	−11	34	
11	Carnoustie Panmure	30	9	6	15	43	76	−33	33	
12	Camelon Juniors	30	7	11	12	34	52	−18	32	
13	Jeanfield Swifts	30	8	8	14	51	74	−23	32	
14	Newtongrange Star (Q)	30	7	9	14	43	62	−19	30	Qualification for East Region League play-off
15	Musselburgh Athletic (R)	30	6	11	13	42	48	−6	29	Relegation to East Premier League
16	Fauldhouse United (R)	30	3	2	25	25	89	−64	11	Relegation to East Premier League

Source: East Region SJFA
Rules for classification: 1) points; 2) goal difference; 3) number of goals scored.
(C) Champions; (Q) Qualified for the phase indicated; (R) Relegated

== Results ==
Home \ Away	BNS	BRG	BRT	BRX	CAM	CAR	DND	FAU	HOB	JEA	KEL	LTH	LOC	MUS	NEW	PEN
Bo'ness United		2–3	3–0	0–1	0–0	4–1	2–1	7–0	1–2	5–1	1–2	2–0	3–4	5–1	4–1	5–0
Bonnyrigg Rose Athletic	2–0		4–0	3–1	1–0	5–0	4–0	2–0	1–0	5–0	2–4	0–2	3–0	1–2	3–0	3–0
Broughty Athletic	0–1	0–6		1–6	0–1	3–4	3–1	3–2	1–0	3–3	0–0	2–2	2–3	2–0	2–2	1–0
Broxburn Athletic	1–3	1–0	0–2		5–0	3–0	1–2	4–0	0–3	7–3	1–2	0–1	3–1	1–5	1–1	3–3
Camelon Juniors	1–5	1–2	5–2	1–1		2–3	3–3	2–1	2–2	1–2	0–3	2–1	2–1	1–1	1–1	0–1
Carnoustie Panmure	1–3	2–1	0–4	1–6	1–1		2–2	4–0	2–0	0–1	1–5	1–0	0–2	1–2	2–4	1–5
Dundonald Bluebell	5–0	3–1	1–2	5–6	1–0	2–3		1–2	1–0	4–2	2–1	1–1	2–3	3–1	0–0	2–5
Fauldhouse United	1–3	0–2	0–2	1–3	1–3	2–2	0–5		1–2	0–2	1–3	1–4	0–5	1–4	4–2	0–0
Hill of Beath Hawthorn	0–2	2–3	1–3	3–3	0–1	1–1	4–4	3–1		3–1	2–5	1–0	0–2	1–1	3–0	0–2
Jeanfield Swifts	0–5	1–3	1–1	3–3	4–0	2–2	2–3	1–3	3–1		2–3	0–1	0–0	2–1	4–4	2–3
Kelty Hearts	2–1	3–0	3–1	2–0	1–1	5–0	1–0	3–0	4–1	1–2		2–0	4–1	3–1	5–3	3–3
Linlithgow Rose	0–3	0–1	1–2	2–1	1–1	1–2	2–2	3–1	0–0	1–1	0–2		4–1	2–0	0–1	0–2
Lochee United	2–2	0–3	2–0	1–0	4–0	3–0	0–2	2–0	1–3	5–2	0–5	1–3		0–0	1–2	2–0
Musselburgh Athletic	1–0	0–1	1–2	1–2	1–1	3–3	1–2	4–0	1–1	2–2	1–2	2–2	1–1		1–1	2–3
Newtongrange Star	0–0	0–1	1–1	2–2	2–0	4–1	1–4	2–1	2–3	0–2	2–4	2–3	0–2	1–0		2–4
Penicuik Athletic	1–1	1–4	1–1	5–3	1–1	0–2	5–1	6–1	4–0	4–0	0–1	0–2	2–3	1–1	3–0	

Source: East Region SJFA
Legend: Blue = home team win; Yellow = draw; Red = away team win.

=== East Region Super/Premier League play-off ===
Forfar West End, who finished third in the East Premier League, defeated Newtongrange Star 3–2 on aggregate in the East Region Super/Premier League play-off to gain promotion. However, Newtongrange were reprieved from relegation to balance league numbers following the departure of Kelty Hearts to the East of Scotland Football League.

27 May 2017
19:30

Forfar West End	3 – 1	Newtongrange Star
Graeme Hart 8', 20'; Matty Ramsay 23'		5' Lee Currie

Strathmore Park, Forfar
3 June 2017
19:30

Newtongrange Star	1 – 0	Forfar West End
James Flynn 42'

New Victoria Park, Newtongrange
