= 2017–18 East Superleague =

McBookie.com East Superleague
- Season: 2017–18
- Dates: 5 August 2017 – 2 June 2018
- Champions: Bonnyrigg Rose Athletic
- Relegated: none
- Matches: 240
- Goals: 858 (3.58 per match)
- Biggest home win: Broxburn Athletic 8–0 Forfar West End (6 January 2018)
- Biggest away win: Jeanfield Swifts 0–7 Carnoustie Panmure (28 April 2018)
- Highest scoring: Broxburn Athletic 7–2 Newtongrange Star (16 September 2017)

The 2017–18 East Superleague (known as the McBookie.com East Superleague for sponsorship reasons) was the 16th season of the East Superleague, the top tier of league competition for SJFA East Region member clubs.

The season began on 5 August 2017 and ended on 2 June 2018. Kelty Hearts were the reigning champions but did not defend their title after joining the East of Scotland Football League.

Bonnyrigg Rose Athletic clinched the championship on 26 May 2018, the club's second title in three seasons. As winners they entered the preliminary round of the 2018–19 Scottish Cup.

== Teams ==
The following teams changed division prior to the 2017–18 season.

=== To East Superleague ===
Promoted from East Premier League

- Sauchie Juniors
- Kennoway Star Hearts
- Forfar West End

=== From East Superleague ===
Relegated to East Premier League

- Musselburgh Athletic
- Fauldhouse United

Transferred to East of Scotland League

- Kelty Hearts

Forfar West End were promoted after defeating Newtongrange Star 3–2 on aggregate in the East Region Super/Premier League Play Off; however, Newtongrange were reprieved from relegation to balance league numbers following the departure of Kelty.

=== Stadia and locations ===
Club	Location	Ground	Manager	Finishing position 2016–17
Bo'ness United	Bo'ness	Newtown Park	Steve Kerrigan	3rd
Bonnyrigg Rose Athletic	Bonnyrigg	New Dundas Park	David White	2nd
Broughty Athletic	Dundee	Whitton Park	Jamie McCunnie	7th
Broxburn Athletic	Broxburn	Albyn Park	Brian McNaughton	8th
Camelon Juniors	Camelon	Carmuirs Park	Gordon Herd	12th
Carnoustie Panmure	Carnoustie	Laing Park	Alan McSkimming	11th
Dundonald Bluebell	Cardenden	Moorside Park	Jason Dair	6th
Forfar West End	Forfar	Strathmore Park	Daryl McKenzie	East Premier League, 3rd
Hill of Beath Hawthorn	Hill of Beath	Keirs Park	Kevin Fotheringham	10th
Jeanfield Swifts	Perth	Riverside Park	Ross Gunnion	13th
Kennoway Star Hearts	Star	Treaton Park	Craig Johnstone	East Premier League, 2nd
Linlithgow Rose	Linlithgow	Prestonfield	Mark Bradley	9th
Lochee United	Dundee	Thomson Park	George Shields	5th
Newtongrange Star	Newtongrange	New Victoria Park	Stevie McLeish	14th
Penicuik Athletic	Penicuik	Penicuik Park	Johnny Harvey	4th
Sauchie Juniors	Sauchie	Beechwood Park	Fraser Duncan	East Premier League, 1st

=== Managerial changes ===
Club	Outgoing manager	Manner of departure	Date of vacancy	Position in table	Incoming manager	Date of appointment
Kennoway Star Hearts	Alex Davidson	Stepped down through illness	18 July 2017	Close season	Craig Johnstone	18 Jul 2017 (interim)/17 Sep 2017 (permanent)
Broughty Athletic	Keith Gibson	Resigned	1 August 2017	Close season	Jim Finlayson	14 September 2017
Bonnyrigg Rose Athletic	Robbie Horn	Appointed manager at Berwick Rangers	29 August 2017	2nd	David White	5 September 2017
Broxburn Athletic	Max Christie	Resigned	12 November 2017	7th	Brian McNaughton	1 December 2017
Bo'ness United	Allan McGonigal	Resigned	6 January 2018	12th	Steve Kerrigan	6 January 2018
Broughty Athletic	Jim Finlayson	Resigned	29 January 2018	7th	Jamie McCunnie	29 January 2018
Dundonald Bluebell	Stevie Kay	Resigned	18 March 2018	5th	Jason Dair	21 March 2018

== League table ==
With eleven Superleague clubs moving to the East of Scotland Football League for the 2018–19 season, relegation was suspended pending league reconstruction.

Pos	Team	Pld	W	D	L	GF	GA	GD	Pts	Qualification or relegation
1	Bonnyrigg Rose Athletic (C)	30	20	9	1	83	23	+60	69	Qualification to 2018–19 Scottish Cup and transferred to the East of Scotland League
2	Linlithgow Rose	30	21	2	7	69	37	+32	65	Transferred to the East of Scotland League
3	Penicuik Athletic	30	17	6	7	55	31	+24	57	Transferred to the East of Scotland League
4	Dundonald Bluebell	30	18	1	11	68	55	+13	55	Transferred to the East of Scotland League
5	Broxburn Athletic	30	13	10	7	76	55	+21	49	Transferred to the East of Scotland League
6	Lochee United	30	14	3	13	58	50	+8	45	
7	Hill of Beath Hawthorn	30	11	9	10	54	47	+7	42	Transferred to the East of Scotland League
8	Bo'ness United	30	12	5	13	57	53	+4	41	Transferred to the East of Scotland League
9	Camelon Juniors	30	13	2	15	55	57	−2	41	Transferred to the East of Scotland League
10	Broughty Athletic	30	11	7	12	48	56	−8	40	
11	Newtongrange Star	30	12	3	15	55	59	−4	39	Transferred to the East of Scotland League
12	Carnoustie Panmure	30	12	3	15	50	63	−13	39	
13	Sauchie Juniors	30	9	6	15	36	55	−19	33	Transferred to the East of Scotland League
14	Jeanfield Swifts	30	9	4	17	44	71	−27	31	Transferred to the East of Scotland League
15	Kennoway Star Hearts	30	5	6	19	42	89	−47	21	
16	Forfar West End	30	4	2	24	18	67	−49	14	

Source: East Region SJFA
Rules for classification: 1) Points; 2) Goal difference; 3) Goals scored
(C) Champions

== Results ==
Home \ Away	BNS	BRG	BRT	BRX	CAM	CAR	DND	FWE	HOB	JEA	KSH	LTH	LOC	NEW	PEN	SCH
Bo'ness United		3–3	3–3	2–2	1–0	2–1	0–1	1–0	2–2	5–1	4–1	1–2	3–0	1–0	1–3	2–2
Bonnyrigg Rose Athletic	3–0		5–0	3–0	2–0	4–0	2–0	2–0	2–1	6–0	5–1	0–0	4–4	5–1	3–2	5–0
Broughty Athletic	4–1	0–0		2–2	1–2	0–2	1–3	3–1	3–3	2–1	4–2	0–1	1–1	1–0	1–4	1–0
Broxburn Athletic	3–2	3–1	4–0		4–0	3–3	3–5	8–0	3–1	2–2	2–2	1–0	3–0	7–2	1–6	4–4
Camelon Juniors	1–3	0–0	2–3	4–0		4–3	2–0	3–1	1–2	2–1	4–0	1–4	1–3	4–3	1–0	4–3
Carnoustie Panmure	2–1	0–3	2–6	3–2	3–1		0–4	2–1	4–3	1–3	3–1	0–3	0–5	0–2	0–3	2–0
Dundonald Bluebell	0–2	0–3	3–0	0–4	4–1	3–2		4–1	2–1	4–0	3–2	1–2	1–0	3–1	1–3	1–0
Forfar West End	2–1	0–3	0–3	1–2	1–2	0–2	1–2		0–0	0–1	0–2	0–4	2–1	0–4	0–1	0–0
Hill of Beath Hawthorn	5–1	2–2	4–1	1–1	4–0	2–1	1–1	0–1		3–2	1–0	1–2	2–3	2–2	0–1	3–2
Jeanfield Swifts	2–0	1–4	1–1	0–0	1–4	0–7	0–1	6–0	0–1		5–1	2–5	0–4	1–3	2–1	3–0
Kennoway Star Hearts	0–6	0–4	1–1	2–2	0–6	3–3	0–3	1–0	0–2	2–2		1–2	2–1	5–2	1–2	1–2
Linlithgow Rose	1–2	1–4	4–1	4–1	3–1	2–0	5–2	1–0	3–0	2–1	5–5		1–0	1–0	1–3	1–0
Lochee United	1–3	1–2	1–0	3–1	3–2	0–2	3–1	3–2	2–2	0–1	4–2	1–5		4–3	1–0	2–3
Newtongrange Star	4–2	0–0	0–2	1–2	1–0	1–2	2–0	4–1	2–4	4–3	6–1	3–1	1–0		0–3	2–2
Penicuik Athletic	3–2	2–2	2–1	1–1	1–1	0–0	3–1	1–0	1–1	0–2	4–1	3–2	0–3	2–0		0–0
Sauchie Juniors	1–0	1–1	1–2	0–5	2–1	1–0	0–4	0–3	2–0	6–0	1–2	2–1	0–4	0–1	1–0	

Updated to match(es) played on unknown. Source: East Region SJFA
Legend: Blue = home team win; Yellow = draw; Red = away team win.
