= 2015–16 East Superleague =

McBookie.com East Superleague
- Season: 2015–16
- Dates: 8 August 2015 – 4 June 2016
- Champions: Bonnyrigg Rose Athletic
- Relegated: Sauchie Juniors; St Andrews United; Tayport
- Matches: 240
- Goals: 835 (3.48 per match)
- Biggest home win: Bonnyrigg Rose Athletic 7–0 St Andrews United (12 March 2016)
- Biggest away win: Broxburn Athletic 0–6 Bonnyrigg Rose Athletic (19 December 2015); Tayport 0–6 Musselburgh Athletic; 3 October 2015

The 2015–16 East Superleague (known as the McBookie.com East Superleague for sponsorship reasons) was the 14th season of the East Superleague, the top tier of league competition for SJFA East Region member clubs.

The season began on 8 August 2015 and ended on 4 June 2016. Kelty Hearts were the reigning champions.

Bonnyrigg Rose Athletic secured the title on 18 May 2016, their third East Superleague championship. As winners they entered the preliminary round of the 2016–17 Scottish Cup.

== Teams ==
The following teams changed division prior to the 2015–16 season.

=== To East Superleague ===
Promoted from East Premier League

- Tayport
- St Andrews United
- Broughty Athletic

=== From East Superleague ===
Relegated to East Premier League

- Armadale Thistle
- Lochee United

Folded

- Ballingry Rovers

=== Stadia and locations ===
Club	Location	Ground	Manager	Finishing position 2014–15
Bo'ness United	Bo'ness	Newtown Park	Allan McGonigal	2nd
Bonnyrigg Rose Athletic	Bonnyrigg	New Dundas Park	Robbie Horn	7th
Broughty Athletic	Dundee	Whitton Park	Keith Gibson	East Premier League, 3rd
Broxburn Athletic	Broxburn	Albyn Park	Max Christie	8th
Camelon Juniors	Camelon	Carmuirs Park	Murray McDowell	12th
Carnoustie Panmure	Carnoustie	Laing Park	Alan McSkimming	13th
Fauldhouse United	Fauldhouse	Park View	David Cowan	10th
Hill of Beath Hawthorn	Hill of Beath	Keirs Park	Bobby Wilson	9th
Kelty Hearts	Kelty	Central Park	Tam Courts	Champions
Linlithgow Rose	Linlithgow	Prestonfield	David McGlynn	3rd
Musselburgh Athletic	Musselburgh	Olivebank Stadium		11th
Newtongrange Star	Newtongrange	New Victoria Park	Stevie McLeish	4th
Penicuik Athletic	Penicuik	Penicuik Park	Craig Meikle	6th
St Andrews United	St Andrews	Recreation Park	Ian Barrett	East Premier League, 2nd
Sauchie Juniors	Sauchie	Beechwood Park	Fraser Duncan	5th
Tayport	Tayport	Canniepairt	John Ovenstone	East Premier League, 1st

=== Managerial changes ===
Club	Outgoing manager	Manner of departure	Date of vacancy	Position in table	Incoming manager	Date of appointment
Linlithgow Rose	Danny Smith	Resigned	7 June 2015	Close season	David McGlynn	9 June 2015
Bonnyrigg Rose Athletic	David McGlynn	Resigned	9 June 2015	Close season	Robbie Horn	12 June 2015
Hill of Beath Hawthorn	Jock Finlayson	Resigned	12 June 2015	Close season	Bobby Wilson	12 June 2015
Tayport	Dave Baikie	Resigned	31 October 2015	16th	John Ovenstone	31 October 2015
St Andrews United	Phil McGuire	Sacked	5 December 2015	15th	Ian Barrett	13 December 2015
Camelon Juniors	John Sludden	Resigned	7 May 2016	12th	Grant Tierney (caretaker)	20 May 2016
Newtongrange Star	Alan Miller	Sacked	8 May 2016	6th	Stevie McLeish	20 May 2016
Musselburgh Athletic	Stevie McLeish	Appointed manager at Newtongrange Star	20 May 2016	7th	Calvin Shand	17 June 2016
Camelon Juniors	Grant Tierney	End of caretaker spell	1 June 2016	11th (season complete)	Murray McDowell	5 June 2016

== League table ==
Pos	Team	Pld	W	D	L	GF	GA	GD	Pts	Qualification or relegation
1	Bonnyrigg Rose Athletic (C)	30	23	4	3	85	31	+54	73	Qualification for 2016–17 Scottish Cup
2	Kelty Hearts	30	19	5	6	59	30	+29	62	
3	Linlithgow Rose	30	18	6	6	64	39	+25	60	
4	Bo'ness United	30	17	5	8	60	36	+24	56	
5	Newtongrange Star	30	15	2	13	45	38	+7	47	
6	Broxburn Athletic	30	13	5	12	51	54	−3	44	
7	Musselburgh Athletic	30	13	4	13	56	54	+2	43	
8	Hill of Beath Hawthorn	30	12	5	13	54	48	+6	41	
9	Penicuik Athletic	30	12	5	13	47	56	−9	41	
10	Broughty Athletic	30	12	3	15	49	54	−5	39	
11	Camelon Juniors	30	10	6	14	49	57	−8	36	
12	Carnoustie Panmure	30	11	1	18	50	63	−13	34	
13	Fauldhouse United	30	9	5	16	44	61	−17	32	
14	Sauchie Juniors (R)	30	9	5	16	52	70	−18	32	Qualification for East Region League play-off
15	St Andrews United (R)	30	7	3	20	38	68	−30	24	Relegation to East Premier League
16	Tayport (R)	30	7	2	21	32	76	−44	23	Relegation to East Premier League

Source: East Region SJFA
Rules for classification: 1) points; 2) goal difference; 3) number of goals scored.
(C) Champions; (R) Relegated

== Results ==
Home \ Away	BNS	BRG	BRT	BRX	CAM	CAR	FAU	HOB	KEL	LTH	MUS	NEW	PEN	STA	SCH	TAY
Bo'ness United		2–1	0–1	1–0	1–3	2–1	3–1	4–3	0–0	1–1	1–1	0–2	5–0	5–1	1–3	3–0
Bonnyrigg Rose Athletic	3–2		3–0	1–1	3–0	2–0	4–3	3–2	4–4	0–2	3–1	3–1	4–0	7–0	3–2	2–1
Broughty Athletic	0–3	1–2		1–2	0–0	5–1	1–2	1–2	0–3	3–2	5–3	1–0	0–3	1–0	2–3	1–0
Broxburn Athletic	1–1	0–6	2–1		3–0	3–1	4–1	2–1	2–2	1–2	1–2	1–4	2–1	0–4	2–3	1–3
Camelon Juniors	0–1	3–3	2–0	2–3		2–3	0–1	1–0	1–3	2–2	3–3	4–1	2–2	3–1	2–0	5–3
Carnoustie Panmure	1–1	0–5	0–1	2–5	3–0		0–3	1–2	3–1	3–4	4–1	0–1	2–3	2–0	4–1	1–0
Fauldhouse United	2–5	0–4	4–4	0–0	0–0	4–1		1–3	1–2	3–4	0–2	1–1	0–2	2–0	2–6	2–0
Hill of Beath Hawthorn	1–3	2–3	5–0	1–2	3–1	2–3	1–2		0–0	2–1	2–2	2–0	1–0	0–2	3–1	3–4
Kelty Hearts	3–1	0–1	2–0	1–0	3–0	3–2	3–1	1–1		1–0	0–1	1–0	4–0	3–0	3–1	1–2
Linlithgow Rose	3–0	2–2	2–1	1–0	5–2	3–2	2–0	2–2	3–1		1–0	2–0	2–2	3–1	3–0	1–1
Musselburgh Athletic	0–4	0–3	0–2	2–3	2–1	2–0	4–1	0–2	1–3	2–1		1–2	2–3	2–1	6–1	3–2
Newtongrange Star	1–2	0–2	3–2	2–1	6–1	2–0	2–0	3–1	1–0	2–1	0–1		1–2	3–0	1–3	0–1
Penicuik Athletic	2–1	0–3	1–4	2–2	0–2	3–1	2–2	1–2	1–3	0–1	1–1	0–1		4–0	3–2	2–0
St Andrews United	1–2	2–0	0–5	2–3	0–4	2–3	0–2	1–1	2–3	1–2	3–0	3–0	1–2		4–4	1–0
Sauchie Juniors	0–2	0–2	2–2	2–4	0–2	0–2	1–0	3–0	1–2	3–1	1–5	2–2	1–3	1–1		3–1
Tayport	0–3	0–3	2–4	2–0	2–1	0–4	0–3	0–4	0–3	1–5	0–6	0–3	4–2	1–4	2–2	

Updated to match(es) played on 4 June 2016. Source: East Region SJFA
Legend: Blue = home team win; Yellow = draw; Red = away team win.

=== East Region Super/Premier League play-off ===
Lochee United, who finished third in the East Premier League, defeated Sauchie Juniors 10–0 on aggregate in the East Region Super/Premier League play-off to gain promotion.

6 June 2016
19:30

Sauchie Juniors	0 – 5	Lochee United
		9' Pat Martin; 64', 82' Bryan Deasley; 70', 89' Phil Hagan

Beechwood Park, Sauchie
Referee: Stewart Luke
8 June 2016
19:30

Lochee United	5 – 0	Sauchie Juniors
Scot McComiskey 25'; Connor Birse 35'; Ryan Winter 45'; Phil Hagan 58', 70' (pen.)

Thomson Park, Dundee
Referee: Scott Leslie
