= 2014–15 East Superleague =

McBookie.com East Superleague
- Season: 2014–15
- Dates: 6 August 2015 – 3 June 2016
- Champions: Kelty Hearts
- Relegated: Armadale Thistle; Lochee United
- Matches: 210
- Goals: 704 (3.35 per match)

The 2014–15 East Superleague (known as the McBookie.com East Superleague for sponsorship reasons) was the 13th season of the East Superleague, the top tier of league competition for SJFA East Region member clubs.

The season began on 6 August 2014 and ended on 3 June 2015. Bo'ness United were the reigning champions.

Ballingry Rovers folded on 25 November 2014 and withdrew from the league with immediate effect. Their playing record was expunged.

Kelty Hearts won their first East Superleague title on 13 May 2015. As champions they entered the preliminary round of the 2015–16 Scottish Cup.

== Teams ==
The following teams changed division after the 2013–14 season.

=== To East Superleague ===
Promoted from East Premier League

- Penicuik Athletic
- Fauldhouse United

=== From East Superleague ===
Relegated to East Premier League

- St Andrews United
- Tayport

=== Stadia and locations ===
Club	Location	Ground	Manager	Finishing position 2013–14
Armadale Thistle	Armadale	Volunteer Park	Jim Henderson	11th
Ballingry Rovers (folded)	Glencraig	Ore Park	Willie Garner	13th
Bo'ness United	Bo'ness	Newtown Park	Allan McGonigal	Champions
Bonnyrigg Rose Athletic	Bonnyrigg	New Dundas Park	David McGlynn	3rd
Broxburn Athletic	Broxburn	Albyn Park	Max Christie	7th
Camelon Juniors	Camelon	Carmuirs Park	John Sludden	5th
Carnoustie Panmure	Carnoustie	Laing Park	Alan McSkimming	12th
Fauldhouse United	Fauldhouse	Park View	David Cowan	East Premier League, 2nd
Hill of Beath Hawthorn	Hill of Beath	Keirs Park	Jock Finlayson	6th
Kelty Hearts	Kelty	Central Park	Tam Courts	14th
Linlithgow Rose	Linlithgow	Prestonfield	Danny Smith	2nd
Lochee United	Dundee	Thomson Park	Steven Leahy	10th
Musselburgh Athletic	Musselburgh	Olivebank Stadium	Stevie McLeish	8th
Newtongrange Star	Newtongrange	New Victoria Park	Alan Miller	4th
Penicuik Athletic	Penicuik	Penicuik Park	Craig Meikle	East Premier League, 1st
Sauchie Juniors	Sauchie	Beechwood Park	Fraser Duncan	9th

=== Managerial changes ===
Club	Outgoing manager	Manner of departure	Date of vacancy	Position in table	Incoming manager	Date of appointment
Ballingry Rovers	Stevie Kay	Resigned	8 June 2014	Close season	Lee Dair	10 June 2014
Bonnyrigg Rose Athletic	Max Christie	Resigned	30 August 2014	15th	David McGlynn	14 September 2014
Musselburgh Athletic	David McGlynn	Resigned	6 September 2014	5th	Stevie McLeish	2 October 2014
Ballingry Rovers	Lee Dair	Resigned	1 October 2014	6th	Willie Garner	6 October 2014
Broxburn Athletic	Steve Pittman	Resigned	12 April 2015	6th	Max Christie	12 April 2015

== League table ==
Pos	Team	Pld	W	D	L	GF	GA	GD	Pts	Qualification or relegation
1	Kelty Hearts (C)	28	20	5	3	63	23	+40	65	Qualification for 2015–16 Scottish Cup
2	Bo'ness United	28	18	5	5	55	21	+34	59	
3	Linlithgow Rose	28	17	5	6	65	36	+29	56	
4	Newtongrange Star	28	16	7	5	52	29	+23	55	
5	Sauchie Juniors	28	12	8	8	46	48	−2	44	
6	Penicuik Athletic	28	11	7	10	41	43	−2	40	
7	Bonnyrigg Rose Athletic	28	11	4	13	50	48	+2	37	
8	Broxburn Athletic	28	8	12	8	39	42	−3	36	
9	Hill of Beath Hawthorn	28	10	4	14	47	50	−3	34	
10	Fauldhouse United	28	8	9	11	46	52	−6	33	
11	Musselburgh Athletic	28	9	6	13	53	60	−7	33	
12	Camelon Juniors	28	9	4	15	38	58	−20	31	
13	Carnoustie Panmure	28	5	7	16	33	56	−23	22	
14	Armadale Thistle (R)	28	5	6	17	36	61	−25	21	Qualification for East Region League play-off
15	Lochee United (R)	28	4	5	19	40	77	−37	17	Relegation to East Premier League
16	Ballingry Rovers	0	0	0	0	0	0	0	0 (Note: Ballingry Rovers resigned from the league and folded on 25 November 2014 and. Their record (Pld13 W3 D1 L9 GF11 GA31 Pts10) was expunged.)	Club folded, record expunged

Source: East Region SJFA
Rules for classification: 1) points; 2) goal difference; 3) number of goals scored.
(C) Champions; (R) Relegated

== Results ==
Home \ Away	ARM	BLL	BNS	BRG	BRX	CAM	CAR	FAU	HOB	KEL	LTH	LOC	MUS	NEW	PEN	SCH
Armadale Thistle			0–2	2–1	3–1	0–2	1–2	1–2	2–1	0–4	1–1	1–1	2–3	1–1	2–3	0–4
Ballingry Rovers																
Bo'ness United	3–0			2–0	3–0	3–2	1–0	3–0	1–2	1–0	2–1	4–0	3–0	2–3	2–2	7–0
Bonnyrigg Rose Athletic	4–2		0–2		0–1	3–1	4–1	2–1	2–2	0–1	1–2	3–1	2–3	2–0	2–0	2–3
Broxburn Athletic	1–0		0–2	2–3		0–0	0–0	1–1	4–0	3–3	0–2	2–2	5–3	1–1	1–1	2–2
Camelon Juniors	3–0		1–1	2–1	2–1		0–0	5–2	0–1	1–3	1–4	3–2	2–2	0–3	2–3	3–0
Carnoustie Panmure	2–2		0–1	2–2	1–3	4–1		2–1	0–4	0–2	2–3	0–2	1–1	0–1	0–1	2–2
Fauldhouse United	0–0		0–0	2–3	2–2	4–0	3–2		2–1	0–0	2–2	3–2	3–1	2–4	2–0	0–3
Hill of Beath Hawthorn	2–1		1–0	2–2	0–1	4–1	2–3	3–3		1–2	2–4	3–1	5–2	1–3	0–1	0–2
Kelty Hearts	1–2		0–2	3–1	4–1	3–0	4–1	2–1	2–1		1–0	6–1	4–1	3–1	0–0	3–0
Linlithgow Rose	4–0		0–2	0–3	1–1	2–1	5–2	2–1	2–2	1–3		4–1	2–1	1–1	1–2	5–0
Lochee United	0–4		5–2	3–4	2–2	0–1	1–2	2–3	1–2	1–1	1–5		1–1	2–5	1–5	1–2
Musselburgh Athletic	5–4		2–3	4–1	2–0	5–1	3–2	3–1	2–1	1–2	1–2	1–2		1–4	2–2	2–2
Newtongrange Star	0–0		2–1	1–1	0–1	3–1	2–2	2–2	2–0	0–1	0–3	3–0	1–0		2–1	2–0
Penicuik Athletic	5–4		0–0	1–0	0–1	3–0	3–0	2–1	0–2	1–4	1–3	1–3	1–1	0–3		2–4
Sauchie Juniors	3–1		0–0	2–1	2–2	1–2	1–0	2–2	4–2	1–1	1–3	4–1	1–0	0–2	0–0	

Updated to match(es) played on 3 June 2015. Source: East Region SJFA
Legend: Blue = home team win; Yellow = draw; Red = away team win.

=== East Region Super/Premier League play-off ===
Broughty Athletic, who finished third in the East Premier League, defeated Armadale Thistle on penalty kicks after drawing 5–5 on aggregate in the East Region Super/Premier League play-off to gain promotion.

6 June 2015
14:30

Broughty Athletic	1–2	Armadale Thistle

Whitton Park, Broughty Ferry
Referee: Mike Roncone
10 June 2015
19:30

Armadale Thistle	3–4	Broughty Athletic
Penalties
	5–6

Volunteer Park, Armadale
Referee: Duncan Smith
