= 2012–13 East Superleague =

McBookie.com East Superleague
- Season: 2012–13
- Dates: 1 September 2012 – 15 June 2013
- Champions: Linlithgow Rose
- Matches: 132
- Goals: 463 (3.51 per match)
- Biggest home win: Linlithgow Rose 7–0 Lochee United (27 April 2013)
- Biggest away win: St Andrews United 1–6 Bo'ness United (6 October 2012)
- Highest scoring: Musselburgh Athletic 5–4 Lochee United (18 May 2013)
- Longest winning run: (11) Linlithgow Rose; 10 November 2012 – 11 May 2013
- Longest unbeaten run: (22) Linlithgow Rose whole season undefeated
- Longest losing run: (8) St Andrews United; 2 May 2013 – season end

The 2012–13 East Superleague (known as the McBookie.com East Superleague for sponsorship reasons) was the 11th season of the East Superleague, the top tier of league competition for SJFA East Region member clubs.

The season began on 1 September 2012 and ended on 15 June 2013. Bonnyrigg Rose Athletic were the reigning champions.

There was no relegation this season as the Superleague expanded from twelve to sixteen in 2013–14.

Linlithgow Rose won the title on 27 April 2013, becoming the first club to win the East Superleague on three occasions, and also becoming the first team to go the full season unbeaten in the league. As champions they entered the First Round of the 2013–14 Scottish Cup.

== Teams ==
=== To East Superleague ===
Promoted from East Premier League

- Sauchie Juniors
- Broxburn Athletic

=== From East Superleague ===
Relegated to East Premier League

- Bathgate Thistle

In abeyance

- Forfar West End

=== Stadia and locations ===
Club	Location	Ground	Manager	Finishing position 2011–12
Bo'ness United	Bo'ness	Newtown Park	Allan McGonigal	4th
Bonnyrigg Rose Athletic	Bonnyrigg	New Dundas Park	Max Christie	Champions
Broxburn Athletic	Broxburn	Albyn Park	Steve Pittman	East Premier League, 2nd
Camelon Juniors	Camelon	Carmuirs Park	Danny Smith	6th
Carnoustie Panmure	Carnoustie	Laing Park	Alan McSkimming	10th
Hill of Beath Hawthorn	Hill of Beath	Keirs Park	Jock Finlayson	2nd
Kelty Hearts	Kelty	Central Park	Willie Newbigging	5th
Linlithgow Rose	Linlithgow	Prestonfield	Mark Bradley	3rd
Lochee United	Dundee	Thomson Park	Paul Ritchie	7th
Musselburgh Athletic	Musselburgh	Olivebank Stadium	David McGlynn	8th
St Andrews United	St Andrews	Recreation Park	Jim Hardie	9th
Sauchie Juniors	Sauchie	Beechwood Park	Fraser Duncan	East Premier League, 1st

=== Managerial changes ===
Club	Outgoing manager	Manner of departure	Date of vacancy	Position in table	Incoming manager	Date of appointment
Bo'ness United	Paul Ronald	Sacked	2 September 2012	11th	Allan McGonigal	29 October 2012
Carnoustie Panmure	Ian Gilzean	Left by mutual consent	9 March 2013	9th	Alan McSkimming	9 May 2013
Kelty Hearts	Keith Burgess	Resigned	31 May 2013	5th	Willie Newbigging	2 June 2013
Lochee United	Paul Ritchie	Resigned	End of season	10th	Steven Leahy	7 June 2013

== League table ==
Pos	Team	Pld	W	D	L	GF	GA	GD	Pts	Qualification
1	Linlithgow Rose (C)	22	19	3	0	59	15	+44	60	Qualification for 2013–14 Scottish Cup
2	Bonnyrigg Rose Athletic	22	12	5	5	58	36	+22	41	
3	Camelon Juniors	22	12	3	7	50	39	+11	39	
4	Bo'ness United	22	11	5	6	44	32	+12	38	
5	Kelty Hearts	22	8	4	10	33	33	0	28	
6	Broxburn Athletic	22	8	4	10	31	32	−1	28	
7	Musselburgh Athletic	22	8	3	11	32	37	−5	27	
8	Hill of Beath Hawthorn	22	7	5	10	38	38	0	26	
9	Carnoustie Panmure	22	8	2	12	33	52	−19	26	
10	Lochee United	22	7	4	11	33	51	−18	25	
11	Sauchie Juniors	22	6	6	10	27	31	−4	24	
12	St Andrews United	22	3	2	17	24	66	−42	11	

Source: East Region SJFA
Rules for classification: 1) points; 2) goal difference; 3) number of goals scored.
(C) Champions

== Results ==
Home \ Away	BNS	BRG	BRX	CAM	CAR	HOB	KEL	LTH	LOC	MUS	STA	SCH
Bo'ness United		4–2	2–0	2–1	3–0	3–1	1–2	0–0	2–2	1–0	3–0	1–1
Bonnyrigg Rose Athletic	3–1		2–1	2–4	5–3	2–2	3–2	1–2	5–1	4–0	4–0	2–2
Broxburn Athletic	3–0	2–2		3–1	3–1	3–0	1–0	0–1	2–0	1–3	1–2	1–0
Camelon Juniors	0–4	3–1	1–1		2–2	2–1	5–1	0–2	3–2	2–1	6–1	2–0
Carnoustie Panmure	5–1	1–2	1–3	2–1		3–2	1–0	0–2	3–2	0–5	1–0	1–3
Hill of Beath Hawthorn	1–2	3–5	5–1	2–1	6–2		2–2	0–2	4–0	0–1	1–3	2–1
Kelty Hearts	1–2	0–3	1–1	1–2	2–1	0–0		1–2	1–2	4–0	4–2	2–1
Linlithgow Rose	3–2	2–2	2–0	4–3	2–0	4–1	1–1		7–0	2–0	4–1	3–0
Lochee United	4–2	2–4	1–0	1–1	1–2	0–0	1–2	2–5		1–1	2–1	2–0
Musselburgh Athletic	1–1	1–0	2–2	2–3	1–2	1–2	1–0	0–4	5–4		4–1	1–2
St Andrews United	1–6	0–4	2–1	2–4	2–2	0–3	0–2	1–4	1–2	0–2		2–2
Sauchie Juniors	1–1	0–0	3–1	2–3	4–0	0–0	1–4	0–1	0–1	1–0	4–2	

Updated to match(es) played on 15 June 2013. Source: East Region SJFA
Legend: Blue = home team win; Yellow = draw; Red = away team win.
