= Jimmy Crease =

Scottish footballer and manager

Personal information
- Full name: James Crease
- Date of birth: 17 January 1950 (age 76)
- Position: Forward

Senior career*
| Years | Team | Apps | (Gls) |
- Bonnyrigg Rose Athletic
| 1970–1972 | Berwick Rangers | 39 | (12) |
| 1972 | Albion Rovers | 1 | (0) |
- Arniston Rangers

Managerial career
- 1984–?: Linlithgow Rose
- 1992–1994: Berwick Rangers
- 1995: Albion Rovers
- 1998–?: Fauldhouse United
- 2007: Berwick Rangers (caretaker)
- 2008: Berwick Rangers (caretaker)
- 2008–2011: Berwick Rangers
- 2017: Linlithgow Rose (caretaker)
- 2019: Linlithgow Rose (caretaker)
- * Club domestic league appearances and goals

James Crease (born 17 January 1950) is a Scottish football manager and former player.

Crease played for Berwick Rangers and Albion Rovers in the Scottish Football League. He has since managed Albion Rovers, Arniston Rangers, Fauldhouse United, Linlithgow Rose and he has had four spells as manager of Berwick Rangers.

Crease first managed Berwick between 1992 and 1994. He then managed Albion Rovers, but resigned from that position in December 1995. Following a spell managing Junior teams in the East of Scotland Junior League, he returned to Berwick in 2005 as general manager. Following the resignation of John Coughlin in October 2007, Michael Renwick in April 2008 and Alan McGonigal in November 2008, he acted as caretaker manager. Following the resignation of McGonigall he said that he would only act as a caretaker but it was announced on 20 December 2008 that he would retain the managers position until the end of the 2008–09 season. Berwick reached the fourth round of the 2010–11 Scottish Cup, where they lost 2–0 to eventual winners Celtic. They also defeated Partick Thistle in the 2011–12 Scottish League Cup, but Crease left the club in October 2011 after Berwick was beaten in a 2011–12 Scottish Cup tie by Deveronvale.

Crease has twice returned to Linlithgow Rose as a caretaker manager, following the sackings of Todd Lumsden in May 2017 and Mark Bradley in October 2019.
