= Conor Scullion =

Scottish footballer

Personal information
- Date of birth: 20 March 1999 (age 27)
- Place of birth: Cambuslang, Scotland
- Position: Midfielder

Team information
- Current team: Albion Rovers

Youth career
- Hamilton Academical

Senior career*
Years	Team	Apps	(Gls)
2016-2017	Hamilton Academical	0	(0)
2016-2017	→ Airdrieonians (loan)	9	(0)
2017	→ Bo'ness United (loan)		
2018	Albion Rovers	9	(0)
2018-2019	Cumbernauld United		
2019-2020	Dumbarton	11	(0)
2020-2022	Fauldhouse United		
2023–2024	Clyde	6	(0)
2024–	Albion Rovers	4	(0)
- * Club domestic league appearances and goals as of 21 December 2024

Conor Scullion (born 20 March 1999) is a Scottish professional footballer who plays as a midfielder for Lowland League West club Albion Rovers.

== Club career ==
Scullion began his career in the youth academy of Hamilton Academical. He joined Airdrieonians on loan in 2016, making nine league appearances for the Diamonds. He spent the rest of the 2016–17 season on loan at Bo'ness United.

He left the Accies at the end of the 2016–17 season before signing for Albion Rovers in a short-term deal until the end of the 2017–18 season, making nine league appearances for the Wee Rovers.

The midfielder signed for Cumbernauld United in 2018 and became a key figure for the side who finished fourth in the SJFA West Region Championship. This form earned him a move to Scottish Professional Football League side Dumbarton in 2019.

Regular football at the Sons was hard to come by for Scullion and he left the club in 2020 after 11 league appearances, scoring once. Later that year, he signed for Fauldhouse United where he played for one season before departing the club.

Scullion appeared as a trialist for Whitburn in May 2023 against Thornton Hibs, scoring in the match.

He signed for Clyde in July 2023, where he spent a season at the club alongside brother Liam Scullion. He then joined Albion Rovers in September 2024.

== Personal life ==
He is the brother of Clyde footballer Liam Scullion. During the 2023-2024 season they played together at Clyde before Conor was released at the end of the season by the Bully Wee club after one season with the club.
