= Liam Scullion =

Scottish footballer (born 2001)

Personal information
- Date of birth: 7 October 2001 (age 25)
- Place of birth: Cambuslang, Scotland
- Position: Midfielder

Team information
- Current team: Elgin City

Youth career
- Hamilton Academical

Senior career*
Years	Team	Apps	(Gls)
2019–2020	Hamilton Academical	0	(0)
2019–2020	→ Stenhousemuir (loan)	11	(0)
2020	→ East Kilbride (loan)		
2020–2022	Fauldhouse United		
2022–2026	Clyde	87	(12)
2026–	Elgin City	2	(0)
- * Club domestic league appearances and goals

Liam Scullion (born 7 October 2001) is a Scottish professional footballer who plays as a midfielder for Scottish League Two club Elgin City.

== Club career ==
Scullion began his career in the youth academy of Hamilton Academical. He joined Stenhousemuir on loan in 2019 and made his professional league debut on 3 August in a 3–2 defeat to Albion Rovers. Scullion had a loan spell at East Kilbride in 2020, before leaving the Accies that summer.

After his departure from New Douglas Park, he joined Fauldhouse United in 2020. His good form for the Hoose earned Scullion a move to Scottish Professional Football League side Clyde in 2022. He made his league debut for the Bully Wee on 30 July 2022 in a 4–1 win over Queen of the South.

On 29 June 2026, Scullion signed for Scottish League Two side Elgin City.

== Personal life ==
He is the brother of Conor Scullion and were teammates at Clyde during the 2023-24 season.
