= Eamon Fullerton =

Scottish Footballer

Personal information
- Date of birth: 19 March 1985 (age 41)
- Place of birth: Banknock, Scotland
- Position: Defender

Senior career*
Years	Team	Apps	(Gls)
2003–2005	Livingston	0	(0)
2004	→ Raith Rovers (loan)	10	(0)
2005–2007	Kelty Hearts		
2007–2009	Bo'ness United		
2009–2018	Camelon		
- * Club domestic league appearances and goals

Eamon Fullerton (born 19 March 1985) is a Scottish former professional footballer who played as a defender for Livingston, Raith Rovers, Kelty Hearts, Bo'ness United and Camelon.

== Club career ==
Fullerton came through the Livingston youth system but did not make any first team appearances. In early 2005, He had a short spell on loan at Raith Rovers, playing in 10 fixtures, before being released.

The defender spent the latter part of his career playing in the East Region Juniors with Kelty Hearts, Bo'ness United and Camelon.

== Coaching career ==
After retiring from playing, Fullerton joined the coaching staff at Camelon.

Fullerton joined the coaching staff at Linlithgow Rose in August 2021.
