= Matthew Falconer =

Scottish footballer

Personal information
- Date of birth: 23 February 2007 (age 19)
- Place of birth: Scotland
- Position: Central midfielder

Team information
- Current team: Kelty Hearts (on loan from Partick Thistle)
- Number: 17

Youth career
- Partick Thistle

Senior career*
Years	Team	Apps	(Gls)
2024—	Partick Thistle	3	(0)
2025–2026	→ Linlithgow Rose (loan)	7	(0)
2026–	→ Kelty Hearts (loan)	9	(0)
- * Club domestic league appearances and goals as of 18:41, 21 November 2026 (UTC)

Matthew “Matty” Falconer (born 23 February 2007) is a Scottish professional footballer who plays as a midfielder for Scottish League Two club Kelty Hearts on loan from Scottish Championship club Partick Thistle.

== Career ==
=== Partick Thistle ===
In October 2024, Falconer signed a two-year modern apprenticeship deal with Partick Thistle, after coming through the club's youth system.

In February 2026, Falconer made his professional debut, coming off the bench in a 1–1 draw with Airdrie in the Scottish Championship.

In September 2025, Falconer joined Lowland League club Linlithgow Rose on loan as part of a co-operation deal between the two clubs for the 2025–26 season.

Falconer signed a two-year professional contract with, the option of a further year, with Thistle in May 2026. Falconer made his breakthrough into the Thistle first team at the start of the 2026–27 season playing all four Scottish League Cup group stage games and then coming off the bench in the opening day of the Scottish Championship season in a 1–0 away win at Greenock Morton.

In September 2026, Falconer joined Scottish League Two side Kelty Hearts on loan until January 2027.
