= Murray McDowell =

Scottish footballer and coach

Personal information
- Full name: Murray McDowell
- Date of birth: 17 February 1978 (age 48)
- Place of birth: Dundee, Scotland
- Position: Forward

Youth career
- North Muirton
- Scone Thistle
- Carnoustie Panmure

Senior career*
Years	Team	Apps	(Gls)
1999–2001	Cowdenbeath	60	(23)
2001	Partick Thistle	4	(0)
2001	→ Queen of the South (loan)	2	(0)
2001	Clyde	4	(0)
2001–2002	Berwick Rangers	16	(7)
2002–2003	Arbroath	19	(4)
2003	Berwick Rangers	15	(0)
2003–2004	Stenhousemuir	2	(0)
2004–2006	Carnoustie Panmure		
2006–2007	Bathgate Thistle		
2007	Tayport		
2007–2008	Kelty Hearts		
2008–2009	Linlithgow Rose		
2009–2010	Jeanfield Swifts		
2010–2012	Oakley United		
2012–2013	Ballingry Rovers		
2013	Luncarty		
2014	Kinnoull		
2014–2015	Kelty Hearts		
2015	Tayport		
2017	Fossoway AFC		

Managerial career
- 2009–2010: Jeanfield Swifts
- 2013: Luncarty
- 2014: Kinnoull
- 2016: Camelon Juniors
- 2017–2020: Kelty Hearts (fitness coach)
- 2020–2022: Dundee (fitness coach)
- * Club domestic league appearances and goals

Murray McDowell (born 17 February 1978) is a Scottish former professional footballer. He played in the Scottish Football League First Division for Partick Thistle and Clyde.

== Career ==
A striker, McDowell started his professional career at Cowdenbeath. He had an impressive time at Cowdenbeath and received offers from Hearts, Southend United and Brentford. McDowell eventually joined Partick Thistle in August 2001. Despite scoring on his debut for the Jags, he failed to make a breakthrough at the club.

After leaving Thistle, McDowell had brief spells at Queen of the South, Clyde, Arbroath and Stenhousemuir.

McDowell moved into junior football with Carnoustie Panmure in 2004 and went on to play for numerous clubs at this level including Linlithgow Rose, Tayport and Kelty Hearts. He moved into his first management role at Jeanfield Swifts in 2009 and later had spells in charge at Luncarty and Kinnoull.

McDowell is a certified personal fitness trainer, working for Good Health in Dundee.

McDowell was appointed manager of East Superleague side Camelon Juniors in June 2016 but left the post three months later.
