= Brian Fairley =

Scottish football manager (born 1959)

- Born: 18 April 1959 (age 66); Falkirk
- Occupation: Football manager

Brian Fairley (born 18 April 1959) is a Scottish former association football manager.

Fairley was born in Falkirk. His coaching career began at Whitburn Juniors before going on to manage Stenhousemuir, however after a dispute with the board over a signing he resigned in October 2001. He then took over at Scottish Junior club Bo'ness United, but controversially resigned on the eve of a Scottish Junior Cup semifinal in March 2003 to become the manager at Dumbarton, along with assistant Allan McGonigal. At the time Dumbarton were in relegation trouble in the Scottish Second Division, but with only six games to go of the season he turned fortunes around and kept the club in the league, including a 4–1 win over league winners Raith Rovers.

Fairley led the club to third place in the same league the following season in his only full season in charge. Narrowly missing out on automatic promotion on the last day of the season to second-placed Hamilton Academical by two points. Dumbarton were unable to repeat that success the following season and Fairley resigned in December 2004.

He joined league rivals Forfar Athletic, and kept the Angus club in the Scottish Second Division at the end of season 2004-05 but resigned shortly into the next season citing work and family commitments.

In May 2008 he was appointed as manager of Linlithgow Rose. He resigned from his position at the end of February 2009 following a poor run of results.

== Managerial statistics ==
As of February 2009

| Team | Nat | From | To | Record | | | | |
| Team | Nat | From | To | G | W | D | L | Win % |
|---|---|---|---|---|---|---|---|---|
| Stenhousemuir | (Scotland) | April 2000 | September 2001 | 58 | 19 | 14 | 25 | 32.76 |
| Bo'ness United | (Scotland) | 2001 | March 2003 | | | | | |
| Dumbarton | (Scotland) | March 2003 | December 2004 | 67 | 30 | 11 | 26 | 44.78 |
| Forfar Athletic | (Scotland) | December 2004 | September 2005 | 31 | 10 | 9 | 12 | 32.26 |
| Linlithgow Rose | (Scotland) | May 2008 | February 2009 | | | | | |
