= Scotland national under-19 football team =

National under-19 association football team representing Scotland

Scotland Under-19
- Association: Scottish Football Association
- Head coach: Tam Courts
- Most caps: Callum Booth (13)
- Top scorer: Alex MacDonald (7)
| First colours | Second colours |

Biggest win
- Scotland 8–0 San Marino (Tiszaújváros, Hungary; 22 October 2008)

Biggest defeat
- Netherlands 5–0 Scotland

European Under-19 Championship
- Appearances: 1 (first in 2006)
- Best result: Runners-up (2006)
Medal record
UEFA European U-19 Championship
| Silver medal – second place | 2006 Poland |

The Scotland national under-19 football team is the national football team representing Scotland for players of 19 years of age or under at the start of a European Under-19 Football Championship campaign. The team, which is controlled by the Scottish Football Association, acts as a feeder team to the Scotland national football team.

== History ==
Until 2001, the European youth championship was competed for by under-18 teams. The best performance by a Scotland under-18 team was in 1982, when they won the tournament. Beating Czechoslovakia 3–1 in the final, the team was then managed by Andy Roxburgh and Walter Smith, who would both go on to manage the senior side. Scotland defeated rivals England in the qualifying round and finished top of Group 4, which also included the Netherlands. In the semi-finals, Scotland beat Poland 2–0. Scotland also reached the semi-finals of the 1978 tournament, where they lost on penalties to Yugoslavia. Scotland topped Group two – which included Germany and Italy – to qualify for the semi-final, having beaten Denmark in the qualifying round.

During the period of the under-19 format, Scotland qualified for the finals tournament in 2006 when, under the guidance of manager Archie Gemmill and coach Tommy Wilson, they lost 2–1 to Spain in the final. This performance guaranteed Scotland's participation at the 2007 FIFA U-20 World Cup (formerly the World Youth Championships), representing their first appearance for 20 years.

Since 2006, Scotland have not progressed past the elite qualification round of the European under-19 tournaments.

== Head coaches ==
- Archie Gemmill (2005–2009)
- Billy Stark (2009–2012)
- Ricky Sbragia (2012–2015)
- Scot Gemmill (2015–2016)
- Ricky Sbragia (2016–2017)
- Donald Park (2017–2018)
- Billy Stark (2018–2024)
- Neil MacFarlane (2024–2026)
- Tam Courts (2026–present)

== Competitive record ==
=== UEFA European U-19 Championship Record ===
Champions Runners-up Third place / semi finals Fourth place Tournament held on home soil

| Year | Round | GP | W | D | L | GS | GA |
|---|---|---|---|---|---|---|---|
| Before 2002 | See Scotland national under-18 football team | | | | | | |
| (Norway) 2002 | Preliminary round | did not qualify | | | | | |
| (Liechtenstein) 2003 | First qualifying round | did not qualify | | | | | |
| (Switzerland) 2004 | Second qualifying round | did not qualify | | | | | |
| (Northern Ireland) 2005 | Elite round | did not qualify | | | | | |
| (Poland) 2006 | Runners-up | 5 | 2 | 1 | 2 | 7 | 10 |
| (Austria) 2007 | Elite round | did not qualify | | | | | |
| (Czech Republic) 2008 | First qualifying round | did not qualify | | | | | |
| (Ukraine) 2009 | Elite round | did not qualify | | | | | |
| (France) 2010 | Elite round | did not qualify | | | | | |
| (Romania) 2011 | First qualifying round | did not qualify | | | | | |
| (Estonia) 2012 | First qualifying round | did not qualify | | | | | |
| (Lithuania) 2013 | Elite round | did not qualify | | | | | |
| (Hungary) 2014 | First qualifying round | did not qualify | | | | | |
| (Greece) 2015 | Elite round | did not qualify | | | | | |
| (Germany) 2016 | Elite round | did not qualify | | | | | |
| (Georgia (country)) 2017 | Elite round | did not qualify | | | | | |
| (Finland) 2018 | Elite round | did not qualify | | | | | |
| (Armenia) 2019 | Elite round | did not qualify | | | | | |
| (Northern Ireland) 2020 | Tournament cancelled due to COVID-19 | | | | | | |
| (Romania) 2021 | Tournament cancelled due to COVID-19 | | | | | | |
| (Slovakia) 2022 | Elite round | did not qualify | | | | | |
| (Malta) 2023 | Qualifying round | did not qualify | | | | | |
| (Northern Ireland) 2024 | Elite round | did not qualify | | | | | |
| (Romania) 2025 | Qualifying round | did not qualify | | | | | |
| (Wales) 2026 | Qualifying round | did not qualify | | | | | |
| (Czech Republic) 2027 | TBD | | | | | | |
| Total | 1/20 | 5 | 2 | 1 | 2 | 7 | 10 |

Notes

- First qualifying round and Preliminary round are the same stage
- Elite round, Intermediary round and Second qualifying round are the same stage
- Draws also include penalty shootouts, regardless of the outcome.

=== Other tournaments ===
| Year | Competition | Result | GP | W | D* | L | GS | GA | Ref |
|---|---|---|---|---|---|---|---|---|---|
| (Northern Ireland) 2001 | Belfast Tournament | 1st | 2 | 2 | 0 | 0 | 5 | 2 | |
| (Northern Ireland) 2005 | Northern Irish Tournament | 2nd | 3 | 1 | 2 | 0 | 2 | 1 | |
| (Spain) 2006 | La Manga Tournament | 2nd | 3 | 1 | 2 | 0 | 3 | 2 | |
| (Spain) 2007 | La Manga Tournament | 1st | 3 | 2 | 1 | 0 | 5 | 2 | |
| (Germany) 2015 | Mercedes-Benz Cup | 2nd | 3 | 1 | 2 | 0 | 5 | 3 | |
| (Slovenia) 2022 | Slovenia Nations Cup | | | | | | | | |

== Players ==
=== Current squad ===
The following players were selected for the 2027 UEFA European Under-19 Championship qualification matches against Italy, Ireland and Poland on 25, 28 and 31 March 2026; respectively.

Clubs correct as of 18 July 2026.

| No. | Pos. | Player | Date of birth (age) | Club |
|---|---|---|---|---|
| 1 | GK | Alfie Halliwell | 24 August 2007 (age 19) | (Scottish Football Association) Albion Rovers (Note: On loan from Rangers.) |
| 12 | GK | Rydnn McGuire | 1 October 2008 (age 18) | (Scottish Football Association) Rangers |
| 18 | DF | John Tod | 16 May 2007 (age 19) | (Scottish Football Association) Dunfermline |
| | DF | Jake Vallance | 10 October 2008 (age 18) | (The Football Association) Southampton |
| 3 | DF | Matthew Gillies | 16 February 2007 (age 19) | (Scottish Football Association) Stenhousemuir (Note: On loan from Heart of Midlothian.) |
| 4 | DF | Joseph McGrath | 12 March 2007 (age 19) | (Scottish Football Association) Hibernian |
| 5 | DF | Alfie Osborne | 16 July 2008 (age 18) | (Scottish Football Association) Hearts |
| 13 | DF | Daniel Armer | 22 October 2007 (age 19) | (The Football Association) Manchester United |
| 19 | DF | Finlay Hale | 11 January 2007 (age 19) | (Scottish Football Association) Celtic |
| 2 | DF | Callan Hamill | 1 March 2009 (age 17) | (The Football Association) Arsenal |
| 15 | MF | Calum Adamson | 7 August 2007 (age 19) | (Scottish Football Association) Rangers |
| 14 | MF | Sean McArdle | 27 August 2007 (age 19) | (Scottish Football Association) Celtic |
| 7 | MF | Aidan Borland | 25 April 2007 (age 19) | (The Football Association) Aston Villa |
| 6 | MF | Samuel Isiguzo | 13 May 2007 (age 19) | (Scottish Football Association) Celtic |
| 8 | MF | Tyler Fletcher | 19 March 2007 (age 19) | (The Football Association) Manchester United |
| 10 | MF | Fletcher Boyd | 26 January 2008 (age 18) | (The Football Association) Aston Villa |
| 11 | MF | Sam Chambers | 18 August 2007 (age 19) | (The Football Association) Leeds United |
| | MF | Jack McGrath | 14 October 2008 (age 18) | (The Football Association) Aston Villa |
| 17 | FW | Lewis Stewart | 27 April 2007 (age 19) | (Scottish Football Association) Queen's Park |
| 9 | FW | Evan Mooney | 11 December 2007 (age 18) | (The Football Association) Arsenal |
| 16 | FW | Owen Stirton | 30 January 2007 (age 19) | (Scottish Football Association) Ayr United (Note: On loan from Dundee United.) |
| 20 | FW | Josh Landers | 27 February 2007 (age 19) | (The Football Association) West Ham |

=== Recent call-ups ===
The following players had also been called up within the last twelve months, and remain eligible for selection.

| Pos. | Player | Date of birth (age) | Caps | Goals | Club | Latest call-up |
|---|---|---|---|---|---|---|
| DF | Scott Constable | 22 August 2007 (age 19) | 0 | 0 | (Scotland) Dundee United | v. Italy, 13 October 2025 |
| DF | Rory Whittaker | 10 August 2007 (age 19) | 0 | 0 | (England) Southampton | v. Italy, 13 October 2025 |
| DF | Lewis Gillie | 9 June 2008 (age 18) | 0 | 0 | (Scotland) Stranraer (Note: On loan from Hibernian.) | v. United Arab Emirates, 9 September 2025 |
| DF | James Overy | 9 November 2007 (age 19) | 0 | 0 | (England) Manchester United | v. United Arab Emirates, 9 September 2025 |
| DF | Callum Penman | 5 May 2007 (age 19) | 0 | 0 | (Scotland) Stenhousemuir (Note: On loan from St Mirren.) | v. United Arab Emirates, 9 September 2025 |
| MF | Archie Traynor | 9 June 2008 (age 18) | 0 | 0 | (Scotland) Stranraer (Note: On loan from Kilmarnock.) | v. Italy, 13 October 2025 |
| MF | Cooper Masson | 10 November 2008 (age 18) | 0 | 0 | (Scotland) Aberdeen | v. United Arab Emirates, 9 September 2025 |
| MF | Aiden McCallion | 15 June 2008 (age 18) | 0 | 0 | (Scotland) Queen's Park | v. United Arab Emirates, 9 September 2025 |
| MF | Gus Stevenson | 30 January 2007 (age 19) | 0 | 0 | (Scotland) Stenhousemuir | v. United Arab Emirates, 9 September 2025 |
| FW | Caelan Cadamarteri | 3 November 2009 (age 17) | 2 | 1 | (England) Manchester City | v. Italy, 13 October 2025 |
| FW | Aiden McGinlay | 5 March 2007 (age 19) | 0 | 0 | (Scotland) Queen's Park | v. Italy, 13 October 2025 |
