= Brian McNaughton (footballer) =

Scottish footballer and manager

Personal information
- Date of birth: 22 January 1963 (age 63)
- Place of birth: Edinburgh, Scotland
- Position: Forward

Youth career
- Winchburgh Albion

Senior career*
Years	Team	Apps	(Gls)
- Broxburn Athletic
1984–1986	Heart of Midlothian	12	(2)
1986–1989	East Fife	73	(29)
1989	Forfar Athletic	14	(4)
1989–1992	Meadowbank Thistle	40	(9)
1992–1993	Arbroath	43	(10)
1993–1996	Whitburn		
1999–2000	Whitburn		
Total		182	(54)

Managerial career
- 1994–1996: Whitburn
- 1999–2000: Whitburn
- 2000–2001: Linlithgow Rose
- 2005–2010: Arniston Rangers
- 2017–2020: Broxburn Athletic
- * Club domestic league appearances and goals

Brian McNaughton (born 22 January 1963) is a Scottish retired footballer, who played as a forward for Heart of Midlothian in the Scottish Football League Premier Division. He was most recently the manager of Broxburn Athletic in the Scottish Junior Football Association, East Region.
