= Tam Courts =

Scottish footballer and manager

Personal information
- Date of birth: 10 August 1981 (age 45)
- Place of birth: Kirkcaldy, Scotland
- Position: Full back

Youth career
- Lochgelly Albert Colts, Milton Green

Senior career*
Years	Team	Apps	(Gls)
1998–2002	Livingston	5	(0)
2000–2001	→ Cowdenbeath (loan)	25	(1)
2002–2004	Kelty Hearts		
2004–2006	Hill of Beath Hawthorn		
2006–2007	East Fife	26	(0)
2007	→ Hill of Beath Hawthorn (loan)		
2007–2018	Kelty Hearts		
Total		56	(1)

Managerial career
- 2013–2018: Kelty Hearts
- 2021–2022: Dundee United
- 2022: Budapest Honvéd
- 2026–: Scotland U-19s
- * Club domestic league appearances and goals

Thomas "Tam" Courts (born 10 August 1981) is a Scottish football coach and former player and current head coach of Scotland U-19s

As a player, he appeared in the Scottish Football League for Livingston, Cowdenbeath and East Fife. After a previous spell at the club from 2002 to 2004, he rejoined Kelty Hearts as a player in 2007 and went on to be their player-manager from 2013 until 2018. After joining Dundee United in 2020 to work in their youth academy, he was their head coach during the 2021–22 season.

== Playing career ==
Courts began his professional career at Livingston and made his first team debut in February 1999 against Clyde in a Scottish Football League Second Division game. With Livingston promoted as champions that year, Courts made four league appearances in the First Division the following season before departing for a loan spell at Cowdenbeath.

Courts dropped into Junior football with local Fife sides Kelty Hearts and Hill of Beath Hawthorn after his release by Livingston in 2002. A further spell in senior football with East Fife in 2006–07 ended with Courts being loaned back to Hill of Beath before joining Kelty for a second time in late 2007.

Courts has also played for the Scotland Junior international team and captained the squad in the 2013 Umbro Quadrangular Trophy in the Republic of Ireland.

== Coaching career ==
=== Kelty Hearts ===
After the sacking of Willie Newbigging in October 2013, Courts was appointed player-manager of Kelty Hearts at the age of 32. He saved the club from relegation before winning the East Region Super League title for the first time in the club's history in 2015. Kelty went onto win the title again in 2017 before joining the East of Scotland Football League.

Kelty won the East of Scotland League in 2018 under Courts and were promoted to the Lowland League, the fifth tier of the Scottish football league system, where they competed for the first time during the 2018–19 season.

Courts retired from playing to focus on managing Kelty Hearts in the Lowland League, however he resigned his position as manager on the 11 October 2018, which the club reluctantly accepted.

=== Dundee United ===
Courts joined Dundee United in February 2020 as head of tactical performance in the club's youth academy. In December 2020 he was put in temporary charge of the club's first team when manager Micky Mellon and his coaching staff had to self-isolate during the COVID-19 pandemic, overseeing a 2-0 defeat against Livingston. In June 2021 Courts was appointed as the club's head coach following the departure of Mellon.

Courts guided United to a fourth-place finish, and European qualification, in the 2021–22 Scottish Premiership. He was linked with Croatian club HNK Rijeka in June 2022 and soon afterwards left United by mutual consent, as he had expressed his "desire to explore other options".

=== Budapest Honvéd ===
After his departure from Dundee United, Courts signed a two-year deal to become the new manager of Budapest Honvéd. In an interview with Hungarian Nemzeti Sport, he said that the first match he saw in a stadium was between Celtic and Honvéd. He also added that the fact that Chris Docherty was appointed as the sports director of Honvéd contributed to his decision to accept the offer of Honvéd.

On 21 August 2022, Courts-led Honvéd won for the first time in the 2022-23 Nemzeti Bajnokság I season by beating Vasas SC 2-1 at Illovszky Rudolf Stadion.

Although his team defeated Zalaegerszegi TE at the ZTE Arena on 22 October 2022 on the 12th match day of the season, Courts left the club by mutual consent on 24 October 2022. He then took an extended period away from management while completing his UEFA Pro Licence qualification.

=== Scotland ===
In September 2026, Courts was appointed the new head coach of the Scotland U-19s.

== Managerial record ==
As of 13 November 2022

Managerial record by team and tenure
Team	Nat	From	To	Record					Ref.
Team	Nat	From	To	G	W	D	L	Win %	Ref.
Kelty Hearts	(Scotland)	2 October 2013	11 October 2018	192	128	27	37	66.67	
Dundee United	(Scotland)	7 June 2021	14 June 2022	47	18	13	16	38.30	
Budapest Honvéd	(Hungary)	15 June 2022	24 October 2022	18	6	4	8	33.33	
Total				255	151	43	61	59.22	—

== Honours ==
=== Player ===
Cowdenbeath

- Scottish Third Division: Promotion 2000–01

=== Manager ===
Kelty Hearts

- East of Scotland League: 2017–18
- King Cup: 2017–18
- East Junior Super League: 2014–15, 2016–17
