= Jon Connolly =

Scottish footballer

Personal information
- Date of birth: 3 April 1981 (age 45)
- Place of birth: Glasgow, Scotland
- Position: Goalkeeper

Team information
- Current team: Raith Rovers (Goalkeeper Coach)

Youth career
- St Johnstone
- –1998: Ipswich Town

Senior career*
Years	Team	Apps	(Gls)
1998	Albion Rovers	8	(0)
1998–2000	Thorniewood United		
2000	→ Stenhousemuir (trial)	1	(0)
2000–2001	Motherwell	2	(0)
2002	Dumbarton	2	(0)
2002–2003	Cumnock Juniors		
2003–2004	East Stirlingshire	19	(0)
2004	Dunipace Juniors		
2004–2005	Linlithgow Rose		
2005–2006	Dunipace Juniors		
2006	Larkhall Thistle		
2006–2007	Bo'ness United		
2007–2008	Fauldhouse United		
2008–2010	Cambuslang Rangers		
2010–2011	St. Anthony's		
2011	Kirkintilloch Rob Roy		
2011–2013	Thorniewood United		
2013	→ St. Anthony's (loan)		
2013–2014	Kilwinning Rangers		
2014	Kirkintilloch Rob Roy		
2014–2016	Vale of Clyde		
2016	Rossvale		
2016	St. Anthony's		
2016–	Fauldhouse United		

Managerial career
- 2017–2020: Fauldhouse United
- * Club domestic league appearances and goals as of 19:53, 21 February 2017 (UTC)

Jon Connolly (born 3 April 1981) is a Scottish football goalkeeper and is currently the goalkeeping coach at Raith Rovers. Connolly has previously played in the Scottish Premier League for Motherwell.

== Career ==
Connolly began his senior career in the academy system at Ipswich Town but returned to Scotland to sign for Albion Rovers in February 1998, making eight league appearances in the Scottish Football League Third Division before the end of the season. After leaving Rovers, he dropped to Junior level with Thorniewood United before being signed by manager Billy Davies for Motherwell in the summer of 2000.

With Motherwell releasing a number of high-earning first team players including Andy Goram, Connolly found himself as a second choice keeper at Fir Park behind Stevie Woods. He made his Scottish Premier League debut in April 2001 against Dundee United at Tannadice and retained his place in the team for the following weeks match against Aberdeen.

These proved to be his only first team appearances for Motherwell and Connolly left the club on the eve of the January 2002 transfer window, signing for Dumbarton until the end of the season. A year at Cumnock Juniors was followed by another Scottish Football League spell with East Stirlingshire in 2003–04 where he made nineteen league appearances.

After leaving the Shire, Connolly has enjoyed a peripatetic career in Junior football. In recent years, he joined Kilwinning Rangers in May 2013 before moving on to Kirkintilloch Rob Roy in January 2014. Connolly signed for Vale of Clyde in the summer of 2014 and had short stints at Rossvale and St. Anthony's before joining East Superleague side Fauldhouse United in October 2016.

Connolly was appointed as player-manager of Fauldhouse in February 2017.

Big JC is now seen playing Over 35 football for Lanarkshire Forest, in the Central Over 35s league. Forest has successfully won Division 1A of the 2023 season, securing promotion to the Premier Division for 2024. Jon is current the first team goalkeeper coach at Raith Rovers who are based in Kirkcaldy.
