= 2017–18 East of Scotland Football League =

East of Scotland Football League
- Season: 2017–18
- Dates: 12 August 2017 – 12 May 2018
- Champions: Kelty Hearts
- Promoted: Kelty Hearts
- Matches: 156
- Goals: 823 (5.28 per match)
- Top goalscorer: Stuart Cargill (31 goals); Kelty Hearts
- Biggest home win: Kelty Hearts 12–1 Peebles Rovers (24 February 2018)
- Biggest away win: Eyemouth United 0–13 Kelty Hearts (14 October 2017)
- Highest scoring: Eyemouth United 0–13 Kelty Hearts (14 October 2017); Burntisland Shipyard 10–3 Eyemouth United (10 February 2018); Kelty Hearts 12–1 Peebles Rovers (24 February 2018)
- Longest winning run: 22 matches: Kelty Hearts
- Longest unbeaten run: 23 matches: Lothian Thistle Hutchison Vale
- Longest winless run: 22 matches: Tweedmouth Rangers
- Longest losing run: 19 matches: Tweedmouth Rangers
- Highest attendance: 1,400; Kelty Hearts 3–1 Lothian Thistle Hutchison Vale (28 April 2018)
- All statistics correct as of 12 May 2017.

The 2017–18 East of Scotland Football League (known for sponsorship reasons as the Central Taxis East of Scotland League) was the 89th season of the East of Scotland Football League, and the 4th season as the sixth tier of the Scottish football pyramid system. The season began on 12 August 2017 and ended on 12 May 2018. Lothian Thistle Hutchison Vale were the defending champions.

The league was increased to a 13-team division as Kelty Hearts applied to switch from the SJFA East Region Super League and Preston Athletic were relegated from the Lowland League.

Kelty Hearts were crowned champions on 28 April 2018, after a 3–1 win over Lothian Thistle Hutchison Vale in their final match. They secured promotion to the Lowland League after defeating South of Scotland Football League winners Threave Rovers 10–0 on aggregate. This was the first time that the Lowland League play-off had taken place.

== Teams ==
Location of teams in 2017–18 East of Scotland Football League

The following teams have changed division since the 2016–17 season.

=== To East of Scotland Football League ===
Relegated from Lowland Football League

- Preston Athletic

Transferred from East Superleague

- Kelty Hearts

Team	Location	Home ground	Capacity	Seats	Floodlit	Ref.
Burntisland Shipyard ^{[SFA]}	Burntisland	Recreation Park	1,000	0	No	
Coldstream ^{[SFA]}	Coldstream	Home Park	1,000	0	No	
Eyemouth United	Eyemouth	Warner Park	500	0	No	
Heriot-Watt University	Edinburgh	Riccarton Campus	200	0	No	
Kelty Hearts ^{[SFA]}	Kelty	New Central Park	3,000	0	Yes	
Leith Athletic	Edinburgh	Peffermill 3G	500	0	Yes	
Lothian Thistle Hutchison Vale	Edinburgh	Saughton Sports Complex	1,000	0	Yes	
Ormiston	Ormiston	Recreation Park	2,000	0	No	
Peebles Rovers	Peebles	Whitestone Park	2,250	250	No	
Preston Athletic ^{[SFA]}	Prestonpans	Pennypit Park	1,500	313	Yes	
Stirling University Reserves	Stirling	Gannochy Sports Centre	1,000	0	Yes	
Tweedmouth Rangers	Berwick-upon-Tweed	Old Shielfield	1,000	0	No	
Tynecastle	Edinburgh	Saughton Sports Complex	1,000	0	Yes	

^{SFA} Club has an SFA Licence (as of 20 December 2017) and are eligible to participate in the Lowland League promotion play-off should they win the league.

== League table ==
Pos	Team	Pld	W	D	L	GF	GA	GD	Pts	Promotion or qualification
1	Kelty Hearts (C, O, P)	24	23	0	1	143	12	+131	69	Qualification for Lowland League play-off
2	Lothian Thistle Hutchison Vale	24	22	1	1	97	20	+77	67	
3	Preston Athletic	24	16	3	5	74	36	+38	51	
4	Leith Athletic	24	15	4	5	80	41	+39	49	
5	Tynecastle	24	13	0	11	79	48	+31	39	
6	Heriot-Watt University	24	11	6	7	59	53	+6	39	
7	Peebles Rovers	24	12	2	10	59	73	−14	38	
8	Burntisland Shipyard	24	8	1	15	52	69	−17	25	
9	Stirling University Reserves	24	6	6	12	48	73	−25	24	
10	Coldstream	24	5	3	16	52	79	−27	18	
11	Eyemouth United	24	6	0	18	44	114	−70	18	
12	Ormiston	24	3	3	18	17	68	−51	12	
13	Tweedmouth Rangers	24	1	1	22	21	139	−118	4	

Source: East of Scotland Football League
Rules for classification: 1) Points; 2) Goal difference; 3) Number of goals scored
(C) Champions; (O) Play-off winners; (P) Promoted
