= Whitburn F.C. =

Association football club in Scotland

- Full name: Whitburn Football Club
- Nickname: The Burnie
- Founded: 1930 as Whitburn Amateurs, turned Junior c. June 1934
- Ground: Central Park; East Main Street; Whitburn
- Capacity: 4,000
- Coordinates: 55°51′58″N 3°40′58″W
- Manager: Scott Woodhouse
- League: East of Scotland League Premier Division
- 2025–25: East of Scotland League Premier Division, 12th of 16
Home colours	Away colours

Whitburn Football Club are a Scottish football club based in Whitburn, West Lothian. They play their home games at Central Park and currently compete in the East of Scotland League Premier Division

== History ==
Formed on 31 May 1930 as Whitburn Amateurs F.C., they turned Junior over the summer months of 1934.

Nicknamed The Burnie, the club's colours are claret and amber. The club have won the Scottish Junior Cup on one occasion, defeating Johnstone Burgh on penalties in the 1999–00 final, as well as being runners up on two other occasions losing to Bonnyrigg Rose in 1966, and to Camelon in 1995.

Whitburn moved to the East of Scotland Football League and joined the bottom tier ahead of the 2021–22 season. They won back-to-back titles in Conference X and then the Second Division, followed by a third successive promotion by a securing their spot in the Premier Division for 2024–25.

After victories in the Alex Jack Cup and Victory Shield in 2024-25 they qualified for the preliminary round of the Scottish Cup for the first time. On August 9, 2025 Whitburn defeated Scottish Amateur Cup winners Stein Thistle AFC 3.2 to qualify for the 2nd preliminary round were they will take on Scottish Junior Cup winners Johnstone Burgh for a place in the first round proper.

In 1997-98 season, the side managed by Brian Fairley managed to win 4 trophies in what was a very successful season which also saw 8 players capped for Scotland juniors.

Brian McNaughton was the manager when Whitburn finally lifted the Scottish Cup at the third attempt in May 2000 with Stevie Prior the heroic goalscorer. The team was also managed from 2014 to 2016 by former St Mirren boss Tom Hendrie.

In season 2021-22, Whitburn joined the East of Scotland Senior League, starting in the bottom tier along with the remaining Junior clubs who had resisted the exodus, and Junior football was no more although the club kept the Juniors part in their official name.

After two league title victories in a row, Whitburn find themselves in the East of Scotland Premier Division just below the Lowland League and potential league football in the future.

Although he never ended up playing for the club, Rangers legend John Greig famously signed a white form with Whitburn Juniors in 1959, which allowed him to play for the club if he didn't succeed at Ibrox.

Other notable figures include internationalists like Paul Taylor and Bruce Clouston who played for the Scotland Junior team, and the legendary long-serving player Dewi Taylor who scored 73 goals in over 200 appearances and had a significant impact on the club's success.

== Club staff ==
=== Board of directors ===
Role	Name
Secretary	(Scotland) Ann Haddow
Club Official	(Scotland) Robert Cook
Club Official	(Scotland) Steven Greer

=== Coaching staff ===
Role	Name
Manager	(Scotland) Scott Woodhouse
Physio	(Scotland) Archie Gilmour
Kit man	(Scotland) Robert Haddow

== Current squad ==
As of 31 May 2024

Note: Flags indicate national team as defined under FIFA eligibility rules; some limited exceptions apply. Players may hold more than one non-FIFA nationality.

No.	Pos.	Nation	Player
—	GK	SCO	Daniel Farrell
—	GK	SCO	Blair Gallagher
—	DF	SCO	Ethan Kerr
—	DF	SCO	Stephan Murray
—	DF	SCO	Alister Croall
—	DF	SCO	Andrew Gillen
—	DF	SCO	Michael McGarahan
—	DF	SCO	Sammy Watson
—	DF	SCO	Darren Tomaszewski
—	DF	SCO	Lennon Watson

No.	Pos.	Nation	Player
—	MF	SCO	Steven Clark
—	MF	SCO	John James Henderson
—	MF	SCO	Flynn McCafferty
—	MF	SCO	Andrew Thomson
—	MF	SCO	Liam Gray
—	MF	ZIM	Mati Zata
—	FW	SCO	Ross Crawford
—	FW	SCO	Darren Liddell
—	FW	SCO	Cammy Graham
—	FW	SCO	Harrison Edwards
—	FW	SCO	Dewi Taylor

== Managerial history ==
Name	Nationality	Years
William Strickland	(Scotland)	1951-?
Colin Sinclair	(Scotland)	1986-?
George Fairley	(Scotland)	1988-?
Derek Strickland	(Scotland)	1992-94
Brian McNaughton; Keith Burgess	(Scotland)	1994-1996
Brian Fairley	(Scotland)	1996-1999
Brian McNaughton	(Scotland)	1999-2000
Derek Strickland	(Scotland)	2013-?
Derek Halcrow	(Scotland)	2009-?
Tom Hendrie	(Scotland)	2014-2016
Colin Martin	(Scotland)	2016-?
Jamie Sandilands	(Scotland)	2020-2021
Darren Wilson	(Scotland)	2021-2024
John Millar	(Scotland)	2024-2025
Lewis Turner	(Scotland)	2025-2026
Scott Woodhouse	(Scotland)	2026-

^{c} Caretaker manager

¹

== Honours ==
Scottish Junior Cup

- Winners: 1999–2000
- Runners-up: 1965–66, 1994–95

=== Other honours ===
- Alex Jack Cup: 2024–25
- Cup Winners Shield: 2024-25
- East of Scotland Centenary Cup winners: 2023
- East of Scotland League Second Division winners: 2022–23
- East of Scotland League Conference X winners: 2021–22
- East Region Premier Division winners: 1985–86, 1986–87, 1988–89, 1989–90, 1995–96, 1997–98, 2000–01
- East Region Division One winners: 1977–78
- Lothian District Division One winners: 2004–05
- East of Scotland Junior Cup winners: 1965–66, 1968–69, 1969–70, 1973–74, 1997–98, 2001–02
- Fife & Lothians Cup: 1969–70, 1986–87, 1991–92, 1998–99
- Brown Cup winners: 1959–60, 1967–68, 1971–72, 1972–73, 2000–01
