= Paul Ronald =

Scottish footballer and manager

Personal information
- Date of birth: 19 July 1971 (age 55)
- Place of birth: Glasgow, Scotland
- Position: Striker

Youth career
- Campsie Black Watch

Senior career*
Years	Team	Apps	(Gls)
1991–1994	Clyde	54	(4)
1994–1996	Happy Valley AA	40	
1996–1997	East Stirlingshire	24	(1)
1997–1998	East Fife	37	(10)
1998–2000	Stranraer	48	(16)
2000–2002	Berwick Rangers	38	(5)
2002	Airdrieonians	5	(0)
2002–2004	Airdrie United	39	(4)
2004–2006	Dumbarton	42	(4)
2006–2009	Queen's Park	59	(2)
Total		346	(54)

Managerial career
- 2011–2012: Bo'ness United
- 2013–2016: Kirkintilloch Rob Roy (assistant / co manager)
- 2016: Queen's Park (assistant)
- 2016–2017: Kilbirnie Ladeside (assistant)
- 2017–2019: Linlithgow Rose (assistant)
- * Club domestic league appearances and goals

Paul Ronald (born 19 July 1971) is a Scottish former footballer.

Pro youth Coach Hamilton Accies FC between 2000 and 2006, SFA qualified B Licence Holder and Youth diploma licence Holder. Queens Park Youth coach / reserves coach 2006-2011 He was then manager of East Superleague club stepping away from senior football to junior, Bo'ness United from June 2011 until September 2012. On 11 May 2013, Ronald joined Kirkintilloch Rob Roy as assistant manager to Stewart Maxwell.

== Personal life ==
Now working as Scout and Match analysis for Ross County Football Club Brother Gerry Ronald - ex pro footballer 70/80s Clydebank Football Club Brother Derek Ronald - ex pro footballer 80s Clydebank FC, Malta Hibernians FC 80s/90s Ronald's son Owen is also a footballer.
