= Robbie Horn =

Scottish footballer and manager

Personal information
- Date of birth: 3 August 1977 (age 49)
- Place of birth: Edinburgh, Scotland
- Position: Central defender

Youth career
- Yett Farm Boys Club

Senior career*
| Years | Team | Apps | (Gls) |
| 1996–1999 | Heart of Midlothian | 1 | (0) |
| 1998–1999 | → Cowdenbeath (loan) | 8 | (0) |
| 1999–2004 | Forfar Athletic | 100 | (2) |
| 2004–2010 | Berwick Rangers | 87 | (4) |
| Total | | 196 | (6) |

International career
| 1997–1998 | Scotland U21 | 6 | (0) |

Managerial career
- 2010–2012: Vale of Leithen
- 2015–2017: Bonnyrigg Rose
- 2017–2018: Berwick Rangers
- 2018–2024: Bonnyrigg Rose
- * Club domestic league appearances and goals

Robbie Horn (born 3 August 1977) is a Scottish former professional football player, who was most recently the manager of Scottish League Two club Bonnyrigg Rose.

Horn played for Heart of Midlothian, Cowdenbeath, Forfar Athletic and Berwick Rangers in the Scottish Football League.

After a stint as manager of Vale of Leithen, Horn assisted Colin Cameron at Berwick. He was appointed manager of junior club Bonnyrigg Rose Athletic in June 2015. Horn led Bonnyrigg to the East Super League championship in 2015–16. Bonnyrigg then reached the fourth round of the 2016–17 Scottish Cup, where they lost 8–1 to cup holders Hibernian.

Horn was appointed manager of Berwick Rangers in August 2017. He resigned from this position in October 2018, with the club in second-bottom place in the 2018–19 Scottish League Two table.

Horn returned to former club Bonnyrigg Rose after leaving Berwick and would go on to lead the club to the East of Scotland title and promotion to the Lowland League. Horn then led Bonnyrigg to the SPFL, winning promotion to Scottish League Two in 2022 by winning the Lowland League and a playoff against Cowdenbeath. Horn left Bonnyrigg Rose in March 2024, after the club went on a nine-game run without a win that left them just above the relegation play-off position in League Two.

== Managerial statistics ==
As of match played 23 March 2024

| Team | From | To | Record | | | | |
| Team | From | To | G | W | D | L | Win % |
|---|---|---|---|---|---|---|---|
| Berwick Rangers | August 2017 | October 2018 | 49 | 10 | 10 | 29 | 20.41 |
| Bonnyrigg Rose | November 2018 | March 2024 | 177 | 103 | 25 | 49 | 58.19 |
| Total | | | 226 | 113 | 35 | 78 | 50.00 |

- stats for first spell at Bonnyrigg Rose unavailable.
