= Todd Lumsden =

English footballer and manager

Personal information
- Date of birth: 6 February 1978 (age 48)
- Place of birth: Consett, England
- Position: Central defender

Youth career
- –1997: Oxford United

Senior career*
Years	Team	Apps	(Gls)
1997–1998	Stirling Albion	19	(1)
1998–1999	Chester-le-Street Town		
1999–2003	Albion Rovers	116	(8)
2003–2005	Hamilton Academical	48	(3)
2005–2009	Raith Rovers	86	(0)
2008–2009	→ Albion Rovers (loan)	9	(0)
2009–2013	Albion Rovers	50	(1)

Managerial career
- 2012–2013: Albion Rovers
- 2015–2016: Arbroath
- 2016–2017: Linlithgow Rose
- * Club domestic league appearances and goals as of 19:19, 1 Nov 2016 (UTC)

Todd Lumsden (born 6 February 1978 in Consett) is an English football player and manager.

== Career ==
Lumsden mostly played in the lower leagues of Scottish football, although he did play for Hamilton Academical at First Division level. He was appointed player/manager of Albion Rovers in May 2012, after Paul Martin resigned for health reasons. Lumsden left Albion Rovers after the 2012–13 season, as the club were relegated from the Second Division. He was succeeded by his assistant James Ward.

On 1 July 2014 Lumsden became assistant manager to Allan Moore at Arbroath He became interim manager after Moore left the club in April 2015 and was appointed manager on a two-year deal on 30 April 2015. However, after less than a year with the side, Lumsden was sacked following a run of bad results.

On 5 August 2016, Lumsden become assistant manager at Junior Club Linlithgow Rose F.C. He became team manager on 31 October 2016. He was fired on 2 May 2017.

== Personal life ==
Outside of football, Lumsden is the Sports Faculty Director at West Lothian College.

== Manager statistics ==
As of 6 March 2016

Team	Nat	From	To	Record				
Team	Nat	From	To	G	W	D	L	Win %
Albion Rovers	(Scotland)	May 2012	May 2013	38	7	4	27	18.42
Arbroath	(Scotland)	April 2015	March 2016	36	11	9	16	30.56
Total				74	18	13	43	24.32

- statistics at Arbroath include initial spell as caretaker.

== Honours and achievements ==
=== Player ===
Hamilton Academical

- Scottish Second Division promotion (1): 2003-04 (third tier)

Raith Rovers

- Scottish Second Division (1): 2008-09 (third tier)

Albion Rovers

- Scottish Second Division play-offs (2): 2010-11 (promoted to third tier); 2011-12 (prevented relegation to fourth tier)
