= Prestonfield, Linlithgow =

Football stadium in Linlithgow, Scotland

Prestonfield
- Location within West Lothian
- Location: Linlithgow, West Lothian
- Coordinates: 55.9727°N 3.6121°W
- Capacity: 2,264 (301 seated)
- Surface: Grass
- Field size: 104 × 65 yards

Construction
- Opened: 1949

Tenant
- Linlithgow Rose F.C. (1949–present)

Prestonfield is a football stadium in the royal burgh of Linlithgow, West Lothian, Scotland. It is the home stadium of Linlithgow Rose of the Lowland League East.

The stadium was opened in 1949 and currently consists of a covered and seated stand opposite a covered enclosure with the rest of the ground being concrete terracing. The current capacity is 2,264 of whom 301 can be seated.

In July 2018, Livingston F.C. confirmed that their home ties in the 2018–19 Scottish League Cup Group stage would be held at Prestonfield, due to delays with the installation of a new artificial turf pitch at their own Almondvale Stadium, situated about 7 miles (11 km) from Linlithgow.
