= Mark Bradley (footballer, born 1976) =

Scottish footballer and manager

Mark Bradley (born 10 August 1976) is a Scottish football player and manager. As a player, Bradley represented Hearts, Stirling Albion, Cowdenbeath, Berwick Rangers, Dumbarton, Bathgate Thistle and Linlithgow Rose.

Bradley became manager of Linlithgow Rose in December 2011, and guided the club to the East League title and Scottish Junior Cup Final, before leaving the role in 2014.

On 27 November 2016, Bradley became the manager of Kilbirnie Ladeside, bringing Paul Ronald with him to Valefield as his assistant.

On 22 May 2017, Bradley returned to his managerial position at Linlithgow Rose. He was dismissed from the job two years later, following a 6-2 defeat to Musselburgh.
