= Kelty Hearts F.C. =

Association football club in Scotland

Kelty Hearts
- Full name: Kelty Hearts Football Club
- Nicknames: The Hearts; The Maroon Machine; The Jambos
- Founded: 1975; 51 years ago
- Ground: New Central Park, Kelty
- Capacity: 2,181 (354 seated)
- Coordinates: 56.1363°N 3.3794°W
- Chairman: Jordan Gardner
- Manager: Michael Tidser
- League: Scottish League Two
- 2025–26: Scottish League One, 10th of 10 (relegated)
- Website: keltyhearts.co.uk
Home colours	Away colours

Kelty Hearts Football Club is a football club based in the village of Kelty in Fife, Scotland. Formed in 1975, the club currently competes in Scottish League Two. Their home colours are maroon shirts, white shorts and maroon socks, while their away colours are typically all blue. They play their home games at New Central Park and are nicknamed the "Maroon Machine", "the Jambos" and "the Hearts".

The club were previously members of the Scottish Junior Football Association, playing in the Fife League followed by the East Region Superleague. In December 2017 the club became a full SFA member, making them eligible to enter the Scottish Cup and move up through the pyramid system.

== History ==
In 1975, Kelty Hearts were formed as Kelty Hearts Amateur Football Club and worked their way up from the bottom of the Kirkcaldy & District Amateur Football Association to the top in four seasons. The club turned junior after only a few years to remain competitive with other local sides. They initially played in the Fife League, one of six regions across the country, quickly becoming one of its leading sides, then became members of the East Region in 2002 when the number was reduced to three.

Kelty reached the Scottish Junior Cup final twice but were runners-up both times: in 1999 they lost 1–0 to Kilwinning Rangers, and in 2007 they were defeated 2–1 after extra time by Linlithgow Rose.

Kelty looked to move away from being a junior side after winning the East Region Super League for the second time in 2017. The club applied for membership to join the SFA and in December 2017 became a full member, making them eligible to enter the Scottish Cup as well as progress higher up the Scottish football league system.

After being accepted into and winning the East of Scotland Football League in 2018, Kelty were promoted to the Lowland League (the fifth tier of the Scottish football league system) for the 2018–19 season after a comprehensive 10–0 aggregate win over Threave Rovers in the promotion play-off.

The team had been managed since October 2013 by Tam Courts but the club reluctantly accepted his resignation as manager on 11 October 2018.

Former Rangers and Scotland captain Barry Ferguson was announced as the club's new manager on 18 October 2018.

The 2019–20 Lowland League season was ended with immediate effect on 13 April 2020 due to the COVID-19 pandemic with Kelty Hearts being declared champions on a points per game average based on the current standings.

For the second consecutive season, Kelty were declared champions of the 2020–21 Lowland Football League on a points per game formula due to the ongoing COVID-19 pandemic. The decision was announced by the Lowland Football League on 30 March 2021. Kelty were promoted to the SPFL for the first time on 23 May 2021 after beating Brechin City 3–1 on aggregate in the Pyramid play-off final.

Continuing to make history during the 2021–22 season, Kelty, leading Scottish League Two at the time, played in the fourth round of the Scottish Cup for the first time. Facing Scottish Premiership side and cup holders St Johnstone, Kelty won 1–0 after extra time at home in front of a sold-out crowd, thanks to a goal by Kallum Higginbotham.

Kelty were promoted to Scottish League One at the first attempt with five games of the season remaining on 26 March 2022 when they beat Stenhousemuir 1–0, and nearest challengers Annan Athletic lost their match.

== Ground ==
New Central Park
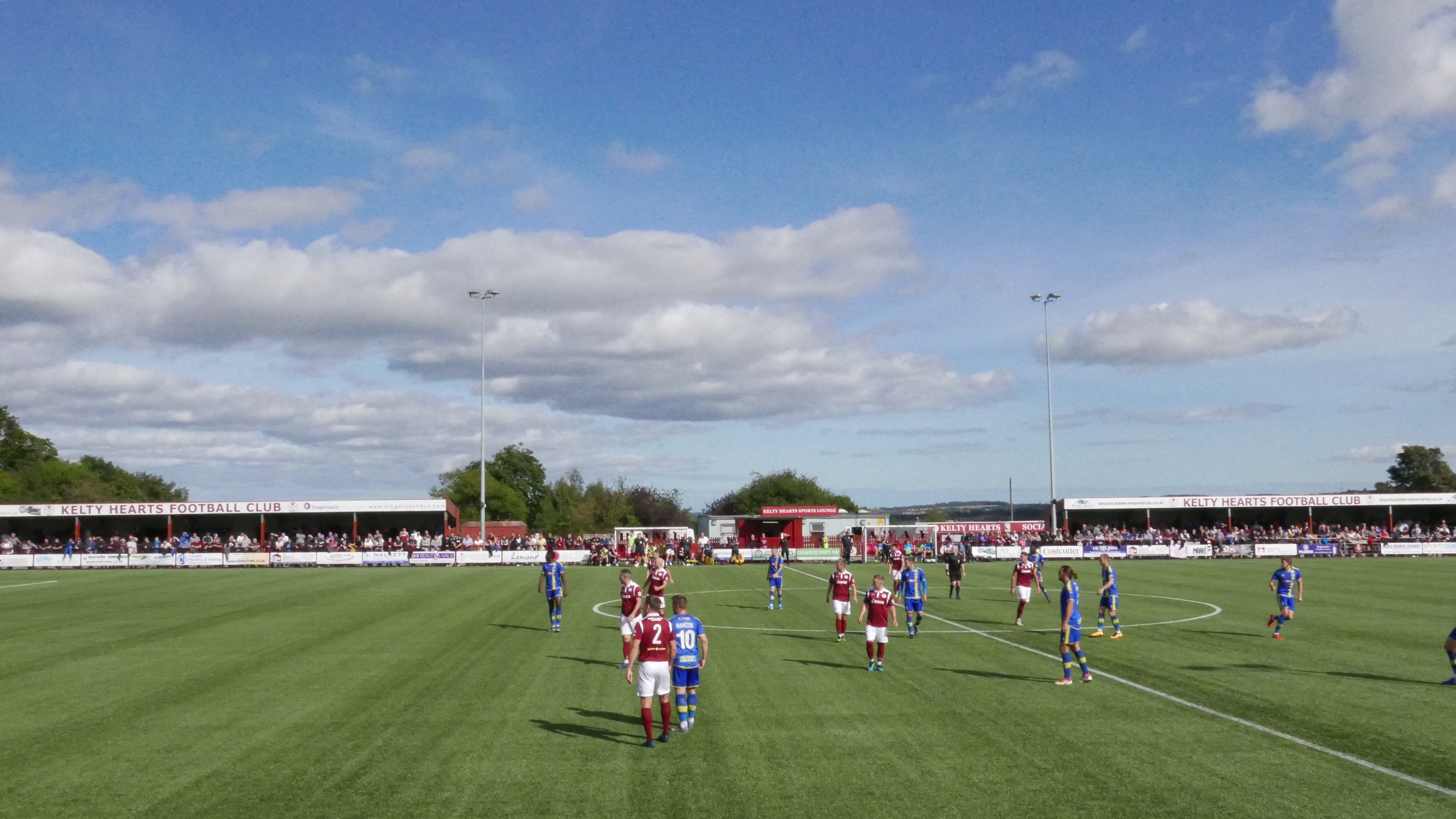
- Kelty Hearts v Solihull Moors, 2019

- Location within Fife
- Former names: Central Park (until 2015)
- Location: Bath Street; Kelty, Fife; KY4 0AG; Scotland
- Coordinates: 56.13625°N 3.37945°W
- Capacity: 2,181 (354 seated)
- Surface: Artificial turf
- Record attendance: 2,300 v Rangers; 7 October 2012
- Field size: 100 x 60 m

Construction
- Renovated: 2015, 2016, 2018

Tenants
- Kelty Hearts (1979–); Kelty Hearts Women (2018–); Dunfermline Athletic Reserves

Kelty Hearts play their home games at New Central Park, situated just off Bath Street in Kelty.

The overall capacity of New Central Park is 2,181 and consists of two covered enclosures which can hold around 1,030 spectators in total and a seated stand with a capacity of 354. There is a social club and a sports bar/hospitality lounge within the ground. The pitch at New Central Park has a 3G MX artificial surface, which was installed in 2015 along with floodlights.

Dunfermline Athletic Reserves also play their home games at New Central Park.

== Supporters ==
The majority of supporters of Kelty Hearts come from the village of Kelty and surrounding areas in Fife.

Kelty are also known to attract many groundhoppers due to the club's good reputation as hosts on matchdays.

=== Rivalries ===
Kelty share a fierce local rivalry with East of Scotland team Hill of Beath Hawthorn. Both clubs were founded in the same year in 1975. The rivalry mainly stems from the close proximity of the two clubs and both being very successful junior sides within the Fife League, often exchanging league title wins from year to year and frequently meeting in the cup competitions. Kelty are currently many leagues above Hill of Beath; however, they can still face each other in the Scottish Cup.

Kelty's other rivals include Linlithgow Rose and Bonnyrigg Rose, two successful former East junior sides, who they have faced in both league and cup competitions over the years.

Upon gaining promotion to the SPFL, Kelty competed in the bigger Fife derbies, with their closest rivals being Cowdenbeath, the two separated by just 2.7 miles (4.3 km).

== Current squad ==
As of 12 September 2026

Note: Flags indicate national team as defined under FIFA eligibility rules; some limited exceptions apply. Players may hold more than one non-FIFA nationality.

No.	Pos.	Nation	Player
1	GK	SCO	Jamie Smith
3	DF	SCO	Callum Hannah
5	DF	SCO	Callum Flatman
6	MF	SCO	Alex Ferguson
7	FW	NIR	Finn Moffett
8	MF	SCO	Connor McManus
9	FW	ENG	Kallum Higginbotham
10	MF	SCO	Innes Murray
11	MF	TAN	Robbie Cole
14	MF	SCO	Jamie Hislop (on loan from Ayr United)
15	DF	SCO	Alasdair Davidson (on loan from Dunfermline Athletic)

No.	Pos.	Nation	Player
16	DF	SCO	Thomas Falconer (on loan from St Mirren)
17	MF	SCO	Matthew Falconer (on loan from Partick Thistle)
18	FW	SCO	Nathan Lawson (on loan from East Kilbride)
21	GK	SCO	Ryan Adamson
22	DF	SCO	Zak Flatman
23	MF	SCO	Lewis Moore
25	DF	IRL	Gordon Walker
26	MF	SCO	Ross Cunningham
29	FW	SCO	Ryan Shanley
35	DF	SCO	Jack Brydon (captain)
--	FW	SCO	Theo McCormick (on loan from St Mirren)

=== On loan ===
Note: Flags indicate national team as defined under FIFA eligibility rules; some limited exceptions apply. Players may hold more than one non-FIFA nationality.

No.	Pos.	Nation	Player
24	DF	SCO	Corrie Fellows (on loan at Largs Thistle)
28	MF	SCO	Jay Snoddy (on loan at Berwick Rangers)

No.	Pos.	Nation	Player
30	MF	SCO	Grant Leitch (on loan at Berwick Rangers)
40	GK	SCO	Cole Miller (on loan at Burntisland Shipyard)

== Coaching staff ==
Position	Name
Manager	(Scotland) Michael Tidser
Goalkeeping coach	(Scotland) Jamie Roberts
Physiotherapist	(Scotland) Charley Fotheringham
Kitman	(Scotland) Calum Wood

== Managers ==
- (Scotland) Tam Courts (2 October 2013 – 11 October 2018)
- (Scotland) Barry Ferguson (18 October 2018 – 24 May 2021)
- (Scotland) Kevin Thomson (28 May 2021 – 31 May 2022)
- (Scotland) John Potter (8 June 2022 – 12 May 2023)
- (Scotland) Michael Tidser (17 May 2023 – 17 January 2025)
- (Scotland) Charlie Mulgrew (17 January 2025 – 8 April 2025)
- (Scotland) Thomas O'Ware (11 April 2025 – 19 September 2026)

== Season-by-season record ==
Season	Division	Tier	Pos.	Pld.	W	D	L	GD	Pts	Scottish Amateur Cup Scottish Junior Cup Scottish Cup
1975–76	Kirkcaldy & District Amateur League	Amateur 1								
1976–77	Kirkcaldy & District Amateur League	Amateur 1								
1977–78	Kirkcaldy & District Amateur League	Amateur 1								
1978–79	Kirkcaldy & District Amateur League	Amateur 1	1st							
1979–80	Kirkcaldy & District Amateur League	Amateur 1								
1980–81	Fife Junior League	Junior 1	2nd	30	19	8	3	+30	46	2nd Round
1981–82	Fife Junior League	Junior 1	3rd	30	16	7	7	+34	39	4th Round
1982–83	Fife Junior League	Junior 1	2nd	32	22	6	4	+45	50	
1983–84	Fife Junior League	Junior 1		34						
1984–85	Fife Junior League	Junior 1		34						2nd Round
1985–86	Fife Junior League	Junior 1		34						1st Round
1986–87	Fife Junior League East Section	Junior 1	2nd	24	14	5	5	+27	33	5th Round
1987–88	Fife Junior League Division 1	Junior 1	2nd	24	15	3	6	+17	33	
1988–89	Fife Junior League Division 1	Junior 1	2nd	24	13	5	6	+27	31	
1989–90	Fife Junior League	Junior 1	4th	30	15	7	8	+32	37	
1990–91	Fife Junior League Division A	Junior 1	1st	21	14	5	2	+31	33	2nd Round
1991–92	Fife Junior League	Junior 1	1st	26	22	1	3	+57	45	2nd Round
1992–93	Fife Junior League	Junior 1	1st	26	22	3	1	+50	47	3rd Round
1993–94	Fife Junior League	Junior 1	5th	28	14	7	7	+53	35	
1994–95	Fife Junior League	Junior 1	2nd	28	17	4	7	+47	38	5th Round
1995–96	Fife Junior League	Junior 1	2nd	28	20	3	5	+64	43	
1996–97	Fife Junior League	Junior 1	1st	28	27	1	0	+84	55	4th Round
1997–98	Fife Junior League	Junior 1	2nd	28	21	6	1	+60	69	2nd Round
1998–99	Fife Junior League	Junior 1	1st	30	26	3	1	+77	81	Runners-up
1999–2000	Fife Junior League	Junior 1	2nd	28	21	3	4	+68	66	4th Round
2000–01	Fife Junior League	Junior 1	4th	28	16	6	6	+41	54	3rd Round
2001–02	Fife Junior League	Junior 1	6th	28	15	7	6	+18	52	4th Round
2002–03	Fife District League	Junior 2	1st	22	18	3	1	+47	57	4th Round
2003–04	Junior East Super League	Junior 1	7th	22	8	4	10	0	24	3rd Round
2004–05	Fife District League	Junior 2	3rd	22	15	4	3	+38	49	3rd Round
2005–06	Fife District League	Junior 2	4th	24	14	5	5	+31	47	1st Round
2006–07	Junior East Premier League	Junior 2	2nd	22	13	3	6	+20	42	Runners-up
2007–08	Junior East Super League	Junior 1	7th	22	8	4	10	0	28	3rd Round
2008–09	Junior East Super League	Junior 1	5th	22	8	6	8	+8	30	2nd Round
2009–10	Junior East Super League	Junior 1	9th	22	7	6	9	-6	27	3rd Round
2010–11	Junior East Super League	Junior 1	9th	22	7	3	12	-9	24	1st Round
2011–12	Junior East Super League	Junior 1	5th	20	7	5	8	-2	26	1st Round
2012–13	Junior East Super League	Junior 1	5th	22	8	4	10	0	28	Quarter-finals
2013–14	Junior East Super League	Junior 1	14th	30	5	11	14	-18	26	1st Round
2014–15	Junior East Super League	Junior 1	1st	28	20	5	3	+40	65	3rd Round
2015–16	Junior East Super League	Junior 1	2nd	30	19	5	6	+29	62	5th Round
2016–17	Junior East Super League	Junior 1	1st	30	25	3	2	+55	78	5th Round
2017–18	East of Scotland League	6	1st	24	23	0	1	+131	69	Preliminary Round 1, losing to Lothian Thistle Hutchison Vale
2018–19	Lowland League	5	3rd	28	16	6	6	+29	54	2nd Round, losing to Peterhead
2019–20	Lowland League	5	1st†	25	22	2	1	+78	68	1st Round, losing to Auchinleck Talbot
2020–21	Lowland League	5	1st†	13	12	0	1	+36	36	2nd Round, losing to Stranraer
2021–22	League Two	4	1st	36	24	9	3	+40	81	5th Round, losing to St Mirren
2022–23	League One	3	8th	36	10	10	16	-15	40	3rd Round, losing to Partick Thistle

† Season curtailed due to COVID-19 pandemic - Kelty were announced as champions for the 2019–20 and 2020–21 season. A points per game basis was used to finalise standings.

== Honours ==
=== Senior ===
- League Two
  - Winners: 2021–22
- Lowland League
  - Winners: 2019–20, 2020–21
- East of Scotland Football League
  - Winners: 2017–18
- King Cup
  - Winners: 2017–18
- East of Scotland (City) Cup:
  - Winners: 2023–24

=== Junior ===
- East Region Super League
  - Winners: 2014–15, 2016–17
  - Runners-up: 2015–16
- Scottish Junior Cup
  - Runners-up: 1998–99, 2006–07
- SJFA East Region Premier League
  - Runners-up: 2006–07
- SJFA Fife District League: 2002–03
- Fife Junior League winners: 1990–91, 1991–92, 1992–93, 1996–97, 1998–99
- Fife Junior (PSM) Cup: 1982–83, 1983–84, 1984–85, 1986–87, 1992–93, 2007–08, 2008–09
- Fife & Tayside (Taycars) Trophy Winners 1997–98
- Cowdenbeath (Interbrew) Cup: 1981–82, 1984–85, 1985–86, 1986–87, 1992–93, 1999–00
- Fife Drybrough Cup: 1981–82
- Laidlaw Shield winners: 1984–85, 1986–87
- Clark Beckett Cup: 1993–94
- ACA Sports Fife League Cup: 2006–07
- Maloco Associates (Fife) Cup: 2007–08, 2008–09
- Rosslyn Trophy Winners: 1991–92, 1996–97
