= Broxburn Athletic F.C. =

Association football club in Scotland

Broxburn Athletic
- Full name: Broxburn Athletic Football Club
- Nicknames: The Brox, The Burn, The Badgers
- Founded: 1947
- Ground: Albyn Park; Greendykes Road; Broxburn
- Capacity: 2,154
- President: Jimmy Porteous
- Manager: John Millar
- League: Lowland League East
- 2025–26: Lowland League, 7th of 18
- Website: www.broxburnathletic.co.uk
Home colours	Away colours	Third colours

Broxburn Athletic Football Club is a Scottish football club based in the town of Broxburn in West Lothian. They play their home games at Albyn Park. The team currently competes in the Lowland League East, the fifth tier of Scottish football, having moved from the junior leagues in 2018.

== History ==
Broxburn reached the Scottish Junior Cup semi-final on five occasions, the last time being in 1971 when they lost by a single goal to eventual cup winners Cambuslang Rangers.

The club won the East Region South Division in 2009–10 and then gained promotion to the East Superleague two years later. They spent six seasons in the Superleague, with a best finish of the 5th in their final season.

After moving to the senior football pyramid for the 2018–19 season, Broxburn won the East of Scotland League Conference C. However they narrowly missed out on the title and promotion to the Lowland league in the round robin playoff against the winners of the other Conferences, Penicuik Athletic and Bonnyrigg Rose. Broxburn were champions in the 2023–24 season, finishing in front of title race rivals Musselburgh Athletic and once again earned the spot in the promotion playoffs where they faced South of Scotland Football League champions Dalbeattie Star F.C.. The first leg was played at Dalbeattie's Islecroft stadium, and the 2nd leg at Broxburn's Albyn park. Broxburn were victorious, securing a 12-2 aggregate victory and promotion to the Lowland Football League for the 2024-25 season.

The club became a full SFA member in 2019 which allowed them to enter the 2019–20 Scottish Cup. They reached the fourth round having won five matches (including victories over higher ranked East Stirlingshire, Cowdenbeath, and Inverurie Loco Works), before going out to Premiership side St. Mirren in Paisley. Broxburn were supported by 1,600 fans who has made the trip along the M8, selling out the North Stand at St Mirren Park. In the 2023–24 Scottish Cup Broxburn reached the third round after victories over Lochee United, Nairn County and Deveronvale before going out on penalties to Buckie Thistle at Albyn Park. The reported attendance of this match was 1175.

== Albyn Park ==
In 1946, Mr. G. W. Bartaby-Pearson, with the help of local businessmen, started the process of reforming Broxburn and secured Albyn Park from the Earl of Buchan. After help from supporters who made the ground improvements, the stadium opened in 1948 with a Heart of Midlothian v Rangers meeting which attracted a crowd of around 3,500.

Albyn Park was completely redeveloped in 2009–10 as part of the Broxburn United Sports Club project into a new community facility with a 3G artificial pitch (replaced in 2020).

It sits on the original Albion Park used by Broxburn F.C. in 1889. Athletic took over the lease in 1894 until both clubs amalgamated in 1912 and played at the sports park (now the Broxburn Sports Centre). Athletic then moved back in 1921 until going defunct in 1924. West Lothian Council now owns the land and Broxburn has a lease until 2036.

The facility is also used by Broxburn Athletic Colts and other clubs. New changing rooms, a social club and floodlights were also constructed. The ground includes a large enclosure on the same side as the changing rooms. The remainder of the ground consists of grass bankings and covered terracing.

== Senior squad ==
As of 19 July 2026

Note: Flags indicate national team as defined under FIFA eligibility rules; some limited exceptions apply. Players may hold more than one non-FIFA nationality.

No.	Pos.	Nation	Player
—	GK	SCO	Kyle King
—	GK	SCO	Matty Wallace
—	DF	SCO	Robbie McGale
—	DF	SCO	Jake Service
—	DF	NIR	Gallagher Lennon
—	DF	SCO	Matthew Shaw
—	DF	SCO	Sam Gormley
—	DF	SCO	Quinn Mitchell
—	MF	SCO	Jon Robertson
—	MF	SCO	Calum Biggar

No.	Pos.	Nation	Player
—	MF	SCO	Ali Shrive
—	MF	SCO	Chris O'Kane
—	MF	SCO	Cooper Knox
—	MF	SCO	Matthew McDonald
—	MF	SEN	Morgaro Gomis
—	MF	SCO	Sam Jones
—	MF	SCO	Scott McCrory-Irving
—	FW	SCO	Errol Douglas (Captain)
—	FW	SCO	Jamie Docherty

== Club staff ==
=== Committee ===
Role	Name
President	(Scotland) Jimmy Porteous
Vice President	(Scotland) John Hughes
Secretary	(Scotland) Jim Provan
Treasurer	(Scotland) Alan Cunningham
Club Photographer	(Scotland) Andrew MacPherson
Chaplain	(Scotland) Andrew MacPherson

=== Coaching staff ===
Role	Name
Manager	(Scotland) John Millar
Assistant Manager	(Scotland) Sean Roycroft
Goalkeeping Coach	(Scotland) Gavin King
Physio	(Scotland) Mark Fountain
Physio	(Scotland) Ian McLaren

== Managerial history ==
Name	Nationality	Years
John McGuigan	(Scotland)	1949-?
Hector Wilkinson	(Scotland)	?-1951
Willie Peden	(Scotland)	1951-1956
Jim McKinnon	(Scotland)	?-1971
Neil Morton	(Scotland)	1971-?
Peter Fortunate	(Scotland)	1973-?
Bill Bruce	(Scotland)	?-1975
Bill Baxter	(Scotland)	1975-?
Peter Duncan	(Scotland)	?-1989
Derek O'Connor	(Scotland)	?-1989
Bill Henderson	(Scotland)	1989-1990
Willie Verth	(Scotland)	1991-1992
Jackie Smyth	(Scotland)	1992-?
Willie Turley	(Scotland)	1997-1998
Jamie Dolan	(Scotland)	2004-2008
Steve Pittman	(United States)	2009-2015
Max Christie	(Scotland)	2014-2017
Brian McNaughton	(Scotland)	2017-2020
Chris Townsley	(Scotland)	2020-2023
Scott McNaughton^{c}	(Scotland)	2023
Steve Pittman	(United States)	2023-2025
John Millar	(Scotland)	2025-

^{c} Caretaker manager

== Season-by-season record ==
=== Senior ===
Season	Division	Tier	Pos.	Pld.	W	D	L	GD	Pts	Scottish Cup
Broxburn Athletic
2018–19	East of Scotland League Conference C	6	1st	24	22	0	2	+62	66	Did Not Participate
2019–20	East of Scotland Premier Division	6	3rd†	19	11	5	3	+11	38	Fourth round, losing to St Mirren
2020–21	East of Scotland Premier Division	6	null††	11	5	1	5	+1	16	First round, lost to Nairn County
2021–22	East of Scotland Premier Division	6	6th	34	15	6	13	+5	49	Preliminary round, lost to Dunbar United
2022–23	East of Scotland Premier Division	6	9th	30	11	10	9	+9	43	First round, lost to Dunipace
2023–24	East of Scotland Premier Division	6	1st	30	23	5	2	+46	74	Third round, lost to Buckie Thistle
2024-25	Scottish Lowland League	5	7th	34	23	5	2	+5	51	Fourth round, lost to Ayr United

† Season curtailed due to COVID-19 pandemic - Broxburn Athletic finished third, based on the 'points per game' measure.

†† Season declared null and void due to COVID-19 pandemic

== Honours ==
- East of Scotland League Conference C: 2018–19
- East of Scotland League Premier Division: 2023–24

=== Junior ===
- East Region League: 1972–73, 1973–74
- East Region South Division: 2009–10
- East Region Lothian District Division Two: 2003–04, 2005–06
- East Region Division B: 1978–79
- East of Scotland Junior Cup: 1950–51, 1987–88
- East Region League Cup: 1952–53, 1954–55, 1972–73
- Coronation Cup: 1952–53
- Murray Cup: 1959–60
- Brown Cup: 1970–71
- National Whitbread Trophy: 1973–74
- Thistle Cup: 1970–71
- R.L. Rae Cup: 1972–73

== Record attendances ==
Historic

Home

11,400 - 1951-52 Scottish Junior Cup vs Kilsyth Rangers, Albyn Park, Broxburn

Away

31,085 - 1950-51 Scottish Junior Cup Semi Final vs Irvine Meadow, Hampden Park, Glasgow

Recent

Home

2,154 - 2024-25 Scottish Cup 4th Round vs Ayr United, Albyn Park, Broxburn

Away

4,372 - 2019-20 Scottish Cup 4th Round vs St. Mirren, Simple Digital Arena, Paisley
