= Kelty =

Coordinates: 56.133°N 3.380°W

Kelty: Scottish Gaelic: Cailtidh
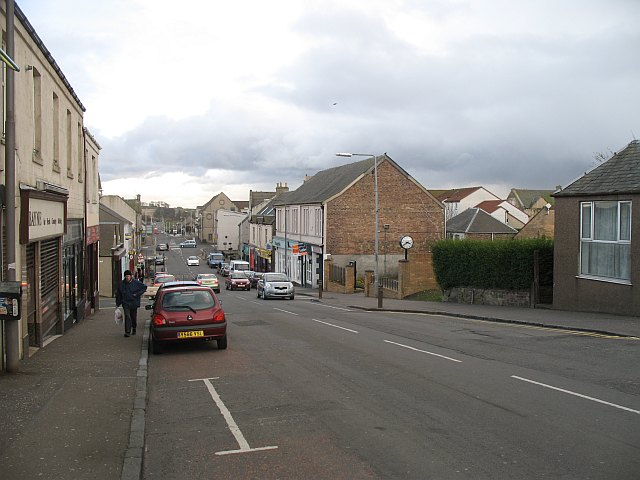
- Main Street

- Location within Fife
- Population: 6,760 (2020)
- OS grid reference: NT143941
- Council area: Fife
- Lieutenancy area: Fife
- Country: Scotland
- Sovereign state: United Kingdom
- Post town: KELTY
- Postcode district: KY4
- Dialling code: 01383
- Police: Scotland
- Fire: Scottish
- Ambulance: Scottish
- UK Parliament: Glenrothes and Mid Fife
- Scottish Parliament: Cowdenbeath

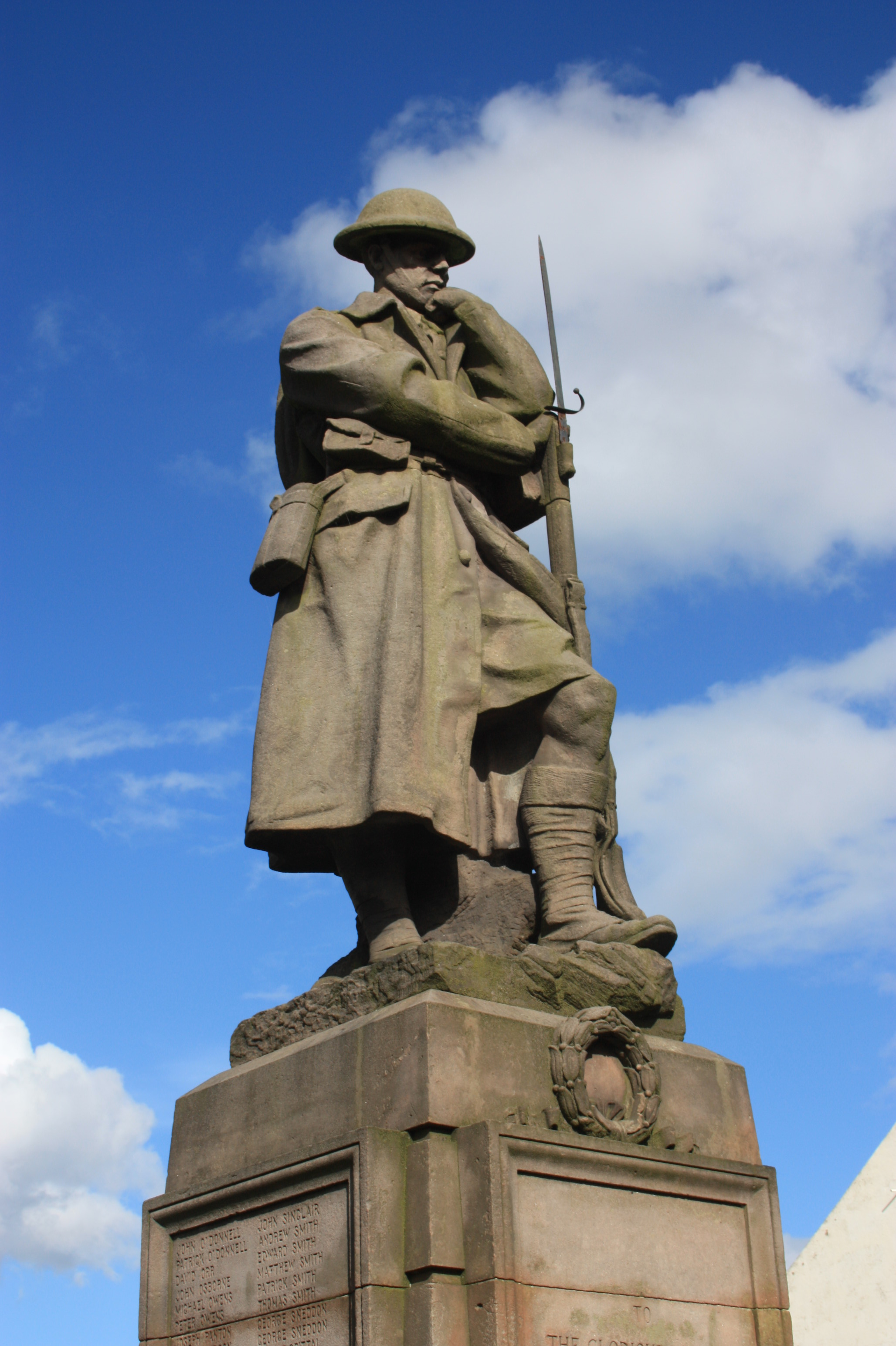
Kelty war memorial

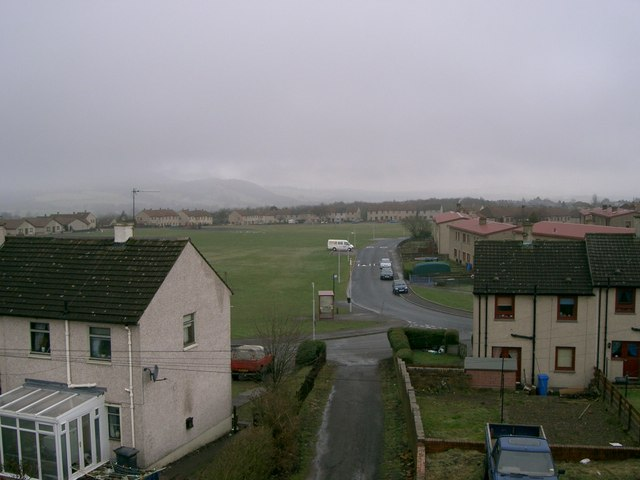
Housing scheme on the west side of Kelty

Kelty (Scottish Gaelic: Cailtidh) is a former coal mining town located in Fife, Scotland. Lying in the heart of the old mining heartlands of Fife and adjacent to the M90 motorway, it is situated on the Fife/Kinross-shire boundary and has a population of around 6,000 residents. This was nearer to 9,000 when the coal mining industry was still operational in late 1970s and early 1980s.

== Origins ==
The origin of the name of the town is somewhat obscure. It could come from the Scottish Gaelic coillte or coilltean meaning 'wood' or 'woodland' or it could come from the Gaelic cailtidh, a reduced form of the early Gaelic *caleto-dubron, meaning 'hard water'. In either case, it was probably originally a Pictish name that was later adapted to Gaelic.

The town began around 1850 as a mining village linked to several coal mines in the area, mainly owned by the Fife Coal Company and continued to expand with the increase of mines until 1930. The vast majority of the settlements within the town were built within the mid-20th century, with expansions continuing into the 21st century; a considerable expansion is currently underway.

== Education and amenities ==
Kelty has two primary schools, St. Joseph's and Kelty Primary. After primary school, the majority of pupils go on to Beath High School, a comprehensive school in Cowdenbeath, or the local Roman Catholic school, St Columba's High School in Dunfermline. Kelty also has a modern community centre, with a modern library within.

== Church ==
Kelty was part of the parish of Beath (Cowdenbeath) and had a quoad sacra mission church erected in 1894. The mission was upgraded to a chapel in 1897, its minister being Rev George Hunter MA who went to Liverpool in 1903. He was replaced by Rev William Henderson Adam who went to Calderbank in 1919 and was replaced by Rev William Thomson. It was given status as a separate parish, disjoined from Cowdenbeath, in 1925.

== War memorial ==
The war memorial was erected in 1921 and was designed by sculptor William Birnie Rhind.

== Notable people ==
- Claire Baker, MSP for Mid-Scotland and Fife
- Stephen Husband, professional footballer
- Willie Penman, professional footballer
- Willie Rennie, Leader of the Scottish Liberal Democrats (2011–2021)
- Alex Rowley, Deputy Leader of the Scottish Labour Party (2015–2017)
- Robert Stewart, Draughts World Champion (1922–1933)

== Sport ==
Kelty Hearts won Scottish League Two in 2022, having been promoted from the Lowland League in 2021.

== Blairadam House ==
Blairadam House, just north of Kelty but on the west side of the M90, was the long-term home of the Adam family: William Adam, Robert Adam, John Adam, William Adam of Blair Adam, Charles Adam etc.
