= Allan McGonigal =

Scottish footballer (born 1964)

Personal information
- Date of birth: 27 March 1964 (age 62)
- Place of birth: Stirling, Scotland
- Position: Striker

Youth career
- 1974–1981: Gairdoch United
- 1981–1982: ICI Grangemouth
- 1982–1983: Falkirk

Senior career*
| Years | Team | Apps | (Gls) |
| 1981 | Stenhousemuir | 1 | (0) |
| 1983–1985 | Falkirk | 25 | (3) |
| 1984–1987 | East Stirlingshire | 100 | (14) |
| 1987–1988 | Meadowbank Thistle | 20 | (12) |
| 1988–1989 | Cowdenbeath | 26 | (8) |
| 1989–1990 | East Fife | 25 | (5) |
| 1990–1992 | Linlithgow Rose | | |
| 1992–1997 | Camelon | | |
| Total | | 197 | (42) |

Managerial career
- 1999–2001: Linlithgow Rose
- 2006–2007: Sauchie
- 2007–2008: Camelon
- 2008: Berwick Rangers
- 2009–2010: Bo'ness United
- 2010–2012: Hamilton Academical (youth)
- 2012–2018: Bo'ness United
- * Club domestic league appearances and goals

Allan McGonigal (born 27 March 1964) is a Scottish retired footballer, the former manager of Berwick Rangers and, as of 2019, the director of football at Scottish Premiership club Hamilton Academical.

== Playing career ==
McGonigal was a striker with Stenhousemuir (playing only one game for the club as a 16-year-old), Falkirk (where his development was stalled by a badly broken arm), East Stirlingshire, Meadowbank Thistle, Cowdenbeath and East Fife. He was in the Meadowbank side that were runners-up to Hamilton Academical in the First Division in 1987–88, although he scored a hat-trick against the Accies in a 5–1 win earlier in that season.

In 1990, he moved down to the Junior level, playing with Linlithgow Rose and Camelon, winning several trophies with the latter including the Scottish Junior Cup in 1995 plus a losing appearance in its final the following year. He retired from playing altogether aged 32 to concentrate on coaching and other interests.

== Managerial career ==
As well as starting a business running a chain of Post Offices, McGonigal became assistant manager to George Fairley at Camelon then moved with him to Linlithgow Rose in 1999, becoming manager there himself soon after. Having worked with his brother at Camelon, McGonigal served as Brian Fairley's assistant manager at Senior clubs Stenhousemuir (2000 to 2001), Bo'ness United (2001 to 2003), Dumbarton (2003 to 2004), and Forfar (2004 to 2005) before becoming manager of Sauchie and Camelon in the Juniors, prior to a short unsuccessful period at Berwick Rangers in the 2008–09 Scottish Third Division. He reunited with Brian Fairlie for another spell at Linlithgow Rose (2008 to 2009) and was then persuaded to return to Bo'ness United as manager.

On 24 June 2010, Hamilton Academical announced the appointment of McGonigal as their under-19 team manager. He remained in that role for two years, thereafter taking on an administrative role for one year alongside Allan Maitland while maintaining a continued presence at Bo'ness United as a director. He resumed managerial duties at Bo'ness in 2012 until resigning in January 2018 for personal reasons, with successes including the 2013–14 East Superleague and a subsequent run to the Fourth Round in the 2014–15 Scottish Cup.

In December 2018, following the appointment of Allan Maitland as chairman of Hamilton Academical, McGonigal was brought back to the club as director of football; they soon replaced struggling manager Martin Canning with Brian Rice whose remit was to be head coach working alongside McGonigal.
