= Fauldhouse United F.C. =

Association football club in Scotland

Fauldhouse United
- Full name: Fauldhouse United Football Club
- Nickname: United or The Hoose
- Founded: 1919
- Ground: Park View; Fauldhouse
- Capacity: 2,000
- Coordinates: 55°49′57″N 3°42′20″W
- Manager: Steven Sharp
- League: East of Scotland League Second Division
- 2025–26: East of Scotland League Second Division, 14th of 15
- Website: https://www.fauldhouseunited.co.uk/
Home colours	Away colours

Fauldhouse United Football Club are a Scottish football club based at Park View in Fauldhouse, West Lothian.

The club won the Scottish Junior Cup in 1946 and currently play in the East of Scotland League Second Division

== Club staff ==
=== Board of directors ===
Role	Name
Chairman	(Scotland) Derek Sharp

=== Coaching staff ===
Role	Name
Manager	(Scotland) Steven Sharp
Head coach	(Scotland) Robert Stewart
Assistant	(Scotland) David O’Donnell
Assistant	(Scotland) Sean Beaton
Goalkeeping coach	(France) Eric Tshibangu Ntambwe
Sports scientist / coach	(Scotland) Jack Paton
Strength & conditioning coach/first aid	(Scotland) Jamie Gallagher
Development squad manager	(Scotland) Sean Beaton
Development squad coach	(Scotland) Eddie Phillips
Development squad coach	(Scotland) Scott Munden

== Current squad ==
As of 27 October 2022

Note: Flags indicate national team as defined under FIFA eligibility rules; some limited exceptions apply. Players may hold more than one non-FIFA nationality.

No.	Pos.	Nation	Player
—	GK	SCO	Daniel Tobin
—	GK	SCO	Jacob Weatherby
—	GK	ENG	Jamie Meikle (On-loan from Celtic)
—	GK	SCO	Gavin McQuillan
—	DF	SCO	Andrew Cormack
—	DF	SCO	Ritchie Kirwan
—	DF	SCO	Reece Lowdon
—	DF	SCO	Stewart Thompson
—	DF	SCO	Corey McKeown
—	DF	SCO	Geosyl Okocha
—	DF	SCO	Jack Perry
—	DF	SCO	Kevin Ross
—	MF	SCO	Mark Hunter
—	MF	SCO	Ross Paton
—	MF	SCO	Sam Ghoul

No.	Pos.	Nation	Player
—	MF	SCO	Kieran Trindade
—	MF	SCO	Clark Rankin
—	FW	SCO	Tyrone Core
—	FW	SCO	Daniel McDonald
—	FW	SCO	Ryan Donnelly
—	FW	SCO	Darrel Wilson
—	FW	SCO	Mark Duffy
—	FW	SCO	Cavan Loney
—	FW	SCO	Steven Weir (Captain)

== Managerial history ==
Name	Nationality	Years
Alex "Dixie" McLaughlin	(Scotland)	1950-?
Jim Carty	(Scotland)	?-1968
Eddie Coakley	(Scotland)	1968-1969
Jocky Wilson	(Scotland)	1969-?
Vince Halpin^{p}	(Scotland)	1969-?
Jim Carty	(Scotland)	1974-?
Joe Baker	(England)	1981-?
Tommy Allison	(Scotland)	1984-?
Jim McCafferty	(Scotland)	1987-?
Jim Sinnett	(Scotland)	1988-1990
John Jamieson	(Scotland)	?-1990
Billy Bishop	(Scotland)	1990-?
Bill Henderson	(Scotland)	?-1992
Jim Dempsey	(Scotland)	1992-?
Dennis Lawson	(Scotland)	1994-?
Willie Knox	(Scotland)	1994-?
Jimmy Crease	(Scotland)	1998-?
Jim Harkins	(Scotland)	2001-2003
David Cowan	(Scotland)	2011-2016
Stevie Findlay	(Scotland)	2016-2017
Jon Connolly¹	(Scotland)	2017-2020
Sammy Watson	(Scotland)	2020
Chris Mackie	(Scotland)	2020-2022
Colin Hendry	(Scotland)	2022
Iain Diack	(Scotland)	2022-2025
Neil Schoneville	(Scotland)	2025-2026
Steven Sharp	(Scotland)	2026-

^{c} Caretaker manager

¹ David Dunn and Mark Daly took interim charge of the team in 2019 due to manager illness.

^{p} Player manager

== Honours ==
Scottish Junior Cup

- Winner: 1945–46

SJFA East Region South Division

- Winners: 2007–08, 2012–13

=== Other honours ===
- Fife & Lothians Cup winners: 1992–93
- Edinburgh & District League winners: 1945–46
- East Region Division One winners: 1982–83, 1992–93
- East Region Division Two winners: 1981–82, 1996–97, 2001–02
- East of Scotland Junior Cup winners: 1944–45, 1945–46
- East Junior League Cup: 1981–82, 1982–83, 2002–03, 2003–04
- Brown Cup winners: 1945–46, 1960–61
