= Linlithgow Rose F.C. =

Association football club in Scotland

Linlithgow Rose
- Full name: Linlithgow Rose Football Club
- Nicknames: The Rose, Rosey Posey, The Gallant
- Founded: 1889; 137 years ago
- Ground: Prestonfield, Braehead Road, Linlithgow
- Capacity: 2,264 (300 seated)
- Coordinates: 55.972698°N 3.612236°W
- Manager: Gordon Herd
- League: Lowland League East
- 2025–26: Lowland League, 1st of 18 (champions)
- Website: linlithgowrose.co.uk
Home colours	Away colours

Linlithgow Rose Football Club are a Scottish football club based in Linlithgow, West Lothian. The team plays in the Lowland League East, which is the fifth tier of Scottish football, having won the 2022–23 East of Scotland Football League Premier Division.

With playing colours of maroon and white, Linlithgow Rose have won the Scottish Junior Cup four times, in 1965, 2002, 2007 and 2010. Linlithgow also finished as runners-up in 1974, 2003 and 2013.

== History ==
Although officially formed in 1889, there are no newspaper reports of a club by this name until 1898 giving rise to the notion that the original date could either be speculation or is a misprinted date that has been subsequently used as fact. In 1916 the club closed down and was effectively defunct until it was re-formed in July 1923. Their home games have been played, since 1949, at Prestonfield. With a current maximum capacity of 2,264 spectators (301 seated), the record attendance at the ground is 3,626 for a game against Petershill.

=== The Sinnet years ===
Jim Sinnet arrived at Prestonfield in the Spring of 2001 on the back of a fairly bleak season for the Rose. An immediate impact was felt as he brought in the quality required to challenge. Boris McLaughlin, Buzz Lamont, David Beaton and Iain Gallacher to name a few.

In season 2001/02 The Rose went on what would become one of the most iconic seasons in the history of the club. Led by Gallacher, Linlithgow won the Final John Walker League Trophy and all but one competition entered. The finale being a 1–0 win over Auchinleck Talbot at Firhill, Glasgow in the Scottish Junior Cup coutesry of Jimmy Creaney. Season 2002/03 seen another successful season with the team falling at the final hurdle in the Scottish Junior Cup final in a 1–0 defeat to Tayport at Firhill, Glasgow. In the Season 2003/04 The Rose won their first ever East Region Superleague.

Sinnet made large changes after two fairly barren seasons and 2006/07 saw the Rose re-installed as Junior champions in a Double winning season, winning the Super League and Scottish Junior Cup. Brian Carrigan and Mark Whyte, in the last minute of Extra time, scored the goals to defeat Kelty Hearts 2–1. The game was played at East End Park in front of 5,000 Rose fans.

Due to reforms by the SFA, Linlithgow Rose took part in the 2007–08 Scottish Cup. On 24 November 2007, they beat Dalbeattie Star 1–0 in the third round thanks to a goal from Stuart McArthur in the second minute of the game. They progressed into the fourth round where they were drawn against Queen of the South. Queen of the South won the tie 4–0 and progressed to the final, where they lost 3–2 to Rangers.

The Rose also progressed into the fourth round of the 2007–08 Scottish Junior Cup after beating Bo'ness United 1–0 on 1 December 2007. However they were knocked out in the next round. Linlithgow in this period were successful in upgrading Prestonfield to enable full SFA license, allowing the team to compete in the Scottish FA cup indefinitely, a path which is no longer available to any club outside the Senior League Setup.

Jim Sinnet, who was one of the most successful managers in the club's history, resigned during the 2007–08 season. Former Dumbarton and Forfar boss Brian Fairley was later appointed as his successor.

=== Baikie - Scottish Cup Specialist ===
After the resignation of Brian Fairley and his assistant Allan McGonigal in February 2009 the club were put into the temporary control of Ian Gallacher, Mark Bradley and Danny Smith as they searched for a new manager. Dave Baikie was appointed on 24 April 2009.

Linlithgow then won the Scottish Junior Cup again in 2010 with a second half strike from Kevin Donnelly in a 1–0 win over Largs at Rugby Park, Kilmarnock. They also managed to win The East of Scotland Cup in June 2010 against Musselburgh which Linlithgow won 2–1, both goals from Striker Tommy Coyne. Linlithgow finished a close second in the league to near rivals Bo'ness United in the 2009–10 season.

=== Recent history ===
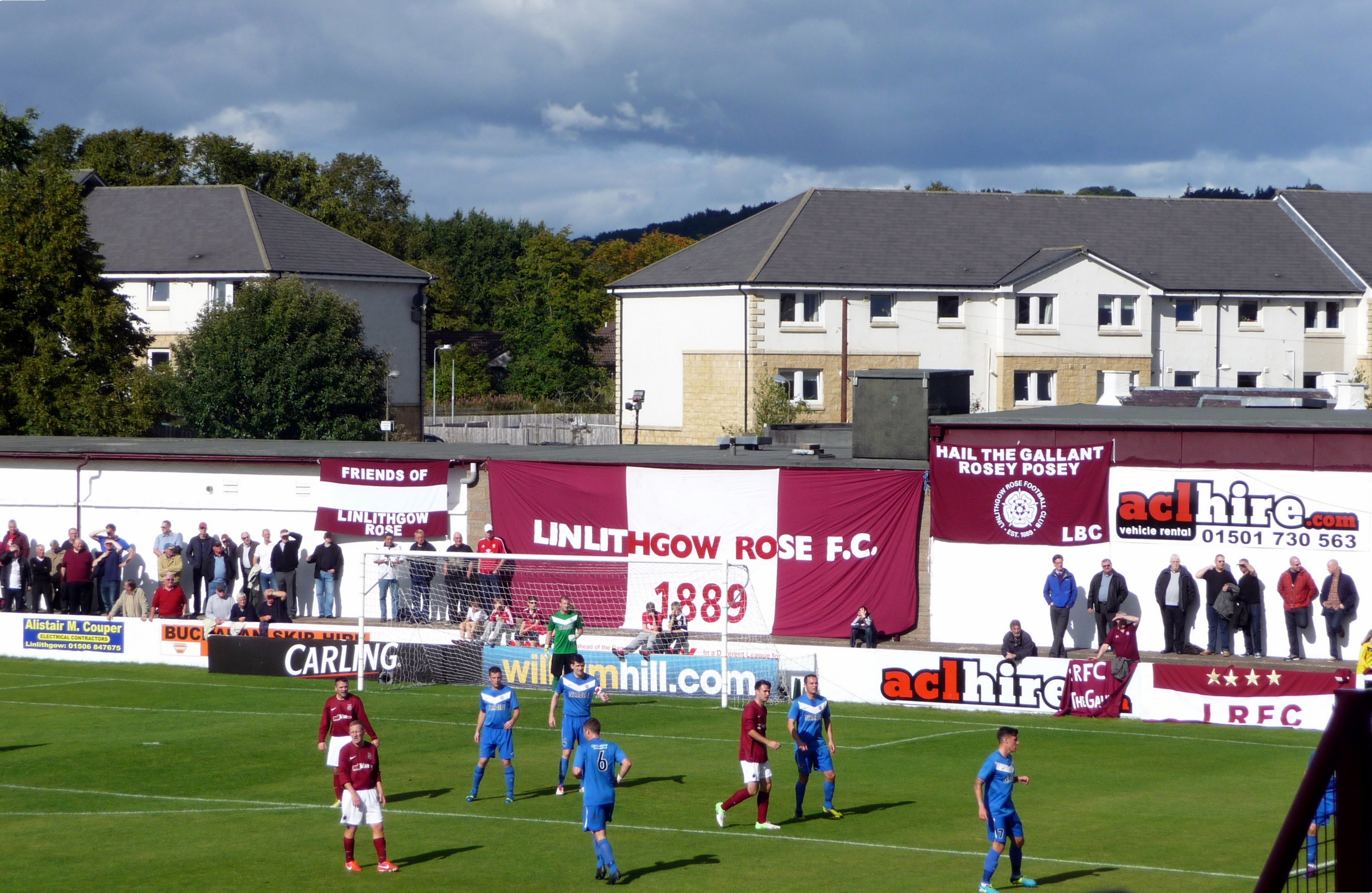
Linlithgow Rose v Nairn County, 2013–14 Scottish Cup first round

Mark Bradley replaced Baikie as manager in December 2011. Over a period of 13 months, Linlithgow went on an unbeaten run of 49 games, only to lose to Auchinleck Talbot in the 2013 Scottish Junior Cup Final. The club remained undefeated throughout the 2012–13 season and won three trophies out of a possible five, securing the East Superleague by 19 points, along with the League Cup, and the Fife & Lothians Cup.

Bradley resigned in March 2014 and was replaced by former player Danny Smith. Smith lead the team successfully in the Scottish FA Cup with a 2–0 loss to Raith Rovers, at the time a Championship club, and a Semi final exit to Musselburgh Athletic in the Scottish Junior Cup.

Smith in turn, was replaced in June 2015 by David McGlynn. In January 2016, Linlithgow became the first junior team to reach the last 16 of the Scottish Cup after beating Forfar Athletic. A valiant 4–2 loss to Ross County, who were at that time 4th in the SPL ended the run.

McGlynn resigned as manager in October 2016, with his assistant Todd Lumsden replacing him. A Scottish Junior Cup run to a semi-final loss to Auchinleck Talbot failed to save Lumsden who was sacked in April 2017 when The Rose lay third bottom of the table.

Linlithgow re-appointed Mark Bradley as manager in 2017.

=== Senior football ===
The club moved to the East of Scotland Football League in 2018, along with many other East Region junior clubs. In their first season as a senior club, they finished second in Conference C to ensure their place in the Premier Division. The 2019 season started strongly with the Rose making healthy progressions in both the league and the cups. Mark Bradley was sacked on 29 September 2019, the day after a 6–2 defeat by Musselburgh Athletic. The management team and fans both heavily criticized the decision.

Former Stenhousemuir F.C and Rangers Academy Coach, Brown Ferguson, took over the role as manager on 13 October 2019. Ferguson was sacked in August 2021. Gordon Herd was appointed manager later the same month.

== Scottish Junior Cup finals record ==
Linlithgow have a mixed record in the Junior Cup final, winning in four of their seven appearances. As one of the more successful clubs of the modern era, they have reached five finals in the last twenty years, with only Auchinleck Talbot appearing more often in that time.

Season	Opponent	Result
1964–65	Baillieston Juniors	4–1
1973–74	Cambuslang Rangers	1–3
2001–02	Auchinleck Talbot	1–0
2002–03	Tayport	0–1
2006–07	Kelty Hearts	2–1
2009–10	Largs Thistle	1–0
2012–13	Auchinleck Talbot	0–1

== Club staff ==
=== Board of directors ===
Role	Nationality	Name
President	(England)	Jon Mahoney
Secretary	(Scotland)	Derek Crossan
Vice President	(Scotland)	Stuart Smith

=== Management ===
Position	Name
Manager	Gordon Herd
Assistant manager	Darren Wilson
Sport Scientist	Luke Stephen
Coach	Eamon Fullerton
GK coach	Paul Cairney

== Current squad ==
As of 26 June 2026

Note: Flags indicate national team as defined under FIFA eligibility rules; some limited exceptions apply. Players may hold more than one non-FIFA nationality.

No.	Pos.	Nation	Player
1	GK	SCO	Cammy Binnie
2	DF	SCO	Jamie Watson
3	DF	SCO	Cammy Thomson
4	DF	SCO	Craig Smith
5	DF	SCO	Ciaran Greene
6	DF	SCO	Greg Skinner
7	FW	SCO	Dylan Paterson
8	MF	SCO	Connor McMullan (Captain)
9	FW	SCO	Blair Henderson
10	FW	SCO	Calum Rae
11	FW	SCO	Lucas Stenhouse

No.	Pos.	Nation	Player
12	GK	SCO	Thomas Elvin
14	FW	SCO	Sally Turay
15	MF	SCO	Liam McQuaid
17	MF	SCO	James Berry
18	FW	SCO	Jordan Tosh
19	FW	SCO	Olly Hamilton
22	MF	SCO	Adam McGowan
25	MF	SCO	Paul Kennedy
28	MF	MRI	Louis Maguire
TBC	FW	GAM	Peter Mendy

=== Out on loan ===
Note: Flags indicate national team as defined under FIFA eligibility rules; some limited exceptions apply. Players may hold more than one non-FIFA nationality.

No. / Pos. / Nation / Player; 16 / DF / SCO / Frankie Aitchison (on-loan at Dunipace)	No. / Pos. / Nation / Player; 21 / DF / SCO / Cody Martin (on-loan at Armadale Thistle)

== Managerial history ==
Name	Nationality	Years
Davie Roy	(Scotland)	1967-1983?
Jimmy Crease	(Scotland)	1984-?
Colin Sinclair	(Scotland)	1993-1999
Allan McGonigal	(Scotland)	1999-2001
Jim Sinnet	(Scotland)	2001-2009
Brian Fairley	(Scotland)	2009-2011
David Baikie	(Scotland)	2009-2011
Mark Bradley	(Scotland)	2011-2014
Danny Smith	(Scotland)	2014-2015
David McGlynn	(Scotland)	2015-2016
Todd Lumsden	(England)	2016-2017
Jimmy Crease ^{c}	(Scotland)	2017
Mark Bradley	(Scotland)	2017-2019
Jimmy Crease ^{c}	(Scotland)	2019
Brown Ferguson	(Scotland)	2019-2021
Gordon Herd	(Scotland)	2021-

^{c} Caretaker manager

== Season-by-season record ==
=== Senior ===
Season	Division	Pos.	Pld.	W	D	L	GD	Pts	Scottish Cup
Linlithgow Rose
2018-19	East of Scotland League Conference C	2nd	24	20	1	3	+82	61	Second round, losing to Beith Juniors
2019-20	East of Scotland Premier Division	9th†	17	7	3	7	+4	24	Third round, losing to Falkirk
2020-21	East of Scotland Premier Division	n/a††	11	6	4	1	+10	22	Second Round, losing to Forfar
2021-22	East of Scotland Premier Division	3rd	34	20	8	6	+50	68	Preliminary round, losing to Banks O' Dee
2022-23	East of Scotland Premier Division	1st	30	23	5	2	+75	74	Fourth round, losing to Raith Rovers
2023-24	Lowland Football League	8th	34	14	8	12	+20	50	First round, losing to Cowdenbeath 2–1 after extra time.
2024-25	Lowland Football League	5th	34	18	7	9	+17	61	Third round, losing to Raith Rovers

† Season curtailed due to COVID-19 pandemic - Linlithgow Rose finished ninth based on the 'points per game' measure.

†† Season declared null and void due to COVID-19 pandemic - Linlithgow Rose were in third position at the time.

== Honours ==
Scottish Junior Cup

- Winners: 1964–65, 2001–02, 2006–07, 2009–10
- Runners-up: 1973–74, 2002–03, 2012–13

Lowland League

- Winners 2025-26

East Super League

- Winners: 2003–04, 2006–07, 2012–13
- Runners-up: 2009–10, 2013–14, 2017–18

East of Scotland Football League Premier Division

- Winners: 2022–23

=== Other honours ===
- East of Scotland Qualifying Cup: 2021–22, 2024–25
- East of Scotland League Cup: 2021–22
- Edinburgh & District League winners: 1964–65, 1965–66, 1966–67, 1967–68
- East Region Division One winners: 1974–75, 1977–78, 1981–82, 1983–84, 1987–88, 1996–97, 1998–99, 1999–00, 2001–02
- East of Scotland Cup: 2004–05
- Fife & Lothians Cup: 1968–69, 1972–73, 1973–74, 1974–75, 1978–79, 1979–80, 1983–84, 1984–85, 1985–86, 1999–00, 2000–01, 2001–02, 2008–09, 2010–11, 2011–12, 2012–13, 2013–14
- East of Scotland Junior Cup: 1953–54, 1964–65, 1967–68, 1975–76, 1977–78, 1988–89, 1990–91, 1992–93, 1995–96, 1999–00, 2000–01, 2003–04, 2009–10
- East Junior League Cup: 1977–78, 1985–86, 1990–91, 1994–95, 2001–02, 2006–07, 2007–08, 2010–11, 2011–12, 2012–13
- St. Michael's Cup: 1996–97, 1998–99, 2001–02, 2002–03, 2003–04
- Brown Cup: 1964–65, 1966–67, 1974–75, 1984–85, 1994–95, 1995–96, 2001–02
