= 2013–14 East Superleague =

McBookie.com East Superleague
- Season: 2013–14
- Champions: Bo'ness United
- Relegated: Tayport; St Andrews United
- Matches: 240
- Goals: 827 (3.45 per match)
- Biggest home win: Bo'ness United 6–1 Broxburn Athletic; 2 Nov 2013
- Biggest away win: Ballingry Rovers 0–8 Sauchie Juniors; 2 Nov 2013
- Highest scoring: Lochee United 3–6 Hill of Beath Hawthorn; 29 Sep 2013
- Longest winning run: (8) Bonnyrigg Rose Athletic; 26 Oct 2013 – 21 Dec 2013
- Longest unbeaten run: (12) Linlithgow Rose; 8 Mar 2014 – season end
- Longest winless run: (14) Tayport; 7 Dec 2013 – 12 Apr 2014
- Longest losing run: (6) Three clubs

The 2013–14 East Superleague (known as the McBookie.com East Superleague for sponsorship reasons) was the 12th season of the East Superleague, the top tier of league competition for SJFA East Region member clubs.

The season began on 10 August 2013 and ended on 14 June 2014. Linlithgow Rose were the reigning champions. The division expanded from twelve to sixteen clubs from this season.

Bo'ness United won the title on 28 May 2014. As champions they entered the preliminary round of the 2014–15 Scottish Cup where they were drawn to receive a bye to the first round.

== Teams ==
The following teams changed division after the 2012–13 season.

=== To East Superleague ===
Promoted from East Premier League

- Newtongrange Star
- Ballingry Rovers
- Tayport
- Armadale Thistle

=== Stadia and locations ===
Club	Location	Ground	Manager	Finishing position 2012–13
Armadale Thistle	Armadale	Volunteer Park	Jim Henderson	East Premier League, 4th
Ballingry Rovers	Glencraig	Ore Park	Stevie Kay	East Premier League, 2nd
Bo'ness United	Bo'ness	Newtown Park	Allan McGonigal	4th
Bonnyrigg Rose Athletic	Bonnyrigg	New Dundas Park	Max Christie	2nd
Broxburn Athletic	Broxburn	Albyn Park	Steve Pittman	6th
Camelon Juniors	Camelon	Carmuirs Park	John Sludden	3rd
Carnoustie Panmure	Carnoustie	Laing Park	Alan McSkimming	9th
Hill of Beath Hawthorn	Hill of Beath	Keirs Park	Jock Finlayson	8th
Kelty Hearts	Kelty	Central Park	Tam Courts	5th
Linlithgow Rose	Linlithgow	Prestonfield	Danny Smith	Champions
Lochee United	Dundee	Thomson Park	Steven Leahy	10th
Musselburgh Athletic	Musselburgh	Olivebank Stadium	David McGlynn	7th
Newtongrange Star	Newtongrange	New Victoria Park	Alan Miller	East Premier League, 1st
St Andrews United	St Andrews	Recreation Park	Phil McGuire	12th
Sauchie Juniors	Sauchie	Beechwood Park	Fraser Duncan	11th
Tayport	Tayport	Canniepairt	David Baikie	East Premier League, 3rd

=== Managerial changes ===
Club	Outgoing manager	Manner of departure	Date of vacancy	Position in table	Incoming manager	Date of appointment
Tayport	John McGlashan	Resigned	14 September 2013	16th	David Baikie	14 September 2013
Kelty Hearts	Willie Newbigging	Sacked	2 October 2013	14th	Tam Courts	2 October 2013
St Andrews United	Jim Hardie	Stepped down through illness	30 November 2013	15th	Gus Malone	30 November 2013
Linlithgow Rose	Mark Bradley	Resigned	1 March 2014	4th	Danny Smith	24 March 2014
Camelon Juniors	Danny Smith	Appointed manager at Linlithgow Rose	24 March 2014	7th	John Sludden	21 April 2014
St Andrews United	Gus Malone	Left by mutual consent	5 May 2014	16th	Phil McGuire	26 May 2014

== League table ==
Pos	Team	Pld	W	D	L	GF	GA	GD	Pts	Qualification or relegation
1	Bo'ness United (C)	30	22	3	5	79	32	+47	69	Qualification for 2014–15 Scottish Cup
2	Linlithgow Rose	30	20	6	4	70	33	+37	66	
3	Bonnyrigg Rose Athletic	30	17	10	3	60	28	+32	61	
4	Newtongrange Star	30	19	1	10	65	34	+31	58	
5	Camelon Juniors	30	16	6	8	51	35	+16	54	
6	Hill of Beath Hawthorn	30	14	7	9	61	44	+17	49	
7	Broxburn Athletic	30	14	6	10	53	56	−3	48	
8	Musselburgh Athletic	30	12	7	11	53	51	+2	43	
9	Sauchie Juniors	30	12	4	14	55	53	+2	40	
10	Lochee United	30	12	1	17	57	72	−15	37	
11	Armadale Thistle	30	8	3	19	35	64	−29	27	
12	Carnoustie Panmure	30	8	3	19	43	74	−31	27	
13	Ballingry Rovers	30	7	6	17	31	67	−36	27	
14	Kelty Hearts (O)	30	5	11	14	36	54	−18	26	Qualification for East Region League play-off
15	Tayport (R)	30	5	7	18	36	62	−26	22	Relegation to East Premier League
16	St Andrews United (R)	30	4	9	17	42	68	−26	21	Relegation to East Premier League

Source: East Region SJFA
Rules for classification: 1) points; 2) goal difference; 3) number of goals scored.
(C) Champions; (O) Play-off winners; (R) Relegated

== Results ==
Home \ Away	ARM	BLL	BNS	BRG	BRX	CAM	CAR	HOB	KEL	LTH	LOC	MUS	NEW	STA	SCH	TAY
Armadale Thistle		0–1	0–7	0–1	0–1	0–2	4–0	0–3	2–1	0–2	3–2	2–3	0–5	3–2	1–3	3–2
Ballingry Rovers	2–1		1–4	0–1	0–3	2–3	2–1	1–3	1–1	0–3	0–3	1–2	2–1	4–3	0–8	2–2
Bo'ness United	2–1	4–2		0–3	6–1	4–0	3–0	2–1	5–0	4–1	5–1	2–1	4–2	3–0	4–1	3–0
Bonnyrigg Rose Athletic	2–0	0–0	0–1		3–0	0–1	4–0	1–1	3–1	2–2	2–0	3–0	0–0	4–3	1–4	3–2
Broxburn Athletic	1–3	2–0	2–2	1–1		2–3	0–2	3–2	1–0	1–0	2–1	1–1	2–4	4–2	1–1	2–1
Camelon Juniors	2–2	1–2	1–0	2–3	1–1		1–2	3–1	1–0	0–2	2–1	0–1	5–0	1–1	1–0	1–3
Carnoustie Panmure	5–2	1–1	1–2	1–3	0–1	0–5		2–2	2–1	2–3	0–2	1–2	0–2	4–2	3–2	3–1
Hill of Beath Hawthorn	4–1	0–0	0–1	2–2	3–2	1–1	5–1		2–0	1–3	5–0	4–0	1–2	4–3	2–2	3–1
Kelty Hearts	1–1	2–3	0–0	1–1	1–4	1–4	2–2	1–1		2–0	3–0	1–2	1–2	0–0	1–1	3–2
Linlithgow Rose	4–2	3–2	4–1	2–2	2–1	1–1	4–2	1–2	0–0		2–1	4–1	2–0	4–1	4–1	2–2
Lochee United	2–0	2–1	4–2	2–4	3–3	1–2	4–1	3–6	2–4	0–5		2–3	1–4	1–4	2–1	3–0
Musselburgh Athletic	0–1	5–0	3–3	1–1	1–2	1–1	4–1	0–1	2–3	0–1	4–2		2–3	1–1	3–2	3–1
Newtongrange Star	1–0	1–0	0–1	0–1	5–0	1–3	5–1	5–0	6–2	0–2	0–1	2–0		4–0	2–0	3–1
St Andrews United	1–1	1–1	0–2	1–1	0–3	1–0	0–3	0–1	2–2	1–3	2–3	3–3	1–0		1–2	3–1
Sauchie Juniors	2–0	4–0	0–1	0–4	5–2	0–1	2–1	2–0	2–1	0–3	1–5	1–3	1–3	4–2		1–1
Tayport	0–2	2–0	2–1	0–4	3–4	1–2	3–1	1–0	0–0	1–1	1–3	1–1	0–2	1–1	0–2	

Updated to match(es) played on 14 June 2014. Source: East Region SJFA
Legend: Blue = home team win; Yellow = draw; Red = away team win.

=== East Region Super/Premier League play-off ===
Kelty Hearts defeated Dalkeith Thistle, who finished third in the East Premier League, 5–0 on aggregate in the East Region Super/Premier League play-off to retain their Superleague status.

4 June 2014
19:15

Kelty Hearts	4 – 0	Dalkeith Thistle
Paul Shields 40'; Stuart Cargill 44' (pen.), 85'; Ross Philp 73'	Report

Central Park, Kelty
Referee: Lorraine Clark
11 June 2014
19:15

Dalkeith Thistle	0 – 1	Kelty Hearts
	Report	21' Stuart Cargill

Kings Park, Dalkeith
Referee: Evan Cairns
