= 2011–12 East Superleague =

ACA Sports East Superleague
- Season: 2011–12
- Dates: 27 August 2011 – 26 May 2012
- Champions: Bonnyrigg Rose Athletic
- Relegated: Bathgate Thistle
- Matches: 110
- Goals: 368 (3.35 per match)
- Biggest home win: Bonnyrigg Rose Athletic 5–0 Bathgate Thistle; 7 April 2012
- Biggest away win: Bathgate Thistle 1–7 Carnoustie Panmure; 14 April 2012
- Highest scoring: Linlithgow Rose 5–3 Bathgate Thistle; 18 February 2012; Bathgate Thistle 1–7 Carnoustie Panmure; 14 April 2012
- Longest winning run: Bathgate Thistle (4); 12 November 2011 – 14 January 2012; Linlithgow Rose; 18 February 2012 – 10 March 2012
- Longest unbeaten run: Hill of Beath Hawthorn (11); 3 September 2011 – 25 February 2012
- Longest losing run: Carnoustie Panmure (7); 24 September 2011 – 18 February 2012

The 2011–12 East Superleague (known as the ACA Sports East Superleague for sponsorship reasons) was the 11th season of the East Superleague, the top tier of league competition for SJFA East Region member clubs.

The season began on 27 August 2011 and ended on 26 May 2012. Bo'ness United were the reigning champions.

Only the bottom placed side was relegated to the East Premier League after Forfar West End were unable to guarantee fulfilment of their fixtures and withdrew from the league on 18 October 2011.

Bonnyrigg Rose Athletic won the championship on the final day of the season. As champions they entered the First Round of the 2012–13 Scottish Cup. Founder members Bathgate Thistle were relegated from the Superleague for the first time.

== Teams ==
=== To East Superleague ===
Promoted from East Premier League

- St Andrews United
- Carnoustie Panmure

=== From East Superleague ===
Relegated to East Premier League

- Newtongrange Star
- Tayport

=== Stadia and locations ===
| Club | Location | Ground | Manager | Finishing position 2010–11 |
|---|---|---|---|---|
| Bathgate Thistle | Bathgate | Creamery Park | Derek Strickland | 8th |
| Bo'ness United | Bo'ness | Newtown Park | Paul Ronald | Champions |
| Bonnyrigg Rose Athletic | Bonnyrigg | New Dundas Park | Max Christie | 4th |
| Camelon Juniors | Camelon | Carmuirs Park | Danny Smith | 10th |
| Carnoustie Panmure | Carnoustie | Laing Park | Ian Gilzean | East Premier League, 2nd |
| Hill of Beath Hawthorn | Hill of Beath | Keirs Park | Jock Finlayson | 2nd |
| Kelty Hearts | Kelty | Central Park | Keith Burgess | 9th |
| Linlithgow Rose | Linlithgow | Prestonfield | Mark Bradley | 3rd |
| Lochee United | Dundee | Thomson Park | Paul Ritchie | 5th |
| Musselburgh Athletic | Musselburgh | Olivebank Stadium | David McGlynn | 7th |
| St Andrews United | St Andrews | Recreation Park | Jim Hardie | East Premier League, 1st |

=== Managerial changes ===
| Club | Outgoing manager | Manner of departure | Date of vacancy | Position in table | Incoming manager | Date of appointment |
|---|---|---|---|---|---|---|
| Bathgate Thistle | Graeme Love | Sacked | 18 March 2012 | 5th | Derek Strickland | 20 April 2012 (season complete) |

== League table ==
| Pos | Team | Pld | W | D | L | GF | GA | GD | Pts | Qualification or relegation |
|---|---|---|---|---|---|---|---|---|---|---|
| 1 | Bonnyrigg Rose Athletic (C) | 20 | 13 | 4 | 3 | 48 | 23 | +25 | 43 | Qualification for 2012–13 Scottish Cup |
| 2 | Hill of Beath Hawthorn | 20 | 11 | 5 | 4 | 39 | 23 | +16 | 38 | |
| 3 | Linlithgow Rose | 20 | 10 | 5 | 5 | 42 | 32 | +10 | 35 | |
| 4 | Bo'ness United | 20 | 7 | 6 | 7 | 25 | 26 | −1 | 27 | |
| 5 | Kelty Hearts | 20 | 7 | 5 | 8 | 24 | 26 | −2 | 26 | |
| 6 | Camelon Juniors | 20 | 7 | 4 | 9 | 30 | 29 | +1 | 25 | |
| 7 | Lochee United | 20 | 7 | 3 | 10 | 32 | 37 | −5 | 24 | |
| 8 | Musselburgh Athletic | 20 | 6 | 4 | 10 | 41 | 45 | −4 | 22 | |
| 9 | St Andrews United | 20 | 6 | 4 | 10 | 28 | 40 | −12 | 22 | |
| 10 | Carnoustie Panmure | 20 | 5 | 6 | 9 | 32 | 39 | −7 | 21 | |
| 11 | Bathgate Thistle (R) | 20 | 5 | 6 | 9 | 27 | 48 | −21 | 21 | Relegation to East Premier League |
| 12 | Forfar West End | 0 | 0 | 0 | 0 | 0 | 0 | 0 | 0 (Note: Forfar West End went into abeyance on 18 October 2011 and resigned from the league. Their record (Pld4 W0 D0 L4 GF1 GA25 Pts0) was expunged.) | Club in abeyance, record expunged |

Source: East Region SJFA
Rules for classification: 1) points; 2) goal difference; 3) number of goals scored.
(C) Champions; (R) Relegated

== Results ==
| Home \ Away | BAT | BNS | BRG | CAM | CAR | FWE | HOB | KEL | LTH | LOC | MUS | STA |
|---|---|---|---|---|---|---|---|---|---|---|---|---|
| Bathgate Thistle | | 0–0 | 2–2 | 1–0 | 1–7 | | 0–3 | 1–0 | 1–2 | 0–2 | 3–3 | 2–1 |
| Bo'ness United | 1–1 | | 3–2 | 2–0 | 3–3 | | 1–1 | 1–0 | 2–2 | 2–4 | 0–3 | 3–0 |
| Bonnyrigg Rose Athletic | 5–0 | 2–0 | | 0–2 | 0–0 | | 0–2 | 2–1 | 3–1 | 4–1 | 4–1 | 5–2 |
| Camelon Juniors | 5–1 | 3–1 | 3–3 | | 2–0 | | 0–3 | 3–1 | 1–1 | 0–1 | 3–3 | 0–1 |
| Carnoustie Panmure | 2–2 | 1–0 | 0–1 | 1–4 | | | 1–3 | 2–2 | 3–2 | 1–3 | 2–2 | 1–1 |
| Forfar West End | | | | | | | | | | | | |
| Hill of Beath Hawthorn | 2–1 | 2–0 | 1–3 | 1–0 | 1–2 | | | 1–2 | 2–0 | 2–2 | 0–3 | 1–1 |
| Kelty Hearts | 2–2 | 0–2 | 0–1 | 1–0 | 0–2 | | 1–1 | | 2–1 | 3–1 | 1–3 | 2–0 |
| Linlithgow Rose | 5–3 | 1–1 | 2–2 | 4–1 | 3–1 | | 3–3 | 0–1 | | 1–0 | 3–1 | 3–1 |
| Lochee United | 1–2 | 0–2 | 1–3 | 1–2 | 2–1 | | 1–4 | 0–0 | 1–2 | | 3–3 | 1–2 |
| Musselburgh Athletic | 1–2 | 0–1 | 1–4 | 2–0 | 5–2 | | 2–4 | 1–3 | 1–3 | 0–3 | | 4–1 |
| St Andrews United | 4–2 | 1–0 | 0–2 | 1–1 | 2–0 | | 0–2 | 2–2 | 2–3 | 3–4 | 3–2 | |

Updated to match(es) played on 26 May 2012. Source: East Region SJFA
Legend: Blue = home team win; Yellow = draw; Red = away team win.
