= 2010–11 East Superleague =

ACA Sports East Superleague
- Season: 2010–11
- Champions: Bo'ness United
- Relegated: Tayport; Newtongrange Star
- Matches: 132
- Goals: 415 (3.14 per match)
- Biggest home win: Newtongrange Star 4–0 Hill of Beath Hawthorn; 20 November 2010; Tayport 4–0 Kelty Hearts; 20 November 2010; Newtongrange Star 4–0 Camelon Juniors; 26 February 2011
- Biggest away win: Musselburgh Athletic 1–5 Forfar West End; 20 November 2010; Tayport 0–4 Bo'ness United; 26 February 2011; Bo'ness United 0–4 Linlithgow Rose; 21 May 2011
- Highest scoring: Linlithgow Rose 4–3 Lochee United; 2 October 2010; Newtongrange Star 3–4 Linlithgow Rose; 16 October 2010; Musselburgh Athletic 3–4 Bathgate Thistle; 12 February 2011; Forfar West End 3–4 Newtongrange Star; 12 March 2011; Musselburgh Athletic 5–2 Camelon Juniors; 12 March 2011
- Longest winning run: Newtongrange Star (4); 20 November 2010 - 12 March 2011
- Longest unbeaten run: Hill of Beath Hawthorn (9); 26 March 2011 - 7 May 2011
- Longest losing run: Newtongrange Star (7); 4 September 2010 - 23 October 2010

The 2010–11 East Superleague (known as the ACA Sports East Superleague for sponsorship reasons) was the 10th season of the East Superleague, the top tier of league competition for SJFA East Region member clubs.

The season began on 21 August 2010 and ended on 4 June 2011. Bo'ness United were the reigning champions and became the first club to successfully defend their Superleague title. As champions they entered the First Round of the 2011–12 Scottish Cup.

== Teams ==
=== To East Superleague ===
Promoted from East Premier League

- Tayport
- Forfar West End

=== From East Superleague ===
Relegated to East Premier League

- Whitburn Juniors
- Glenrothes

== League table ==
Pos	Team	Pld	W	D	L	GF	GA	GD	Pts	Qualification or relegation
1	Bo'ness United (C)	22	12	6	4	38	26	+12	42	Qualification for 2011–12 Scottish Cup
2	Hill of Beath Hawthorn	22	10	9	3	33	22	+11	39	
3	Linlithgow Rose	22	12	3	7	46	37	+9	39	
4	Bonnyrigg Rose Athletic	22	11	4	7	33	31	+2	37	
5	Lochee United	22	10	5	7	37	30	+7	35	
6	Forfar West End	22	8	6	8	38	35	+3	30	
7	Musselburgh Athletic	22	8	3	11	36	46	−10	27	
8	Bathgate Thistle	22	6	8	8	33	40	−7	26	
9	Kelty Hearts	22	7	3	12	26	35	−9	24	
10	Camelon Juniors	22	6	6	10	32	43	−11	24	
11	Tayport (R)	22	6	4	12	30	33	−3	22	Relegation to East Premier League
12	Newtongrange Star (R)	22	6	3	13	33	37	−4	21	Relegation to East Premier League

Rules for classification: 1) points; 2) goal difference; 3) number of goals scored.
(C) Champions; (R) Relegated

== Results ==
Home \ Away	BAT	BNS	BRG	CAM	FWE	HOB	KEL	LTH	LOC	MUS	NEW	TAY
Bathgate Thistle		3–3	0–1	1–1	1–3	1–4	1–4	1–1	1–1	2–3	2–0	2–2
Bo'ness United	0–2		1–1	1–0	2–0	1–0	3–1	0–4	3–1	4–1	1–0	2–1
Bonnyrigg Rose Athletic	2–0	2–2		2–3	1–1	0–2	2–1	0–3	2–3	2–2	3–2	1–0
Camelon Juniors	1–1	2–0	1–3		2–2	1–1	2–0	3–2	2–3	1–2	2–2	3–2
Forfar West End	0–1	0–2	4–1	1–1		1–1	0–2	1–0	3–2	2–0	3–4	1–1
Hill of Beath Hawthorn	4–1	2–2	3–1	1–0	1–0		2–0	2–1	1–1	3–1	0–0	0–3
Kelty Hearts	2–4	2–2	0–1	3–1	0–2	0–0		3–0	1–2	2–1	1–0	0–2
Linlithgow Rose	4–2	2–1	2–4	2–1	2–1	2–2	2–0		4–3	2–1	1–2	2–3
Lochee United	0–2	0–1	0–1	4–1	3–0	0–0	1–1	2–2		2–0	0–1	2–1
Musselburgh Athletic	3–4	2–2	0–2	5–2	1–5	1–1	1–0	2–3	0–2		4–2	2–1
Newtongrange Star	1–1	0–1	1–0	4–0	1–2	4–0	2–3	3–4	2–3	1–2		1–2
Tayport	0–0	0–4	0–1	1–2	2–2	1–3	4–0	0–1	1–2	1–2	2–0	

Legend: Blue = home team win; Yellow = draw; Red = away team win.
