= 2010–11 in Scottish football =

Football in Scotland
- Season: 2010–11

2010–11 in Scottish football

Premier League champions
- Rangers

First Division champions
- Dunfermline Athletic

Second Division champions
- Livingston

Third Division champions
- Arbroath

Scottish Cup winners
- Celtic

League Cup winners
- Rangers

Challenge Cup winners
- Ross County

Youth Cup winners
- Celtic

Teams in Europe
- Dundee United, Celtic, Hibernian, Motherwell, Rangers

Scotland national team
- Euro 2012 qualifying

The 2010–11 season was the 114th season of competitive football in Scotland.

== Overview ==
- Rangers won the SPL title, pipping rivals Celtic on the final day of the season, their third title in a row and their 54th Scottish league championship. It was Walter Smith's final season as manager of Rangers.
- Inverness Caledonian Thistle are competing in the Scottish Premier League for the sixth time, their last season in the top-flight since the 2008–09 season, after being promoted as First Division champions last season.
- Stirling Albion are competing in the First Division after being promoted as Second Division champions.
- Arbroath won the Third Division, the first title in the club's 133-year history.

== League Competitions ==
=== Scottish Premier League ===
Pos	Team	Pld	W	D	L	GF	GA	GD	Pts	Qualification or relegation
1	Rangers (C)	38	30	3	5	88	29	+59	93	Qualification for the Champions League third qualifying round
2	Celtic	38	29	5	4	85	22	+63	92	Qualification for the Europa League play-off round (Note: Celtic entered the play-off round of the 2011–12 UEFA Europa League as they won the 2011 Scottish Cup Final. Due to this, Heart of Midlothian also moved up to the third qualifying round, whilst fourth-placed team Dundee United received the second qualifying round spot.)
3	Heart of Midlothian	38	18	9	11	53	45	+8	63	Qualification for the Europa League third qualifying round
4	Dundee United	38	17	10	11	55	50	+5	61	Qualification for the Europa League second qualifying round
5	Kilmarnock	38	13	10	15	53	55	−2	49	
6	Motherwell	38	13	7	18	40	60	−20	46	
7	Inverness Caledonian Thistle	38	14	11	13	52	44	+8	53	
8	St Johnstone	38	11	11	16	23	43	−20	44	
9	Aberdeen	38	11	5	22	39	59	−20	38	
10	Hibernian	38	10	7	21	39	61	−22	37	
11	St Mirren	38	8	9	21	33	57	−24	33	
12	Hamilton Academical (R)	38	5	11	22	24	59	−35	26	Relegation to the First Division

Source: SPFL Archive
Rules for classification: 1) points; 2) goal difference; 3) number of goals scored.
(C) Champions; (R) Relegated

=== Scottish First Division ===
Pos	Team	Pld	W	D	L	GF	GA	GD	Pts	Promotion, qualification or relegation
1	Dunfermline Athletic (C, P)	36	20	10	6	66	31	+35	70	Promotion to the Premier League
2	Raith Rovers	36	17	9	10	47	35	+12	60	
3	Falkirk	36	17	7	12	57	41	+16	58	
4	Queen of the South	36	14	7	15	54	53	+1	49	
5	Partick Thistle	36	12	11	13	44	39	+5	47	
6	Dundee	36	19	12	5	54	34	+20	44 (Note: Dundee were docked 25 points for entering administration. The deduction was temporarily lifted pending an appeal by the club, however the appeal failed and the deduction was reinstated.)	
7	Greenock Morton	36	11	10	15	39	43	−4	43	
8	Ross County	36	9	14	13	30	34	−4	41	
9	Cowdenbeath (R)	36	9	8	19	41	72	−31	35	Qualification for the First Division play-offs
10	Stirling Albion (R)	36	4	8	24	32	82	−50	20	Relegation to the Second Division

Source: SPFL
Rules for classification: 1) points; 2) goal difference; 3) number of goals scored.
(C) Champions; (P) Promoted; (R) Relegated

=== Scottish Second Division ===
Pos	Team	Pld	W	D	L	GF	GA	GD	Pts	Promotion, qualification or relegation
1	Livingston (C, P)	36	25	7	4	79	33	+46	82	Promotion to the First Division
2	Ayr United (O, P)	36	18	5	13	62	55	+7	59	Qualification for the First Division play-offs
3	Forfar Athletic	36	17	8	11	50	48	+2	59	Qualification for the First Division play-offs
4	Brechin City	36	15	12	9	63	45	+18	57	Qualification for the First Division play-offs
5	East Fife	36	14	10	12	77	60	+17	52	
6	Airdrie United	36	13	9	14	52	60	−8	48	
7	Dumbarton	36	11	7	18	52	70	−18	40	
8	Stenhousemuir	36	10	8	18	46	59	−13	38	
9	Alloa Athletic (R)	36	9	9	18	49	71	−22	36	Qualification for the Second Division play-offs
10	Peterhead (R)	36	5	11	20	47	76	−29	26	Relegation to the Third Division

Source: SPFL
Rules for classification: 1) points; 2) goal difference; 3) number of goals scored.
(C) Champions; (O) Play-off winners; (P) Promoted; (R) Relegated

=== Scottish Third Division ===
Pos	Team	Pld	W	D	L	GF	GA	GD	Pts	Promotion or qualification
1	Arbroath (C, P)	36	20	6	10	80	61	+19	66	Promotion to the Second Division
2	Albion Rovers (O, P)	36	17	10	9	56	40	+16	61	Qualification for the Second Division Play-offs
3	Queen's Park	36	18	5	13	57	43	+14	59	Qualification for the Second Division Play-offs
4	Annan Athletic	36	16	11	9	58	45	+13	59	Qualification for the Second Division Play-offs
5	Stranraer	36	15	12	9	72	57	+15	57	
6	Berwick Rangers	36	12	13	11	62	56	+6	49	
7	Elgin City	36	13	6	17	53	63	−10	45	
8	Montrose	36	10	7	19	47	61	−14	37	
9	East Stirlingshire	36	10	4	22	33	62	−29	34	
10	Clyde	36	8	8	20	37	67	−30	32	

Source: SPFL
Rules for classification: 1) points; 2) goal difference; 3) number of goals scored.
(C) Champions; (O) Play-off winners; (P) Promoted

=== Scottish Premier Under-19 League ===
Pos	Team	Pld	W	D	L	GF	GA	GD	Pts
1	Celtic (C)	22	17	3	2	74	16	+58	54
2	Heart of Midlothian	22	17	1	4	53	23	+30	52
3	Rangers	22	14	3	5	48	26	+22	45
4	Aberdeen	22	12	5	5	40	32	+8	41
5	Hibernian	22	8	5	9	32	34	−2	29
6	Motherwell	22	8	3	11	27	43	−16	27
7	St Johnstone	22	7	7	8	27	28	−1	28
8	St Mirren	22	8	4	10	22	39	−17	28
9	Dundee United	22	5	5	12	24	37	−13	20
10	Kilmarnock	22	6	2	14	32	61	−29	20
11	Hamilton Academical (R)	22	5	3	14	31	43	−12	18
12	Inverness Caledonian Thistle	22	4	1	17	24	52	−28	13

Updated to match(es) played on 30 April 2011. Source: Scotprem
Rules for classification: 1) points; 2) goal difference; 3) number of goals scored.
Team, which his senior will place 12th in Scottish Premier League at the end of this season will be relegated from Scottish Premier Under-19 League and his place will be for junior team of new SPL club. Bottom SPL club is Hamilton Academical.
(C) Champions; (R) Relegated

== Honours ==
=== Cup honours ===
Competition	Winner	Score	Runner-up	Match report
2010–11 Scottish Cup	Celtic	3 – 0	Motherwell	BBC Sport
2010–11 League Cup	Rangers	2 – 1	Celtic	BBC Sport
2010–11 Challenge Cup	Ross County	2 – 0	Queen of the South	BBC Sport
2010–11 Youth Cup	Celtic	2 – 1	Rangers	BBC Sport
2010–11 Junior Cup	Auchinleck Talbot	2 – 1 (after extra time)	Musselburgh Athletic	BBC Sport

=== Non-league honours ===
==== Senior ====
Competition	Winner
2010–11 Highland League	Buckie Thistle
East of Scotland League	Spartans
South of Scotland League	Threave Rovers

==== Junior ====
West Region

Division	Winner
2010–11 Premier Division	Irvine Meadow
Division One	Ashfield
Ayrshire League	Ardrossan Winton Rovers
Central League Division One	Kilsyth Rangers
Central League Division Two	Yoker Athletic

East Region

Division	Winner
2010–11 Superleague	Bo'ness United
Premier League	St Andrews United
North Division	Downfield
Central Division	Oakley United
South Division	Sauchie Juniors

North Region

Division	Winner
2010–11 Superleague	Culter
Division One	Inverness City
Division Two	Parkvale

=== Individual honours ===
==== PFA Scotland awards ====
Award	Winner	Team
Players' Player of the Year	Emilio Izaguirre	Celtic
Young Player of the Year	David Goodwillie	Dundee United
Manager of the Year	John McGlynn	Raith Rovers
First Division Player	John Baird	Raith Rovers
Second Division Player	Rory McAllister	Brechin City
Third Division Player	Gavin Swankie	Arbroath

==== SFWA awards ====
Award	Winner	Team
Footballer of the Year	Emilio Izaguirre	Celtic
Young Player of the Year	David Goodwillie	Dundee United
Manager of the Year	Mixu Paatelainen	Kilmarnock
International Player of the Year	Allan McGregor	Rangers

== Scottish clubs in Europe ==
=== Summary ===
Club	Competitions	Final round	Coef.	Top Scorer
Rangers	UEFA Champions League; UEFA Europa League	Group Stage; Round of 16	12.0	(United States) Maurice Edu, 2
Celtic	UEFA Champions League; UEFA Europa League	Third qualifying round Play-off round	2.0	(Mexico) Efraín Juárez, 2
Dundee United	UEFA Europa League	Play-off round	0.5	(Republic of Ireland) Jon Daly, 1
Hibernian	UEFA Europa League	Third qualifying round	0.0	(Netherlands) Edwin de Graaf, 2
Motherwell	UEFA Europa League	Play-off round	3.5	(Scotland) Jamie Murphy, 3
Total			18.0	
Average			3.6	

- All teams had been eliminated.
- Current UEFA coefficients: Ranking

=== Rangers ===
2010–11 UEFA Champions League

14 September 2011 Group stage	Manchester United (England)	0 – 0	(Scotland) Rangers	Old Trafford, Manchester
19:45 BST (UTC+01)		BBC Sport		Attendance: 74,408; Referee: Olegário Benquerença

29 September 2011 Group stage	Rangers (Scotland)	1 – 0	(Turkey) Bursaspor	Ibrox Park, Glasgow
19:45 BST (UTC+01)	Naismith 18'	BBC Sport		Attendance: 41,905; Referee: Serge Gumienny

20 October 2011 Group stage	Rangers (Scotland)	1 – 1	(Spain) Valencia	Ibrox Park, Glasgow
19:45 BST (UTC+01)	Edu 34'	BBC Sport	Edu 34' (o.g.)	Attendance: 45,153; Referee: Nicola Rizzoli

2 November 2011 Group stage	Valencia (Spain)	3 – 0	(Scotland) Rangers	Estadio Mestalla, Valencia
19:45 BST (UTC+01)	Soldado 34', 71'; Costa 90'	BBC Sport		Attendance: 25,000; Referee: Felix Brych

24 November 2011 Group stage	Rangers (Scotland)	0 – 1	(England) Manchester United	Ibrox Park, Glasgow
19:45 BST (UTC+01)		BBC Sport	Rooney 87' (pen.)	Attendance: 49,764; Referee: Massimo Busacca

7 December 2011 Group stage	Bursaspor (Turkey)	1 – 1	(Scotland) Rangers	Bursa Atatürk Stadium, Bursa
19:45 BST (UTC+01)	Yıldırım 79'	BBC Sport	Miller 19'	Attendance: 22,000; Referee: Tony Chapron

2010–11 UEFA Europa League

17 February 2011 Round of 32	Rangers (Scotland)	1 – 1	(Portugal) Sporting CP	Ibrox Park, Glasgow
19:45 BST (UTC+01)	Whittaker 66'	BBC Sport	Fernández 89'	Attendance: 34,095; Referee: Manuel Gräfe

24 February 2011 Round of 32	Sporting CP (Portugal)	2 – 2 (3 – 3 agg.)	(Scotland) Rangers	Estádio José Alvalade, Lisbon
19:45 BST (UTC+01)	Mendes 42'; Djaló 83'	BBC Sport	Diouf 20'; Edu 90+2'	Attendance: 15,375; Referee: Paolo Tagliavento

10 March 2011 Round of 16	PSV Eindhoven (Netherlands)	0 – 0	(Scotland) Rangers	Philips Stadion, Eindhoven
19:45 BST (UTC+01)		BBC Sport		Attendance: 30,000; Referee: Martin Hansson

17 March 2011 Round of 16	Rangers (Scotland)	0 – 1 (0 – 1 agg.)	(Netherlands) PSV Eindhoven	Ibrox Park, Glasgow
19:45 BST (UTC+01)		BBC Sport	Lens 13'	Attendance: 35,373; Referee: Robert Schorgenhofer

=== Celtic ===
2010–11 UEFA Champions League

28 July 2011 Third qualifying round	(Portugal) Braga	3 – 0	(Scotland) Celtic	Estádio Municipal de Braga, Braga
19:45 BST (UTC+01)	Alan 26' (pen.); Echiéjilé 76'; Nascimento 89'	BBC Report		Attendance: 12,295; Referee: Serge Gumienny

4 August 2011 Third qualifying round	Celtic (Scotland)	2 – 1 (2 – 4 agg.)	(Portugal) Braga	Celtic Park, Glasgow
19:45 BST (UTC+01)	Hooper 57'; Juárez 78'	BBC Sport	Paulo César 20'	Attendance: 52,000; Referee: Ivan Bebek

2010–11 UEFA Europa League

19 August 2011 Play-off round	Celtic (Scotland)	2 – 0	(Netherlands) Utrecht	Celtic Park, Glasgow
19:45 BST (UTC+01)	Juárez 19'; Samaras 34'	BBC Sport		Attendance: 35,755; Referee: Svein Oddvar Moen

26 August 2011 Play-off round	(Netherlands) Utrecht	4 – 0 (4 – 2 agg.)	Celtic (Scotland)	Stadion Galgenwaard, Utrecht
19:45 BST (UTC+01)	van Wolfswinkel 12' (pen.), 20' (pen.), 47'; Maguire 63'	BBC Sport		Attendance: 18,000; Referee: Carlos Velasco Carballo

=== Dundee United ===
2010–11 UEFA Europa League

19 August 2011 Play-off round	(Scotland) Dundee United	0 – 1	AEK Athens (Greece)	Tannadice Park, Dundee
19:45 BST (UTC+01)		BBC Sport	Djebbour 11'	Attendance: 12,116; Referee: Marijo Strahonja

26 August 2011 Play-off round	(Greece) AEK Athens	1 – 1 (2 – 1 agg.)	Dundee United (Scotland)	Karaiskakis Stadium, Pireus
19:45 BST (UTC+01)	Diop 23'	BBC Sport	Daly 78'	Attendance: 600; Referee: Libor Kovařík

=== Hibernian ===
2010–11 UEFA Europa League

29 July 2011 Third qualifying round	Maribor (Slovenia)	3–0	(Scotland) Hibernian	Maribor
19:45 BST (UTC+01)		Report	Iličić 32', 52'; Tavares 60'	Stadium: Ljudski vrt Attendance: 10,000; Referee: Martin Ingvarsson

5 August 2011 Third qualifying round	Hibernian (Scotland)	2–3 (2–6 agg.)	(Slovenia) Maribor	Edinburgh
19:45 BST (UTC+01)	de Graaf 54', 89'	BBC Report	Tavares 19', 73'; Mezga 67' (pen.)	Stadium: Easter Road; Attendance: 12,504; Referee: Clément Turpin

=== Motherwell ===
2010–11 UEFA Europa League

15 July 2011 Second qualifying round	(Scotland) Motherwell	1 - 0	Breiðablik (Iceland)	Fir Park, Motherwell
19:45 BST (UTC+01)	Forbes 63'	BBC Report		Attendance: 5,990; Referee: Richard Liesveld

22 July 2011 Second qualifying round	(Iceland) Breiðablik	0 - 1 (0 - 2 agg.)	Motherwell (Scotland)	Kópavogsvöllur, Kópavogur
19:45 BST (UTC+01)		BBC Report	Murphy 42'	Attendance: 1,700; Referee: Carlos Miguel Taborda Xistra

29 July 2011 Third qualifying round	(Norway) Aalesunds	1 - 1	Motherwell (Scotland)	Color Line Stadion, Ålesund
19:45 BST (UTC+01)	Mathisen 90+3'	BBC Sport	Murphy 48'	Attendance: 8,450; Referee: Toussaint

5 August 2011 Third qualifying round	(Scotland) Motherwell	3 - 0 (4 - 1 agg.)	Aalesunds (Norway)	Fir Park, Motherwell
19:45 BST (UTC+01)	Murphy 4'; Sutton 13'; Page 89'	BBC Report		Attendance: 7,721; Referee: Richard Trutz

19 August 2011 Play-off round	(Denmark) Odense	2 - 1	Motherwell (Scotland)	TRE-FOR Park, Odense
19:45 BST (UTC+01)	Sørensen 31'; Utaka 78'	BBC Sport	Hateley 90+4'	Attendance: 14,911; Referee: Zsolt Szabó

26 August 2011 Play-off round	(Scotland) Motherwell	0 - 1 (1 - 3 agg.)	Odense (Denmark)	Fir Park, Motherwell
19:45 BST (UTC+01)		BBC Sport	Utaka 28'	Attendance: 9,105; Referee: Michael Koukoulakis

== National teams ==
=== Scotland national team ===
Date	Venue	Opponents	Score	Competition	Scotland scorers	Report
11 August 2010	Råsunda Stadium, Stockholm (A)	Sweden	0–3	Friendly		BBC Sport
3 September 2010	S.Darius and S.Girėnas Stadium, Kaunas (A)	Lithuania	0–0	Euro 2012 Q		BBC Sport
7 September 2010	Hampden Park, Glasgow (H)	Liechtenstein	2–1	Euro 2012 Q	Miller, McManus	BBC Sport
8 October 2010	Stadion Letná, Prague (A)	Czech Republic	0–1	Euro 2012 Q		BBC Sport
12 October 2010	Hampden Park, Glasgow (H)	Spain	2–3	Euro 2012 Q	Naismith, Pique (o.g.)	BBC Sport
16 November 2010	Pittodrie Stadium, Aberdeen (H)	Faroe Islands	3–0	Friendly	Wilson, Commons, Mackie	BBC Sport
9 February 2011	Aviva Stadium, Dublin (N)	Northern Ireland	3–0	2011 Nations Cup	Miller, McArthur, Commons	BBC Sport
27 March 2011	Emirates Stadium, London (N)	Brazil	0–2	Friendly		BBC Sport
25 May 2011	Aviva Stadium, Dublin (N)	Wales	3–1	2011 Nations Cup	Morrison, Miller, Berra	BBC Sport
29 May 2011	Aviva Stadium, Dublin (A)	Republic of Ireland	0–1	2011 Nations Cup		BBC Sport

=== Scotland Under-21 team ===
Date	Venue	Opponents	Score	Competition	Scotland scorers	Report
11 August 2010	New St Mirren Park, Paisley (H)	Sweden	1–1	Friendly	Wotherspoon	Scottish FA
3 September 2010	Haradzki Stadium, Barysaw (A)	Belarus	1–1	2011 Under-21 Championship Q	Maguire	Scottish FA
7 September 2010	Pittodrie Stadium, Aberdeen (H)	Austria	2–1	2011 Under-21 Championship Q	Bannan, Maguire	Scottish FA
7 October 2010	Laugardalsvöllur, Reykjavík (A)	Iceland	1–2	2011 Under-21 Championship Q	Murphy	Scottish FA
11 October 2010	Easter Road, Edinburgh (H)	Iceland	1–2	2011 Under-21 Championship Q	Maguire	Scottish FA
17 November 2010	Firhill Stadium, Glasgow (H)	Northern Ireland	3–1	Friendly	Griffiths, Hanlon, Ross	Scottish FA

== Deaths ==
- 29 July – Alex Wilson, 76, Portsmouth and Scotland defender.
- 2 September – Jackie Sinclair, 67, Dunfermline and Scotland winger.
- 30 October – John Benson, 67, Manchester City, Torquay United, Bournemouth, Exeter City and Norwich City defender; Bournemouth, Manchester City, Burnley and Wigan Athletic manager.
- 10 November – Jim Farry, 56, Scottish Football League secretary (1979–1990) and Scottish Football Association chief executive (1990–1999).
- 18 November – Jim Cruickshank, 69, Queen's Park, Hearts, Dumbarton and Scotland goalkeeper.
- 28 December – Avi Cohen, 54, Rangers defender.
- 24 January – Alec Boden, 85, Celtic and Ayr United defender.
- 27 January – Svein Mathisen, 58, Norwegian player who made three appearances for Hibernian in 1978.
- 10 March – Danny Paton, 75, Hearts forward.
- 4 April – John Niven, 89, East Fife and Kilmarnock goalkeeper.
- 6 April – Jim Blair, 64, St Mirren and Hibs forward.
- 11 April – Jimmy Briggs, 74, Dundee United defender.
- 12 April – Ronnie Coyle, 46, Raith Rovers, Celtic, Ayr United, Clyde, East Fife and Queen's Park defender.
- 20 April – Allan Brown, 84, East Fife and Scotland forward.
- 28 April – Willie O'Neill, 70, Celtic defender.
- 30 April – Eddie Turnbull, 88, Hibernian and Scotland player; manager of Queen's Park, Aberdeen and Hibernian.
- 5 May – Dougie McCracken, 46, Ayr United, Dumbarton and East Fife player.
- 5 May – Tommy Wright, 83, Partick Thistle, East Fife and Scotland winger.
- 14 May – Ernie Walker, 83, Secretary of the Scottish Football Association from 1977 to 1990.
- 30 May – Eddie Morrison, 63, Kilmarnock and Morton forward; Kilmarnock manager.
