= 2020–21 Scottish Cup =

Tournament details
- Country: Scotland
- Teams: 100 (106 initially entered)

Final positions
- Champions: St Johnstone
- Runners-up: Hibernian

Tournament statistics
- Matches played: 99
- Goals scored: 365 (3.69 per match)
- All statistics correct as of 23 May 2021.

The 2020–21 Scottish Cup was the 136th season of Scotland's most prestigious football knockout competition. The tournament did not have a sponsor, after William Hill's nine-year partnership with the Scottish FA came to an end following the 2019–20 tournament.

This was the second season in which a match from every round of the tournament proper was broadcast live via TV partners Premier Sports and BBC Scotland, with one match in the first and second rounds being shown live on the BBC Scotland channel for the second time.

The defending champions were Celtic, who won the 2020 Scottish Cup Final on 20 December 2020. Celtic lost to their Old Firm rivals Rangers in the fourth round, which was their first defeat in the competition since 2015–16.

St Johnstone were the winners of the Scottish Cup, beating Hibernian 1–0 in the final on 22 May to complete a historic cup Double, becoming only the 2nd ever team outside of the Old Firm to do so since Aberdeen in the 1989–90 season.

== Calendar ==
The calendar for the 2020–21 Scottish Cup, as announced by Scottish Football Association on 27 October 2020. On 11 January 2021, the competition was suspended by the Scottish FA due to the COVID-19 pandemic in Scotland. On 3 March 2021, new dates for the competition were announced.

The format featured several changes from the previous season because of the increased number of eligible clubs and the tournament's compressed schedule. Due to the potential for fixture congestion during the COVID-19 pandemic, replays were not played during the 2020–21 competition.

Round	Original date	Number of fixtures	Clubs	New Entries	Leagues entering at this round
Preliminary round one	28 November 2020	2	100 → 98	26	
Preliminary round two	12 December 2020	26	98 → 72	28	14 Highland League teams 14 Lowland League teams
First round	26 December 2020	20	72 → 52	14	2 Highland League teams 2 Lowland League teams 10 League Two teams
Second round	9 January 2021	20	52 → 32	20	10 Championship; 10 League One teams
Third round	~~30 January~~; 3 April 2021	16	32 → 16	12	12 Premiership teams
Fourth round	~~20 February~~; 17 April 2021	8	16 → 8	None	
Quarter-finals	~~13 March~~; 24 April 2021	4	8 → 4	None	
Semi-finals	~~10 April~~; 8 May 2021	2	4 → 2	None	
Final	~~8 May~~; 22 May 2021	1	2 → 1	None	

== Preliminary rounds ==
=== Preliminary round one ===
The first preliminary round took place on the weekend of 28 November 2020. There were 26 entries at this stage - 20 from the East of Scotland Football League, 4 from the South of Scotland Football League, 1 from the West of Scotland Football League and 1 from the SJFA North Region. 22 clubs with a valid club licence received a bye to the next round.

Dunipace, Haddington Athletic, Newtongrange Star, and Tranent Juniors took part in the Scottish Cup for the first time having each gained their Club Licence, along with Musselburgh Athletic who made their debut as 2019–20 South & East Cup-Winners Shield winners.

Auchinleck Talbot, Burntisland Shipyard, Girvan, and Golspie Sutherland withdrew from the competition after the initial format was announced.

Clubs marked ‡ were ineligible for a bye to the second preliminary round.

==== Draw ====
East of Scotland League	South of Scotland League	West of Scotland League	Others
Blackburn United; Broxburn Athletic; Camelon Juniors; Coldstream; Dundonald Bluebell; Dunipace; Easthouses Lily Miners Welfare; Haddington Athletic; Hawick Royal Albert United; Hill of Beath Hawthorn; Jeanfield Swifts; Linlithgow Rose; Lothian Thistle Hutchison Vale; Musselburgh Athletic ‡; Newtongrange Star; Penicuik Athletic; Preston Athletic; Tranent Juniors; Tynecastle; Whitehill Welfare	Newton Stewart; St Cuthbert Wanderers; Threave Rovers; Wigtown & Bladnoch	Glasgow University	SJFA North Region: Banks O' Dee

Banks O' Dee, Blackburn United, Broxburn Athletic, Camelon Juniors, Coldstream, Dundonald Bluebell, Dunipace, Easthouses Lily Miners Welfare, Glasgow University, Haddington Athletic, Hawick Royal Albert United, Hill of Beath Hawthorn, Jeanfield Swifts, Linlithgow Rose, Newton Stewart, Newtongrange Star, Preston Athletic, Threave Rovers, Tranent Juniors, Tynecastle, Whitehill Welfare and Wigtown & Bladnoch received a bye to the second preliminary round.

==== Matches ====
28 November 2020	Penicuik Athletic	**2–3** (a.e.t.)	**Musselburgh Athletic**	Penicuik
14:30	Somerville 7', 84'		Moffat 5'; King 49'; Downie 108'	Stadium: Penicuik Park; Referee: Chris Gentles

28 November 2020	**Lothian Thistle Hutchison Vale**	**2–1** (a.e.t.)	St Cuthbert Wanderers	Edinburgh
15:00	Mbewe 90'; Ross 97'		Deland 59' (o.g.)	Stadium: Saughton Enclosure; Referee: Connor Ashwood

=== Preliminary round two ===
The second preliminary round took place on the weekend of 12 December 2020. Along with the two winners from the first preliminary round and 22 teams with byes, there were 28 new entries at this stage - 14 from the Highland Football League and 14 from the Lowland Football League.

Forres Mechanics and Gretna 2008 withdrew from the competition after the initial format was announced.

==== Draw ====
Teams in Italics were unknown at the time of the draw. Teams in Bold advanced to the first round.

Highland League	Lowland League	East of Scotland League	Other
**Buckie Thistle**; Clachnacuddin; Deveronvale; **Formartine United**; Fort William; **Huntly**; Inverurie Loco Works; **Keith**; Lossiemouth; **Nairn County**; **Rothes**; Strathspey Thistle; Turriff United; **Wick Academy**	**Berwick Rangers**; **Bo'ness United**; BSC Glasgow; **Caledonian Braves**; **Civil Service Strollers**; **Cumbernauld Colts**; Dalbeattie Star; East Kilbride; **East Stirlingshire**; Edinburgh University; **Gala Fairydean Rovers**; **The Spartans**; University of Stirling; Vale of Leithen	Blackburn United; **Broxburn Athletic**; **Camelon Juniors**; Coldstream; **Dundonald Bluebell**; Dunipace; Easthouses Lily Miners Welfare; **Haddington Athletic**; Hawick Royal Albert United; **Hill of Beath Hawthorn**; **Jeanfield Swifts**; **Linlithgow Rose**; **Lothian Thistle Hutchison Vale**; Musselburgh Athletic; Newtongrange Star; **Preston Athletic**; **Tranent Juniors**; Tynecastle; Whitehill Welfare	South of Scotland League: Newton Stewart; Threave Rovers; Wigtown & Bladnoch; West of Scotland League: Glasgow University; SJFA North Region: **Banks O' Dee**

==== Matches ====
12 December 2020	**Jeanfield Swifts**	**3–1**	University of Stirling	Perth
12:30	Whitehead 3'; Scott 15'; Reid 22'		Brown 90'	Stadium: Riverside Stadium; Referee: Gary Hanvidge

12 December 2020	**Dundonald Bluebell**	**4–2**	Easthouses Lily Miners Welfare	Kirkcaldy
14:00	Wedderburn 11'; Durie 27'; Cargill 49'; McKenzie 56'		McDermott 64'; Hunter 85'	Stadium: Stark's Park; Referee: Andrew Bryson

12 December 2020	**Hill of Beath Hawthorn**	**2–1**	Whitehill Welfare	Hill of Beath
14:30	Connelly 7'; Mitchell 9'		Hornig 14'	Stadium: Keir's Park; Referee: Keiran Trayner

12 December 2020	**Banks O' Dee**	**6–1**	Vale of Leithen	Aberdeen
15:00	Henderson 10'; H. MacLeod 21', 55'; Gilmour 47'; L. MacLeod 52', 78'		Robertson 87'	Stadium: Spain Park; Referee: Ryan Lee

12 December 2020	Blackburn United	**1–1** (a.e.t.) (**2–4** p)	**Civil Service Strollers**	Blackburn
15:00	Redfern 44'		Moffat 53'	Stadium: New Murrayfield Park; Referee: Steven MacDonald

12 December 2020	BSC Glasgow	**2–3**	**Haddington Athletic**	Alloa
15:00	Geggan 6'; Hughes 83'		Lyon 59' (o.g.); Auriemma 74'; Harris 80'	Stadium: Recreation Park; Referee: Calum Haswell

12 December 2020	Clachnacuddin	**1–2**	**Caledonian Braves**	Inverness
15:00	Callum 63'		Forrester 6'; McNeil 76'	Stadium: Grant Street Park; Referee: Craig Wilson

12 December 2020	Deveronvale	**1–4**	**Camelon Juniors**	Banff
15:00	Noble 81'		McMullan 29', 57'; Docherty 42'; Stowe 51'	Stadium: Princess Royal Park; Referee: Colin Whyte

12 December 2020	Dunipace	**1–3**	**Berwick Rangers**	Denny
15:00	Davidson 27'		Nelson 31'; Waugh 54'; Allan 59'	Stadium: Westfield Park; Referee: John Stewart

12 December 2020	**East Stirlingshire**	**5–0**	Inverurie Loco Works	Falkirk
15:00	Dishington 35'; Brown 58', 90'; Tapping 68'; Low 71'			Stadium: Falkirk Stadium; Referee: Liam Duncan

12 December 2020	Edinburgh University	**1–2**	**Tranent Juniors**	Edinburgh
15:00	Anderson 89'		Ponton 72'; Lander 76'	Stadium: East Peffermill; Referee: Duncan Nicolson

12 December 2020	**Gala Fairydean Rovers**	**6–0**	Wigtown & Bladnoch	Galashiels
15:00	Campbell 11', 42'; Galbraith 41'; Addison 70'; Herdman 81'; Walsh 90'			Stadium: Netherdale; Referee: Ross Hardie

12 December 2020	**Huntly**	**3–0**	Dalbeattie Star	Huntly
15:00	McGowan 24'; McKeown 41', 54'			Stadium: Christie Park; Referee: Iain Snedden

12 December 2020	**Keith**	**5–1**	Fort William	Keith
15:00	Keith 11', 14'; Watt 65'; Duncan 82'; Brownie 90'		McConnell 35'	Stadium: Kynoch Park; Referee: Ross Birrell

12 December 2020	**Lothian Thistle Hutchison Vale**	**4–4** (a.e.t.) (**4–2** p)	Lossiemouth	Livingston
15:00	Cunningham 1'; Cumming 8'; Wringe 49'; Mbewe 110'		Sewell 43'; Stuart 81'; Charlesworth 88'; MacAuley 101'	Stadium: Almondvale Stadium; Referee: Euan Birch

12 December 2020	**Nairn County**	**4–0**	Threave Rovers	Nairn
15:00	Dingwall 2'; Davidson 41'; Shewan 63'; McKenzie 81'			Stadium: Station Park; Referee: Daniel Graves

12 December 2020	Newtongrange Star	**0–4**	**Rothes**	Newtongrange
15:00			Harkness 10'; Linden 14'; Sutherland 49', 57'	Stadium: New Victoria Park; Referee: Greg Soutar

12 December 2020	Newton Stewart	**0–3**	**Broxburn Athletic**	Newton Stewart
15:00			Greenhill 42', 85'; Binnie 74'	Stadium: Blairmount Park; Referee: Alex Shepherd

12 December 2020	Strathspey Thistle	**0–4**	**Buckie Thistle**	Grantown-on-Spey
15:00			Fraser 12'; MacLeod 23'; McCabe 51'; MacAskill 90'	Stadium: Seafield Park; Referee: Stewart Luke

12 December 2020	**The Spartans**	**2–1**	East Kilbride	Edinburgh
15:00	McCrory-Irving 13'; Maxwell 85'		Healy 5'	Stadium: Ainslie Park; Referee: Paul Timmons

12 December 2020	Tynecastle	**2–3**	**Cumbernauld Colts**	Edinburgh
15:00	Hendry 36'; Beaumont 54'		MacPherson 25'; Murray 33'; Team 51'	Stadium: Meggetland Sports Complex; Referee: Scott Leslie

13 December 2020	Glasgow University	**1–2**	**Linlithgow Rose**	Airdrie
16:00	Baxter 36'		Coyne 61', 84'	Stadium: Excelsior Stadium; Referee: Alastair Grieve

16 December 2020	**Preston Athletic**	**3–2**	Hawick Royal Albert United	Prestonpans
19:30	Murray 49'; Jack 70'; Williams 78'		Gillie 43'; Steele 89'	Stadium: Pennypit Park; Referee: Chris McNab

16 December 2020	Coldstream	**0–2**	**Bo'ness United**	Coldstream
19:45			Locke 44'; Stevenson 81'	Stadium: Home Park; Referee: Jonathan Gall

21 December 2020	**Wick Academy**	**3–1** (a.e.t.)	Musselburgh Athletic	Wick
19:30	Gunn 14', 102'; MacAdie 117'		King 87'	Stadium: Harmsworth Park; Referee: Lee Robertson

21 December 2020	**Formartine United**	**2–1**	Turriff United	Keith
19:45	Smith 15'; McKeown 28'		Ward 51'	Stadium: Kynoch Park; Referee: Dan McFarlane

== First round ==
The first round took place on the weekend of 26 December 2020. Along with the 26 winners from the second preliminary round, there were 14 new entries at this stage - two from the Highland Football League (Brora Rangers and Fraserburgh), two from the Lowland Football League (Kelty Hearts and Bonnyrigg Rose Athletic) and all 10 teams from League Two.

=== Draw ===
The draw for the first round took place on Sunday 13 December 2020 at 10am live on the Scottish Cup YouTube, Facebook and Twitter accounts.

Teams in Italics were unknown at the time of the draw. Teams in bold advanced to the second round.

League Two	Highland League	Lowland League	East of Scotland League	SJFA North Region
Albion Rovers; **Annan Athletic**; Brechin City; **Cowdenbeath**; **Edinburgh City**; **Elgin City**; **Queen's Park**; **Stenhousemuir**; **Stirling Albion**; **Stranraer**	**Brora Rangers**; **Buckie Thistle**; **Formartine United**; **Fraserburgh**; **Huntly**; **Keith**; **Nairn County**; Rothes; Wick Academy	Berwick Rangers; Bo'ness United; **Bonnyrigg Rose Athletic**; Caledonian Braves; Civil Service Strollers; Cumbernauld Colts; East Stirlingshire; Gala Fairydean Rovers; **Kelty Hearts**; The Spartans	Broxburn Athletic; Camelon Juniors; Dundonald Bluebell; Haddington Athletic; Hill of Beath Hawthorn; Jeanfield Swifts; **Linlithgow Rose**; Lothian Thistle Hutchison Vale; Preston Athletic; **Tranent Juniors**	**Banks O'Dee**

=== Matches ===
26 December 2020	Haddington Athletic	**1–2**	**Formartine United**	Haddington
15:00	O'Neill 88'		S. Smith 49'; Lisle 90'	Stadium: Millfield Park; Referee: Daniel Graves

26 December 2020	**Keith**	**4–2** (a.e.t.)	Hill of Beath Hawthorn	Keith
15:00	Keith 13'; Gray 73'; MacAskill 96'; Selfridge 99'		Luke 18'; Connelly 37'	Stadium: Kynoch Park; Referee: Duncan Nicolson

26 December 2020	**Kelty Hearts**	**2–1**	Jeanfield Swifts	Kelty
15:00	Shanley 30'; Easton 58'		McLeish 70'	Stadium: New Central Park; Referee: Iain Snedden

26 December 2020	**Elgin City**	**4–0**	Civil Service Strollers	Elgin
15:00	Hester 35', 46', 70'; Dingwall 52'			Stadium: Borough Briggs; Referee: Dan McFarlane

26 December 2020	Gala Fairydean Rovers	**1–2**	**Annan Athletic**	Galashiels
15:00	Rodger 47'		Smith 19'; Lowdon 85'	Stadium: Netherdale; Referee: Stewart Luke

26 December 2020	Albion Rovers	**0–3**	**Buckie Thistle**	Coatbridge
15:00			MacAskill 22', 71'; Glover 44' (o.g.)	Stadium: Cliftonhill; Referee: Lorraine Watson

26 December 2020	Lothian Thistle Hutchison Vale	**0–3**	**Banks O' Dee**	Livingston
15:00			Buglass 68'; Armstrong 87'; Beattie 89'	Stadium: Almondvale Stadium; Referee: Alex Shepherd

26 December 2020	**Edinburgh City**	**3–1**	Caledonian Braves	Edinburgh
15:00	Reid 20' (o.g.); McIntyre 51'; Campbell 68'		McNeil 3'	Stadium: Ainslie Park; Referee: Barry Cook

26 December 2020	Brechin City	**2–3**	**Linlithgow Rose**	Brechin
15:00	Currie 15'; Inglis 52'		Coyne 37'; MacLennan 70'; Stevenson 72'	Stadium: Glebe Park; Referee: David Dickinson

26 December 2020	**Stenhousemuir**	**4–1**	Preston Athletic	Stenhousemuir
15:00	McGuigan 16', 80'; Tiffoney 28'; Hodge 88'		Edmond 47'	Stadium: Ochilview; Referee: Kevin Graham

26 December 2020	**Nairn County**	**0–0** (a.e.t.) (**4–3** p)	Broxburn Athletic	Nairn
15:00				Stadium: Station Park; Referee: Lee Robertson

26 December 2020	**Cowdenbeath**	**2–0**	Wick Academy	Cowdenbeath
15:00	Barr 37'; Renton 49'			Stadium: Central Park; Referee: Craig Napier

26 December 2020	Berwick Rangers	**0–3**	**Stirling Albion**	Berwick-upon-Tweed, England
15:00			K. Roberts 17'; Byrne 22'; Ryan 51'	Stadium: Shielfield Park; Referee: Mike Roncone

26 December 2020	**Tranent Juniors**	**4–1**	East Stirlingshire	Tranent
15:00	Watson 4'; Paterson 17'; Miller 29'; Hawkins 45'		Dishington 63'	Stadium: Foresters Park; Referee: Alastair Grieve

26 December 2020	Rothes	**1–3**	**Fraserburgh**	Rothes
15:00	Cormack 23'		Harris 33'; Barbour 36', 68'	Stadium: Mackessack Park; Referee: Harry Bruce

26 December 2020	Camelon Juniors	**0–0** **(Abandoned)**	Brora Rangers	Camelon
15:00				Stadium: Carmuirs Park; Referee: George Calder

26 December 2020	**Stranraer**	**5–0**	The Spartans	Stranraer
15:00	Duffy 9'; Paton 28'; Cummins 35'; Yates 66', 87'			Stadium: Stair Park; Referee: Lloyd Wilson

28 December 2020	Dundonald Bluebell	**1–3** (a.e.t.)	**Queen's Park**	Kelty
19:45	Wedderburn 90'		Quitongo 48'; Murray 100'; Longridge 109'	Stadium: New Central Park; Referee: Scott Lambie

1 January 2021	**Bonnyrigg Rose Athletic**	**5–2**	Bo'ness United	Bonnyrigg
15:00	Hunter 47', 74'; Currie 55' (pen.), 59' (pen.), 63' (pen.)		Miller 35'; Stevenson 87'	Stadium: New Dundas Park; Referee: Ross Menzies

6 January 2021	**Huntly**	**3–1**	Cumbernauld Colts	Aberdeen
20:00	Murison 30'; McKeown 54'; Elphinstone 89'		Team 3'	Stadium: Balmoral Stadium; Referee: Filippo Mazzoni

=== Replay ===
11 January 2021	Camelon Juniors	**1–2**	**Brora Rangers**	Denny
19:30	Morrison 20'		MacRae 65'; Nicolson 74'	Stadium: Westfield Park; Referee: George Calder

== Second round ==
The second round was scheduled to take place on the weekend of 9 January 2021, however a number of matches were postponed following freezing temperatures. Along with the 20 winners from the first round, there were 20 new entries at this stage - all 10 teams from League One and the Championship.

=== Draw ===
The draw for the second round took place on Monday 28 December 2020 at 7:15pm live on the Scottish Cup YouTube, Facebook and Twitter accounts. Teams in Italics were unknown at the time of the draw. Teams in bold advanced to the third round.

Championship	League One	League Two	Other
Alloa Athletic; Arbroath; **Ayr United**; **Dundee**; Dunfermline Athletic; **Greenock Morton**; Heart of Midlothian; **Inverness Caledonian Thistle**; **Queen of the South**; **Raith Rovers**	Airdrieonians; **Clyde**; **Cove Rangers**; **Dumbarton**; **East Fife**; **Falkirk**; **Forfar Athletic**; **Montrose**; **Partick Thistle**; Peterhead	Annan Athletic; Cowdenbeath; **Edinburgh City**; Elgin City; Queen's Park; **Stenhousemuir**; Stirling Albion; **Stranraer**	Highland League: **Brora Rangers**; Buckie Thistle; **Formartine United**; **Fraserburgh**; Huntly; Keith; Nairn County; Lowland League: Bonnyrigg Rose Athletic; Kelty Hearts; East of Scotland League: Linlithgow Rose; Tranent Juniors; SJFA North Region: Banks O'Dee

=== Matches ===
8 January 2021	Queen's Park	**0–3**	**Queen of the South**	Glasgow
19:45			Gibson 45+1'; Fitzpatrick 66'; Shields 82'	Stadium: Hampden Park; Referee: Euan Anderson

9 January 2021	**Forfar Athletic**	**4–1** (a.e.t.)	Linlithgow Rose	Forfar
15:00	MacKintosh 14'; Fotheringham 95', 101'; Allan 103'		Wilson 11'	Stadium: Station Park; Referee: Kevin Graham

9 January 2021	**East Fife**	**5–1**	Tranent Juniors	Methil
15:00	Agnew 40' (pen.), 55', 58'; Watson 45'; Smith 62'		Thomson 4'	Stadium: Bayview Stadium; Referee: Barry Cook

9 January 2021	Alloa Athletic	**2–3**	**Cove Rangers**	Alloa
15:00	Trouten 28' (pen.); O'Donnell 39'		Masson 38'; McAllister 76'; Strachan 90'	Stadium: Recreation Park; Referee: David Dickinson

9 January 2021	**Fraserburgh**	**2–1**	Banks O'Dee	Fraserburgh
15:00	Barbour 71'; Beagrie 80'		Philipson 54'	Stadium: Bellslea Park; Referee: Chris Graham

9 January 2021	Kelty Hearts	**2–3**	**Stranraer**	Kirkcaldy
18:00	Austin 25'; Higginbotham 37' (pen.)		Orr 48'; Robertson 63'; Paton 90+4' (pen.)	Stadium: Stark's Park; Referee: Lorraine Watson

9 January 2021	**Dundee**	**3–2** (a.e.t.)	Bonnyrigg Rose Athletic	Dundee
19:45	Afolabi 90'; Ashcroft 107'; Sow 112'		Currie 25' (pen.), 105' (pen.)	Stadium: Dens Park; Referee: Gavin Duncan

10 January 2021	Airdrieonians	**0–1**	**Edinburgh City**	Airdrie
13:00			See 65'	Stadium: Excelsior Stadium; Referee: David Lowe

=== Postponed ties ===
On 11 January 2021, the Scottish FA announced that competitions below the Championship would be suspended as a result of the COVID-19 pandemic in Scotland. As a result, the remaining second round ties were postponed. The remaining matches took place on 23 March 2021.

23 March 2021	Nairn County	**1–7**	**Montrose**	Nairn
19:30	MacLennan 56'		Quinn 11', 25'; Johnston 15', 60', 80'; McLean 44'; Hawke 70'	Stadium: Station Park; Referee: Gavin Ross

23 March 2021	Keith	**0–2**	**Clyde**	Keith
19:45			Gooodwillie 21'; Rumsby 33'	Stadium: Kynoch Park; Referee: Steven Kirkland

23 March 2021	Arbroath	**1–2**	**Falkirk**	Arbroath
19:45	Mutch 8' (o.g.)		Telfer 42'; Fotheringham 87'	Stadium: Gayfield Park; Referee: David Munro

23 March 2021	Elgin City	**0–4**	**Ayr United**	Elgin
19:45			Chalmers 5'; Moffat 33'; McCowan 25', 43'	Stadium: Borough Briggs; Referee: Craig Napier

23 March 2021	**Formartine United**	**1–1** (a.e.t.) (**3–1** p)	Annan Athletic	Pitmedden
19:45	Wood 17'		Smith 9'	Stadium: North Lodge Park; Referee: Calum Scott

23 March 2021	**Greenock Morton**	**0–0** (a.e.t.) (**6–5** p)	Dunfermline Athletic	Greenock
19:45				Stadium: Cappielow; Referee: Don Robertson

23 March 2021	**Dumbarton**	**4–0**	Huntly	Dumbarton
19:45	Wilson 30', 69'; McGeever 40'; Forbes 75'			Stadium: Dumbarton Football Stadium; Referee: Matthew MacDermid

23 March 2021	Peterhead	**0–1**	**Stenhousemuir**	Peterhead
19:45			McGuigan 17'	Stadium: Balmoor Stadium; Referee: Mike Roncone

23 March 2021	Stirling Albion	**0–2**	**Raith Rovers**	Stirling
19:45			Ugwu 45'; Tait 70'	Stadium: Forthbank Stadium; Referee: Alan Newlands

23 March 2021	**Partick Thistle**	**3–0**	Cowdenbeath	Glasgow
19:45	Gordon 7'; Rudden 52'; Murray 66'			Stadium: Firhill Stadium; Referee: Graham Grainger

23 March 2021	**Brora Rangers**	**2–1**	Heart of Midlothian	Brora
19:45	J MacRae 12'; Maclean 74'		Berra 70'	Stadium: Dudgeon Park; Referee: Peter Stuart

23 March 2021	Buckie Thistle	**2–3**	**Inverness Caledonian Thistle**	Buckie
20:00	J. Murray 16'; C. Murray 84'		Keatings 3'; Welsh 28'; D. Mackay 86'	Stadium: Victoria Park; Referee: Steven Reid

== Third round ==
The third round was originally scheduled to take place on the weekend of 30 January 2021 but instead took place in April 2021 as a result of the COVID-19 pandemic in Scotland. Along with the 20 winners from the second round, there were 12 new entries at this stage - all from the Premiership.

=== Draw ===
The draw for the third round took place on Sunday 10 January 2021 at 11am live on the Scottish Cup YouTube, Facebook and Twitter accounts.

Teams in Italics were unknown at the time of the draw. Teams in bold advanced to the fourth round.

Premiership	Championship	League One	League Two	Other
**Aberdeen**; **Celtic**; **Dundee United**; Hamilton Academical; **Hibernian**; **Kilmarnock**; **Livingston**; **Motherwell**; **Rangers**; Ross County; **St Johnstone**; **St Mirren**	Ayr United; Dundee; **Greenock Morton**; **Inverness Caledonian Thistle**; Queen of the South; Raith Rovers	**Clyde**; Cove Rangers; Dumbarton; East Fife; Falkirk; **Forfar Athletic**; **Montrose**; Partick Thistle	Edinburgh City; Stenhousemuir; **Stranraer**	Highland League: Brora Rangers; Formartine United; Fraserburgh

=== Matches ===
2 April 2021	Ross County	**1–3**	**Inverness Caledonian Thistle**	Dingwall
19:45	B. Mckay 38'		Todorov 40'; D. MacKay 54'; Sutherland 87'	Stadium: Victoria Park; Referee: Nick Walsh

3 April 2021	Dumbarton	**0–1**	**Aberdeen**	Dumbarton
12:15			Hendry 84'	Stadium: Dumbarton Football Stadium; Referee: Don Robertson

3 April 2021	**Forfar Athletic**	**2–2** (a.e.t.) (**5–3** p)	Edinburgh City	Forfar
15:00	Allan 13'; Nditi 90'		See 6'; Hamilton 25'	Stadium: Station Park; Referee: Steven Kirkland
	**Penalties**
	Meechan (penalty scored); Doris (penalty scored); Shepherd (penalty scored); Fenwick (penalty scored); Scally (penalty scored)		(penalty scored) L. Henderson; (penalty scored) Brown; (penalty scored) Laird; (penalty missed) Thomson

3 April 2021	**Dundee United**	**2–1**	Partick Thistle	Dundee
15:00	Shankland 78'; Clark 90'		Tiffoney 25'	Stadium: Tannadice Park; Referee: Steven McLean

3 April 2021	**Livingston**	**2–1** (a.e.t.)	Raith Rovers	Livingston
15:00	Fitzwater 70'; Poplatnik 109'		Vaughan 13'	Stadium: Almondvale Stadium; Referee: Bobby Madden

3 April 2021	Brora Rangers	**1–3** (a.e.t.)	**Stranraer**	Brora
15:00	Gillespie 26' (pen.)		Sonkur 88'; Yates 100'; Orr 107'	Stadium: Dudgeon Park; Referee: Scott Lambie

3 April 2021	Stenhousemuir	**0–4**	**Kilmarnock**	Stenhousemuir
15:00			Lafferty 38' (pen.), 45', 56'; Oakley 87'	Stadium: Ochilview Park; Referee: Greg Aitken

3 April 2021	East Fife	**1–2** (a.e.t.)	**Greenock Morton**	Methil
15:00	Smith 59'		McGinty 90' (pen.); Muirhead 112'	Stadium: Bayview Stadium; Referee: Alan Muir

3 April 2021	Hamilton Academical	**0–3**	**St Mirren**	Hamilton
15:00			McGrath 4', 79' (pen.); Dennis 74'	Stadium: New Douglas Park; Referee: Euan Anderson

3 April 2021	Dundee	**0–1**	**St Johnstone**	Dundee
15:00			Melamed 20'	Stadium: Dens Park; Referee: Craig Napier

3 April 2021	Ayr United	**0–1**	**Clyde**	Ayr
15:00			Cuddihy 4'	Stadium: Somerset Park; Referee: David Munro

3 April 2021	Formartine United	**0–5**	**Motherwell**	Pitmedden
15:00			Long 34'; Roberts 41', 52'; Cole 63'; Campbell 76'	Stadium: North Lodge Park; Referee: Mike Roncone

3 April 2021	Fraserburgh	**2–4**	**Montrose**	Fraserburgh
15:00	Harris 19' (pen.); Barbour 22'		Mochrie 2'; Webster 31'; McLean 69'; Milne 90'	Stadium: Bellslea Park; Referee: Grant Irvine

3 April 2021	**Celtic**	**3–0**	Falkirk	Glasgow
19:30	Forrest 56'; Christie 58'; Elyounoussi 79'			Stadium: Celtic Park; Referee: John Beaton

4 April 2021	**Rangers**	**4–0**	Cove Rangers	Glasgow
18:30	Defoe 24'; Roofe 31', 32'; Patterson 43'			Stadium: Ibrox Stadium; Referee: Kevin Clancy

5 April 2021	Queen of the South	**1–3**	**Hibernian**	Dumfries
19:45	Maxwell 80'		Doidge 42', 67'; Boyle 70'	Stadium: Palmerston Park; Referee: Willie Collum

== Fourth round ==
The fourth round took place on the weekend of 17 April 2021.

=== Draw ===
The draw for the fourth round took place on Sunday 4 April 2021 at 2pm live on the Scottish Cup YouTube, Facebook and Twitter accounts.

Teams in Italics were unknown at the time of the draw. Teams in Bold advanced to the quarter-finals.

Premiership	Championship	League One	League Two
**Aberdeen**; Celtic; **Dundee United**; **Hibernian**; **Kilmarnock**; Livingston; **Motherwell**; **Rangers**; **St Johnstone**; **St Mirren**	Greenock Morton; Inverness Caledonian Thistle	Clyde; Forfar Athletic; Montrose	Stranraer

=== Matches ===
Following the death of Prince Philip, Duke of Edinburgh, the fourth round matches were rearranged to avoid clashing with his funeral on 17 April 2021.

16 April 2021	**St Mirren**	**2–1**	Inverness Caledonian Thistle	Paisley
18:00	Dennis 50'; Fraser 89'		Todorov 48'	Stadium: St Mirren Park; Referee: John Beaton

16 April 2021	**Motherwell**	**1–1** (a.e.t.) (**5–3** p)	Greenock Morton	Motherwell
19:00	O'Donnell 120+1'		Fjørtoft 120+3'	Stadium: Fir Park; Referee: Willie Collum
	**Penalties**
	O'Hara (penalty scored); Cole (penalty scored); Long (penalty scored); Hastie (penalty scored); O'Donnell (penalty scored)		Orsi (penalty scored); Jacobs (penalty scored); McGinty (penalty missed); McLean (penalty scored)

16 April 2021	Forfar Athletic	**0–1**	**Dundee United**	Forfar
19:45			Pawlett 56'	Stadium: Station Park; Referee: Don Robertson

17 April 2021	**Kilmarnock**	**3–1**	Montrose	Kilmarnock
11:45	Lafferty 6'; Pinnock 24'; Kiltie 61'		Ballantyne 82'	Stadium: Rugby Park; Referee: Nick Walsh

17 April 2021	**Aberdeen**	**2–2** (a.e.t.) (**5–3** p)	Livingston	Aberdeen
17:30	McGinn 77'; Kamberi 95'		Emmanuel-Thomas 37', 93' (pen.)	Stadium: Pittodrie Stadium; Referee: Colin Steven
	**Penalties**
	Ferguson (penalty scored); Kamberi (penalty scored); Hendry (penalty scored); Campbell (penalty scored); McCrorie (penalty scored)		Lithgow (penalty scored); Holt (penalty missed); Emmanuel-Thomas (penalty scored); Taylor-Sinclair (penalty scored)

17 April 2021	**St Johnstone**	**2–0**	Clyde	Perth
17:30	Melamed 6'; O'Halloran 21'			Stadium: McDiarmid Park; Referee: Steven Kirkland

18 April 2021	Stranraer	**0–4**	**Hibernian**	Stranraer
12:15			Doidge 37'; Nisbet 64'; Boyle 71', 84' (pen.)	Stadium: Stair Park; Referee: David Munro

18 April 2021	**Rangers**	**2–0**	Celtic	Glasgow
15:00	Davis 10'; Kenny 34' (o.g.)			Stadium: Ibrox Stadium; Referee: Bobby Madden

== Quarter-finals ==
The quarter-finals took place on the weekend of 24 April 2021.

=== Draw ===
The draw for the quarter-finals took place on Sunday 4 April 2021 at 2pm live on the Scottish Cup YouTube, Facebook and Twitter accounts.

=== Matches ===
24 April 2021	Hibernian	2–2 (a.e.t.) (4–2 p)	Motherwell	Edinburgh
17:00	Doidge 52'; Irvine 80'		Lamie 82'; Watt 88'	Stadium: Easter Road; Referee: John Beaton
	Penalties
	Boyle (penalty scored); Hallberg (penalty scored); McGinn (penalty scored); Nisbet (penalty missed); Porteous (penalty scored)		Cole (penalty scored); O'Hara (penalty missed); Lawless (penalty missed); Long (penalty scored)

25 April 2021	Aberdeen	0–3	Dundee United	Aberdeen
14:30			McNulty 18', 54'; Edwards 37'	Stadium: Pittodrie Stadium; Referee: Kevin Clancy

25 April 2021	Rangers	1–1 (a.e.t.) (2–4 p)	St Johnstone	Glasgow
18:30	Tavernier 116'		Kane 120+2'	Stadium: Ibrox Stadium; Referee: Alan Muir
	Penalties
	Tavernier (penalty missed); Barišić (penalty scored); Defoe (penalty scored); Roofe (penalty missed)		Craig (penalty scored); Booth (penalty scored); Kerr (penalty scored); McCann (penalty scored)

26 April 2021	Kilmarnock	3–3 (a.e.t.) (4–5 p)	St Mirren	Kilmarnock
19:45	Rossi 37'; Kiltie 44'; Millen 101' (pen.)		Durmuş 25'; Shaughnessy 84'; McGrath 119' (pen.)	Stadium: Rugby Park; Referee: Don Robertson
	Penalties
	Dicker (penalty scored); McKenzie (penalty missed); Pinnock (penalty scored); Millen (penalty scored); Tshibola (penalty scored)		McGrath (penalty scored); MacPherson (penalty scored); Quaner (penalty scored); Shaughnessy (penalty scored); McAllister (penalty scored)

== Semi-finals ==
The semi-finals took place at Hampden Park on the weekend of 8 May 2021.

=== Draw ===
The draw for the semi-finals took place on Monday 26 April 2021 live on BBC Scotland following the Kilmarnock v St Mirren tie. Teams in Bold advanced to the final.

- Dundee United
- **Hibernian**
- **St Johnstone**
- St Mirren

=== Matches ===
8 May 2021	Dundee United	**0–2**	**Hibernian**	Glasgow
16:00			Nisbet 27'; Doidge 58'	Stadium: Hampden Park; Referee: Bobby Madden

9 May 2021	St Mirren	**1–2**	**St Johnstone**	Glasgow
14:15	McCarthy 86'		Kane 72'; Middleton 74'	Stadium: Hampden Park; Referee: Willie Collum

== Final ==
The final was played on 22 May 2021 at Hampden Park in Glasgow. Originally it was scheduled for 8 May 2021 but was pushed back due to the coronavirus pandemic.

22 May 2021
14:00

St Johnstone	1–0	Hibernian
Rooney 32'	Report

Hampden Park, Glasgow
Referee: Nick Walsh

== Broadcasting ==
The Scottish Cup was broadcast by Premier Sports and BBC Scotland. Premier Sports had the first 2 picks of Round 3 and Round 4, the quarter-finals as well as first pick of one semi-final and aired the final non-exclusively. BBC Scotland broadcast one match per round from the first round and two matches per round from the second round to the quarter-finals, as well as one semi-final and the final.

The following matches were broadcast live on UK television:

Round	BBC Scotland	Premier Sports
First round	Dundonald Bluebell vs Queen's Park	
Second round	Queen's Park vs Queen of the South; Dundee vs Bonnyrigg Rose Athletic	
Third round	Ross County vs Inverness Caledonian Thistle; Dumbarton vs Aberdeen; Queen of the South vs Hibernian	Celtic vs Falkirk; Rangers vs Cove Rangers
Fourth round	Forfar Athletic vs Dundee United; Stranraer vs Hibernian	Rangers vs Celtic; Aberdeen vs Livingston
Quarter-finals	Aberdeen vs Dundee United; Kilmarnock vs St Mirren	Hibernian vs Motherwell; Rangers vs St Johnstone
Semi-finals	St Mirren vs St Johnstone	Dundee United vs Hibernian; St Mirren vs St Johnstone
Final	St Johnstone vs Hibernian	
