= East Region Premiership =

- Founded: 2002 (24 years ago)
- Folded: 2021
- Country: Scotland
- Region: SJFA East Region
- Divisions: 2
- Number of clubs: 30
- Level on pyramid: 1
- Domestic cup: Scottish Junior Cup
- Last champions: Lochee United (3rd title) (2019–20)
- Most championships: Bonnyrigg Rose Athletic (four titles)

The Scottish Junior Football Association East Region Premiership, also known for sponsorship reasons as the McBookie.com East Premiership, was the highest division of the East Region of the Scottish Junior Football Association. From its inception in 2002 until 2020, it was known as the SJFA East Region Super League.

From the 2007–08 season, the winners of the league were eligible to enter the senior Scottish Cup at its earliest stage, with Linlithgow Rose being the first champions to take part in the Scottish Cup.

In 2013–14 the East Super League expanded from its original twelve clubs to sixteen as part of a wider league restructuring in the East Region. For the 2018–19 season, league reconstruction reduced the Super League back to twelve teams after 24 Junior clubs from the east region moved to the East of Scotland Football League. Further changes were made to create two regional divisions in the 2019–20 season (declared void prior to completion).

From the 2006–07 season until the 2017–18 season, the Super League relegated into the Premier League, which in turn fed down into the North and South divisions. The mass resignations from 2018 also led to reorganisations in the structure below the top tier.

From the 2021–22 season, the SJFA East Region along with North Caledonian Football Association and the SJFA North Region were incorporated into the Scottish football league system to form a fully-integrated Tier 6 below the Highland League. With all south (Lothian) clubs having already left the SJFA league to join the East of Scotland League (while retaining their membership), it was decided the new single division formed by the remaining north (Tayside) clubs would be named the Midlands Football League, although it would still be administered by the SJFA.

== Champions and season summaries ==
Season	Winners	Runners-up	Relegated	Promoted	Champions' Progression in Scottish Cup
2002–03	Tayport	Hill of Beath Hawthorn	Carnoustie Panmure; Edinburgh United; Dundee Violet	Lochee United; Bo'ness United; Kelty Hearts	N/A
2003–04	Linlithgow Rose	Tayport	Kelty Hearts; Hill of Beath Hawthorn; Dundee North End	Carnoustie Panmure; Camelon Juniors; Thornton Hibs	N/A
2004–05	Lochee United	Tayport	Oakley United; Camelon Juniors; Thornton Hibs	Hill of Beath Hawthorn; Whitburn Juniors; Dundee North End	N/A
2005–06	Tayport (2)	Bathgate Thistle	Glenrothes; Arniston Rangers; Dundee North End	Oakley United; Camelon Juniors; Kinnoull	N/A
2006–07	Linlithgow Rose (2)	Bonnyrigg Rose Athletic	Bo'ness United; Kinnoull	Glenrothes; Kelty Hearts	4th Round 2007–08
2007–08	Lochee United (2)	Whitburn Juniors	Carnoustie Panmure; Oakley United	Bo'ness United; Forfar West End	3rd Round 2008–09
2008–09	Bonnyrigg Rose Athletic	Camelon Juniors	Forfar West End; Tayport	Musselburgh Athletic; Newtongrange Star	1st Round 2009–10
2009–10	Bo'ness United	Linlithgow Rose	Whitburn Juniors; Glenrothes	Tayport; Forfar West End	3rd Round 2010–11
2010–11	Bo'ness United (2)	Hill of Beath Hawthorn	Tayport; Newtongrange Star	St Andrews United; Carnoustie Panmure	3rd Round 2011–12
2011–12	Bonnyrigg Rose Athletic (2)	Hill of Beath Hawthorn	Bathgate Thistle; Forfar West End (in abeyance)	Sauchie Juniors; Broxburn Athletic	3rd Round 2012–13
2012–13	Linlithgow Rose (3)	Bonnyrigg Rose Athletic	No relegation. League expanded to 16 clubs	Newtongrange Star; Ballingry Rovers; Tayport; Armadale Thistle	2nd Round 2013–14
2013–14	Bo'ness United (3)	Linlithgow Rose	Tayport; St Andrews United	Penicuik Athletic; Fauldhouse United	4th Round 2014–15
2014–15	Kelty Hearts	Bo'ness United	Armadale Thistle; Lochee United; Ballingry Rovers (folded)	Tayport; St Andrews United; Broughty Athletic	1st Round 2015–16
2015–16	Bonnyrigg Rose Athletic (3)	Kelty Hearts	Sauchie Juniors; St Andrews United; Tayport	Jeanfield Swifts; Dundonald Bluebell; Lochee United	4th Round 2016–17
2016–17	Kelty Hearts (2)	Bonnyrigg Rose Athletic	Musselburgh Athletic; Fauldhouse United	Sauchie Juniors; Kennoway Star Hearts; Forfar West End	Preliminary round 1 2017–18
2017–18	Bonnyrigg Rose Athletic (4)	Linlithgow Rose	No relegation. League reduced to 12 clubs	Fauldhouse United; Tayport; Thornton Hibs; Glenrothes; Downfield; Whitburn Juniors; Kirriemuir Thistle	1st Round 2018–19
2018–19	Lochee United (3)	Broughty Athletic	No relegation or promotion, league restructured post-season into North and South sections		2nd Round 2019–20
2019–20	Split into North and South divisions. Season suspended in March 2020 due to the COVID-19 pandemic, later declared null and void with no champion declared. (Note: Using a 'points per game' algorithm applied in other leagues, Carnoustie Panmure (who were also leading the league when play stopped) would have been nominal champions of the North section, while Pumpherston and Thornton Hibs would have finished on equal points in the South section.)				
2020–21	Renamed East Premiership and featured all East Region clubs. Split into North and South divisions. Season began in November 2020 and was suspended in January 2021 due to the COVID-19 pandemic, later declared null and void with no champion declared.				
