= Bryan Purdie =

Scottish Footballer

Personal information
- Date of birth: 1 January 1959 (age 67)
- Place of birth: Bo'ness, Scotland
- Position: Midfielder

Senior career*
Years	Team	Apps	(Gls)
1976–1977	Berwick Rangers	1	(0)
1977–1980	Cowdenbeath	89	(11)
1980–1984	Alloa	119	(14)
1984–1986	Falkirk	88	(2)
1986–1988	Raith Rovers	19	(1)
1987–1989	Partick Thistle	23	(1)
1988–1990	East Stirling	33	(0)
- Bo'ness United
- * Club domestic league appearances and goals

Bryan Purdie (born 1 January 1959) is a Scottish former professional footballer who played as a midfielder for Partick Thistle, Falkirk and Alloa.

== Playing career ==
Purdie made one appearance for Berwick Rangers in the 1976–1977 season.

In 1977, he signed for Cowdenbeath and went on to make 89 league appearances for the club over three seasons.

Alloa was the next destination for Purdie, and the club he would make the most league appearances for during his career. He made 119 appearances and scored 14 goals between 1980 and 1984.

He signed for Falkirk in 1984. He made 88 appearances for the Bairns and scored 2 goals.

Purdie spent the next two seasons with Raith Rovers after signing for them in 1986, but he only managed 19 league appearances before departing Starks Park in 1988.

In 1987, he signed for Partick Thistle. He scored 1 goals in 23 league appearances for the Jags, before leaving the club in 1989.

He signed for East Stirling in 1988. He made 33 league appearances over the next two seasons before being released.

== Coaching career ==
Purdie later joined the coaching staff at Bo'ness United, whilst also being registered as a player. He left the club in 1995, claiming he had lost enthusiasm for football.
