= Max Murray =

Scottish footballer (1935–2016)

Personal information
- Full name: Maxwell Murray
- Date of birth: 7 November 1935
- Place of birth: Falkirk, Scotland
- Date of death: 5 September 2016 (aged 80)
- Place of death: Falkirk, Scotland
- Position: Striker

Senior career*
Years	Team	Apps	(Gls)
1952–1953	Camelon		
1953–1955	Queen's Park	49	(24)
1955–1962	Rangers	103	(80)
1962–1963	West Bromwich Albion	3	(0)
1963–1965	Third Lanark	61	(17)
1965–1966	Clyde	6	(2)
1966–1968	Distillery		

International career
1953–1955	Scotland Amateurs	5	(5)
1956–1957	Scotland U23	2	(0)
- * Club domestic league appearances and goals

Max Murray (7 November 1935 – 5 September 2016) was a Scottish footballer.

== Career ==
Murray began his career at Queen's Park, before moving to Ibrox in 1955. His scoring debut came on 13 August 1955 in a Scottish League Cup match against Falkirk which the club won 5–0. He had a very successful spell at Rangers, winning two Scottish league championships and finishing top scorer three times in a row. He amassed 121 goals in just 154 games and on 24 October 1956 he scored Rangers' first ever goal in European competition, an equaliser in a European Cup first round match against OGC Nice at Ibrox, a match Rangers won 2–1.

He left Rangers in 1962 for West Bromwich Albion, but he only lasted a season in English football before he moved back to Scotland.

On 5 September 2016, Rangers announced that Murray had died aged 80.
