= Jonny Stewart =

Scottish footballer

Personal information
- Date of birth: 12 February 1990 (age 36)
- Place of birth: Scotland
- Position: Midfielder

Team information
- Current team: Bonnyrigg Rose (manager)

Youth career
- Heart of Midlothian

Senior career*
| Years | Team | Apps | (Gls) |
| 2009–2012 | Heart of Midlothian | 2 | (0) |
| 2010–2011 | → Dundee (loan) | 10 | (0) |
| 2012 | → Raith Rovers (loan) | 4 | (0) |
| 2012–2013 | Brechin City | 31 | (0) |
| 2013–2014 | East Fife | 26 | (0) |
| 2014–2024 | Bonnyrigg Rose Athletic | 80 | (1) |
| 2024–2025 | Tranent | | |

Managerial career
- 2024–2025: Tranent
- 2025–: Bonnyrigg Rose
- * Club domestic league appearances and goals as of 20:00, 13 March 2025 (UTC)

Jonathan Stewart (born 12 February 1990) is a Scottish professional footballer who is currently manager of Lowland League club Bonnyrigg Rose.

He has previously played in the Scottish Premier League for Heart of Midlothian and in the Scottish Professional Football League for several clubs.

== Career ==
=== Hearts ===
Stewart graduated from the Hearts youth academy, captaining their under-19 team. He signed his first professional contract with the club in 2006. He made his professional for Hearts on 24 May 2009, in the 0–0 away draw with Celtic replacing Marius Žaliūkas as a substitute in the 80th minute.

He made one more appearance the following season on 26 September 2009 as a 90th-minute substitute against Hamilton Academical, before being sent on loan to Dundee. On his return he was an unused substitute on several occasions and in March 2012 he was sent out on loan again to Raith Rovers.

=== Dundee (loan) ===
In October 2010, Stewart played a trial match for Greenock Morton with a view to signing on loan. However, he went on to join Dundee on loan. He made his debut on 14 December 2010 as a substitute against Cowdenbeath. In all he made 11 appearances before returning to Hearts in March.

=== Raith Rovers (loan) ===
On 2 March 2012, Stewart joined Scottish First Division side Raith Rovers on loan until the end of the season.

=== After Hearts ===
Stewart signed for Brechin City after his release from Hearts in the summer of 2012 then moved to East Fife the following season. He joined Junior side Bonnyrigg Rose Athletic in the summer of 2014. Stewart moved to Tranent in 2024 and was announced as player/manager on 3 September.
