= Billy Neil (footballer, born 1944) =

Scottish footballer

Personal information
- Full name: William Waugh Neil
- Date of birth: 10 November 1944 (age 81)
- Place of birth: Roslin, Scotland
- Position: Left winger

Senior career*
Years	Team	Apps	(Gls)
–1964	Bonnyrigg Rose Athletic		
1964–1972	Millwall	187	(23)
- * Club domestic league appearances and goals

William Waugh Neil (born 10 November 1944) is a Scottish retired professional footballer who made over 180 appearances in the Football League for Millwall as a left winger.

== Playing career ==
After retiring as a player, Neil settled in Lewisham. As of November 2014, He had been on the club's staff for 50 years, firstly as a player, then a youth coach and then in the commercial department. He is a member of the Millwall Hall of Fame and a lounge at The Den is named for him.

== Career statistics ==
Appearances and goals by club, season and competition
Club	Season	League			FA Cup		League Cup		Total	
Club	Season	Division	Apps	Goals	Apps	Goals	Apps	Goals	Apps	Goals
Millwall	1964–65	Fourth Division	22	3	2	0	3	0	27	3
Millwall	1965–66	Third Division	34	6	0	0	3	3	37	9
Millwall	1966–67	Second Division	36	7	2	0	2	0	40	7
Millwall	1967–68	Second Division	36	6	1	0	4	1	41	7
Millwall	1968–69	Second Division	32	0	3	0	1	0	36	3
Millwall	1969–70	Second Division	20	0	0	0	2	0	22	0
Millwall	1970–71	Second Division	6	1	0	0	0	0	6	1
Millwall	1971–72	Second Division	1	0	0	0	0	0	1	0
Career total			187	23	8	0	15	4	210	27

== Honours ==
Millwall

- Football League Third Division second-place promotion: 1965–66
- Football League Fourth Division second-place promotion: 1964–65

Individual

- Millwall Hall of Fame
- Football League Unsung Hero: 2012–13
