= Robbie Raeside =

South African-born Scottish footballer

Personal information
- Date of birth: 7 July 1972 (age 54)
- Place of birth: Pietersburg, South Africa
- Position: Defender

Team information
- Current team: Hill of Beath Hawthorn (Manager)

Senior career*
Years	Team	Apps	(Gls)
1990–1996	Raith Rovers	55	(1)
1996–2000	Dundee	67	(5)
1999	→ Arbroath(loan)	6	(0)
2000	Arbroath	8	(1)
2000	Shelbourne	0	(0)
2000–2001	Greenock Morton	33	(1)
2001–2002	Alloa Athletic	23	(3)
2001	→ Stirling Albion (loan)	6	(0)
2002–2006	Peterhead	103	(11)
2006–2009	Arbroath	115	(15)
2009–	St Andrews United		

Managerial career
- 2022–2024: St Andrews United
- 2025–: Hill of Beath Hawthorn
- * Club domestic league appearances and goals

Robert Raeside (born 7 July 1972) is a Scottish former footballer who was the manager of St Andrews United until June 2024.

Raeside began his career with Raith Rovers, winning two Scottish First Division titles and the Scottish League Cup during his six years at Stark's Park. In 1996, Raeside moved to Dundee, where he won another First Division title in 1998. In 2000, Raeside joined Arbroath after a loan spell, then went on to play for a number of other clubs - Greenock Morton, Alloa Athletic, Stirling Albion and Peterhead - before returning to Arbroath in 2006.

Out of contract at Arbroath, Raeside accepted a month's loan at Shelbourne in July 2000. He played one game in the UEFA Champions League qualifier win in Macedonia against Sloga Jugomagnat, before returning to Scotland.

He became Manager of St Andrews United after retiring playing for the Saints in 2022 before leaving the club in 2024, year out of the game he became Manager at East of Scotland side Hill of Beath Hawthorn in 2025 and is currently with the Fife side since.

== Honours ==
=== Raith Rovers ===
- Scottish Football League First Division: 2

1992-93, 1994-95

- Scottish League Cup: 1

1994-95

=== Dundee ===
- Scottish Football League First Division: 1

1997-98
