= Scottish Junior Football East Region Premier League =

- Founded: 2006
- Folded: 2018
- Country: Scotland
- Number of clubs: 16
- Level on pyramid: 2
- Promotion to: East Superleague
- Relegation to: East Region North Division or East Region South Division
- Domestic cup(s): Scottish Junior Cup
- Last champions: Musselburgh Athletic (2nd title) (2017-18)

The Scottish Junior Football East Region Premier League, was the second-highest division of the East Region of the Scottish Junior Football Association between 2006 and 2018.

== History ==
From the 2006–07 season the East Super League was the highest tier, with the Premier League feeding down into South, Central and North divisions, replacing (but largely based upon) the old East (Lothians), Fife and Tayside leagues respectively. To populate the Premier League for its first season, three teams were relegated from the Super League (Note: Glenrothes, Arniston Rangers and Dundee North End) and three were promoted from each of the districts (Note: Tayside: Montrose Roselea (2nd), Scone Thistle (3rd), Lochee Harp (4th); Fife: St Andrews United (2nd), Rosyth (3rd), Kelty Hearts (4th); Lothians: Penicuik Athletic (2nd), Musselburgh Athletic (3rd), Armadale Thistle (4th).) – teams finishing 2nd–4th, with the winners jumping straight to the Super League. From the second season onwards, the bottom three teams were relegated (regardless of their originating location) with the three lower division winners replacing them. The Premier League winners and runners-up were promoted to the Super League, swapping with its bottom two teams. From 2013 to 2014, the Premier League was expanded to sixteen clubs and was fed by two expanded North and South divisions.

After the 2017–18 season, 24 clubs left the junior leagues to join the East of Scotland Football League, reducing the teams competing across the four leagues from 60 to 36. This led to the league to restructure from four to three leagues which consisted of two 12-team north and south sections feeding into a 12-team Super League; these were renamed the Premier League North and South but were essentially a continuation of the third tier divisions with the Premier removed from above them.

== Final Members ==
| Club | Location | Home Ground | Finishing position 2017–18 |
|---|---|---|---|
| Arniston Rangers | Gorebridge | Newbyres Park | 12th |
| Bathgate Thistle | Bathgate | Creamery Park | 13th |
| Blackburn United | Blackburn | New Murrayfield Park | 5th |
| Dalkeith Thistle | Dalkeith | King's Park | 14th |
| Downfield | Dundee | Downfield Park | 10th |
| Dunbar United | Dunbar | New Countess Park | 7th |
| Fauldhouse United | Fauldhouse | Park View | 2nd |
| Glenrothes | Glenrothes | Warout Stadium | 9th |
| Haddington Athletic | Haddington | Millfield Park | 3rd |
| Kirriemuir Thistle | Kirriemuir | Westview Park | 16th |
| Musselburgh Athletic | Musselburgh | Olivebank Stadium | 1st |
| St Andrews United | St Andrews | Recreation Park | 11th |
| Tayport | Tayport | Canniepairt | 4th |
| Thornton Hibernian | Thornton | Memorial Park | 6th |
| Tranent | Tranent | Foresters Park | 8th |
| Whitburn | Whitburn | Central Park | 15th |

== Winners ==
- 2006–07: Glenrothes
- 2007–08: Bo'ness United
- 2008–09: Musselburgh Athletic
- 2009–10: Tayport
- 2010–11: St. Andrews United
- 2011–12: Sauchie
- 2012–13: Newtongrange Star
- 2013–14: Penicuik Athletic
- 2014–15: Tayport
- 2015–16: Jeanfield Swifts
- 2016–17: Sauchie (2)
- 2017–18: Musselburgh Athletic (2)
