= Bo'ness United F.C. =

Association football club in Scotland

Bo'ness United
- Full name: Bo'ness United Football Club
- Nickname: The B.U.'s
- Founded: 1945; 81 years ago
- Ground: Newtown Park, Bo'ness
- Capacity: 2,500
- Coordinates: 56.009453°N 3.611572°W
- Manager: Stuart Hunter
- League: Lowland League East
- 2025–26: Lowland League, 9th of 18
- Website: https://www.bonessunitedfc.co.uk/
Home colours	Away colours

Bo'ness United Football Club is a Scottish football club, based in the town of Bo'ness. The team plays in the Lowland League East after winning the East of Scotland League and gaining SFA membership in 2020. They presently play their home games at Newtown Park, which holds 2,500 spectators and has been used as a football ground since the 1880s. They play in blue.

Bo'ness like many other clubs moved from the junior leagues in 2018. The club won the Scottish Junior Cup on three occasions, in 1948, 1976 and 1984, and lifted the 2018–19 East of Scotland League Cup defeating Musselburgh Athletic 1–0.

== History ==
Nicknamed the B.U.'s, Bo'ness United were formed in 1945, at the end of the Second World War when Bo'ness, a club that had played in the senior ranks, being a member of the Scottish Football League from 1921 to 1932, merged with the Junior club Bo'ness Cadora.

The club won the Scottish Junior Cup on three occasions, in 1948, 1976 and 1984.

As a result of winning the 2009–10 East Region Super League, United competed in the Scottish Cup for the first time the following season. The club eventually reached the third round, defeating Scottish Football League Third Division side Queen's Park at home in round two. They also reached the third round the following year.

United moved to the East of Scotland Football League in 2018, along with many other East Region junior clubs.

== Lowland League ==
The club were promoted to the Lowland League after winning the East of Scotland League and gaining SFA membership in 2020.

== Rivalries ==
Bo'ness United have a rivalry with Linlithgow Rose – the towns are about 3 miles (4.8 km) apart; they were among the successful and well-supported clubs from the days of the East Juniors and both moved to the EoSFL at the same point in 2018.

Bo'ness Athletic joined the Junior leagues in 2019 as an informal partner to Bo'ness United, but switched to the East of Scotland leagues as a separate club two years later, causing concerns over there being a new competitor (with similar names, badges and kit) within the same system and community.

== Current squad ==
As of 22 July 2026

Note: Flags indicate national team as defined under FIFA eligibility rules; some limited exceptions apply. Players may hold more than one non-FIFA nationality.

No.	Pos.	Nation	Player
—	GK	SCO	Allan Fleming
—	GK	SCO	Sam Gardner
—	GK	SCO	Scott Ritchie
—	DF	SCO	Adam Masson
—	DF	IRQ	Aldin El-Zubaidi
—	DF	SCO	Daniel Irving
—	DF	SCO	Keir Macauley
—	DF	SCO	Jordan Armstrong
—	DF	SCO	Joe Cassidy
—	DF	SCO	Lewis Duffy
—	DF	SCO	Shaun Rutherford
—	MF	SCO	Jack Hodge
—	MF	SCO	Jamie Allan

No.	Pos.	Nation	Player
—	MF	SCO	Tom Grant (Captain)
—	MF	SCO	Cameron Mulvanny
—	MF	SCO	Campbell Forrest
—	MF	SCO	Conor Scullion
—	MF	SCO	Reece Murdoch
—	MF	SCO	Roan Fitzpatrick
—	MF	SCO	Shaun Brown
—	MF	SCO	Alfie Smith
—	FW	SCO	Jackson Mylchreest
—	FW	SCO	Hamza Dibaga
—	FW	SCO	Kieran Mitchell
—	FW	SCO	Murray Binnie (on loan from Stranraer)
—	FW	SCO	Ryan Schiavone

=== Out on loan ===
Note: Flags indicate national team as defined under FIFA eligibility rules; some limited exceptions apply. Players may hold more than one non-FIFA nationality.

No. / Pos. / Nation / Player; — / MF / SCO / Taylor Penman (on loan at St Andrews United)	No. / Pos. / Nation / Player; — / MF / SCO / Tom Harrison (on loan at St Andrews United)

== Club Official ==
Date 29th June 2029

Role	Name
Manager	(Scotland) Stuart Hunter
Assistant manager	(Scotland) Michael Gemmell
First-team coach	(Scotland) Cameron Evans
Goalkeeping coach	(Scotland) Scott Ritchie
Physiotherapist	(Scotland) Jenna Orr

== Season-by-season record ==
=== Junior ===
This list is incomplete; you can help by adding missing items with reliable sources.

Season	Division	Tier	Pos.	Pld.	W	D	L	GD	Pts	Scottish Junior Cup
1945–46	Junior Edinburgh & District League	Junior 1	2nd	22	19	4	5	+30	30	Second round
1946–47	Junior Edinburgh & District League	Junior 1	1st	34	27	4	3	+96	58	Runners-up
1947–48	Junior Edinburgh & District League	Junior 1	1st	42	28	6	8	+77	62	Winners
1948–49	Junior Edinburgh & District League	Junior 1	1st	44	32	5	7	+73	69	Fourth round
1949–50	Junior Edinburgh & District West Division	Junior 1								Fifth round
1950–51	Junior Edinburgh & District West Division	Junior 1								
1951–52	Junior Edinburgh & District West Division	Junior 1								
1952–53	Junior Edinburgh & District West Division	Junior 1								
1953–54	Junior Edinburgh & District West Division	Junior 1	1st							
1953–54	Junior East Play-off	Junior 1	Runners-up							
1954–55	Junior Edinburgh & District West Division	Junior 1	1st							
1954–55	Junior East Play-off	Junior 1	Runners-up							
1955–56	Junior Edinburgh & District West Division	Junior 1								
1956–57	Junior Edinburgh & District West Division	Junior 1								
1957–58	Junior Edinburgh & District West Division	Junior 1|	1st							
1957–58	Junior East Play-off	Junior 1|	Winners							
1958–59	Junior Edinburgh & District West Division	Junior 1	1st							
1958–59	Junior East Play-off	Junior 1	Runners-up							
1959–60	Junior Edinburgh & District West Division	Junior 1								
1960–61	Junior Edinburgh & District West Division	Junior 1								
1961–62	Junior Edinburgh & District West Division	Junior 1								
1962–63	Junior Edinburgh & District West Division	Junior 1								
1963–64	Junior Edinburgh & District West Division	Junior 1								
1964–65	Junior Edinburgh & District West Division	Junior 1								
1965–66	Junior Edinburgh & District West Division	Junior 1								
1966–67	Junior Edinburgh & District West Division	Junior 1								
1967–68	Junior Edinburgh & District West Division	Junior 1								
1968–69	Junior East West Division	Junior 1	1st							
1968–69	Junior East Play-off	Junior 1	Winners							
1969–70	Junior East West Division	Junior 1								
1970–71	Junior East West Division	Junior 1								
1971–72	Junior East West Division	Junior 1								
1972–73	Junior East West Division	Junior 1								
1973–74	Junior East Division A	Junior 1	12th	24	6	7	11	−3	19	
1974–75	Junior East Division B	Junior 2	4th	22	10	7	5		27	
1975–76	Junior East Division A	Junior 1	5th	24	9	8	7	+5	26	Winners
1976–77	Junior East Division A	Junior 1								
1977–78	Junior East Division A	Junior 1	9th	24	11	2	11		24	
1978–79	Junior East Division A	Junior 1	9th	22	10	1	11		21	Runners-up
1979–80	Junior East Division A	Junior 1	4th	22	10	7	5		26	
1980–81	Junior East Division A	Junior 1	6th	22	6	11	5	-4	23	
1981–82	Junior East Division A	Junior 1	3rd	22	12	3	7	+20	27	
1982–83	Junior East Division A	Junior 1	5th	22	9	6	7	+3	24	Runners-up
1983–84	Junior East Division A	Junior 1	4th	22	12	2	8	+9	26	Winners
1984–85	Junior East Division A	Junior 1	5th	22	8	8	6	+15	24	
1985–86	Junior East Division A	Junior 1	5th	22	9	7	6	+10	25	
1986–87	Junior East Division A	Junior 1	8th	26	7	9	10	-7	23	
1987–88	Junior East Division A	Junior 1	9th	26	7	8	11	−15	22	
1988–89	Junior East Division A	Junior 1	8th	26	8	7	11	−9	23	
1989–90	Junior East Division A	Junior 1	2nd	22	9	8	5	+7	26	
1990–91	Junior East Division A	Junior 1	6th	22	8	8	6	+8	2	
1991–92	Junior East Division A	Junior 1	2nd	22	10	8	4	+7	28	
1992–93	Junior East Division 1	Junior 1	5th	22	10	6	6	+6	26	
1993–94	Junior East Division 1	Junior 1	9th	22	5	6	11	−6	16	
1994–95	Junior East Division 1	Junior 1	5th	22	8	8	6	+2	24	
1995–96	Junior East Division 1	Junior 1	8th	22	7	4	11	−1	25	
1996–97	Junior East Division 1	Junior 1	3rd	22	11	5	6	+14	38	
1997–98	Junior East Division 1	Junior 1	4th	22	12	3	7	+12	34	
1998–99	Junior East Division 1	Junior 1	9th	22	6	6	10	−8	24	
1999–2000	Junior East Division 1	Junior 1	4th	22	12	3	7	+15	39	
2000–01	Junior East Division 1	Junior 1	5th	22	10	6	6	+1	36	
2001–02	Junior East Division 1	Junior 1	7th	22	9	3	10	−3	30	
2002–03	Junior East Lothian Division 1	Junior 2	1st	18	10	5	4	+16	35	
2003–04	Junior East Super League	Junior 1	6th	22	8	8	6	+5	32	
2004–05	Junior East Super League	Junior 1	5th	22	10	5	7	+2	35	
2005–06	Junior East Super League	Junior 1	6th	22	8	8	6	+7	32	
2006–07	Junior East Super League	Junior 1	11th	22	6	3	13	−13	21	
2007–08	Junior East Premier League	Junior 2	1st	22	15	3	4	+20	48	
2008–09	Junior East Super League	Junior 1	10th	22	8	4	10	−12	24	
2009–10	Junior East Super League	Junior 1	1st	22	14	6	2	+30	48	
2010–11	Junior East Super League	Junior 1	1st	22	12	6	4	+12	64	Semi-final
2011–12	Junior East Super League	Junior 1	4th	20	7	6	7	−1	27	Quarter-final
2012–13	Junior East Super League	Junior 1	4th	22	11	5	6	+12	38	Quarter-final
2013–14	Junior East Super League	Junior 1	1st	30	22	3	5	+47	69	Quarter-final
2014–15	Junior East Super League	Junior 1	2nd	28	18	5	5	+34	59	Fourth round
2015–16	Junior East Super League	Junior 1	4th	30	17	5	8	+24	56	Third round
2016–17	Junior East Super League	Junior 1	3rd	30	17	4	9	+39	55	Third round
2017–18	Junior East Super League	Junior 1	8th	30	12	5	13	+4	41	Quarter-final

=== Senior ===
Season	Division	Tier	Pos.	Pld.	W	D	L	GD	Pts	Scottish Cup
2018–19	East of Scotland League Conference B	6	2nd	24	18	4	2	+54	58	Did Not Participate
2019–20	East of Scotland Premier Division	6	1st†	21	14	5	2	+20	47	Did Not Participate
2020–21	Lowland League	5	7th†	10	5	3	2	+9	18	First round, losing to Bonnyrigg Rose
2021–22	Lowland League	5	11th	34	10	4	20	-24	34	Second round, losing to Edinburgh City
2022–23	Lowland League	5	9th	36	16	6	14	+20	54	Second round, losing to Auchinleck Talbot
2023-24	Lowland League	5	3rd	34	21	4	9	+22	67	Third round, losing to Greenock Morton
2024-25	Lowland League	5	12th	34	10	9	15	-12	39	Third round, losing to Musselburgh Athletic
2025-26	Lowland League	5	9th	34	14	6	14	+5	48	First round, losing to Banks o' Dee

† Season curtailed due to COVID-19 pandemic.

== Honours ==
East of Scotland Football League Premier Division

- Winners : 2019–20

East of Scotland League Cup

- Winners: 2018–19

Scottish Junior Cup

- Winners: 1947–48, 1975–76, 1983–84
- Runners-up: 1946–47, 1978–79, 1982–83

Junior East Region Super League

- Winners: 2009–10, 2010–11, 2013–14
- Runners-up: 2014–15

=== Other honours ===
- Fife & Lothians Cup winners: 1993–94, 1996–97
- Edinburgh & District League winners: 1946–47, 1947–48, 1948–49, 1957–58
- East Region Division One winners: 1968–69
- Lothians District League Division One winners: 2002–03
- East of Scotland Junior Cup winners: 1951–52, 1954–55, 1984–85, 1998–99, 2015–16
- Brown Cup winners: 1978–79, 1982–83, 1983–84, 1987–88, 1996–97, 1997–98, 1998–99, 2006–07

== Notable former players ==
The following players all went on to be capped for the Scotland national football team after playing for Bo'ness United.

- Paddy Buckley – St Johnstone and Aberdeen. Played in United's 1947–48 Scottish Junior Cup winning team.
- Donald Ford – Hearts and Falkirk.
- Alex Scott – Rangers, Everton, Hibernian and Falkirk.
- Jim Scott – Hibernian, Newcastle United, Crystal Palace, Falkirk and Hamilton. Also a Junior international cap.

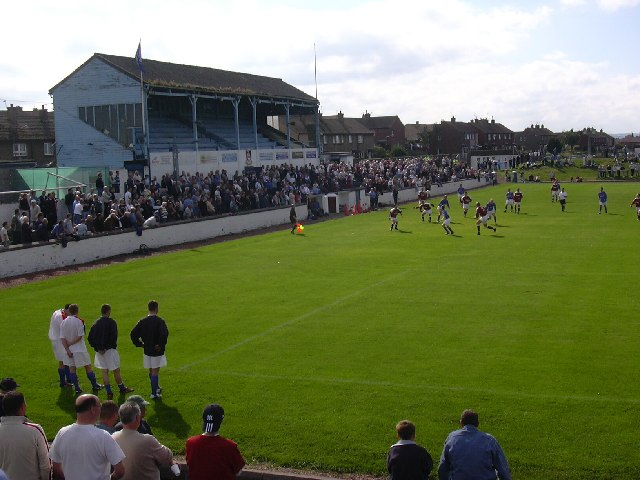
A match at Newtown Park in 2004
