= Hill of Beath Hawthorn F.C. =

Association football club in Scotland

Hill of Beath Hawthorn
- Full name: Hill of Beath Hawthorn Football Club
- Nickname: Haws
- Founded: 1975
- Ground: Keir's Park, Hill of Beath
- Capacity: 1,080
- Coordinates: 56.0959°N 3.3708°W
- Chairman: David Baillie
- Manager: Robbie Raeside
- League: Lowland League East
- 2025–26: East of Scotland League Premier Division, 1st of 16 (promoted)
- Website: http://www.hillofbeathhawthorn.co.uk/
Home colours	Away colours

Hill of Beath Hawthorn Football Club are a Scottish football club from Hill of Beath, near Cowdenbeath, Fife. Formed in 1975, they play their home games at Keir's Park. Their colours are red with white flashes.

They currently compete in the Lowland League East, having moved from the SJFA East Super League in 2018.

== History ==
The club played in the Kirkcaldy and District Amateur league until 1982 when they joined the Fife Junior League. The Haws won the Fife League eight times before becoming founding members of the East Region Super League in 2002. They spent all but one year in the Super League and finished runners-up three times, prior to their move to the East of Scotland League in 2018. A year later the club become full members of the Scottish Football Association, allowing them to enter the Scottish Cup for the first time in 2019–20, and also joined the Fife FA which enables them to compete in the Fife Cup.

Hill of Beath Hawthorn's greatest honour came in 1990, when they defeated Lesmahagow 1–0 in the final of the Scottish Junior Cup at Kilmarnock's Rugby Park.

The club were managed by Jock Finlayson from their formation in 1975 until the summer of 2015 when he was succeeded by Bobby Wilson. On 14 May 2017, Bobby Wilson left the club by mutual consent. On 20 May 2017, Kevin Fotheringham was named the new manager of the club. Kevin Fotheringham resigned as manager on 23 September 2019 after the Haws were knocked out the Scottish Cup by Gretna 2008.

Former club captain, John Mitchell, was appointed as manager of the club on 16 October 2019. John Mitchell resigned in September 2021

In September 2021, the club appointed former professional footballer Jason Dair as first-team manager. Dair, who made over 360 senior career appearances at clubs including Raith Rovers, Millwall, Dunfermline, Motherwell and Livingston, was joined by Lee Dair and Darrin Wright, both ex-Hill of Beath players, as first-team coaches, alongside Dave McNeely as goalkeeper coach.

== Ground ==
Keir's Park
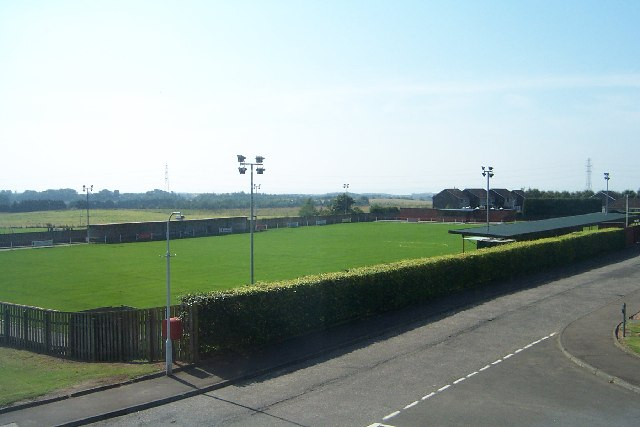
- View from Hawthorn Crescent
- Interactive map of Keir's Park
- Location: Hawthorn Crescent; Hill of Beath; Scotland
- Capacity: 1,080
- Surface: Grass
- Field size: 100 x 56 m

Tenants
- Hill of Beath Hawthorn (1982–); Hearts of Beath (1883–1941)

Hill of Beath Hawthorn play their home games at Keir's Park, situated on Hawthorn Crescent. The capacity of Keir's Park is 1,080 with the ground featuring covered enclosures of three sides of the pitch.

== Rivalries ==
The Haws share a fierce local rivalry with Scottish League One team Kelty Hearts.

Both clubs were founded the same year in 1975. The rivalry mainly stems from the close proximity of the two clubs and both being very successful "junior" sides within the Fife League. The Haws and Kelty would often exchange Fife league title wins from year to year, and also frequently meet in cup competitions.

Hill of Beath are currently one league below Kelty, competing in the Lowland League East,. However, they can still face each other in the Scottish Cup.

== Current squad ==
As of 4 August 2026

Note: Flags indicate national team as defined under FIFA eligibility rules; some limited exceptions apply. Players may hold more than one non-FIFA nationality.

No.	Pos.	Nation	Player
1	GK	SCO	Blair Penman
2	DF	SCO	Ryan Kelly
3	DF	SCO	Aiden Kay
4	DF	SCO	Scott Reekie
5	DF	SCO	Jake Mitchell (Captain)
6	DF	SCO	James Linton
7	FW	SCO	Jay Bridgeford
8	MF	SCO	Johnny Galloway
9	FW	SCO	Daniel Watt
10	FW	SCO	Liam Middleton
11	MF	SCO	Sam Featherstone

No.	Pos.	Nation	Player
14	DF	SCO	Brodie Gray
16	MF	SCO	Clark Bexfield
—	DF	SCO	Calum Runciman
17	FW	SCO	Steff Khyyam
—	MF	SCO	Scott Wilson
19	FW	SCO	Calum Adamson
20	FW	SCO	Ross Allum
21	GK	SCO	Finn McGuire
22	GK	SCO	Sam McGuff
—	DF	SCO	Connor Scott (On-loan at Dundonald Bluebell)
—	MF	SCO	Archie Margretts
—	MF	SCO	Brandon Luke
—	MF	SCO	Josh Proudfoot (on-loan at Cowdenbeath Central AFC)
—	MF	SCO	John Smith
—	MF	SCO	Kole Murray (On-loan at Sauchie Juniors)
—	FW	SCO	Stuart Love

== Coaching staff ==
Position	Name
Manager	Robbie Raeside
Assistant coach	Mitch Baldwin
First Team Coaches	Ewan Baillie and Ross Allum (Player/Coach)
Goalkeeping coach	Sam McGuff
Physio	Carolyn Addis
Kit manager	Rory Mutter

== Season-by-season record ==
=== Senior ===
Season	Division	Pos.	Pld.	W	D	L	GD	Pts	Scottish Cup
Hill of Beath Hawthorn
2018–19	East of Scotland League Conference A	2nd	24	20	2	2	+82	62	Did Not Participate
2019–20	East of Scotland Premier Division	2nd†	18	10	5	3	+25	37*	First round, losing to Gretna 2008

† Season curtailed due to COVID-19 pandemic - Hill of Beath Hawthorn finished second, based on the 'points per game' measure.

- Hill of Beath Hawthorn were awarded 2 points after Sauchie fielded a suspended player in their match on 27 July 2019.

== Honours ==
=== Major Honours ===
Scottish Junior Cup

- Winners: 1989–90

SJFA East Super League

- Runners-up: 2002–03, 2010–11, 2011–12

=== Other honours ===
- Fife Junior League winners: 1986–87, 1988–89, 1993–94, 1994–95, 1995–96, 1997–98, 1999–00, 2001–02
- SJFA Fife District League winners: 2004–05
- East of Scotland Junior Cup: 2014–15
- Fife & Lothians (Heineken) Cup: 1995–96
- Fife & Tayside Cup: 1995–96, 2000–01, 2001–02, 2002–03, 2004–05
- Fife League Cup: 2004–05, 2007–08, 2008–09, 2010–11, 2011–12
- Fife Junior (PSM) Cup: 1990–91, 1993–94, 1994–95, 1995–96, 2001–02, 2002–03, 2005–06
- Cowdenbeath (Interbrew) Cup: 1988–89, 1989–90, 1991–92, 1993–94, 1994–95, 1996–97, 1997–98, 2000–01, 2002–03
- Kingdom Kegs Cup: 1997–98, 1999–00
- Laidlaw Shield winners: 1985–86, 1987–88, 1989–90
- Fife Drybrough Cup: 1985–86

== Notable former players ==
- Tommy McDonald (M) (1948–49) Scotland B international
