= Camelon Juniors F.C. =

Association football club in Scotland

Camelon Juniors FC
- Full name: Camelon Juniors Football Club
- Nickname: The Mariners
- Founded: 1920
- Ground: Carmuirs Park, Camelon
- Capacity: 3,000
- Coordinates: 56°0′2″N 3°49′11″W
- Chairman: David Smith
- Manager: Thomas Scobbie
- League: East of Scotland League Premier Division
- 2025–26: East of Scotland League Premier Division, 4th of 16
- Website: http://www.camelonjuniors.co.uk/
Home colours	Away colours

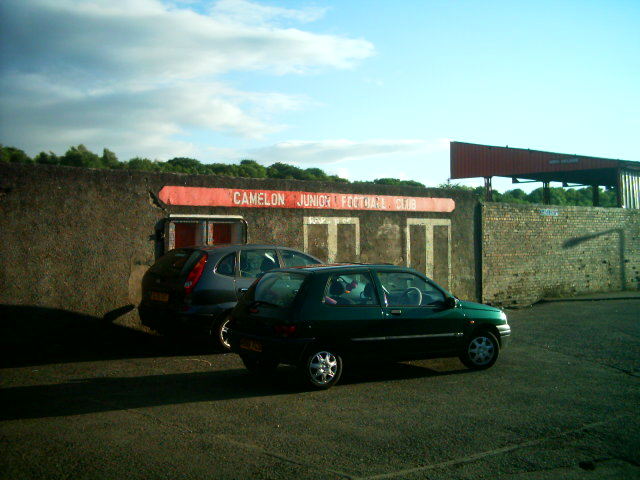
Turnstiles at Carmuirs Park

Camelon Juniors Football Club are a Scottish football club based in Camelon, in the Falkirk district. The team plays in the East of Scotland League Premier Division, having moved from the junior leagues in 2018. Despite this move, the club has decided to retain the "Juniors" part of its identity. The club have won the Scottish Junior Cup once, in 1995.

== History ==
A previous Camelon side had existed in the Junior grade from 1906 to 1910, however the current club were formed in 1920. This Camelon Juniors side initially competed in Stirlingshire competitions but became the easternmost side to join the breakaway Scottish Intermediate League in 1927, ironically joining the West Division of the new set-up. The club resigned from the Intermediates halfway through the 1929–30 season and joined the Scottish Junior League which at the time, contained fellow Stirlingshire sides Dunipace and Kilsyth Rangers. Camelon remained with the SJL up to and including its solitary post-World War II season before moving in 1947 to the Edinburgh & District League.

Camelon made their first appearance in the final of the Scottish Junior Cup in 1952, losing 1–0 to Kilbirnie Ladeside at Hampden Park in front of 69,959 supporters. John Hansen, father of future Scotland internationalists Alan and John, played for the Mariners at centre-half. The club made consecutive final appearances in the 1990s, defeating Whitburn 2–0 at Fir Park, Motherwell in 1995, to lift the trophy for the first time, then losing by the same scoreline to Tayport at the same venue a year later.

The club provided several players to Rangers over the years, including Jerry Dawson and Archie Macaulay, who both went on to become full Scotland internationals with Macaulay going on to play for West Ham United and Arsenal. Max Murray also arrived at Ibrox from Camelon via Queen's Park, and scored Rangers first ever goal in European competition against OGC Nice in 1956. Notable ex-Camelon players in more recent times include former Chelsea and Falkirk winger Kevin McAllister and Jack Ross. Ross was a member of Camelon's losing 1996 Scottish Junior Cup final side and was also capped for the Scotland Junior international team.

After winning the Lothian District League Division One in 2005–06, the club played in the top tier of the East Region for twelve seasons until their move to the senior pyramid. Their best finish in the East Superleague was 2nd in 2008–09, losing to Bonnyrigg Rose on goal difference. Camelon were one of many junior clubs that moved to the senior East of Scotland Football League during 2018.

The team had been managed since October 2016 by former Dumbarton striker, Gordon Herd. The club parted with Herd and his coaching staff on 11 March 2021.

=== Scottish Cup ===
Camelon entered the Scottish Cup for the first time in 2019–20 as winners of the South & East of Scotland Cup-Winners' Shield, and then subsequently as an SFA member having gained their club licence the following year. They reached the second round in the 2022–23 campaign where they were defeated away at Elgin City.

Their best run was achieved in the 2025–26 edition, making it to the fourth round having beaten SPFL opposition for the first time (Edinburgh City), before again going out of the competition to Elgin City.

== Colours ==
Camelon's traditional home kit is all red, with the team currently possessing an away kit of blue tops with blue shorts.

== Current squad ==
As of 21 June 2026

Note: Flags indicate national team as defined under FIFA eligibility rules; some limited exceptions apply. Players may hold more than one non-FIFA nationality.

No.	Pos.	Nation	Player
1	GK	SCO	Dean Shaw
3	DF	SCO	Declan Fitzpatrick
4	DF	SCO	Lewis McArthur (Captain)
5	DF	SCO	David Ferguson
6	MF	SCO	Kyle Johnston
7	MF	SCO	Callum Bremner
8	MF	SCO	Jordan Kirkpatrick
9	FW	SCO	Allan MacKenzie
10	MF	SCO	Robbie Hamilton
11	FW	SCO	Ben Scarborough

No.	Pos.	Nation	Player
14	FW	SCO	James Finlay
16	FW	SCO	Alan Sneddon
17	MF	SCO	Nathan Wade
19	MF	SCO	Graham Taylor
20	FW	SCO	Connor Falls
21	GK	SCO	Jamie Dick
23	DF	SCO	Ryan Lockie
27	DF	SCO	Cameron Rowley
28	MF	ENG	Thierry Mafukidze
—	DF	SCO	Calum Roger
—	DF	SCO	Jamie McCormack

== On loan ==
Note: Flags indicate national team as defined under FIFA eligibility rules; some limited exceptions apply. Players may hold more than one non-FIFA nationality.

No.	Pos.	Nation	Player
—	FW	SCO	Marc Shand (on loan at Stoneyburn)

== Coaching staff ==
Position	Name
Manager	Tam Scobbie
Assistant manager	Dean Shanks
Development Squad coaches	Kenny Knox and Alan Upton
Chief Scout	Ian Campbell

== Honours ==
Scottish Junior Cup

- Winners: 1994–95
- Runners-up: 1951–52, 1995–96

East of Scotland Football League First Division

- Winners: 2024–25

=== Other Honours ===
- East of Scotland Qualifying Cup winners: 2025–26
- South & East of Scotland Cup-Winners' Shield winners: 2018–19
- Alex Jack Cup winners: 2018–19
- East Region Division One winners: 1979–80, 1993–94, 1994–95
- Fife & Lothians Cup winners: 1970–71, 2005–06, 2007–08, 2014–15
- Lothian District League Division One winners: 2003–04, 2005–06
- East of Scotland Junior Cup winners: 1993–94, 2007–08
- East Junior League Cup winners: 1993–94
- Brown Cup winners: 1976–77
- St Michaels Cup winners: 2004–05
