= Bonnyrigg Rose F.C. =

Association football club in Scotland

Bonnyrigg Rose
- Full name: Bonnyrigg Rose Football Club
- Nickname: The Rose
- Founded: 1881
- Ground: New Dundas Park; Bonnyrigg
- Capacity: 3,000
- Chairperson: Ian Durie
- Manager: Jonny Stewart
- League: Lowland League East
- 2025–26: Lowland League, 3rd of 18
- Website: https://www.bonnyriggrosefc.co.uk
Home colours	Away colours	Third colours

Bonnyrigg Rose Football Club is a Scottish football club from the town of Bonnyrigg. Formed in 1881 and nicknamed the Rose, the team plays in the Lowland League East, having been relegated in 2024–25.

Their home ground is New Dundas Park, and they have traditionally played in red and white hoops. They have won the Scottish Junior Cup twice, in 1966 and in 1978, as well as finishing runners-up in 1972. Their 6–1 defeat of Whitburn in 1966 holds a joint record for the margin of victory in a Scottish Junior Cup final. Bonnyrigg won the East Region Super League championship four times during their membership, making them the league's most successful side.

At a special general meeting held in March 2018, the club's members voted in favour of applying to join the senior East of Scotland Football League. Bonnyrigg were part of a larger movement of eastern junior clubs to the East of Scotland League that year. In 2019, they won promotion to the Lowland League and successfully applied for Scottish Football Association membership. In 2022, they won promotion to Scottish League Two, thus entering the Scottish Professional Football League for the first time, and after doing so, changed their name from Bonnyrigg Rose Athletic to the more streamlined Bonnyrigg Rose.

== History ==
=== Scottish Cup ===
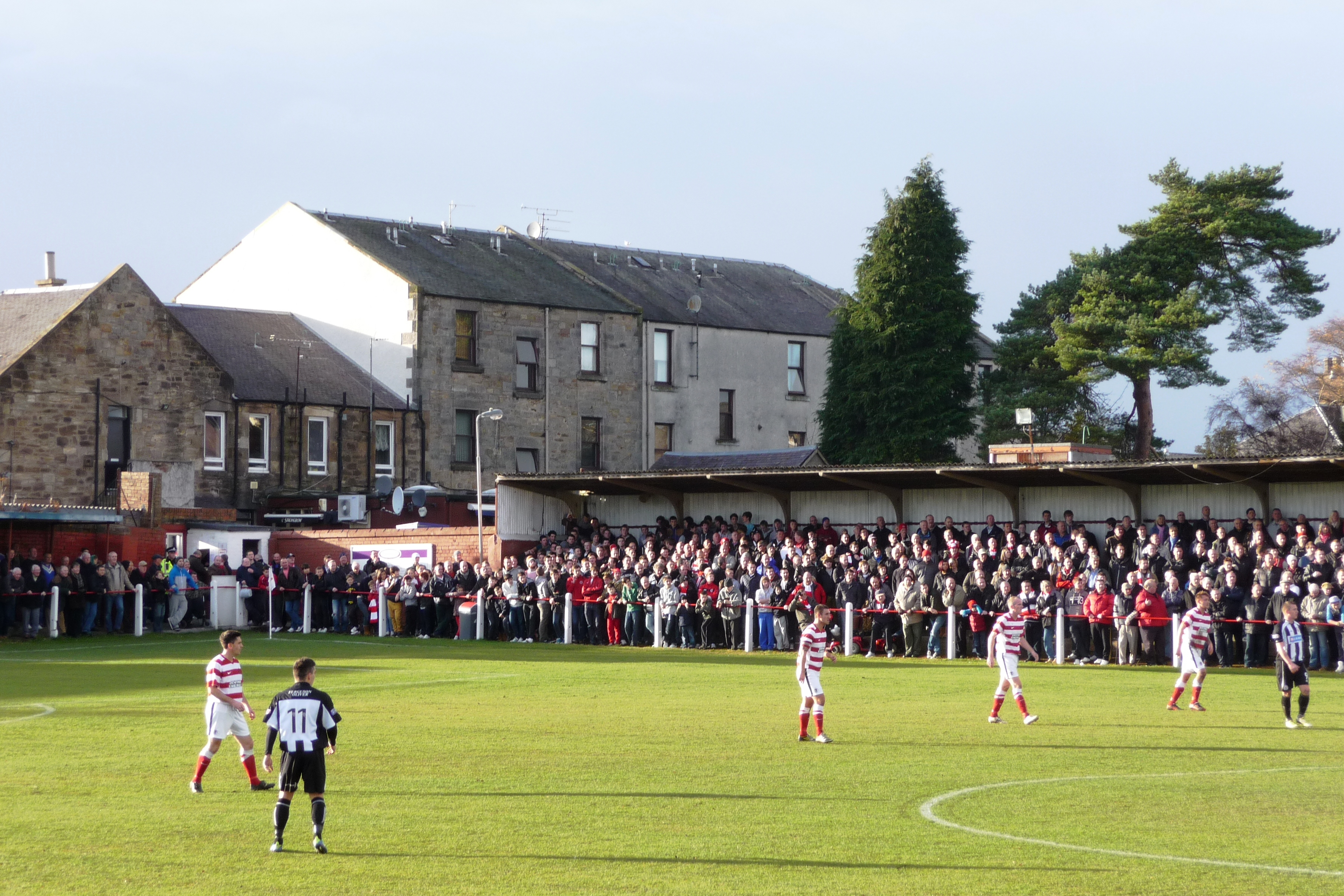
Bonnyrigg host Brechin City in 2012–13's third round

Prior to becoming an SFA member in 2019, Bonnyrigg qualified to enter the senior Scottish Cup by winning the East Superleague on four occasions.

In their first campaign in 2009–10, Bonnyrigg lost in their opening tie to Highland League club Fraserburgh. Better results were achieved in 2012–13, losing to SFL Second Division side Brechin City in a third round replay after wins over Girvan and Stirling University.

The third Scottish Cup adventure in 2016–17 was their most successful. The Rose easily saw off Glasgow University and then defeated Burntisland Shipyard 14–0, the biggest win in the competition since 1984. This was followed by wins over Highland sides Turriff United and Cove Rangers. In an upset, Bonnyrigg then eliminated Dumbarton of the Scottish Championship after a replay to progress to the Fourth Round. They were drawn at home against the cup holders Hibernian, with the match moved to Tynecastle Stadium in Edinburgh to accommodate the expected number of spectators and the basic facilities at New Dundas Park. The result, an 8–1 defeat, was a disappointing end to the run for the team and the 5,000 fans who had travelled from Midlothian to give their support.

The club qualified again for the Scottish Cup in 2018–19, having won the East Superleague for a record fourth time. Now playing in the senior pyramid, this campaign ultimately ended in disappointment for the club, losing 2–1 to Deveronvale in the first round. 2018 also saw them take part in the inaugural Shaun Woodburn Memorial Cup, established in memory of former player Woodburn, who had been killed on the previous Hogmanay.

In June 2019, the club announced it had been accepted as a member of the Scottish Football Association, which would allow them to automatically qualify for the Scottish Cup annually. In their first Scottish Cup as a licensed team, Bonnyrigg would once again go on an impressive run, defeating Highland League sides Fraserburgh and Buckie Thistle before dispatching Scottish League One side Montrose 2–1 at New Dundas Park, despite being a man down. In the Fourth round, Bonnyrigg would again valiantly fight against a League One team, but could not repeat their heroics and lost 0–1 late on to Clyde.

Entering in the Second round in 2020–21, Bonnyrigg would defeat fellow Lowland Leaguers Bo'ness United 5–2, with Lee Currie scoring a hat-trick of penalties within 10 minutes of each other. In the next round, the Rosey Posey would nearly have a cup upset for the ages, with another Currie penalty and a strong performance from keeper Mark Weir nearly knocking out Scottish Championship side Dundee before a late equaliser sent the game to extra time. Currie again put Bonnyrigg ahead from the spot, but two goals by Dundee in the second half of extra time ended the club's dream.

=== Lowland League ===
Rose were promoted to the Lowland League in 2019 after winning the East of Scotland Football League and gaining SFA membership. They took the place of relegated Whitehill Welfare, based only two miles from Bonnyrigg in the village of Rosewell, Midlothian. After finishing second and third in their first two seasons, both curtailed by the COVID-19 pandemic, the following season they went on to win the league title in 2021–22.

== Current squad ==
As of 12 September 2026

Note: Flags indicate national team as defined under FIFA eligibility rules; some limited exceptions apply. Players may hold more than one non-FIFA nationality.

No.	Pos.	Nation	Player
1	GK	SCO	Jack Lyon (on loan from Heart of Midlothian)
2	MF	SCO	Jay McGarva
3	DF	SCO	Neil Martyniuk (Captain)
4	DF	SCO	Kerr Young
5	DF	SCO	Kieran Somerville
6	MF	SCO	Callum Connolly
7	MF	SWE	Alassan Jones
8	DF	SCO	Kieran Watson
9	FW	SCO	Laurie Devine
10	MF	SCO	Lee Currie
11	MF	SCO	Billy King
12	MF	SCO	Harry Waldman
14	MF	SCO	Brodie Armstrong
15	MF	SCO	Ross Gray
16	MF	SCO	Taylor Hogarth (on loan from St Mirren)

No.	Pos.	Nation	Player
17	FW	SCO	Mackenzie Scott
19	FW	SCO	Jordan Smith
20	MF	SCO	Rudi Bryce
21	MF	SCO	Bradley Barrett
22	MF	SCO	Scott Robinson
23	DF	SCO	Josh Laing
25	GK	SCO	Marc Anderson
TBC	GK	SCO	Ryan Mallon (on loan from Hibernian)
—	DF	SCO	Aidan Martin
—	MF	SCO	Scott Walker
—	DF	SCO	Callum Gardiner
—	MF	SCO	Callum Hogg
—	MF	SCO	Max Dowling
—	FW	SCO	Andy Logan

=== On loan ===
Note: Flags indicate national team as defined under FIFA eligibility rules; some limited exceptions apply. Players may hold more than one non-FIFA nationality.

No.	Pos.	Nation	Player
—	MF	SCO	Ryan Porteous (On-loan at Musselburgh Athletic)

== Coaching staff ==
- Manager: Jonny Stewart
- Assistant manager: Ross Gray
- Coach: Scott McNaughton
- Goalkeeping coach: Graeme Smith
- Strength & Conditioning Coach: Rhys Black
- Sports therapist: Danielle McNaught

== Managers ==
The team was managed from June 2015 until August 2017 by former Berwick Rangers player and assistant manager, Robbie Horn. Horn resigned in August 2017 to take over the vacant managerial position at Berwick. He later returned as manager in November 2018.

== Season-by-season record ==
=== Senior ===
Season	Division	Tier	Pos.	P	W	D	L	GD	Pts	Scottish Cup	League Cup	Challenge Cup
2018–19	East of Scotland League Conference B	6	1st	24	22	1	1	+88	67	First round	—N/a	—N/a
2019–20	Lowland League	5	2nd†	24	20	2	2	+48	62	Fourth round	—N/a	—N/a
2020–21	Lowland League	5	3rd†	12	9	2	1	+23	29	Second round	—N/a	—N/a
2021–22	Lowland League	5	1st	34	28	3	3	+64	87	Third round	—N/a	First round
2022–23	Scottish League Two	4	8th	36	11	9	16	–11	42	Second round	Group stage	First round
2023–24	Scottish League Two	4	8th	36	9	12	15	−1	39	Fifth round	Group stage	First round
2024–25	Scottish League Two	4	10th	36	12	6	18	−22	36	Second round	Group stage	Second round
2025–26	Lowland League	5	3rd	34	21	6	7	+37	69	Third round	Group Stage	−
2026–27	Lowland League East	5										

† Season curtailed due to COVID-19 pandemic.

== Honours ==
=== Major honours ===
- Lowland League
  - Champions: 2021–22
- East of Scotland League
  - Champions: 2018–19
  - Conference B Winners: 2018–19
- Scottish Junior Cup
  - Winners: 1965–66, 1977–78
  - Runners-up: 1971–72
- SJFA East Region Super League
  - Winners: 2008–09, 2011–12, 2015–16, 2017–18
  - Runners-up: 2006–07, 2012–13, 2016–17

=== Other honours ===
- Edinburgh & District League: 1937–38, 1963–64
- East Region Division One: 1975–76, 1976–77, 1984–85
- East of Scotland Junior Cup: 1897–98, 1962–63, 1985–86, 1986–87, 2002–03, 2005–06, 2012–13
- Fife & Lothians Cup: 1981–82, 2004–05, 2006–07, 2017–18
- Lanark & Lothians Cup: 1963–64, 1965–66
- National Dryburgh Cup: 1985–86
- East Region Division Two: 1983–84
- East Junior League Cup: 1975–76, 1983–84, 1984–85, 1987–88, 2000–01
- Brown Cup: 1933–34, 1963–64, 1973–74, 1977–78, 1985–86, 2004–05, 2005–06, 2006–07
- St. Michaels Cup: 1965–66, 1970–71, 1974–75
- RL Rae Cup: 1974–75
- Peter Craigie Cup: 1992–93
- Thornton Shield: 1955–56, 1956–57
- Dalmeny Cup: 1922–23
- Marshall Cup: 1913–14
- Musselburgh Cup: 1909–10, 1924–25
- Roseberry Charity Cup: 1937–38
- Simpson Shield: 1905–06
- Andy Kelly Memorial Cup: 2006

== Notable former players ==
- Per Bartram (F) (1978) Denmark international
- Jim Begbie (D) (1968–1972) Represented Hong Kong League XI
- Ally Brazil (D) (1992–1993) Scotland under-21 international
- Sean Connery (early 1950s) future actor
- Graham Harvey (F) (1998–1999) Represented Hong Kong League XI
- Jim Hermiston (M) (1964–1965) Scotland under-23 international
- Jimmy Mackay (M) (1961–1964) Represented Australia in the 1974 FIFA World Cup having scored the decisive goal in the final qualifier
- Billy Neil (M) Made 186 Football League appearances for Millwall
- Craig Paterson (D) (1977–1979) Scotland under-21 international and Scotland's most expensive player in 1982
- Chris Robertson (F) (1990s) Scotland under-21 international
- Pat Stanton (M) (1961–1963) 16 caps for Scotland
- John White (M) (1955–1956) 22 caps for Scotland (3 goals)
- Tommy White (F) Scotland under-23 international
