= Newtongrange Star F.C. =

Association football club in Scotland

Newtongrange Star
- Full name: Newtongrange Star Football Club
- Nicknames: The Star, Nitten
- Founded: 1890
- Ground: New Victoria Park, Newtongrange
- Capacity: 2,300 (30 seated)
- Coordinates: 55°52′18″N 3°4′19″W
- Manager: Paul Milligan
- League: East of Scotland League Premier Division
- 2025–26: East of Scotland League First Division, 11th of 16
- Website: http://newtongrangestarfc.co.uk/
Home colours	Away colours

Newtongrange Star Football Club is a Scottish football club based in the village of Newtongrange, Midlothian. The home ground is New Victoria Park. The facility includes an enclosed pitch with full floodlighting, covered enclosure, changing rooms, with a separate social club. The club also runs an actively used 7-a-side all-weather pitch, also floodlit.

== History ==
Star reached the 1991 Scottish Junior Cup Final before narrowly losing 1–0 to Auchinleck Talbot in an evenly matched contest.

The SJFA restructured prior to the 2006–07 season, and Star found themselves in the 15-team East Region, South Division. They finished as champions in their first season in the division and were promoted to the Premier League. The following season, they just missed promotion to the Superleague, which was achieved in the following season, 2008–09.

While still in the Premier League, the Star defeated Superleague teams in their League Cup run, reaching the final against Camelon played at Bathgate. After 90 minutes, the game was tied at 1-1. Going to a penalty shootout, the Star won with a series of saves from the Starkeeper. This was the first silverware for the club in some 20 years. In the Scottish Junior Cup, progress was made to the quarterfinal only to concede to Kirkintilloch Rob Roy.

The first season in the Superleague ended with a creditable fourth position after having been in second place for much of the season. However, the 2010–11 season with a limited squad was less successful, resulting in Graeme Armstrong resigning as manager in February 2011. During his five years at the club, Armstrong built a team around a few experienced players, but mainly younger players with pace and skill. The teams he put out played an expansive game, with fit players playing at a high tempo but with discipline, which drew plaudits from the supporters of the club and opposition alike.

John Coughlin, an ex-player and former manager of senior clubs like St. Mirren, Stenhousemuir, and Berwick Rangers, stepped in on a temporary basis while a permanent appointment was made. On 12 May 2011, Alan Miller, an ex-player and most recently manager of Bonnyrigg Rose, was appointed manager. He brought with him his assistants at Bonnyrigg, Ian Black, and Finlay Wells.

The team currently plays in the East of Scotland Football League (First Division), having moved from the SJFA East Region Super League in 2018.

Nitten have been managed by former player Chris King since November 2019.

On 26 March 2023, Newtongrange Star Football Club can confirm Chris King has decided to step down as manager.

On 23 April 2023, Newtowngrange Star Football Club can confirm Paul Milligan has been appointed the new manager.

== Current squad ==
As of 23 July 2026

Note: Flags indicate national team as defined under FIFA eligibility rules; some limited exceptions apply. Players may hold more than one non-FIFA nationality.

No.	Pos.	Nation	Player
1	GK	SCO	Kyle Leiper
TBC	GK	SCO	Liam McCathie
TBC	GK	SCO	Harry Moffat
21	GK	SCO	James McQueen
5	DF	SCO	Liam Reid
4	DF	SCO	Ciaran Mckenzie
6	DF	SCO	Jayden Bradley
2	DF	SCO	Scott Brogan
3	DF	SCO	Sam Buchanan
7	MF	SCO	Shaun Conlon

No.	Pos.	Nation	Player
18	MF	SCO	Fyn Connor
9	FW	SCO	Frazer Sutherland
24	FW	SCO	Arran Laidlaw
—	FW	SCO	Mark McGovern
11	FW	SCO	Aidan Barrowman
22	FW	SCO	Mikey Jones
TBC	FW	GRE	Adrianos Anagnostu
TBC	MF	SCO	Ian Galloway
—	FW	SCO	Mitchell Bentley
—	FW	SCO	Ryan Quinn

=== Out on loan ===
Note: Flags indicate national team as defined under FIFA eligibility rules; some limited exceptions apply. Players may hold more than one non-FIFA nationality.

No.	Pos.	Nation	Player
—	DF	SCO	Riley Carson (on-loan at Heriot-Watt University until January 2027)

== Staff ==
=== Coaching staff ===
Position	Name
Manager	Paul Milligan
Assistant Manager	Kris Murdoch
First Team coach	Scott Reid
First Team coach	Rab Ure
Goalkeeping coach	Shane Thomson
Sports Therapist	Bernie Morocco

== Honours ==
Scottish Junior Cup

- Winner: 1929–30

SJFA East Region Premier League

- Winners: 2012–13
- Runners-up: 2008–09

=== Other Honours ===
- East of Scotland Cup winner: 1906–07, 1925–26, 1929–30, 1957–58, 1958–59, 1974–75, 1976–77, 1979–80, 1981–82, 1991–92, 1996–97, 2010–11
- Midlothian Junior League winner: 1905–06, 1906–07, 1907–08, 1919–20, 1920–21
- Edinburgh & District League winner: 1921–22, 1922–23, 1923–24, 1924–25, 1925–26, 1926–27, 1929–30, 1932–33, 1950–51, 1951–52, 1954–55, 1958–59
- East Region Premier League winner: 1990–91, 1991–92
- East Region B Division winner: 1974–75, 1976–77
- East Region South Division: 2006–07
- Dechmont Forklift South League Cup winner: 2008–09
- Brown Cup winner: 1951–52, 1952–53, 1961–62, 1980–81, 1989–90, 1991–92, 1992–93, 1993–94
- St Michael Cup winner: 1927–28, 1950–51, 1961–62
- National Dryborough Cup winner: 1974–75
- Fife & Lothians Cup winner: 1977–78, 1987–88, 1989–90, 1990–91
- East Junior League Cup winner: 1989–90, 1991–92, 1992–93, 1996–97, 2008–09
- Peter Craigie Cup winner: 1989–90, 1991–92

== Notable former players ==
- Bobby Johnstone
- Willie Bauld
- Freddie Glidden
- Dave Mackay
- Alex Munro
- Alex Young
- John Hughes
- John Coughlin
- Walter Kidd
