= St Andrews United F.C. =

Association football club in Scotland

St Andrews United
- Full name: St Andrews United Football Club
- Nicknames: United, Saints
- Founded: 17 May 1921
- Ground: The Clayton Caravan Park Recreation Ground; Langlands Road; St Andrews
- Capacity: 766
- Coordinates: 56°20′4″N 2°47′30″W
- Chairman: Fraser Ogston
- Manager: Greg Shields
- League: East of Scotland League Premier Division
- 2025–25: East of Scotland League Premier Division, 10th of 16
- Website: https://standrewsutd.co.uk/
Home colours	Away colours

St Andrews United Football Club is a Scottish football club based in St Andrews, Fife. Founded in 1921, their home ground is The Clayton Caravan Park Recreation Ground. The team colours are black shirts with black shorts and black socks. The team plays in the East of Scotland League Premier Division, having moved from the junior leagues in 2018.

The club's greatest achievement was winning the Scottish Junior Cup in season 1959–60, defeating Greenock Juniors 3–1 in front of 34,603 fans at Hampden Park. The club has enjoyed sporadic success since.

The team has been managed by former Dundee, Raith Rovers, and Arbroath defender Robbie Raeside since May 2022. He is joined by Gary Wright, formerly of Dunfermline Athletic coaching team, since the more recent departure assistant manager of Steven Fallon to Forfar Athletic in December 2022 now fast forward to 2025 the team are currently managed by former professional Scottish defender Greg Shields.

== Honours ==
Scottish Junior Cup

- Winners: 1959–60

SJFA East Region Premier League

- Winners: 2010–11

SJFA East Region Central League

- Winners: 2008–09

Fife Cup

- Winners: 2025-26

=== Other Honours ===
- Fife Cup: 1926–27, 1927–28, 1928–29, 1959–60, 1965–66, 1988–89, 1989–90, 2004–05
- Fife Junior League: 1926–27, 1927–28, 1928–29, 1959–60, 1960–61, 1964–65, 1989–90
- East of Scotland Junior Cup: 2011–12
- Rosslyn Cup: 1959–60, 1989–90

== Squad ==
Note: Flags indicate national team as defined under FIFA eligibility rules; some limited exceptions apply. Players may hold more than one non-FIFA nationality.

No.	Pos.	Nation	Player
—	GK	SCO	Logan Halliday
—	DF	SCO	Alexander McCreadie
—	DF	SCO	Jacob Shyngle
—	DF	SCO	Jason Thomson
—	DF	SCO	Kyle Sneddon
—	DF	SCO	Tom Milne
—	DF	SCO	Michael Ness
—	MF	SCO	David Maskrey
—	MF	SCO	Lewis Milne
—	MF	SCO	Ross Cunningham
—	MF	SCO	Ryan McManus (Captain)
—	FW	SCO	Greig Spence
—	FW	SCO	James Collins
—	FW	SCO	Joe Aitken
—	FW	SCO	Lewis Payne
—	FW	SCO	Lewis Sawers
