= 2019–20 East Superleague =

Scottish junior football season

McBookie.com East Superleague
- Season: 2019–20
- Dates: 3 August 2019 – 7 March 2020 (abandoned)
- Champions: None

The 2019–20 East Super League (known as the McBookie.com East Superleague for sponsorship reasons) was the 18th season of the East Superleague, the top tier of league competition for SJFA East Region member clubs.

The league was split into North and South regional divisions, both containing 10 teams playing each other three times for a total of 27 games. The winners of each division were due to play each other in a two-legged play-off to determine the overall champion. The season began on 3 August 2019 and was scheduled to end on 25 April 2020. Lochee United were the reigning champions.

As a result of the COVID-19 pandemic, the league was indefinitely suspended on 13 March 2020. The season was officially cancelled on 10 April 2020 following a decision made by the East Region Management Committee, due to the uncertainty surrounding the pandemic and the Scottish Football Association's decision to extend the football shutdown until at least 10 June 2020.

On 16 April 2020 the East Region Management Committee declared the 2019–20 season null and void.

== Teams ==
The following teams changed division after the 2018–19 season.

=== To East Superleague ===
Promoted from East Premier League North

- Dundee North End
- Luncarty
- Scone Thistle

Promoted from East Premier League South

- Armadale Thistle
- Bathgate Thistle
- Harthill Royal
- Livingston United
- Lochore Welfare
- Pumpherston

=== From East Superleague ===
Transferred to East of Scotland League

- Glenrothes

== North ==
McBookie.com East Super League North
- Season: 2019–20
- Dates: 3 August 2019 – 7 March 2020 (abandoned)
- Champions: None
- Relegated: None
- Matches: 92
- Goals: 358 (3.89 per match)
- Biggest home win: Carnoustie Panmure 6–0 Scone Thistle; (3 August 2019); Broughty Athletic 6–0 Tayport; (7 December 2019)
- Biggest away win: Luncarty 0–5 Dundee North End; (21 September 2019)
- Highest scoring: Tayport 3–7 Dundee North End; (24 August 2019)
- Longest winning run: 7 games: Carnoustie Panmure
- Longest unbeaten run: 14 games: Carnoustie Panmure
- Longest winless run: 11 games: Scone Thistle
- Longest losing run: 9 games: Scone Thistle
- All statistics correct as of 7 March 2020.

=== Stadia and locations ===
Club	Location	Home Ground	Capacity	Seats	Floodlit	Finishing position 2018–19
Broughty Athletic	Dundee	Whitton Park	2,500	0	Yes	2nd
Carnoustie Panmure	Carnoustie	Laing Park	1,500	0	No	7th
Dundee North End	Dundee	North End Park	2,000	0	Yes	1st in Premier League North
Downfield	Dundee	Downfield Park	2,500	13	Yes	11th
Forfar West End	Forfar	Strathmore Park	2,500	0	No	6th
Kirriemuir Thistle	Kirriemuir	Westview Park	2,000	32	Yes	9th
Lochee United	Dundee	Thomson Park	3,200	0	No	1st
Luncarty	Luncarty	Brownlands Park	1,200	0	No	2nd in Premier League North
Scone Thistle	Scone	Farquharson Park	1,000	0	No	4th in Premier League North
Tayport	Tayport	Canniepairt	2,000	0	No	5th

=== League table ===
Pos	Team	Pld	W	D	L	GF	GA	GD	Pts	Qualification or relegation
1	Carnoustie Panmure	19	15	3	1	60	21	+39	48	
2	Broughty Athletic	19	12	4	3	51	24	+27	40	
3	Lochee United	16	12	1	3	41	18	+23	37	
4	Downfield	18	7	5	6	24	25	−1	26	
5	Dundee North End	18	6	4	8	34	41	−7	22	
6	Luncarty	21	6	3	12	40	51	−11	21	Resigned membership, joined East of Scotland League
7	Tayport	17	6	2	9	33	40	−7	20	
8	Kirriemuir Thistle	19	4	4	11	35	55	−20	16	
9	Scone Thistle	19	5	1	13	16	46	−30	16	
10	Forfar West End	18	3	5	10	24	37	−13	14	

Source: SJFA
Rules for classification: 1) Points; 2) Goal difference; 3) Goals scored

=== Results ===
==== Double round-robin ====
Home \ Away	BRO	CAR	DOW	DNE	FWE	KIR	LOC	LUN	SCO	TAY
Broughty Athletic		1–3	2–0	5–0	5–1	2–1		6–3	3–1	3–0
Carnoustie Panmure			4–0	2–2	3–1	5–2	2–4	3–1	6–0	5–0
Downfield	1–1			2–4	1–1		2–1	1–0	4–0	0–0
Dundee North End	1–2	1–4	2–2		1–0	0–0	3–1	1–1	1–2	
Forfar West End	1–1	0–2	0–1	2–4		3–3	0–2	2–5	1–0	
Kirriemuir Thistle	1–3	1–4	3–5	3–0	4–4		0–2	4–3	3–0	1–3
Lochee United	4–0		2–1	4–0	2–1	3–3			2–1	
Luncarty	2–2	2–3	0–2	0–5	0–3	5–0	3–2		0–1	3–5
Scone Thistle			0–1		0–4	4–3	0–3	2–1		1–2
Tayport		2–3		3–7	0–0	1–2	2–3	4–1	1–2	

Source: SJFA
Legend: Blue = home team win; Yellow = draw; Red = away team win.

==== Single round-robin ====
Home \ Away	BRO	CAR	DOW	DNE	FWE	KIR	LOC	LUN	SCO	TAY
Broughty Athletic		2–2						1–3	3–0	6–0
Carnoustie Panmure			1–0						5–0	
Downfield										
Dundee North End	0–3									
Forfar West End										
Kirriemuir Thistle										
Lochee United			3–0		3–0					
Luncarty		2–2				3–1				
Scone Thistle			1–1					1–2		
Tayport		0–1		5–2		5–0				

Source: SJFA
Legend: Blue = home team win; Yellow = draw; Red = away team win.

== South ==
McBookie.com East Super League South
- Season: 2019–20
- Dates: 3 August 2019 – 7 March 2020 (abandoned)
- Champions: None
- Relegated: None
- Matches: 86
- Goals: 358 (4.16 per match)
- Biggest home win: Thornton Hibs 7–0 Fauldhouse United; (21 September 2019)
- Biggest away win: Armadale Thistle 0–6 Thornton Hibs; (14 September 2019)
- Highest scoring: Pumpherston 4–6 Thornton Hibs; (17 August 2019)
- Longest winning run: 6 games: Armadale Thistle
- Longest unbeaten run: 7 games: Fauldhouse United
- Longest winless run: 10 games: Harthill Royal
- Longest losing run: 9 games: Harthill Royal & Kennoway Star Hearts
- All statistics correct as of 7 March 2020.

=== Stadia and locations ===
Club	Location	Home Ground	Capacity	Seats	Floodlit	Finishing position 2018–19
Armadale Thistle	Armadale	Volunteer Park	3,000	0	Yes	3rd in Premier League South
Bathgate Thistle	Bathgate	Creamery Park	3,000	0	Yes	4th in Premier League South
Fauldhouse United	Fauldhouse	Park View	2,000	100	No	10th
Harthill Royal	Harthill	Gibbshill Park	1,800	0	No	6th in Premier League South
Kennoway Star Hearts	Star	Treaton Park	1,000	0	Yes	8th
Livingston United	Livingston	Station Park	2,000	0	Yes	2nd in Premier League South
Lochore Welfare	Crosshill	Central Park	1,300	0	No	5th in Premier League South
Pumpherston	Pumpherston	Recreation Park	2,700	0	No	1st in Premier League South
Thornton Hibs	Thornton	Memorial Park	1,800	0	No	3rd
Whitburn	Whitburn	Central Park	3,000	38	No	4th

=== League table ===
Pos	Team	Pld	W	D	L	GF	GA	GD	Pts	Qualification or relegation
1	Livingston United	20	11	3	6	44	27	+17	36	
2	Pumpherston	18	11	2	5	45	32	+13	35	
3	Whitburn Juniors	19	10	2	7	51	41	+10	32	
4	Thornton Hibs	16	9	4	3	47	26	+21	31	Resigned membership, joined East of Scotland League
5	Armadale Thistle	17	10	1	6	42	28	+14	31	
6	Fauldhouse United	16	9	3	4	33	28	+5	30	
7	Bathgate Thistle	14	5	2	7	29	25	+4	17	
8	Harthill Royal	17	4	2	11	18	43	−25	14	
9	Kennoway Star Hearts	19	4	1	14	32	56	−24	13	Resigned membership, joined East of Scotland League
10	Lochore Welfare	16	2	2	12	17	52	−35	8	Resigned membership, joined East of Scotland League

Source: SJFA
Rules for classification: 1) Points; 2) Goal difference; 3) Goals scored

=== Results ===
==== Double round-robin ====
Home \ Away	ARM	BAT	FAU	HAR	KSH	LIV	LOW	PUM	THO	WHI
Armadale Thistle		1–3	2–0	4–0	6–1	2–1	6–1	2–3	0–6	1–3
Bathgate Thistle				0–2		3–1	4–0	4–2	6–2	1–2
Fauldhouse United	4–1	4–1		3–1	5–3	1–4		4–4	2–2	
Harthill Royal	0–5	1–0	1–1		3–6	0–2		0–4	2–2	2–1
Kennoway Star Hearts	1–3	2–2	0–1	4–0		1–4	0–3	1–0	1–2	1–5
Livingston United	1–1		0–1	2–0	3–2		3–0	1–1	3–2	5–1
Lochore Welfare	0–1	2–1	0–2		0–4	1–6		3–6		4–4
Pumpherston	3–1	2–1	2–0	1–0	3–2	1–0	2–1		4–6	3–4
Thornton Hibs			7–0	3–2		2–3	0–0			3–2
Whitburn Juniors		2–2	0–3	4–1	7–2	2–3	4–1	2–1	0–4	

Source: SJFA
Legend: Blue = home team win; Yellow = draw; Red = away team win.

==== Single round-robin ====
Home \ Away	ARM	BAT	FAU	HAR	KSH	LIV	LOW	PUM	THO	WHI
Armadale Thistle		2–1								
Bathgate Thistle										
Fauldhouse United										
Harthill Royal						3–1				
Kennoway Star Hearts	0–4							0–3	1–2	
Livingston United										
Lochore Welfare										
Pumpherston										
Thornton Hibs						0–0	4–0			
Whitburn Juniors			0–2			3–1	5–1			

Source: SJFA
Legend: Blue = home team win; Yellow = draw; Red = away team win.

== Championship play-off ==
A two legged play-off was scheduled to take place at the end of the season to determine the overall East Region champions.
