= Greenrigg =

Coordinates: 55.861°N 3.735°W

Greenrigg: Scottish Gaelic: An Druim Uaine
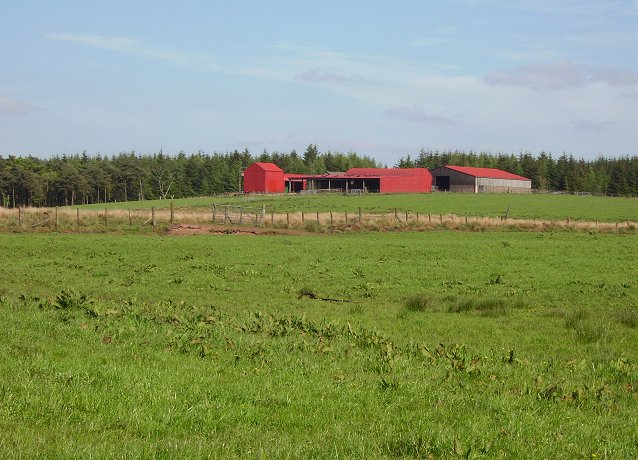
- Greenrigg Farm

- Location within West Lothian
- OS grid reference: NS914644
- Council area: West Lothian
- Lieutenancy area: West Lothian
- Country: Scotland
- Sovereign state: United Kingdom
- Post town: SHOTTS
- Postcode district: ML7
- Dialling code: 01501
- Police: Scotland
- Fire: Scottish
- Ambulance: Scottish
- UK Parliament: Bathgate and Linlithgow
- Scottish Parliament: Linlithgow

Greenrigg is a hamlet that lies in the west of West Lothian, Scotland.

Greenrigg is within walking distance to shops in the bordering village of Harthill and is quick drive away from Whitburn. The village has a school, Greenrigg Primary School, and a convenience store located in the centre on Stanley Road, a short distance from the site of the previous store, which burned down in 2006 as a result of a fireworks accident.

Greenrigg was once a thriving mining village and produced large amounts of coal. The remains of the mine can be seen in the form of a large mound of debris from the mine excavations or "bing" as they are called locally. The bing is now largely covered with wild flowers and grass, and serves as a barrier between the village's football pitch and the nearby M8 motorway.

Adjacent to the east of Greenrigg lies Polkemmet Country Park, opened in 1981, which has a driving range and 9-hole golf course, and is also home to the Scottish Owl Centre, which features the largest collection of owls in the world.

Iain J. Grant, the Canadian broadcaster, now with CFRB radio in Toronto, grew up in Greenrigg in the early 1970s before emigrating to Canada.

== Buildings and Amenities ==
Greenrigg Convenience store
Greenrigg Primary School and Community Centre.
Children's play area with swings.
Football park
Gibshill Football park and facilities (Home of Harthill Royal F.C.)
Bus stop, main road, east and west bound connecting West Lothian and North Lanarkshire destinations.
