= 2019–20 in Scottish football =

Football in Scotland
- Season: 2019–20

2019–20 in Scottish football

Premiership champions
- Celtic

Championship champions
- Dundee United

League 1 champions
- Raith Rovers

League 2 champions
- Cove Rangers

Scottish Cup winners
- Celtic

League Cup winners
- Celtic

Challenge Cup winners
- Inverness Caledonian Thistle and Raith Rovers (shared)

Teams in Europe
- Celtic, Rangers, Kilmarnock, Aberdeen

Scotland national team
- UEFA Euro 2020 qualifying

The 2019–20 season was the 123rd season of competitive football in Scotland. The domestic season began on 12 July 2019, with the first round of matches in the 2019–20 Scottish League Cup. The 2019–20 Scottish Professional Football League season started on 2 August 2019.

All competitive matches affiliated with the Scottish Football Association were postponed indefinitely on 13 March 2020, due to the COVID-19 pandemic.

== Transfer deals ==
Celtic transfer defender Kieran Tierney to Arsenal for £25 million, a record fee for both a player sold by a Scottish club and for a deal involving a Scottish player.

== League competitions ==
On 15 April 2020, all divisions in the SPFL below the Scottish Premiership were concluded, and all play-off matches were cancelled, as clubs chose to curtail the season due to the pandemic. On 18 May, the Premiership was curtailed and Celtic declared champions. Final league standings across the four SPFL leagues were determined by the average number of points per game.

Other leagues in Scotland were decided on a points per games basis, or declared null and void.

=== Scottish Premiership ===
Pos	Team	Pld	W	D	L	GF	GA	GD	Pts	PPG	Qualification or relegation (Note: All play-off matches were cancelled, as clubs voted to curtail the season due to the COVID-19 pandemic.)
1	Celtic (C)	30	26	2	2	89	19	+70	80	2.67	Qualification for the Champions League first qualifying round
2	Rangers	29	21	4	4	64	19	+45	67	2.31	Qualification for the Europa League second qualifying round (Note: Since the 2019–20 Scottish Cup was postponed and could not be completed by the UEFA registration deadline of 3 August 2020, the spot awarded to the Scottish Cup winners (Europa League second qualifying round) was passed to the second-placed team, while the fourth-placed team also qualified for European competition.)
3	Motherwell	30	14	4	12	41	38	+3	46	1.53	Qualification for the Europa League first qualifying round
4	Aberdeen	30	12	9	9	40	36	+4	45	1.50	Qualification for the Europa League first qualifying round
5	Livingston	30	10	9	11	41	39	+2	39	1.30	
6	St Johnstone	29	8	12	9	28	46	−18	36	1.24	
7	Hibernian	30	9	10	11	42	49	−7	37	1.23	
8	Kilmarnock	30	9	6	15	31	41	−10	33	1.10	
9	St Mirren	30	7	8	15	24	41	−17	29	0.97	
10	Ross County	30	7	8	15	29	60	−31	29	0.97	
11	Hamilton Academical	30	6	9	15	30	50	−20	27	0.90	
12	Heart of Midlothian (R)	30	4	11	15	31	52	−21	23	0.77	Relegation to the Championship

Source: BBC SPFL
Rules for classification: 1) Points per game; 2) Goal difference; 3) Goals scored; 4) Head-to-head points; 5) Head-to-Head goal difference; 6) Play-off (only if deciding champion, UEFA competitions qualification, second stage group allocation or relegation).
(C) Champions; (R) Relegated

=== Scottish Championship ===
Pos	Team	Pld	W	D	L	GF	GA	GD	Pts	PPG	Promotion, qualification or relegation (Note: All play-off matches were cancelled, as clubs voted to curtail the season due to the COVID-19 pandemic in Scotland.)
1	Dundee United (C, P)	28	18	5	5	52	22	+30	59	2.11	Promotion to the Premiership
2	Inverness Caledonian Thistle	27	14	3	10	39	32	+7	45	1.67	
3	Dundee	27	11	8	8	32	31	+1	41	1.52	
4	Ayr United	27	12	4	11	38	35	+3	40	1.48	
5	Arbroath	26	10	6	10	24	26	−2	36	1.38	
6	Dunfermline Athletic	28	10	7	11	41	36	+5	37	1.32	
7	Greenock Morton	28	10	6	12	45	52	−7	36	1.29	
8	Alloa Athletic	28	7	10	11	33	43	−10	31	1.11	
9	Queen of the South	28	7	7	14	28	40	−12	28	1.00	
10	Partick Thistle (R)	27	6	8	13	32	47	−15	26	0.96	Relegation to League One

Source: SPFL
Rules for classification: 1) Points per game.
(C) Champions; (P) Promoted; (R) Relegated

=== Scottish League One ===
Pos	Team	Pld	W	D	L	GF	GA	GD	Pts	PPG	Promotion, qualification or relegation (Note: All play-off matches were cancelled, as clubs voted to curtail the season due to the COVID-19 pandemic.)
1	Raith Rovers (C, P)	28	15	8	5	49	33	+16	53	1.89	Promotion to the Championship
2	Falkirk	28	14	10	4	54	18	+36	52	1.86	
3	Airdrieonians	28	14	6	8	38	27	+11	48	1.71	
4	Montrose	28	15	2	11	48	38	+10	47	1.68	
5	East Fife	28	12	9	7	44	36	+8	45	1.61	
6	Dumbarton	28	11	5	12	35	44	−9	38	1.36	
7	Clyde	28	9	7	12	35	43	−8	34	1.21	
8	Peterhead	27	7	5	15	30	44	−14	26	0.96	
9	Forfar Athletic	28	6	6	16	26	47	−21	24	0.86	
10	Stranraer (R)	27	2	10	15	28	57	−29	16	0.59	Relegation to League Two

Source: SPFL
Rules for classification: 1) Points per game.
(C) Champions; (P) Promoted; (R) Relegated

=== Scottish League Two ===
Pos	Team	Pld	W	D	L	GF	GA	GD	Pts	PPG	Promotion (Note: All play-off matches were cancelled, as clubs voted to curtail the season due to the COVID-19 pandemic.)
1	Cove Rangers (C, P)	28	22	2	4	76	34	+42	68	2.43	Promotion to League One
2	Edinburgh City	27	17	4	6	49	28	+21	55	2.04	
3	Elgin City	28	12	7	9	48	34	+14	43	1.54	
4	Cowdenbeath	27	12	5	10	37	35	+2	41	1.52	
5	Queen's Park	28	11	7	10	37	35	+2	40	1.43	
6	Stirling Albion	28	10	6	12	34	35	−1	36	1.29	
7	Annan Athletic	27	9	4	14	33	54	−21	31	1.15	
8	Stenhousemuir	28	7	8	13	32	48	−16	29	1.04	
9	Albion Rovers	26	6	6	14	37	51	−14	24	0.92	
10	Brechin City	27	4	5	18	31	60	−29	17	0.63	

Source: SPFL
Rules for classification: 1) Points per game.
(C) Champions; (P) Promoted

=== Non-league football ===
==== Level 5 ====
Highland Football League
Pos	Team	Pld	Pts	PPG
1	Brora Rangers (C)	26	72	2.77
2	Fraserburgh	23	55	2.39
3	Rothes	23	53	2.30
4	Buckie Thistle	24	53	2.21
5	Inverurie Loco Works	28	59	2.11
6	Formartine United	23	44	1.91
7	Nairn County	22	39	1.77
8	Forres Mechanics	27	43	1.59
9	Wick Academy	25	32	1.28
10	Keith	27	34	1.26
11	Deveronvale	27	31	1.15
12	Huntly	27	24	0.89
13	Strathspey Thistle	22	19	0.86
14	Turriff United	27	18	0.67
15	Clachnacuddin	27	16	0.59
16	Fort William	20	10	0.50
17	Lossiemouth	28	13	0.46

Source: Highland Football League BBC Sport Soccerway
(C) Champions

Lowland Football League
Pos	Team	Pld	Pts	PPG
1	Kelty Hearts (C)	25	68	2.72
2	Bonnyrigg Rose Athletic	24	62	2.58
3	BSC Glasgow	22	51	2.32
4	East Stirlingshire	26	53	2.04
5	The Spartans	25	49	1.96
6	Civil Service Strollers	23	39	1.70
7	East Kilbride	23	37	1.61
8	Caledonian Braves	26	36	1.38
9	Cumbernauld Colts	27	36	1.33
10	University of Stirling	25	31	1.24
11	Gala Fairydean Rovers	25	27	1.08
12	Berwick Rangers	24	24	1.00
13	Gretna 2008	24	12	0.50
14	Edinburgh University	25	12	0.48
15	Dalbeattie Star	23	11	0.48
16	Vale of Leithen	23	8	0.35

Source: SLFL BBC Sport Soccerway
(C) Champions

==== Level 6 ====
East of Scotland Football League Premier Division
Pos	Team	Pld	Pts	PPG
1	Bo'ness United (C, P)	21	47	2.24
2	Hill of Beath Hawthorn	18	37	2.06
3	Broxburn Athletic	19	38	2.00
4	Tranent Juniors	20	34	1.70
5	Camelon Juniors	20	34	1.70
6	Jeanfield Swifts	16	26	1.63
7	Dundonald Bluebell	18	27	1.50
8	Penicuik Athletic	18	27	1.50
9	Linlithgow Rose	17	24	1.41
10	Musselburgh Athletic	21	27	1.29
11	Dunbar United	21	23	1.10
12	Crossgates Primrose	21	23	1.10
13	Sauchie Juniors	22	20	0.91
14	Blackburn United	20	18	0.90
15	Whitehill Welfare	18	16	0.89
16	Newtongrange Star	22	15	0.68

Source: East of Scotland Football League
(C) Champions;
(P) Promoted

South of Scotland Football League
Pos	Team	Pld	Pts
1	Threave Rovers	20	53
2	Stranraer reserves	16	43
3	Abbey Vale	17	41
4	Bonnyton Thistle	20	40
5	Mid-Annandale	23	40
6	Newton Stewart	22	34
7	Nithsdale Wanderers	18	25
8	Heston Rovers	22	25
9	St Cuthbert Wanderers	23	23
10	Caledonian Braves reserves	19	21
11	Lochar Thistle	22	19
12	Upper Annandale	18	18
13	Wigtown & Bladnoch	22	16
14	Lochmaben	21	15
15	Creetown	17	13
16	Dumfries YMCA	0	0

Source: South of Scotland Football League

== Honours ==
=== Cup honours ===
Competition	Winner	Score	Runner-up	Match report
2019–20 Scottish Cup	Celtic	3–3 (a.e.t.) (4–3 pens.)	Heart of Midlothian	BBC Sport
2019–20 League Cup	Celtic	1–0	Rangers	BBC Sport
2019–20 Challenge Cup	Inverness CT and Raith Rovers (trophy shared); Final cancelled.			
2019–20 Youth Cup	Competition unfinished. Final never played. (Killie v Aberdeen).			
2019–20 Junior Cup	Competition scrapped Cancelled at the semi-final stage.			
2019–20 South Challenge Cup	Dunipace	3–1	Broomhill	
2019–20 Amateur Cup	Tollcross Thistle	4–4 (a.e.t.) (3–2 pens.)	Drumchapel Amateurs	Edinburgh News

=== Non-league honours ===
==== Senior ====
Level	Competition	Winner
5	Highland League	Brora Rangers
5	Lowland League	Kelty Hearts
6	East of Scotland League Premier Division	Bo'ness United
6	South of Scotland League	Null and void
7	East of Scotland League First Division	Conference A: Lothian Thistle Hutchison Vale; Conference B: Tynecastle

==== Junior ====
West Region

Division	Winner
West Premiership	Auchinleck Talbot (Note: Season suspended in March 2020. Champions were calculated using 'points per game' algorithm with a 'margin for error', announced on 21 April which would recognise the club which 'would have likely gone on to win their respective league titles'.)
West Championship	Blantyre Victoria / Darvel (joint winners)
West League One	Shettleston
West League Two	Johnstone Burgh

East Region

Division	Winner
East Super League North	Null and void
East Super League South	Null and void
East Premier League North	Null and void
East Premier League South	Null and void

North Region

Division	Winner
North Superleague	Null and void
North First Division	Null and void
North Second Division	Null and void

=== Individual honours ===
==== PFA Scotland awards ====
Due to the COVID-19 pandemic, PFA Scotland cancelled their awards for the 2019–20 season.

==== SFWA awards ====
Award	Winner	Team
Footballer of the Year	Odsonne Edouard	Celtic
Young Player of the Year	Lewis Ferguson	Aberdeen
Manager of the Year	Neil Lennon	Celtic
International Player of the Year	John McGinn	Aston Villa

== Scottish clubs in Europe ==
=== Summary ===
Club	Competitions	Started round	Final round	Coef.
Celtic	UEFA Champions League	First qualifying round	Third qualifying round	16.5
Celtic	UEFA Europa League	Play-off round	Round of 32	16.5
Rangers	UEFA Europa League	First qualifying round	Round of 16	18.0
Aberdeen	UEFA Europa League	First qualifying round	Third qualifying round	3.5
Kilmarnock	UEFA Europa League	First qualifying round		1.0
Total				39.0
Average				9.750

=== Celtic ===
UEFA Champions League

9 July 2019 QR1	Sarajevo (Bosnia and Herzegovina)	1–3	(Scotland) Celtic	Sarajevo
	Oremuš 29'	BBC Sport	Johnston 35'; Edouard 51'; Sinclair 85'	Stadium: Koševo City Stadium; Referee: Glenn Nyberg (Sweden)

17 July 2019 QR1	Celtic (Scotland)	2–1 (5–2 agg.)	(Bosnia and Herzegovina) Sarajevo	Glasgow
	Christie 26'; McGregor 76'	BBC Sport	Tatar 63'	Stadium: Celtic Park; Attendance: 58,662; Referee: Alain Durieux (Luxembourg)

24 July 2019 QR2	Celtic (Scotland)	5–0	(Estonia) Nõmme Kalju	Glasgow
	Ajer 36'; Christie 44' (pen.), 65'; Griffiths 45+3'; McGregor 77'	BBC Sport		Stadium: Celtic Park; Referee: Jakob Kehlet (Denmark)

30 July 2019 QR2	Nõmme Kalju (Estonia)	0–2 (0–7 agg.)	(Scotland) Celtic	Tallinn
		BBC Sport	Kulinits 10' (o.g.); Shved 90+3'	Stadium: A Le Coq Arena; Referee: Benoît Millot (France)

7 August 2019 QR3	CFR Cluj (Romania)	1–1	(Scotland) Celtic	Cluj-Napoca
	Rondon 28'	BBC Sport	Forrest 37'	Stadium: Stadionul Dr. Constantin Rădulescu; Referee: Srđan Jovanović (Serbia)

13 August 2019 QR3	Celtic (Scotland)	3–4 (4–5 agg.)	(Romania) CFR Cluj	Glasgow
	Forrest 51'; Edouard 61'; Christie 76'	BBC Sport	Deac 27'; Omrani 74' (pen.), 80'; Tucudean 90+8'	Stadium: Celtic Park; Referee: Andris Treimanis (Latvia)

UEFA Europa League

Having lost in Champions League qualifying to CFR Cluj, Celtic dropped into the Europa League playoff round.

22 August 2019 PO	Celtic (Scotland)	2–0	(Sweden) AIK	Glasgow
	Forrest 48'; Edouard 73'	BBC Sport		Stadium: Celtic Park; Referee: Tamás Bognár (Hungary)

29 August 2019 PO	AIK (Sweden)	1–4 (1–6 agg.)	(Scotland) Celtic	Stockholm
	Larsson 33' (pen.)	BBC Sport	Forrest 17'; Linnér 34' (o.g.); Jullien 87'; Morgan 90+3'	Stadium: Friends Arena; Referee: Nikola Dabanović (Montenegro)

Group Stage

Pos	Team	Pld	W	D	L	GF	GA	GD	Pts	Qualification	CEL	CLJ	LAZ	REN
1	(Scotland) Celtic	6	4	1	1	10	6	+4	13	Advance to knockout phase	—	2–0	2–1	3–1
2	(Romania) CFR Cluj	6	4	0	2	6	4	+2	12	Advance to knockout phase	2–0	—	2–1	1–0
3	(Italy) Lazio	6	2	0	4	6	9	−3	6		1–2	1–0	—	2–1
4	(France) Rennes	6	1	1	4	5	8	−3	4		1–1	0–1	2–0	—

Source: UEFA
Rules for classification: Group stage tiebreakers

19 September 2019 Group E	Rennes (France)	1–1	(Scotland) Celtic	Rennes
	Niang 37' (pen.)	BBC Sport	Christie 59' (pen.)	Stadium: Roazhon Park; Referee: José María Sánchez Martínez (Spain)

3 October 2019 Group E	Celtic (Scotland)	2–0	(Romania) CFR Cluj	Glasgow
	Edouard 20'; Elyounoussi 59'	BBC Sport		Stadium: Celtic Park; Referee: Daniel Siebert (Germany)

24 October 2019 Group E	Celtic (Scotland)	2–1	(Italy) Lazio	Glasgow
	Christie 67'; Jullien 89'	BBC Sport	Lazzari 40'	Stadium: Celtic Park; Referee: Ivan Bebek (Croatia)

7 November 2019 Group E	Lazio (Italy)	1–2	(Scotland) Celtic	Rome
	Immobile 7'	BBC Sport	Forrest 38'; Ntcham 90+5'	Stadium: Stadio Olimpico; Referee: Tobias Stieler (Germany)

28 November 2019 Group E	Celtic (Scotland)	3–1	(France) Rennes	Glasgow
	Morgan 21'; Christie 45+1'; Johnston 74'	BBC Sport	Hunou 89'	Stadium: Celtic Park; Referee: Espen Eskås (Norway)

12 December 2019 Group E	CFR Cluj (Romania)	2–0	(Scotland) Celtic	Cluj-Napoca
	Burca 48'; Djokovic 70'	BBC Sport		Stadium: Stadionul Dr. Constantin Rădulescu; Attendance: 12,890; Referee: Halis Özkahya

Knockout Stage

20 February 2020 Last 32	Copenhagen (Denmark)	1–1	(Scotland) Celtic	Copenhagen
	N'Doye 52'	BBC Sport	Edouard 14'	Stadium: Parken Stadium; Referee: Sergey Karasev (Russia)

27 February 2020 Last 32	Celtic (Scotland)	1–3 (2–4 agg.)	(Denmark) Copenhagen	Glasgow
	Edouard 83' (pen.)	BBC Sport	Santos 51'; Biel 85'; N'Doye 88'	Stadium: Celtic Park; Referee: Artur Manuel Soares Dias (Portugal)

=== Rangers ===
UEFA Europa League

9 July 2019 QR1	St Joseph's (Gibraltar)	0–4	(Scotland) Rangers	Gibraltar
		BBC Sport	Jack 50'; Ojo 56'; Goldson 68'; Morelos 77'	Stadium: Victoria Stadium; Referee: Nejc Kajtazovic (Slovenia)

18 July 2019 QR1	Rangers (Scotland)	6–0 (10–0 agg.)	(Gibraltar) St Joseph's	Glasgow
	Aribo 3'; Morelos 45+1', 57' (pen.), 66'; Defoe 77', 86'	BBC Sport		Stadium: Ibrox Stadium; Attendance: 45,718; Referee: Christopher Jäger (Austria)

25 July 2019 QR2	Rangers (Scotland)	2–0	(Luxembourg) Progrès Niederkorn	Glasgow
	Aribo 20'; Ojo 54'	BBC Sport		Stadium: Ibrox Stadium; Referee: Espen Eskas (Norway)

1 August 2019 QR2	Progrès Niederkorn (Luxembourg)	0–0 (0–2 agg.)	(Scotland) Rangers	Luxembourg
		BBC Sport		Stadium: Stade Josy Barthel; Referee: Ivaylo Stoyanov (Bulgaria)

8 August 2019 QR3	FC Midtjylland (Denmark)	2–4	(Scotland) Rangers	Herning
	Onyeka 58'; Kaba 63'	BBC Sport	Morelos 43'; Aribo 52'; Katić 56'; Arfield 70'	Stadium: MCH Arena; Referee: Kristo Tohver (Estonia)

15 August 2019 QR3	Rangers (Scotland)	3–1 (7–3 agg.)	(Denmark) FC Midtjylland	Glasgow
	Morelos 14', 49'; Ojo 39'	BBC Sport	Evander 72'	Stadium: Ibrox Stadium; Referee: Marco Di Bello (Italy)

22 August 2019 PO	Legia Warsaw (Poland)	0–0	(Scotland) Rangers	Warsaw
		BBC Sport		Stadium: Polish Army Stadium; Referee: Benoît Bastien (France)

29 August 2019 PO	Rangers (Scotland)	1–0 (1–0 agg.)	(Poland) Legia Warsaw	Glasgow
	Morelos 90+1'	BBC Sport		Stadium: Ibrox Stadium; Referee: Slavko Vinčić (Slovenia)

Group Stage

Pos	Team	Pld	W	D	L	GF	GA	GD	Pts	Qualification	POR	RAN	YB	FEY
1	(Portugal) Porto	6	3	1	2	8	9	−1	10	Advance to knockout phase	—	1–1	2–1	3–2
2	(Scotland) Rangers	6	2	3	1	8	6	+2	9	Advance to knockout phase	2–0	—	1–1	1–0
3	(Switzerland) Young Boys	6	2	2	2	8	7	+1	8		1–2	2–1	—	2–0
4	(Netherlands) Feyenoord	6	1	2	3	7	9	−2	5		2–0	2–2	1–1	—

Source: UEFA
Rules for classification: Group stage tiebreakers

19 September 2019 Group G	Rangers (Scotland)	1–0	(Netherlands) Feyenoord	Glasgow
	Ojo 24'	BBC Sport		Stadium: Ibrox Stadium; Referee: Antonio Miguel Mateu Lahoz (Spain)

3 October 2019 Group G	Young Boys (Switzerland)	2–1	(Scotland) Rangers	Bern
	Assale 50'; Fassnacht 90+3'	BBC Sport	Morelos 44'	Stadium: Stade de Suisse; Referee: Manuel Schüttengruber

24 October 2019 Group G	Porto (Portugal)	1–1	(Scotland) Rangers	Porto
	Díaz 36'	BBC Sport	Morelos 44'	Stadium: Estadio Dragao; Referee: Nikola Dabanović

7 November 2019 Group G	Rangers (Scotland)	2–0	(Portugal) Porto	Glasgow
	Morelos 69'; Davis 73'	BBC Sport		Stadium: Ibrox Stadium; Referee: Davide Massa

28 November 2019 Group G	Feyenoord (Netherlands)	2–2	(Scotland) Rangers	Rotterdam
	Toornstra 33'; Sinisterra 68'	BBC Sport	Morelos 52', 65'	Stadium: De Kuip; Referee: Damir Skomina (Slovenia)

12 December 2019 Group G	Rangers (Scotland)	1–1	(Switzerland) Young Boys	Glasgow
	Morelos 30'	BBC Sport	Barisic 89' (o.g.)	Stadium: Ibrox Stadium; Attendance: 49,015; Referee: Felix Brych (Germany)

Knockout Stage

20 February 2020 Last 32	Rangers (Scotland)	3–2	(Portugal) Braga	Glasgow
	Hagi 67', 82'; Aribo 75'	BBC Sport	Fransérgio 11'; Ruiz 59'	Stadium: Ibrox Stadium; Referee: Xavier Estrada Fernández (Spain)

27 February 2020 Last 32	Braga (Portugal)	0–1 (2–4 agg.)	(Scotland) Rangers	Braga
		BBC Sport	Kent 61'	Stadium: Estádio Municipal; Referee: Andreas Ekberg (Sweden)

12 March 2020 Last 16	Rangers (Scotland)	1–3	(Germany) Bayer Leverkusen	Glasgow
	Edmundson 75'	BBC Sport	Havertz 37' (pen.); Aránguiz 67'; Bailey 88'	Stadium: Ibrox Stadium; Referee: Szymon Marciniak (Poland)

6 August 2020 Last 16	Bayer Leverkusen (Germany)	1–0 (4–1 agg.)	(Scotland) Rangers	Leverkusen
	Diaby 51'	BBC Sport		Stadium: BayArena; Referee: Danny Makkelie (Netherlands)

=== Kilmarnock ===
UEFA Europa League

11 July 2019 QR1	Connah's Quay Nomads (Wales)	1–2	(Scotland) Kilmarnock	Rhyl
	Taylor 75' (o.g.)	BBC Sport	Brophy 82' (pen.); Findlay 90+2'	Stadium: Belle Vue; Referee: Erik Lambrechts (Belgium)

18 July 2019 QR1	Kilmarnock (Scotland)	0–2 (2–3 agg.)	(Wales) Connah's Quay Nomads	Kilmarnock
		BBC Sport	Morris 50', 80' (pen.)	Stadium: Rugby Park; Referee: Ferenc Karakó (Hungary)

=== Aberdeen ===
UEFA Europa League

11 July 2019 QR1	Aberdeen (Scotland)	2–1	(Finland) RoPS	Aberdeen
	McGinn 36'; Cosgrove 48'	BBC Sport	Jäntti 90+3'	Stadium: Pittodrie Stadium; Referee: Kaspar Sjöberg (Sweden)

18 July 2019 QR1	RoPS (Finland)	1–2 (2–4 agg.)	(Scotland) Aberdeen	Rovaniemi
	Kada 2'	BBC Sport	Cosgrove 27' (pen.); Ferguson 90+4'	Stadium: Keskuskenttä; Referee: Umit Ozturk (Turkey)

25 July 2019 QR2	Chikhura Sachkhere (Georgia (country))	1–1	(Scotland) Aberdeen	Tbilisi
	Koripadze 41' (pen.)	BBC Sport	Cosgrove 68' (pen.)	Stadium: Boris Paichadze Dinamo Arena; Referee: Horatiu Fesnic (Romania)

1 August 2019 QR2	Aberdeen (Scotland)	5–0 (6–1 agg.)	(Georgia (country)) Chikhura Sachkhere	Aberdeen
	Cosgrove 9', 20', 80'; Leigh 58'; Wright 64'	BBC Sport		Stadium: Pittodrie Stadium; Referee: Rade Obrenovic (Slovenia)

8 August 2019 QR3	Rijeka (Croatia)	2–0	(Scotland) Aberdeen	Rijeka
	Čolak 62' (pen.); Murić 87'	BBC Sport		Stadium: Stadion Rujevica; Referee: Ricardo de Burgos Bengoetxea (Spain)

15 August 2019 QR3	Aberdeen (Scotland)	0–2 (0–4 agg.)	(Croatia) Rijeka	Aberdeen
		BBC Sport	Lončar 10'; Čolak 32'	Stadium: Pittodrie Stadium; Referee: Harald Lechner (Austria)

== Scotland national team ==
6 September 2019 Euro 2020 qualifying	Scotland	1–2	Russia	Glasgow
	McGinn 10'	BBC Sport	Dzyuba 40'; O'Donnell 59' (o.g.)	Stadium: Hampden Park; Attendance: 32,432; Referee: Anastasios Sidiropoulos (Greece)

9 September 2019 Euro 2020 qualifying	Scotland	0–4	Belgium	Glasgow
		BBC Sport	Lukaku 9'; Vermaelen 24'; Alderweireld 32' de Bruyne 82'	Stadium: Hampden Park; Attendance: 25,524; Referee: Pawel Gil (Poland)

10 October 2019 Euro 2020 qualifying	Russia	4–0	Scotland	Moscow
	Dzyuba 57', 70'; Ozdoev 60'; Golovin 84'	BBC Sport		Stadium: Luzhniki Stadium; Attendance: 55,703; Referee: Jakob Kehlet (Denmark)

13 October 2019 Euro 2020 qualifying	Scotland	6–0	San Marino	Glasgow
	McGinn 12', 27', 45+1'; Shankland 65'; Findlay 67'; Armstrong 86'	BBC Sport		Stadium: Hampden Park; Attendance: 20,699; Referee: Jérôme Brisard (France)

16 November 2019 Euro 2020 qualifying	Cyprus	1–2	Scotland	Nicosia
	Efrem 47'	BBC Sport	Christie 12'; McGinn 53'	Stadium: GSP Stadium; Referee: Harald Lechner (Austria)

19 November 2019 Euro 2020 qualifying	Scotland	3–1	Kazakhstan	Glasgow
	McGinn 48', 90+1'; Naismith 64'	BBC Sport	Zaynutdinov 34'	Stadium: Hampden Park; Referee: Bas Nijhuis (Netherlands)

== Women's football ==
Glasgow City won their 13th consecutive Scottish national title in the 2019 season, which was completed on 24 November with the Scottish Women's Cup final.

2019 was officially the last season of the SWFL First Division and SWFL Second Division, after 20 years (replaced by the SWF Championship and SWFL regional divisions).

=== League and Cup honours ===
Division	Winner
2019 SWPL 1	Glasgow City
2019 SWPL 2	Heart of Midlothian
2019 SWFL First Division (North)	Aberdeen F.C. Women
2019 SWFL First Division (South)	Glasgow City Development
2019 SWFL Second Division (North/East)	Dundee City
2019 SWFL Second Division (West/South West)	Morton
2019 SWFL Second Division (West/Central)	Bishopton
2019 SWFL Second Division (South East/Central)	Edinburgh Caledonia

Competition	Winner	Score	Runner-up	Match report
2019 Scottish Women's Cup	Glasgow City	4–3	Hibernian	BBC Sport
2019 Scottish Women's Premier League Cup	Hibernian	(p) 0–0	Glasgow City	BBC Sport
2019 SWFL First Division Cup	Celtic Academy	6–0	Renfrew	She Kicks
2019 SWFL Second Division Cup	Morton	3–2 (a.e.t.)	Dryburgh Athletic	She Kicks

=== Individual honours ===
==== SWPL awards ====
Award	Winner	Team
Players' Player of the Year		
Player of the Year		
Manager of the Year		
Young Player of the Year		

=== Scottish Women's Premier League ===
==== SWPL 1 ====
SWPL 1
Pos	Team	Pld	W	D	L	GF	GA	GD	Pts	Qualification or relegation
1	Glasgow City (C, Q)	21	20	0	1	104	11	+93	60	Qualification for the Champions League qualifying round
2	Hibernian	21	16	1	4	83	15	+68	49	
3	Celtic	21	16	1	4	64	19	+45	49	
4	Rangers	21	11	1	9	35	57	−22	34	
5	Spartans	21	6	4	11	25	42	−17	22	
6	Motherwell	21	5	4	12	24	67	−43	19	
7	Forfar Farmington	21	2	3	16	15	78	−63	9	
8	Stirling University (R)	21	0	2	19	14	75	−61	2	Relegation to SWPL 2

Updated to match(es) played on 18 November 2019. Source:
Rules for classification: 1) Points; 2) Goal difference; 3) Number of goals scored
(C) Champions; (Q) Qualified for the phase indicated; (R) Relegated

=== UEFA Women's Champions League ===
==== Glasgow City ====
Glasgow City entered the Champions League in the round of 32, and were seeded at that stage. City eliminated Russian side Chertanovo to progress to the last 16, where they defeated Danish club Brøndby after a penalty shootout. This meant that City progressed to the quarter-finals, which were originally scheduled for March 2020 but were rescheduled and reformatted due to the coronavirus pandemic.

11 September 2019 Last 32	Chertanovo (Russia)	0–1	(Scotland) Glasgow City	Moscow
20:00 MSK			Lauder 11'	Stadium: Gorodok Stadium; Referee: P. Pavlikova (Slovakia)

26 September 2019 Last 32	Glasgow City (Scotland)	4–1 (5–1 agg.)	(Russia) Chertanovo	Glasgow
19:30 BST	Lauder 7', 76'; Shine 29'; McLauchlan 67'	BBC Sport	Komissarova 3'	Stadium: Petershill Park; Referee: Marta Huerta de Aza (Spain)

16 October 2019 Last 16	Brøndby (Denmark)	0–2	(Scotland) Glasgow City	Brøndbyvester
18:00 CEST		BBC Sport	Henriksen 1' (o.g.); Abel 60' (o.g.)	Stadium: Brøndby Stadium; Referee: E. Augustyn (Poland)

31 October 2019 Last 16	Glasgow City (Scotland)	0–2 (a.e.t.) (2–2 agg.) (3–1 p)	(Denmark) Brøndby	Glasgow
19:30 GMT		BBC Sport	Christiansen 6'; Lindhardt	Stadium: Petershill Park; Referee: Sara Persson (Sweden)

21 August 2020 QF	Glasgow City (Scotland)	–	(Germany) Wolfsburg	San Sebastián
				Stadium: Anoeta Stadium

==== Hibernian ====
Hibernian entered the Champions League in the qualifying group phase. They progressed to the last 32, where they were unseeded, by winning their group.

7 August 2019 Qualifying group 3	Hibernian (Scotland)	3–0	(Georgia (country)) Tbilisi Nike	Beltinci
15:00 BST	Cavanagh 17'; Napier 68', 90+3'	BBC Sport		Stadium: Beltinci Sports Park; Referee: I. Allayiotou (Cyprus)

10 August 2019 Qualifying group 3	Hibernian (Scotland)	2–1	(Wales) Cardiff Met.	Beltinci
10:00 BST	Gallacher 20'; Murray 68'	BBC Sport	Allen 88'	Stadium: Beltinci Sports Park

13 August 2019 Qualifying group 3	Pomurje (Slovenia)	1–2	(Scotland) Hibernian	Beltinci
16:00 BST	Prsa 45' (pen.)	BBC Sport	Napier 7'; Davidson 36'	Stadium: Beltinci Sports Park; Referee: V. Tsiareshka (Belarus)

11 September 2019 Last 32	Hibernian (Scotland)	1–4	(Czech Republic) Slavia Prague	Edinburgh
19:45 BST	Hunter 3'		Kozarova 36', 40', 75'; Jarchovska 42'	Stadium: Easter Road; Referee: Marta Huerta de Aza (Spain)

25 September 2019 Last 32	Slavia Prague (Czech Republic)	5–1 (9–2 agg.)	(Scotland) Hibernian	Prague
18:30 CEST	Divišová 5'; Svitková 37', 60'; Jarchovska 69'; Szewieczková 90+1'	BBC Sport	Gallacher 20'	Stadium: Sinobo Stadium; Referee: Désirée Grundbacher (Switzerland)

=== Scotland women's national team ===
30 August 2019 Euro 2021 qualifying	Scotland	8–0	Cyprus	Edinburgh
19:35 BST	Emslie 11'; Little 20', 40', 61', 83', 89'; Ross 52'; Weir 90+1'			Stadium: Easter Road; Attendance: 6,206; Referee: Maria Sole Caputi (Italy)

8 November 2019 Euro 2021 qualifying	Albania	0–5	Scotland	Elbasan
17:10 GMT		BBC Sport	Emslie 15'; Ross 24'; Cuthbert 59'; Godfrey 64'; Murray 77'	Stadium: Elbasan Arena; Referee: Emilie Dokset (Norway)

4 March 2020 2020 Pinatar Cup	Ukraine	0–3	Scotland	San Pedro del Pinatar, Spain
18:00 GMT		BBC Sport	Thomas 23', 73'; Emslie 79'	Stadium: Pinatar Arena; Referee: Petra Pavlikova

7 March 2020 2020 Pinatar Cup	Scotland	1–0	Iceland	San Pedro del Pinatar, Spain
14:00 GMT	Grant 55'	BBC Sport		Stadium: Pinatar Arena; Referee: Zuzana Valentová

10 March 2020 2020 Pinatar Cup	Northern Ireland	1–2	Scotland	San Pedro del Pinatar, Spain
19:30 GMT	Furness 5'	BBC Sport	Cuthbert 35'; Grant 38'	Stadium: Pinatar Arena; Attendance: 300; Referee: Petra Pavlikova

== Deaths ==
- August: Jimmy Fleming, 90, Stirling Albion and Berwick Rangers full back.
- 22 August: Junior Agogo, 40, Hibernian forward.
- 4 September: Kenny Mitchell, 62, Greenock Morton defender.
- 16 September: Bobby Prentice, 65, Heart of Midlothian winger.
- 18 September: Fernando Ricksen, 43, Rangers defender.
- 23 October: John Fleming, 62, referee and SFA official.
- 11 November: Bill Barr, Ayr United chairman.
- 25 November: Martin Harvey, 78, Raith Rovers assistant manager.
- 11 December: Ian Young, 76, Celtic and St Mirren defender.
- 18 December: Tom White, 80, Raith Rovers, St Mirren, Hearts and Aberdeen forward.
- 20 December: Billy Hughes, 70, Scotland forward.
- 22 December: Duncan MacKay, 82, Celtic, Third Lanark and Scotland defender.
- 6 January: Danny Masterton, 65, Ayr United, Clyde and Queen of the South forward.
- 15 January: Bobby Brown, 96, Queen's Park, Rangers, Falkirk and Scotland goalkeeper; St Johnstone and Scotland manager.
- March: Dave Souter, 79, Dundee United, Arbroath, Berwick Rangers, East Fife, Clyde and Dundee winger and defender.
- 30 March: Alex Forsyth, 91, Albion Rovers and East Stirlingshire outside right.
- 11 April: Peter Bonetti, 78, Dundee United goalkeeper.
- 23 April: John Murphy, 77, Ayr United defender.
- April: John Freebairn, Partick Thistle and Montrose goalkeeper.
- 2 May: John Ogilvie, 91, Hibernian defender.
- 26 May: Christian Mbulu, 23, Motherwell defender.
