= Whitburn =

Whitburn may refer to:

== Places ==
- Whitburn, Alberta, Canada
- Whitburn, Tyne and Wear, England
  - Whitburn CofE Academy
  - Whitburn Colliery
- Whitburn, West Lothian, Scotland
  - Whitburn Academy

== People ==
- Denis Whitburn (born 1944), Australian film writer and producer
- Joel Whitburn (1939–2022), American music historian
- Stephen Whitburn (born 1964), American politician and former journalist
- Vanessa Whitburn (born 1951), British radio producer

== Other ==
- Whitburn Junior F.C.
