= Heart of Scotland =

Heart of Scotland may refer to:

- Heart of Scotland services
- Centre of Scotland
