= Harthill, Scotland =

Coordinates: 55°51′37″N 3°44′57″W

Harthill: Scottish Gaelic: Cnoc an Daimh
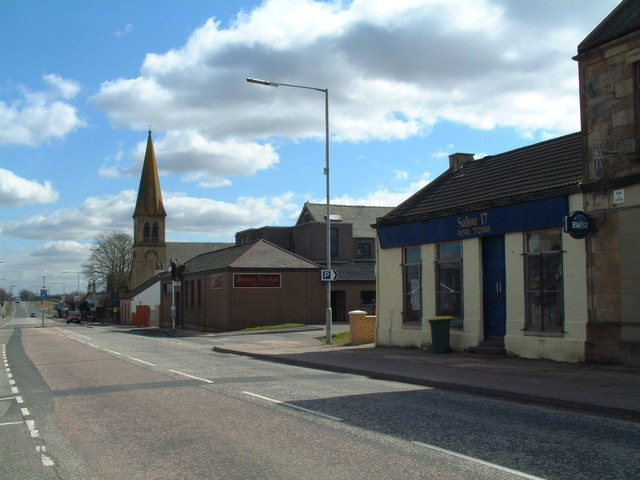
- Main Street and church in centre of Harthill village, looking east

- Location within North Lanarkshire
- Population: 2,610 (2020)
- OS grid reference: NS906643
- Civil parish: Shotts; Whitburn
- Council area: North Lanarkshire
- Lieutenancy area: Lanarkshire
- Country: Scotland
- Sovereign state: United Kingdom
- Post town: SHOTTS
- Postcode district: ML7
- Dialling code: 01501
- Police: Scotland
- Fire: Scottish
- Ambulance: Scottish
- UK Parliament: Airdrie and Shotts
- Scottish Parliament: Airdrie

Harthill is a rural village split between North Lanarkshire and West Lothian in Scotland, with most of the village in North Lanarkshire. It is located about halfway between Glasgow, 21 miles (34 kilometres) to the west, and Edinburgh, 25 miles (40 km) to the east. It lies on the River Almond about 2 1/2 miles (4 km) west of the small town of Whitburn. The closest major towns are Bathgate, 6 miles (9.7 km) away, and Livingston, 10 miles (16 km) away. Major towns within North Lanarkshire, such as Wishaw, Airdrie, Motherwell, Coatbridge and Bellshill are all around 10 to 15 miles (15 to 25 km) to the west. The M8 motorway bypasses the village as does the village's service station.

== Overview ==
Harthill grew up as a result of the coal mining industries of North Lanarkshire, and some of the original old miners' homes remain. Originally part of Linlithgowshire, it was eventually split between the ancient counties of West Lothian and Lanarkshire. The village of Greenrigg is adjacent to Harthill on its east side and lies in West Lothian. Some remaining miners' homes, otherwise known as "miners' rows", are also in Greenrigg, along with the houses on Polkemmet Road, Stanley Road and Burns Crescent. The occupants worked in nearby Greenrigg and Polkemmet Collieries, which were in West Lothian and also Blairmuckill, Dewshill, Hassockrig, and others in Lanarkshire.

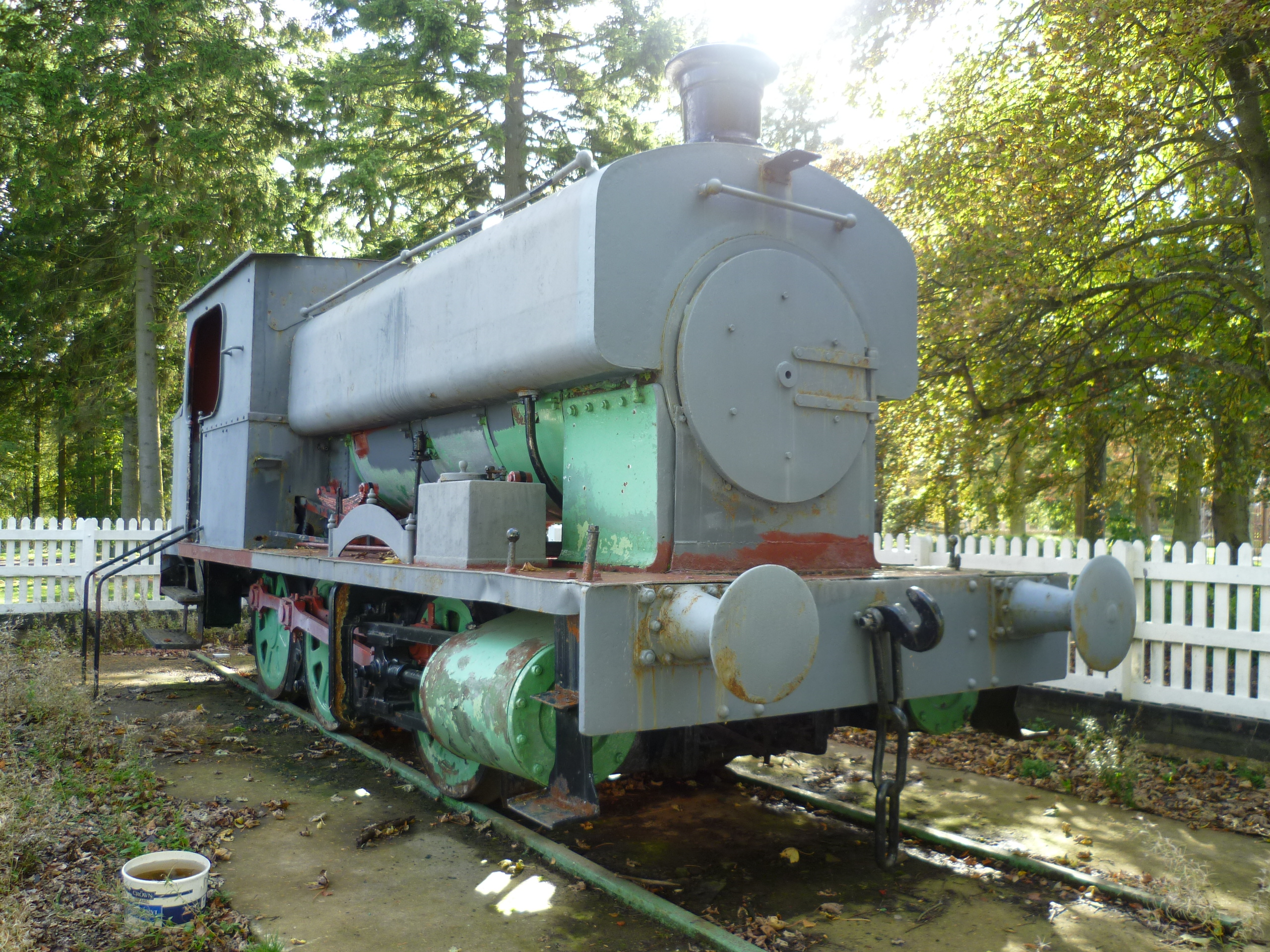
Colliery tank engine, Polkemmet Country Park

Polkemmet deep mine coal pit closed during the miners' strike in 1984 due to a mistake by the pickets, who stopped the firemen going in to keep the pumps maintained and the water at bay, which lead to an unrecoverable flooding of the pit.

The only evidence remaining of Polkemmet colliery is a few buildings on the corner of Dixon Terrace (Whitburn) and the building which is now Buildbase. If you stand facing the buildings with your back to the council tip, the windings stood to the right and the canteen was near where the bend on the road now is.

A steam engine, known as a "Pug", which was used to pull the coal wagons, is now on display in the local Polkemmet Country Park, formerly the private estate of the local land-owning Baillie dynasty.

Many other mines were dotted around the surrounding area, including the Benhar pit to the west of Harthill.

Harthill, Eastfield, and Greenrigg form something of a single village entity now, but each retains its independent close-knit identity.

Harthill is located on the A8 and M8 corridors between Scotland's two largest cities, Edinburgh and Glasgow, with the village by-passed in 1965 by the first constructed section of the M8 motorway. Scotland's first motorway service station, Heart of Scotland services, was also built at Harthill in 1971 and is located a few hundred yards north of the village. Originally leased and operated by Blue Star to serve M8 traffic, the service station incorporated a landmark motorway footbridge, and a corporate business suite which could be leased for meetings or events – being half-way between Scotland's two major cities. It was never a success as the M8 is basically a 45-mile commuter route.

The service station, known as Harthill Services, was completely redeveloped around 2006 and renamed Heart of Scotland services. A modern replacement footbridge, which was designed by Buro Happold, and cost £5 million, opened in October 2008, and completed the redevelopment. The land is still owned by Transport Scotland and the current site operator is BP.

The number 900 bus links Harthill with Edinburgh and Glasgow every 15 minutes from the Harthill service station. A park and ride system operates here for car and bike owners. Local bus connections terminate here also.

Local industries comprise food distribution and the manufacture of plastics.

Harthill is sometimes considered an isogloss, as it is around here that there is a distinct change from the West Central Scots accent spoken further into Lanarkshire to the East Central Scots spoken in West Lothian. Around 15 miles (24 km) to the north-west, Castlecary - also alongside a motorway - is perceived to be the location of a shift between dialects; as well as being on the border between local authorities.

== Origins ==
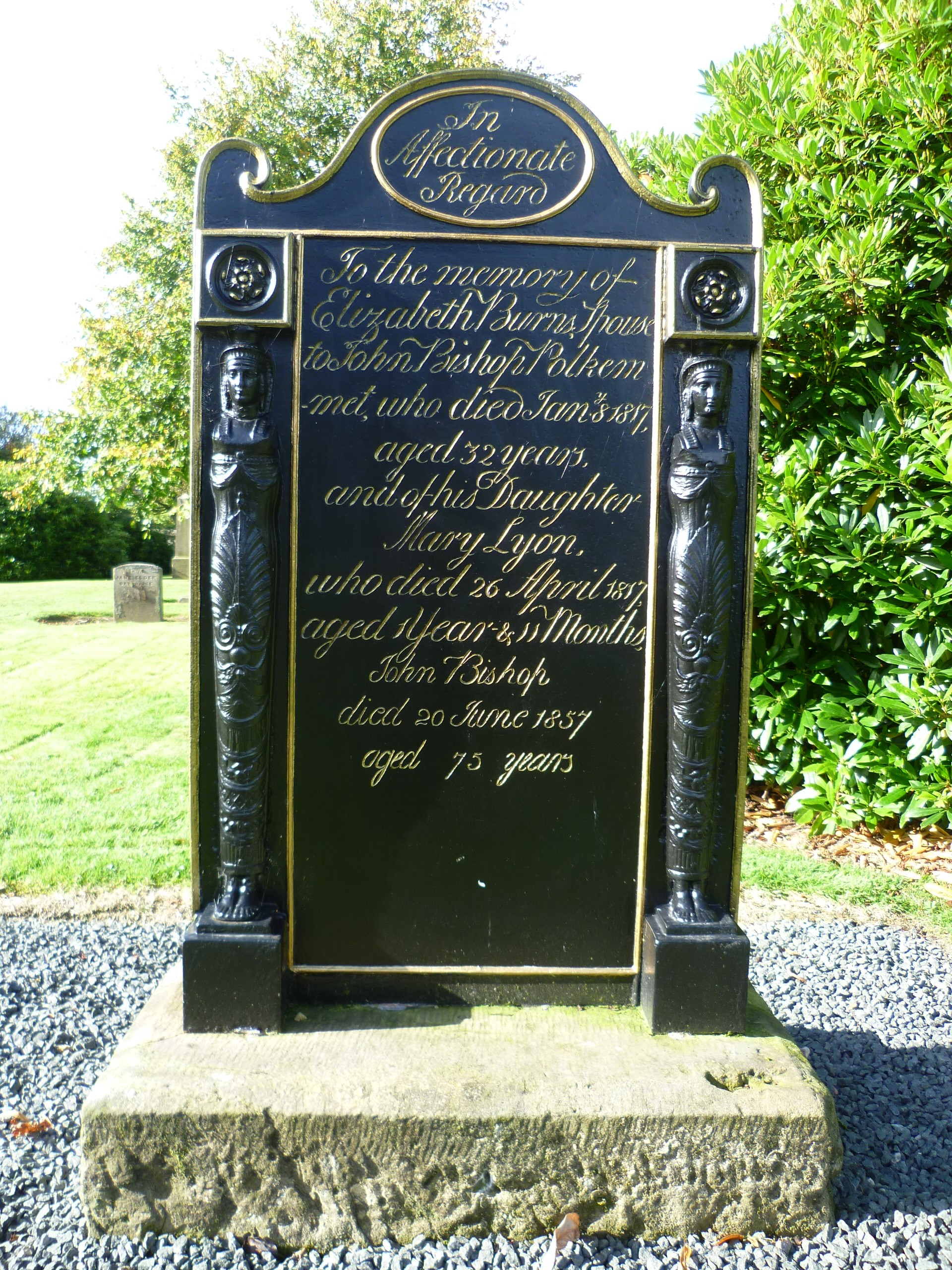
Grave of Elizabeth Burns at Whitburn

In 1767 the 'Turnpike' system was first established in Scotland with the main route between Edinburgh and Glasgow passing through Harthill. By 1780 'The Edinburgh to Glasgow Flyer' stagecoach would pass through Harthill and Whitburn up to 20 times a day. The 'Halfway House' which is now a private dwelling at Polkemmet Country park and Golf Course (on the B7066 (A8)) was where horses could be changed and watered. Travellers could take refreshments and later alcohol was licensed. Elizabeth Burns (daughter of Robert Burns) lived here at one point in the Halfway House with her husband, John Bishop, being employed as an overseer on the Polkemmet Estate, and in the nearby Whitburn churchyard there is a memorial to her.

Rev Alexander Carlyle (26 January 1722 – 28 August 1805) a former moderator of the Church of Scotland and autobiographer, wrote in 1744 of the area, that the closest buildings around Kirk o'Shotts were a single cottage in Whitburn, 'Whitburn itself was a solitary house in a desolate county' and that 'there was scarce a cottage to be seen east of Kirk o'Shotts'. He also described the whole area as bleak countryside, sparsely wooded, rough and hilly and weather harsh.

An early map of 1773 has reference to Harthill then known as 'Sidehead'. In 1795 Harthill was known as 'Sideheads' with the name having been given to a building there known as Sideheads. This building was close to where the now category B listed Viewfield house now stands on the Main Street. 1795 Parish records note a James Main of Muirhead Lands and Mathew Hanney as farmers in the area. Most people in the surrounding area at this time were farmers or farm labourers.

An entry in Reg. Prov. Coun. Vol X dated 1616 makes reference to the coal mining of John Muirhead of Braidenhill who had a going coal pit near the land of Kipp in the new Monklands Parish. This coal pit had one draught and course of water which was drawn from the pit which operated for many years until, out of grudge, Matthew Newlands of Kipp caused the water to be dammed making the pit unprofitable.

A weekly mercat (market) and two annual 'fairs' at Kirk o'Shotts had been established under a warrant by King James VII, in 1685, to James Hamilton, the 4th Duke of Hamilton. These were to be held adjoining (mal a propos) Kirk o'Shotts on the third Tuesday of June and August. The chief business done at these markets was the buying and selling of horses and cattle.

By 1882 the Harthill village was thriving with many external business links and its own commercial bank and continued to attract incomers.

== Coal ==
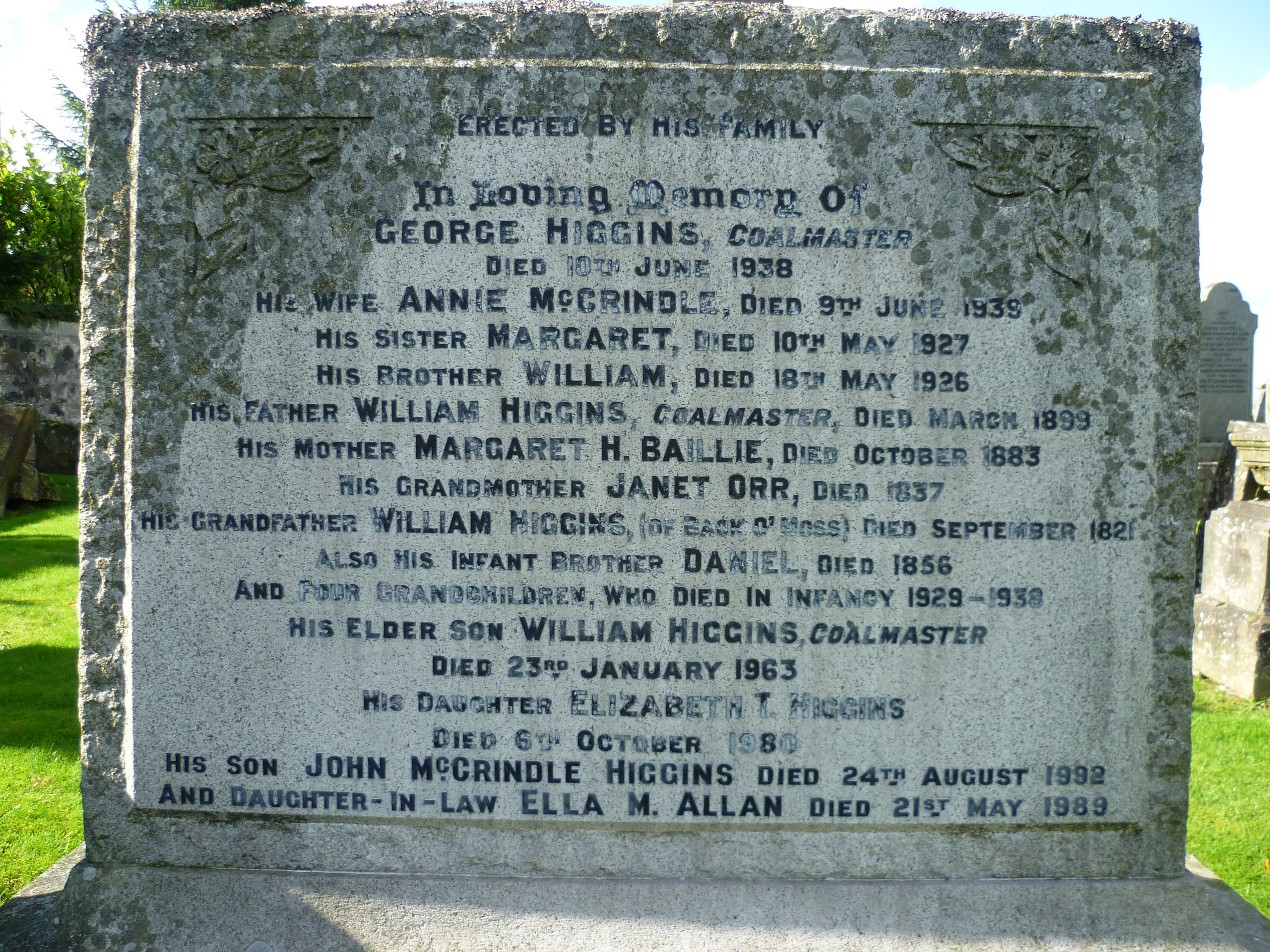
Kirk o'Shotts gravestone showing the area's close connection with coal mining

Harthill and much of Central Scotland has rich deposits of coal. Digging of coal fuelled the beginnings of development in the area. Sir John Inglis of Crammond organised the first coal pits in the area at Benhar, south-west of Harthill. Nine men were initially employed and received 13 shillings per week. These miners had tied accommodation with the job and had to pay rent to the coal pit owner. If they could no longer work due to accidents or ill health, they and their family lost their accommodation. Working conditions were very poor and dangerous.

In 1806, two miles to the east of Harthill at Greenrigg, Lord Polkemmet sank a pit which employed thirteen miners, two boys and some labourers. The seam was about 25 m (82 ft) below ground and it produced 8,000 tons of coal per year, which was sold for 6 shillings and 4d (33 new pence) per ton into Edinburgh and generated annual revenues of around £1,000 per year.

As the demand for coal continued to increase with growth from the effects of the Industrial Revolution, factories, and housing growth in Edinburgh and Glasgow, more pits began to be sunk throughout central Scotland for more coal. More people in Scotland now worked in coal pits and factories than in agriculture.

In 1830 it was normal for women and children as young as five and six to haul trucks full of coal to the surface of the coal pits. Accident records were not kept. The Mines and Collieries Act 1842 banned women and children under ten years of age from working in coal pits. They had up to then been employed to pull coal hutches and were known as 'coal-putters'. After women were banned from working below ground, they continued to be employed in emptying and picking unwanted debris from the coal extractions. It took a further 30 years before the Government required children to receive an education before working age.

In 1887 a coal miner earned 4s per day (20 pence; a loaf of bread would have cost a penny).

Greenrigg Colliery, West Lothian, owned by the Loganlea Coal Company, was taken over by United Collieries in 1905. It produced coal and clay, the clay going to the brickworks at Bathgate to make 'Etna' bricks. A fire at Greenrigg Colliery in 1924 destroyed most of the surface buildings and the headframes. The men had to escape through a connecting passage to Southrigg Colliery near Shotts. The pit was reconstructed and continued in operation until 1960.

On 1 January 1947, the NCB (National Coal Board) took over control of all local pits. Many pits nationally needed modernisation and investment. The country's industrial, transport and housing infrastructure needed re-built. By the 1960s small pit production lost out to investment in higher productivity super-pit production. The smaller pits around Polkemmet closed.

=== Coal pits near Harthill ===
Name of Pit	Men Employed Underground	Men Employed Above Ground
East Benhar	64	21
Greenrigg	346	117
Netherton	83	18
Blairmucklehill	249	100
Benhar	620	143
Hassockrigg	263	68
Fortissat	221	41
Hillhouserigg	211	33
Batton	239	65

== Baillie dynasty and legacy ==
Lord Polkemmet (messrs Baillie) and his family, originally from Lanarkshire, had owned much land around Harthill and Whitburn. They had purchased the land from a Mr Alan Shaw in 1620. The Baillies built a mansion in the grounds of the now public Polkemet Country Park and it became the family residence for over 300 years. The Baillies owned many local collieries and Lord Polkemmet's son William was made a baronet in 1823.

Sir William Baillie and his wife Lady Baillie extended the house in 1822 and the building was in continuous ownership by the Baillie family until the 1950s. At its height the building had 39 rooms and offices, 11 domestic servants and servants quarters. The grounds included stables, fodder store, a horse driven mill, a tack room for keeping carriages and later motor cars and tennis courts and bowling green. The Baillie family played an active role in the community, giving significant sums of money for the construction of public buildings and other developments, including the Baillie Institutes (community centres) built in Harthill, Whitburn and Blackburn. The Baillie Institute building in Harthill is now the Pentecostal church. Sir William and Lady Baillie were also responsible for the establishment of the Lady Baillie Sabbath School in Whitburn. Once a year the family would open their mansion to the public and on several other days each summer made it available for Sunday school outings.

One of the most notable members of the Baillie family was the 6th Baronet of Polkemmet, Sir Adrian. He was Deputy Lord Lieutenant of West Lothian and Justice of the Peace. He was Unionist MP for the Linlithgowshire constituency between 1931 and 1935. He married Cecilia (Olive) Wilson-Filmer, the eldest daughter of Lord Queensborough. She reputedly had an income of around £50,000 per year from her grandfather William Collins Whitney, an American multimillionaire. As an MP, Sir Aidrian then spent more time in London and Leeds Castle in Kent. The Baillie family ceased to be resident at Polkemmet from around this time.

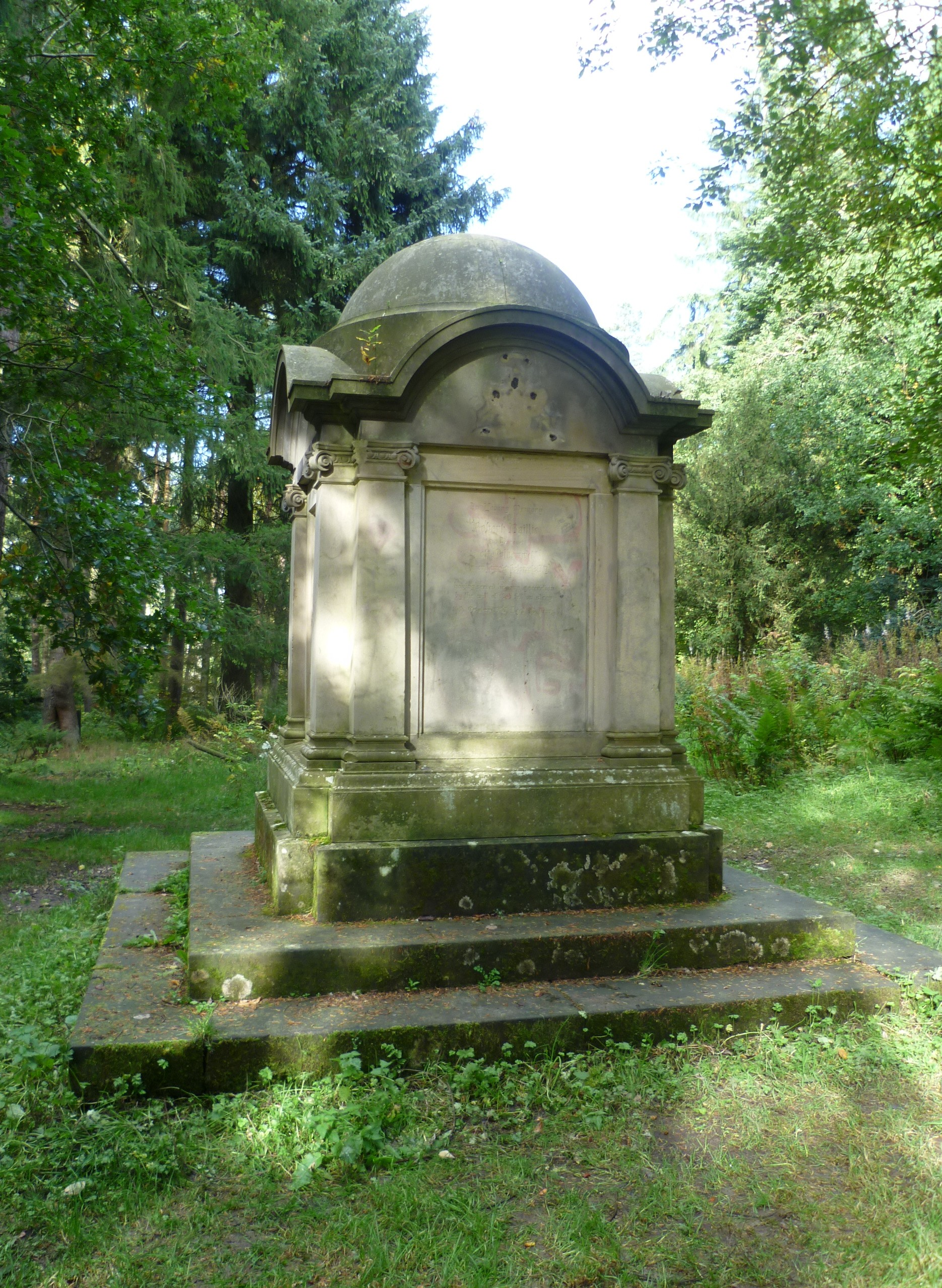
Mausoleum of Sir Adrian Baillie

During the war Polkemmet House was used both as a war hospital and accommodation for Polish soldiers who had fled Nazi-occupied Poland to continue fighting from Britain.

In 1945 Polkemmet House became the 'Trefoil School', originated during the war when a group of people associated with the Girl Guide movement volunteered to take care of handicapped evacuee children there. It was officially opened as the Trefoil School on 25 September by the Princess Elizabeth (The late Queen Elizabeth II). She later became the school's patron. The Trefoil School remained here until 1951 when it moved to Gogarburn, Edinburgh. During this time at Polkemmet the school was visited by some important visitors including, Chief Scout, Lord Rowallan and Princess Mary, the Princess Royal. Following this, the building became the Scottish Police training school before being demolished by the National Coal Board.

Sir Adrian Baillie the 6th Baronet died in 1947 and was interred in the mausoleum within the estate which can be seen there today. The family connection with the estate ended after three centuries. The mausoleum is the only part of the family estate the family now own.

== Religion ==
Up until 1871 Harthill and Eastfield had no church building. Church Presbytery records from Linlithgow record attempts being made to build a church in Harthill. Harthill links with Whitburn Free Church were strong and records from this church record the new church being opened 'Thursday first'. Services had been however previously been held in the school buildings of the Harthill School and the Benhar Works School. Indeed, one of the conditions laid down by Sir William Baillie for providing funds for its construction was that the school should be made available for Sunday Church services. Harthill and Eastfield lay within the parish of Kirk o'Shotts. Until the Scottish Protestant Reformation in 1560 the Kirk o'Shotts location was a Catholic place of worship. St. Catherine's Chapel was built in 1450. It was dedicated to "the blessed Virgin and Catherine of Sienna". Little evidence of the original church remains. After the Reformation, the church became 'Shotts Kirk'. The present building was opened on 26 October 1821 and cost nearly £3,000. The spire of this Church was struck by lightning and completely destroyed on 23 July 1876. There is still evidence of the original cemetery watch-house walls which was a building used for families of the deceased to 'watch' over their graves for body snatchers intent on stealing bodies to sell to the medical communities in Edinburgh and Glasgow for dissection (see the Burke and Hare murders, for this old phenomenon).

The census returns for 1841 showed Harthill had a population of 289 with 60 identifiable families. By 1864 a good number of incomers from Ulster who easily adapted to the way of life in the area. One of these ways included interests in Orangeism and they began to meet regularly with others from their homeland. The area around Harthill was rich in Covenanting history. Orangeism was born in Harthill in 1874 and the first meeting of the District Loyal Orange Lodge No 30 is mentioned having taken place in the William Forrester's Hall. A centennial parade was recorded in August 1977 on the occasion of the 100 anniversary of The Harthill District L.O.L. No.30. A Centenary Ball was held in Benhar House on 5 November that year too.

After the Union of the Crowns of Scotland and England by 1603 and by 1637, King Charles I tried to imposed greater control over the Scottish Kirk by enforcing Episcopal religion and practices on Scotland favoured by the Crown. This was not accepted by many Scots Presbyterians and many thousands of them of all social status would die in fighting for the freedom to follow their own Presbyterian faith and John Knox's Protestant reformation teachings. Thousands signed up to a 'Covenant' in support of maintaining Presbyterian church traditions which had now become illegal under penalty of death for anyone who failed to follow King Charles I Episcopal prayer book. Anyone then found participating in a Covenanters service were at risk of death by the then Government because Church of England practice, prayer books and many customs had to replace the traditional Scots Kirk Presbyterian conventions. Additionally Covenanters were of the opinion that Scotland's interests and identity were best served by maintaining an independent Scottish Parliament and became involved in invasions of England in 1644 and other struggles in Ireland.

=== Churches ===
The Harthill Free Church was formally opened on 20 July 1871 by Reverend William Arnott of Edinburgh. Reported in the Wishaw Press in 1877, the Harthill and Benhar Parish Church was opened. Costing £2,400 and seating 660, the opening ceremony was celebrated on the first Sabbath of April 1877 by the ordination of the Reverend Alexander Watt the missionary to the charge of the new church. The Reverend Taylor of Avondale preached and presided. In the afternoon a large number of Presbytery, etc. dined together at the residence of Sir William Baillie where the customary toasts were given.

In 1879 a decision was taken for Roman Catholics in Harthill to meet and celebrate Mass in the Harthill Public School. When a chapel was eventually planned it was built just outside the old settlement boundary of the village. The planning of a first chapel in neighbouring Whitburn seemed to follow a similar arrangement.

In 2016 the churches in the Harthill area are: Benhar Evangelical Church (which includes, Greenrigg Evangelical Mission), St Andrew's Church of Scotland (which includes, Forrest Memorial Hall), The Harvest Centre (Harthill Pentecostal Community Church); The Gospel Hall, and St Catherine's RC Church.

== Nearby towns and villages ==
=== Towns ===
- Airdrie
- Livingston
- Bathgate
- Shotts
- Bellshill
- Whitburn
- Wishaw
- Greenrigg

== Schools ==
=== 1820 — 1870s ===
James Wilson's Endowed School— Consisted of a single schoolroom on the site of the Main Street School, recently demolished. James Wilson was a Whitburn merchant and endowed the facility. He endowed the sum of £25 salary for a teacher yearly. He left money for the construction and teachers salary for four schools upon his death.

Eastfield School, (Benhar Works School) — Main Buildings Demolished. One of the conditions laid down by Sir William Baillie for providing funds for its construction was that the school should be made available for Sunday Church services. The former school kitchen building is now owned by Eastfield & Harthill Flute Orchestra, and is utilised as their practice venue. The hall has been renamed Benhar Hall in recognition of the miners who formed the orchestra in 1935.

=== 1870s — 1998 ===
Harthill Public School — later renamed as Harthill Junior School. During the 1870s a new school replaced the single roomed James Wilson school which was now unfit for purpose. The Shotts School Board built Harthill school on the Main Street and its adjacent headmaster's house, which was considered to be extravagant accommodation for his requirements when built. By 1872 Parliament had passed the Scottish Education Act which required all children to receive education from the ages of five to twelve. Pupils who failed the Eleven plus exam or who couldn't afford to go to secondary school at Airdrie Academy or St Patrick's High School, Coatbridge continued their education in Harthill Junior School. From the 1970s Harthill Junior School became Harthill Primary School and all pupils left to go on to secondary education. Originally all pupils would go to schools in either Coatbridge or Airdrie with many attending Airdrie Academy, St Margaret's High, or Caldervale in Airdrie or the neighbouring St Patrick's in Coatbridge. From the late 1970s early 1980s Harthill pupils could attend Calderhead High in nearby Shotts.

=== 1999 — present ===
Harthill Primary School was the last school building to stand on the original site of the first school in Harthill Main Street. The two-storey building of some imposing stature was demolished after the opening of Alexander Peden Primary School further west along the Main Street in 1999. The site currently stands empty as of 2010.

Greenrigg Primary School building replaced a stone built school after it was ruined by fire.

Alexander Peden Primary School was built to replace Harthill Primary School in 1999. It replaced not only Harthill Primary but also neighbouring Benhar Primary, Eastfield. Both schools had been categorized as unfit for purpose. Built by the North Lanarkshire Council as their first new school, Alexander Peden Primary was estimated to have cost over £4 million and became the flagship for many new schools that have been built by North Lanarkshire since then. The new school boasted modern features such as extendible dining room and gym hall with stage, state of the art media room, two open-plan classrooms, high tech security entry, alarms and CCTV systems linked into local police and fire stations. The school has a capacity for 300 primary children and 60 nursery children, the nursery is within the school with its own adjacent fenced off play area within the main playground.

The opening of the school was initially planned for August 1997 but was delayed to 1999. Miss Morag Hay was the first Head Teacher of Alexander Peden Primary and Mrs Tina Milligan was the first Deputy Head.

== Polkemmet Country Park ==
The Polkemmet House estate was purchased by West Lothian District Council in 1978, and was redeveloped as a country park, opening in 1981.

== Gala Day ==
The Gala Day has been a tradition in Harthill for over 100 years and includes the neighbouring villages of Eastfield and Greenrigg. A day of fun which begins with the colourful parade of floats, bands and people in fancy dress which marches from the Alexander Peden Primary School on through the streets of all three villages and on into Harthill Public Park. The Crowning Ceremony in the park ends the parade, then the Queen begins the sports and fun. Recent years have seen all sorts of events including para-gliding exhibitions, birds of prey, fireworks display and much more. The travelling fair known locally as 'the shows' are also an attraction during Gala week. Harthill, Eastfield and Greenrigg Children's Gala Day is held annually on the 2nd Saturday in June.

Greenrigg only once held its own Gala day. This happened in 1947 and was held in the Polkemmet estate for the children.

== Sports ==
Harthill is home to the Scottish Junior Football Association (SJFA) club Harthill Royal F.C. Harthill Junior Football Team play in the East of Scotland Junior Football leagues. Although Harthill itself is located in the North Lanarkshire Council authority, the Gibshill park and clubhouse are located in Greenrigg, West Lothian. Facilities include, a floodlight, five a side training pitch, social clubhouse and catering facilities.

The village was briefly home to a senior football club, East Lanarkshire F.C., which played in the Scottish Cup in the late 19th century, and was runner-up in the 1898–99 Lanarkshire Consolation Cup. The village football ground had previously hosted another senior club, West Benhar, notionally at least coming from a nearby village, which won the Lanarkshire Cup in 1882–83 and reached the fifth round of the 1884–85 Scottish Cup.

An annual golf competition is held between golfers from the West Coast and East Coast of Scotland. This is called the Harthill Trophy.

== Notable individuals ==
- Elizabeth Burns (1784—1817), illegitimate daughter of poet Robert Burns. She married John Bishop, overseer at the Polkemmet estate, resided at the estate's 'half way house' on the existing main road B7066. Buried in Whitburn Parish Church graveyard (white headstone still in place).
- Alex Cunningham, Labour MP for Stockton North
- Jimmy Drinnan (1906—1936), footballer who played as an inside forward
- Hugh McQueen (1867—1944), footballer who played as a winger for Liverpool in the late 19th century, brother of Matt
- Matt McQueen (1863—1944), footballer who became a director and manager of Liverpool F.C, brother of Hugh
- John Moore (1943), former footballer, best known as a player for Luton Town
- William E. Somerville (1869—1950), aircraft engineer
- Eric Stevenson (1942–2017), footballer with Hibernian
- Graham Weir (1984), football player who currently plays for Second Division club Brechin City, brother of Steven
- Steven Weir (1988), football striker playing for Australian side South Melbourne FC, brother of Graham
- Colin Cloud (1987), Stage mentalist. Appeared on America's Got Talent in 2017. Described as the closest to Sherlock Holmes.

== Population ==
Year	Population
1861	216
1871	686
1881	1441
1891	1008
2001	3575

== See also ==
- Shottskirk
- Central Scottish
- Blue Bus of North Lanarkshire
- List of places in North Lanarkshire
