= Geographical centre of Scotland =

Geographical center in Perth and Kinross, Scotland, UK

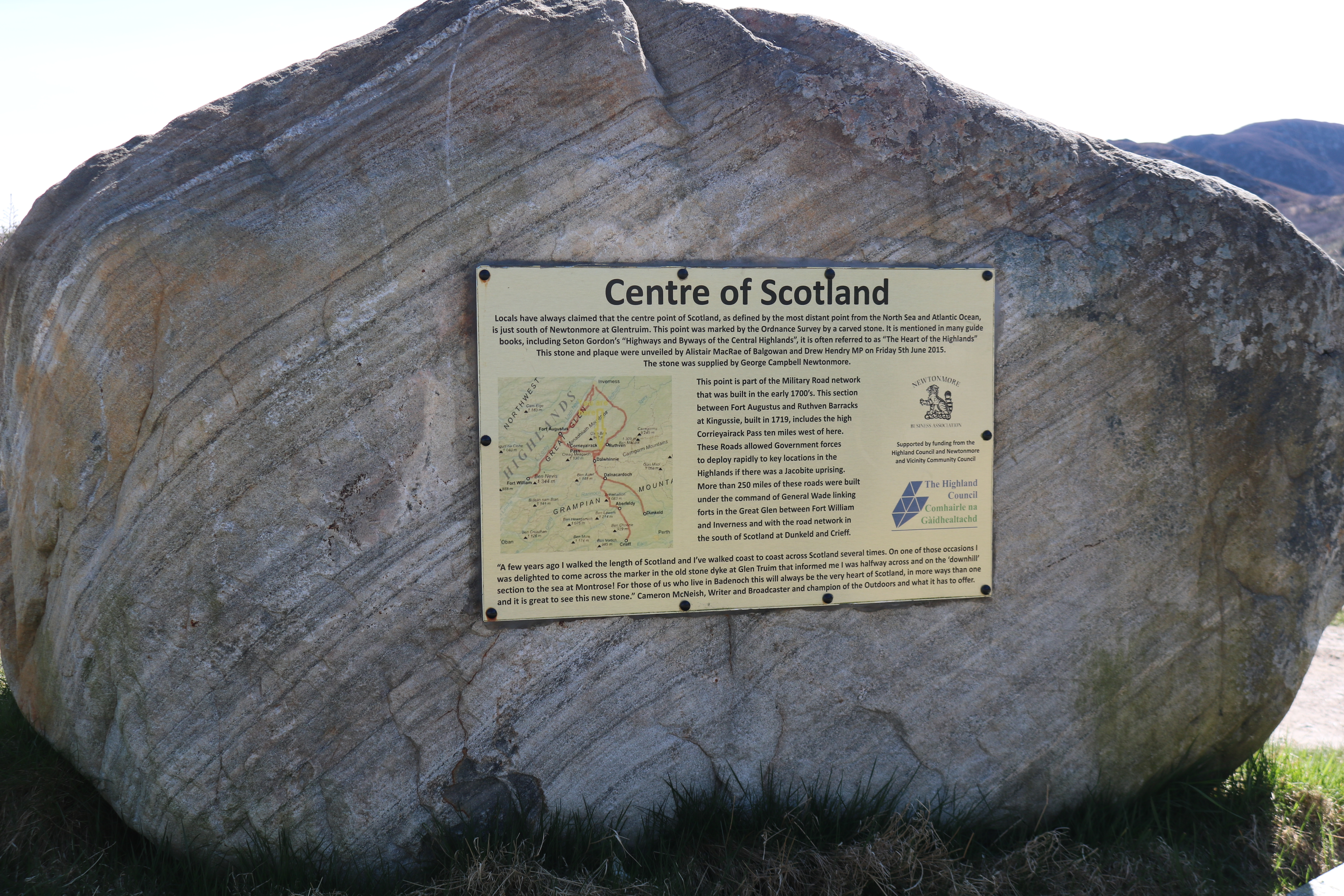
Centre of Scotland stone just north of Dalwhinnie

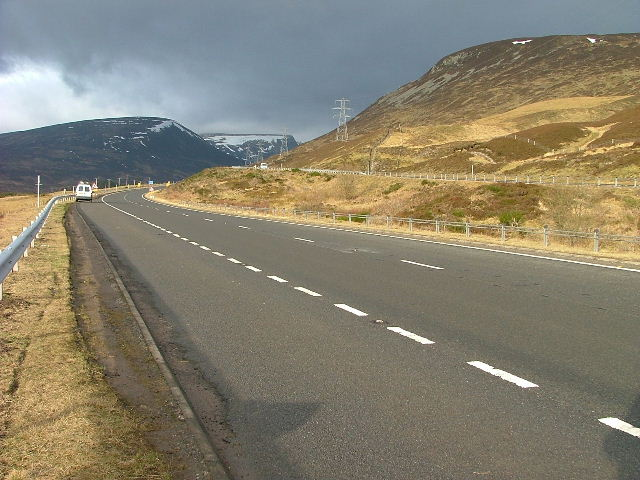
Northbound Carriageway of the A9 close to the centre of Scotland including islands by OS centre of gravity method

There is some debate as to the location of the geographical centre of Scotland. This is due to different methods of calculating the centre, and whether surrounding islands are included.

== Centre of gravity method ==
In 2002, the Ordnance Survey calculated the centre using a mathematical centre of gravity method. This is the mathematical equivalent of calculating the point at which a cardboard cut-out of Scotland could be perfectly balanced on the tip of a pin. It becomes complicated when the islands are included so one simplification is just to ignore them.

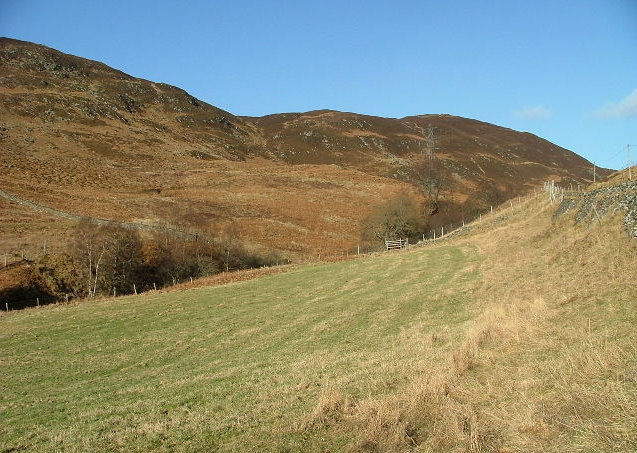
Eastern Slopes of Dun Coillich in Glengoulandie, east of Schiehallion

The Ordnance Survey calculated that the centre of Mainland Scotland is at NN7673153751 (56°39′33.86″N 4°0′40.37″W). The point is 5 km east of the mountain of Schiehallion, which is sometimes claimed to be at the centre of Scotland.

== Including islands ==
The centre point including islands was found to be at grid reference NN6678471599 (56°49.0153′N 4°10.959′W). This is on a hillside in Glen Garry, near the Pass of Drumochter.

Nearby, it is claimed that the centre lies a few miles from the village of Newtonmore, Badenoch. It is marked by a stone set into a wall.

== Latitude and longitude ==
Another cruder method is to take the intersection between the line of latitude midway between the most northerly and southerly points on the Scottish mainland, and the line of longitude midway between the most easterly and westerly points. In the days when Corrachadh Mòr in Ardnamurchan was undisputedly the most westerly point, this also produced 56 degrees 39 minutes N, 4 degrees 0 minutes W, very near the summit of Schiehallion.

However the construction of the Skye Bridge, arguably turning Skye into part of the Scottish mainland, may have upset some of these calculations.

== Megalithic centre ==
Faskally Cottages

Less credible candidates for the centre of Scotland also exist. The Society of Antiquaries of Scotland in 1908 suggested the megalithic Faskally Cottages Standing Stones. The Society were aware of other contenders of the centre of Scotland: "Various spots have been so designated: a site at Struan, several miles to the N.W. of Faskally; also a house on the Killiecrankie road, being the most talked of besides a house in the Fair City of Perth itself."

== Historic centre ==
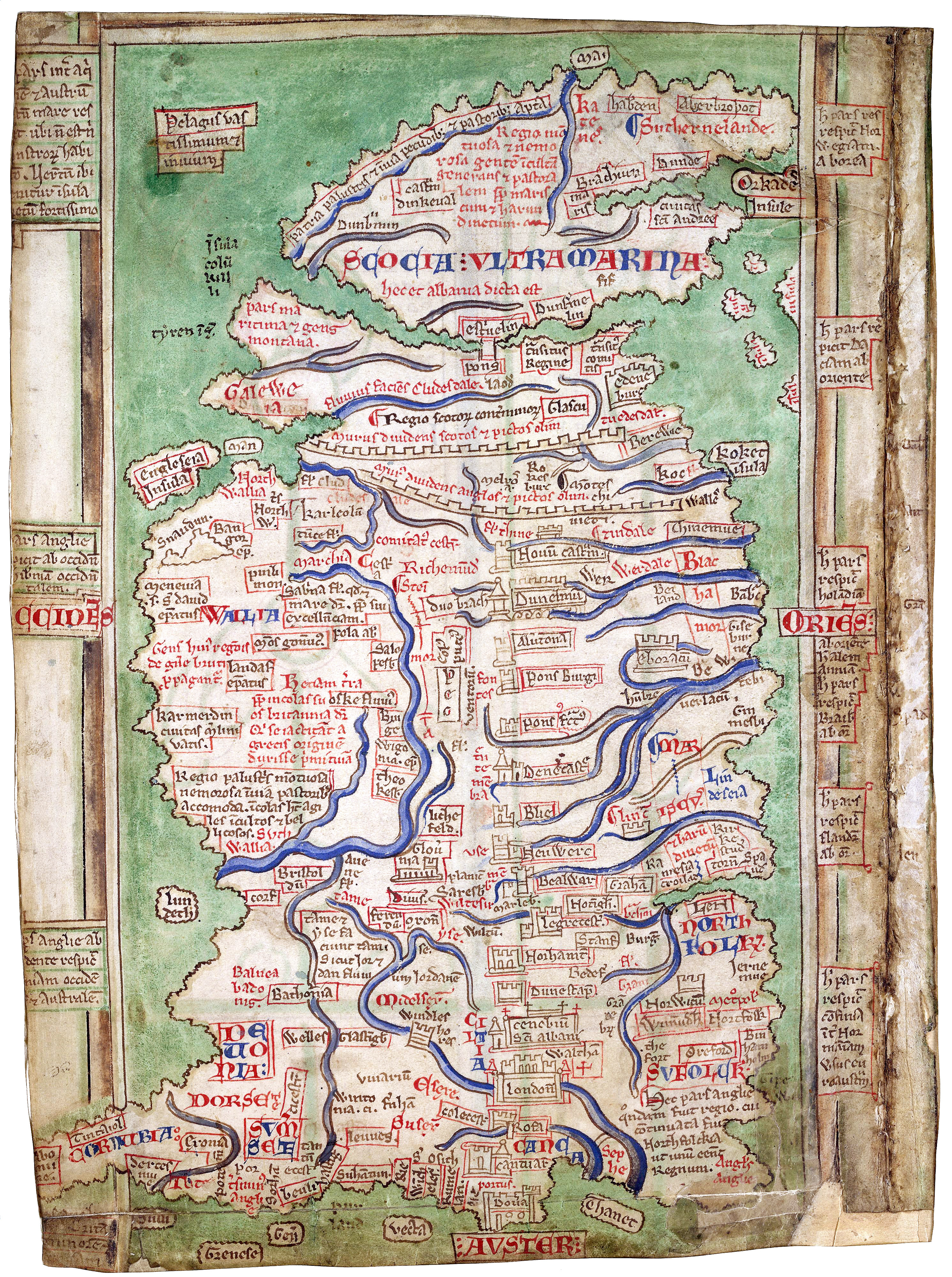
The Centre of Stirling Bridge - The Heart of Scotland

Matthew Paris's map of 1247 shows a clear north–south divide to Scotland. Proverbially Stirling is the strategically important "Gateway to the Highlands". It has been said that "Stirling, like a huge brooch clasps Highlands and Lowlands together". There is also and east–west divide as told in the story as recorded by Boece who relates that in 855 Scotland was invaded by two Northumbrian princes, Osbrecht and Ella. They united their Northumberian Anglian forces with the Lowland Strathclyde Britons in order to defeat the Highland Pictish Scots. Having secured Stirling castle, they built the first stone bridge over the Forth. On the top they reportedly raised a crucifix with the inscription: "Anglos, a Scotis separat, crux ista remotis; Arma hic stant Bruti; stant Scoti hac sub cruce tuti." It may be the stone cross was a tripoint for the three kingdom's borders or marches. In this way the stone cross in the centre of Stirling Bridge was the heart of Scotland.

== Central Belt and Watershed ==
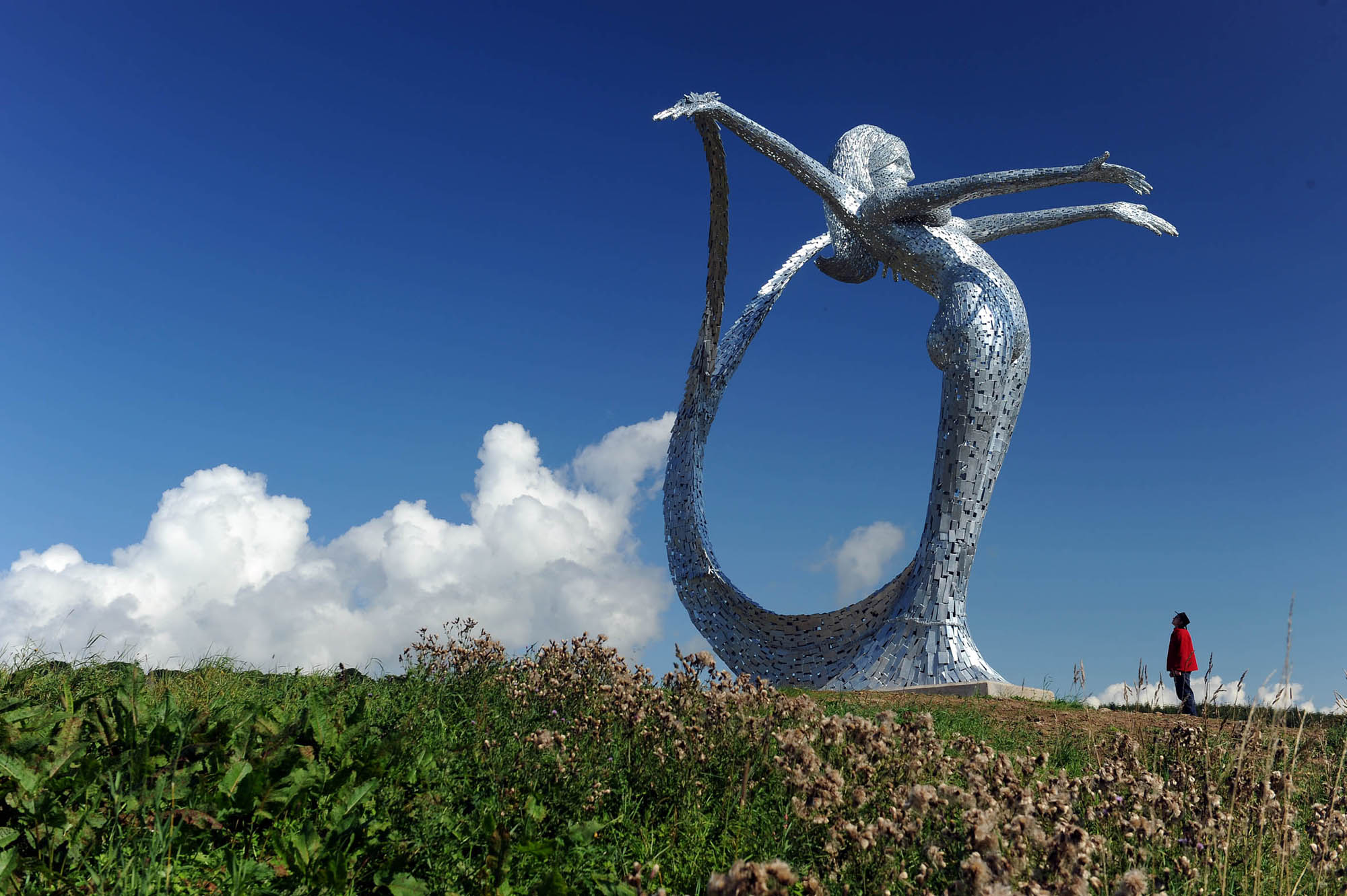
Andy Scott Arria Cumbernauld with a poem "Watershed" inscribed on its base.

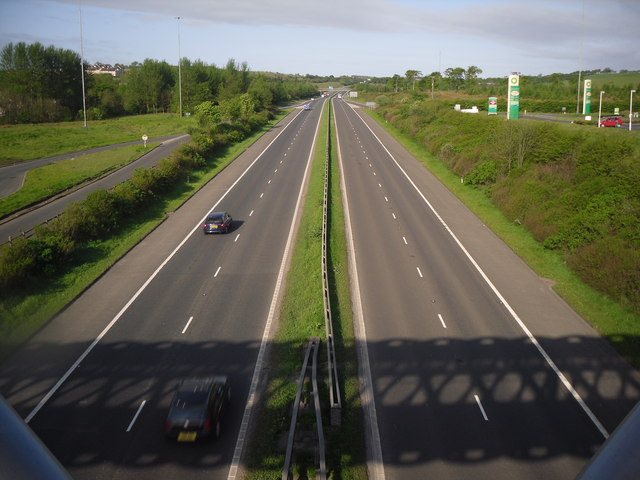
The M8 towards Glasgow from the footbridge at Heart of Scotland services

The centre of the Central Belt may also be a point of interest. The Heart of Scotland services known as Harthill is close to the centre of the M8 motorway, Scotland's main road linking East with West. Cumbernauld, also in the Central Belt, is a watershed with one of its rivers (from which its name is derived) flowing to the east and the other flowing west. This watershed test could also apply to other sites like the summit of Ben Lomond being on the line of the Scottish watershed but Cumbernauld arguably has this property in its very name. A map of Scotland's watershed has been produced for walkers.

== Furthest from the sea ==
There have been other centres suggested, such as the furthest point from salt water including sea lochs. Geographically, this is known as the pole of inaccessibility. The point furthest from the Mean High Water mark is in Glen Quoich, near Braemar, in Aberdeenshire which is 67.6 km from the sea.

As with other topics like defining the location of the North Pole the answer largely depends on which criteria you choose.

== Other contenders ==
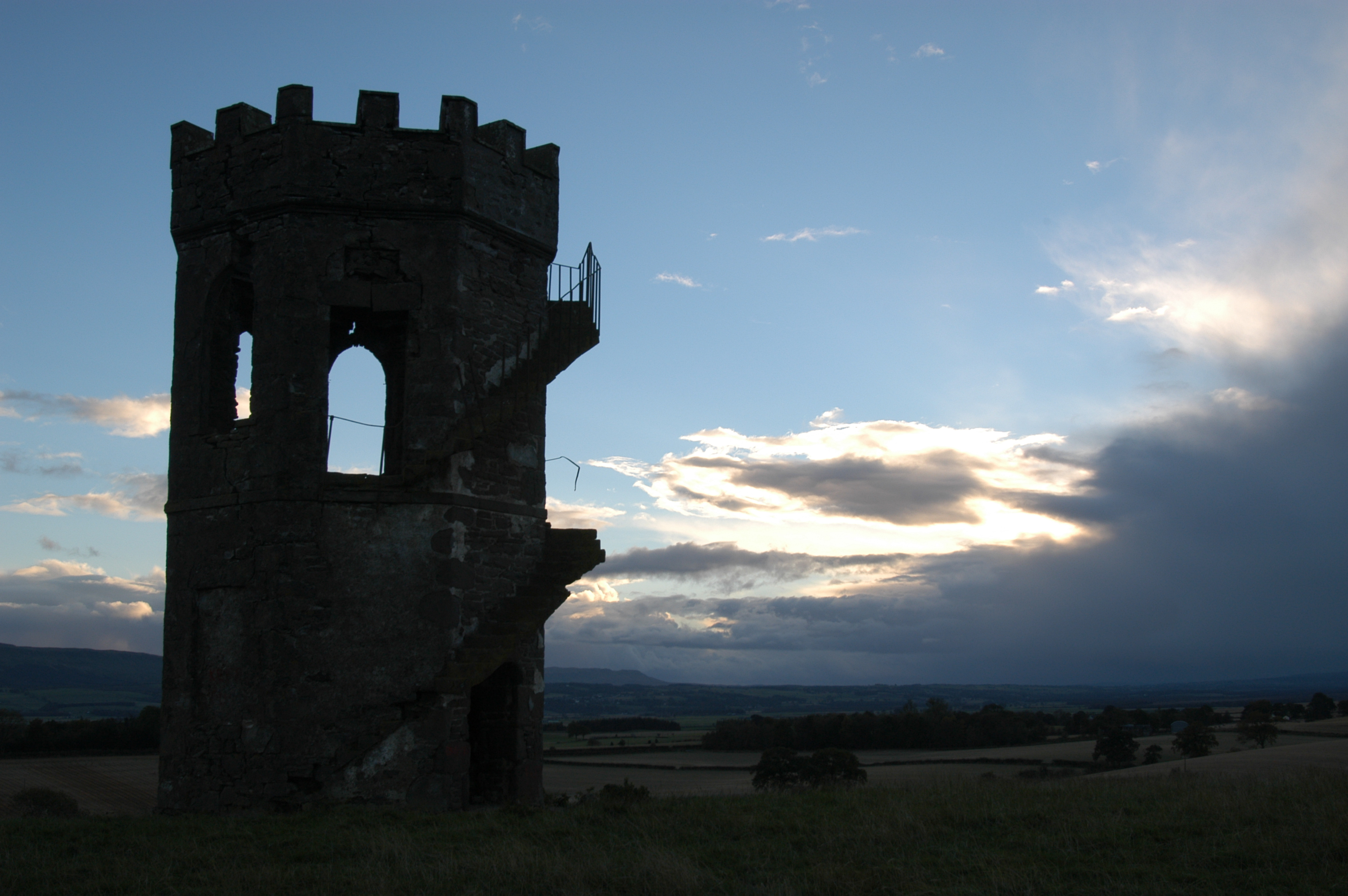
Gartincaber Tower - now destroyed

Some have also claimed Gartincaber Tower for the title. Even some Stirlingshire residents consider it ahead of Stirling Bridge.

== See also ==
- Extreme points of Scotland
- Geographical centre of Europe
- Centre points of the United Kingdom
