= John Murphy (footballer, born 1942) =

Scottish footballer (1942–2020)

John 'Spud' Murphy (6 December 1942 – 23 April 2020) was a Scottish footballer who played his entire senior career with Ayr United.

A full-back, Murphy made a club record 459 Scottish Football League appearances for 'The Honest Men' from 1963 to 1978 and was inducted to the club's Hall of Fame in 2007.

Murphy died on 23 April 2020, aged 77, after a long illness.
