= Harthill Royal F.C. =

Association football club in Scotland

Harthill Royal
- Full name: Harthill Royal Football Club
- Founded: 1992
- Ground: Gibbshill Park; East Main Street; Greenrigg
- Capacity: 1,800
- Coordinates: 55°51′37″N 3°44′39″W
- Manager: Alain Davidson
- League: East of Scotland League Second Division
- 2025–26: East of Scotland League Second Division, 11th of 15
Home colours	Away colours

Harthill Royal Football Club is a Scottish football club based in the Greenrigg area of West Lothian (adjoining Harthill in North Lanarkshire). Previously an amateur side called Harthill Royal Bar, the club shortened their name on joining the Scottish Junior Football Association, East Region in 1992. Club colours are royal blue. Their Gibbshill Park ground was previously the home of Polkemmet Juniors F.C. (1937–1954, 1974–1988) and known as Beechbank Park.

The SJFA restructured prior to the 2006–07 season, and Royal found themselves in the 15-team East Region, South Division. Harthill spent all of their time in the bottom tier of the Juniors, with a best finish of 3rd in 2007–08.

For the 2021–22 season, they joined West of Scotland Football League in the senior pyramid and were placed in Division Four. Despite their ground's West Lothian location being in the East of Scotland Football League catchment area, the club was allowed to choose which league to join due to the village of Harthill being situated in North Lanarkshire. However, the club then returned to the East of Scotland Football League, joining the Third Division for the 2022–23 season.

== Club staff ==
=== Board of directors ===
Role	Nationality	Name
Secretary	(Scotland)	Audrey Gray
Club Official	(Scotland)	David Dowds

=== Coaching staff ===
Role	Nationality	Name
Manager	(Scotland)	Alain Davidson

== Managerial history ==
Name	Nationality	Years
Alex Gibb	(Scotland)	1985-1990
Willie Garner	(Scotland)	2000-2002
Paul McKinlay	(Scotland)	?-2012
James McAllister	(Scotland)	?-2015
Ian Rankin	(Scotland)	2015-?
Steph Carr	(Scotland)	?
Ali Grier & Stevie Barclay	(Scotland)	?-2021
David Carmichael	(Scotland)	2021-2022
Alain Davidson	(Scotland)	2022-

^{c} Caretaker manager

== Honours ==
- Dechmont League Cup: 1999–00, 2004–05
- Lothians District Division Two winners: 2002–03
- East Region Division Two winners: 1992–93, 1994–95, 1999–00
- Brown Cup: 2002–03

== Sources ==
- Non-league Scotland
- Scottish Football Historical Archive
