= Jimmy Fleming (footballer, born 1929) =

Scottish footballer (1929–2019)

Personal information
- Full name: James Freeburn Fleming
- Date of birth: 7 January 1929
- Place of birth: Glasgow, Scotland
- Date of death: 20 August 2019 (aged 90)
- Place of death: Rutherglen, Scotland
- Position: Full back

Senior career*
Years	Team	Apps	(Gls)
- Tollcross Cydale
1952–1954	Stirling Albion	19	(0)
1954–1958	Workington	88	(1)
1958–1961	Berwick Rangers	69	(1)
Total		176	(2)
- * Club domestic league appearances and goals

James Freeburn Fleming (7 January 1929 – 20 August 2019) was a Scottish professional footballer, who played as a full back.

== Career ==
Born in Glasgow, Fleming played for Tollcross Cydale, Stirling Albion, Workington and Berwick Rangers. He became a plumber after his retirement from playing football.

== Death ==
Fleming died in Rutherglen on 20 August 2019, at the age of 90.
