= Whitburn Academy =

Location
- Shanks Road; Whitburn, West Lothian, EH47 0HL; Scotland; 55.8686°N 3.6795°W

Information
- Type: Secondary school
- Established: 1967
- Local authority: West Lothian Council
- Head teacher: Tracey Loudon
- Gender: Mixed
- Houses: Bruce; Douglas; Wallace
- Website: www.whitburnacademy.westlothian.org.uk

Whitburn Academy is a mixed secondary school in Whitburn, West Lothian, Scotland.

== Twinned school ==
Whitburn Academy is twinned with Mzuzu Government Secondary School in Malawi.

== Press coverage and achievements ==
In December 2017, students from Whitburn Academy used various fundraising methods, such as a non-dress code day and other events to buy a defibrilator for the school. The defibrilator was bought from ALBA care. The students from Whitburn Academy also designed the logo for the station at Whitburn Cross.

In March 2018, S3 pupil Rachel Mann won the 21st Schuh shoe design competition, in which schools all across West Lothian competed in. She won the grand prize of the Schuh trophy and a year's worth of free shoes.
