= Polkemmet Country Park =

Park in Whitburn, Scotland

Coordinates: 55°51′57″N 3°43′15″W

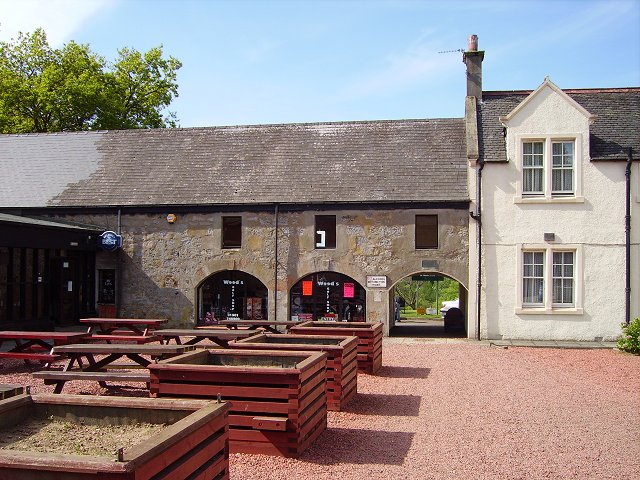
Visitor facilities at Polkemmet Country Park, in the former stable block of Polkemmet House

Polkemmet Country Park is located 2 kilometres (1.2 mi) west of the town of Whitburn in West Lothian, Scotland and east of the village of Greenrigg. It is a 3 star Visitor Attraction (Visitscotland). It is adjacent to the M8 motorway, 2 kilometres (1.2 mi) east of the "Heart of Scotland" services at Harthill. It was developed on the estate of Polkemmet House, a country house which was demolished in the 1960s. The estate was bought by West Lothian District Council in 1978, and the country park was opened to the public in 1981. The park covers 169 hectares (420 acres), and is managed by West Lothian Council. The park is also home to the Scottish Owl Centre.

== History ==
The family of Baillie purchased the Polkemmet estate in 1620, and built a country house here. In 1823, William Baillie was created a baronet, and extended the house. It remained in the Baillie family until the 1950s, although from the 1930s it was not occupied, after Sir Adrian Baillie, the 6th Baronet, moved his main residence to Leeds Castle in Kent. During the Second World War Polkemmet House was requisitioned, and used both as a war hospital and accommodation for Polish soldiers who had fled Nazi-occupied Poland to fight for Britain. Sir Adrian Baillie died in 1947 and was interred in the mausoleum within the estate.

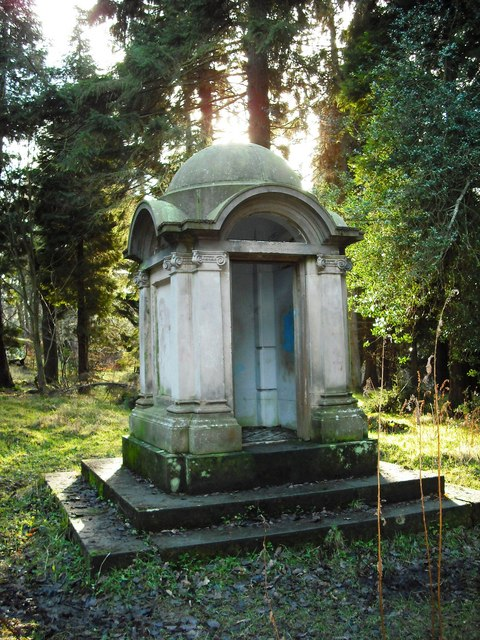
The Baillie Mausoleum

Following the war, Polkemmet House became a Trefoil School, run by the Girl Guides movement. It was officially opened as the Trefoil School on 25 September 1945 by Princess Elizabeth (later Elizabeth II of the United Kingdom), who later became the school's patron. In 1951 the Trefoil School moved to Gogarburn outside Edinburgh. Polkemmet House was used by the Scottish Police College from 1951 until 1960, when the college moved to Tulliallan Castle in Fife. The house and estate were then sold to the National Coal Board (NCB), who operated extensive opencast mines in the surrounding area.

The house was a two-storey structure in the Scots Baronial style. The exterior was the result of rebuilding and extensions in 1822, 1878 and 1912, although with the 17th-century mansion of the Baillies at its core. It was demolished in the 1960s, although the block of stables and offices survives. This included stable staff accommodation, stables, tack room, horse-driven mill, fodder store and carriages accommodation, arranged around a courtyard. Three of the original staff dwelling houses remain part of this block and are occupied to this day. The NCB however retained ownership of one of the dwelling houses when the estate was sold to the council. The only other part of the park not owned by the council is the area around the Baillie family mausoleum. The house was located at grid reference NS92476494.

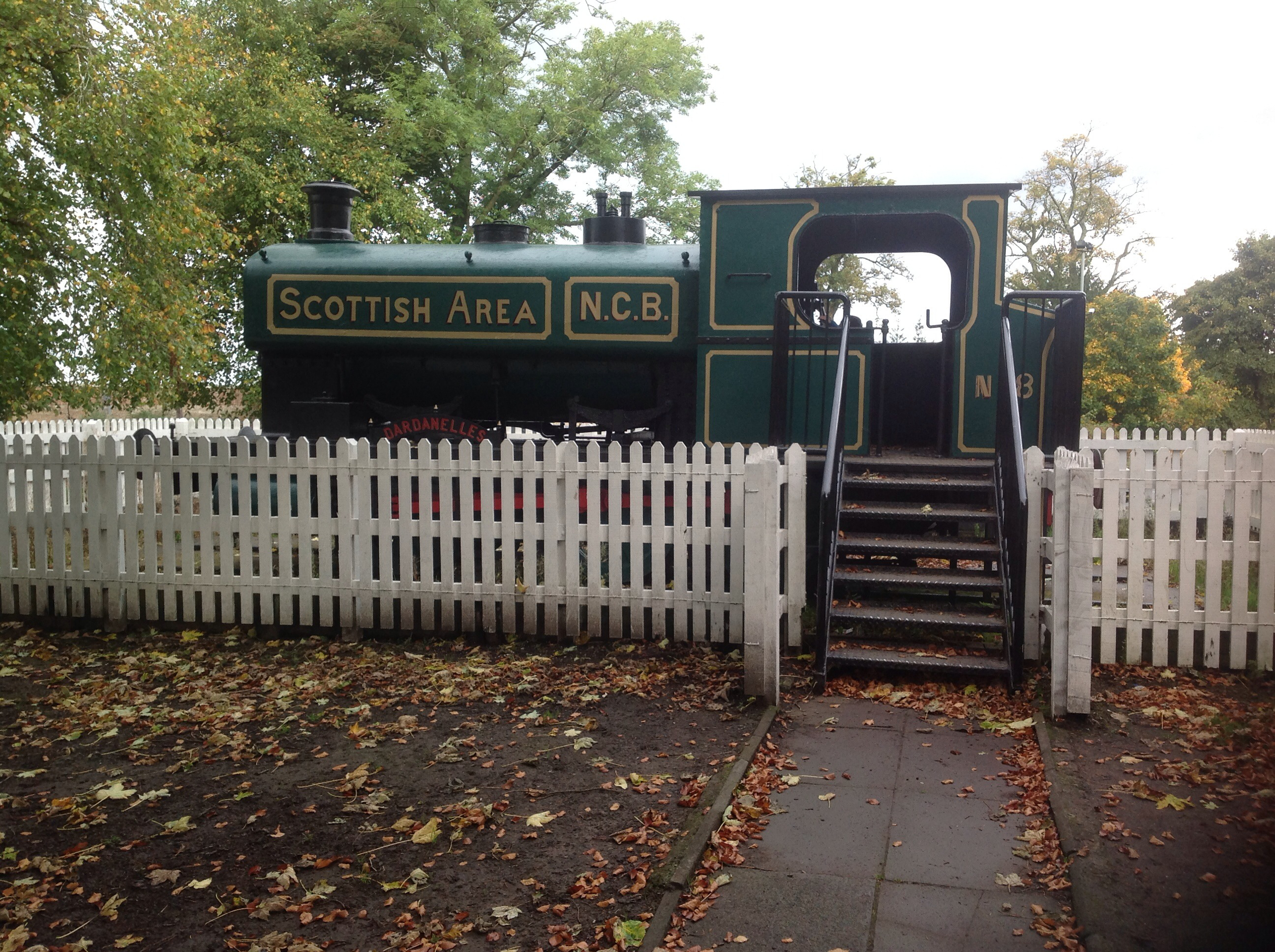
Newly painted NCB Locomotive Dardanelles used in Polkemmet Colliery which is now on display at the park.

In 1978, West Lothian District Council purchased the Polkemmet House estate for £70,000 from the NCB, with a 75% grant from the Countryside Commission for Scotland. The stable block was redeveloped as visitor and staff facilities, and a golf course was created in the grounds. The redeveloped estate was opened to the public on 26 June 1981 by Councillor Bert Gamble.

== The park ==
The park straddles the upper part of the River Almond, one of the main rivers of West Lothian, which rises near Harthill before meandering through the park. A golf course (Polkemmet Golf Club) and driving range occupies much of the park, although substantial areas of woodland remain. Walking routes run through the whole of the former estate. Other facilities include a bowling green, picnic areas, children's play area and car parking. The former stable and office buildings house a cafe, the golf course office and shop, maintenance facilities and public toilets. A barbecue area was created on the site of the old tennis courts. The park has an extensive variety of tree species. Some of the notable trees have information signs indicating the variety and history of the genus. The park is open all year round.

== Scottish Owl Centre ==
Since 2012 the park has been the site of the Scottish Owl Centre. The centre contains dozens of owls, including many breeding pairs. The centre holds flight performances for visitors and visitors are able to see most of the owls in their aviaries. In July 2019, a band-bellied owl was born, the first owl of its type from South America to be born in the UK. In March 2022, a short-eared owl was born at the centre, the first such owl to be born in the UK for 30 years. In June 2022, a spectacled owl was born at the centre.

== The Horn ==
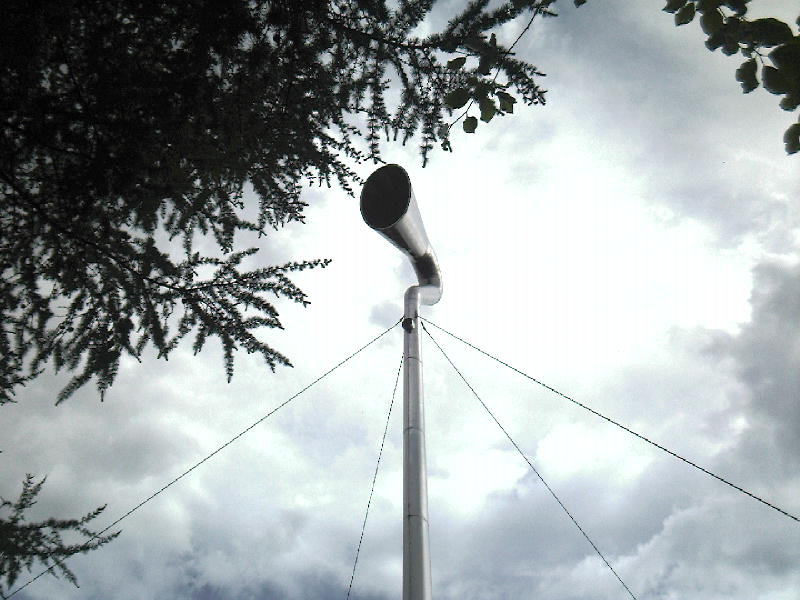
The Horn, Polkemmet Country Park

"The Horn" is a 24-metre (79 ft) high sculpture, located at the north-east corner of the country park, beside the M8 motorway. The stainless steel sculpture was commissioned by West Lothian Council, and was designed by artists Matthew Dalziel and Louise Scullion. It was inaugurated on 21 November 1997 by Magnus Linklater, then chairman of the Scottish Arts Council. On windy days, the horn plays recorded music, poetry and famous quotes. The Horn could be classed as a speaker in itself, inside the bottom contains two 1990s Yamaha AX-596 Stereo Amplifiers which are connected to a device that automatically plays the content.
