= Heart of Scotland services =

M8 services in North Lanarkshire, Scotland

Coordinates: 55.8634°N 3.7583°W

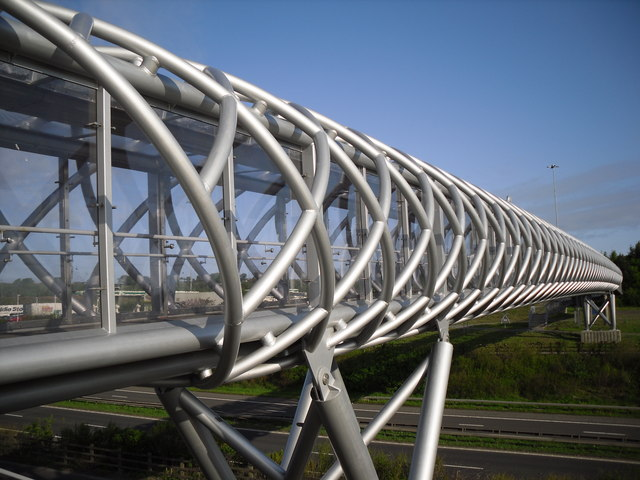
The 2008 pedestrian bridge

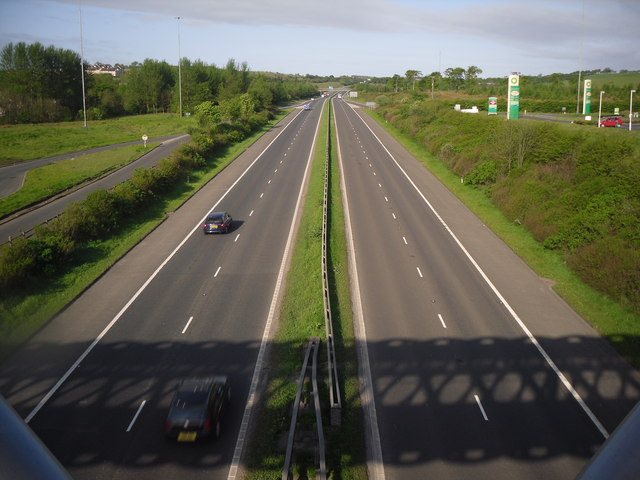
The M8 towards Glasgow from Harthill footbridge

Heart of Scotland services, commonly referred to as Harthill services, is a motorway service station on the M8 motorway between junctions 4a & 5, at Harthill, in North Lanarkshire, Scotland (although less than 1 mile (1.6 km) from the boundary with West Lothian and roughly equidistant between Edinburgh and Glasgow, slightly closer to the latter). It is owned by Transport Scotland and is leased to BP. It used to be leased to RoadChef. The Service Station is the only one on the M8 Motorway, and can be busy, especially at peak times.

When opened in 1971, it was Scotland's first service station. It was known as Harthill Service Area.

The original 1971 pedestrian bridge across the motorway was replaced by a modern helical truss structure in 2008. The sections of the new bridge were fabricated off site and transported to site where they were assembled and lifted into place in one piece on 4 October 2008. The £5 million bridge opened to pedestrians and cyclists on 26 November 2008.

== See also ==
- The centre of Scotland
