= Whitburn, West Lothian =

Coordinates: 55.86210°N 3.68719°W

Whitburn: Scottish Gaelic: Am Fionn Allt
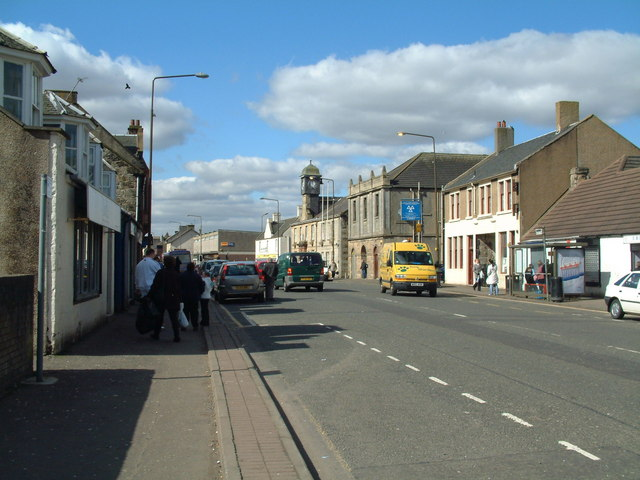
- Whitburn, looking west towards the town centre

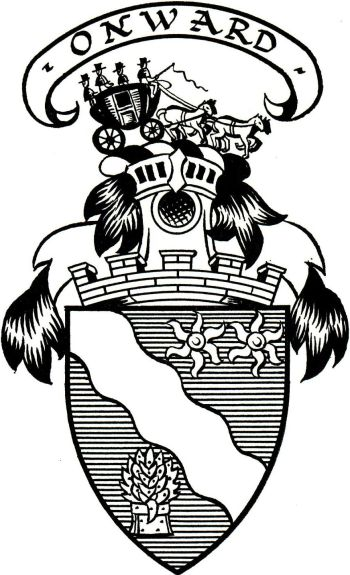
- Coat of arms of Whitburn; Onward

- Location within West Lothian
- Population: 11,490 (2020)
- OS grid reference: NS945645
- Council area: West Lothian
- Lieutenancy area: West Lothian
- Country: Scotland
- Sovereign state: United Kingdom
- Post town: BATHGATE
- Postcode district: EH47
- Dialling code: 01501
- Police: Scotland
- Fire: Scottish
- Ambulance: Scottish
- UK Parliament: Bathgate and Linlithgow
- Scottish Parliament: Linlithgow

Whitburn (originally Whiteburn) is a town on the south bank of the River Almond in West Lothian, Scotland, halfway between Scotlands's two largest cities, about 23 miles (37 kilometres) east of Glasgow and 22 miles (35 kilometres) west of Edinburgh. The nearest major towns are Bathgate, four miles (six kilometres) and Livingston, six miles (ten kilometres).

== History ==
Originally a small farming and weaving community centred around the White Burn, the stream from which Whitburn takes its name, the settlement was once a district of Linlithgow until 1973 and a parish of Livingston until 1730, when it became an independent parish as the population began to rise. The burn later became synonymous with the area's shale and coal industries, with pollution frequently turning its waters black during the industrial era. "The White Burn Turns Black". Scottish Shale. When reliable statistics began with the Statistical Accounts of Scotland the population was counted at 1,121 in 1755 followed by a more accurately count of 1,322 in 1795.

Whitburn has appeared on maps since the 17th century of the Early Modern period and appears on a manuscript authored by Scottish map maker John Adair in 1680. The earliest documented reference to Whitburn is dated 26 September 1363 and can be found in the Index of Charters by King David II of Scotland. It grants William de Carnys and his heir Duncan a concession to the terms upon which they held the baronies of Easter and Wester Whitburn. There were also two gold pieces of Roman coin discovered in a field in 1845 but there is no other evidence of Roman occupation.

During the Age of Enlightenment the community was trading cotton, pig iron and coal. "Old quarries" can be seen dotted over the area on the Ordnance Survey 1st Edition map, presumably from the days of clay, sandstone and iron ore extraction. The majority of farmers rented agricultural land because of the Lowland Clearances and most of it was owned by Esquires.

Between the 18th and 20th century the town was dominated by mines with the largest being Polkemmet Colliery – a large coal mine, discovered in the town in the late 1800s – but this was closed in the 1980s as a result of damage by underground flooding during the 1984–85 miners' strike and never re-opened. The colliery buildings have gone, and the coal bings that once were prominent have now been removed. Work to dismantle Bing No 3, the infamous burning bing, started in August 2006 and was completed by February 2008. The last major outbreak of burning occurred in 1998. As of 2017 the bings have been flattened and it is now a large housing estate as a result from the Heartlands Project.

There was a Scottish Police College located on the current site of Townhead Gardens in the 1940s, before it moved to the old mansion at Polkemmet.

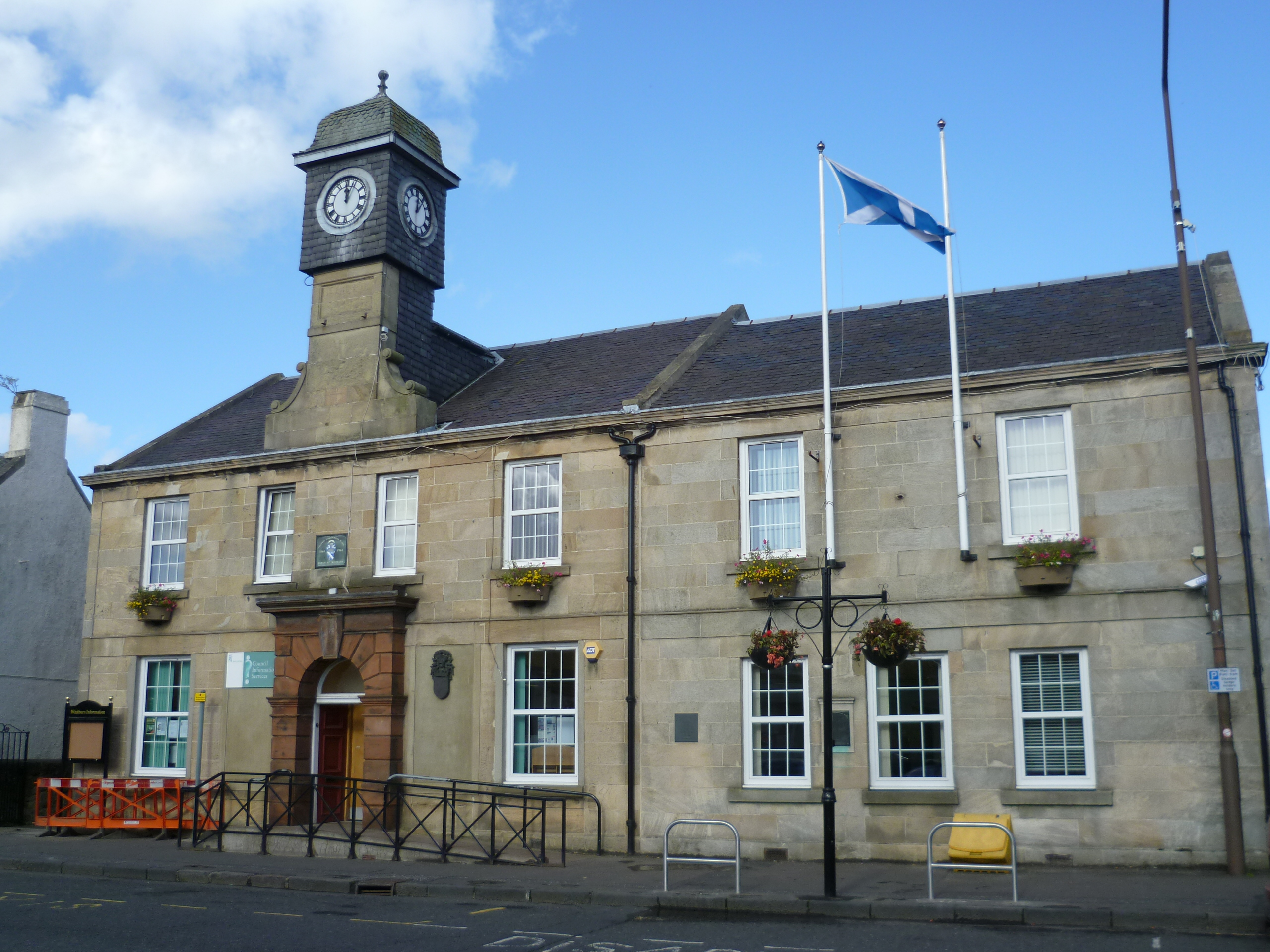
Whitburn Council Offices

The town's population was boosted by the 1960s Glasgow overflow. The town's Murraysgate and surrounding areas north-west of the cross were established to deal with the overflow.

== Schools ==
The town has 5 primary schools, 4 of which have nurseries within. These five schools are known as Croftmalloch Primary School, Polkemmet Primary School, Burnhouse, St Joseph's Primary School and Whitdale Primary School.

Whilst four of the schools are non-denominational, St Joseph's is regarded as a Catholic school. Burnhouse school is for children with behavioural difficulties who cannot be placed in mainstream schools.

The local secondary school is Whitburn Academy. It is a state run non-denominational secondary school serving pupils aged 11 to 18. Its catchment area is the town of Whitburn and the surrounding villages of Fauldhouse, Longridge, East Whitburn, Stoneyburn, and Greenrigg. There are approximately 1000 pupils at the school.

== Sport and recreation ==
Whitburn has a King George's Field in memory of King George V which was opened in 1955 by Queen Elizabeth II.

On 16 January 2012, a planning application was submitted regarding the rebuild of the swimming pool; drawings of the new facility were posted on the Xcite Leisure Website.

Whitburn is home to Whitburn Junior F.C. who play at Central Park and compete in the East of Scotland Football League. In 2000 they won the Scottish Junior Cup.

The town holds its annual gala day on the fourth Saturday in June; there is a parade through the town, followed by games and races at King George V Park. The gala day is part of a week of activities known as the "Civic Week"; this also includes a fairground and a fireworks display in King George V Park.

Polkemmet Country Park is located to the west of the town, and incorporates woodland, a golf course, cafe, and play area. The park is also locally famous for the Polkemmet Horn which can be seen from the M8 motorway which runs to the north of the country park. There is also a disused steam locomotive from Polkemmet Colliery on display. Since 2012 Polkemmet Park has also been the site of the Scottish Owl Centre.

== Industry ==
The town was once the site of Levi Strauss & Co., the clothing manufacturer. The plant opened in 1969, employing a work force of over 500 local people. At its height, the plant was producing 4 million pairs of jeans in a year. The plant shut its doors in December 1999.

== Bands ==
The Whitburn Band is a brass band formed in 1870. The band has been successful on the contest stage and competes at the British Open, National Final and European Championships, and has been Scottish Champion on 19 occasions. In 2017, the Whitburn Band was ranked 6th in the world in the 4barsrest rankings.

Whitburn Flute Band was formed in the town in 1962, although it is thought the band may have existed in some form before this. The band host their annual parade through the town on the first Saturday in April. The parade attracts bands from all over the UK who come to compete.

== Transport ==
The M8 motorway passes to the north of the town.

A shared cycle and pedestrian path along the B8084 road was completed in 2021 following an investment of £1.2 million, providing an off-road cycle route and enabling pedestrian access to Armadale.

Lothian Country operate Services:

- X18 - Whitburn - Armadale - Bathgate - Broxburn - Corstorphine - Edinburgh
- 72 - Fauldhouse - Whitburn - Livingston - Broxburn - Winchburgh

== Notable people ==
- Elizabeth Bishop (Burns) (1785–1817) – Robert Burns's first illegitimate child, married John Bishop, factor to the Laird of Polkemmet, and was buried in the Whitburn churchyard.
- John Paterson (1926–2000) – former professional footballer for Hibernian F.C.
- Jimmy Ferguson (*1935) – former professional footballer for Dundee, Falkirk, Oldham Athletic, Crewe Alexandra, Darlington and Stenhousemuir
- Jim Irvine (*1940) – former professional footballer for Dundee United, Middlesbrough, Hearts and Barrow
- John Lambie (1941–2018) – played for Falkirk and manager of Hamilton and Partick Thistle.
- Wilson Wood (1943–2017) – footballer, played for Glasgow Rangers
- Duncan Lambie (1952–2015) – footballer for Dundee, St Johnstone, SpVgg. Fürth and Hibernian
- Andy Mooney (*1955) – CEO of Fender, and inventor of the 'Disney Princess' concept.
- Danny Lennon (*1969) – former professional footballer and former manager of St Mirren F.C.
- Iain Cook (*1974) – musician, composer, and record producer who is currently a member of Glasgow-based electronic trio Chvrches.
- David Baillie (*1977) – writer, born in West Lothian, known for comicbook work such as 2000 AD and Red Thorn.
- Scott Boyd (*1986) professional footballer for Kilmarnock, Ross County, Partick Thistle and Livingston
- Leon Jackson (*1988) – Scottish singer
- Jamie Brandon (*1998) – professional footballer for Livingston FC
- The Snuts – Jack Cochrane, Joe McGillivray (East Whitburn), Callum Wilson, Jordan Mackay
- Lewis Capaldi (*1996) – singer-songwriter and musician
