= Aberdeen University Sport and Recreation =

Sports venue in Aberdeen, Scotland

There are various facilities providing sport at the University of Aberdeen, run by Aberdeen University Sport and Recreation Services (SRS). This department of the university is responsible for the sports facilities, sports classes and the development team; it works in partnership with Aberdeen University Students' Association (AUSA) and the Aberdeen University Sports Union (AUSU). Its current director is David Beattie.

== Facilities ==
King's Pavilion

- King's Pavilion at King's College, was completed in 1941 and contains a 20-yard swimming pool, performance gym, performance suite and "away" team outdoor changing rooms.
- Butchart Recreation Centre was constructed in the 1950s and contains the Sports Union Offices, Aberdeen University Sport and Recreation offices, Sports Development Team, four squash courts, one four badminton court games hall, a smaller single badminton court gymnasium, the fleet of vehicles and underground club storage.
- King's Playing Fields, across the road from Butchart, has two rugby pitches, a cricket wicket and lacrosse pitch. "Away" team changing is done in Kings Pavilion and home team changing in Butchart Recreation Centre.
- Hillhead Centre is a short distance away, by Hillhead Halls of Residence. It houses Grampian Institute of Sport, bar and conference suite. It has a floodlit full-size grass football pitch and sand-based floodlit full-size hockey pitch.
- Balgownie Playing Fields Slightly further from the main campus than the Hillhead Centre, this consists of a floodlit rugby training area, club storage, bar and club room, changing rooms, floodlit running track, floodlit football pitch and numerous other football, rugby, Gaelic football and shinty playing fields.
- Aberdeen University Boat House is found in the south of Aberdeen on the River Dee, and houses all the university's rowing boats.
- Aberdeen Sports Village
