= Sport in Aberdeen =

Aberdeen is home to three Commonwealth Games swimmers and Aberdeen Football Club.

== Football ==
Aberdeen's largest football club is Aberdeen Football Club, but there are also other senior teams, notably Cove Rangers. There was also a historic senior team Bon Accord who no longer play.

Local junior teams include Banks O' Dee, Culter, Stoneywood, Glentanar and Hermes.

Aberdeen also hosts the Aberdeen International Football Festival as part of the Aberdeen International Youth Festival at Seaton Park with the finals held at the Chris Anderson Stadium.

=== Aberdeen Football Club ===
Aberdeen Football Club was founded in 1903. Its major success was winning the European Cup Winners' Cup in 1983 and three Scottish Football League Premier Division titles between 1980 and 1986, under the future Manchester United manager Alex Ferguson. The club's stadium is Pittodrie, which was Britain's first all-seater stadium.

Aberdeen holds the distinction of being the last team to have won the Scottish top flight title outside the Old Firm and is the only Scottish team to have won two European trophies, having added the European Super Cup to their European Cup Winners' Cup success later in 1983. Well known footballers who have played for the club include Gordon Strachan, Alex McLeish and club legend Willie Miller. Denis Law, the joint top scorer for the Scotland national team was also born in the city, but spent his professional career playing for English and Italian clubs.

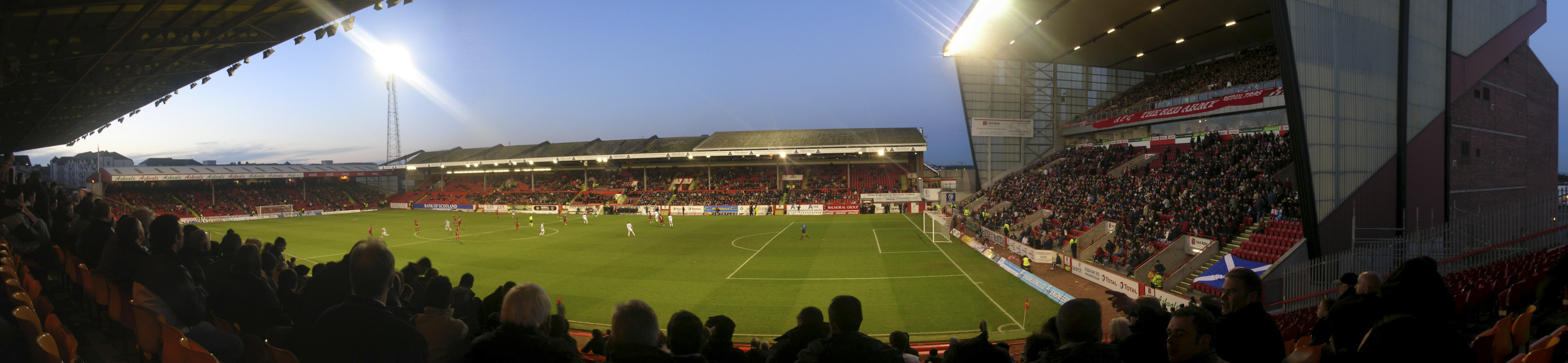
Pittodrie Stadium from the away section of the South Stand

== Golf ==
=== Public ===
Aberdeen has a number of public golf courses including:

- Auchmill
- Balnagask
- Hazlehead
- King's Links

Hazlehead Park is public-owned and has two 18-hole and pitch and putt golf courses. The No. 1 course was designed by Alistair MacKenzie, better known for designing the Augusta National.

=== Private Courses ===
Aberdeen and the immediate areas of Aberdeenshire has the following private courses:

- Cruden Bay
- Deeside Gold Club
- Murcar Links
- Mewmachar
- Royal Aberdeen

Royal Aberdeen Golf Club was founded in 1780 and used to play on the Queen's Links before moving to a new links at Balgownie, north of the River Don, in 1888. The club hosted the Senior British Open in 2005. The club also has a second course.

== Swimming ==
Aberdeen swimming team is based at Northfield Pool, the City of Aberdeen Swim Team (COAST) have been running since 1996. The team comprises several smaller swimming clubs, and has enjoyed success on all levels from North District to international. Three of the team's swimmers have qualified for the Commonwealth Games.

== Rugby Union ==
Aberdeen hosted Caledonia Reds, a Scottish rugby team, before they merged with the Glasgow Warriors in 1998. The city is also home to the Scottish Premiership Division One rugby club Aberdeen GSFP RFC who play at Rubislaw Playing Fields, and Aberdeenshire RFC which was founded in 1875 and runs Junior, Senior Men's, Senior Ladies and Touch sections from the Woodside Sports Complex and also Aberdeen Wanderers RFC. Former Wanderers' player Jason White was captain of the Scotland national rugby union team.

Aberdeenshire Rugby Football Club is based in the North of the city at Woodside Sports Complex near the Great North Road on the banks of the river Don. They currently play in the Scottish League Championship B (East), the 3rd tier of club rugby.

In 2005 the President of the SRU said it was hoped eventually to establish a professional team in Aberdeen. In November 2008 the city hosted a rugby international at Pittodrie between Scotland and Canada, with Scotland winning 41–0. In November 2010 the city once again hosted a rugby international at Pittodrie between Scotland and Samoa, with Scotland winning 19–16.

== Floorball ==
Aberdeen Oilers Floorball Club was founded in 2007. The club initially attracted a range of experienced Scandinavian and other European players who were studying in Aberdeen. Since their formation, Aberdeen Oilers have played in the British Floorball Northern League and went on to win the league in the 2008–09 season. The club played a major role in setting up a ladies league in Scotland. The Oilers' ladies team ended up second in the first ladies league season (2008–09).

== Rugby League ==
Aberdeen Warriors rugby league team previously played in the Scotland Rugby League Conference Division One, but have since disbanded. The Warriors also ran Under 15's and 17's teams. Aberdeen Grammar School won the Saltire Schools Cup in 2011.

== Other sports ==
The Chris Anderson Stadium (formerly the Aberdeen Regent Park Greyhound Stadium in Linksfield), now part of the Aberdeen Sports Village has a running track and is used for athletics, hockey and football. It also has numerous boxing gyms where the WBU lightweight champion of the world, Lee McAllister trains in the Granite City boxing club. There is also St Mary's Boxing Club, Kincorth Boxing Club and Kingswells Boxing Club. There is also a baseball team in Aberdeen called the Granite City Oilers, founded in 2013, competing in the Scottish National Baseball League.

There are two underwater hockey clubs: Aberdeen University and Reef Rats.

== Defunct sports ==
=== Greyhound racing ===
Greyhound racing was held at two venues in Aberdeen; Holburn Stadium (1933 to 1969) and Aberdeen Regent Park Greyhound Stadium (1932 to 1936).
