= List of UK student political societies =

Below is a list of political societies at UK universities, in order of age, with links to the relevant Wikipedia articles for the more notable ones.

Name	Coverage	Type	Party affiliation	Founded
Diagnostic Society of Edinburgh (as Dialectic Society)	University of Edinburgh	Debating society	All/None	1787
Cambridge Union	Cambridge University	Debating society	All/None	1815
Oxford Union	Oxford University	Debating society	All/None	1823
University College London (UCL) Union Debating Society (as Literary and Philosophical Society)	University College London	Debating society	All/None	1829
Glasgow University Liberal Democrats (as Glasgow University Liberal Club)	University of Glasgow	Political party branch	Liberal Democrats	1828
Glasgow University Conservative Association (as The Peel Club)	Glasgow University	Political party branch	Conservative	1836
Durham Union	Durham University	Debating society	All/None	1842
University of Aberdeen Debater (as King's College Debating Society)	University of Aberdeen	Debating society	All/None	1848
Queen's University Literary and Scientific Society	Queen's University Belfast	Debating society	All/None	1850
King's College London Conservative Association	King's College London	Political party branch	Conservative	1861
Glasgow University Dialectic Society	Glasgow University	Debating society	All/None	1861
Edinburgh University Conservative and Unionist Association	University of Edinburgh	Political party branch	Conservative	1862
The Union Society of King's College, London	King's College London	Debating society	All/None	1873
University of Aberdeen Conservative and Unionist Association	University of Aberdeen	Political party branch	Conservative	1881
Edinburgh University Socialist Society	University of Edinburgh	Political organisation	All/None	1884
Imperial College Debating Society	Imperial College London	Debating society	All/None	1886
Cambridge University Liberal Association (as Cambridge University Liberal Club)	Cambridge University	Political party branch	Liberal	1886
Edinburgh University Debates Union	University of Edinburgh	Debating society	All/None	1890
University of St. Andrew's Union Debating Society	University of St. Andrew's	Debating society	All/None	1890
Liberal Youth (as National League of Young Liberals)	United Kingdom	National youth wing	Liberal	1903
Cambridge Universities Labour Club (as Cambridge University Fabian Society)	Cambridge University	Political party branch	Labour	1905
Conservative Future (as Junior Imperial and Constitutional League)	United Kingdom	National youth wing	Conservative	1906
University College London (UCL) Conservative Society	University College London	Political party branch	Conservative	1908
Oxford University Liberal Democrats (as Oxford University Liberal Club)	Oxford University	Political party branch	Liberal	1913
Oxford University Labour Club	Oxford University	Political party branch	Labour	1919
Cambridge University Conservative Association	Cambridge University	Political party branch	Conservative	1921
Oxford Conservative Association (as Oxford University Conservative Association)	Oxford University	Political party branch	Conservative	1924
Glasgow University Scottish Nationalist Association	Glasgow University	Political party branch	Scottish National Party	1927
Nottingham University Conservative Association (as Nottingham University Conservative and Unionist Association)	University of Nottingham	Political party branch	Conservative	1933
Glasgow University Labour Club	Glasgow University	Political party branch	Labour	1946
Queen Mary Labour Society (as Queen Mary Labour Club)	Queen Mary, University of London	Political party branch	Labour	1947
Edinburgh University Liberal Democrats (as Edinburgh University Liberal Club)	Edinburgh University	Political party branch	Liberal	1955
University of York Conservative and Unionist Association (as University of York Conservative Association)	University of York	Political party branch	Conservative	1963
University of Warwick Conservative Association	University of Warwick	Political party branch	Conservative	1965
Warwick Politics Society	University of Warwick	Politics Society	None	1967
University of York Labour Club (UYLC)	University of York	Political party branch	Labour	1968
Labour Students (as National Organisation of Labour Students)	United Kingdom	National youth wing	Labour	1970
Oxford Hayek Society	Oxford University	Political Discussion Group	None	1983
Manchester Debating Union	Manchester University	Debating society	None/All	1996
Manchester Young Conservatives	University of Manchester, Manchester Metropolitan University, University of Salford	Political party branch	Conservative	
Communist Students (Autonomous)	United Kingdom	Political organisation	None	2006
The York Politics Society	University of York	Political organisation	All/None	2009
The Wilberforce Society	University of Cambridge	Think tank	None	2009
Warwick Think Tank Society	University of Warwick	Think tank	None	2010
King's College London Think Tank Society	King's College London	Think tank	None	2010
King's College London Labour Society	King's College London	Political Party Branch	Labour	2011
Imperial College London Conservative Association	Imperial College London	Political party branch/Political Forum	Conservative	pre-2013
York Dialectic Union (as York Union)	University of York	Debating society	None	2013
ORACLE - Political Information Forum	University of Central Lancashire	Non-partisan political organisation	None	2015
Birkbeck Politics Society	Birkbeck, University of London	Politics Society	None	2019
LJMU Political Society	Liverpool John Moores University	Politics Society	None	2019
University of Dundee Socialist Society	University of Dundee	Activist Organisation	None	2021
University of Portsmouth Left Society (as University of Portsmouth Marxist Society)	University of Portsmouth	Politics Society	None	2023
Cambridge University Left Society	University of Cambridge	Politics Society		2025
