= Aberdeen University Sports Union =

Sports union in Aberdeen, Scotland

- Institution: University of Aberdeen
- Location: Aberdeen, Scotland, UK
- Established: 1889 (as Athletics Association (AA))
- President: Emma Lister
- Vice presidents: Mustafa Özbilgehan; Nadia White
- Members: c. 13,900 total
- Affiliations: British Universities and Colleges Sport, Scottish Student Sport
- Website: http://www.ausa.org.uk

Aberdeen University Sports Union (AUSU) is the sports union at the University of Aberdeen, Scotland. It is a constituent part of Aberdeen University Students' Association. It is not responsible for facilities and rents time for its clubs from Aberdeen Sports Village.

== History ==
The Aberdeen University Athletic Association was formed in 1889 when a large group of students met at Marischal College, and created a constitution and organisation, after a rent-free sports ground had been acquired. The present-day University of Aberdeen Sports Union was created in 1999 from an amalgamation of three student bodies, to create the Aberdeen University Students' Association. At this point the ancient Athletics Association, as it was known, ceased to exist. At first the new sports body was called Sports Council but in 2002 this changed to Sports Union due to confusion over the number of councils at the university. The new body is identical in set up to its sister Aberdeen University Societies Union.

== Colours and playing strips ==
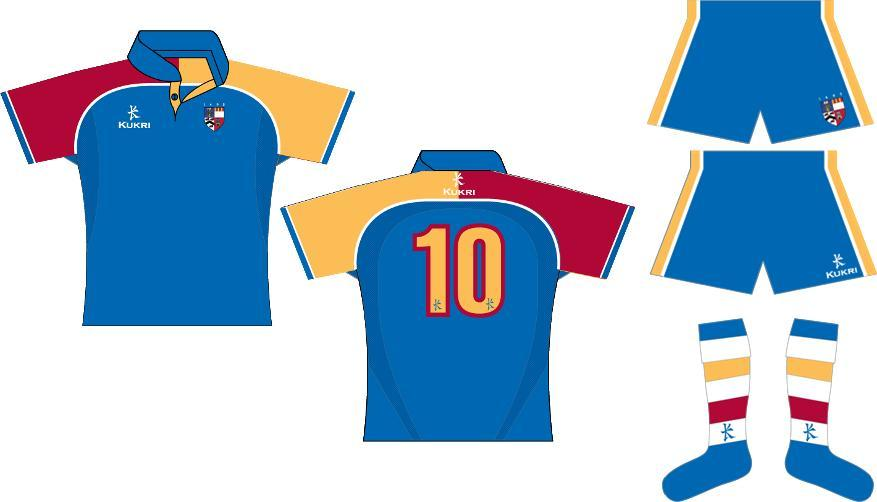
University of Aberdeen sports strips

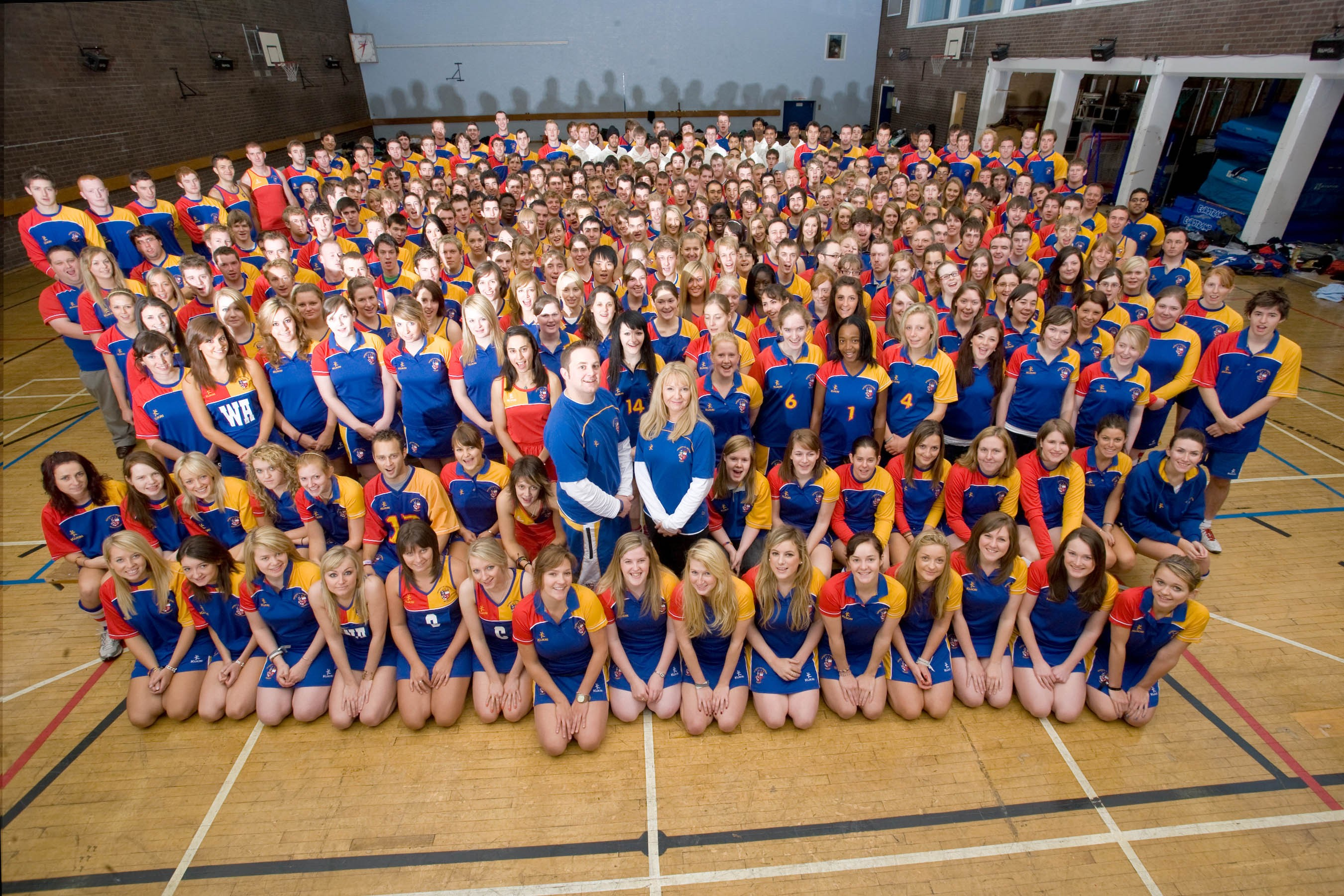
Aberdeen University Sports Union clothing launch 2008

The strip uses the four colours of the university crest - royal blue, gold, red and white. The design was based on the quarters of the university crest and the previous rugby 1st XV strips. The traditional colours of royal blue and gold had to be supplemented due to Heriot-Watt University carrying out a similar project several years previously and their colours also being royal blue and gold. The away strip was opposite with red as the main.

== Facilities ==
=== Aberdeen Sports Village ===
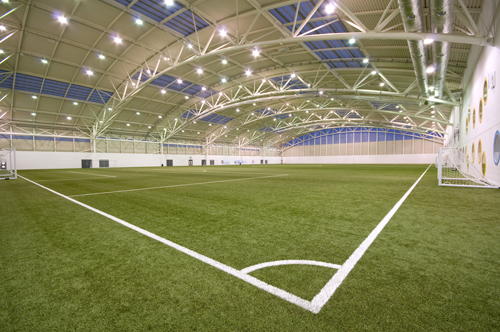
Sports Village full sized indoor football pitch

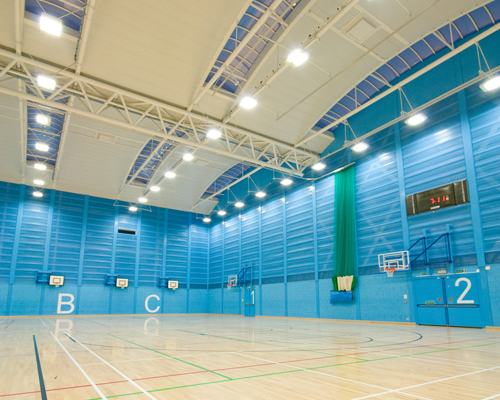
Sports Village games hall

=== King's Pavilion ===
King's Pavilion is an art deco building built in the 1930s, containing the swimming pool, performance gym, performance suite and away outdoor changing rooms.

Aberdeen University Kings Pavilion

=== Butchart Recreation Centre ===
Butchart Recreation Centre was constructed in the 1950s, where it was the sports hub of the university for over 40 years. Butchart closed its doors as a sport facility on 26 July 2009 before reopening as the Aberdeen University's Students' Association.

=== Kings Playing Fields ===
Kings Playing Fields has two rugby pitches, a cricket wicket and lacrosse pitch. Away changing is done in Kings Pavilion and home changing in Butchart Recreation Centre.

=== Hillhead Centre ===
Hillhead Centre is just up the road opposite Hillhead Halls of Residence. It houses the Grampian Institute of Sport, bar and conference suite. It has a floodlit full-size grass football pitch, currently home to Aberdeen University F.C. (and formerly home to Junior team Hillhead F.C./Bridge of Don Thistle before they moved to the village of Newburgh) and sand based floodlit full-size hockey pitch.

=== Balgownie Playing Fields ===
Balgownie Playing Fields is further up the road from the Hillhead Centre and consists of a floodlit rugby training area, club storage, bar and club room, changing rooms, flood lit running track, floodlit football pitch and football, rugby, Gaelic football and shinty playing fields.

=== Aberdeen University Boat House ===
Aberdeen University Boat House is found on the River Dee housing all the universities rowing boats.

Other facilities used by the Sports Union to house clubs include Zeste Dining Room, Hillhead Games Hall, Aberdeen City Council Altens football pitches, Aberdeen City Council Torry Games Hall and Aberdeen City Council Jesmond Games Hall.

== Clubs ==
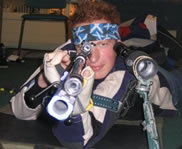
AUSU Rifle Club

University of Aberdeen Sports Union has fifty-eight affiliated clubs, the second largest in Scotland. The clubs have 99 teams who travel weekly around Scotland and Britain competing against other universities and clubs. Many tour further abroad annually.

The clubs are for social and competitive members with clubs competing in regional, Scottish Student Sport (SSS) or British Universities & College Sports (BUCS) leagues.

== Committee ==
The Sports Union Committee of 19 elected members is led by a President for Sport to coordinate the clubs, events and 3,500 Sports Union members. The President for Sport and the Sports Union Treasurer also sit on the Executive Committee of the Students' Association. The President of the Students' Association is an ex-officio member of the Sports Union Committee. The Sports Union President and Treasurer are elected as part of the Students' Association Executive Committee elections normally held in March of each year. In April 2013 Marc McCorkell was elected as President for Sport for the 2013/14 season. The rest of the Sports Union Committee elections are held as part of the AUSA Council elections, normally held in early April of each year.

=== 2016-17 Committee ===
Office	Name
President of Sport	Alice McClellan
Vice-Chair	Hugo Slater
Vice-Chair	Mustafa Özbilgehan
Blues Secretary	Georgia Fotheringham
Alumni Convener	Freya Gowans
Fundraising Convener	Hannah Blackford
Health and Fitness Convener	KJ Park
Publicity Convener	Joe Shields
Travel Convener	Laura Anderson
Welfare Convener	Eilidh Russell
Intramural Convener	Kerry Stephen
Event and Social Convener	Nadia White
Event and Social Convener	Sophie Hawksworth
Foresterhill Representative	Steven Graham-Smith
First Year Representative	Malcolm Duck

== Events ==
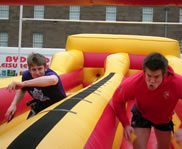
Superteams 2007

University of Aberdeen hosts some of the largest university events in Scotland. These range from those for the avid university sports person to providing a fun day for students.

=== Superteams ===
Superteams is normally the second weekend of March and is one of the flagship events attracting approximately 480 students to compete and 60 student volunteers. It is the largest one-day event of its kind in Scotland. The event is made up of teams of seven with no more than four from the opposite sex, the team must also nominate a Superman and Superwoman. This is separated into many bases, some of which over the years have included; Go-Karting, Abseiling, Tug of war, Sprints, Sumo Wrestling, Bungee Runs, Paintballing and Orienteering.

=== Blues Ball ===
The Sports Blues Ball is traditionally the first Thursday in February and it the annual recognition of sporting achievement at the university where the five Sports Trophies are awarded along with the Blues. It is the largest all seated sports ball in Scotland. Guest speakers have included Jimmy Hill, Jason White, Ally McCoist, Clive Tyldesley, Doddie Weir, Gordon Smith and Chris Cusiter and Tim Baillie.

=== Aberdeen Boat Race ===
The annual boat race between University of Aberdeen and Robert Gordon University has been competed for since 1996. The University of Aberdeen has lost only eight times, in 2006, 2009, 2012, 2013, 2014, 2015, 2016 and 2018. Aberdeen Asset Management sponsor the event.

=== Granite City Challenge ===
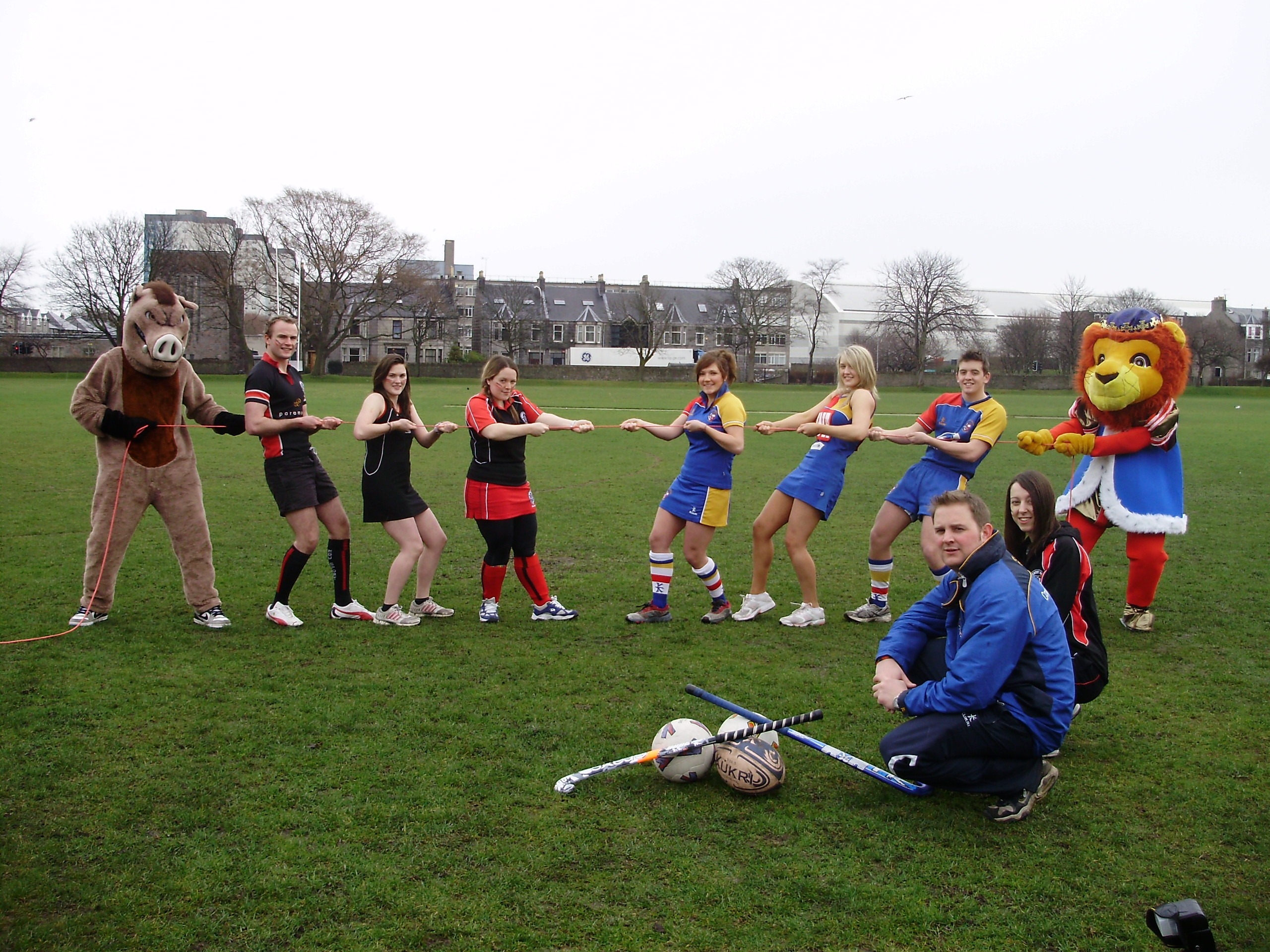
Aberdeen University Granite City Challenge

One of the largest varsity events in Britain competed annually in the week before the Easter holidays in March. All sports are competed for on the Wednesday of the week. Since its conception in 1996 University of Aberdeen have only been beaten once by their city rivals Robert Gordon University, in 2008.

=== Kings Football Sixes ===
Aberdeen University Football Club is older than Aberdeen F.C. formed in 1889. The success of the rugby sevens is rivalled by that of the football and is normally the weekend after the rugby.

=== Kings Rugby Sevens ===
Boasting one of the oldest rugby teams in the world, formed in 1875, the university also hosts one of the largest university rugby events in Scotland. The tournament is usually hosted on the last weekend of April or the first weekend after the Easter holidays.

== Intra-Mural ==
University of Aberdeen has a strong tradition of intramural sport with a high standard found in four football leagues all of ten teams, two are eleven-a-side leagues played at the Aultons Council pitches, one is a six-a-side league played on the Cage at Kings and one is a seven-a-side league in the Aberdeen Sports Village, the title of which is held by Iain Proudfoot's Village Army.

All leagues together combined bring together upwards of 650 students weekly - the second largest intramural programme in Scotland.

== International representation ==
The University of Aberdeen has boasted many athletes of international significance during its history. This can be seen in team sports such as the Aberdeen University Rugby Football Club with Scotland and British and Irish Lions representation.

== Affiliations ==
=== British University & College Sport (BUCS) ===
The University of Aberdeen affiliates to BUCS annually. BUCS is responsible for the organisation of the majority of university sport and claims to set more sports fixtures than any other sports organisation in Europe. Every sport that is recognised by BUCS is allocated points. These are compiled and at the end of the season all institutions are ranked for sport.

=== Scottish Student Sport (SSS) ===
The University of Aberdeen affiliates to Scottish Student Sport annually. SSS runs a lot of the sports events and fixtures on behalf of BUCS in Scotland, in particular the British University Games (BUCS). SSS also takes responsibility for a lot of the sports BUCS does not recognise such as rifle, shinty, Gaelic football and curling.

== See also ==
- Aberdeen University Men's Football Club
- The Lairig Club Climbing
- Aberdeen University Rifle Club
- Aberdeen University Rugby Football Club
- Aberdeen University Shinty Club
