= Aberdeen Stadium =

Aberdeen Stadium may refer to:

- Aberdeen Regent Park Greyhound Stadium, a former greyhound stadium and now the Chris Anderson Stadium
- Holburn Stadium (also known as Aberdeen Greyhound Stadium), a former greyhound racing stadium from 1933 to 1969
- Pittodrie Stadium, an all-seater stadium in Aberdeen, primarily for football and home of Aberdeen F.C.
- Proposed Aberdeen stadium, a football stadium under construction in Kingswells, called Kingsford Stadium
