= University of Aberdeen Conservative and Unionist Association =

Aberdeen University Conservative and Unionist Association
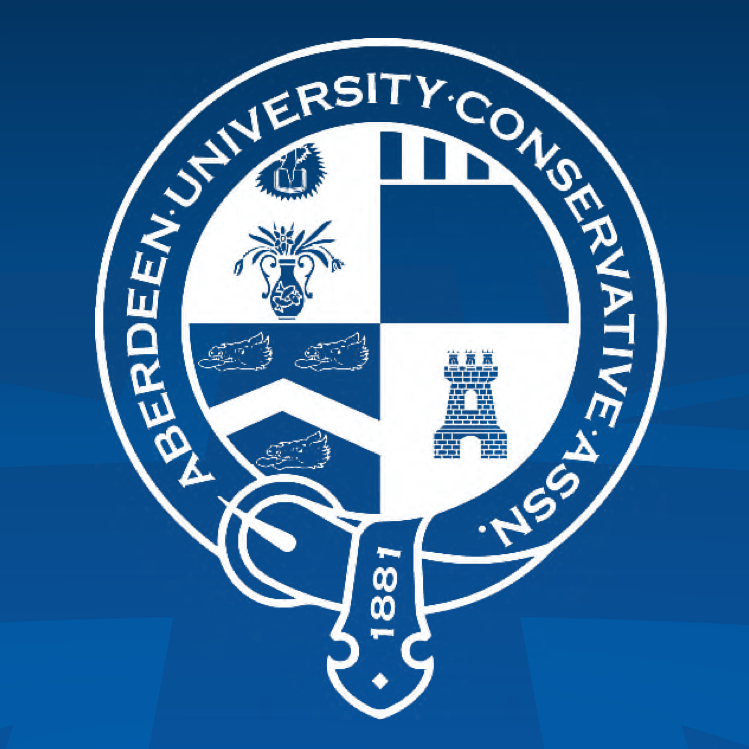
- Abbreviation: AUCUA
- Formation: 1881
- Type: Political Association
- Location: Aberdeen, Scotland
- Chairman: Cameron McPhail
- Honorary President: Andrew Bowie MP
- Main organ: Executive Council
- Affiliations: Aberdeen University Students' Association
- Website: https://www.ausa.org.uk/societies/society/aucua

The Aberdeen University Conservative and Unionist Association (AUCUA) is a student Conservative association formed in 1881. It is the third oldest Conservative student association in the United Kingdom. AUCUA is the largest political association at the University of Aberdeen.

It consists of an executive committee that consists of six positions where members are elected annually at the association's AGM. It is directly affiliated to the Aberdeen University Students' Association and provides support to the Scottish Conservative and Unionist Party.

== Notable former members ==
- Michael Bowes-Lyon (18th Earl of Strathmore and Kinghorne) - Former Deputy Chief Whip of the House of Lords.
- Andrew Bowie MP - Member of Parliament for West Aberdeenshire and Kincardine and former Deputy Chair of the Conservative Party.
- Derek Brownlee - Former MSP for South of Scotland (Scottish Parliament electoral region) and member of the Advisory Board of Reform Scotland.
- Dr Eamonn Butler - Co-founder of the Adam Smith Institute.
- Finlay Carson MSP- Member of the Scottish Parliament for Galloway and West Dumfries and Convener of the Rural Affairs, Islands and Natural Environment Committee.
- James Cran - Former Member of Parliament for Beverley and Shadow Deputy Leader of the House.
- Murdo Fraser MSP – Member of the Scottish Parliament for Mid Scotland and Fife and Shadow Cabinet Secretary for Business, Economic Growth and Tourism.
- Kirstene Hair - Former MP for Angus.
- David Maclean (Lord Blencathra) - Member of the House of Lords, former Member of Parliament for the Penrith constituency, Minister of State for Home Affairs, Minister of State for the Environment and Countryside and Chief Whip of the Conservative Party.
- Dr Nanette Milne - Former Member of the Scottish Parliament for North East Scotland.
- Ross Thomson - Former Member of Parliament for Aberdeen South and former Member of the Scottish Parliament for North East Scotland.
- Dr David Torrance – Author, contemporary historian, freelance political journalist.
- Paul Wheelhouse - Former Scottish National Party Member of the Scottish Parliament for South Scotland and Scottish Government Minister for Energy, Connectivity and the Islands.

== Current Committee ==
Below are the members of the 145th committee.

- Chairman - Cameron McPhail
- Deputy Chairman - Henry Carre
- Chancellor - Paul Anderson
- Secretary - Sean Cameron
- Social & Welfare Officer - Charlotte Lanham
- Party Relations Officer - TBC

== Chairmen ==
According to the Association's constitution, the head of the Association is called the Chairman.

- 2026/Present - Cameron McPhail
- 2025/26 - Cameron McPhail
- 2024/25 - Henry Carre
- Jan 2024/Mar 24 - Shane Painter (Interim)
- Mar 2023/Dec 23 - Haytham Alrifai
- 2022/23 - Eitan Godsi/Marco Oosthuizen
- 2021/22 - Nestor Carlsen-Devereux
- 2020/21 - Rami Jerrow
- 2019/20 - Joshua Mills
- 2018/19 - Gavin MacKenzie
- 2017/18 - Emma Farquhar
- 2016/17 - Emma Farquhar
- 2015/16 - Alexander McNab
- 2014/15 - Nicholas Layden
- 2013/14 - Nicholas Layden
- 2012/13 - Andrew Bowie
- 2011/12 - Declan Pang
- 2010/11 - Duncan Stewart
- 2009/10 - Andrea Sharpe
- 2008/09 - Oliver Lash-Williams
- 2007/08 - Leslie K. Clark
- 2006/07 - Tobias Lebmann
- 2005/06 - Tobias Lehmann
- 2004/05 - Frank Webster
- 2001/02 - James Ashton
- 2000/01 - Alan Martin
- 1999/00 - Philip Atkinson
- 1998/99 - Louis Darrant
- 1997/98 - Paul Dickson
- 1985/86 - Murdo Fraser

== Media ==
Members of the association have, in recent years, been interviewed by various news outlets such as euronews, Sky News and BBC Newsnight. They also maintain an active relationship with the Aberdeen University Student Newspaper The Gaudie and regularly provide speakers to the Aberdeen Student Radio for discussion and debate.

== See also ==
- Scottish Young Conservatives
