= Janan Ganesh =

British journalist and political commentator (born 1982)

- Born: February 1982 (age 44); Nigeria
- Education: University of Warwick; University College London
- Occupation: Journalist
- Employers: The Economist (2007–2012); Financial Times (2012–present)

Janan Ganesh (born February 1982) is a British journalist, author and political commentator. Ganesh is a biweekly columnist for the Financial Times. He writes on international politics for the FT and culture for FT Weekend.

== Background ==
Ganesh was born in Nigeria. He attended Stanley Technical School for Boys, a voluntary aided school in South London. He studied politics at the University of Warwick, where he was president of the Politics Society, and then public policy at University College London.

Ganesh was active in Labour Students, the student wing of the Labour Party, having been inspired to join when he was 17 by Tony Blair's 1999 annual Labour Party Conference speech. In a 2001 interview with The Guardian, Ganesh described himself as "essentially a Portillista", indicating views the newspaper described as "liberal on social affairs, centre-right on economics". Ganesh opted not to attend his local constituency Labour Party meetings as they were "too dominated by Trots".

== Career ==
For two years, Ganesh was a researcher at Policy Exchange, a Westminster-based think tank on the political right set up by Conservative MPs Nick Boles, Michael Gove and Francis Maude. He was political correspondent for The Economist from 2007 to 2012, before joining the Financial Times. From 2012 to 2018, Ganesh wrote for the Financial Times as a columnist on British politics. In early 2018, he relocated to Washington, D.C. to write about American politics for the same publication. He later moved to Los Angeles before returning to London in 2022.

Between 2013 and 2017, Ganesh regularly appeared on the BBC show Sunday Politics.

Ganesh co-authored Compassionate Conservatism (2006) with Jesse Norman, which received the T. E. Utley Memorial Prize for young journalists. He is the author of George Osborne: The Austerity Chancellor (2012), a biography of British Chancellor of the Exchequer, George Osborne.
