= 2015 Scottish Rugby U-20 Championship =

- Countries: Scotland
- Date: August – October 2015
- Champions: Edinburgh U20
- Runners-up: West U20
- Matches played: 5

The 2015 Scottish Rugby U-20 Championship will be contested from August – October 2015. The tournament is run by the Scottish Rugby Union and will be competed for by the 4 regional teams from the BT Sport Scottish Rugby Academy.

The U-20 Championship is three rounds of the regional round-robin, which takes in the autumn, and concludes with a final in October.

== Teams ==
The following teams took part in the inaugural 2015 Scottish Rugby U-20 Championship:

2015 Scottish Rugby U-20 Championship
Team Name	Ground
Caledonia U20	Hillhead, Aberdeen
Edinburgh U20	Napier University, Edinburgh
West U20	Broadwood Stadium, Cumbernauld
Borders U20	Netherdale, Galashiels

== Standings ==
The round robin standings for the 2015 Scottish Rugby U-20 Championship were:

2015 Scottish Rugby U-20 Championship
Pos	Team	P	W	D	L	PF	PA	PD	TB	LB	Pts
1	West U20	3	3	0	0	110	50	+60	2	0	14
2	Edinburgh U20	3	2	0	1	113	55	+58	2	0	11
3	Caledonia U20	3	1	0	2	82	94	-12	0	0	5
4	Borders U20	3	0	0	2	32	138	−106	0	0	0

=== Round-by-round ===
The table below shows each team's progression throughout the season. For each round, their cumulative points total is shown with the overall log position in brackets:

Team Progression – 2015 Scottish Rugby U-20 Championship
Team	R1	R2	R3
Caledonia U20	0 (4th)	0 (3rd)	5 (3rd)
Edinburgh U20	5 (2nd)	10 (2nd)	14 (1st)
West U20	5 (1st)	10 (1st)	11 (2nd)
Borders U20	0 (3rd)	0 (4th)	0 (4th)
Key:	win	draw	loss

== Fixtures and results ==
The following matches were played in the 2015 Scottish Rugby U-20 Championship:

- All times are GMT.

=== Round One ===
9 Aug 2015	Edinburgh U20	19-34	Edinburgh U20	Broadwood Stadium, Cumbernauld
17:00

9 Aug 2015	West U20	39-15	Caledonia U20	Broadwood Stadium, Cumbernauld
18:30

=== Round Two ===
14 Aug 2015	West U20	53-10	Caledonia U20	Burnbrae, Glasgow
18:00

14 Aug 2015	Edinburgh U20	53-17	Borders U20	Burnbrae, Glasgow
19:30

=== Round Three ===
23 Aug 2015	Edinburgh U20	23-21	West U20	Kings Park, Aberdeen
13:00

23 Aug 2015	Caledonia U20	46 - 7	Borders U20	Kings Park, Aberdeen
14:45

== Finals ==
=== Champions final ===
Sunday 11 October
16:45

Edinburgh U20	48-14	West U20
Try: Shiel, Miller, Gray, Willis, Jack, Greig, Crosbie, Ben Appleson	Report	Try: Preston; Pen: Henderson (4)

Murrayfield Stadium, Edinburgh

FB	15	Blair Kinghorn
RW	14	Ross McCann
OC	13	Ally Greig
IC	12	Cameron Gray
LW	11	Saul Melvin-Farr
FH	10	Ali Davidson
SH	9	Hugh Fraser
N8	8	Ally Miller
BF	7	Scott Burnside
OF	6	Jamie Ritchie (c)
RL	5	Hamish Bain
LL	4	Callum Hunter-Hill
TP	3	Craig Stewart
HK	2	Craig Willis
LP	1	Dan Elkington
Replacements:
HK	16	Malcolm Jack
PR	17	Mark Latta
PR	18	Cameron McLellan-Watt
LK	19	Luke Crosbie
FL	20	Thomas Gordon
SH	21	Charlie Shiel
FH	22	Andrew Manson
WG	23	Robert Kay

FB	15	Josh Henderson
RW	14	James Couper
OC	13	Charlie Lonergan
IC	12	Max MacFarlane
LW	11	Graeme Docherty
FH	10	Andrew Goudie
SH	9	Jack Preston
N8	8	Matt Smith
OF	7	Angus Neilson
BF	6	Michael Dewar
RL	5	Lee Scott
LL	4	Calum Braid
TP	3	Cameron Taylor
HK	2	Lewis Anderson
LP	1	Lyall Archer
Replacements:
HK	16	Ruraidh Sayce
PR	17	Erik Cavan
PR	18	Darren Allen
LK	19	Adam Nichol
N8	20	Walker Graham
SH	21	Andrew Simmers
CE	22	John McCorkindale
WG	23	Sam Graham

=== Third place final ===
Sunday 11 October
13:00

Borders U20	46-17	Caledonia U20
	Report

Murrayfield Stadium, Edinburgh

FB	15	Ruairi Howarth
RW	14	Alec McKay
OC	13	George Taylor
IC	12	Matt McPhilips
LW	11	Gavin Wood
FH	10	Tom Galbraith
SH	9	Arthur Sinclair
N8	8	Stephen Ainslie
BF	7	Andrew Grant-Suttie
OF	6	Stuart Allison
RL	5	William Brown
LL	4	Reece Wishart
TP	3	Blair Robertson
HK	2	Fraser Renwick
LP	1	Mike Morrison
Replacements:
HK	16	Grant Paxton
PR	17	Ben Christie
PR	18	Neil Turnbull
LK	19	Thomas Hamilton
FL	20	Sean Chapman
SH	21	Thomas Klein
FH	22	Robbie Chalmers
WG	23	Fin Graham

FB	15	Jacob Adamson (c)
RW	14	Liam Cousins
OC	13	Paul Ritch
IC	12	Rhys Thomson
LW	11	Jamie Batho
FH	10	Ewan Fox
SH	9	Fionn Call
N8	8	Declan O'Brien
OF	7	Chris Jollands
BF	6	Duncan Wither
RL	5	Ewan Stewart
LL	4	Hamilton Burr
TP	3	Owen Jackson
HK	2	Matthew Emmison
LP	1	Lewis Skinner
Replacements:
HK	16	Fergus McKenzie
PR	17	Adam Thomson
PR	18	Daniel Dineen
LK	19	James Pow
N8	20	Richard Winton
SH	21	Henry Sampson
CE	22	Lorne Christie
