= The Lairig Club =

Mountaineering club in Scotland

- Established: 1940
- Founders: W. T. Hendry
- Founded at: University of Aberdeen
- Type: Mountaineering Club
- Legal status: University Organisation
- Purpose: "To give the opportunity to participate in, and develop the skills for, safe mountaineering in all conditions."
- Location: University of Aberdeen Sports Union, Aberdeen Sports Village, Linksfield Road, Aberdeen, AB24 5RU
- Members: ~100
- Website: www.ausa.org.uk/sports/club/lairig/

The Lairig Club, commonly referred to as "The Lairig" is the University of Aberdeen's Mountaineering Club and was founded in the early 1940s. Members take part in a wide range of activities from hillwalking and sport climbing right through to winter climbing, Ski touring and alpinism. Due to the university calendar and its close proximity to reliable venues winter mountaineering is the main focus of the club along with hillwalking. Over the winter season the club prides itself as being one of the most active university mountaineering clubs in the UK and works with the mission statement: "To give the opportunity to participate in, and develop the skills for, safe mountaineering in all conditions." The club has a long and distinguished history painted by famous names such as Tom Patey and Andy Nisbet, two of Scotland's most prolific new routers, who learnt their trade in the Lairig.

== History ==
The club was founded in 1940.

=== The "Golden Age" of the Lairig Club ===
For a period of time during the 1950s the Lairig Club was at the forefront of Scottish winter climbing with members setting new standards and developing new techniques in the sport. The Lairig along with other Aberdeen-based clubs; The Cairngorm Club and the Etchachan Club were responsible for the development and first ascents of most major venues and routes in the Eastern Cairngorms. The most active club members of this time were local Aberdonians Bill Brooker, Tom Patey, James Mike Taylor, Ken Grassick and Graeme Nicol.

Notable achievements by the Lairig Club during this era include: Patey and Gordon Leslie's ascent of Douglas-Gibson Gully on Lochnagar in 1950, the first winter grade V climb in Scotland. In June 1952 eight club members made an en masse first summer ascent of Parallel Gully B, the last of the major gullies to be climbed on Lochnagar. Another Lairig meet in the December of that year saw the first ascent of The Scorpion another early grade V on Carn Etchachan by Patey, Taylor, Grassick and Nicol. First winter ascents of Mitre Ridge on Beinn a' Bhuird (V,6) by Brooker and Patey and Eagle Ridge (VI,6) on Lochnagar in four and a half hours by Brooker, Patey and Taylor proved that the Lairig really were at the head of their game. Even today with modern equipment and techniques these routes are still well respected and serious lines. Other than the first ascent of Raven's Gully in Glencoe by Hamish MacInnes and Chris Bonington in 1953 all the grade V routes in Scotland were confined to the Lairig's stomping ground of the Eastern Cairngorms in the early 1950s. Lairig members Patey and Nicol teamed up with Hamish MacInnes to climb the first grade V on Ben Nevis, in the form of the much prized first ascent of Zero Gully.

Activity was not just limited to the high mountain cliffs and the club were also responsible for the early development of the North East sea cliffs. Several routes put up by Lairig members are now graded VS and above. The Sickle HVS 5b was climbed in 1944 by founding member W. T. Hendry and marked a huge advance in rock climbing standards. Routes such as Brooker's Arete and Nicol's Eliminate give clues as to who was behind most of the new routing in the 1950s.

In 1966, the Lairig Club constructed a bothy refuge in the Garbh Choire complex, facilitating access to nearby ice climbing routes. The refuge, originally built about 50 years ago by the club, is now under the care of the Mountain Bothies Association, following a restoration in 2018. In 1967, a cottage on the Balmoral estate at Allt na Giubhsaich was let out to the University of Aberdeen for use by the Lairig club.

Throughout the period the club flourished, attracting students from the University who all shared a common love of the hills. Trips were organised every weekend to bothies in the North East such as Bob Scott's, Corrour and the Glas-allt-Shiel and occasionally a bit further afield. "A good day in the hills was just as important as a good evening back at the bothy with good friends" and this is still very much the ethos of the Lairig Club to this day.

== The Cooper Memorial Race ==
=== Death of Graeme Cooper and Richard Hardy ===
On 19 November 2006, Richard Hardy, 18, and Graeme Cooper, 23, tragically lost their lives whilst they were returning from a climb in the Coire an t-Sneachda area. They were part of a group of 10 other mountaineers from the Lairig who went away that weekend on a trip to the Cairngorms. Hardy and Cooper, left their group to climb a winter route by themselves, but the weather quickly deteriorated with winds of up to 120 mph and temperatures of -20C. The other group returned to the carpark at 8.30pm and went back to their accommodation, but the pair had not returned or responded to their mobile phones so the action was taken to call the emergency services at 10.30pm. The pair were found buried in snow the following day, approximately 10 minutes walk from the Cairngorm Ski Area car park and airlifted to the nearby Raigmore Hospital in Inverness. Neither could be saved, Hardy was found "frozen, unresponsive and unrousable". Their death was put down to lack of experience and preparedness.

A 1-minute silence was held throughout the University of Aberdeen in their honour.

=== The Cooper Memorial Race ===
An annual running race around Loch Muick is organised by the club to honour their memory and to help raise money for Cairngorm Mountain Rescue.

The race starts at Allt na Guibhsaich Lodge, before heading down to the boathouse in the northernmost corner of the Loch. From here, a clockwise lap of the loch is ran, before returning to the boathouse. Upon return to the boathouse, all racers are required to jump into the loch and drink a can of either Tennants or Irn-Bru before continuing back up to the finish line at Allt na Guibhsaich Lodge.

The course is approximately 12.4km long

== Committee ==
Membership of the club is open to all students who are members of the University of Aberdeen Sports Council. The club is run by a committee of senior members who are elected at the annual general meeting and serve for one academic year.

== Affiliations ==
Lairig Club is a full member of Aberdeen University Sports Union.

The club is also registered and affiliated with Mountaineering Scotland

== Notable Members ==
- Bill Brooker
- Tom Patey
- James Mike Taylor
- Ken Grassick
- Graeme Nicol
- W. T. Hendry
- Simon Thirgood
- Andy Wightman
