= AUSU =

AUSU may refer to:

- Aberdeen University Sports Union
- Algoma University Students' Union
- Athabasca University Students' Union
