= The Gaudie =

Student-run newspaper at the University of Aberdeen

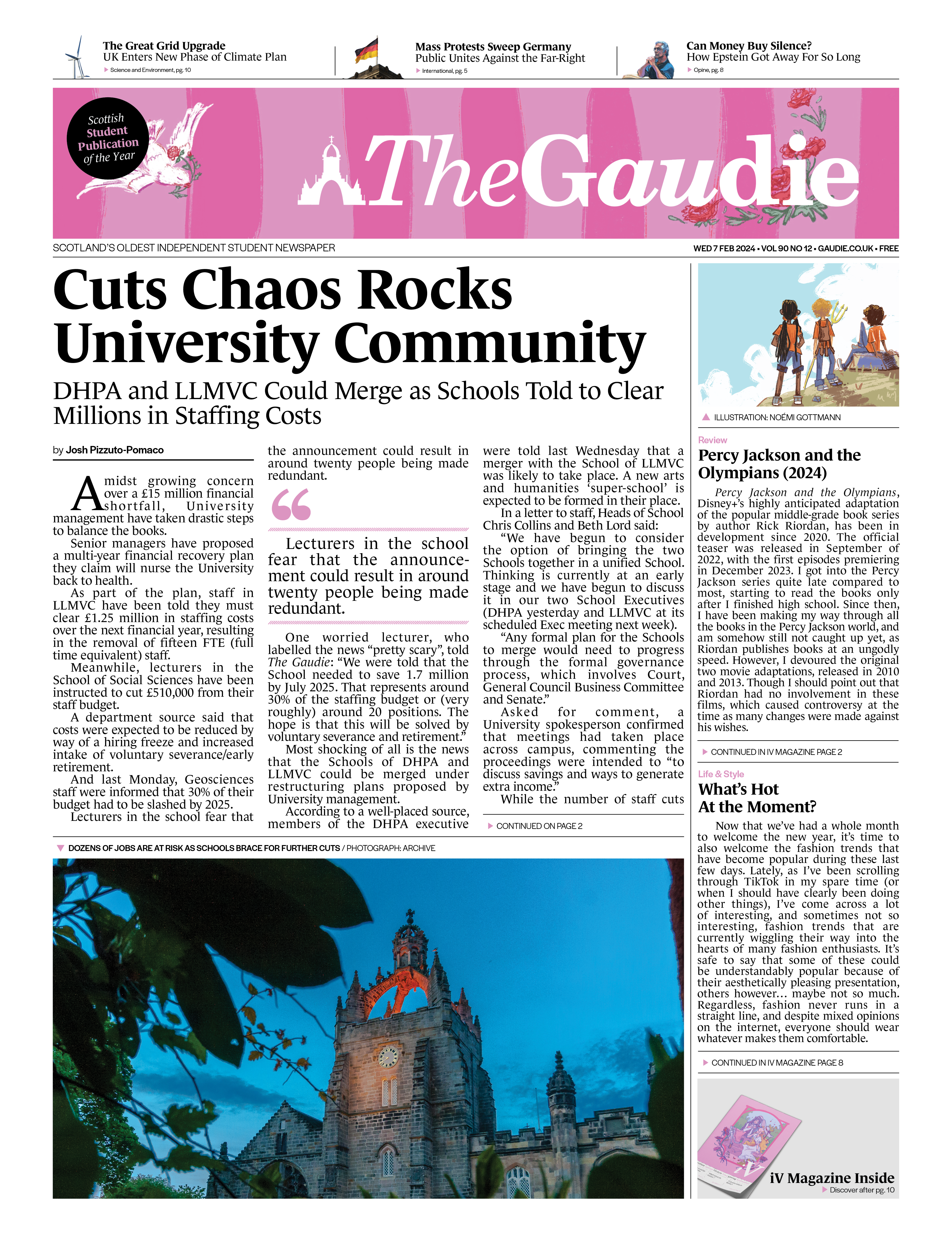
- Front page on 7 February 2024
- Type: Fortnightly during Aberdeen University term time
- School: University of Aberdeen
- Editor-in-chief: Amelia Boag & Emily Reid
- Founded: 1934
- Language: English
- Headquarters: Students' Union Building, Elphinstone Road Aberdeen
- City: Aberdeen
- Price: Free
- Website: www.gaudie.co.uk
- Free online archives: The Gaudie ePaper

The Gaudie is a student newspaper at the University of Aberdeen (UoA) covering campus and local news. It is the oldest independent student newspaper in Scotland according to The Guardian, being in circulation since 1934. It is available free of charge across the Old Aberdeen and Foresterhill campuses. It aims to print unbiased, student-focused articles.

The Gaudie was funded by Aberdeen University Students' Association, University of Aberdeen Development Trust, and advertising revenue, but has recently been forced to rely on donations. It usually consists of 28 pages split into News, Features, Science and Environment, Opine, International, Puzzles, Satire, Life and Style, Arts, and Sports.

As the transition from print to digital media has increased in recent years, The Gaudie has invested significant development in its online presence, with nearly 24,000 visitors from over 70 countries in one year.

The Gaudie continues to release fortnightly print editions, which consist of 400 papers distributed across campus.

All UoA students are invited to submit articles for the various sections.

== History ==
The Gaudie was first released in 1934 as a weekly student paper, originally at a price of one penny. It is recognised as one of the oldest student newspapers in Scotland and the United Kingdom, and in 2003 was stated as the oldest in Scotland by The Guardian. It has been produced by Aberdeen students since its inception in 1934. It appeared in the press in 2003 when the then editorial team resigned in protest over attempts by Aberdeen University Students' Association to enforce content and restrict the budget and print run.

Since 2009, the paper has successfully re-established itself around the King's College Campus, and Foresterhill. The paper has a number of notable past writers and editors including Alistair Darling and David Torrance.

=== 2003: Resignation controversy ===
In 2003, there was outrage over attempts by the Aberdeen University Students' Association (AUSA) to enforce content on the editorial team. AUSA believed that as the Students' Association paid for the paper, they were entitled to advertise the Association and its endeavours. Led by Mark Lindley-Highfield, the entire editorial team of the paper resigned. The issue was taken to Parliament by the MP for Shetland and Orkney, criticizing the Students' Association's "ill-advised move".

=== 2009-12: Redesign ===
Between 2009 and 2012, The Gaudie was completely redesigned under the tenure of Editors Joe Blyth, Anne-Claire Deseilligny, and, apparently, James Valentine to have a more consistent look throughout the whole paper. Once more, inspiration was taken from major British newspapers, not in the least from The Guardian.

The paper was redesigned to have similar looking mastheads for all sections, except for the Arts and Culture magazine IV, which is part of The Gaudie as a whole. Section colours, which had been previously used for all sections, were gotten rid of. The newly designed mastheads were made to mirror the window pattern of the Sir Duncan Rice Library, an important landmark of Old Aberdeen.

The newspaper was deemed the best student newspaper in Scotland by the Student Publication Association in 2024, and won 'Best Design' and 'Best Use of Digital Media' at The Herald Student Press Awards in 2025.

=== Recent reporting ===
Recent years have featured a range of investigative reporting, including an investigation (subsequently published in The Times and The Press and Journal) which uncovered the university's collection of 'stolen' indigenous human remains.

Other reporting has focused on the university's increased recruitment of international students, the university's response to COVID-19, and coverage of candidate misconduct in the Aberdeen University Student's Association sabbatical officer elections.

The story "Controversy as students lead protests outside asylum seeker accommodation" was picked up by national media. The student paper's coverage won 'best article' at the 2026 Student Publication Association Regional Conference in Scotland.

Ahead of the 2026 Scottish Parliament election, The Gaudie hosted a hustings for local candidates, where the declared Reform UK candidate Dr Jordan Brown announced he would not stand in the election.

=== Podcast ===
Gettin' Rowdy with The Gaudie is the newspaper's flagship podcast founded in 2020. It was nominated for the Political Podcast Awards 2026. Kirsty Blackman MP submitted an Early day motion to congratulate The Gaudie for its nomination.

=== Funding crisis ===
In 2023, The Gaudie launched a fundraiser after identifying a budget deficit ahead of its 90th anniversary. In October 2025, The Gaudie launched another fundraising appeal to keep the newspaper in print following funding cuts and increased operational costs.

Following this, DC Thompson reduced printing costs for the publication in a sponsorship which includes a full-page advertisement for The Press & Journal in each print edition of The Gaudie.

=== Students' Union interference ===
In 2026, AUSA imposed a policy allowing staff to sanction editors for publishing articles causing embarrassment to the union.

== Gaudie alumni ==
Notable past writers and editors including Alistair Darling and David Torrance.

Josh Pizzuto-Pomaco, co-EiC in '23/24, works as Edinburgh correspondent for The Herald. Beth Templeton, a former writer, works for The National and The New Feminist. Rory Buccheri, a senior section editor '22/23, went on to work as a freelance food and travel writer for national publications, while Anttoni James Numminen, co-EiC in '22/23, became a BBC-funded Local Democracy reporter in Yorkshire.

Julie Adams, a former Gaudie features editor, became a teacher and published author. Rob Littlejohn works as Editor for Scottish Parliament Official Report. Eoin Smith works as magician, writer and presenter.
