= Aberdeen University Students' Association =

Scottish students' union

- Institution: University of Aberdeen
- Location: Aberdeen, Scotland, UK
- Established: 1889 (as SRC)
- President: Kaitlin Agius
- CEO: Fiona Heinonen
- Vice presidents: Olivia Demonstranti (Welfare), Courage Mene (Education), Mitalee Suchak (Communities), Hannah Cowie (Activities)
- Members: 16,611
- Affiliations: National Union of Students, British Universities and Colleges Sport (BUCS), Scottish Student Sport (SSS)
- Website: www.ausa.org.uk

Aberdeen University Students' Association (often referred to as AUSA) is the students' association of the University of Aberdeen, an ancient university in the city of Aberdeen in North East Scotland. It organises recreational activities, including the fresher's fair; provides welfare and advice services for students; promotes equality and diversity of students; advancement of education; and provide facilities and support for student groups, forums, societies and sports clubs. In 2014, AUSA had around 14,000 members. In 2025, AUSA has around 16,000 members. All registered students at the University of Aberdeen are automatically enrolled as members of the Union.

== History ==
For almost 100 years, representation of students was carried out, in common with the other ancient universities in Scotland, by a students' representative council (SRC). While this remains the official name of the body created by the Universities (Scotland) Act 1889, the Students' Association opted to use the term Students' Association Council to describe it and today goes by Student Council when organising elections and referring to itself to the student body.

This follows significant structural changes to the Students' Association which began in the late 1990s. Previously AUSA stood for Aberdeen University Students' Assembly, and within it there were four bodies with distinct identities and management: the SRC (based at Luthuli House, located next to King's College, and supporting activities including educational support, welfare, political campaigning, and societies); the Students' Union (in the form of a prize-winning social venue at Broad Street in the city centre, including two bars, two night clubs, games facilities, shops, and offices); the Athletics Association (based at the Butchart Recreation Centre, Old Aberdeen); and Debater (the debating society, based with the SRC in Luthuli House). Following the changes at the turn of the millennium which formally created AUSA as it is known today, the AA became known as the Sports Union.

=== Sites ===
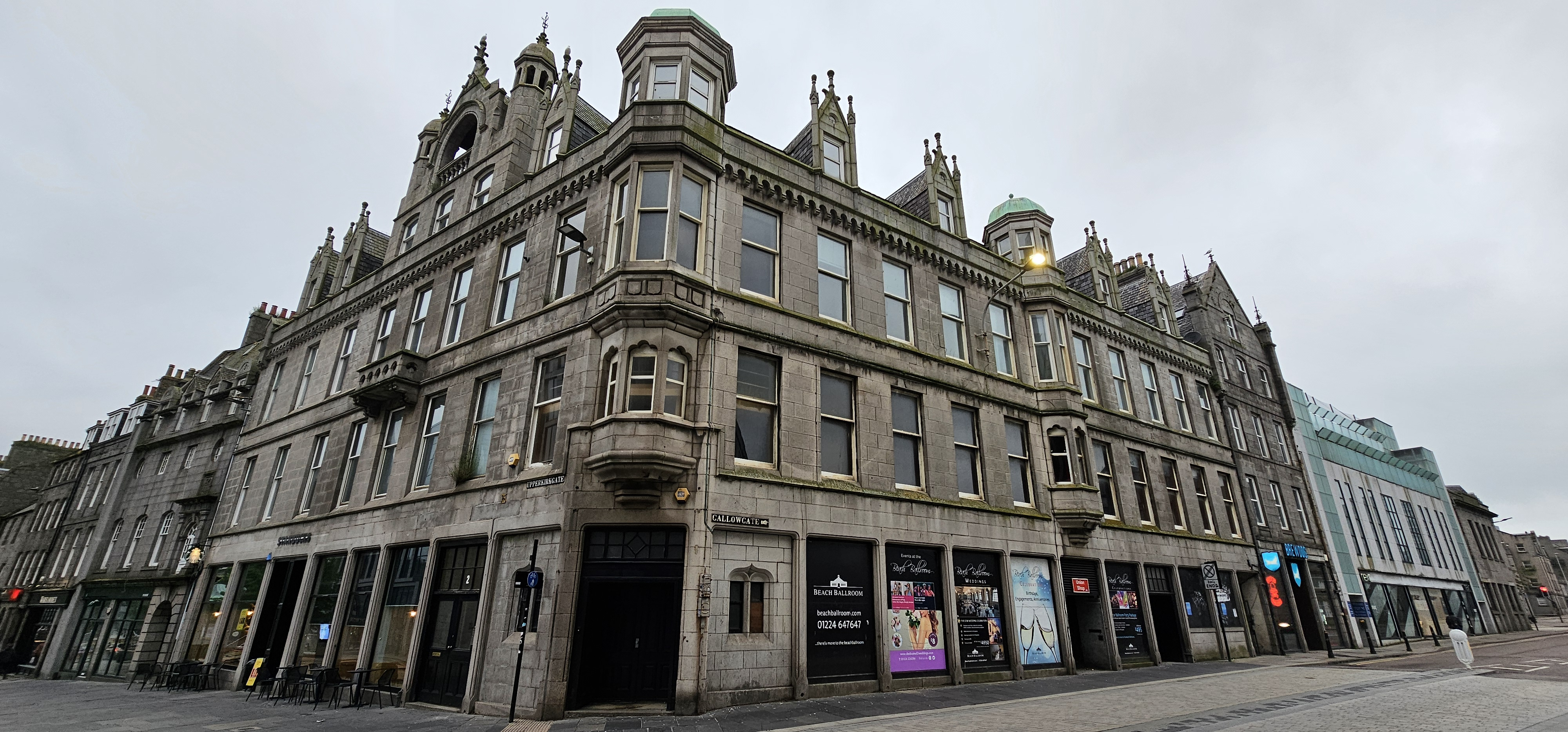
The former student union at 11 Gallowgate

in 1939, a new student union was opened on Broad Street, the first in Scotland to merge the men's and women's unions (the men's union had previously been located at Marischal College, and the women's at Skene Terrace). The building was bought by the university in 1929, and work began in 1934, but it was delayed by a tenant who refused to leave, eventually leading to a court case, with the university agreeing to cover his removal fees. It finally opened on 25 January 1939, unveiled by the university principal Hamilton Fyfe. The building was notable for a series of large murals created by Robert Sivell in the concert hall (later to become a wine bar).

Due to financial pressures, this building was forced to close in early 2004. Now owned by the Bon Accord Centre, the old union building which houses significant murals by Robert Sivell is at risk. The Friends of the Sivell Murals Aberdeen (FOSMA) aim to restore public access.

The union moved to the King's College grounds, initially to the Butchart Recreation Centre and then to the Hub, now commonly known as The Students' Union Building.

The Sports Union has an office in the reception area of Aberdeen Sports Village.

=== CEO fraud in 2015 ===
In the academic year of 2015/16, several crisis points were acknowledged by AUSA with a claim that "AUSA is Broken" sent in an all-student communication highlighting structural issues. Further to this were consequent blog posts on the AUSA website acknowledging the need for a new constitution and a new sabbatical officer structure to come into effect for the next academic year.

Further controversy arose in early 2016, when breaking news by STV News that the CEO, Jacqueline McKay, had been removed from the post amid accusations of fraud, to which she pled guilty on trial at Aberdeen Sheriff Court. After numerous delays, she was sentenced to 250 hours of unpaid work in April 2019.

Despite setbacks, a new constitution was created and installed along with a new sabbatical structure by the incumbent team – Genna Clarke, Veronica Hoffman, Laura Cristea, Megan Burgoyne, Liam Fuller & Holly Bruce. Liam Fuller was the only officer who sought re-election, successfully. The first election for the new sabbatical team took place that same year with the new structure taking effect in the academic session of 2016/17. Chubbe Anucha was elected president.

=== Aberdeen Life Ethics Society ===
In April 2019, the Aberdeen Life Ethics Society, an anti-abortion group, filed a lawsuit against the university and AUSA, after it was refused permission to start a society, claiming it was a violation of human rights law. The society was approved in May 2019, and allowed to have a campus presence, with AUSA's pro-choice policy suspended.

=== 'Rule Britannia' row ===
In December 2020, a student was reprimanded by AUSA, and banned for two weeks from its premises, for saying 'Rule Britannia' during a debate on a policy banning military organisations and personnel from AUSA buildings or events, after a complaint by a fellow student let to an investigation that found her words 'could be construed as potentially discriminatory'. She was also banned from the politics society. The meeting ultimately resolved to overturn the policy. The incident prompted comments by Toby Young of the Free Speech Union, and Calvin Robinson.

=== Alleged elections harassment ===
Following reports of alleged student harassment during a sabbatical officer election in 2023, AUSA launched an investigation and disqualified candidate Akua Serwaa Agyeman for breaching election rules.

=== Save UoA Languages ===
Following University of Aberdeen's announcement of its intention to cut language degrees in 2023, Vice President for Education Rhiannon Ledwell launched the campaign 'Save UoA Languages'. It pressured the university's senior management to stop consultations and halt restructuring plans to save lecturer jobs. Finn Abou El Magd, elected convener for the School of Languages, Literature, Music and Visual Culture, won NUS Scotland 'Student of the Year' in 2024 for his role in the campaign.

=== Banking controversy ===
In 2024, The Board of Trustees at AUSA produced a risk register which flagged a medium to high risk of fraud or error causing financial loss. AUSA scrapped autonomous Bank of Scotland accounts for activities, mandating societies and sports clubs to use a centralised banking system controlled by the Students' Union though Membership Solutions Limited (MSL).

Students criticised the union for delayed implementation. A lack of initial training on the system for committees of SU activities led to a wide spread lack of understanding of how to use the system by Students. This led to delays in payment requests being approved at the SU level, concerns over the accuracy of displayed cash balances, society committee members going into debt.

The departure of the Students Unions Finance Manager in July 2025 caused further problems in implementation and feature initially promised by the end of the academic year 2024/25 such as monthly bank statements for activities and online trading modules for committees have still not been implemented at the end of the academic year 2025/2026.

=== Democracy review ===
Student Council voted to approve a democracy review by consultants Coole Insight in June 2025. Changes include a reduction of student officers from five to four, and replacing monthly Student Council meetings with triennial assemblies. The outcomes of the review are unpopular among many Student Councillors, Sabbatical Officers, SU Staff and Board Trustees.

=== 25th Anniversary ===
A ceilidh was planned to celebrate 25 years of AUSA in its current form, but it was cancelled due to low ticket sales.

=== Leadership changes ===
In August 2025, Graeme Kirkpatrick left as chief executive of AUSA for the equivalent role in St Andrews Students' Association. Lorna Cruickshank became interim head. Fiona Heinonen took office in November 2025, but she left in 2026 after less than a year in the job. Ollie Kasper-Hope was hired as interim chief executive.

== Media ==
=== The Gaudie ===
The university's independent student newspaper, The Gaudie, is affiliated with the AUSA as a Student Group, a type of affiliation that gives it more autonomy than affiliated Clubs or Societies. Published fortnightly during the academic terms, it is recognised as one of the oldest student newspapers in Scotland.

In 2003, there was a controversy when AUSA attempted to impose its editor of choice on The Gaudie, leading to the resignation of the editor.

In 2026, AUSA imposed a policy allowing staff to sanction editors for publishing articles causing embarrassment to the union. The problem was highlighted in The Sunday Times.

=== Aberdeen Student Radio ===
Aberdeen Student Radio (ASR) is also affiliated with AUSA. Having relaunched as a live station in January 2007, the internet-based broadcaster is Aberdeen's first student radio station in ten years. It broadcast live every day during term time and has since become inactive. It was relaunched multiple times since.

ASR relaunched again in September 2026.

== Executive committee ==
The executive positions within AUSA are one-year sabbatical positions for which any student may stand. An annual election takes place before Easter for the following year's committee. There are also a number of non-sabbatical positions including 12 School Conveners School, 2 Postgraduate Education Reps, 9 Vice-Chairs and 1 Chair of Council, which are again, elected by students on a yearly basis. These roles make up the Student Council. The Trustee Board of the Association is made up of the 5 Sabbatical Officers, 4 Student Trustees, 3 External Trustee and since the 2015/16 crisis 1 University appointed Trustee - nominally the Vice-Principal Education.

=== Sabbatical Team ===
AUSA had 5 sabbatical officer positions until 2026/27, but the 2026 democracy review was advanced to reduce their number.

The 2026/27 new team took office at the beginning of July 2026 after being elected in March 2026:

- Student President - Kaitlin Agius
- Vice-President for Communities - Mitalee Suchak
- Vice-President for Education - Courage Mene
- Vice-President for Activities - Hannah Cowie
- Vice-President for Welfare - Olivia Demonstranti
