= Conservative Association =

Conservative Party (UK) local organisations

A Conservative Association (CA) is a local organisation composed of Conservative Party members in the United Kingdom. Every association varies in membership size but all correspond to a parliamentary constituency in England, Wales, Scotland and Northern Ireland. An executive council of officers are elected every year at an annual general meeting who represent electoral wards in their local areas and are designated with specified responsibilities. University Conservative associations are run independently from constituency associations. A major role comes in the form of fund-raising, campaigning, and the selection of candidates to compete in local and parliamentary elections. The first associations were formed as early as 1832.

== Executive councils ==
The executive boards which are elected every year generally consist of the following officers:

- Honorary President
- Chairman
- Deputy Chairman Political
- Deputy Chairman Membership & Finance*
- Treasurer
- Association Agent/Secretary
- Area/Ward Representatives (Chairman and 2 others)
- Data Protection Officer
- Volunteer Engagement Officer

*The title Deputy Chairman Membership & Finance is frequently substituted with Deputy Chairman Membership & Fundraising

== Associations ==
There is typically one association in each constituency, although in some areas such as Cumbria, a multi-constituency association has been formed into federation's.

There are also associations at some universities including:

- Cambridge University Conservative Association
- Oxford University Conservative Association
- Glasgow University Conservative Association
- Nottingham University Conservative Association
- University of Aberdeen Conservative and Unionist Association

== See also ==
- Constituency Labour Party
