= Glasgow University Conservative Association =

UK university conservative organization

Glasgow University Conservative & Unionist Association
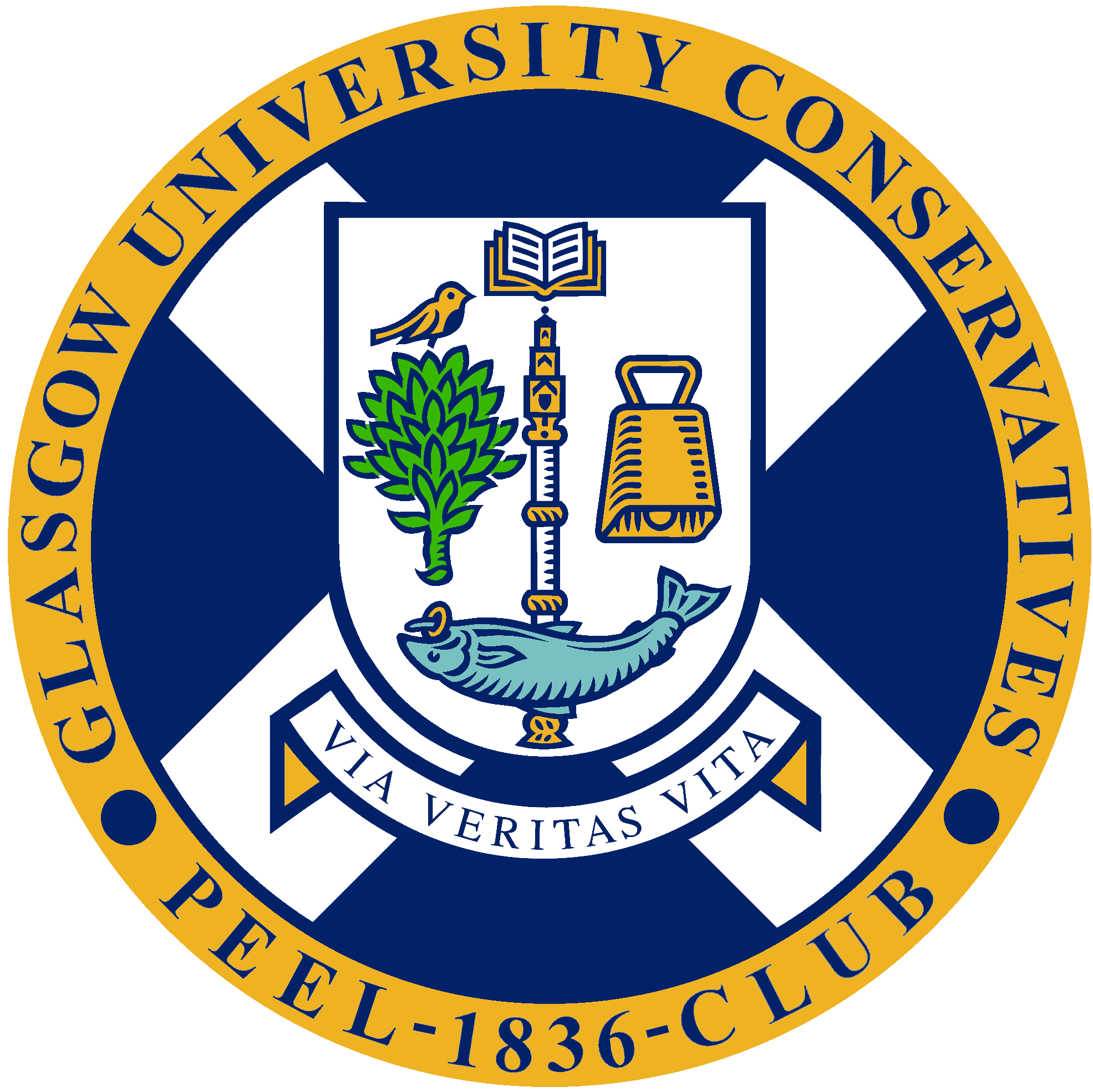
- Abbreviation: GUCC / GUCUA
- Predecessor: Peel Club
- Formation: 1836 (as The Peel Club)
- Location: Glasgow, United Kingdom
- President: Jack Johnson
- Parent organisation: University of Glasgow
- Affiliations: Scottish Conservative and Unionist Party

The Glasgow University Conservative & Unionist Association (GUCUA) was founded in 1836 at the University of Glasgow, and is the oldest University Conservative association in the United Kingdom. It became a branch of the Federation of Conservative Students and of the Young Conservatives, and remains affiliated to the Scottish Conservative Party and the Scottish Young Conservatives. Its main aim is to promote Conservative and Unionist principles on campus and to provide a safe-space for Conservative debate.

Its original name was The Peel Club, and was formed after Robert Peel's 1836 election as Rector of Glasgow University; early members included critic John Campbell Shairp and clergyman Norman Macleod (who was a president of the club). In 1852 it changed its name to Glasgow University Conservative Club, which it remained for 120 years, renaming itself to GUCUA in 1972, before finally dying out in the 1980s. It was later reformed as the Glasgow University Conservative & Unionist Association and remains active.

== History ==
The Peel Club, historically referred to as Glasgow University Peel Club, was founded in 1836 as a political association at the University of Glasgow. It was named after its patron Sir Robert Peel, Prime Minister of the United Kingdom under William IV and, later, Queen Victoria. It was intended to serve as a platform for discussing Conservatism and public policy, engaging in debate and rhetoric, and assisting with Conservative election campaigns. Some sources state that the Peel Club was founded in annual commemoration of Sir Robert Peel's election to the position of Lord Rector of the University of Glasgow, due to his Conservative leanings. Sir James Graham, sometime Lord Rector of the University of Glasgow, stated that the founding of the Peel Club was the first political organisation of its kind in the walls of the University of Glasgow. After Peel's death in 1850, the Peel Club was disbanded and replaced by a new organisation in 1852 called Glasgow University Conservative Club, which after 120 years in 1972 became Glasgow University Conservative Association.

A particular aim of the club, which would later be restated in the 1972 Constitution, was to preserve the dignity of the Rectorial Chair of the university by promoting prominent Conservatives to occupy the position. This has resulted in many famous Conservative candidates, the most notable of whom was Benjamin Disraeli, who was elected to the three-year term in 1871 and 1874. The Peel Club's role was debated in the House of Commons in 1840. Concerns were raised about whether universities should allow such political organisations to operate, as it was argued that they could contribute to disorderly or frivolous activities among the student body. The matter was brought before the House by Robert Wallace, MP for Greenock, who argued that university professors, especially those funded by the nation, should abstain from endorsing or supporting political meetings conducted by students, to preserve the institution's neutrality. The motion was withdrawn without being put to a vote.

The Peel Club's involvement in student elections sparked public protests against what was perceived as politically motivated and trivial behaviour. Political figures, including Sir James Graham and Peel, engaged in discussions about the club, highlighting the significant attention the issue attracted. Eventually, it was suggested that Glasgow University professors should directly address the matter to prevent further controversies.

== Activities ==
Today, the Association operates as a forum for students to discuss Conservative politics and participate in events and campaigning in Glasgow and further afield around Scotland. The Association is affiliated with the national Conservative Party through Scottish Young Conservatives which brings together associations of young conservatives throughout Scotland, mainly through university groups.

The Association is operated by a six-strong Executive, which comprises the President, vice-president, Secretary, Treasurer, Outreach Officer, and Union Officer who are elected on an annual basis at the association's Annual General Meeting in May. The society also boasts having had Ruth Davidson as its honorary President in the past.

The Association executive organises a range of events throughout the academic year. This primarily includes the Annual St Andrew's Day Dinner held every year in November, as well as its monthly 'Pint & Policy' events. The Association also regularly campaigns for the Conservative Party for elections at all levels across the country.

== Alumni project ==
In 2011, the Association embarked upon a project to identify all the previous presidents and other office bearers of the Association.

== In the media ==
Members of the Association were featured in a documentary that charted the campaign in East Renfrewshire in the run-up to the 2010 general election. The Association's annual St Andrew's dinner in November 2010 attracted media attention as people opposing government policies on higher education protested outside with police being called and three protestors being arrested.

== Notable members ==
- Sir Robert Peel, 2nd Baronet, FRS (Patron)
- Norman Macleod (Caraid nan Gaidheal) (Club President)
- Sir Duncan Cameron
- John Campbell, 1st Baron Campbell
- John Campbell Shairp
- Francis Charteris, 10th Earl of Wemyss
- John Kerr, 7th Marquess of Lothian
- Andrew Neil, Journalist and Broadcaster

== See also ==
- Conservative Future Scotland
- Scottish Young Conservatives
