= Aberdeen University F.C. =

Association football club in Aberdeen City, Scotland

Aberdeen University
- Full name: Aberdeen University Men's Football Club
- Nickname: Uni
- Founded: 1872
- Ground: Hillhead Centre
- Capacity: 1000 (300 seated)
- Manager: Scott Reid
- 2022–23: SJFA North Championship, 13th of 16
Home colours	Away colours

Aberdeen University Football Club is an association football team representing the University of Aberdeen.

== History ==
=== Early years ===
The University Club was formed in 1872 and became members of the SFA in 1904. Aberdeen University has qualified to the main section of the Scottish Cup competition three times. In 1907, Aberdeen University lost 5–1 to Raith Rovers at Kirkcaldy whilst in 1925 the Club travelled to Dundee United only to go down 5–1 in the first Round. The only home tie played by the Uni after qualifying was in 1913 when the visitors were Peebles Rovers. In front of 2000 spectators, Aberdeen University lost 3–0.

For 1954–55, 1955–56, and 1956–57, the SFA scrapped the qualifying rounds, and put all entrants into the first round proper. The Uni lost in the first round every time, but in 1954–55 did take Girvan F.C. to a replay.

In season 1963–64, the university clinched the prestigious local amateur knockout competition, the Bowie Cup, for the first time. The following season saw the university enter the Scottish Amateur Cup for the first time only to suffer defeat in the first Round at the hands of Doune Castle. Their defence of the Bowie Cup came to an end against Cove Rangers. At this time a great rivalry existed between the university and, at that time, fellow amateurs Cove Rangers.

The 1960s were a prolific time for the university led by coach Tudar Hale who later left to take up an appointment in England. In 1969 Dr Eric Farr took over as Coach and led the university to further success at SUSF and Amateur level. Key players of the era were captain John McGrory, vice-captain Dave McWilliam, Alex Ingram, Phil Williams, Roy Pilgrim, Norrie Stuart and Robin Mitchell, all of whom were University internationalists. In 1969, the club was also awarded the Allender Memorial Trophy as the most outstanding Club within the Athletic Association.

Aberdeen came close to regaining the Queen's Park Shield in the early-1980s but the real highlight of these times was the university's victory over Deveronvale in an Aberdeenshire Cup replay which set up a clash with a strong Aberdeen side. This was the year Aberdeen went on to win the European Cup Winners Cup and almost 1000 turned out at Kings to see the university suffer a narrow 2–0 defeat. The Aberdeen team included Bryan Gunn in goal, Willie Falconer and Andy Watson. The previous year Aberdeen had again lost out narrowly to Peterhead who had a certain Joe Harper leading the line. There was some success at Universities level with the Uni second team claiming the Paterson Trophy for the first time in 1982–83.

In 1987–88, an Aberdeen side led by Club Captain Rab Adams and coached by former players, Craig Graham and Mark Stewart, finally reclaimed the Queen's Park Shield as SUSF Champions. Four Aberdeen players – Mark Thomson, Dave Lewis, Ali Bryce and Gavin Dennis went on to represent Scottish Universities with Bryce and Dennis picking up caps for the British Uni's team as well. The following season Steve Laing was picked as a member of the SUSF team.

=== Mixed successes ===
The final decade of the 20th century saw mixed fortunes for the club. Although the Club finally regained its place in Amateur League Division 1 with promotion in 1996–97, it failed to win the SUSF Title and was almost relegated to Merit League 2. The best year was certainly season 1996–97 when the 2nd XI won the Paterson Trophy as well as promotion to Division 4, whilst the firsts also gained promotion and saw their hopes of winning the SUSF Title scupper by a dodgy goal-difference rule. These feats were recognised when the club was awarded the Allender Trophy as best Club in the AA for only the second time.

January 2000 saw a memorable day for the University F.C. when a strong Aberdeen side were held to a 0–0 draw in a friendly fixture held at Cameron Barracks. The Dons side included notable Premier Division players such as Gary Smith, Jim Hamilton, Ricky Gillies, Darren Mackie, Dennis Wyness and Kevin Rutkiewicz. The match was a tight affair and both sides had chances to win, Mark Peat in the Aberdeen goal and Ewan Scott in the Uni goal making crucial saves.

=== Millennium era ===
In the 1999–2000 season, the club achieved significant success. After finishing third in the Scottish Universities Championship, the university team progressed through the BUSA Shield competition, which included matches across the UK. They ultimately defeated De Montfort University at Warwick with a score of 2–1 in the final of the British Universities' Shield Competition. This marked the first time a Scottish University had won this title. The team was coached by Mike Ross and captained by Andrew "Taz" Johnson, featuring players such as Kasper Neilson, Duncan Fisher, Ross Logie, Dougie McConnachie, Brendan Hanke, and Ross Preston. Brendan Hanke scored both goals in the final, contributing to the 2–1 victory over De Montfort, which also involved injuries to striker Donal Henretty and goalkeeper Ewan Scott.

As of 2012, the university competed concurrently in BUCS 1A University League, The Premier Division of Aberdeen Amateur League and the Aberdeenshire & District League

In June 2014, the club were accepted as members of the Scottish Junior Football Association and join the SJFA North Region from the 2014–15 season. In 2019, a match was abandoned after an 'extremely offensive racial slur' was used against a player for the 2nd team, but the next year the footballer who was accused was cleared at Aberdeen Sheriff Court.

== Ground ==
The first team matches are played at the Hillhead Centre in the north of the city of Aberdeen, close to the historic campus at Old Aberdeen and to the main halls of residence. The centre has a full sized grass pitch with seating for 300, floodlights, a pavilion and a full-sized synthetic training pitch. Other teams' matches are played at the Balgownie Playing Fields, north of the city in Bridge of Don and at King's College.

== Teams ==
The club's first team competes in the North Region of the SJFA. They also run a team in the Aberdeenshire League, three teams in the local amateur leagues as well as four in the university leagues.

== Honours ==
=== Senior ===
- Aberdeenshire Cup
  - Winners 1920–21

=== Amateur ===
- Aberdeenshire AFA Division Two
  - Champions 1976–77
- Aberdeenshire AFA Division Two (East)
  - Champions 2003–04
- North of Scotland Amateur Cup
  - Winners: 1950–51, 1958–59, 1967–68
- Aberdeen F.C. Trophy
  - Winners: 1966–67, 2008–09
- Aberdeenshire AFA Premier Trophy
  - Winners: 2003–04

=== University ===
- BUCS Scottish Division 2A
  - Champions 2011–12, 2018–19
- BUSA Shield
  - Winners 1999–00
- Queen's Park Shield
  - Winners 1921–22, 1922–23, 1927–28, 1929–30, 1932–33, 1936–37, 1937–38, 1940–41, 1945–46, 1946–47, 1987–88, 1948–49, 1949–50, 1950–51, 1954–55, 1956–57, 1962–63, 1965–66, 1968–69, 1969–70, 1987–88
- Conference Cup
  - Winners 2018-19
