= Tom Patey =

Scottish mountain climber (1932–1970)

Thomas Walton Patey (20 February 1932 – 25 May 1970) was a Scottish climber, mountaineer, doctor and writer. He was a leading Scottish climber of his day, particularly excelling on winter routes. He died in a climbing accident at the age of 38. He was probably best known for his humorous songs and prose about climbing, many of which were published posthumously in the collection One Man's Mountains.

== Early life ==
Patey was born on 20 February 1932 at Ellon, Aberdeenshire, Scotland. He was educated at Ellon Academy and Robert Gordon's College in Aberdeen. He studied medicine at the University of Aberdeen, graduating in 1955 with a MB ChB.

== Medical career ==
After becoming fully registered as a doctor, he served for four years as Surgeon Lieutenant in the Royal Marines at the 42 Commando School at Bickleigh. Patey then worked for eight years as a general practitioner (GP) in Ullapool, in the far north-west of Scotland.

== Climbing ==
Patey first became interested in climbing while he was in the Scouts, but it was at University in Aberdeen, that he first revealed his full talent as an exploratory climber, captaining the Lairig Club. Much of his early exploratory routes were on Lochnagar and neighbouring Cairngorms. A dedicated climber, he often dropped all other commitments for the prospect of a good climb. Patey's preference of travelling light extended to leaving his gloves behind on some ice climbs and he had a disrespect for climbing ropes unless they were necessary. While he was at Bickleigh, he would regularly open up new climbs on the Devon Tors. He cared little about recording these climbing details, since that way, if routes were left unblemished and apparently virgin, those following could have a similar excitement in their experience. This generosity of spirit, along with his exuberance and irrepressive energy, left a lasting memory with his companions. His irreverent climbing songs would often be accompanied at a piano by incessant humming through a comb and paper.

He climbed extensively in Scotland (making the first winter traverse of the Cuillin ridge with Hamish MacInnes, David Crabbe and Brian Robertson in 1965), as well as achieving notable ascents in the Alps and the Karakoram including the first ascent of the Muztagh Tower (7273 metres) with John Hartog, Joe Brown and Ian McNaught-Davis in 1956 and Rakaposhi (7788 m) in 1958 with Mike Banks. In 1968, he and Ian Clough were the first to climb Am Buachaille, a sea stack off the coast of Sutherland.

In July 1966 Patey, Rusty Baillie and Chris Bonington climbed to the top of the Old Man of Hoy. The three pioneered the route up which was repeated with others on a live televised BBC outside broadcast on 8–9 July 1967.

On 25 May 1970 he fell and died while abseiling from The Maiden, a sea stack off Whiten Head on the Sutherland coast.

== Personal life ==
Patey married Elizabeth Davidson and they had three children.

== Awards and honours ==
In 1966 he received a Queen's Commendation for Brave Conduct, after assisting in an incident where two climbers were killed after a fall.

== Legacy ==
In 1971, the collection One Man's Mountains was published.

In 2022 a playground was opened in Chapelton named Patey Park.

One Man's Lecacy, written by Mike Dixon, was published in 2022.

== Bibliography ==
- One Man's Mountains, Tom Patey, 1971, ISBN 0-575-01358-3. Collected by his great friend Chris Bonington with his Introduction. ISBN No:- 0-86241-664-7 first published by Victor Gollanz Ltd. 1971
- Peter Donnelly, 'Patey, Thomas Walton [Tom] (1932–1970)', Oxford Dictionary of National Biography, Oxford University Press, 2004
