= Scottish Young Conservatives =

Youth wing of the Scottish Conservatives

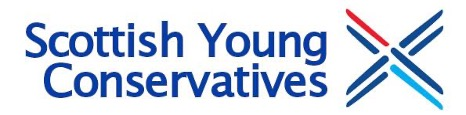
- National Chairman: Josh Macleod
- National Campaign Coordinator: Kai Suleman
- National Secretary: Samir Zentouri
- Honorary President: Meghan Gallacher
- Founded: 2019
- Mother party: Scottish Conservatives
- Website: https://www.scottishconservatives.com/

The Scottish Young Conservatives is the youth wing of the Scottish Conservatives, representing members under the age of 26. The Scottish Young Conservatives formed in 2019 following the dissolution of Conservative Future Scotland. The group often hold events at Conservative conferences, and online.

== Current National Board ==
Board
Office	Incumbent
Chairman of the board	Josh Macleod
National Campaign Coordinator	Kai Suleman
National Secretary	Samir Zentouri
North Regional Chairman	Archie Peill
East Regional Chairman	Reece Sinnott
West Regional Chairman	Craig Wardrope

== Former Chairmen ==
- Holly Moscrop 2022-2024
- Emma Currie - 2021-2022
- Cameron Findlay -2020-2021
- Michael Bow - 2019-2020
- Cllr. James Bundy - 2017-2019
- Cllr. Michael Kusznir - 2015-2017

== Activity ==
The Scottish Young Conservatives were established in 2019 following the dissolution of Conservative Future Scotland. Since 2019, Scottish Young Conservatives have been active in elections across Scotland.

The Scottish Young Conservatives have worked with members of the Scottish Conservatives shadow cabinet to develop party policy.

In 2023 and 2024, the Scottish Young Conservatives held events at the Scottish Conservative Party conferences, highlighting the importance of the youth wing in the party.

During the 2024 General Election, Scottish Young Conservative activists campaigned across Scotland, helping retain 5 out of the 6 Conservative seats in Scotland, including a gain in Gordon and Buchan.

During the Scottish Conservatives 2025 conference in Edinburgh the Scottish Young Conservative held a drinks reception and network event, with speaker Meghan Gallacher.

== Organisation ==
The Scottish Young Conservatives is run by a national board of six members elected annually, these begin in September. These include three national positions and three regional chairs. Each candidate must get a proposer and a seconder to make it onto the ballot of membership. If only one candidate is successfully nominated, then they are elected unopposed. Regional Chairs, must be nominated by youth members from within their region and if when the membership is balloted members only vote in their own region.

In 2025 Aberdeenshire became the first area to get a Young Conservative Association of its own. This association isn't run by the central SYC Board but instead by its own elected board, through Aberdeenshire Conservatives Association. This was intended to promote youth membership growth in Aberdeenshire.

The Scottish Young Conservatives also have affiliated associations in universities across Scotland:

- University of Aberdeen Conservative and Unionist Association
- Glasgow University Conservative Association
- University of St Andrews Conservative and Unionist Association
- University of Edinburgh Conservative and Unionist Association
- University of Strathclyde Conservative and Unionist Alliance
- Stirling University Conservative Society
