= Hamish MacInnes =

Scottish mountain climber (1930–2020)

Hamish MacInnes OBE BEM FRSGS
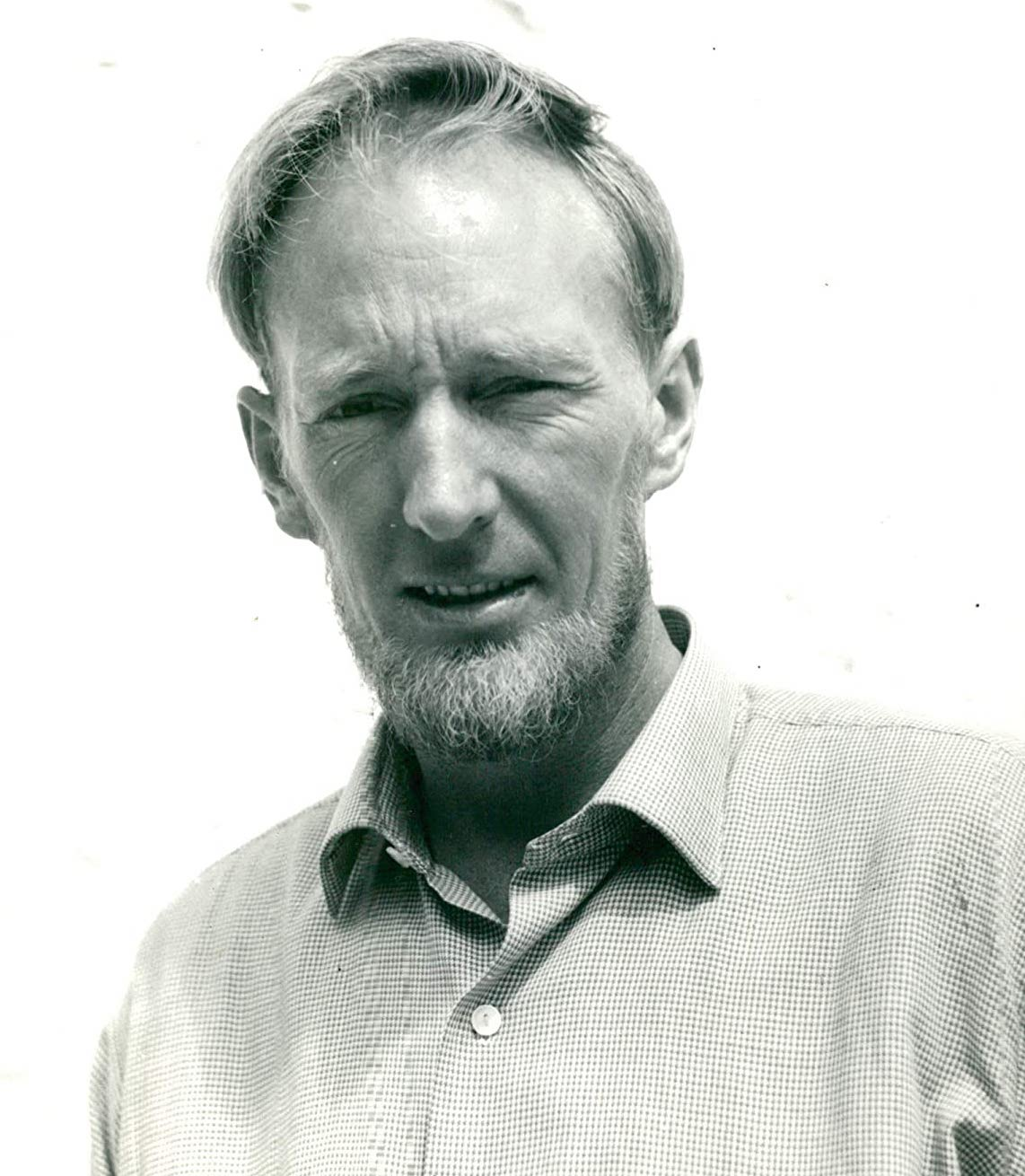
- Born: 7 July 1930; Gatehouse of Fleet, Galloway, Scotland
- Died: 22 November 2020 (aged 90); Glen Coe, Scotland
- Occupation: Mountaineer
- Known for: Invention of all metal ice-axe and MacInnes stretcher, a light-weight foldable alloy stretcher

Hamish MacInnes OBE BEM FRSGS (born McInnes; 7 July 1930 – 22 November 2020) was a Scottish mountaineer, explorer, mountain search and rescuer, and author. He has been described as the "father of modern mountain rescue in Scotland". He is credited with inventing the first all-metal ice-axe and an eponymous lightweight foldable alloy stretcher called MacInnes stretcher, widely used in mountain and helicopter rescue. He was a mountain safety advisor to a number of major films, including Monty Python and the Holy Grail, The Eiger Sanction and The Mission. His 1972 International Mountain Rescue Handbook is considered a manual in the mountain search and rescue discipline.

== Early life ==
MacInnes was born in Gatehouse of Fleet, in the historical county of Kirkcudbrightshire in Galloway, Scotland, on 7 July 1930. His father's surname was McInnes, but Hamish, (according to his obituary in The Times) "later adopted the more distinctive Scottish spelling of the family name". He was the youngest child amongst five siblings. He had three sisters and a brother who was eighteen years older than Hamish. His father served in the Chinese police in Shanghai, then returned to join the British Army and the Canadian Army during World War I. He had served with National service, shortly after the Second World War, with a deployment in Austria.

== Mountaineering and mountain rescue ==
MacInnes was exposed to mountaineering at a very early age and by the age of 16, he had already climbed the Matterhorn. He had also built a motor car from scratch at the age of 17. He first climbed in the Himalaya in 1953, when he was 23: he planned an attempt to scale Mount Everest with his friend John Crabbe Cunningham, but before they left New Zealand they learnt Edmund Hillary and Tenzing Norgay had scaled the mountain. He went on to complete the first winter ascent of Crowberry Ridge Direct and of Raven's Gully on Buachaille Etive Mòr in the Scottish Highlands, with Chris Bonington in 1953. He was also a part of the group that scaled the Bonatti Pillar on the Aiguille du Dru, a mountain on the Mont Blanc massif of the French Alps. He performed this feat with a fractured skull, which he suffered after being hit by a rockfall.

He is noted for bringing many innovations to mountaineering equipment, including designing the first all-metal ice axe. He is credited with introducing the short ice axe and hammer with inclined picks for Scottish winter work in the early 1960s. He also pioneered the exploration of the Glencoe cliffs for winter work with the Glencoe School of Winter Climbing and led the area's mountain rescue team from 1961. In the 1960s he was secretary of the Mountain Rescue Committee of Scotland. He is recognised as having developed modern mountain rescue in Scotland. In 1962, in Switzerland, he attended an avalanche dog training course, then set up the Search and Rescue Dog Association in Scotland with his wife in 1965. He was one of the co-founders the Scottish Avalanche Information Service in 1988. He invented the eponymous MacInnes stretcher, a lightweight and specialised folding alloy stretcher, which is used for rescues worldwide.

In 1972 he was part of an 11-strong team that attempted to be the first to ascend the southwest face of Everest, but their expedition did not reach the summit due to bad weather. In 1975, MacInnes was deputy leader to Bonington's Mount Everest Southwest Face expedition, which included Dougal Haston and Doug Scott. He had been tasked with designing equipment for that expedition but after being caught in an avalanche high on the mountain was unable to continue. He went on to scale the overhanging prow of Mount Roraima in the mountainous regions around Brazil, Venezuela and Guyana.

Although never an official member, MacInnes climbed extensively with the Creagh Dhu, Glasgow-based climbing club as well as with the rival Aberdeen clubs. He joined forces with Tom Patey to make the first winter traverse of the Cuillin Ridge on Skye.

He was involved with a number of films, as climber, climbing double and safety officer, including The Eiger Sanction and The Mission. He also worked on the 1975 film The Eiger Sanction and the 1986 film The Mission. He was part of the production team for the 1975 film Monty Python and the Holy Grail. He served as mountaineering consultant, built the film's "bridge of death" and became friends with star Michael Palin.

He wrote many books on mountaineering, having first written a paperback for the Scottish Youth Hostel Association in 1960. His works include the International Mountain Rescue Handbook (1972), which is regarded as the standard manual worldwide in the mountain search and rescue discipline, and Call-out: A climber's tales of mountain rescue in Scotland (1973), his account of his experiences leading the Glencoe Rescue team. He was also a photographer.

MacInnes acquired a number of nicknames within the mountaineering community, including the affectionate "Old Fox of Glencoe", "The Fox of Glencoe" and "MacPiton".

In 1994 MacInnes resigned his position as leader of the Glencoe Mountain Rescue team, over a decision taken by his colleagues to let the BBC make a documentary based on their work. However, the decision changed and he returned as leader.

== Awards and honours ==
MacInnes was awarded the British Empire Medal (BEM) in the 1962 New Year Honours. He was appointed an Officer of the Order of the British Empire (OBE) for services to mountaineering and mountain rescue in Scotland in the 1979 New Year Honours. He received an Honorary Doctorate from Heriot-Watt University in 1992, University of Stirling in 1997 and University of Dundee in 2004. In 2007 he was awarded honorary fellowship of the Royal Scottish Geographical Society. He was inducted into the Scottish Sports Hall of Fame in 2003 and received the Scottish Award for Excellence in Mountain Culture in 2008. In 2016 he was presented with the Chancellor’s Medal from the University of the Highlands and Islands.

In 2018 a documentary film was produced for BBC Scotland, titled Final Ascent:The Legend of Hamish MacInnes. Introduced by his friend, Michael Palin, it recounts the story of MacInnes's life and achievements, and how he used archive footage, his photographs and his many books to "recover his memories and rescue himself".

== Personal life ==
MacInnes lived in Glen Coe from 1959. Until 1998, he resided at "Allt Na Reigh", a cottage within the glen that was subsequently purchased by since-disgraced media personality, Jimmy Savile. MacInnes later said that he was hoodwinked by Savile, and pleaded that the house, which was believed not to have been the scene of any of the offences for which Savile subsequently became infamous, not be demolished; however, after his death, a friend of MacInnes told the BBC that MacInnes "would have wanted" the house knocked down to "remove the stain from the landscape." In June 2024, the house's current owners were granted planning permission to demolish it and replace it with a new residence, to be named Hamish House in MacInnes' honour. In March 2026, it was reported that the demolition had been completed.

=== Illness and death ===
In 2014, MacInnes suffered a urinary tract infection which, initially undiagnosed, rendered him severely confused and suffering from delirium. He was sectioned into Belford psychiatric hospital in the Scottish Highlands. From there he made multiple attempts to escape, including scaling up the outside of the hospital to stand on its roof. After around five years the infection was diagnosed and treated. MacInnes recovered, though he lost memories of his adventuring career that he sought to rebuild by reading his accounts of them.

He died on 22 November 2020, aged 90, at his home in Glen Coe. Writing on his death, the Scottish daily The Scotsman said, "No one man has done more to help put in place the network of emergency response efforts designed to keep climbers from harm’s way, and it seems that MacInnes took just as much pleasure in helping to rescue people as he did in making record-breaking ascents."

== Bibliography ==
=== Non-fiction ===
==== Autobiography ====
- MacInnes, Hamish (2021). The Fox of Glencoe. Aberdeen: Scottish Mountaineering Press. ISBN 978-1-907233-39-5.

==== Mountaineering in Scotland: Scottish Mountain Guides ====
- MacInnes, Hamish; Ian Clough; Richard Brian Evans (1969). Ben Nevis and Glencoe: Guide To Winter Climbs. Manchester: Cicerone. ISBN 978-0-902363-00-7.
- MacInnes, Hamish (1971). Scottish Climbs: A Mountaineer's Pictorial Guide To Climbing in Scotland. London: Constable. ISBN 978-0-09-457450-2.
- MacInnes, Hamish (1976). Scottish Climbs 1. London: Constable. ISBN 978-0-094-61050-7.
- MacInnes, Hamish (1977). Scottish Climbs 2. London: Constable. ISBN 978-0-094-61060-6.
- MacInnes, Hamish (1982). Scottish Winter Climbs. London: Constable. ISBN 978-0-09-463620-0.

==== Mountaineering in the Greater Ranges ====
- MacInnes, Hamish (1974). Climb to the Lost World. London: Hodder and Stoughton. ISBN 978-0-340-19041-8.
- MacInnes, Hamish (1979). Look Behind The Ranges: A Mountaineer's Selection of Adventures and Expeditions. London: Hodder and Stoughton. ISBN 978-0-340-18949-8.
- MacInnes, Hamish (1984). Beyond the Ranges. London: V. Gollancz. ISBN 978-0-575-03512-6.

==== Mountain rescue ====
- MacInnes, Hamish (1963). Climbing: A Guide To Mountaineering And Mountain Rescue. Edinburgh: Scottish Youth Hostels Association. OCLC 53800277.
- MacInnes, Hamish (1972). International Mountain Rescue Handbook. London: Constable. ISBN 978-0-09-458200-2.
- MacInnes, Hamish (1973). Callout. London: Hodder and Stoughton. ISBN 978-0-340-17396-1.
- MacInnes, Hamish (1980). High Drama: Mountain Rescue Stories From Four Continents. London: Hodder and Stoughton. ISBN 9780340245590.
- MacInnes, Hamish (1985). Sweep Search. London: Hodder and Stoughton. ISBN 978-0-340-37258-6.
- MacInnes, Hamish (1987). The Price of Adventure: More Mountain Rescue Stories From Four Continents. London: Hodder and Stoughton. ISBN 9780340263235.
- MacInnes, Hamish, ed. (2003). The Mammoth Book of Mountain Disasters: True Stories of Rescue from the Brink of Death. New York: Carroll & Graf. ISBN 978-0-7867-1239-7.

==== Hillwalking in Scotland ====
- MacInnes, Hamish (1979). West Highland Walks. London: Hodder and Stoughton. ISBN 978-0-340-23915-5.
- MacInnes, Hamish (1979). West Highland Walks 1: Ben Lui to the Falls of Glomach: Scenic and Historical walks in the west Highlands. London: Hodder and Stoughton. ISBN 978-0-340-35971-6.
- MacInnes, Hamish (1979). West Highland Walks 2: Skye to Cape Wrath: Scenic and Historical walks in the west Highlands. London: Hodder and Stoughton. ISBN 978-0-340-35972-3.
- MacInnes, Hamish (1984). West Highland Walks 3: Arran to Ben Lui: Scenic and Historical walks in the west Highlands. London: Hodder and Stoughton. ISBN 978-0-340-26912-1.
- MacInnes, Hamish (1984). West Highland Walks 4: Cairngorms and Royal Deeside: Scenic and Historical walks in the west Highlands. London: Hodder and Stoughton. ISBN 978-0-340-42384-4.

==== Scottish culture, nature and wildlife ====
- MacInnes, Hamish (1988). My Scotland. London: Constable. ISBN 978-0-09-467700-5.
- MacInnes, Hamish (1988). Highland Walks. London: Hodder and Stoughton. ISBN 978-0-340-42384-4.
- MacInnes, Hamish; Oliver Thomson (1988). Glencoe. London: National Trust for Scotland. ISBN 978-0-901625-52-6.
- MacInnes, Hamish (1989). The Way Through The Glen. London: Constable. ISBN 978-0-09-469340-1.
- MacInnes, Hamish; Moira Kerr (1989). Land of Mountain and Mist. Glencoe: Glencoe Productions. ISBN 978-0-9514380-0-8.

=== Fiction ===
- MacInnes, Hamish (1976). Death Reel. London: Hodder and Stoughton. ISBN 978-0-340-20725-3.
- MacInnes, Hamish (2008). Murder in the Glen: A tale of murder in the Scottish Highlands. Glencoe: Glencoe Productions. ISBN 978-0-951-43801-5.
- MacInnes, Hamish (2011). Errant Nights: A fast action modern story of treasure and treachery. Glencoe: Glencoe Productions. ISBN 978-0-951-43802-2.
