= Conservative Future Scotland =

Scottish political youth organisation

- Founded: 2005
- Dissolved: 2019
- Ideology: Conservatism
- Mother party: Conservative Party

Conservative Future Scotland (CFS) was the youth wing of the Scottish Conservative Party.

== Organisation ==
The organisation formed in early 2005 by the merger of the Scottish Young Conservatives and the Scottish Conservative and Unionist Students (SCUS) group, a process which had happened with its sister organisation in the rest of the United Kingdom - Conservative Future - in 1998. Its membership comprised all of the Scottish Conservative Party's members under the age of 30 or who were currently in higher education. The organisation formed itself into three regions, each with its own executive. Within the regions University Conservative and Unionist Associations and area Conservative Future branches organised at the local level.

CFS was the independent sister organisation of Conservative Future, the former central Conservative Party body that operated in the rest of the UK.
