= Queen Mary Labour Society =

Former Prime Minister Clement Attlee visiting the Queen Mary Labour Society in March 1953

The Queen Mary Labour Society (QMLS), formerly Queen Mary Labour Club, is a society at Queen Mary University of London for students who support the Labour Party. It is affiliated to Labour Students and the Labour Party.

== History ==
The club was established in the late 1940s, and has previously had strong connections to the Oxford and Cambridge Labour Clubs. In recent years, it has enjoyed collaborating with the Hull University Labour Club and the LSE SU Labour Society. Over the years the society has gone through several disaffiliations as a result of committees failing to hand on the society before graduating. QMLS has been an active society in the Tower Hamlets region, with members campaigning during the general elections of 1992, helping contribute towards the +7.6% swing towards Labour and, more prominently, in 1997.

=== Recent ===
In 2004/05 the Society was reinstated by students who wanted to bring back a strong alternative voice to the East End. Supporters campaigned for the then Labour Party MP for Bethnal Green and Bow, Oona King, but King was defeated by George Galloway, the Respect candidate, at the 2005 general election. Labour supporters at the Queen Mary University experienced a very difficult and volatile campaign during this period waged by opposition who heavily campaigned against the MP on her position on the Iraq War.

The society now also holds regular speaker events, and helps train members in campaigning. Recent speakers include the former Mayor of London, Ken Livingstone, and MPs Rushanara Ali, Peter Hain and Andy Burnham. Past speakers have included the now Baroness Oona King.

=== Co-Chairs ===
Year	Co-chair	Co-chair
2016-2017	Morgan Jones	Dominique Pope
2017-2018	Kate Reynolds	Enaab Mohammed
2018-2019	Liam Baker	Beth Cheshire
2019-2020	Eli Harris	Anaïs Crane
2020-2021	Amen Tesfay	Maria Garcia Sotos
2023-2024	Lionel Henry	Sam Billington
2024-2025	Sam Billington	
2025-2026	Josh Latham	Zoe Cummins

== Alumni ==
- Peter Hain MP and Leader of the House of Commons 2003–2005
- Joshua Peck, the Bow West Councillor, was President of the Queen Mary Labour Society when a student at the university.
