= Aberdeen Oilers Floorball Club =

Floorball club

Aberdeen Oilers
- Full name: Aberdeen Oilers Floorball Club
- Founded: 2007
- Coach: (Slovakia) Michal Žácik
- League: Scottish League
| Home colours | Away colours |

The Aberdeen Oilers are a floorball club based in Aberdeen, Scotland. They were founded in 2007 and currently play in the Scottish Floorball League. They won the Northern League Championship in 2008/09, Scottish Floorball League in 2012/13 and 2014/15.

== History ==
Aberdeen Oilers were officially founded in January 2007 and became the most northern floorball club in Britain. Two brothers and former Dundee floorball players (Neil and Michael Shaw) and two students from Switzerland (Sascha Fässler and Lorna Teal) started off with organising training sessions in Aberdeen, the first of which was held on 9 December 2006 at Torry Sports Centre. Soon the group of players prospered as members were attracted from all walks of life including students from the local education institutions and people living and working in the Aberdeen area. Quite a number of individuals of the initial group were employed in companies of the local oil industry – a fact which largely influenced the choice of the later adopted team name. On 3 March 2007 the first ever match was played in Torry Sports Centre against Balwearie Floorball Club from Fife, which ended in a narrow 2–3 defeat for the Oilers. After further friendly matches played in Glenrothes and a friendly tournament in Dundee the Oilers were soon ready to play their first competitive matches.

== Early competitive games ==
Seatronics became the first sponsor of the club, helping to acquire the first full team kit that allowed the team to participate in the Scottish Cup qualifiers that took place in April 2007. After a clear 9-0 defeat in their first match against Scottish league record champions Chapel Floorball Club the Oilers managed a deserved 5-5 draw in a hard fought match against Balwearie Lightning. The next tournament on the agenda was the British National Championships organised by the Great Britain Floorball Federation and played in Perth on the first weekend in May 2007. A group of 15 Oilers made their way down to central Scotland to attend the flagship competition in British floorball and meet teams from all over the country. Drawn in a group together with teams from Bath, Glenrothes and Linlithgow the Oilers managed to secure a clear 5-0 victory in their first match against Linlithgow. The second match against Chapel Floorball Club from Glenrothes ended in an undeserved 4-1 defeat after a good game with plenty of goal opportunities on both sides. A further defeat against Bath meant that Aberdeen Oilers ended up 3rd in their group. The relatively good goal difference however allowed the team to progress to the quarter-finals of the tournament where they played later finalists Brighton Rock. The match ended 4-1 in favour of Brighton. To determine the final placing of teams, a further round saw the first clash between Dundee Northern Lights and the Oilers, a game which proved to be one of the closest fought in the whole tournament. Regular time could not split the two sides after the Oilers scored an equaliser in the dying seconds of the game. The penalty shoot-out ended in sudden death after 7th rounds with the more experienced Dundee side finally winning the game. Aberdeen ended up 8th overall.

== 2007/08 Northern League season ==
In their first ever season (2007/2008) in the British Floorball Northern League, the team qualified for the British National Championships in the last round of the league after wins against Dundee and Balwearie Lightning. Another sponsorship deal was secured with Kongsberg Maritime. At the Nationals held in Stratford-Upon-Avon in May 2008 the team played against London Vikings, Bournemouth Bullets and Brighton Rock, and missed out narrowly on a place in the semi-finals.

== 2008/09 Northern League season ==
Already in their second season (2008/2009) in the British Floorball Northern League, Aberdeen Oilers were crowned Scottish floorball champions. The team showed a flawless performance with only one game lost in the whole season. In the British National Championship held in Edinburgh in May 2009, Aberdeen played Oxford Floorball club, Balwearie Lightning, London Sharks, Brighton Rock and Edinburgh. Final position was 7th place. After the British Nationals 2009, Aberdeen Oilers Floorball Club announced a new equipment sponsorship deal with Swedish floorball equipment manufacturers Salming. The new Salming jerseys feature the logo of World Vision charity.

== Squad ==
Season 2016/2017

Goalkeeper
| Number | Nationality | Name | Place of Birth |
|---|---|---|---|
| 36 | (Czech Republic) | Vit Strachon | Czech Republic |
| 30 | (Scotland) | Alec Young | Aberdeen, Scotland |

Defenders
| Number | Nationality | Name | Place of Birth |
|---|---|---|---|
| 11 | (Czech Republic) | Šárka Zacpálková | Czech Republic |
| 43 | (Czech Republic) | Vít Karlíček | Czech Republic |
| 12 | (Czech Republic) | Benjamin Březina | Czech Republic |
| 16 | (Latvia) | Arvis Heidemanis | Tukums, Latvia |

Forwards
| Number | Nationality | Name | Place of Birth |
|---|---|---|---|
| 33 | (Poland) | Szymon Burzynski | Warsaw, Poland |
| 69 | (Latvia) | Sigvards Stalidzans | Latvia |
| 88 | (Czech Republic) | Adam Paulenda | Czech Republic |
| ? | (Czech Republic) | Jan Felcman | Czech Republic |
| ? | (Czech Republic) | Tomáš Dubec | Czech Republic |

== League record ==
Northern League Championship

| Year | Teams | Position | GP | W | D | L | GS | GA |
|---|---|---|---|---|---|---|---|---|
| (Scotland) 2007/08 | 8 | 3 | 14 | 9 | 0 | 5 | 81 | 73 |
| (Scotland) 2008/09 | 7 | 1 | 12 | 11 | 0 | 1 | 76 | 24 |
| (Scotland) 2010/11 | 6 | 3 | 10 | 6 | 0 | 4 | 42 | 25 |
| Total 1 title | | | 36 | 26 | 0 | 10 | 199 | 122 |

Scottish Floorball League

| Year | Teams | Position | GP | W | D | L | GS | GA |
|---|---|---|---|---|---|---|---|---|
| (Scotland) 2011/12 | 9 | 3 | 14 | 11 | 0 | 3 | 112 | 46 |
| (Scotland) 2012/13 | 8 | 1 | 14 | 14 | 0 | 0 | - | - |
| (Scotland) 2013/14 | 9 | 2 | 16 | 14 | 0 | 2 | 101 | 35 |
| (Scotland) 2014/15 | 8 | 1 | 14 | 12 | 0 | 2 | 68 | 33 |
| (Scotland) 2015/16 | 8 | 3 | 14 | 9 | 1 | 4 | 70 | 58 |
| (Scotland) 2016/17 | 6 | 1 | 20 | 15 | 2 | 3 | 118 | 65 |
| Total 3 titles | | | 92 | 75 | 3 | 14 | 469 | 237 |

== British Nationals record ==
| Year | Teams | Position | GP | W | D | L | GS | GA |
|---|---|---|---|---|---|---|---|---|
| (United Kingdom) Perth 2007 | 12 | 8 | 5 | 1 | 0 | 4 | 11 | 23 |
| (United Kingdom) Stratford-Upon-Avon 2008 | 8 | 5-8 | 3 | 1 | 0 | 2 | 12 | 20 |
| (United Kingdom) Edinburgh 2009 | 12 | 7 | 6 | 2 | 0 | 4 | - | - |
| (United Kingdom) Birmingham 2012 | 12 | 12 | 5 | 0 | 0 | 5 | - | - |
| (United Kingdom) Birmingham 2013 | 12 | 8 | 4 | 2 | 0 | 2 | 20 | 17 |
| (United Kingdom) Birmingham 2014 | 12 | 4 | 5 | 2 | 0 | 3 | 22 | 30 |
| (United Kingdom) Birmingham 2015 | 12 | 11 | 4 | 1 | 0 | 3 | 12 | 21 |
| Total | | | 27 | 9 | 0 | 18 | 77 | 111 |
