= King's Pavilion =

Sports venue in Aberdeen, Scotland

Coordinates: 57°09′49″N 2°06′00″W

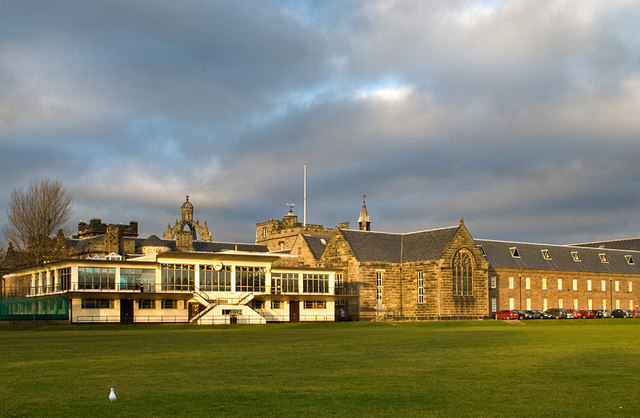
- Exterior of the King's Pavilion
- Interactive map of the King's Pavilion area

General information
- Status: Open
- Location: Old Aberdeen, Aberdeen, UK
- Opened: 1941
- Owner: University of Aberdeen

Design and construction
- Architect: Alexander George Robertson Mackenzie

The King's Pavilion is a building in Old Aberdeen owned by the University of Aberdeen.

It is home to the yearly WayWORD festival ran by the university's Word Centre. Events are held over a week every September which celebrate unconventional forms of expression.

== History ==
The building was opened in 1941 by the chancellor of the university James Meston, 1st Baron Meston. It was designed by Alexander George Robertson Mackenzie. It replaced an earlier sports pavilion.

The building was Category B listed in 1967.

== Facilities ==
The building contains a gym and changing facilities. The building also contains a swimming pool which is now disused following the opening of the swimming pools at the Aberdeen Sports Village.
