= Holburn Stadium =

Greyhound racing venue in Aberdeen, Scotland

- Location: Aberdeen
- Coordinates: 57°07′24″N 2°07′26″W
- Opened: 7 June 1933
- Closed: 1969

Holburn Stadium, also known as Aberdeen Greyhound Stadium, was a greyhound racing stadium in Aberdeen, Scotland. It is not to be confused with the Aberdeen Regent Park Greyhound Stadium.

== History ==
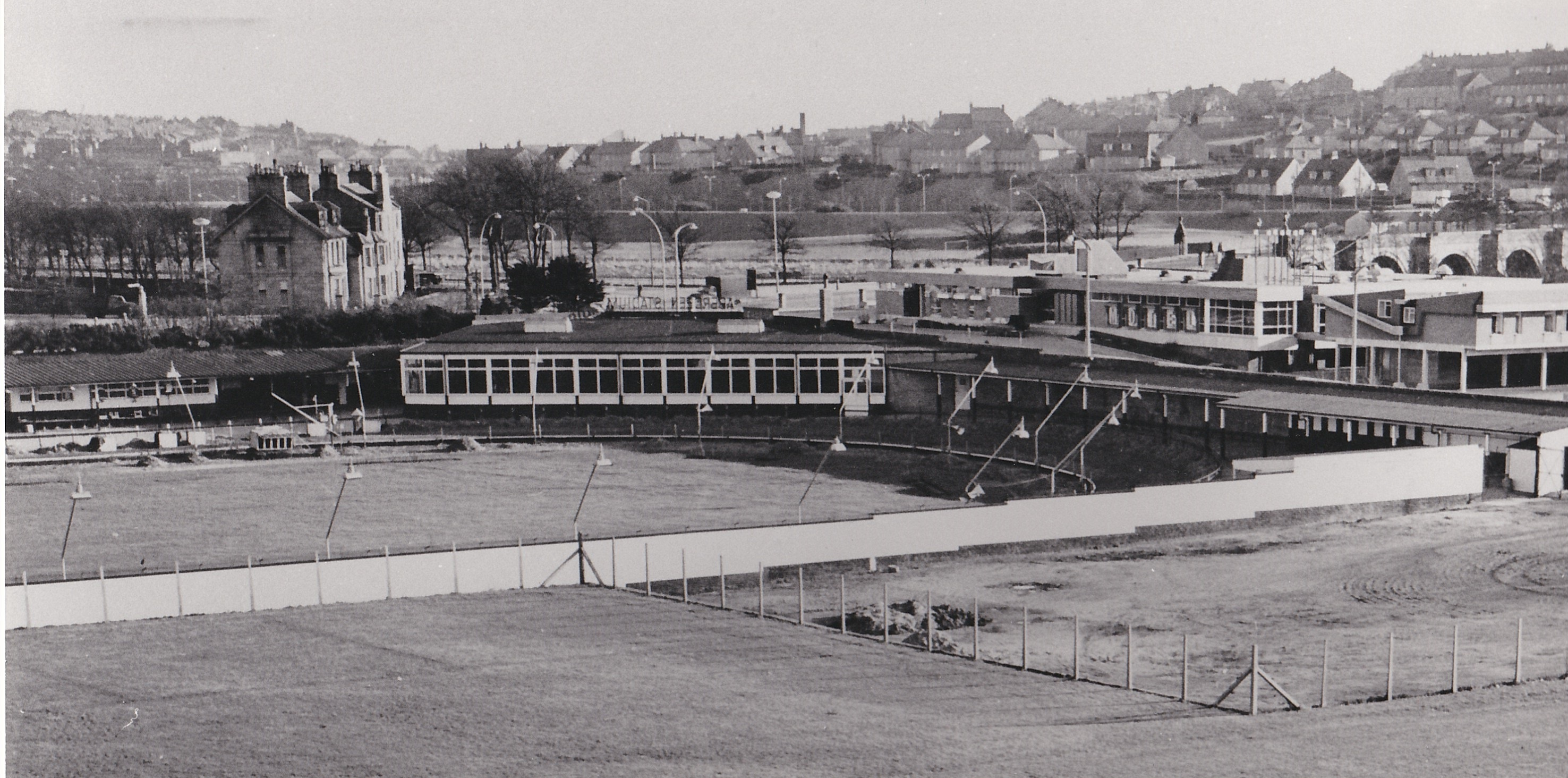
Aberdeen Greyhound Stadium also known as Holburn Stadium, c.1960

The stadium was located on the south west side of Aberdeen and on the north side of the Bridge of Dee. The owners Aberdeen Stadium Ltd affiliated the track to the National Greyhound Racing Society with the first racing taking place on 7 June 1933. On opening night proceedings were started by the pipes and drums and brass band of the 4th Battalion of the Gordon Highlanders and the opening speech was made by Col. A.H. Farquharson of Invercauld. An attendance of 5,000 saw a greyhound called Rimutaka win the first race at the new stadium.

It was described as a handy little track with very sharp bends and short straights and not the ideal circuit for large greyhounds. It had an Inside Sumner hare and the principal event was the Aberdeen Journals Cup. All of the greyhounds running at the track were owned by the company and kennelled in the 150 track kennels. The circumference of the track was 344 yards.

There was a buffet bar and three licensed bars on site and racing took place on Wednesday & Saturday evenings at 7.30pm. John Jolliffe arrived from Dundee Greyhound Stadium as Racing Manager in 1935 and stayed until 1936 before he moved to Cardiff Arms Park and then Wembley. A totalisator system was installed during the latter part of 1943, under the Betting and Lotteries Act 1934.

== Closure ==
The last meeting was held on 4 October 1969 before the stadium was converted into a supermarket and warehouses. The closure was sudden with the public, staff and trainers only being informed of the closure several weeks previous.

== Track records ==
Distance yards	Greyhound	Time	Date
230	Brook Bridge	13.07	7 August 1965
400	Bright Pike	23.51	16 April 1938
400	No Problem	22.64	12 July 1965
570	No Problem	32.99	5 May 1965
400 H	Flaxley Tom	24.70	29 August 1938
