= Aberdeen Regent Park Greyhound Stadium =

Greyhound racing venue in Aberdeen, Scotland

- Location: Aberdeen
- Coordinates: 57°09′45.9″N 2°05′32.8″W
- Opened: 1932

Aberdeen Regent Park was a greyhound racing stadium in Aberdeen. It is not to be confused with the Holburn Stadium.

The stadium opened on 25 June 1932 near School Road in Aberdeen. The first race meeting featured thirty greyhounds in six races and attracted a crowd of 2,000. The Aberdeen Greyhound Racing Company held racing on a regular basis at Regent Park over 315 & 360 yards. Despite two meetings held on Saturdays there was already plans to build a larger track called the Holburn Stadium. The track had a betting licence during 1935 and 1936 but the company was dissolved in 1940. The stadium remained in place and was subsequently used as an athletics stadium known as the Chris Anderson Stadium. The Chris Anderson Stadium was redeveloped and now forms part of the Aberdeen Sports Village.
