= Hillhead Centre =

Sports venue in Aberdeen City, Scotland

- Location within Aberdeen City council area
- Former names: Keith Park
- Coordinates: 57.175°N 2.097°W
- Owner: University of Aberdeen
- Capacity: 1000 (300 seated)
- Type: Stadium
- Events: Football; Hockey
- Surface: grass & synthetic

Tenants
- Aberdeen University F.C. Bridge of Don Thistle F.C.

The Hillhead Centre (formally known as Keith Park) is a sports stadium in the Old Aberdeen area of Aberdeen, Scotland. It is owned and managed by the University of Aberdeen.

It consists of a floodlit, grass football pitch with a 300-capacity seated stand and a floodlit artificial pitch used for hockey and training. There is a fully equipped pavilion with conference rooms and physiotherapy suite.

Currently, the stadium is used for football matches in the North Region Juniors by Aberdeen University's first team and Bridge of Don Thistle. It is also used for matches and training of various university sports teams.
