= Aberdeen Sports Village =

Sports facility in Aberdeen

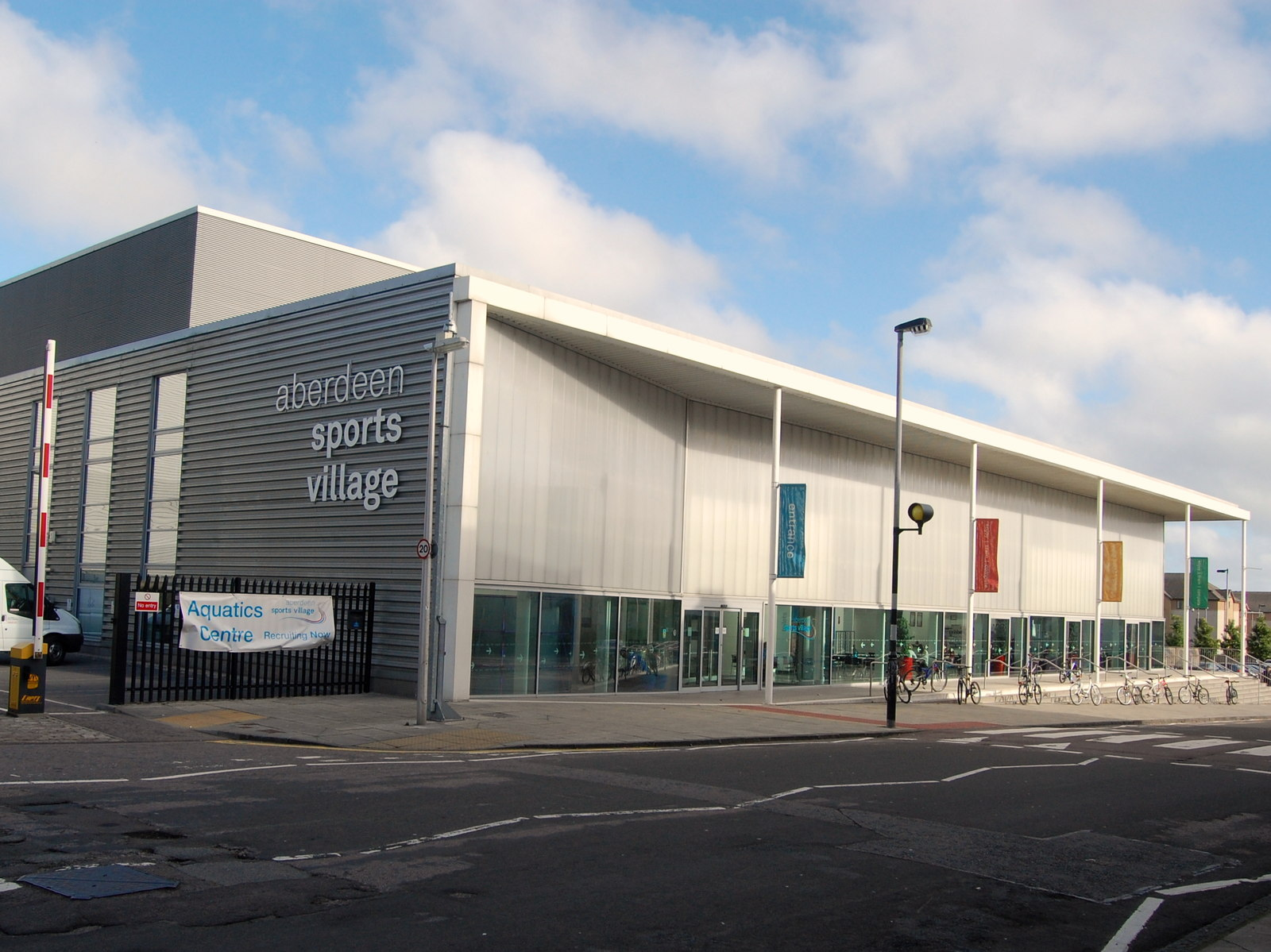

- Location within Aberdeen City council area
- Location: Aberdeen, Scotland, United Kingdom
- Coordinates: 57.1620°N 2.0928°W
- Owner: University of Aberdeen, Aberdeen City Council

Construction
- Opened: 22 August 2009 (Sports Village); 5 May 2014 (Aquatics Centre)

Aberdeen Sports Village is a sports facility in Aberdeen, Scotland.

== History ==
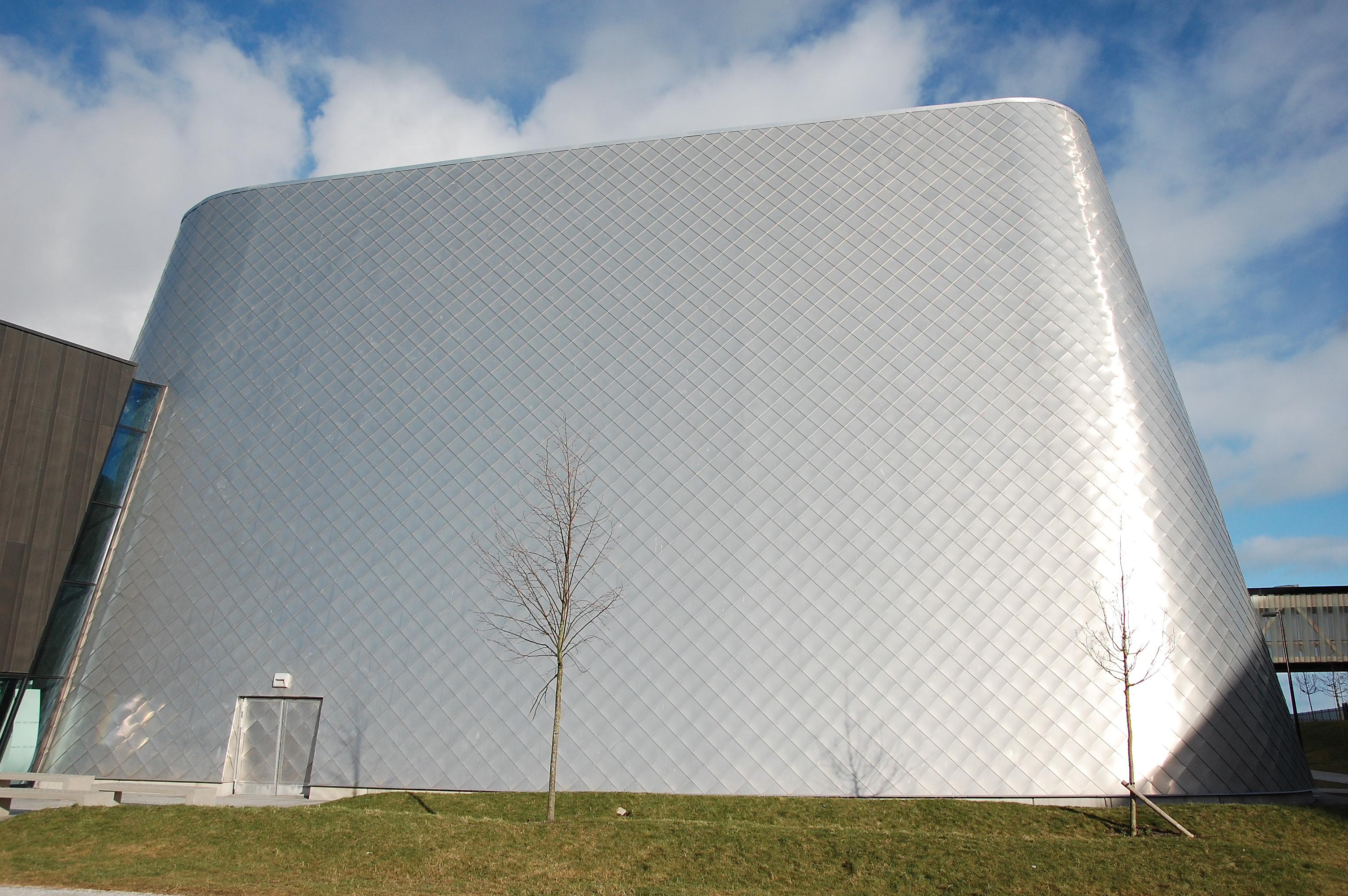
The Aquatics Centre

The present athletics track is situated on the site of the Aberdeen Regent Park Greyhound Stadium which later became the Linksfield Stadium and subsequently the Chris Anderson Stadium. The stadium was redeveloped as part of the Sports Village project.

The first stage of the Village was opened on 22 August 2009, representing an investment of £28 million. In 2010, Aberdeen Sports Village hosted a training session of the Scottish Rugby Team. In 2012 Aberdeen Sports Village was an official pre-games training venue of the Cameroon Olympic Team prior to London 2012.

Construction on the Aquatics Centre started in late 2011 and was completed in early 2014 following an investment of £22 million. The centre opened on 5 May 2014 as an expansion of the existing Aberdeen Sports Village complex. The King's Pavilion swimming pool was subsequently closed.

The athletics track was replaced in 2015. In 2022, the outdoor hockey pitch had its surface and lighting replaced.

== Facilities ==
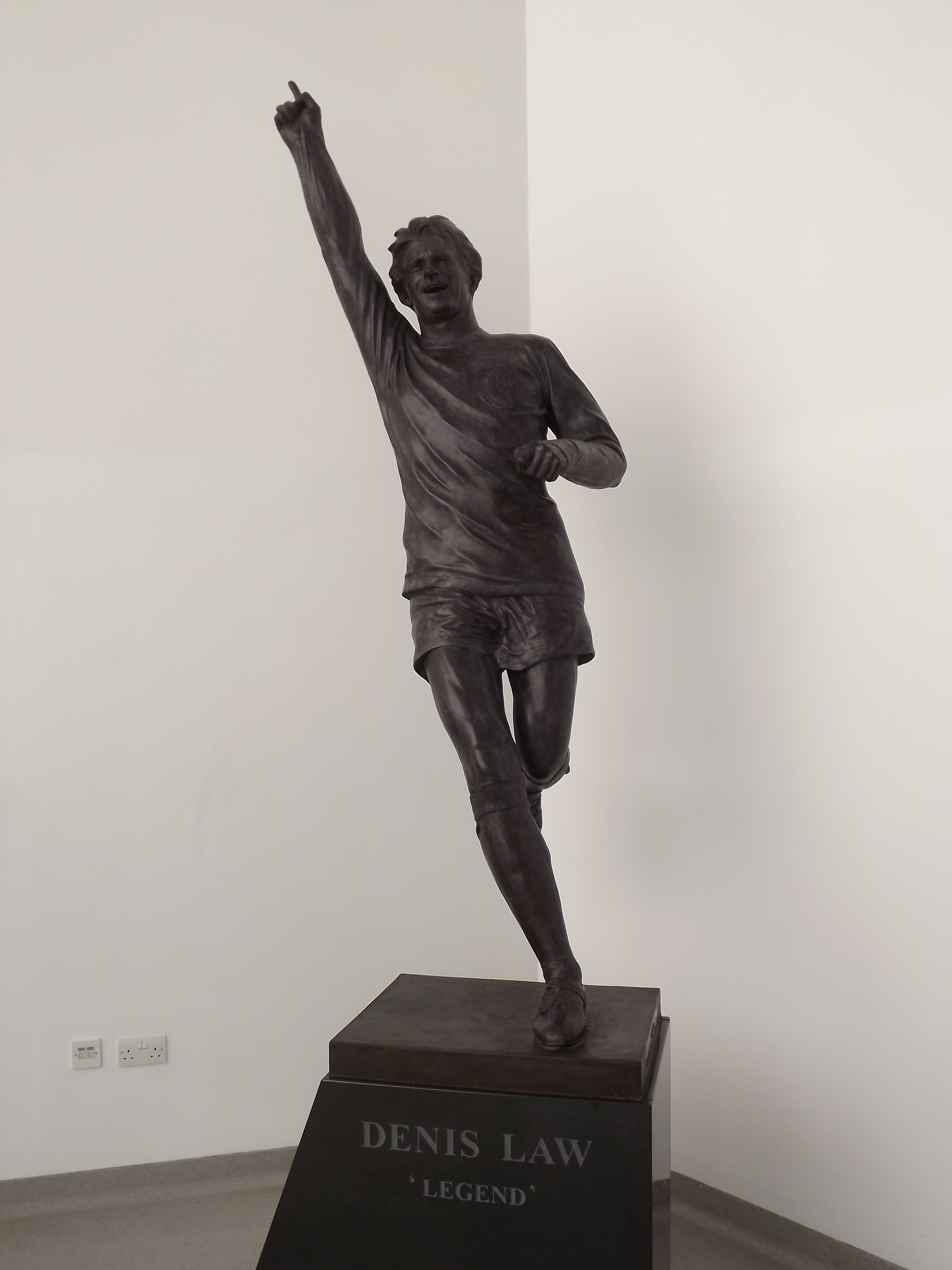
Statue to Denis Law

The Sports Village features a 135m indoor running straight, indoor football pitch, sports hall, four squash courts, gym and two dance studios. There is a 400m outdoor running track as well as a football pitch, which is the home ground of Junior team Bridge of Don Thistle F.C. since 2018 (and previously Lewis United F.C. until they folded in 2018). There is also a hockey pitch.

The Aquatics Centre hosts a 50-meter Olympic standard pool and a 25-meter pool with diving boards up to 10 meters as well as a sauna, steam room, and exercise rooms. There are two cafes, located at the main entrance to the Sports Village and at the entrance to the Aquatics Centre.

A statue to footballer Denis Law is situated at the facility's entrance.

== Events ==
The venue held the 2014 Commonwealth Water Polo Championships between 5–12 April 2014. These events were held prior to opening of the venue and while exterior and car park construction was still taking place. The Aquatics Centre hosted a leg of the Para Swimming World Series event in 2022. The Aquatics Centre is also the host of the yearly Gowlands Cup underwater hockey tournament.

== See also ==
- Sport in Aberdeen
- List of long course swimming pools in the United Kingdom
