= David Torrance (journalist) =

British political journalist

David Torrance (born 7 August 1977 in Edinburgh, Scotland) is a British political journalist, author and contemporary historian. Torrance is best known for his unauthorised biography of Alex Salmond and his political commentary for STV and BBC.

== Life and career ==
Torrance was brought up in Edinburgh, Scotland where he attended Leith Academy. He matriculated to the University of Aberdeen receiving a degree in psychology and went on to study journalism at Cardiff University’s School of Journalism. Torrance began his career as a reporter for the Edinburgh Evening News from 2000 to 2001. He soon moved into television to present and produce The Week in Politics for Grampian. Torrance stayed on as the Scottish Parliamentary reporter when the programme was taken over by Scottish Television (STV) and retitled Politics Now in 2004. Torrance briefly took a break from his television commitments to work as Parliamentary Aide to the Shadow Scottish Secretary David Mundell at the House of Commons.

From 2007, he has regularly appeared on the BBC and BBC Radio Scotland reporting and commenting on the state of Scottish Politics within the larger context of the UK. Torrance later worked for the UK Parliament assisting in editing online and written content. In 2014, he returned to Edinburgh to report on that year's Scottish independence referendum.

David Torrance is a constitutional expert at the House of Commons Library. He has a PhD in history and political science, from the University of the West of Scotland

== Writings ==
In 2006, Torrance wrote his first work The Scottish Secretaries following the history of those men who served as chief minister in charge of the Scottish Office in the UK government from 1885 onward. The book has been followed by a number of unofficial political biographies and histories most notably on George Younger, David Steel, Alex Salmond, Nicola Sturgeon and Margaret Thatcher's relationship with Scotland during her political career. Torrance's work has largely focused on current and historical Scottish politics with an occasional divergence into non-political subject matters.

== List of Works ==
1. The Scottish Secretaries (2006)
2. George Younger: a Life Well Lived (2008)
3. 'We in Scotland': Thatcherism in a Cold Climate (2009)
4. Noel Skelton and the Property-Owning Democracy (2010)
5. Inside Edinburgh: Discovering the Classic Interiors of Edinburgh (2010)
6. Salmond: Against the Odds (2011)
7. Great Scottish Speeches (2011)
8. David Steel: The Biography (2012)
9. Whatever Happened to Tory Scotland? (2013)
10. The Battle for Britain: Scotland and the Independence Referendum (2013)
11. Britain Rebooted: Scotland in a Federal Union (2014)
12. 100 Days of Hope and Fear: How Scotland's Referendum was Lost and Won (2014)
13. Nicola Sturgeon: A Political Life (2015)
14. Lord Clyde: The Orkney Judge (2019)
15. A History of the Scottish Liberals and Liberal Democrats (2022)
16. The Wild Men: The Remarkable Story of Britain's First Labour Government (2024)
17. A History of the Scottish Conservative and Unionist Parties (2024)
18. Torrance, David (2026). The Edge of Revolution: The General Strike That Shook Britain. Bloomsbury Continuum. ISBN 978-1-3994-2359-5.
