= Scottish Student Sport =

- Sport: University and college sport
- Jurisdiction: Scotland
- Abbreviation: SSS
- Founded: 2005
- Location: 1st Floor; 48 Pleasance; Edinburgh; EH8 9TJ; United Kingdom
- Chairman: Peter Burgon
- Other key staff: Chief Operating Officer Stew Fowlie
- Replaced: Scottish Universities Sports Federation (SUSF); Scottish Universities Physical Education Association (SUPEA)

Official website
- www.scottishstudentsport.com
- (Scotland)

Scottish Student Sport (SSS), formed in June 2005 as Scottish Universities Sport, is the professional body for the delivery and furthering of sports at university and college levels.

The body was founded in 2005 following the merger of the Scottish Universities Sports Federation and the Scottish Universities Physical Education Association. SSS represent the Sports Unions and Sport and Exercise Departments of Scottish universities and colleges. Scottish Universities Sport was renamed to Scottish Student Sport in June 2011 following the admission of colleges as full members.
