= Dubh Loch (Glen Muick) =

Small lake in Aberdeenshire, Scotland

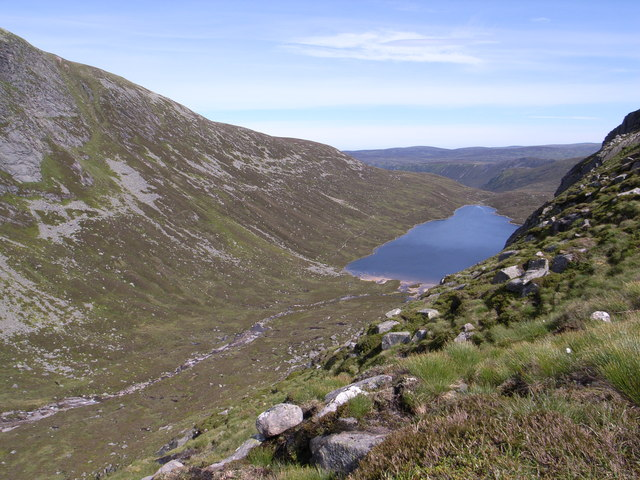

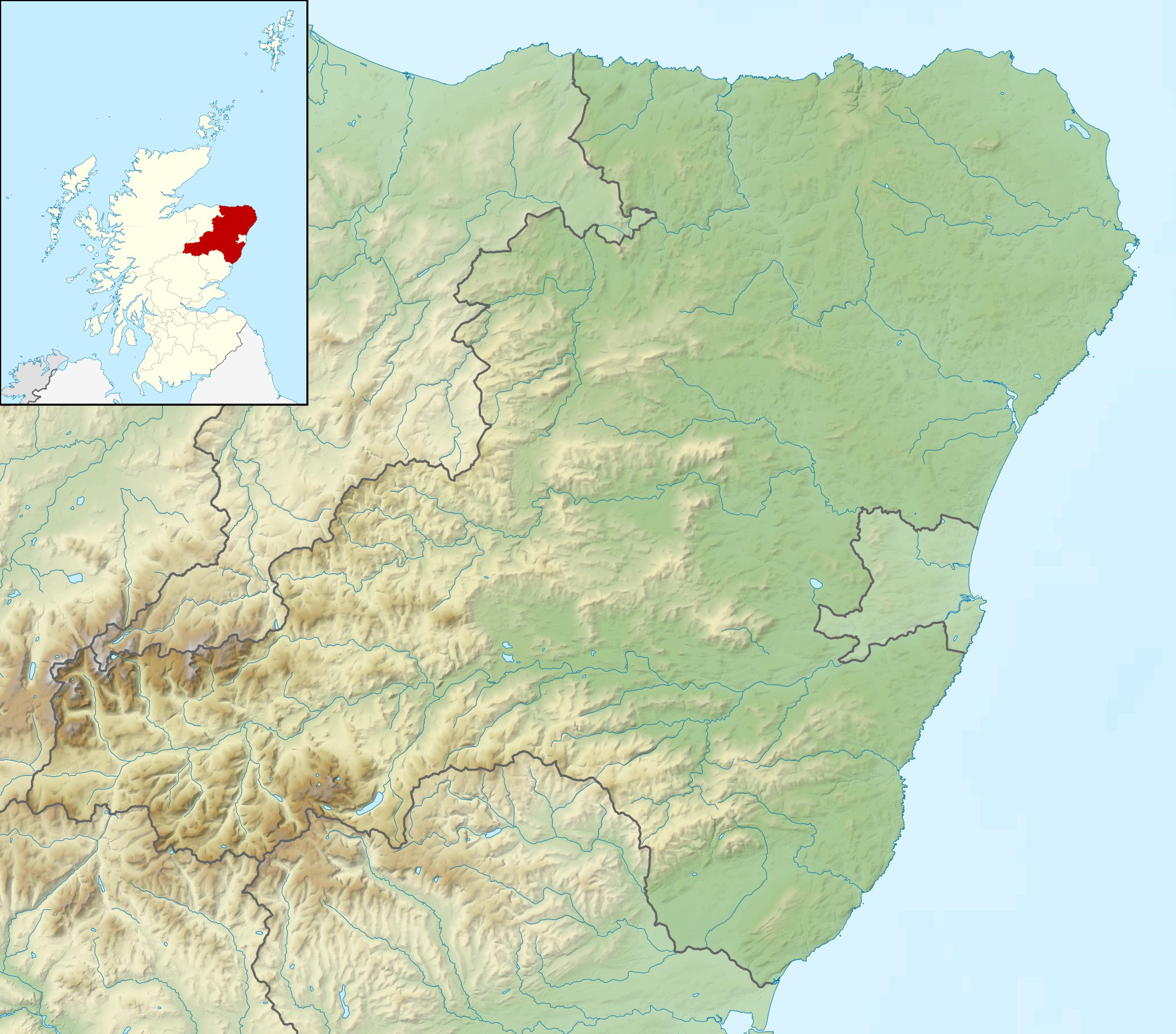
- Location within Aberdeenshire
- Location: Aberdeenshire, Scotland
- Coordinates: 56°55′46″N 3°15′12″W
- Type: freshwater loch
- Primary outflows: Allt an Dubh-loch
- Basin countries: Scotland
- Surface area: 19.9 ha (49 acres)
- Shore length^{1}: 2.3 km (1.4 mi)
- Surface elevation: 637 m (2,090 ft)
- ^{1} Shore length is not a well-defined measure.

Dubh Loch is a small upland loch situated within the Balmoral Estate, in Aberdeenshire, Scotland. It is at an altitude of 637 metres (2,090 ft), with a perimeter of 2.3 kilometres (1.4 mi). Its outflow, Allt an Dubh-loch, empties into Loch Muick approximately 2 kilometres (1.2 mi) to the southeast near the royal lodge Glas-allt-Shiel. To the southeast of the loch is the Munro Broad Cairn. To the northwest the ground slopes steeply up to Càrn a' Coire Boidheach and Lochnagar. To the west is Cairn Bannoch and over a high col to the southwest lies Loch Callater.

== Creag an Dubh Loch ==
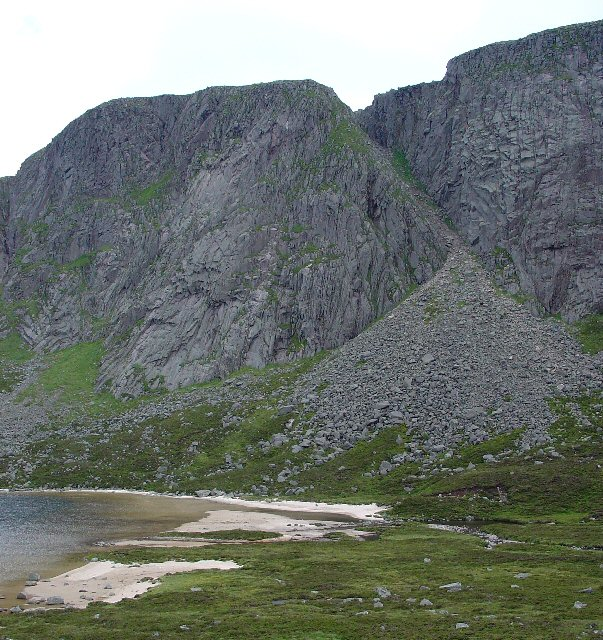
Creag an Dubh Loch

A granite wall, Creag an Dubh Loch, rises steeply above the loch on the southeast shading the loch from the sun – hence the name "dark lake". Creag an Dubh Loch is about 1.5 kilometres (0.9 mi) long and generally about 200 metres (660 ft) high – at its highest it is 270 metres (890 ft) making it the highest continuous rock face in the Cairngorms.

The loch was a favourite spot for Queen Victoria to visit from her retreat at Glas-allt-Shiel. Once her son Alfred swam out into the loch to capture and kill a wounded stag in the water.
