= Falls of Glas Allt =

Coordinates: 56.93251°N 3.20114°W

Falls of Glas Allt is a 50-metre (160 ft) waterfall near the head of Loch Muick, Aberdeenshire, Scotland. Queen Victoria liked to take walks here beside the stream flowing from Lochnagar down to Loch Muick. After the death of Prince Albert she had a cottage, Glas-allt-Shiel, rebuilt for her on the delta where the stream flows into the loch.

== See also ==
- Waterfalls of Scotland
