= Inchnabobart =

Hunting lodge on Balmoral Castle, Scotland

Coordinates: 56°58′27″N 3°08′11″W

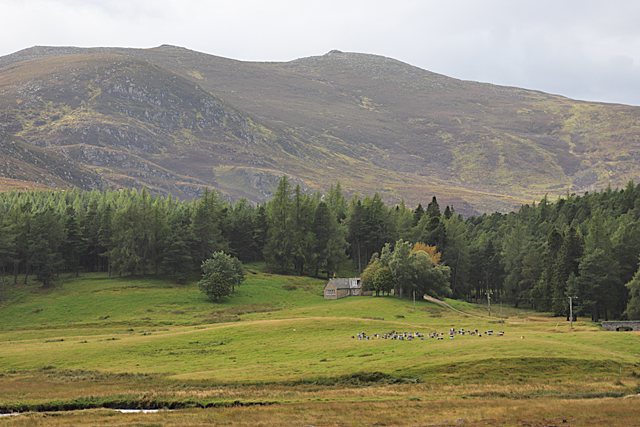
Inchnabobart and the Craig of Inchnabobart in 2019

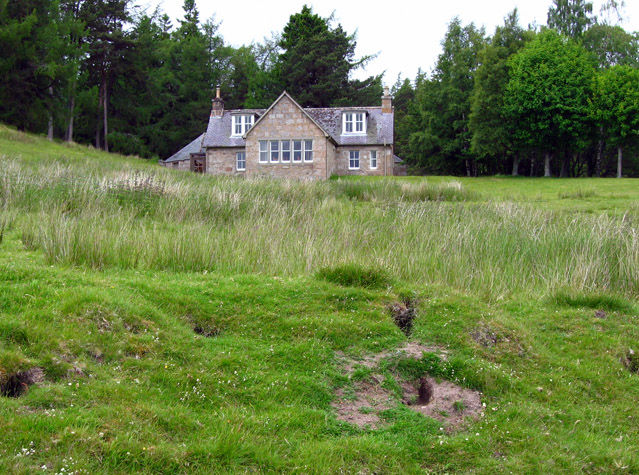
Inchnabobart in 2008

Inchnabobart is a hunting lodge on the Balmoral Castle estate in the parish of Glenmuick, Tullich and Glengairn in Aberdeenshire, Scotland. It is located to the west of the River Muick.

The site was recorded as part of the Listed Building Recording Programme (LBRP) for 2001 to 2002.

== Description ==
The building was once a farmhouse, but has been converted to resemble a traditional Scottish hunting lodge. The main structure is a small two-storey building with a stone facade, a cottage kitchen, and a fireplace. It has a separate outhouse.

The farm at Inchnabobart is the highest cultivated land in the glen. The site is visited by hedgehogs.

== History ==
Adam Watson listed the name 'Inchnabobart' as "river meadow of the cow enclosures" in his The Place Names of Upper Deeside. The Inchnabobart ford was once a major crossing of the River Muick. Drovers would ford through the Muick at Inchnabobart heading over the Capel Mounth.

A footbridge crossing the Muick was demolished in 1863 and has never been rebuilt. Local historian Robert Smith has suggested that Queen Victoria had wished to discourage members of the public from using the bridge as a "back door" into the Balmoral estate.

=== Royal use ===
On 26 September 1903 Court Circular reported that Edward VII and George, Prince of Wales had started their deer drive at the lodge before proceeding along the River Muick.

Prince Philip, Duke of Edinburgh renovated the Inchnabobart and Glas-allt-Shiel lodges. According to Smith, Prince Charles was responsible for converting Inchnabobart for use as a shiel.

In Prince Harry, Duke of Sussex's memoir, Spare, he recalls a barbecue with his father, grandparents, and great-grandmother at Inchnabobart in the summer of 2001 when he was still a teenager. Harry recalled "The warm kitchen! The old fireplace! I fell onto the fender, with its worn red cushion, and inhaled the smell of that huge pyramid of silver birch firewood stacked beside it. If there's a smell more intoxicating or inviting than silver birch, I don't know what it could be." Prince Philip barbecued fillets of venison and Cumberland sausages, while Queen Elizabeth whisked salad dressing and lit candles on the long table. Harry drank a gin and tonic with his 101-year-old great-grandmother, Queen Elizabeth the Queen Mother, and taught her how to say "booyakasha", the catchphrase of Ali G.
