= List of listed buildings in Glenmuick, Tullich and Glengairn, Aberdeenshire =

This is a list of listed buildings in the parish of Glenmuick, Tullich and Glengairn in Aberdeenshire, Scotland.

== List ==
Name	Location	Date Listed	Grid Ref. (Note: Sometimes known as OSGB36, the grid reference (where provided) is based on the British national grid reference system used by the Ordnance Survey. • "Guide to National Grid". Ordnance Survey. • "Get-a-map". Ordnance Survey.)	Geo-coordinates	Notes	LB Number (Note: Historic Environment Scotland assign a unique alphanumeric identifier to each designated site in Scotland, for listed buildings this always begins with "LB", for example "LB12345".)	Image
Polhollick Suspension Bridge Over River Dee At No 34378 96519				57°03′18″N 3°05′00″W	Category B	9295	Upload Photo
By Ballater, Glengairn Parish Church				57°05′45″N 3°09′26″W	Category B	9300	Upload Photo
Cambus O'May, Crookmore Including Boundary Walls, Gatepiers And Railings				57°04′18″N 2°58′11″W	Category C(S)	50728	Upload Photo
Glenmuick Estate, East Lodge With Gate And Gatepiers				57°02′17″N 3°03′04″W	Category C(S)	50743	Upload Photo
Glenmuik, Allt-Na-Giubhsaich, Service Cottage And Outbuilding				56°57′28″N 3°09′24″W	Category C(S)	51454	Upload Photo
Mill Of Sterin Farmhouse And Steading				57°01′22″N 3°04′25″W	Category B	9305	Upload Photo
Pananich Lodge And Hotel				57°03′29″N 2°59′56″W	Category C(S)	9321	Upload Photo
Cambus O'May Hotel Including Terraced Garden Walls And Gatepiers				57°04′03″N 2°57′22″W	Category C(S)	50730	Upload Photo
Cambus O'May, Stable Block Including Gatepiers				57°03′59″N 2°57′20″W	Category C(S)	50733	Upload Photo
Dinnet House Policies, Walled Garden				57°04′21″N 2°53′35″W	Category C(S)	50740	Upload Photo
Glenmuick Estate, House Of Glenmuick Including Walled Garden And Pavilion				57°02′19″N 3°02′07″W	Category C(S)	50745	Upload Photo
Invercauld Estate, Tullochmacarrick Farmhouse And Steading				57°05′53″N 3°11′41″W	Category C(S)	50747	Upload Photo
Birkhall, Larders				57°01′42″N 3°04′31″W	Category C(S)	51447	Upload Photo
Birkhall, Stables (Garage)				57°01′43″N 3°04′31″W	Category B	51449	Upload Photo
Birkhall With Summer House, Wendy House, Garden Gate And Terraces				57°01′44″N 3°04′27″W	Category B	9304	Upload Photo
Mill Of Sterin School And Schoolhouse				57°01′25″N 3°04′22″W	Category B	9306	Upload Photo
Cambus O'May, Aa Sentry Box (No 472) At No 42632 97618				57°03′58″N 2°56′51″W	Category C(S)	49218	Upload Photo
By Ballater, Moine-Na-Vey				57°03′33″N 3°05′24″W	Category B	50725	Upload Photo
Cambus O'May, Walled Garden				57°04′07″N 2°57′21″W	Category C(S)	50734	Upload Photo
Dinnet, Dinnet House Including Terraced Garden				57°04′08″N 2°54′35″W	Category B	50736	Upload Photo
Glenmuick Estate, Estate Office				57°02′17″N 3°02′03″W	Category C(S)	50744	Upload Photo
Glenmuick Estate, Stables And Kennels				57°02′13″N 3°02′06″W	Category C(S)	50746	Upload Photo
Dorsincilly Steading And House				57°02′04″N 3°03′59″W	Category B	51452	Upload Photo
Glengairn, Rineton, Including Ancillary Building				57°06′00″N 3°12′28″W	Category B	9296	Upload Photo
Tullich Churchyard Including Boundary Walls				57°03′53″N 3°00′24″W	Category B	9320	Upload Photo
Dinnet House Policies, North Lodge				57°04′31″N 2°54′32″W	Category C(S)	50738	Upload Photo
By Dinnet, Meikle Kinord Chapel				57°04′40″N 2°55′27″W	Category C(S)	50741	Upload Photo
Glenmuik, Allt-Na-Giubhsaich, Gig House And Stables				56°57′30″N 3°09′14″W	Category C(S)	51455	Upload Photo
By Dinnet, Deecastle, Chapel House				57°03′30″N 2°55′49″W	Category B	9290	Upload Photo
Dinnet, Clarack Farmhouse, Steading And Old Dairy				57°04′33″N 2°54′24″W	Category C(S)	9291	Upload Photo
Knock Castle				57°02′35″N 3°04′09″W	Category B	9326	Upload Photo
Cambus O'May, Moor House Including Boundary Walls, Gatepiers And Railings				57°04′18″N 2°58′15″W	Category C(S)	50732	Upload Photo
Birkhall, Keeper's House				57°01′36″N 3°04′38″W	Category B	51446	Upload Photo
Knock Steadings				57°02′37″N 3°04′15″W	Category B	51456	Upload Photo
Tullich Lodge And Sundial				57°03′49″N 3°01′10″W	Category B	9322	Upload Photo
Monaltrie Monument At No 39965 97678				57°03′58″N 2°59′30″W	Category C(S)	9327	Upload Photo
Cambus O'May, Suspension Bridge Over River Dee				57°03′57″N 2°57′24″W	Category B	9328	Upload Photo
Dinnet, The Old Kirk Including Boundary Walls And Gatepiers				57°04′33″N 2°53′35″W	Category C(S)	49414	Upload Photo
Dinnet, Bridge Over The River Dee				57°04′18″N 2°53′23″W	Category B	50735	Upload Photo
Dinnet House Policies, East Lodge, Gatepiers And Gates				57°04′31″N 2°53′33″W	Category B	50737	Upload Photo
Glenmuick Estate, Balintober Cottage				57°02′06″N 3°02′54″W	Category C(S)	50742	Upload Photo
Birkhall, Sterinbeg And Outbuilding				57°01′52″N 3°04′34″W	Category C(S)	51450	Upload Photo
Brochdu Farmhouse, Trapper's House, Ranger's House And Store				57°01′30″N 3°04′21″W	Category C(S)	51451	Upload Photo
Monaltrie House Including Well House				57°03′26″N 3°02′16″W	Category B	9317	Upload Photo
Bridge Of Gairn, Glengarden				57°03′48″N 3°04′27″W	Category C(S)	50726	Upload Photo
Cambus O'May, Kennels				57°04′07″N 2°57′19″W	Category C(S)	50731	Upload Photo
Dinnet House Policies, Stables				57°04′07″N 2°54′39″W	Category C(S)	50739	Upload Photo
Birkhall, Drive Bridge				57°01′47″N 3°04′23″W	Category C(S)	51445	Upload Photo
Loch Muick, Glas Allt Shiel With Cottage And Boat Slip				56°55′38″N 3°11′26″W	Category B	51457	Upload Photo
Glengairn, Dalphuil				57°05′37″N 3°09′31″W	Category B	9298	Upload Photo
Invermuick Bridge Over River Muick				57°02′23″N 3°02′45″W	Category C(S)	9302	Upload Photo
Pananich Upper And Lower Well Heads				57°03′27″N 2°59′56″W	Category C(S)	9324	Upload Photo
Gairnshiel Bridge Over River Gairn				57°05′36″N 3°09′55″W	Category A	6747	Upload Photo
Cambus O'May, Cambus Cottage Including Former Platform				57°04′02″N 2°57′31″W	Category C(S)	50727	Upload Photo
Cambus O'May, Heathbank Including Boundary Walls, Gatepiers And Railings				57°04′18″N 2°58′13″W	Category C(S)	50729	Upload Photo
Birkhall, Rope Bridge				57°01′09″N 3°04′21″W	Category B	51448	Upload Photo
Glenmuik, Allt-Na-Giubhsaich Cottage And Game Larder				56°57′28″N 3°09′21″W	Category B	51453	Upload Photo

== Key ==
The scheme for classifying buildings in Scotland is:

- Category A: "buildings of national or international importance, either architectural or historic; or fine, little-altered examples of some particular period, style or building type."
- Category B: "buildings of regional or more than local importance; or major examples of some particular period, style or building type, which may have been altered."
- Category C: "buildings of local importance; lesser examples of any period, style, or building type, as originally constructed or moderately altered; and simple traditional buildings which group well with other listed buildings."

In March 2016 there were 47,288 listed buildings in Scotland. Of these, 8% were Category A, and 50% were Category B, with the remaining 42% being Category C.

== See also ==
- List of listed buildings in Aberdeenshire
