= Glas-allt-Shiel =

Remote lodge in Scotland built by Victoria, Queen of the United Kingdom

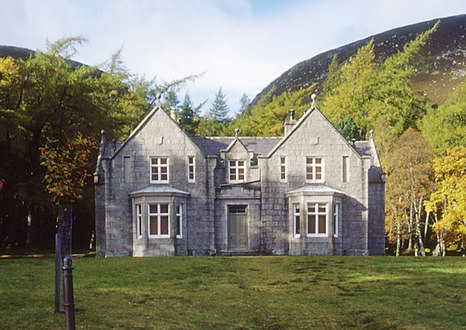
- Glas-allt-Shiel seen from the edge of Loch Muick

- Location in Aberdeenshire
- 56°55′38″N 3°11′26″W

History
- Built: 1868; 158 years ago

Listed Building – Category B
- Designated: 12 March 2010
- Reference no.: LB51457

Glas-allt-Shiel (Note: The name is spelt with differing capitalisations and hyphenations. Meaning green (or grey) stream lodge, pronounced /ˈɡlæsəlt ʃiːl/) is a lodge on the Balmoral Estate by the shore of Loch Muick in Aberdeenshire, Scotland. In its present form it was built in 1868 by Queen Victoria, who called it Glassalt, to be what she called her "widow's house" where she could escape from the world following the death of her husband Albert, Prince Consort of the United Kingdom. It is now a category B listed building owned personally by Charles III. Adam Watson considered that "Glas-allt-Shiel has undoubtedly one of the most spectacular situations of any lodge in the Highlands."

== Estate history ==
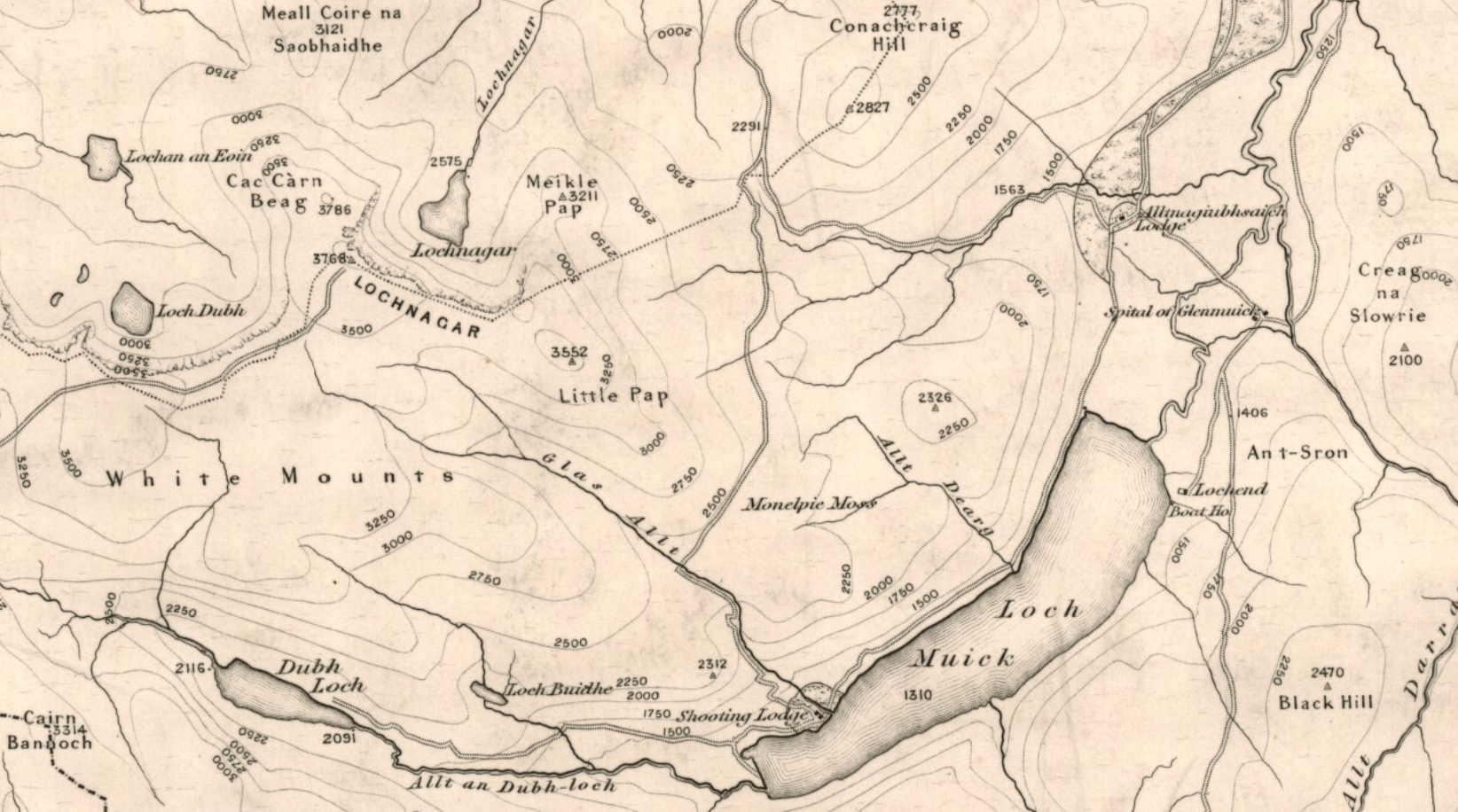
Map of Loch Muick, 1870, Glas-allt-Shiel marked "shooting lodge", bottom centre, Allt-na-giubhsaich (Alltnagiubhsaich) top right (Note: From Ordnance Survey, One-inch to the mile maps of Scotland, 1st Edition. Sheet 65, 1870)

From time immemorial, the land around Loch Muick had been owned by the Mormaer of Mar who later became the Earls of Mar. As vassals of the Crown, the Bissetts became landlords in the 13th century, followed by the Fraser family. In 1351 Sir William Keith, Great Marischal of Scotland, took ownership, followed by the Earls of Huntly, and then Clan Farquharson of Invercauld. The silk mercer Sir James McKenzie purchased it as a sporting estate in 1863. This estate was formally incorporated into the Balmoral estate by George VI between 1947 and 1951. With the Scottish Wildlife Trust, the area was established as a nature reserve in 1974, but it remains also as a sporting estate.

== The original and rebuilt dwellings and their setting ==
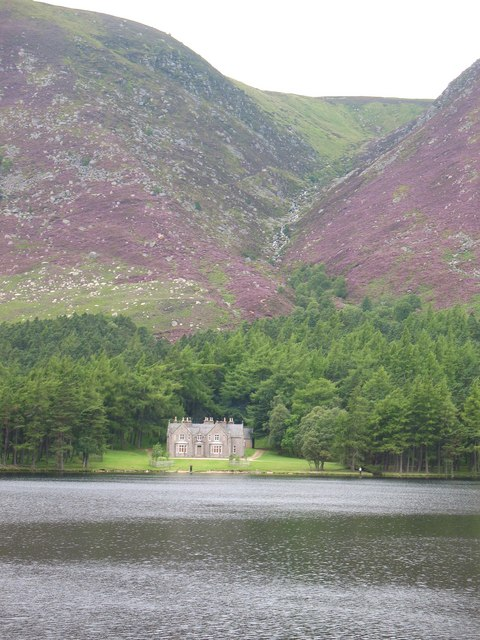
Glas Allt and Glas-allt-Shiel from across the loch

Now within the Balmoral estate, Glas Allt is a stream running down from the 1,000-metre (3,300 ft) plateau of the White Mounth, near Lochnagar. Passing over the considerable Falls of Glas Allt, the burn runs into a point near the head of Loch Muick through a relatively flat delta amidst otherwise hilly and rocky land. Here a single-storey stalker's cottage was built in 1851 for Charles Duncan, employed as an estate gillie, and his wife. This cottage seems to have had a room for royal parties and it predates the lodge of 1868. Adam Watson considered that "Glas-allt-Shiel has undoubtedly one of the most spectacular situations of any lodge in the Highlands."

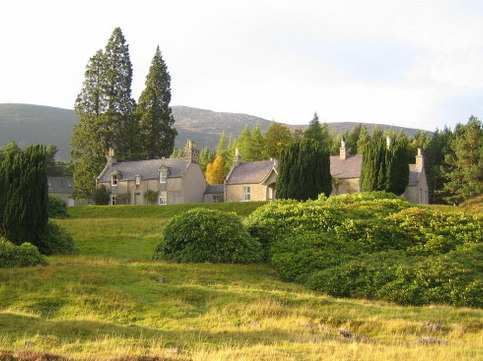
Allt-na-giubhsaich

Victoria and Albert's first visit to Balmoral was when they stayed there for the autumn of 1848. They visited the nearby hunting lodge called Allt-na-giubhsaich (Note: Victoria writes "Alt-na-Giuthasach".) near the foot of Loch Muick and in the August of the next year they stayed overnight at this lodge — in the meantime it had been extended and improved, although Victoria still regarded it as their "little bothie". By the time they stayed at the lodge the following year John Brown had become one of the queen's attendants — he was one of a team of four servants who rowed her party to the head of the loch. On 30 August 1849, she wrote about the location:

"The scenery is beautiful here, so wild and grand — real severe Highland scenery, with trees in the hollow. We had various scrambles in and out of the boat and along the shore, and saw three hawks, and caught seventy trout. I wish an artist could have been there to sketch the scene; it was picturesque — the boat, the net, and the people in their kilts in the water, and on the shore."

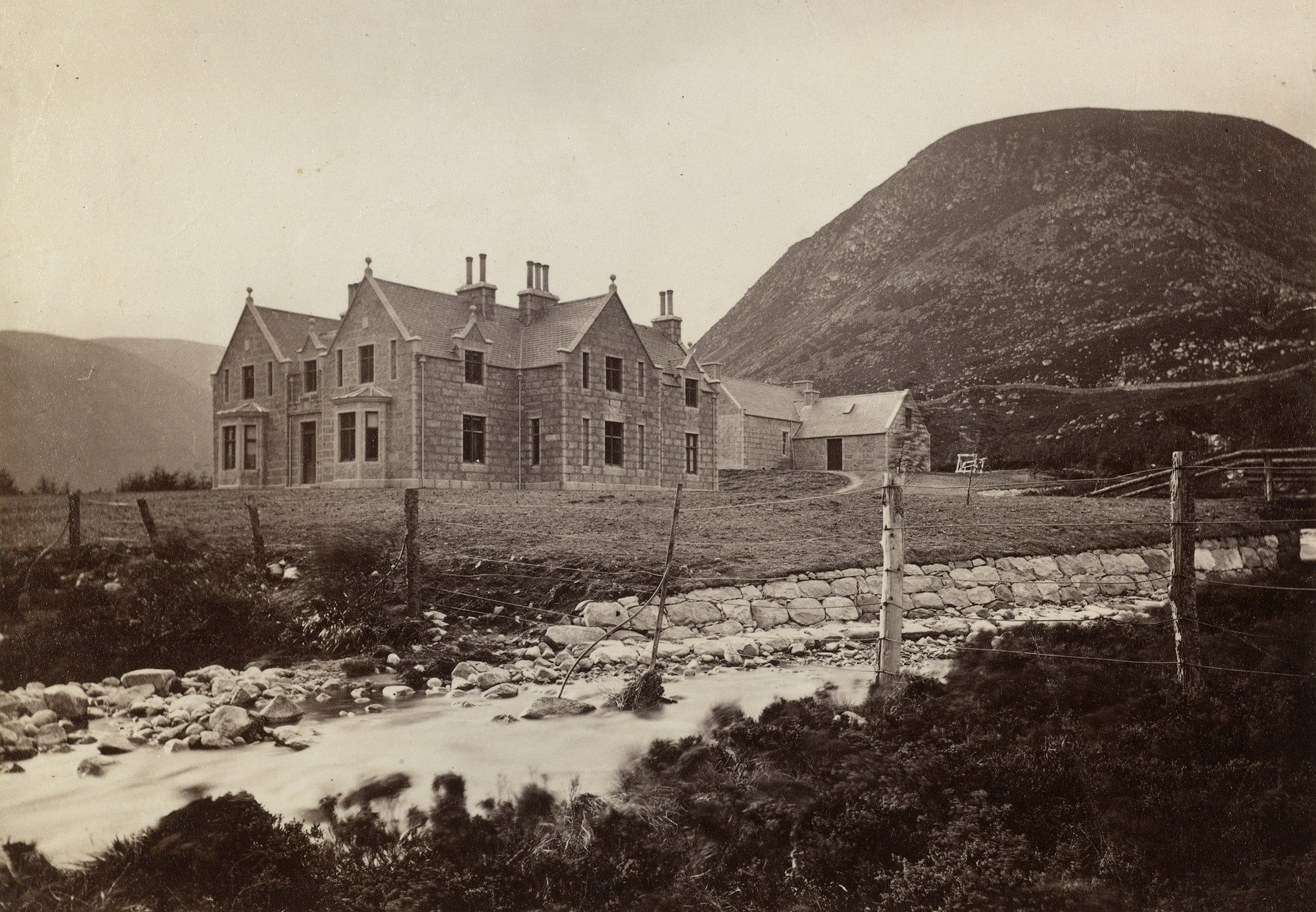
George Washington Wilson's photo of the new Glassalt, about 1870

As for the smaller and more primitive shiel, newly built for Duncan, Victoria had fallen in love with the cottage and its setting — at the time on the Abergeldie estate which was leased by Victoria and Albert. Around 1859, Victoria arranged for the Duncans to move to the foot of Glen Muick to live at Rhebreck, leaving the shiel unoccupied. By 1868 the old two-room building had been demolished, to be replaced by the present fifteen-room dressed granite residence of twin gables and bow windows looking over Loch Muick. Between 1866 and 1869, stables and a keeper's cottage and offices were added to the rear and cellars were constructed. A slipway for boats was built about 1870, between twin jetties.

It is now a category B listed building owned personally by Charles III.

== Background to Victoria's rebuilding of Glassalt ==
Queen Victoria, only twenty-one years old and newly married to Prince Albert, visited Scotland in 1842. Except for a brief visit by George IV in 1822 this was the first royal visit since the reign of Charles I. She sailed to Edinburgh and then visited Perth, Taymouth and Stirling. Both Victoria and Albert rather quickly came to love the country and the people living there. When she departed she wrote in her diary that it had been a holiday she would never forget.

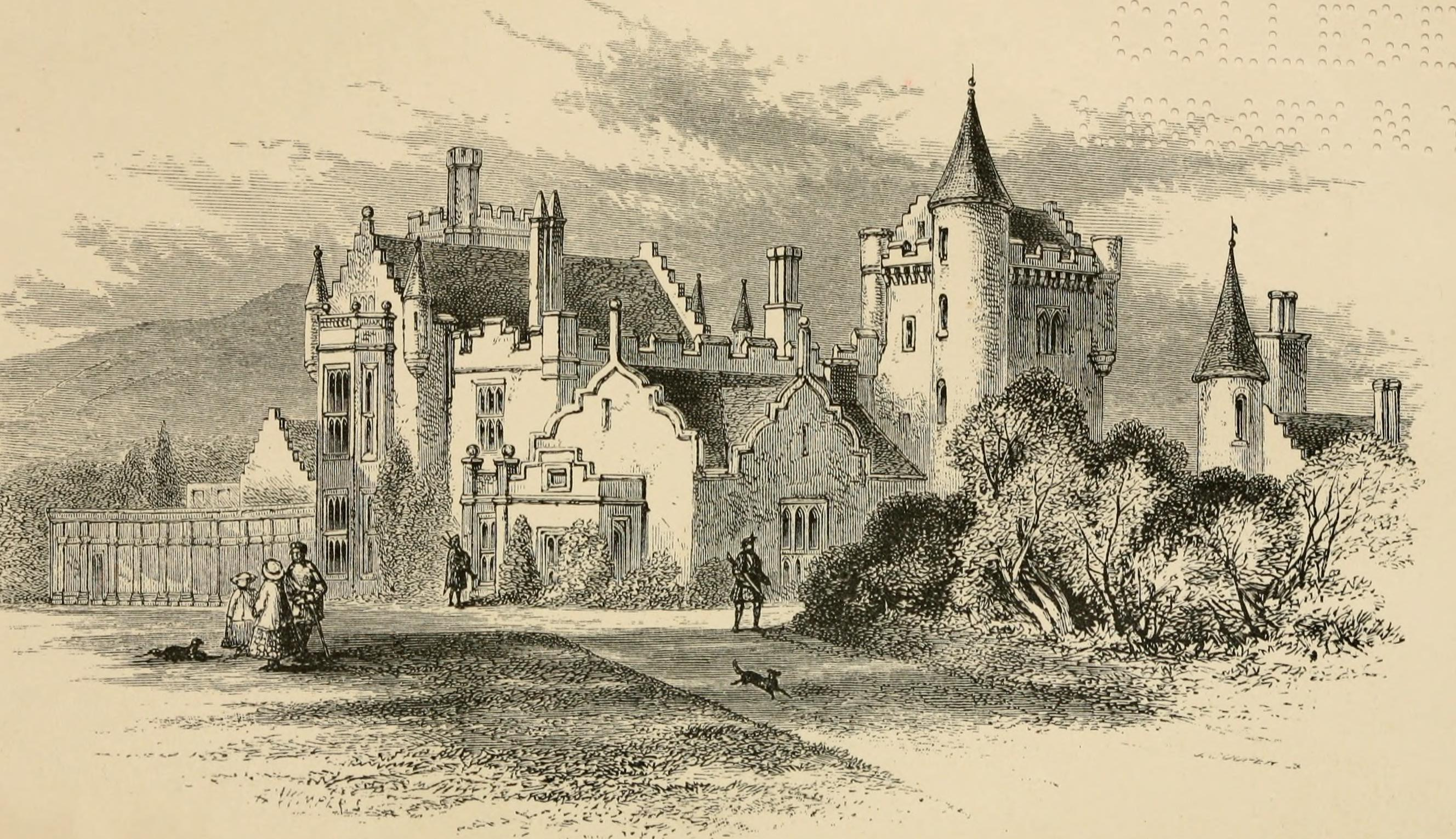
Old Balmoral Castle

Held back by the births of their children, they next visited in 1844 when they stayed at Blair Castle and then again in 1847 when they cruised along the Scottish west coast and spent three weeks at Ardverikie where the weather was exceptionally wet. The couple decided to buy a property in Scotland so they could visit regularly and, on account of Albert's rheumatism, were advised by the royal doctor, Sir James Clark, to consider Deeside where the climate is drier. Lord Aberdeen suggested Balmoral Castle, near Ballater where an unexpired lease was available. After only seeing sketches of the estate they agreed to take over the lease.

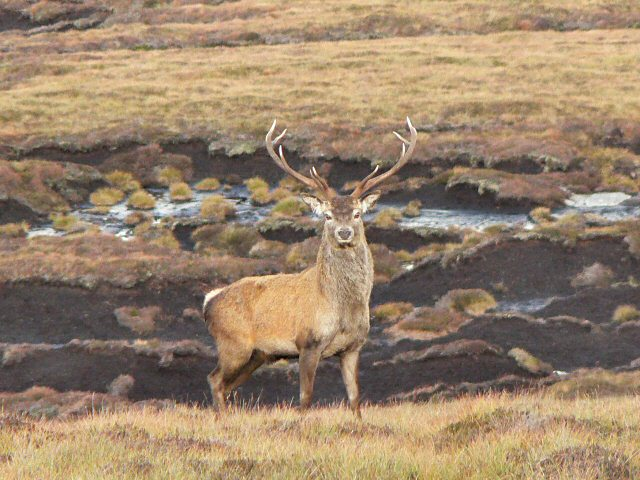
Red deer stag near Glas-allt-Shiel

In September 1848 they travelled by sea to Aberdeen, and when they arrived at Balmoral, they immediately knew they had taken the right decision. Victoria wrote in her diary "All seemed to breath freedom and peace, and to make one forget the world and its sad turmoils". Victoria could visit the local tenants and crofters who she found were not overawed by royalty. Back in England, the couple planned to purchase the estate and build a larger castle adjacent to the existing one. Albert, with deer stalking in mind, started negotiating to purchase the neighbouring estates of Abergeldie, to the east and Ballochbuie to the west. He was immediately successful in purchasing Birkhall up into the hills around Loch Muick and by 1849 was able to obtain a long-term lease for sporting rights on Abergeldie which was continually renewed until 2023.

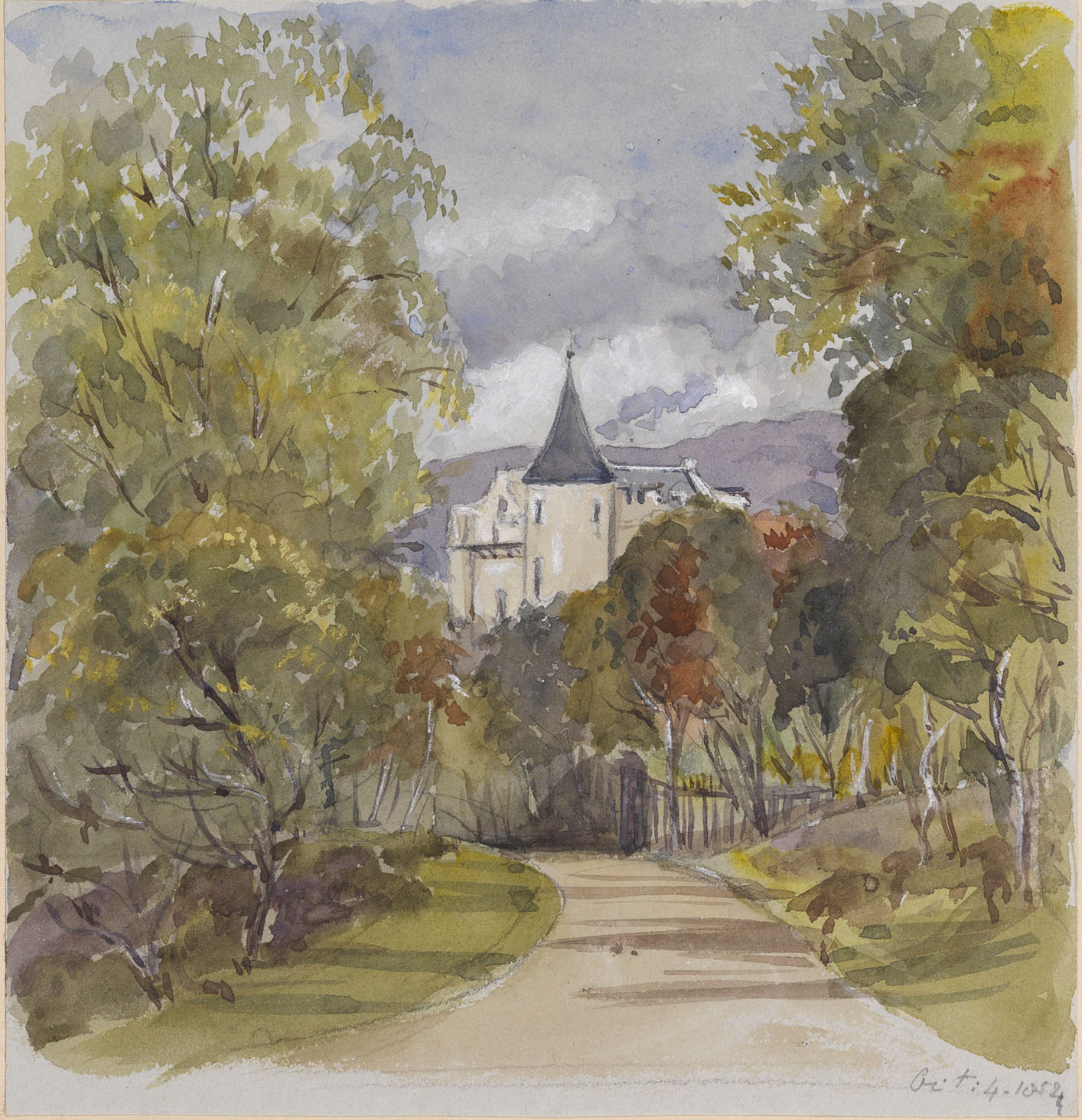
Balmoral Castle, designed but not started to be built, sketch by Victoria, 1852

It was only in 1852 that the purchase of Balmoral was agreed – 30,000 guineas for the 17,400 acres (equivalent to £4,000,000 in 2025 for 7,000 hectares) and the plans for the new castle could commence. In this Victoria was helped by a bequest of £250,000 from an eccentric barrister, John Camden Neild, who himself had been living in poverty. The purchase of the estate was made in Albert's name, however, to establish clearly that it was personal property and not that of the Crown.

Albert had been introduced to deer stalking at Taymouth back in 1840 when he was rather fortunate in successfully shooting a stag and he took up this new pastime finding that the area around Loch Muick on the estate was a good location. They had rebuilt the shooting lodge of Allt-na-giubhsaich at the foot of Loch Muick and, although Victoria did not go hunting, she liked visiting there to relax away from visiting dignitaries and to do painting.

Albert died of typhoid in 1861 and this was a bitter blow for Victoria. She visited Balmoral for solace but all the time she was reminded of Albert. She could escape the world at Allt-na-guibhsaich but could not bear living there because of its earlier happy associations. However, there was another lodge at the head of the loch, a smaller one, and she decided to get this extended to convert it into a "widow's house".

== Glassalt in Victoria's journals ==
=== Journals ===
Of Victoria's journals, 111 volumes survive that were transcribed (and expurgated) by her daughter Beatrice and are accessible online. In her lifetime Victoria published two books containing small selections of entries: Leaves from the Journal of our Life in the Highlands (1868) dedicated to her late husband, covering 1848 to 1861 and More Leaves from the Journal ... (1884) dealing with the years after Albert's death – 1862 to 1882. In the second volume Victoria was in doubly deep mourning – she dedicated this volume to "my loyal Highlanders and especially to the memory of my devoted personal attendant John Brown", who had died a few months earlier. After transcription her original manuscripts were destroyed on her instructions but a few drafts in her handwriting remain — the entry of 22 September 1855 mentions Glassalt and an image is available online.

=== Gillie's cottage ===
In 1851 Victoria wrote from Glas-allt-Shiel:

"Here I am, writing in our little lovely hut. ... We rowed up to the head of the Lake & landed at the foot of the Glassalt, where a charming little lodge has been built for Duncan (now one of our Keepers), & there is a little room for us. It is nearly finished. A lovelier, milder, or more romantic spot cannot be imagined. Albert says it is quite a spot for the 'Lady of the Lake' to dwell in."

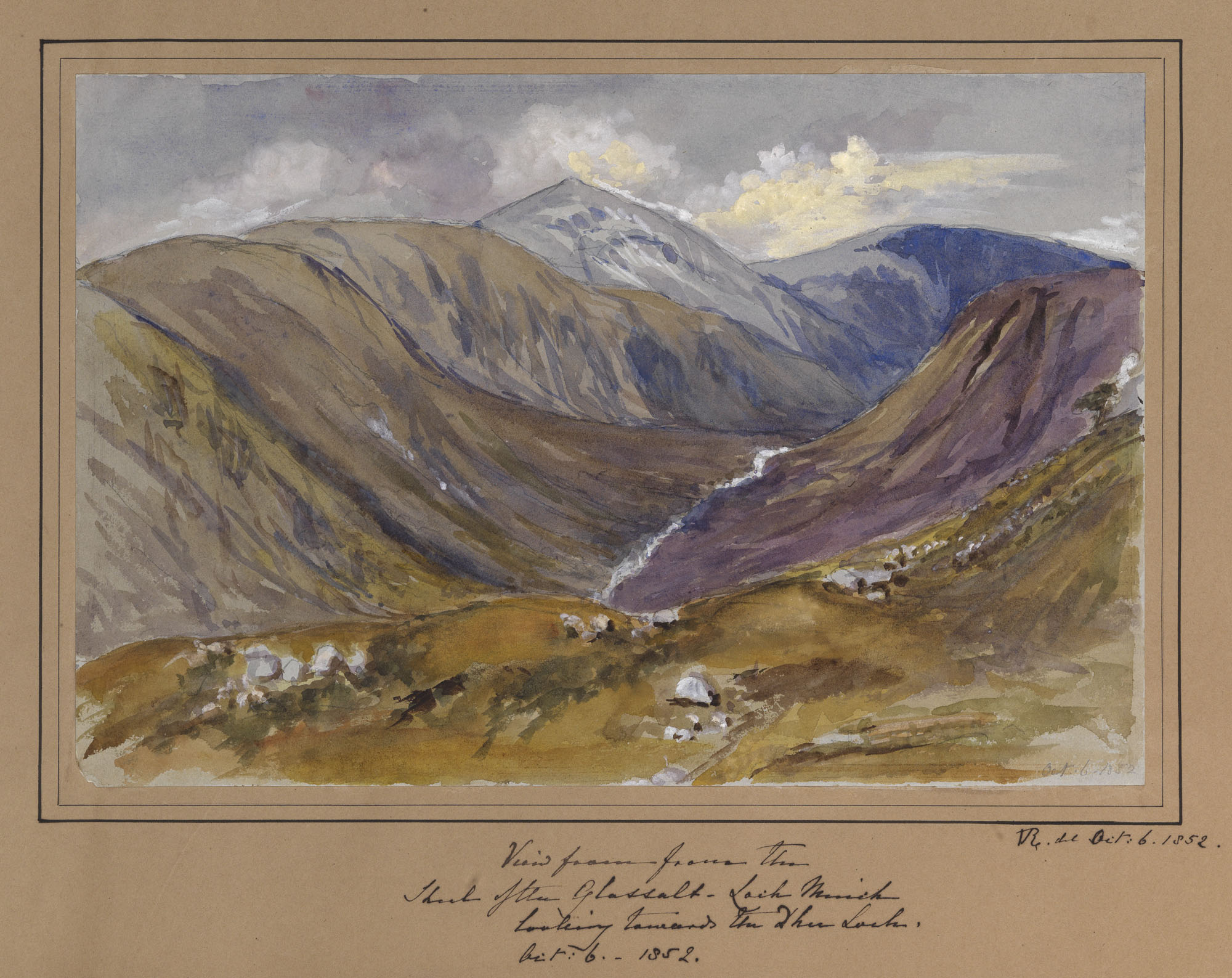
Sketch by Victoria, 6 October 1852, from "Shiel of the Glassalt" looking towards Dubh Loch

In the entry for 16 September 1852 in Victoria's Leaves from the Journal she describes pony riding and walking from Allt-na-giubhsaich to 500 feet (150 m) above the loch and then descending Glas Allt past the 150-foot (46 m) waterfall and stopping at Glas-allt-Shiel for a packed lunch in a "charming room ... [with] ... a most lovely view".

In September 1859 the Duncans moved house from Glassalt to Rhebreck and a few days later Victoria records that her son the Prince of Wales (later Edward VII) stayed the night at Glassalt where a bed had been prepared for him.

=== Rebuilt lodge ===
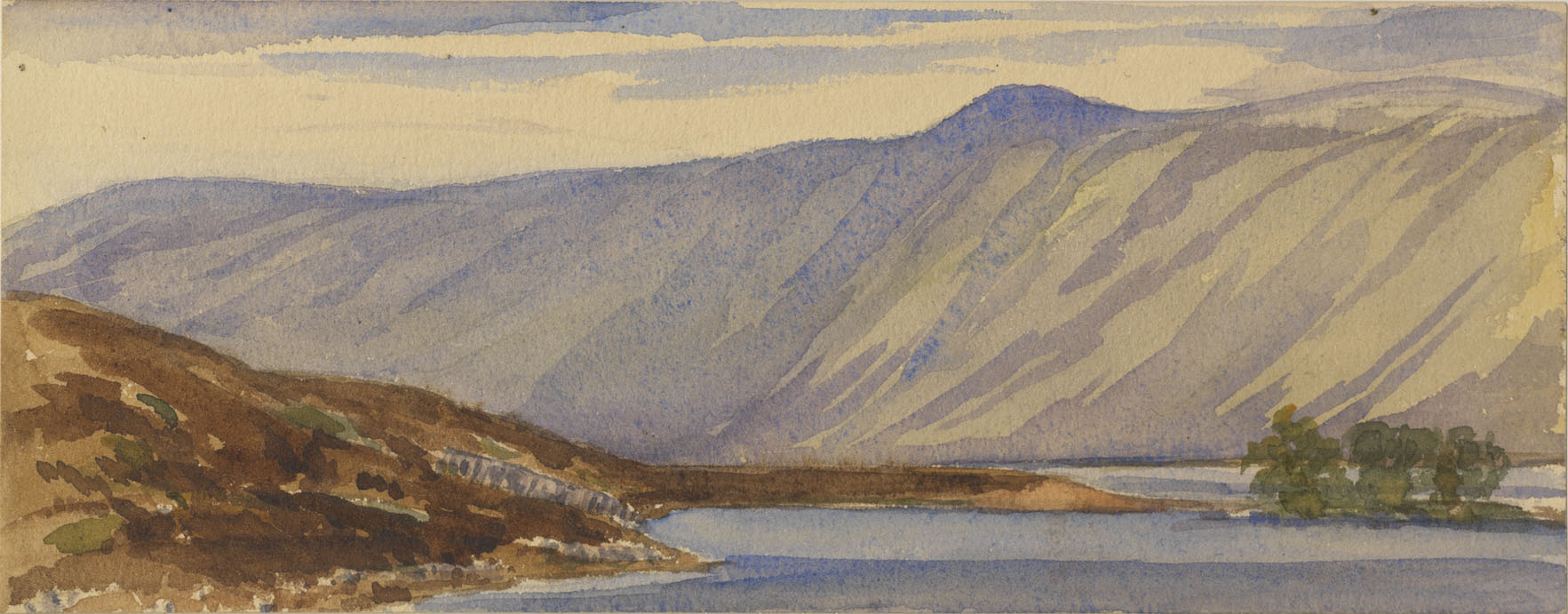
Victoria's 12 October 1867 sketch of Loch Muick from Glas-allt-Shiel

In October 1868, with the rebuilding of the lodge largely complete:

"Reached the Glassalt Sheil at half past 6. It looked so cheerful & comfortable, all lit up & the little rooms are so cosy & nice. The Dining room is on the one side of the little entrance hall, my sitting room, on the other & my bedroom &c – beyond. In it stands the old bed & wardrobe in our former little bedroom at Alt na Guithasach. Upstairs the rooms are equally comfortable. Felt sad & lonely, thinking of the blessed happy past with dearest Albert, who always had wished to build here, in this favourite spot. I could not have lived again at Alt na Guithasach now, alone, & it is far better to have built a totally new house, but the sad thought struck me, that it was the first widow's house, – not blessed by him."

With five of her children and her Lady of the Bedchamber Jane Spencer, Baroness Churchill, Victoria held a house warming party and then they stayed for the night. (Note: Those present included her children Helena, Louise, Arthur, Leopold and Beatrice. Victoria's first grandchild Christian, Helena's baby, was also there. Brown and Ross, another servant, served the meal.)

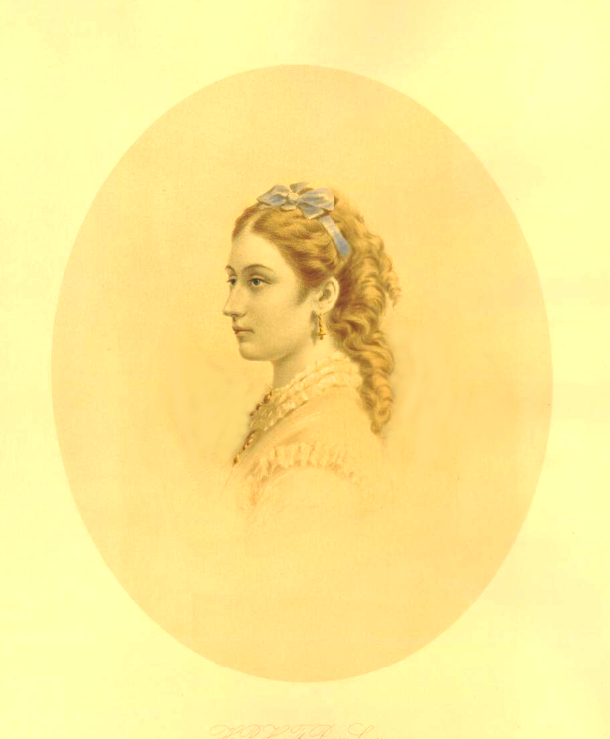
Princess Louise, 1870 lithograph based on 1868 photograph

During her Highland sojourns Victoria visited Glas-allt-Shiel every year up to and including 1900. She and her ladies often took lunch on the grass outside and sketched, while Albert and the men went deer stalking. Rain and midges could, however, force them indoors. The gillies often were able to catch large numbers of trout from the loch which made for fine meals, and dances were held with servants and gillies joining in. There was a piano that Victoria liked to play, particularly playing duets with her youngest daughter Beatrice.

On 3 October 1870: "Louise had gone with Janie, E., the Lord Chancellor, & Lord Lorne to Loch Muich & the Glassalt. They returned some time after I got home, & Louise came to speak to me & tell me, that while walking up to the Dhu Loch, Lord Lorne had told her of his feelings for her & had in fact proposed to her, & Knowing that I would approve & liked him, she had accepted him. I embraced her & gave her my blessing, but felt greatly agitated. I was not unprepared but did not expect it would come so quick. Of course nothing can be said till Lorne has heard from his Parents." (Note: Louise was her daughter; Janie was Jane, Marchioness of Ely; the Lord Chancellor at the time was William Wood, 1st Baron Hatherley; Lord Lorne was the Marquess of Lorne. The Dhu Loch, now Dubh Loch is a small lake whose outflow is to Loch Muick quite near Glas-allt-Shiel.)

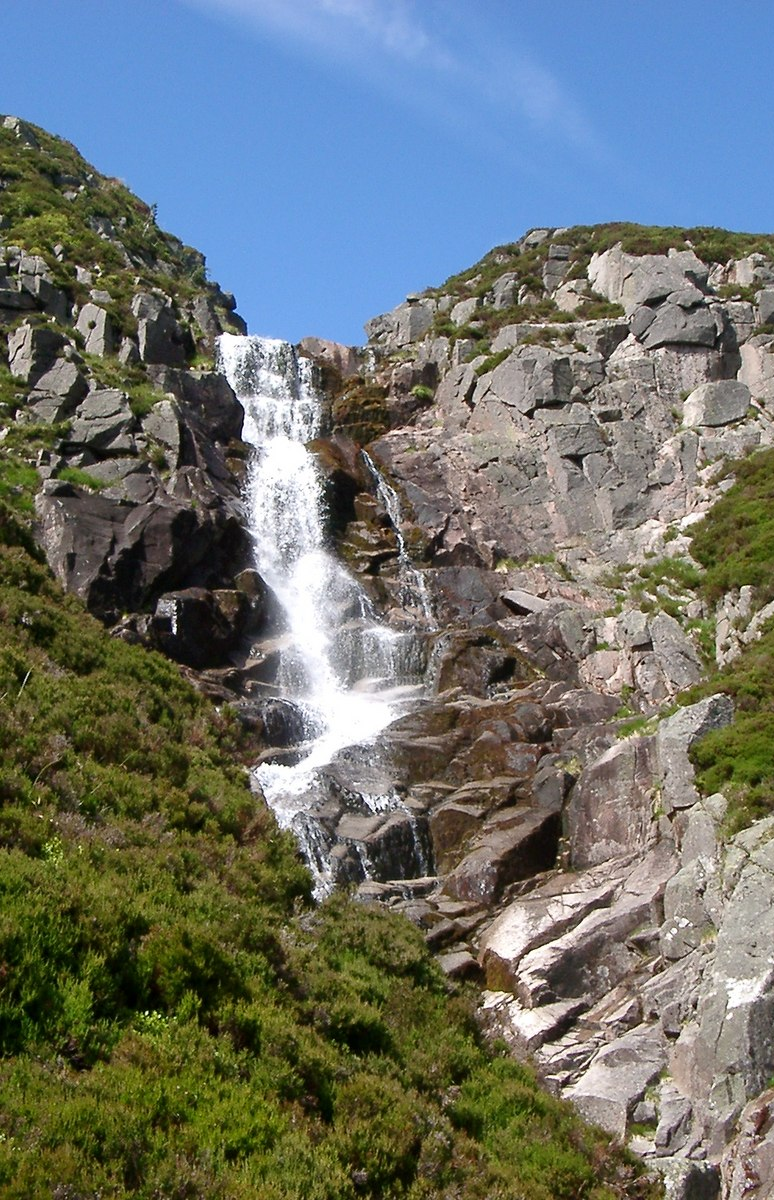
Falls of Glas Allt

In 1874: "Another, if possible, still more beautiful day, after a slight frost. – After writing started at 11 with Beatrice to try & walk up to the falls of the Glassalt, which I had not done since 20 years! There was not a breath of wind & a very powerful sun. I managed to get up & was wonderfully little out of breath. Brown helped me up the steepest parts, which are rather trying. The falls were not particularly full, but always very fine. I walked up to the very top, just above, them, & rested a little on the heather. The descent was far easier, but the path was very rough in parts & I had recourse to Brown's strong arm to steady me. It is 4 miles to the top & back, & I felt quite proud, that I could accomplish it so well. – In the afternoon drove with Beatrice & Janie E. nearly as far as Birkhall & back, taking our tea at the Linn of Muich. A splendid frosty evening." Likewise in 1877: "Walked with Beatrice up to the top of the Glassalt falls, where the icicles where hanging from the stones, & rocks. It was a hard pull up, but we came down quickly."

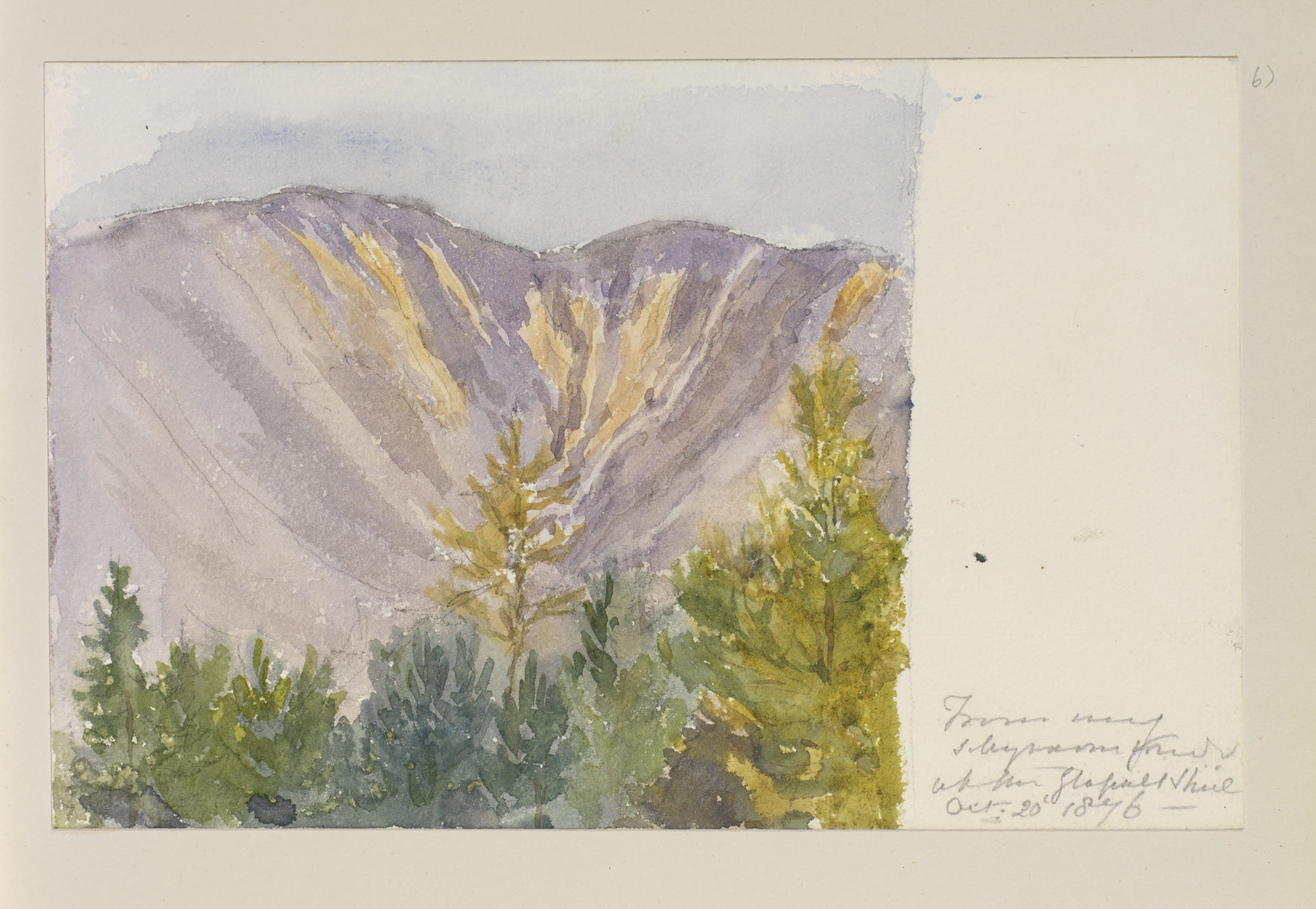
Victoria's sketch of the view from her Glas-allt-Shiel sitting room window, 20 October 1876

In time Victoria was happiest living at her remote lodge, writing from Balmoral in 1873 "Felt quite lost in my big sitting room, after the snug little one at the Glassalt." In 1874 again from Glassalt: "Working, reading & writing, after coming home. Dinner as usual, then Beatrice played on the piano. Cannot bear the thought of going away & not returning for another year!", and in 1877: "We left with regret the dear little Glassalt Shiel at half past 12. The house at Balmoral felt so cold & large, after the snug warm Shiel."

After the death of John Brown in 1883 Victoria was not able to face living in the shiel though she still often visited it. However, in 1887 Victoria found a new companion, Abdul Karim, the Munshi, and by 1889 she was again able to stay at the cottage, with him as her attendant, despite wide disapproval. Her last visit to Glassalt before her death turned out to be on 13 September 1900: "Drove in the afternoon with Irène & May to the Glassalt, where we met the rest of the family, some of whom had been up Lochnagar, & we had tea together. It was a beautiful evening but became rather chilly ..." (Note: Irène was the daughter of Victoria's deceased daughter Alice. May was later to become Queen Mary, consort of George V.)

== Bothy ==
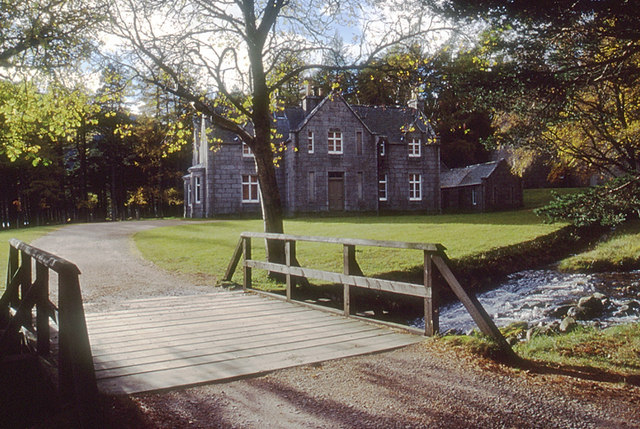
Glas Allt in the foreground with the lodge behind. The bothy is reached down the passageway between the rear of the lodge and the outhouse (right).

Since 1991 an outhouse at the back of the lodge was maintained by Dundee University Rucksack Club as an open bothy until in 2019 it passed to the Mountain Bothies Association – it is a good base for climbing Lochnagar. Equipped with a stove and a composting toilet (as well as a candelabra) it used to be a storeroom. However, there is no electricity, the water supply is from the Glas Allt very near by, and there is no fuel unless it has been left by previous users. The bothy was available to anyone free of charge for overnight stays until 2020 when it was closed for an indefinite period on account of misuse. The bothy has subsequently been reopened and is now available as previously. Up until that time, when royal parties were visiting the lodge backpackers were still allowed to stay in the bothy but they were asked to keep discreetly out of the way.

== See also ==
- Shieling
