= Balmoral cairns =

Cairns on the Balmoral estate in Scotland

Coordinates: 57.024°N 3.252°W

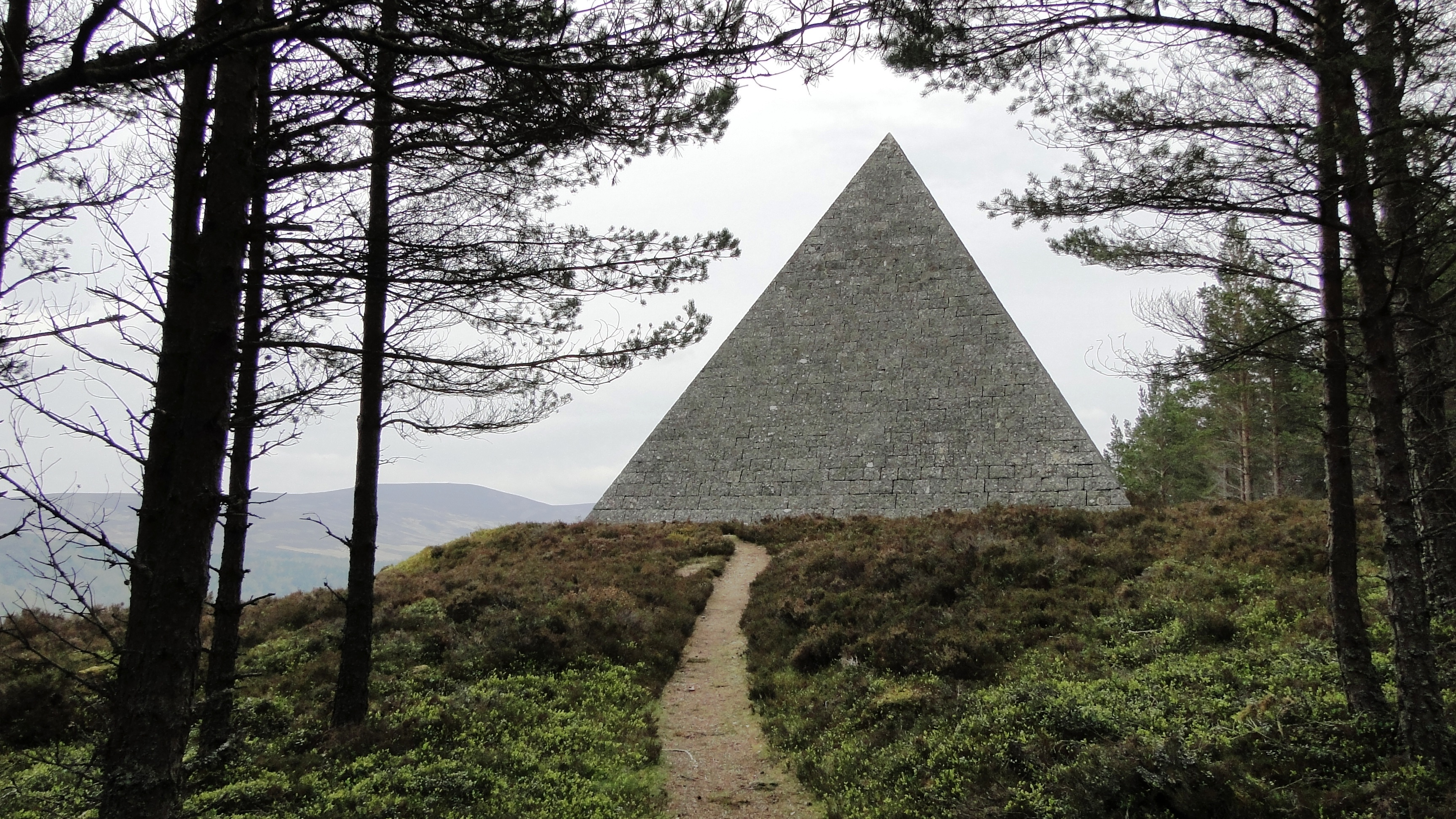
Cairn commissioned by Queen Victoria for Prince Albert

There are sixteen stone cairns on the Balmoral estate in Deeside, Scotland, including a single cairn on the adjoining Birkhall estate. The cairns commemorate members of the British royal family and events in their lives. The majority of the cairns were erected by Queen Victoria.

== Cairns dedicated to Victoria's children ==
The cairns commemorate the marriages of Victoria's children, of the Princess Royal (to Frederick, Crown Prince of Prussia in 1858) located on Canup, Prince Albert Edward located on the Coyles of Muick, Princess Alice, Princess Helena, Princess Louise, Prince Arthur, Prince Leopold all located on Craig Gowan and Princess Beatrice located at the bottom of Creag an Lurachain. Victoria's son Prince Alfred's cairn is located on Ripe Hill.

== Cairn dedicated to Victoria's mother ==
The Duchess of Kent's Cairn, Queen Victoria's mother, is located near Sgor an h-lolaire.

== Cairns dedicated to Victoria's husband and to John Brown ==
The largest cairn was erected by Victoria in memory of her husband Prince Albert after his death in 1861. The Ballochbuie Cairn marks the purchase by Victoria of the Ballochbuie forest in 1878. A cairn to commemorate John Brown was erected by Victoria after Brown's death, it was later removed at the behest of Edward VII who disliked Brown and later replaced with his statue.

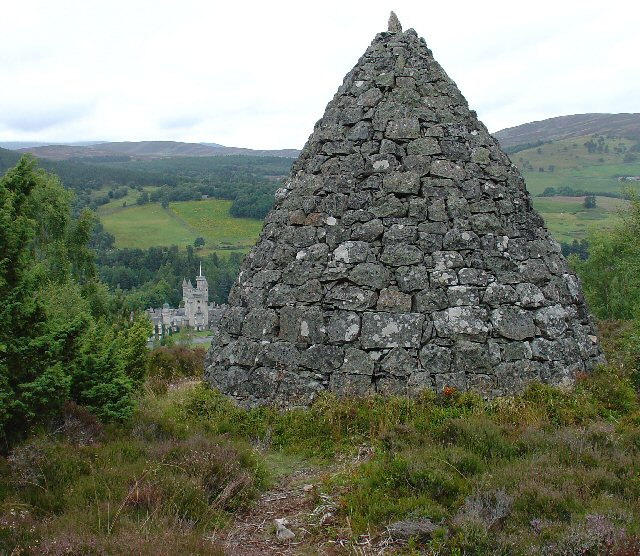
Cairn erected in 1882 to commemorate the marriage of Prince Leopold with Balmoral Castle in the background

== Cairns dedicated to Elizabeth II ==
Two cairns were constructed to mark the Diamond Jubilee of Elizabeth II in 2012. 60 stones, one for each year of Elizabeth's reign, were laid in the village of Ballater, with the main stone from a local quarry in Inver. A second cairn was erected on the Balmoral estate within the grounds and unveiled by the Queen on 8 August 2012, having been under construction since May.

The cairn was constructed by two drystack master 'dykers', Norman Haddow and William Crooks Cassidy, and was a gift to the Queen from her Scottish Warrant Holders and current and former employees of Balmoral. The cairn is marked with an etched slate plaque with the Queen's initials and the date, made by carver Gillian Forbes. The cairn was surmounted with a top stone found in a river, and 10-year-old malt whisky was poured over the final stone upon the cairn's completion.
