= Glenmuick =

Parish in Scotland

Coordinates: 56.983°N 3.118°W

Glenmuick (/ɡlɛnˈmɪk/ glen-MICK) is a glen and a former parish in Scotland. Places in the area include Birkhall, Culsh, Deecastle, Inchnabobart, and Spittal of Glenmuick. From Aberdeen city, Glenmuick is to west.

The parish was combined with the parishes of Tullich and Glengairn to form the combined parish of Glenmuick, Tullich and Glengairn.

In the Cairngorms National Park, there is an old and decorative House of Glenmuick in the middle of the park. The estate is surrounded with gardens. Loch Muick and Loch Lee are nearby.

The Mackenzie baronets of Glen Muick derive their title from the glen.
