= Balmoral Castle =

Royal residence in Aberdeenshire, Scotland

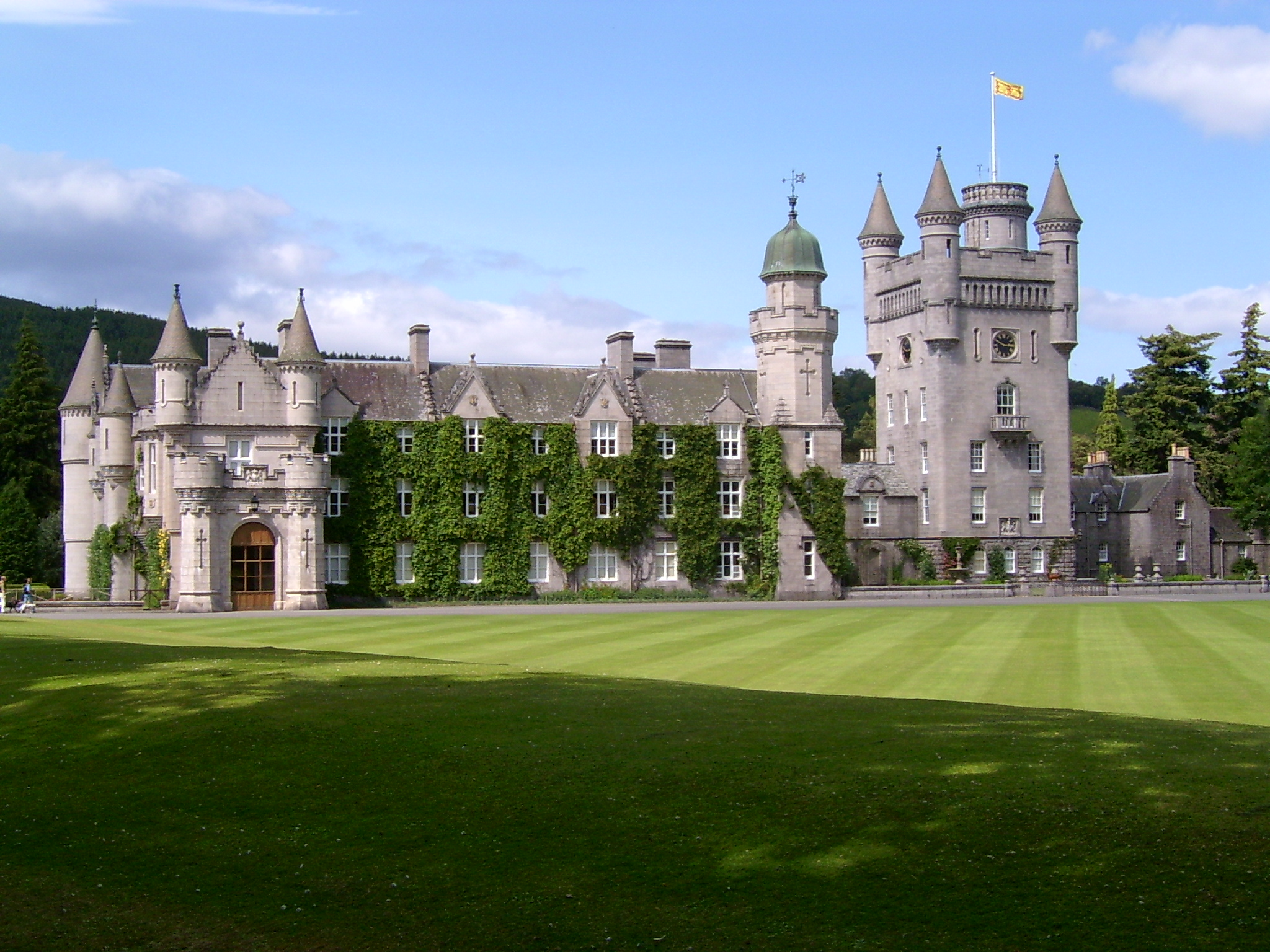
- Balmoral Castle from the south lawn

General information
- Status: Completed
- Type: Royal residence
- Architectural style: Scots baronial revival
- Location: Aberdeenshire, Balmoral Estate; Ballater; AB35 5TB, Scotland
- Coordinates: 57°2′27″N 3°13′48″W
- Construction started: 1853; 173 years ago
- Completed: 1856; 170 years ago
- Owner: King Charles III

Height
- Architectural: 100 ft 0 in (30.48 m) (Great Tower)

Technical details
- Material: Granite and slate
- Floor count: Largely two- and three-storey

Design and construction
- Architect: William Smith (City Architect of Aberdeen)
- Developer: Queen Victoria and Prince Albert
- Other designers: John Thomas (Sculptor)
- Main contractor: M. Stuart

Website
- www.balmoralcastle.com

Listed Building – Category A
- Official name: Balmoral Castle with Parterre and Terrace Walls
- Designated: 12 March 2010
- Reference no.: LB51460

Inventory of Gardens and Designed Landscapes in Scotland
- Official name: Balmoral Castle
- Designated: 1 July 1987
- Reference no.: GDL00045

Balmoral Castle (/bælˈmɒrəl/ bal-MORR-əl) is a large estate house in Aberdeenshire, Scotland, and a residence of the British royal family. It is near the village of Crathie, 9 miles (14 km) west of Ballater and 50 miles (80 km) west of Aberdeen.

The estate and its original castle were bought from the Farquharson family in 1852 by Prince Albert, the husband of Queen Victoria. Soon afterwards, it was found that the house was too small, and the current Balmoral Castle was commissioned. The architect was William Smith of Aberdeen, and his designs were amended by Prince Albert. Balmoral is the private property of King Charles III, and is not part of the Crown Estate. It was the summer residence of Queen Elizabeth II, who died there on 8 September 2022.

The castle is an example of Scottish baronial architecture, and is classified by Historic Environment Scotland as a category A listed building. The new castle was completed in 1856, and the old castle demolished shortly thereafter.

Successive members of the royal family have added to the Balmoral Estate, and now it covers an area of 53,680 acres (21,725 ha) of land. It is a working estate, including grouse moors, forestry and farmland, as well as managed herds of deer, Highland cattle, sheep and ponies.

== Etymology ==
Balmoral is pronounced /bælˈmɒrəl/ or sometimes locally /bəˈmɒrəl/. It was first recorded as 'Bouchmorale' in 1451, and it was pronounced [baˈvɔrəl] by local Scottish Gaelic speakers. The first element in the name is thought to be the Gaelic both, meaning "a hut", but the second part is uncertain. Adam Watson and Elizabeth Allan wrote in The Place Names of Upper Deeside that the second part meant "big spot (of ground)". Alexander MacBain suggested this was originally the Pictish *mor-ial, "big clearing" (cf. Welsh mawr-ial). Alternatively, the second part could be a saint's name.

== History ==
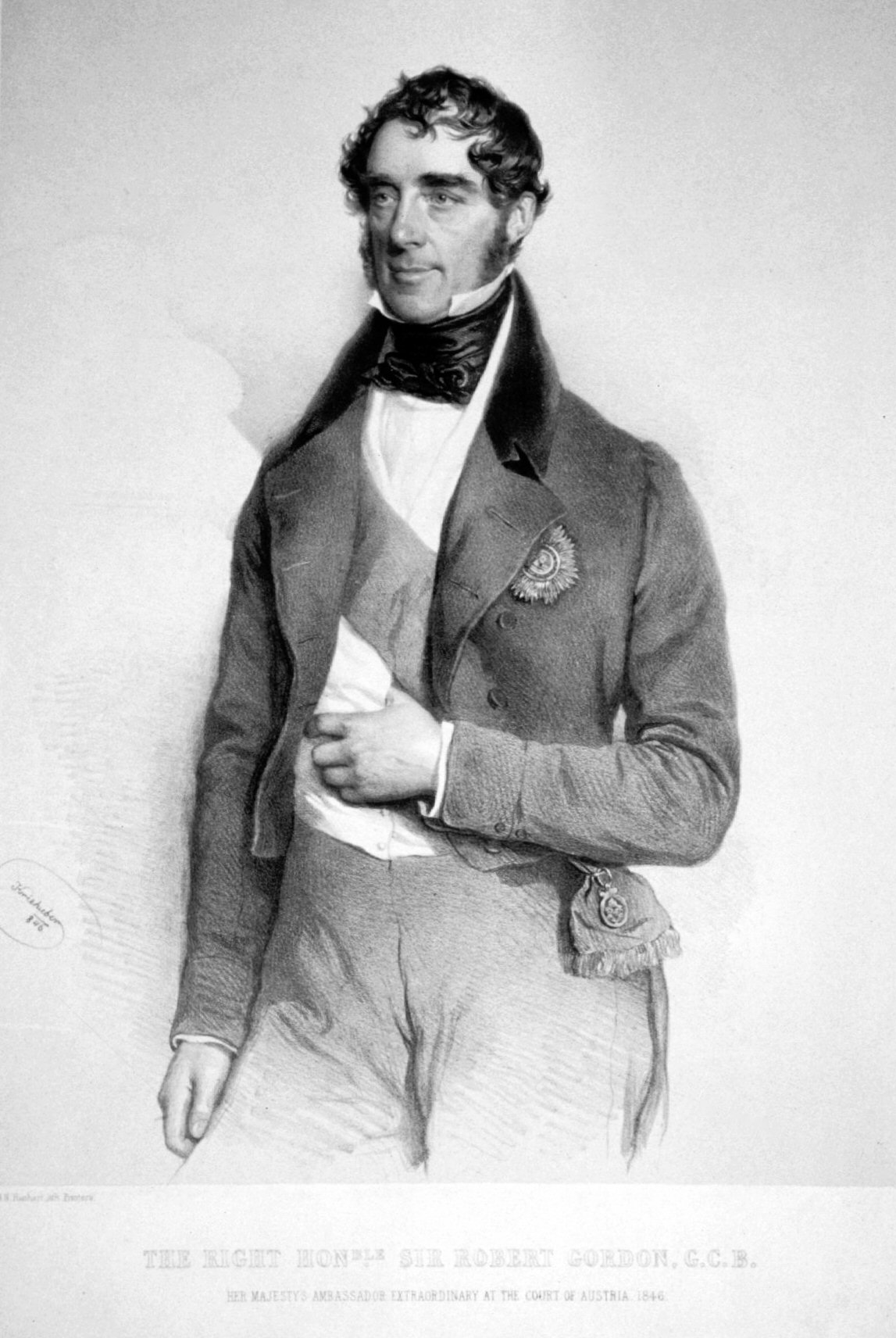
After 1830, Sir Robert Gordon made major alterations to the original castle.

King Robert II of Scotland (1316–1390) had a hunting lodge in the area. Historical records also indicate that a house at Balmoral was built by Sir William Drummond in 1390. The estate was later tenanted by Alexander Gordon, second son of the 1st Earl of Huntly. A tower house was built on the estate by the Gordons.

In 1662, the estate passed to Charles Farquharson of Inverey, brother of John Farquharson, the "Black Colonel". The Farquharsons were Jacobite sympathisers, and James Farquharson of Balmoral was involved in both the 1715 and 1745 Jacobite risings. He was wounded at the Battle of Falkirk (1746). The Farquharson estates were forfeited and passed to the Farquharsons of Auchendryne. In 1798, James Duff, 2nd Earl Fife, acquired Balmoral and leased the castle. Sir Robert Gordon, a younger brother of George Gordon, 4th Earl of Aberdeen, acquired the lease in 1830. He made major alterations to the original castle at Balmoral, including baronial-style extensions that John Smith of Aberdeen designed.

=== Royal acquisition ===
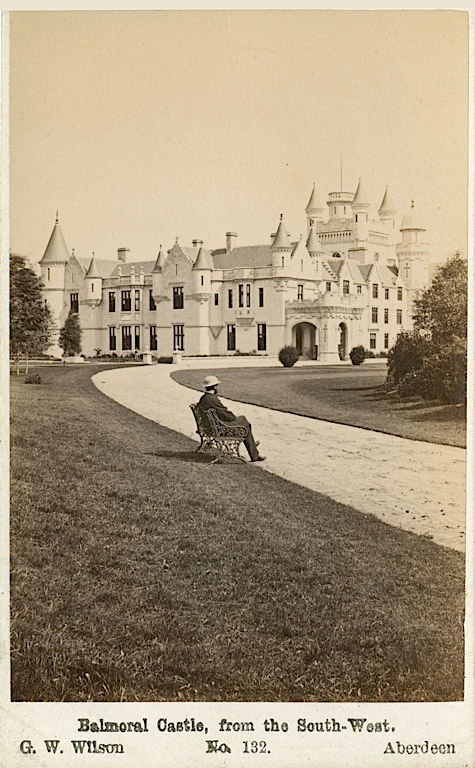
Balmoral Castle, 1860s, albumen print carte de visite

Queen Victoria and Prince Albert first visited Scotland in 1842, five years after she acceded to the throne and two years after their marriage. During this first visit they stayed at Edinburgh, and at Taymouth Castle in Perthshire, the home of John Campbell, 2nd Marquess of Breadalbane. They returned in 1844 to stay at Blair Castle. In 1847, they rented Ardverikie House by Loch Laggan. Frequent rain during the trip led Sir James Clark, the queen's doctor, to recommend Deeside instead, for its healthier climate.

Sir Robert Gordon died in 1847, and his lease on Balmoral reverted to Lord Aberdeen. In February 1848, an arrangement was made for Prince Albert to acquire the remaining part of the lease on Balmoral, along with its furniture and staff, without having seen the property first.

The royal couple arrived for their first visit on 8 September 1848. Victoria found the house "small but pretty", and recorded in her diary that: "All seemed to breathe freedom and peace, and to make one forget the world and its sad turmoils". The surrounding hilly landscape reminded them of Thuringia, Albert's homeland in Germany.

The house was soon deemed too small, and in 1848, John and William Smith were commissioned to design new offices, cottages, and other ancillary buildings. Improvements to the woodlands, gardens and estate buildings were also being made, with the assistance of the landscape gardener James Beattie, and possibly the painter James Giles.

Major additions to the old house were considered in 1849, but by then negotiations were underway to purchase the estate from James Duff, 4th Earl Fife. After seeing a corrugated iron cottage at the Great Exhibition of 1851, Prince Albert ordered a prefabricated iron building for Balmoral from E. T. Bellhouse & Co., to serve as a temporary ballroom and dining room. It was in use by 1 October 1851, and would serve as a ballroom until 1856.

The sale was completed in June 1852, the price being £32,000 (equivalent to £3,900,000 in 2025) and Prince Albert formally took possession that autumn. The neighbouring estate of Birkhall was also purchased at the same time, and the lease on Abergeldie Castle was secured accordingly. To mark the occasion, the Purchase Cairn was erected in the hills overlooking the castle, the first of many cairns on the estate.

=== Construction of the new house ===
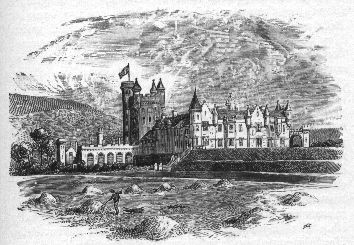
Balmoral Castle – a principal keep similar to that of Craigievar Castle is the central feature of the castle, while a large turreted country house is attached.

Space was needed for the growing family of Victoria and Albert, for additional staff, and for accommodation for visiting friends and official visitors such as cabinet members. Thus, extension of the existing structure would not provide enough space, and a larger house needed to be built. In early 1852, this was commissioned from William Smith. The son of John Smith (who designed the 1830 alterations of the original castle), William Smith, was the city architect of Aberdeen from 1852. On learning of the commission, William Burn sought an interview with the prince, apparently to complain that Smith previously had plagiarised his work; however, Burn was unsuccessful in depriving Smith of the appointment. William Smith's designs were amended by Prince Albert, who took a close interest in details such as turrets and windows.

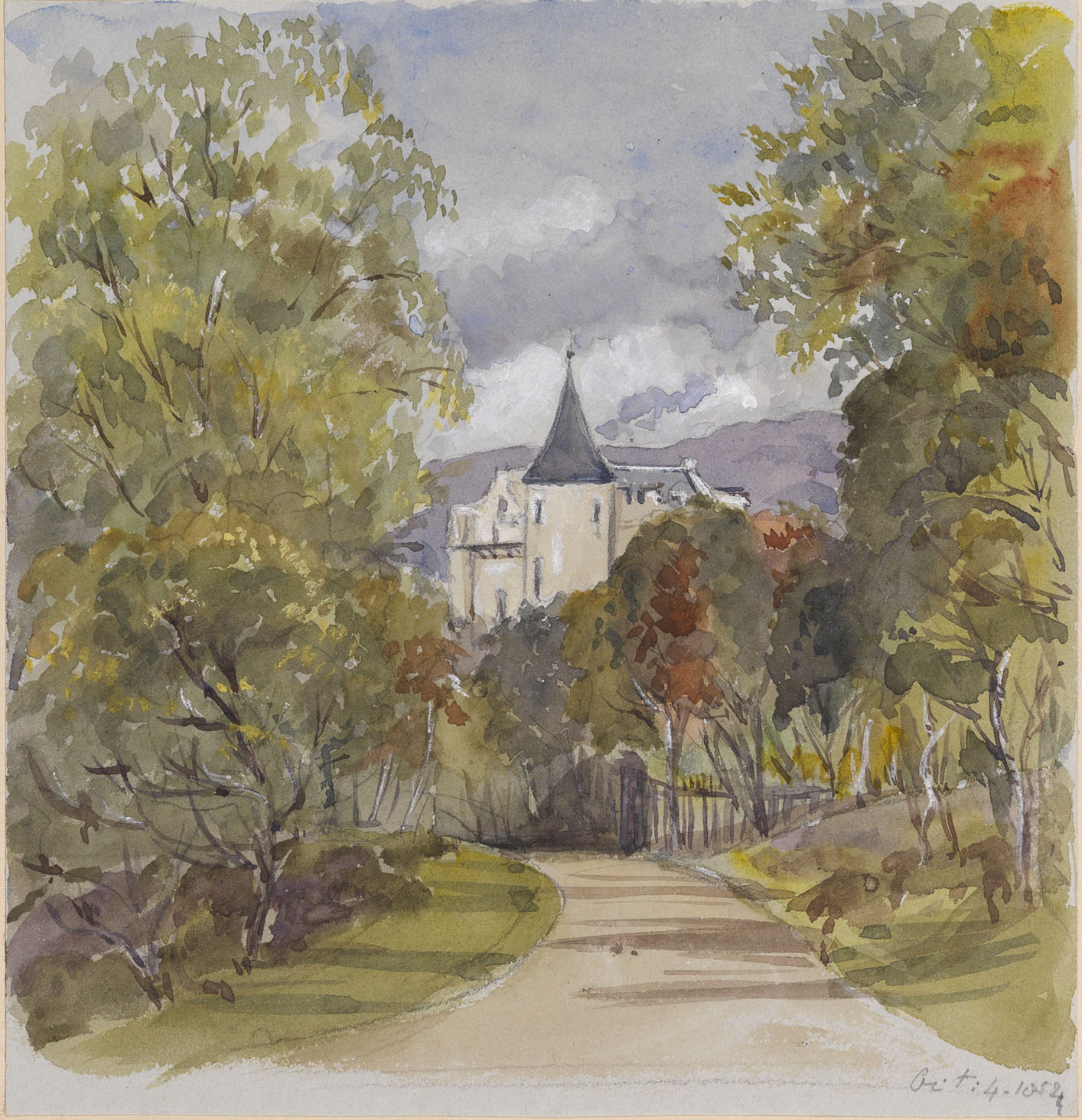
Balmoral Castle, painted by Queen Victoria in 1854 during its construction

Construction began in mid-1853 on a site some 100 yards (90 metres) northwest of the original building, chosen for its better vista. Another consideration was that during construction, the family would still be able to use the old house. Queen Victoria laid the foundation stone on 28 September 1853, during her annual autumn visit. By the autumn of 1855, the royal apartments were ready for occupancy, although the tower was still under construction and the servants had to be lodged in the old house. By coincidence, shortly after they arrived at the estate that autumn, news circulated about the fall of Sevastopol, ending the Crimean War, resulting in wild celebrations by royalty and locals alike. While visiting the estate soon afterwards, Prince Frederick of Prussia asked for the hand of Victoria, Princess Royal.

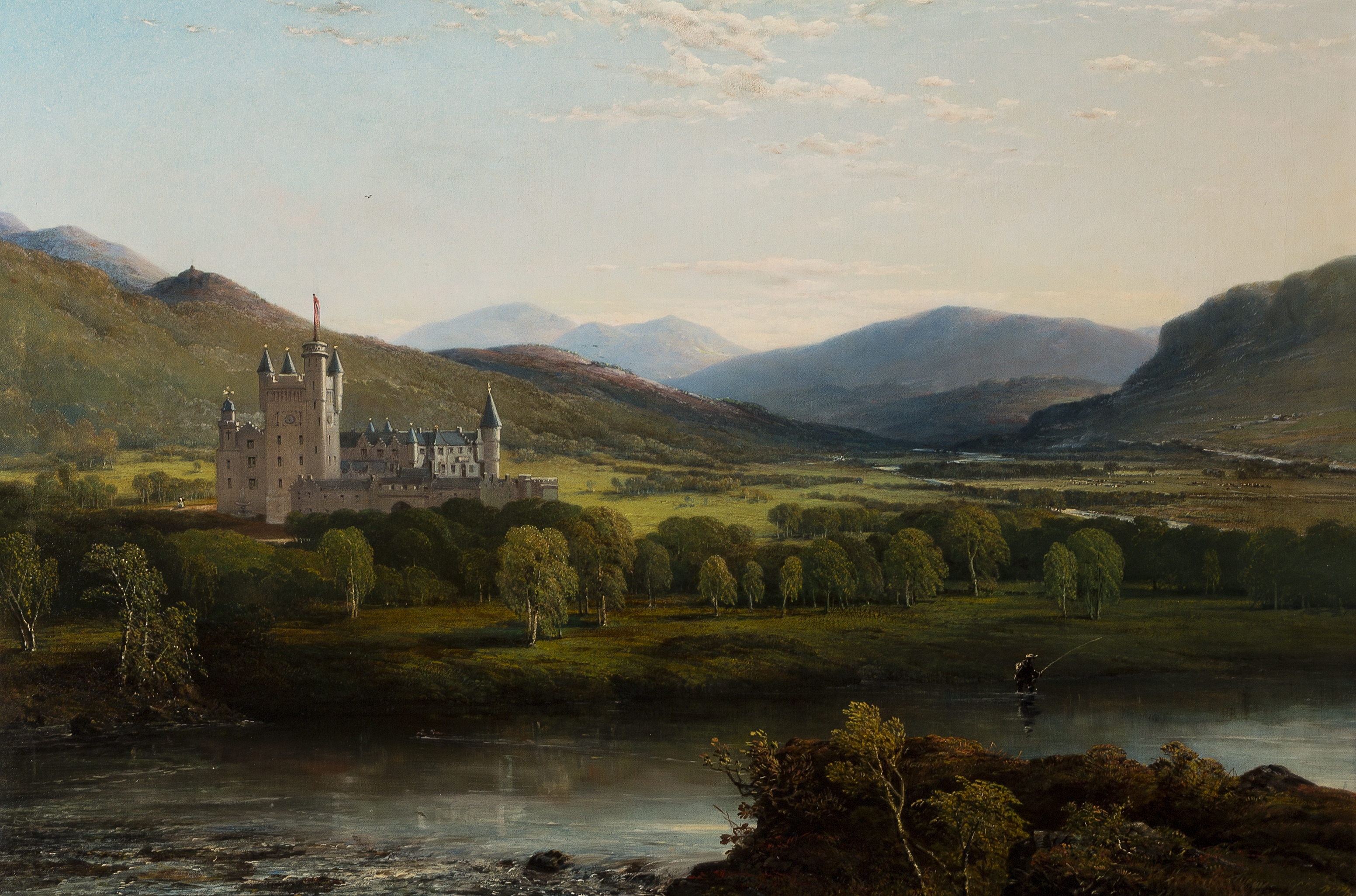
Balmoral Castle, painted by James Cassie

The new house was completed in 1856, and the old castle was later demolished. By autumn 1857, a new bridge across the Dee, designed by Isambard Kingdom Brunel linking Crathie and Balmoral was finished.

Balmoral Castle is built from granite quarried at Invergelder on the estate. It consists of two main blocks, each arranged around a courtyard. The southwestern block contains the main rooms, while the northeastern contains the service wings. At the southeast is an 80-foot-tall (24-metre) clock tower topped with turrets, one of which has a balustrade similar to a feature at Castle Fraser. Being similar in style to the demolished castle of the 1830s, the architecture of the new house is considered to be somewhat dated for its time when contrasted with the richer forms of Scots baronial being developed by William Burn and others during the 1850s. As an exercise in Scots baronial, it is sometimes described as too ordered, pedantic, and even Germanic as a consequence of Prince Albert's influence on the design.

However, the purchase of a Scottish estate by Victoria and Albert and their adoption of a Scottish architectural style were influential for the ongoing revival of Highland culture. They decorated Balmoral with tartans and attended highland games at Braemar. Queen Victoria expressed an affinity for Scotland, even professing herself to be a Jacobite. Added to the work of Sir Walter Scott, this became a major factor in promoting the adoption of Highland culture by Lowland Scots. Historian Michael Lynch comments that "the Scottishness of Balmoral helped to give the monarchy a truly British dimension for the first time".

=== Victoria and Albert at Balmoral ===
Even before the completion of the new house, the pattern of the life of the royal couple in the Highlands was soon established. Victoria took long walks of up to four hours daily, and Albert spent many days hunting deer and game. In 1849, diarist Charles Greville described their life at Balmoral as resembling that of the gentry rather than royalty. Victoria began a policy of commissioning artists to record Balmoral, its surroundings, and its staff. Over the years, numerous painters were employed at Balmoral, including Edwin and Charles Landseer, and Carl Haag.

During the 1850s, new plantations were established near the house and exotic conifers were planted on the grounds. Prince Albert had an active role in these improvements, overseeing the design of parterres, the diversion of the main road north of the river via a new bridge, and plans for farm buildings. These buildings included a model dairy that he developed in 1861, the year of his death. Victoria completed the dairy. Subsequently, she also built several monuments to her husband on the estate. These include a pyramid-shaped cairn built on top of Craig Lurachain a year after Albert's death. A large statue of Albert with a dog and a gun by William Theed, was inaugurated on 15 October 1867, the twenty-eighth anniversary of their engagement.

Following Albert's death, Victoria spent increasingly longer periods at Balmoral, staying for as long as four months a year during the early summer and autumn. She placed numerous mementoes of Albert on display.

Few further changes were made to the grounds, except for some alterations to mountain paths, the erection of various cairns and monuments, and the addition of some cottages (Karim Cottage and Baile na Coille) built for senior staff. It was during this period that Victoria began to depend on her servant, John Brown. He was a local ghillie from Crathie, who became one of her closest companions during her long mourning.

In 1887, Balmoral Castle was the birthplace of Victoria Eugenie, a granddaughter of Queen Victoria. She was born to Princess Beatrice, the fifth daughter of Victoria and Albert. Victoria Eugenie became queen of Spain when she married King Alfonso XIII in 1906.

In September 1896, Victoria welcomed Emperor Nicholas II of Russia and Empress Alexandra, a granddaughter of Victoria, to Balmoral. Four years later, Victoria made her last visit to the estate, three months before her death on 22 January 1901.

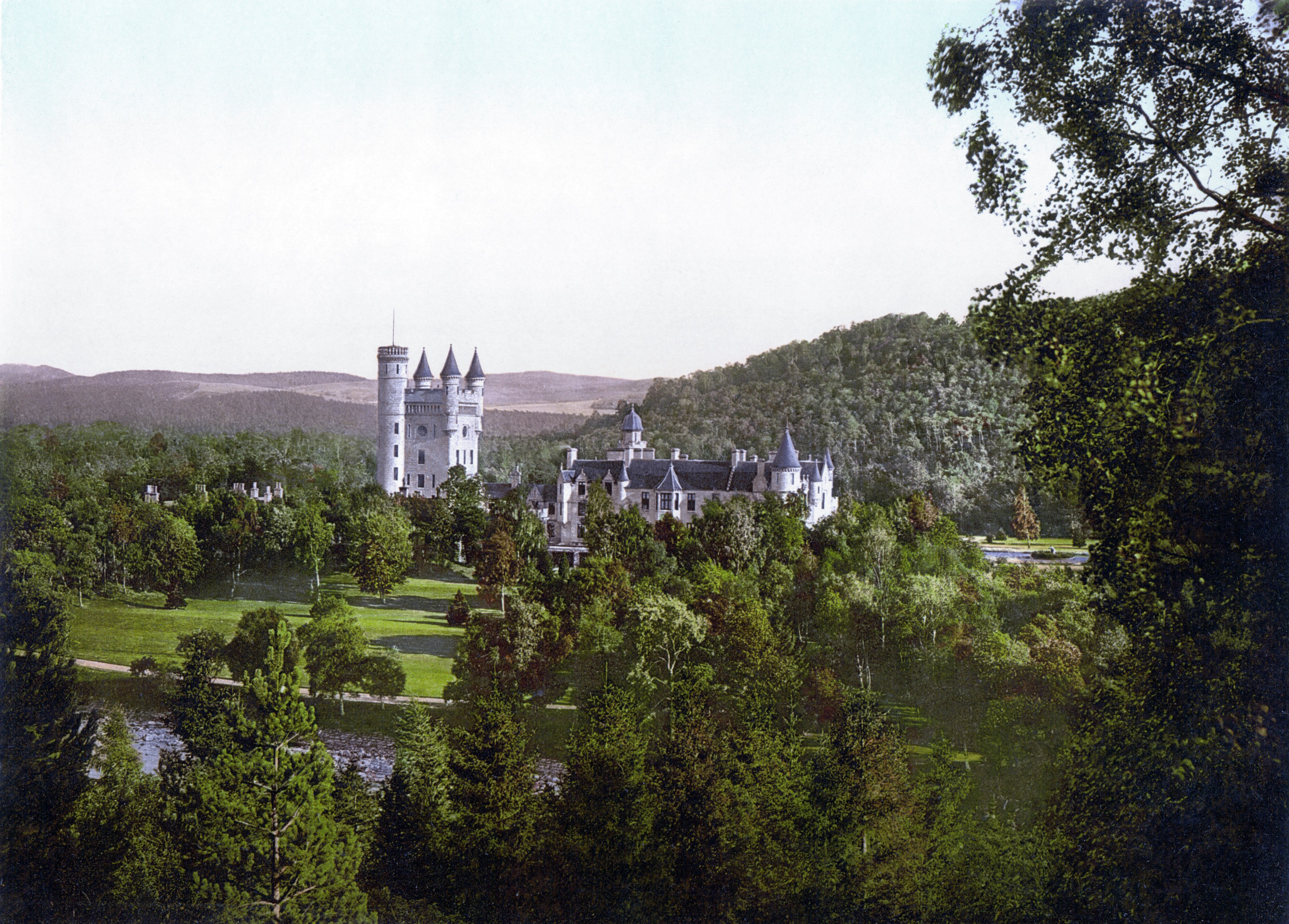
Balmoral (c. 1890–1900)

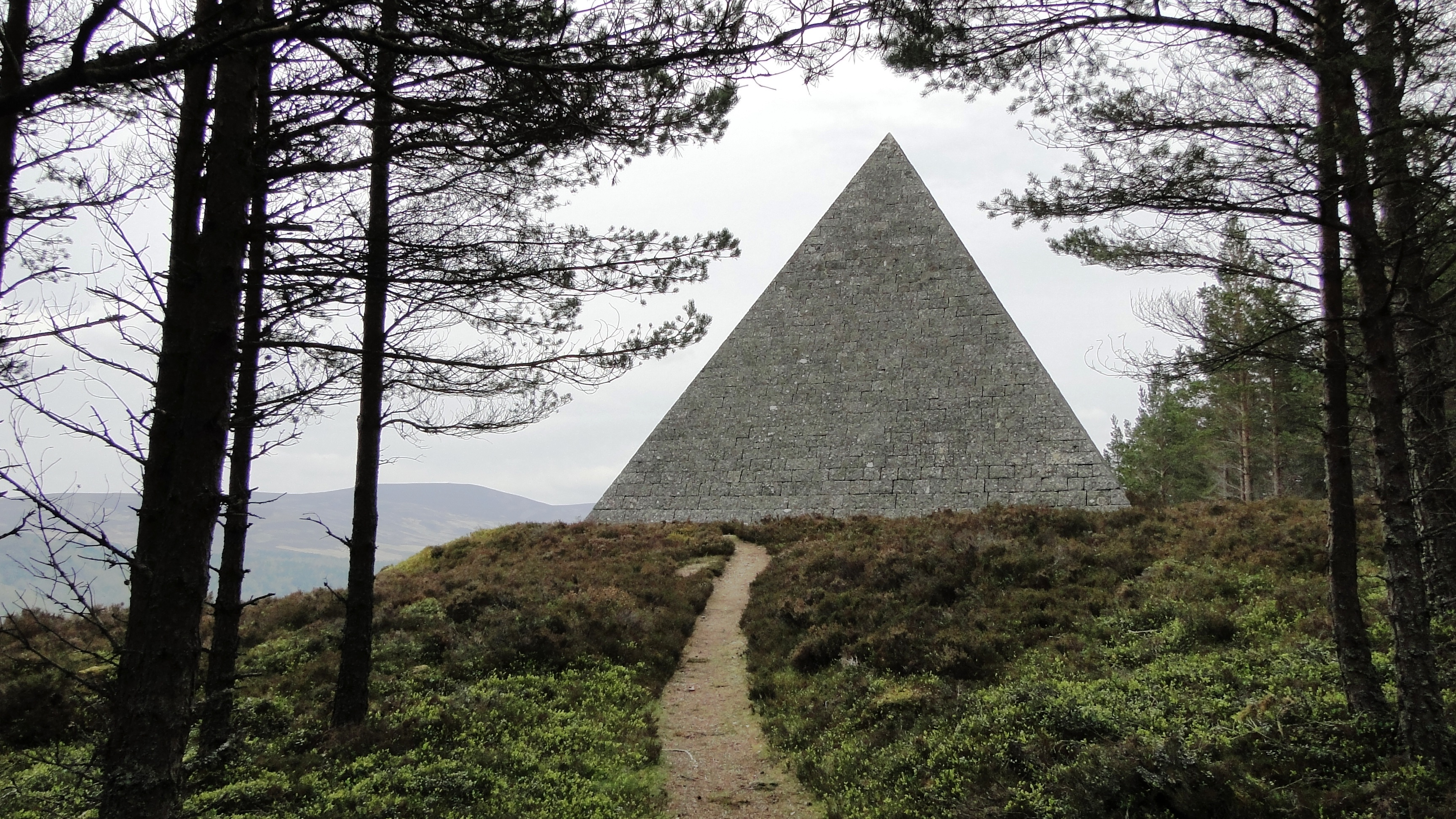
Memorial cairn for Prince Albert, Balmoral Estate

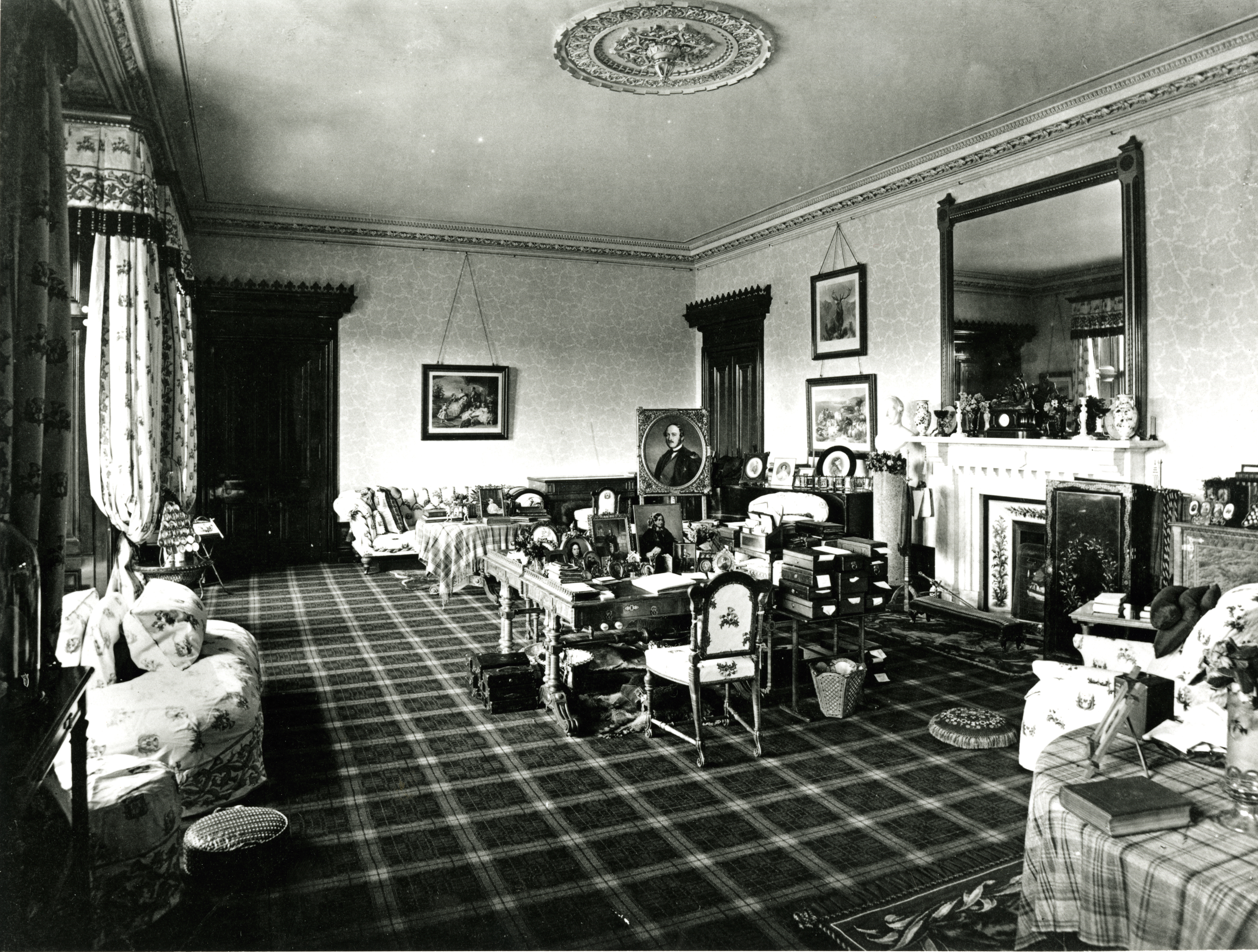
Queen Victoria's Business Room at Balmoral

=== After Victoria ===
After Victoria's death, the royal family continued to use Balmoral during annual autumn visits. George V had substantial improvements made during the 1910s and 1920s, including formal gardens to the south of the castle.

During the Second World War, royal visits to Balmoral ceased. In addition, due to the conflict with Germany, Danzig Shiel, a lodge built by Victoria in Ballochbuie, was renamed Garbh Allt Shiel and the "King of Prussia's Fountain" was removed from the grounds.

In the 1950s, Prince Philip added herbaceous borders and a water garden. During the 1980s, new staff buildings were built close to the castle.

=== Death of Queen Elizabeth II ===
Queen Elizabeth II had been at the castle since July 2022 for her annual summer holiday and had been receiving medical care there. In a break with tradition, Balmoral Castle, rather than Buckingham Palace, was the location of the appointment of British Prime Minister Liz Truss on 6 September 2022, due to concerns regarding the Queen's mobility issues. Elizabeth died at Balmoral two days later at the age of 96. She was the first monarch to die at Balmoral, and this was the first time a monarch had died in Scotland since James V died in 1542 at Falkland Palace. The Queen's coffin lay in repose in the ballroom of the castle for three days, to allow the Royal Family, estate staff and neighbours to pay their respects. On 11 September, the coffin was transported to the Palace of Holyroodhouse in Edinburgh for the start of the state funeral proceedings.

=== Links to Jeffrey Epstein ===
In October 2026, BBC News reported that Police Scotland were making inquires into the activities of Andrew Mountbatten-Windsor, the former Duke of York, Jeffrey Epstein and Ghislaine Maxwell during their repeated visits to Balmoral Castle. Scottish authorities stated that the inquiries related to claims that women were trafficked to the estate. The news followed the release of images by the United States Department of Justice that appeared to show Epstein and Maxwell on a hunting trip at Balmoral in 1999.

== Architecture ==
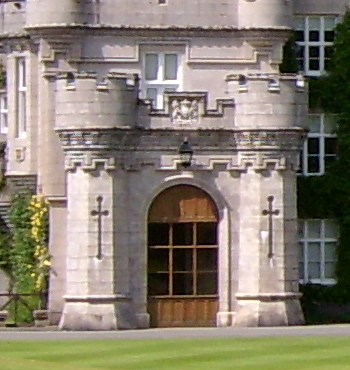
The "battlemented" porte cochère. Also called a "carriage porch", this structure is covered to protect people arriving and departing from inclement weather.

Though called a castle, Balmoral's primary function is that of a country house. It is a "typical and rather ordinary" country house from the Victorian period. The tower and "pepper pot turrets" are characteristic features of the residence's Scottish baronial style. The seven-storey tower is an architectural feature borrowed from medieval defensive tower houses. The "pepper pot" turrets were influenced by the style of 16th-century French châteaux. Other features of the Scottish baronial style are the crow-stepped gables, dormer windows, and battlemented porte-cochère.

== Ownership ==
Balmoral is private property and, unlike the monarch's official residences, is not the property of the Crown. It was originally bought privately by Prince Albert for Queen Victoria. As a result no revenues from the estate goes to Parliament or the public purse, as would be the case for property owned by the Crown under the Civil List Act 1760. Along with Sandringham House in Norfolk, ownership of Balmoral was inherited by Edward VIII on his accession in 1936. After he abdicated later that year he kept ownership of both, and a financial settlement was arranged under which his brother and successor, George VI, bought them from him.

Elizabeth II inherited the Balmoral estate from her father. After her death, ownership passed to her eldest son King Charles III, but the estate is managed by trustees under Deeds of Nomination and Appointment.

== Estate ==
=== Extent and operation ===
Balmoral Estate is within the Cairngorms National Park and is partly within the Deeside and Lochnagar National Scenic Area. The 50,000-acre (20,000-hectare) estate contains a wide variety of landscapes, from the Dee river valley to open mountains. There are seven Munros (hills in Scotland over 3,000 ft or 914.4 m) within the estate, the highest being Lochnagar at 3,789 ft (1,155 m). This mountain was the setting for a children's story, The Old Man of Lochnagar, told originally by Charles III to his younger brothers, Andrew and Edward. The story was published in 1980, with royalties accruing to the Prince's Trust (now the King's Trust). The estate also incorporates the 7,500-acre (3,000-hectare) Delnadamph Lodge estate, bought by Elizabeth II in 1978.

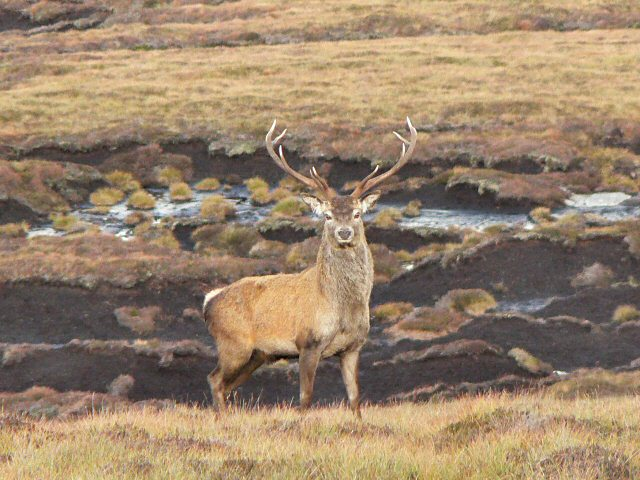
Red deer stag near Glas-allt-Shiel lodge on the Balmoral estate

The estate extends to Loch Muick in the southeast, where an old boat house and the Royal Bothy (hunting lodge), now named Glas-allt-Shiel, built by Victoria, are located.

The working estate includes grouse moors, forestry, and farmland, as well as managed herds of deer, Highland cattle, and ponies. It also offers access to the public for fishing (paid) and hiking during certain seasons.

Approximately 8,000 acres (3,200 hectares) of the estate are covered by trees, with almost 3,000 acres (1,200 hectares) used for forestry that yields nearly 10,000 tonnes of wood per year. Ballochbuie Forest, one of the largest remaining areas of old Caledonian pine growth in Scotland, consists of approximately 3,000 acres (1,200 hectares). It is managed with only minimal or no intervention. The principal mammal on the estate is the red deer with a population of 2,000 to 2,500 head.

The areas of Lochnagar and Ballochbuie were designated in 1998 by the Secretary of State for Scotland as Special Protection Areas (SPA) under the European Union (EU) Birds Directive. Bird species inhabiting the moorlands include red grouse, black grouse, ptarmigan, and the capercaillie. Ballochbuie is also protected as a Special Area of Conservation by the EU Habitats Directive, as "one of the largest remaining continuous areas of native Caledonian Forest". In addition, there are four sites of special scientific interest on the estate.

The royal family employs approximately 50 full-time and 50–100 part-time staff to maintain the working estate.

There are approximately 150 buildings on the estate, including Birkhall, formerly home to Queen Elizabeth the Queen Mother, where King Charles III and Queen Camilla spent their honeymoon in 2005. Craigowan Lodge is regularly used by the family and friends of the royal family and has also been used while Balmoral Castle was being prepared for a royal visit. Six smaller buildings on the estate are let as holiday cottages. The hunting lodge of Inchnabobart has also been used by the royal family.

=== Public access to gardens and castle grounds ===
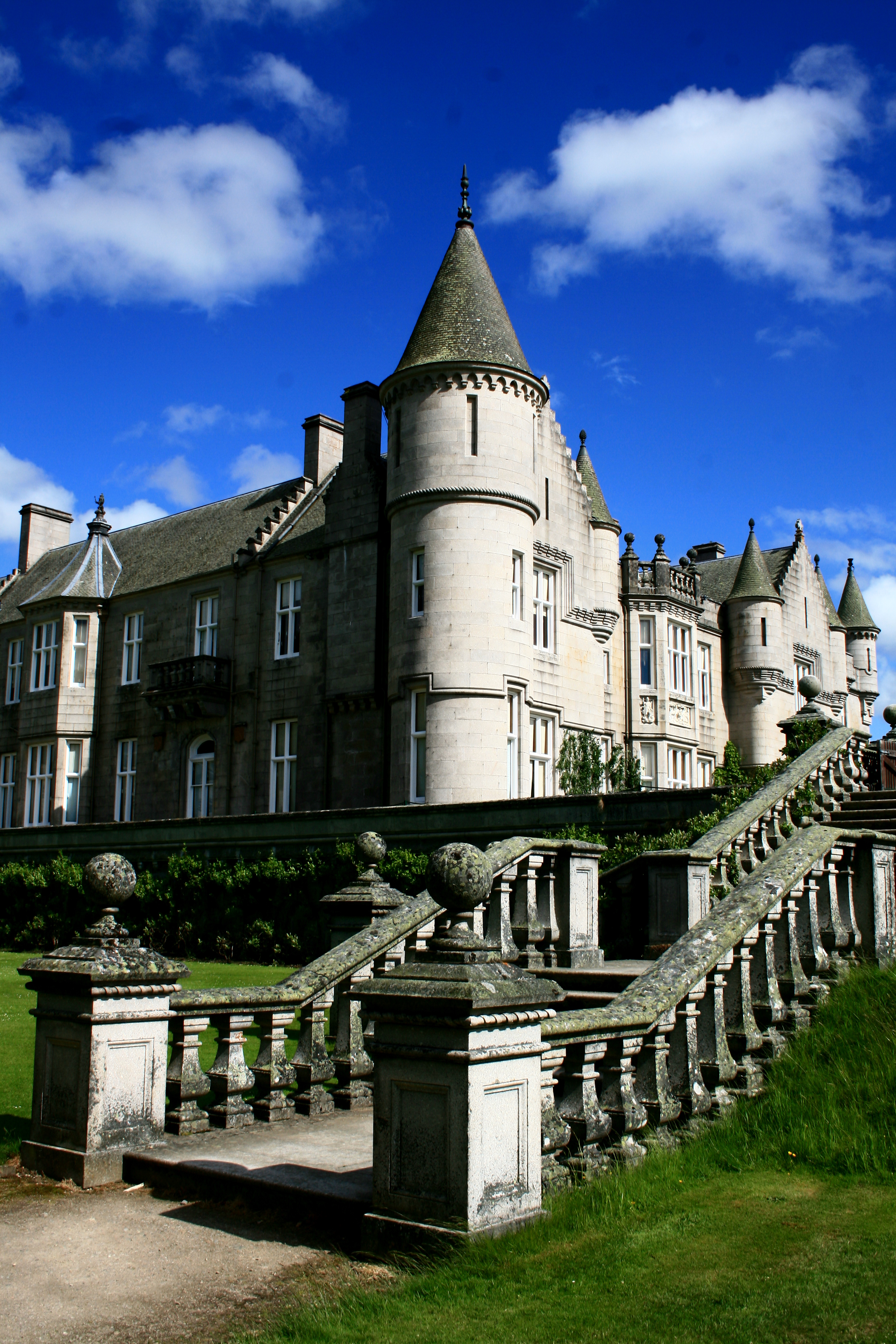
Northwest corner of Balmoral Castle

In 1931, the gardens and castle grounds were opened to the public for the first time. They are now open daily between April and the end of July, after which royal family members arrive at the castle for their annual stay. The ballroom was the only room in the castle that could be viewed by the public until 2024.

In 2024, limited numbers of the public were able to view the interior and several rooms used by members of the royal family during a month-long summer tour programme. This was the first time since the castle was completed in 1855 that it was open to the public. In addition, the gift shop, restaurant and café were redesigned and renovated, prioritising local Scottish craftsmanship and premium textiles.

=== Craigowan Lodge ===
Craigowan Lodge is a seven-bedroom stone house approximately 1 mile (1.6 km) from the main castle in Balmoral. More rustic than the castle, the lodge was often used by Prince Charles and Diana, Princess of Wales when they visited. In May 1981, Charles and Diana posed for a photo at the lodge before their July 1981 wedding.

In the obituary of Prince Michael Andreevich of Russia in 2008, it was noted that his family spent most of World War II at Craigowan Lodge.

The lodge has been in the news periodically since 2005 because Elizabeth II and Prince Philip often spent the first few days of their summer holiday there. During the summer, the castle is a lucrative source of income from tourists. Sometimes, the Queen arrived at Balmoral before the tourist season was over.

=== Tam-Na-Ghar ===
Tam-Na-Ghar is a three-bedroom cottage on the Balmoral estate. The property was passed down from Queen Elizabeth the Queen Mother to Prince William. Built in the traditional style of Scottish lodges, it has been used by William and his wife Catherine since before their marriage and in the years after alongside their children as a retreat when they visit Scotland. It is close to Birkhall, the residence of King Charles III and Queen Camilla.

== In popular culture ==
Parts of the films Mrs Brown (1997) and The Queen (2006) were based on events at Balmoral. In both films, substitute locations were used: Blairquhan Castle in The Queen and Duns Castle in Mrs Brown. In the Netflix series The Crown, Ardverikie House was used as a stand-in. In the sci-fi film The Day After Tomorrow (2004), three helicopters of the Royal Air Force crash in Scotland during an attempt to evacuate the Royal Family from Balmoral Castle.

An illustration of the castle features on the reverse of £100 notes issued by the Royal Bank of Scotland.

== See also ==
- Ardverikie House, often used as a stand-in for Balmoral Castle in film
- Crathie Kirk
- List of British royal residences
- Castles in Scotland
- Alatskivi Castle, an Estonian castle influenced by the Balmoral Castle style
- Balmoral chicken
