= Loch Muick =

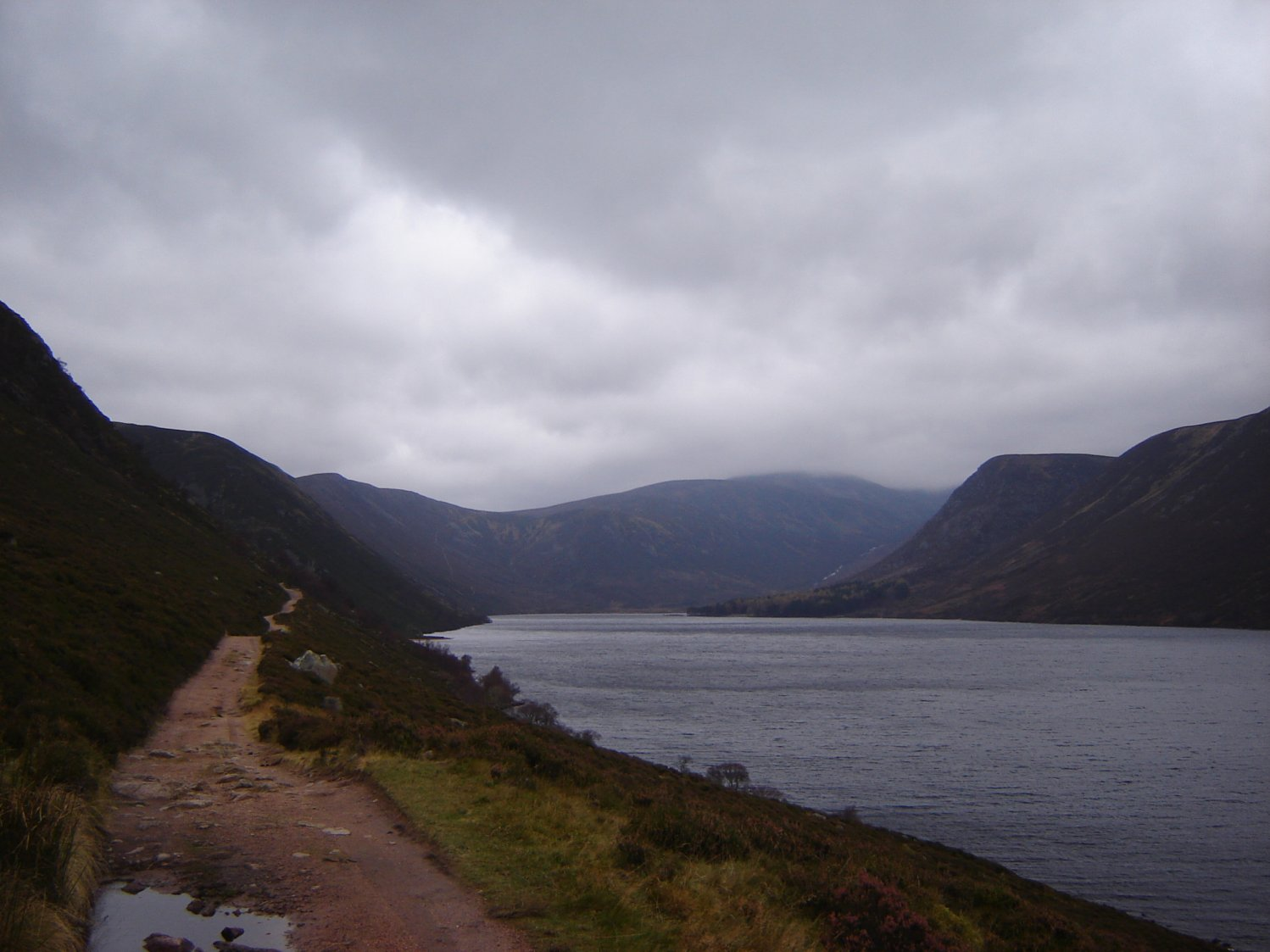
- Lock Muick from the eastern shore, looking west

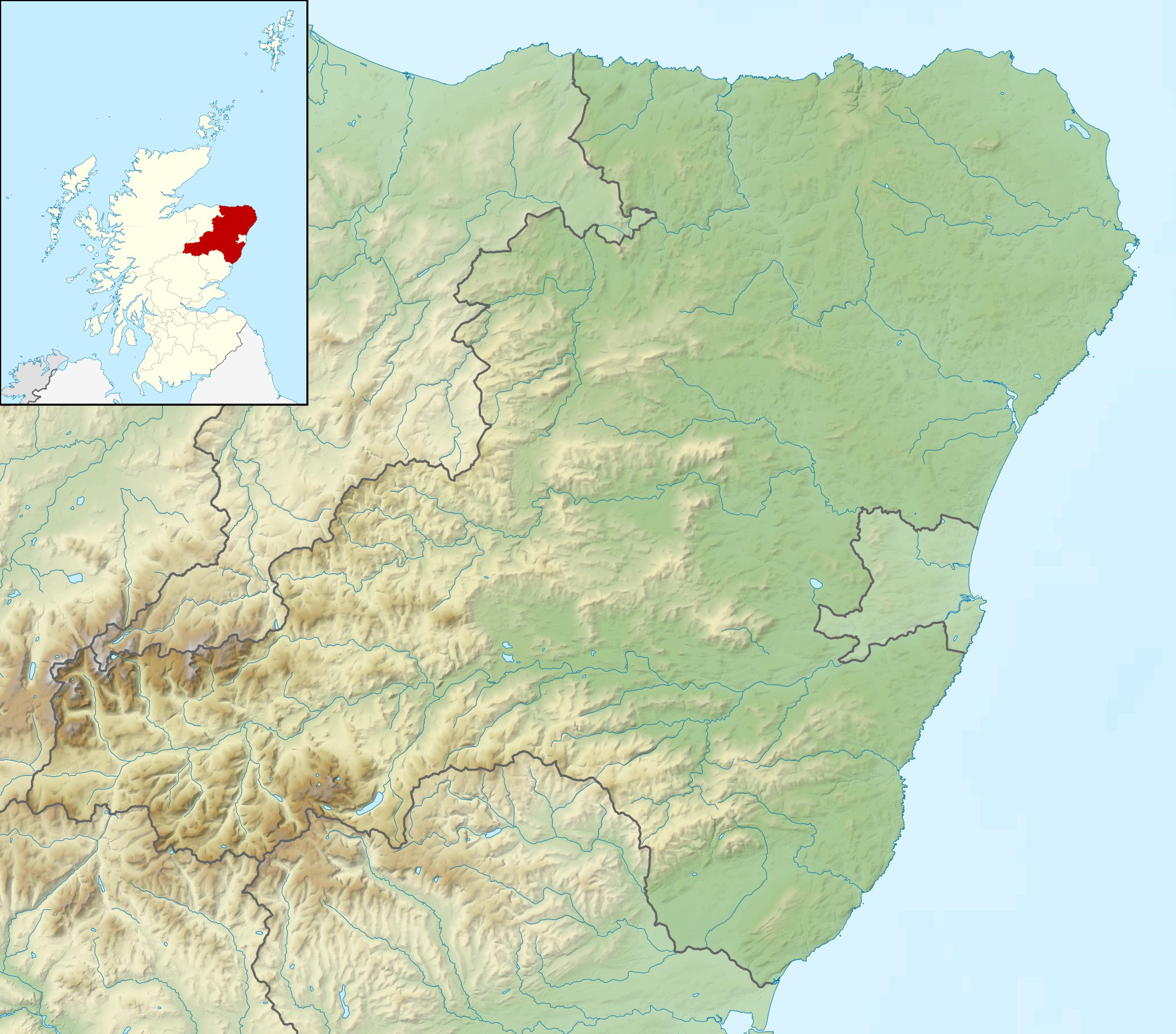
- Location within Aberdeenshire
- Location: Aberdeenshire, Scotland
- Coordinates: 56°55′59″N 3°10′13″W
- Type: freshwater loch
- Primary inflows: Allt an Dubh Loch
- Primary outflows: River Muick
- Basin countries: Scotland
- Max. length: 2.25 mi (3.62 km)
- Max. width: 0.33 mi (0.53 km)
- Surface area: 218.5 ha (540 acres)
- Average depth: 116 ft (35 m)
- Max. depth: 256 ft (78 m)
- Water volume: 2,771,000,000 ft^{3} (78,500,000 m^{3})
- Shore length^{1}: 8.5 km (5.3 mi)
- Surface elevation: 398 m (1,306 ft)
- Islands: 1
- ^{1} Shore length is not a well-defined measure.

Loch Muick (/ˈmɪk/) is an upland, freshwater loch lying approximately five miles (eight kilometres) south of Braemar, Scotland at the head of Glen Muick and within the boundary of the Balmoral estate.

== Geography ==
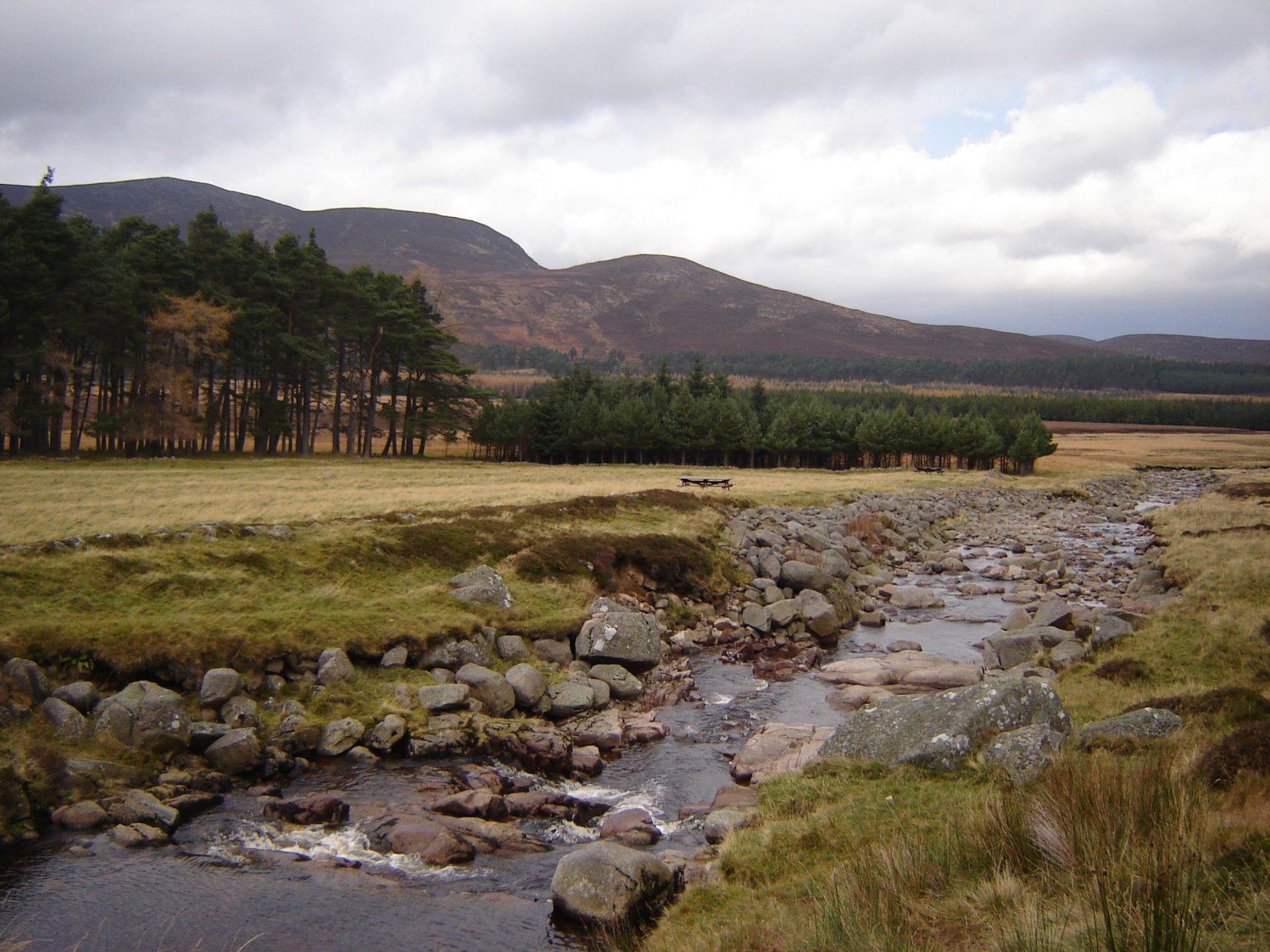
Allt Darrarie, flowing down to the River Muick just below Loch Muick

Loch Muick trends in a southwest and northeast direction and is approximately 2 1/4 mi (3.5 km) in length. It is surrounded on both sides by steep hills. The loch is fed by many small streams, the largest being Allt an dubh Loch in the west which flows down from Dubh Loch. The outflow is the source of the River Muick. The name of loch, glen and river is pronounced "mick".

The loch was surveyed on 8 July 1905 by T.N. Johnston and L.W. Collet and later charted as part of the Sir John Murray's Bathymetrical Survey of Fresh-Water Lochs of Scotland 1897-1909.

== Flora and fauna ==
A wide variety of bird and animal life can be found in and around the loch including red squirrel, red deer, Eurasian oystercatchers, salmon and trout. Birch trees can be found around the edge of the loch.

== Glas-allt Shiel ==
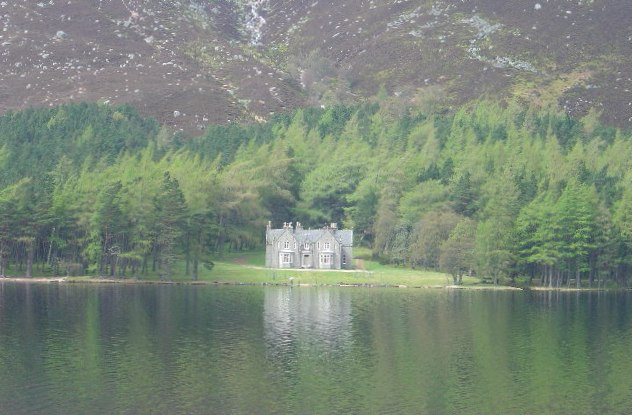
Glas Allt Shiel

Glas-allt Shiel, the hunting lodge originally built for Queen Victoria and completed in 1868, lies at the western end of the north shore of the loch. The queen had previously used the lodge further north in the glen at Allt-na-giubhsaich but after the death of Prince Albert could no longer bear to stay there, with its associations. The cottage at Glas-allt Shiel was extended and became her new retreat. It is also known as the Widow's House or the Widow's Hut.

== Recreation ==
The loch is popular with walkers as it is picturesque, has a fairly flat path around its perimeter and is accessible by road. The bothy behind Glas-allt Shiel is now maintained by Dundee University Rucksack Club.

Fishing on the loch is restricted and not available to the public. The Ballater Angling Association has permission from the Balmoral Estate to fish and it maintains a boathouse and slip at the north end of the loch. Queen Victoria went on numerous fishing excursions on the loch.
