= Adam Smith House =

Buildings in Scotland

Several buildings in Scotland are referred to as the Adam Smith House, being named after the Scottish economist Adam Smith.

== Kirkcaldy ==
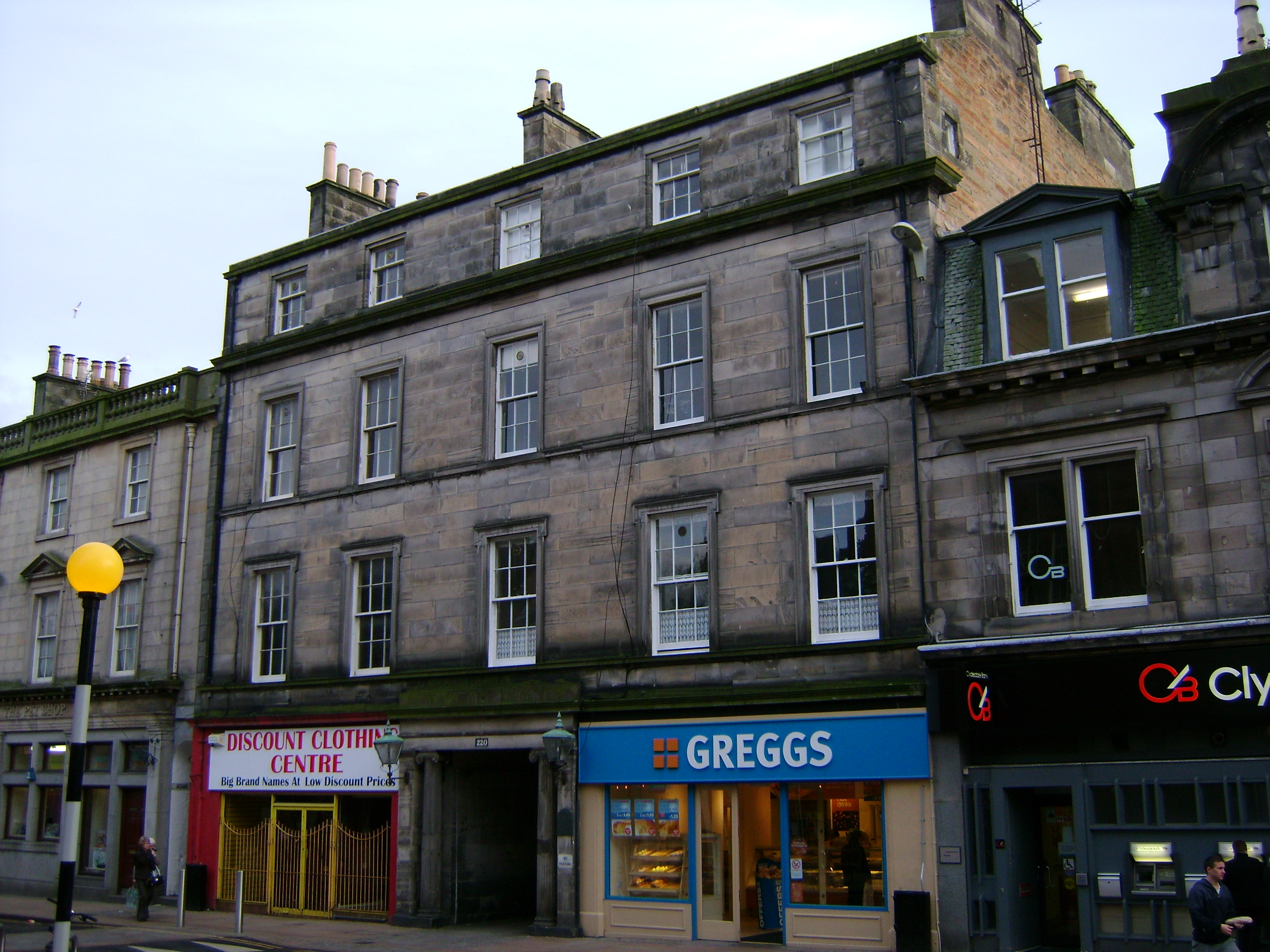
A 19th-century building in Kirkcaldy, near the location of the house of Adam Smith's mother, where Smith lived from 1767 to 1776, and wrote The Wealth of Nations

Adam Smith lived with his mother, in her house, in Kirkcaldy, Scotland, from 1767 to 1776. That house, on the High Street, is where he wrote The Wealth of Nations. The house was torn down in 1834. The successor building, at Nos 218–222 High Street, pictured, was built in 1834 and is itself a historic building, holding Category B Listed building status.

== Edinburgh ==
Panmure House (unrelated to the country house of the same name) was Smith's home in Edinburgh, Scotland from 1788 to 1790. In 2008, the house was purchased by the Edinburgh Business School. Work began on its restoration into a centre for economic and social debate and the latest academic thinking in July 2016. The building was reopened following restoration in November 2018 by former British Prime Minister Gordon Brown.

== Aberdeen ==
While it was only built in the 1960s, "Adam Smith House" is also the name of a purpose-built student accommodation building in the Hillhead Student Village, operated by the University of Aberdeen.
