= Adam Smith =

Scottish economist and philosopher (1723–1790)

Adam Smith FRS FRSE FRSA
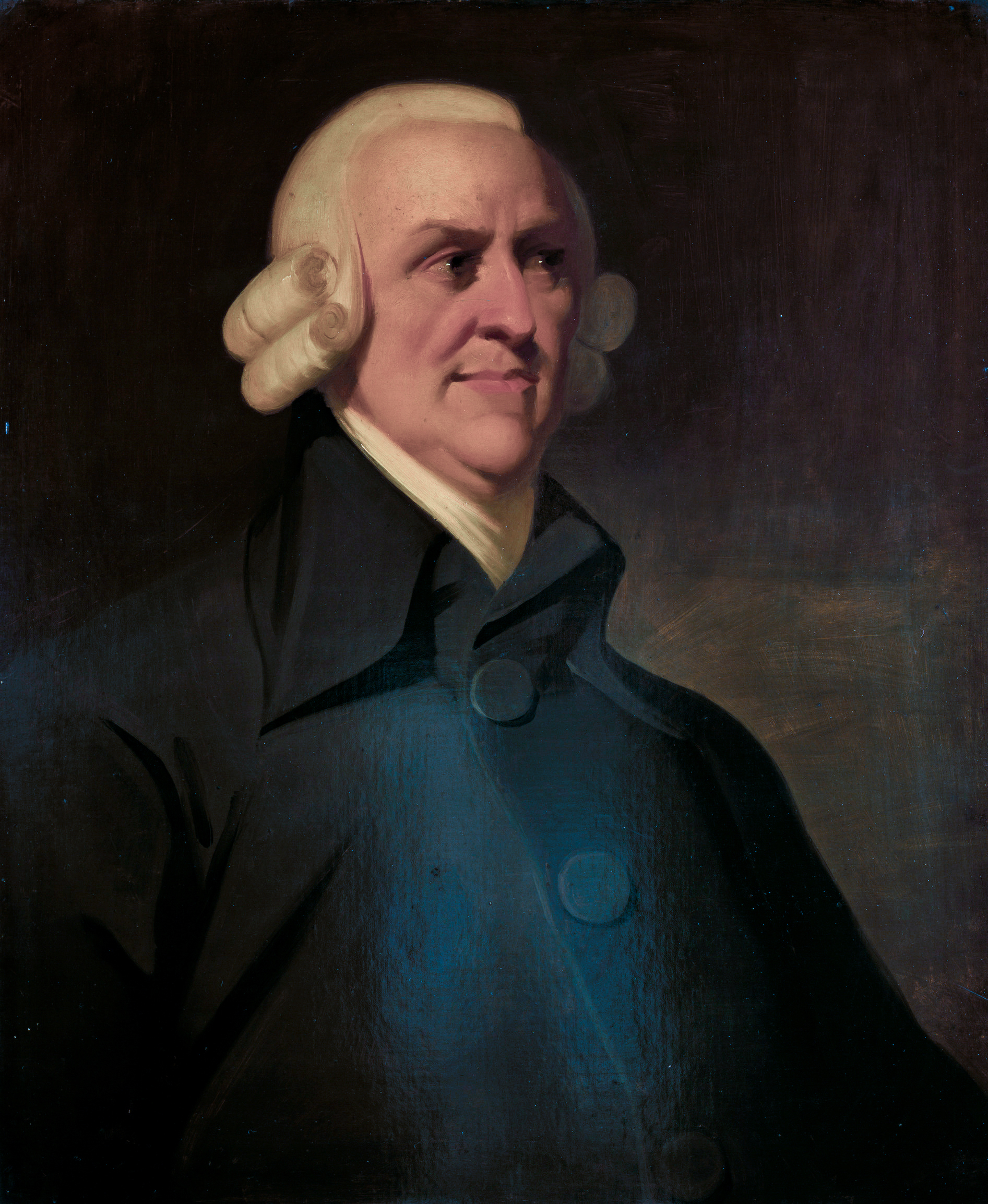
- Posthumous Muir portrait, c. 1800
- Born: Kirkcaldy, Fife, Scotland
- Baptised: 16 June [O.S. 5 June] 1723
- Died: 17 July 1790 (aged 67); Edinburgh, Scotland
- Resting place: Canongate Kirkyard

Education
- Education: University of Glasgow; Balliol College, Oxford

Philosophical work
- Era: Early modern period
- Region: Western philosophy
- Main interests: Political philosophy, ethics, economics
- Notable works: The Theory of Moral Sentiments (1759); The Wealth of Nations (1776)
- Notable ideas: Classical economics; Free market; Division of labour; Absolute advantage; Invisible hand

Adam Smith (baptised 16 June [O.S. 5 June] 1723 – 17 July 1790) was a Scottish (Note: Smith was described as a North Briton and Scot.) economist and philosopher who was a pioneer in the field of political economy and key figure during the Scottish Enlightenment. Seen by many as the "father of economics", or the "father of capitalism", he is primarily known for two classic works: The Theory of Moral Sentiments (1759) and An Inquiry into the Nature and Causes of the Wealth of Nations (1776). The latter, often abbreviated as The Wealth of Nations, is regarded as his magnum opus, marking the inception of modern economic scholarship as a comprehensive system and an academic discipline. Smith refuses to explain the distribution of wealth and power in terms of divine will and instead appeals to natural, political, social, economic, legal, environmental and technological factors, as well as the interactions among them. The work is notable for its contribution to economic theory, particularly in its exposition of the concept of absolute advantage.

Born in Kirkcaldy, Fife, he studied social philosophy at the University of Glasgow and at the University of Oxford, where he was one of the only students to benefit from scholarships set up by John Snell. Following his graduation, he delivered a successful series of public lectures at the University of Edinburgh, that met with acclaim. This led to a collaboration with David Hume during the Scottish Enlightenment. Smith obtained a professorship at Glasgow, where he taught moral philosophy. During this period, he wrote and published The Theory of Moral Sentiments. Subsequently, he assumed a tutoring position that facilitated travel throughout Europe, where he encountered intellectual figures of his era.

In response to the prevailing policy of safeguarding national markets and merchants through the reduction of imports and the augmentation of exports, a practice that came to be known as mercantilism, Smith laid the foundational principles of classical free-market economic theory. The Wealth of Nations was a precursor to the modern academic discipline of economics. In this and other works, he developed the concept of division of labour and expounded upon how rational self-interest and competition can lead to economic prosperity. Smith was controversial in his day and his general approach and writing style were often satirised by writers such as Horace Walpole.

== Biography ==
=== Early life ===
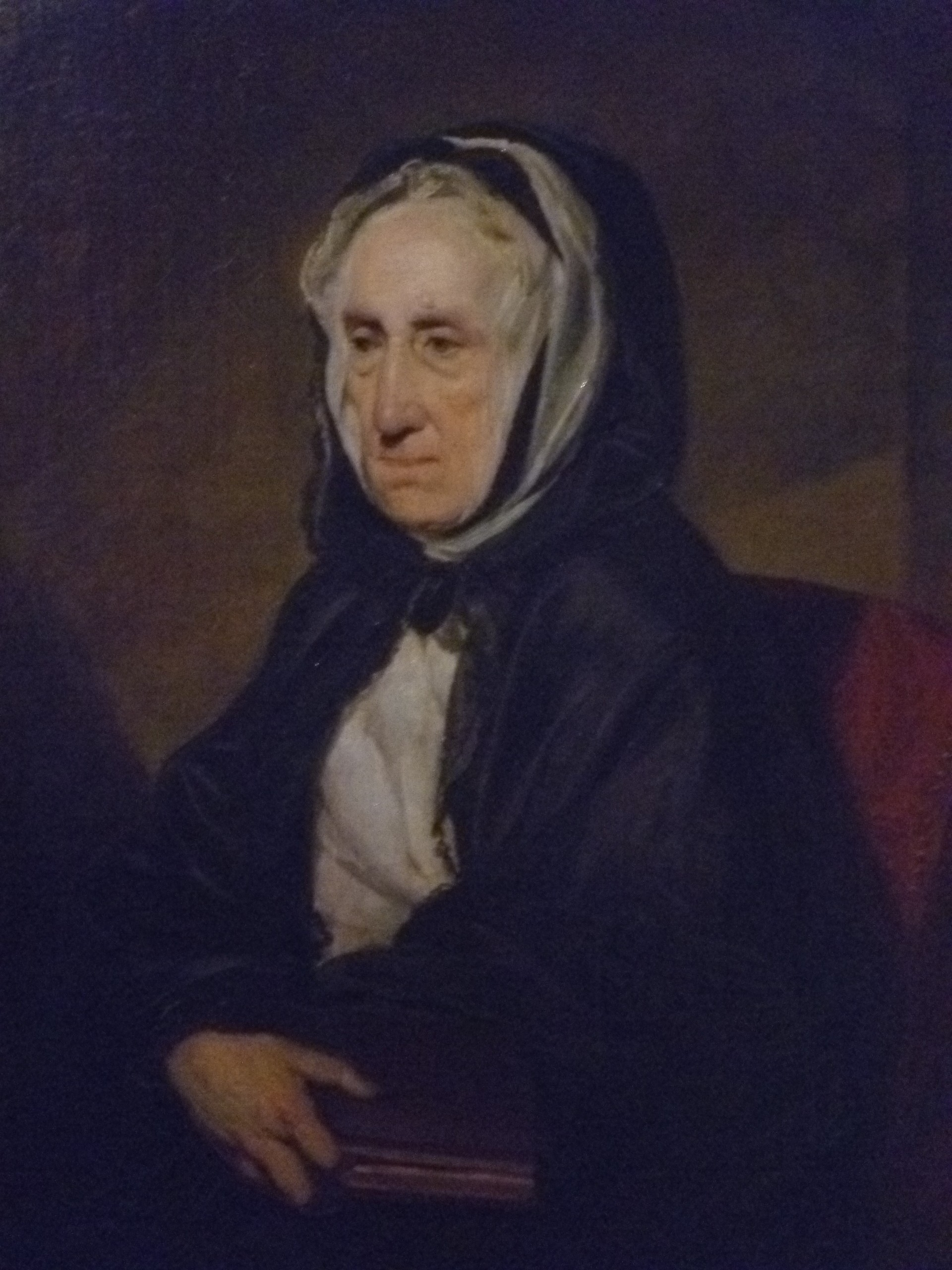
Portrait of Smith's mother, Margaret Douglas

Adam Smith was born in Kirkcaldy, in Fife, Scotland. His father, Adam Smith senior, was a Scottish Writer to the Signet (senior solicitor), advocate and prosecutor (judge advocate) and also served as comptroller of the customs in Kirkcaldy. Smith's mother was born Margaret Douglas, daughter of the landed Robert Douglas of Strathendry, also in Fife; she married Smith's father in 1720. Two months before Smith was born, his father died, leaving his mother a widow. The date of Smith's baptism into the Church of Scotland at Kirkcaldy was 5 June 1723 and this has often been treated as if it were also his date of birth, which is unknown.

Although few events in Smith's early childhood are known, the Scottish journalist John Rae, a biographer of Smith, recorded that Smith was abducted by Romani at the age of three and released when others went to rescue him. (Note: In Life of Adam Smith, Rae writes: "In his fourth year, while on a visit to his grandfather's house at Strathendry on the banks of the Leven, [Smith] was stolen by a passing band of gypsies, and for a time could not be found. But presently a gentleman arrived who had met a Romani woman a few miles down the road carrying a child that was crying piteously. Scouts were immediately dispatched in the direction indicated, and they came upon the woman in Leslie wood. As soon as she saw them she threw her burden down and escaped, and the child was brought back to his mother. [Smith] would have made, I fear, a poor gypsy.") Smith was close to his mother, who probably encouraged him to pursue his scholarly ambitions. He attended the Burgh School of Kirkcaldy—characterised by Rae as "one of the best secondary schools of Scotland at that period"—from 1729 to 1737, learning Latin, mathematics, history and writing."

=== Formal education ===
Smith entered the University of Glasgow at age 14 and studied moral philosophy under Francis Hutcheson. Here he developed his passion for the philosophical concepts of reason, civilian liberties and the freedom of speech. In 1740 he was the graduate scholar presented to undertake postgraduate studies at the Balliol College of the University of Oxford, under the Snell Exhibition.

Smith considered the teaching at Glasgow to be far superior to that at Oxford, which he found intellectually stifling. In Book V, Chapter II of The Wealth of Nations, he wrote: "In the University of Oxford, the greater part of the public professors have, for these many years, given up altogether even the pretence of teaching." Smith is also reported to have complained to friends that Oxford officials once discovered him reading a copy of David Hume's A Treatise of Human Nature, and they subsequently confiscated his book and punished him severely for reading it. According to William Robert Scott, "The Oxford of [Smith's] time gave little if any help towards what was to be his lifework." Nevertheless, he took the opportunity while at Oxford to teach himself several subjects by reading many books from the shelves of the large Bodleian Library. When Smith was not studying on his own, his time at Oxford was not a happy one, according to his letters. Near the end of his time there, he began suffering from shaking fits, probably the symptoms of a nervous breakdown. He left Oxford in 1746, before his scholarship ended.

Smith's curriculum at Glasgow included logic, metaphysics, moral philosophy, and natural philosophy. Under Hutcheson, Smith debated questions of natural justice, fair exchange, and the moral dimensions of commerce; themes which would be reflected in The Wealth of Nations. Hutcheson argued that workers deserved compensation sufficient to sustain themselves and their families, a concept Smith would later develop into his broader theory of natural wage levels.

In Book V of The Wealth of Nations, Smith comments on the low quality of instruction and the meagre intellectual activity at English universities, when compared to their Scottish counterparts. He attributes this both to the rich endowments of the colleges at Oxford and the University of Cambridge, which made the income of professors independent of their ability to attract students, and to the fact that distinguished men of letters could make an even more comfortable living as ministers of the Church of England.

=== Teaching career ===
Smith began delivering public lectures in 1748 at the University of Edinburgh, sponsored by the Philosophical Society of Edinburgh under the patronage of Lord Kames. His lecture topics included rhetoric and belles-lettres, and later the subject of "the progress of opulence". On this latter topic, he first expounded his economic philosophy of "the obvious and simple system of natural liberty". While Smith was not adept at public speaking, his lectures met with success.

In 1750 Smith met the philosopher David Hume, who was his senior by more than a decade. In their writings covering history, politics, philosophy, economics, and religion, Smith and Hume shared closer intellectual and personal bonds than with other important figures of the Scottish Enlightenment.

In 1751 Smith earned a professorship at Glasgow teaching logic courses, and in 1752, he was elected a member of the Philosophical Society of Edinburgh, having been introduced to the society by Henry Home, Lord Kames. The following year, when the position of head of Moral Philosophy in Glasgow became vacant, Smith took over the role. He worked as an academic for the next 13 years, which he characterised as "by far the most useful and therefore by far the happiest and most honorable period [of his life]".

Smith published The Theory of Moral Sentiments in 1759, embodying some of his Glasgow lectures. This work was concerned with how human morality depends on sympathy between agent and spectator, or the individual and other members of society. Smith defined "mutual sympathy" as the basis of moral sentiments. He based his explanation, not on a special "moral sense" as Anthony Ashley-Cooper, 3rd Earl of Shaftesbury, and Hutcheson had done, nor on utility as Hume did, but on mutual sympathy, a term best captured in modern parlance by the 20th-century concept of empathy, the capacity to recognise feelings that are being experienced by another being.

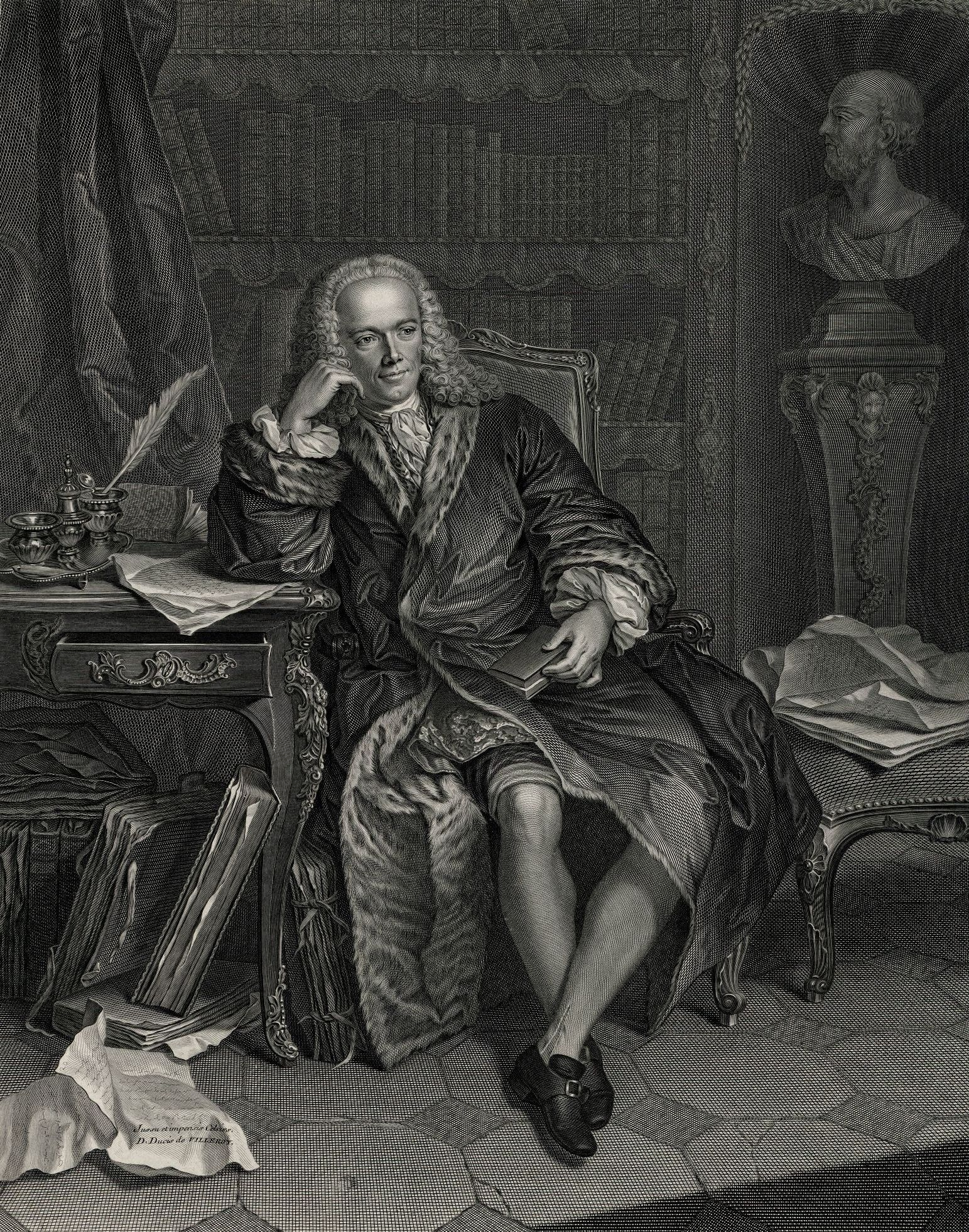
François Quesnay, one of the leaders of the physiocratic school of thought

Following the publication of The Theory of Moral Sentiments, Smith became so popular that many wealthy students left their schools in other countries to enrol at Glasgow to learn under Smith. At this time, Smith began to give more attention to jurisprudence and economics in his lectures and less to his theories of morals. For example, Smith lectured that the cause of increase in national wealth is labour, rather than the nation's quantity of gold or silver, which is the basis for mercantilism, the economic theory that dominated Western European economic policies at the time.

In 1762, the University of Glasgow conferred on Smith the title of Doctor of Laws (LL.D.). At the end of 1763, he obtained an offer from the Chancellor of the Exchequer, Charles Townshend—who had been introduced to Smith by David Hume—to tutor his stepson, Henry Scott, the young Duke of Buccleuch as preparation for a career in international politics. Smith resigned from his professorship in 1764 to take the tutoring position. He subsequently attempted to return the fees he had collected from his students because he had resigned partway through the term, but his students refused.

=== Tutoring, travels, European intellectuals ===
Smith's tutoring job entailed touring Europe with Scott, during which time he educated Scott on a variety of subjects. He was paid £300 per year (plus expenses) along with a £300-per-year pension; roughly twice his former income as a teacher. Smith first travelled as a tutor to Toulouse, France, where he stayed for a year and a half. According to his own account, he found Toulouse to be somewhat boring, having written to Hume that he "had begun to write a book to pass away the time". After touring the south of France the group moved to Geneva, where Smith met the French writer and philosopher Voltaire.

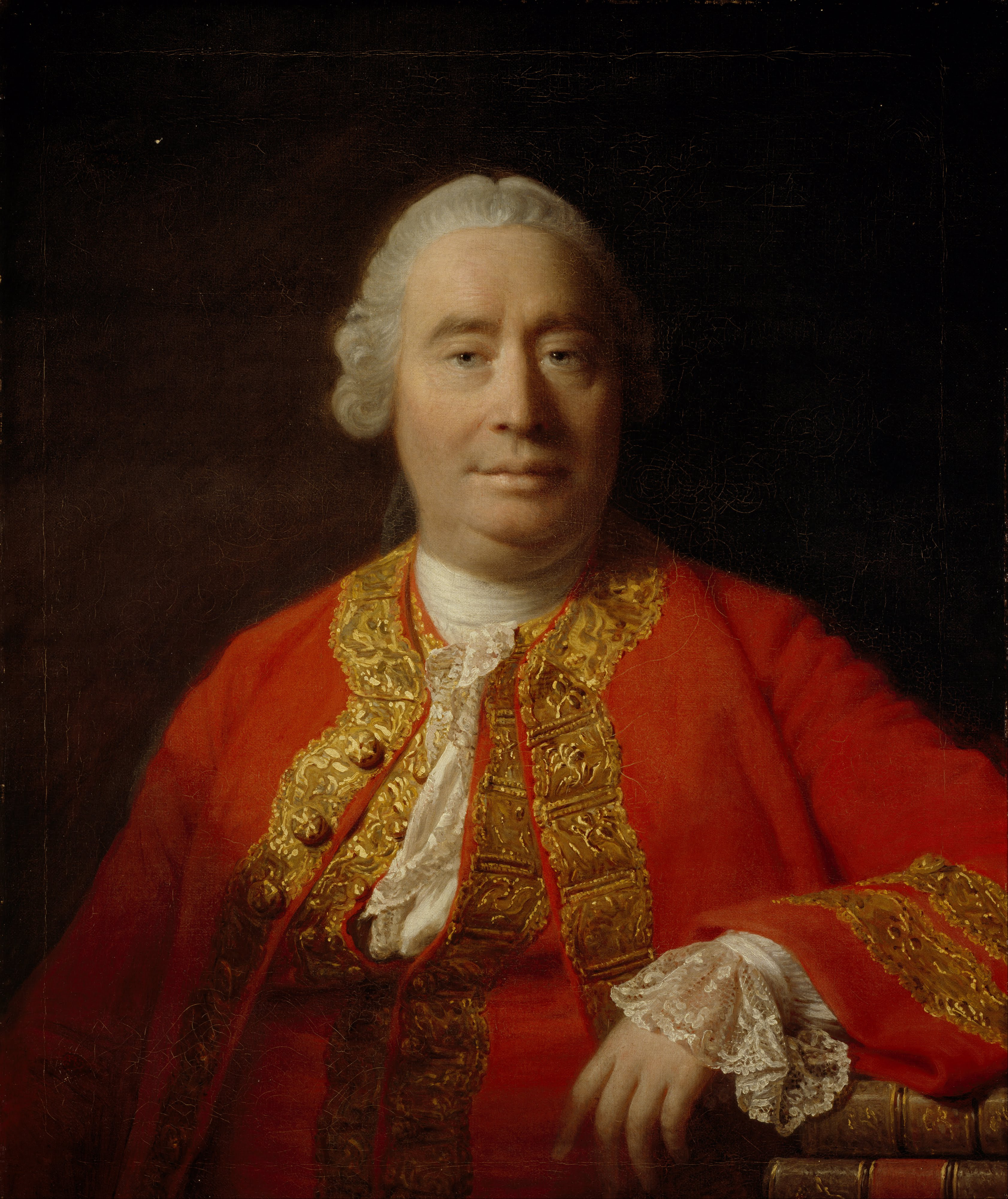
David Hume was a friend and contemporary of Smith's.

From Geneva, the party moved to Paris. Here, Smith met the American publisher and diplomat Benjamin Franklin, who a few years later would lead the opposition in the American colonies against four British resolutions from Charles Townshend (in history known as the Townshend Acts), which threatened American colonial self-government and imposed revenue duties on a number of items necessary to the colonies. In Paris Smith encountered the Physiocracy school founded by François Quesnay and conversed with their intellectuals. Physiocrats were opposed to mercantilism, the dominating economic theory of the time, illustrated in their motto Laissez faire et laissez passer, le monde va de lui même! (Let do and let pass, the world goes on by itself!).

The wealth of France had been virtually depleted by Louis XIV (Note: During the reign of Louis XIV, the population shrunk by 4 million and agricultural productivity was reduced by one-third while the taxes had increased. Cusminsky, Rosa, de Cendrero, 1967, Los Fisiócratas, Buenos Aires: Centro Editor de América Latina, p. 6) and Louis XV in ruinous wars, (Note: 1701–1714 War of the Spanish Succession, 1688–1697 War of the Grand Alliance, 1672–1678 Franco-Dutch War, 1667–1668 War of Devolution, 1618–1648 Thirty Years' War) and was further exhausted in aiding the American revolutionary soldiers, against the British. Given that the British economy of the day yielded an income distribution that stood in contrast to that which existed in France, Smith concluded that "with all its imperfections, [the Physiocratic school] is perhaps the nearest approximation to the truth that has yet been published upon the subject of political economy." The distinction between productive versus unproductive labour—the physiocratic classe steril—was a predominant issue in the development and understanding of what would become classical economic theory.

=== Later years ===
In 1766 Henry Scott's younger brother died in Paris, and Smith's tour as a tutor ended shortly thereafter. Smith returned home that year to Kirkcaldy, and he devoted much of the next decade to writing his magnum opus. There, he befriended Henry Moyes, a young blind man who showed precocious aptitude. Smith secured the patronage of David Hume and Thomas Reid in the young man's education. In May 1767 Smith was elected fellow of the Royal Society of London, and was elected a member of the Literary Club in 1775. The Wealth of Nations was published in 1776 and was an instant success, selling out its first edition in only six months.

In 1778 Smith was appointed to a post as commissioner of customs in Scotland and went to live with his mother (who died in 1784) in Panmure House in the Canongate in Edinburgh. Five years later, as a member of the Philosophical Society of Edinburgh when it received its royal charter, he automatically became one of the founding members of the Royal Society of Edinburgh. From 1787 to 1789 he occupied the honorary position of Lord Rector of the University of Glasgow.

=== Death ===
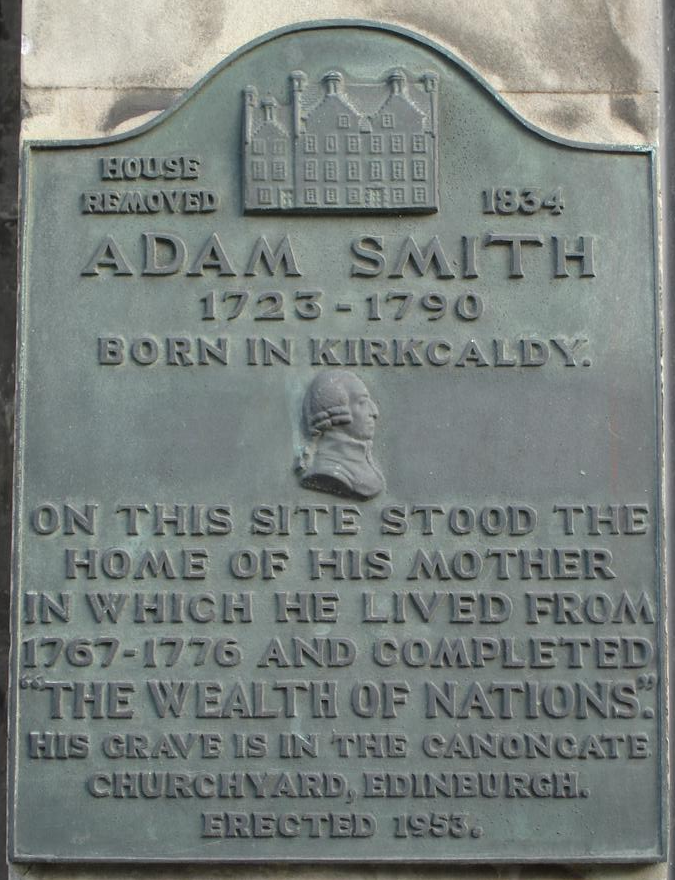
A commemorative plaque for Smith is located in Smith's home town of Kirkcaldy.

Smith died in the northern wing of Panmure House in Edinburgh on 17 July 1790 after a painful illness. His body was buried in the Canongate Kirkyard. On his deathbed, Smith expressed disappointment that he had not achieved more.

Smith's literary executors were two friends from the Scottish academic world: the physicist and chemist Joseph Black and the pioneering geologist James Hutton. Smith left behind many notes and some unpublished material, but gave instructions to destroy anything that was not fit for publication. He mentioned an early unpublished History of Astronomy as probably suitable, and it duly appeared in 1795, along with other material such as Essays on Philosophical Subjects.

Smith's library went by his will to David Douglas, Lord Reston (son of his cousin Colonel Robert Douglas of Strathendry, Fife), who lived with Smith. It was eventually divided between Douglas's two surviving children, Cecilia Margaret (Mrs. Cunningham) and David Anne (Mrs. Bannerman). On the death in 1878 of her husband, the Reverend W. B. Cunningham of Prestonpans, Mrs. Cunningham sold some of the books. The remainder passed to her son, Professor Robert Oliver Cunningham of Queen's College, Belfast, who presented a part to the library of Queen's College. After his death, the remaining books were sold. On the death of Mrs. Bannerman in 1879, her portion of the library went intact to the New College (of the Free Church) in Edinburgh and the collection was transferred to the University of Edinburgh Main Library in 1972.

== Personality and beliefs ==
=== Character ===
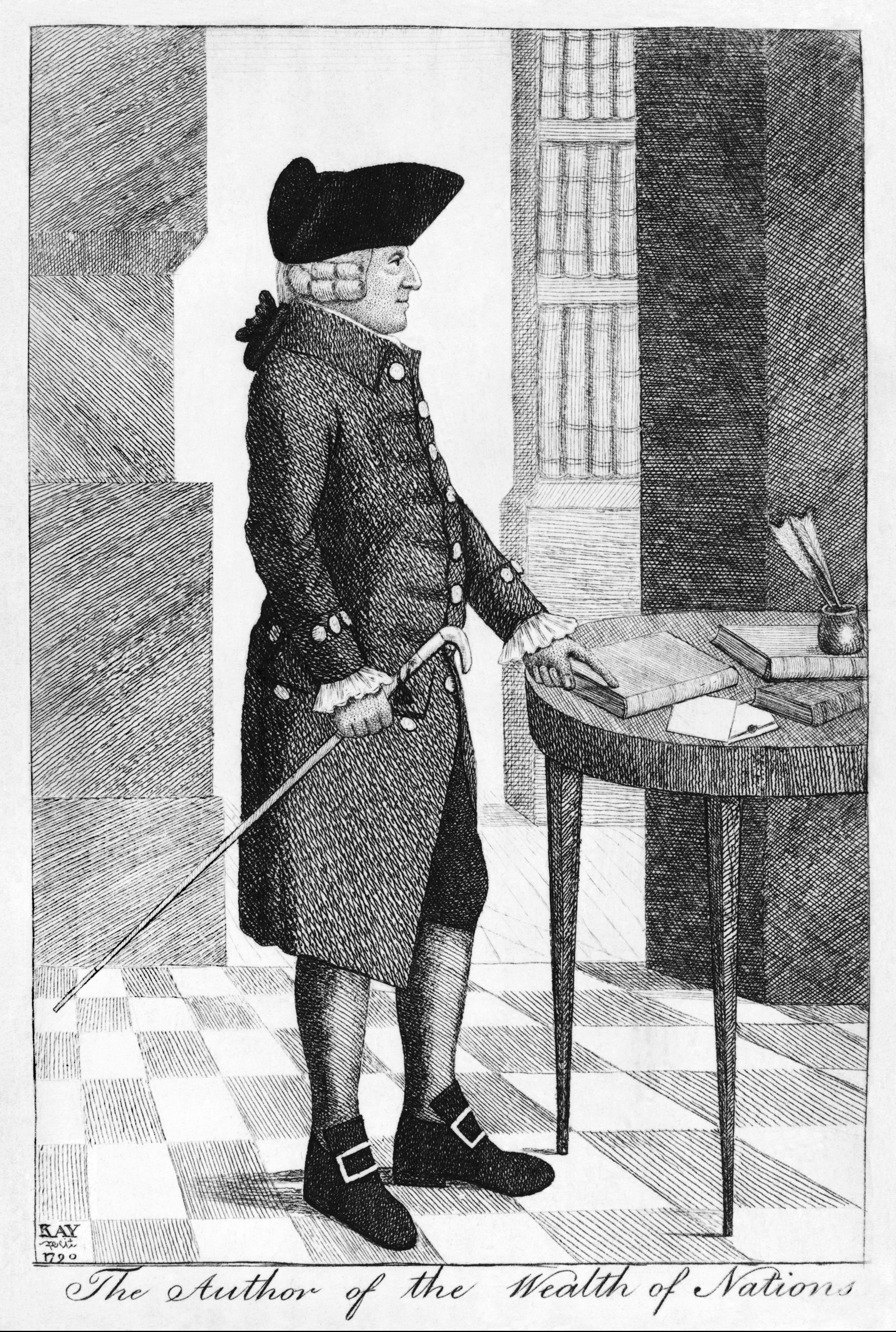
Portrait of Smith by John Kay, 1790

Not much is known about Smith's personal views beyond what can be deduced from his published articles. His personal papers were destroyed after his death, per his request. He never married, and seems to have maintained a close relationship with his mother, with whom he lived after his return from France and who died six years before him.

Smith was described by several of his contemporaries and biographers as comically absent-minded, with peculiar habits of speech and gait, and a smile of "inexpressible benignity". He was known to talk to himself, a habit that began during his childhood when he would smile in rapt conversation with invisible companions. He also had occasional spells of imaginary illness, and he is reported to have had books and papers placed in tall stacks in his study. According to one story, Smith took Charles Townshend on a tour of a tanning factory, and while discussing free trade, Smith walked into a huge tanning pit from which he needed help to escape. He is also said to have put bread and butter into a teapot, drunk the concoction, and declared it to be the worst cup of tea he had ever had. According to another account, Smith distractedly went out walking in his nightgown and ended up 15 miles (24 km) outside town, before nearby church bells brought him back to reality.

James Boswell, who was a student of Smith's at Glasgow University, and later knew him at the Literary Club, says that Smith thought that speaking about his ideas in conversation might reduce the sale of his books, so his conversation was unimpressive. According to Boswell, he once told Sir Joshua Reynolds, that "he made it a rule when in company never to talk of what he understood".

Smith has been alternatively described as someone who "had a large nose, bulging eyes, a protruding lower lip, a nervous twitch, and a speech impediment" and one whose "countenance was manly and agreeable". Smith is said to have acknowledged his looks at one point, saying, "I am a beau in nothing but my books." Smith rarely sat for portraits, so almost all depictions of him created during his lifetime were drawn from memory. The best-known portraits of Smith are the profile by James Tassie and two etchings by John Kay. The line engravings produced for the covers of 19th-century reprints of The Wealth of Nations were based largely on Tassie's medallion.

=== Religious views ===
Considerable scholarly debate has occurred about the nature of Smith's religious views. His father had shown a strong interest in Christianity and belonged to the moderate wing of the Church of Scotland, and the fact that he received the Snell Exhibition suggests that he may have gone to Oxford with the intention of pursuing a career in the Church of England.

The British economist Ronald Coase challenged the view that Smith was a deist, based on the fact that Smith's writings never explicitly invoke God as an explanation of the harmonies of the natural or the human worlds. According to Coase, though Smith does sometimes refer to the "Great Architect of the Universe", later scholars such as Jacob Viner have "very much exaggerated the extent to which Adam Smith was committed to a belief in a personal God", a belief for which Coase finds little evidence in passages such as the one in the Wealth of Nations in which Smith writes that the curiosity of mankind about the "great phenomena of nature", such as "the generation, the life, growth, and dissolution of plants and animals", has led men to "enquire into their causes", and that "superstition first attempted to satisfy this curiosity, by referring all those wonderful appearances to the immediate agency of the gods. Philosophy afterwards endeavoured to account for them, from more familiar causes, or from such as mankind were better acquainted with than the agency of the gods". Some authors argue that Smith's social and economic philosophy is inherently theological and that his entire model of social order is logically dependent on the notion of God's action in nature. Brendan Long argues that Smith was a theist, whereas according to Gavin Kennedy, Smith was "in some sense" a Christian.

Smith was also a close friend of David Hume, who, despite debate about his religious views in modern scholarship, was commonly characterised in his own time as an atheist. The publication in 1777 of Smith's letter to William Strahan, in which he described Hume's courage in the face of death in spite of his irreligiosity, attracted considerable controversy.

== Published works ==
=== The Theory of Moral Sentiments ===
In 1759 Smith published his first work, The Theory of Moral Sentiments, sold by the co-publishers Andrew Millar of London and Alexander Kincaid of Edinburgh. Smith continued making extensive revisions to the book until his death. (Note: The 6 editions of The Theory of Moral Sentiments were published in 1759, 1761, 1767, 1774, 1781, and 1790, respectively.) Although The Wealth of Nations is widely regarded as Smith's most influential work, Smith himself is believed to have considered The Theory of Moral Sentiments to be a superior work.

In the work, Smith critically examines the moral thinking of his time, and suggests that conscience arises from dynamic and interactive social relationships through which people seek "mutual sympathy of sentiments." His goal in writing the work was to explain the source of mankind's ability to form moral judgement, given that people begin life with no moral sentiments at all. Smith proposes a theory of sympathy, in which the act of observing others and seeing the judgements they form of both others and oneself makes people aware of themselves and how others perceive their behaviour. The feedback received by an individual from perceiving (or imagining) others' judgement creates an incentive to achieve "mutual sympathy of sentiments" with them and leads people to develop habits, and then principles, of behaviour, which come to constitute one's conscience.

While scholars have historically recognised a conflict – often phrased the "Adam Smith Problem"-between the exaggeration on sympathy in The Theory of Moral Sentiments and self-interest in The Wealth of Nations, modern scholarship largely overlooks this contradiction. Instead the two works are widely seen as part of a unified system of moral and economic philosophy that are able to co-exist and complement each other. These scholars contend that in The Theory of Moral Sentiments, Smith develops a theory of psychology in which individuals seek the approval of the "impartial spectator" as a result of a natural desire to have outside observers sympathise with their sentiments. Rather than viewing The Theory of Moral Sentiments and The Wealth of Nations as presenting incompatible views of human nature, some Smith scholars regard the works as emphasising different aspects of human nature that vary depending on the situation. In the first part – The Theory of Moral Sentiments – he laid down the foundation of his vision of humanity and society. In the second – The Wealth of Nations – he elaborated on the virtue of prudence, which for him meant the relations between people in the private sphere of the economy. It was his plan to further elaborate on the virtue of justice in the third book. James Otteson argues that both books are Newtonian in their methodology and deploy a similar "market model" for explaining the creation and development of large-scale human social orders, including morality, economics, as well as language. Robert Ekelund and Hebert offer a differing view, observing that self-interest is present in both works and that "in the former, sympathy is the moral faculty that holds self-interest in check, whereas in the latter, competition is the economic faculty that restrains self-interest."

=== The Wealth of Nations ===
Disagreement exists between classical and neoclassical economists about the central message of Smith's most influential work: An Inquiry into the Nature and Causes of the Wealth of Nations (1776). Neoclassical economists emphasise Smith's invisible hand, a concept mentioned in the middle of his work – Book IV, Chapter II – and classical economists believe that Smith stated his programme for promoting the "wealth of nations" in the first sentences, which attributes the growth of wealth and prosperity to the division of labour. He elaborated on the virtue of prudence, which for him meant the relations between people in the private sphere of the economy. He planned to further elaborate on the virtue of justice in the third book.

Smith used the term "the invisible hand" in "History of Astronomy" referring to "the invisible hand of Jupiter", and once in each of his The Theory of Moral Sentiments (1759) and The Wealth of Nations (1776). This last statement about "an invisible hand" has been interpreted in numerous ways.

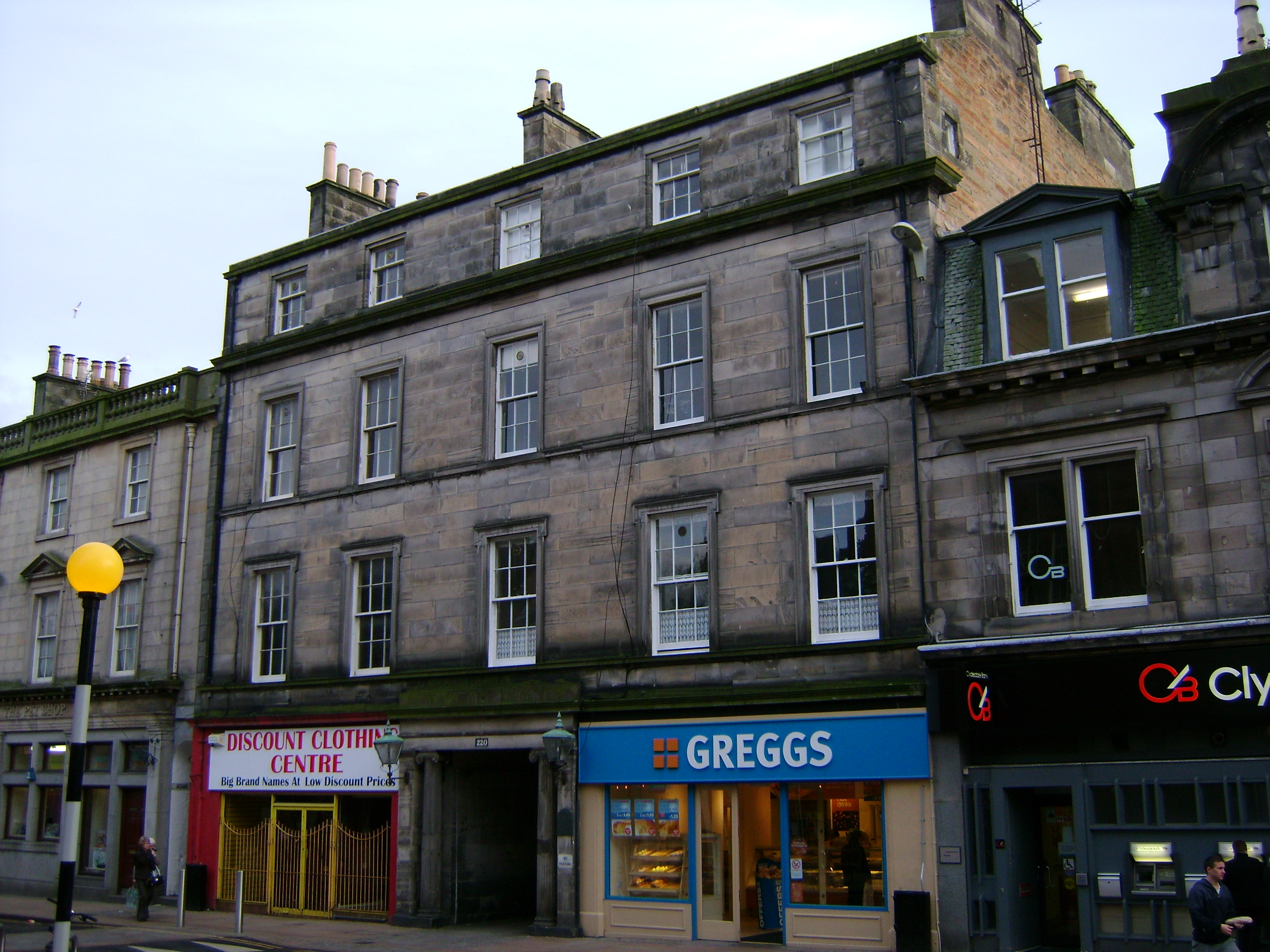
Later building on the site where Smith wrote The Wealth of Nations

As every individual, therefore, endeavours as much as he can both to employ his capital in the support of domestic industry, and so to direct that industry that its produce may be of the greatest value; every individual necessarily labours to render the annual revenue of the society as great as he can. He generally, indeed, neither intends to promote the public interest, nor knows how much he is promoting it. By preferring the support of domestic to that of foreign industry, he intends only his own security; and by directing that industry in such a manner as its produce may be of the greatest value, he intends only his own gain, and he is in this, as in many other cases, led by an invisible hand to promote an end which was no part of his intention. Nor is it always the worse for the society that it was no part of it. By pursuing his own interest he frequently promotes that of the society more effectually than when he really intends to promote it. I have never known much good done by those who affected to trade for the public good. It is an affectation, indeed, not very common among merchants, and very few words need be employed in dissuading them from it.

Those who regard that statement as Smith's central message also quote frequently Smith's dictum:

It is not from the benevolence of the butcher, the brewer, or the baker, that we expect our dinner, but from their regard to their own interest. We address ourselves, not to their humanity but to their self-love, and never talk to them of our own necessities but of their advantages.

However, in The Theory of Moral Sentiments he had a more sceptical approach to self-interest as driver of behaviour:

How selfish soever man may be supposed, there are evidently some principles in his nature, which interest him in the fortune of others, and render their happiness necessary to him, though he derives nothing from it except the pleasure of seeing it.

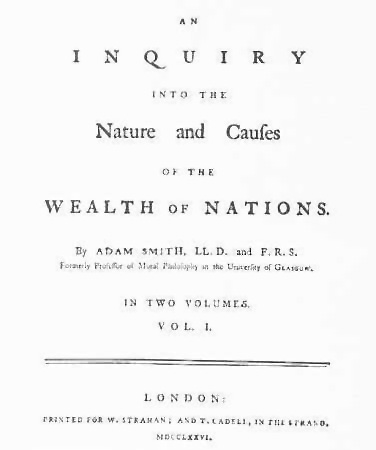
The first page of The Wealth of Nations, 1776 London edition

In relation to Bernard Mandeville's contention that "Private Vices ... may be turned into Public Benefits", Smith's belief that when an individual pursues his self-interest under conditions of justice, he unintentionally promotes the good of society. Self-interested competition in the free market, he argued, would tend to benefit society as a whole by keeping prices low, while still building in an incentive for a wide variety of goods and services. Nevertheless, he was wary of businessmen and warned of their "conspiracy against the public or in some other contrivance to raise prices." Again and again, Smith warned of the collusive nature of business interests, which may form cabals or monopolies, fixing the highest price "which can be squeezed out of the buyers." Smith also warned that a business-dominated political system would allow a conspiracy of businesses and industry against consumers, with the former scheming to influence politics and legislation. Smith states that the interest of manufacturers and merchants "in any particular branch of trade or manufactures, is always in some respects different from, and even opposite to, that of the public ... The proposal of any new law or regulation of commerce which comes from this order, ought always to be listened to with great precaution, and ought never be adopted till after having been long and carefully examined, not only with the most scrupulous but with the most suspicious attention." Thus Smith's chief worry seems to be when business is given special protections or privileges from government; by contrast, in the absence of such special political favours, he believed that business activities were generally beneficial to the whole society:

It is the great multiplication of the production of all the different arts, in consequence of the division of labour, which occasions, in a well-governed society, that universal opulence which extends itself to the lowest ranks of the people. Every workman has a great quantity of his own work to dispose of beyond what he himself has occasion for; and every other workman being exactly in the same situation, he is enabled to exchange a great quantity of his own goods for a great quantity, or, what comes to the same thing, for the price of a great quantity of theirs. He supplies them abundantly with what they have occasion for, and they accommodate him as amply with what he has occasion for, and a general plenty diffuses itself through all the different ranks of society. (The Wealth of Nations, I.i.10)

The neoclassical interest in Smith's statement about "an invisible hand" originates in the possibility of seeing it as a precursor of neoclassical economics and its concept of general equilibrium; Paul Samuelson's "Economics" refers six times to Smith's "invisible hand". To emphasise this connection, Samuelson quotes Smith's "invisible hand" statement substituting "general interest" for "public interest". Samuelson concludes: "Smith was unable to prove the essence of his invisible-hand doctrine. Indeed, until the 1940s, no one knew how to prove, even to state properly, the kernel of truth in this proposition about perfectly competitive market."

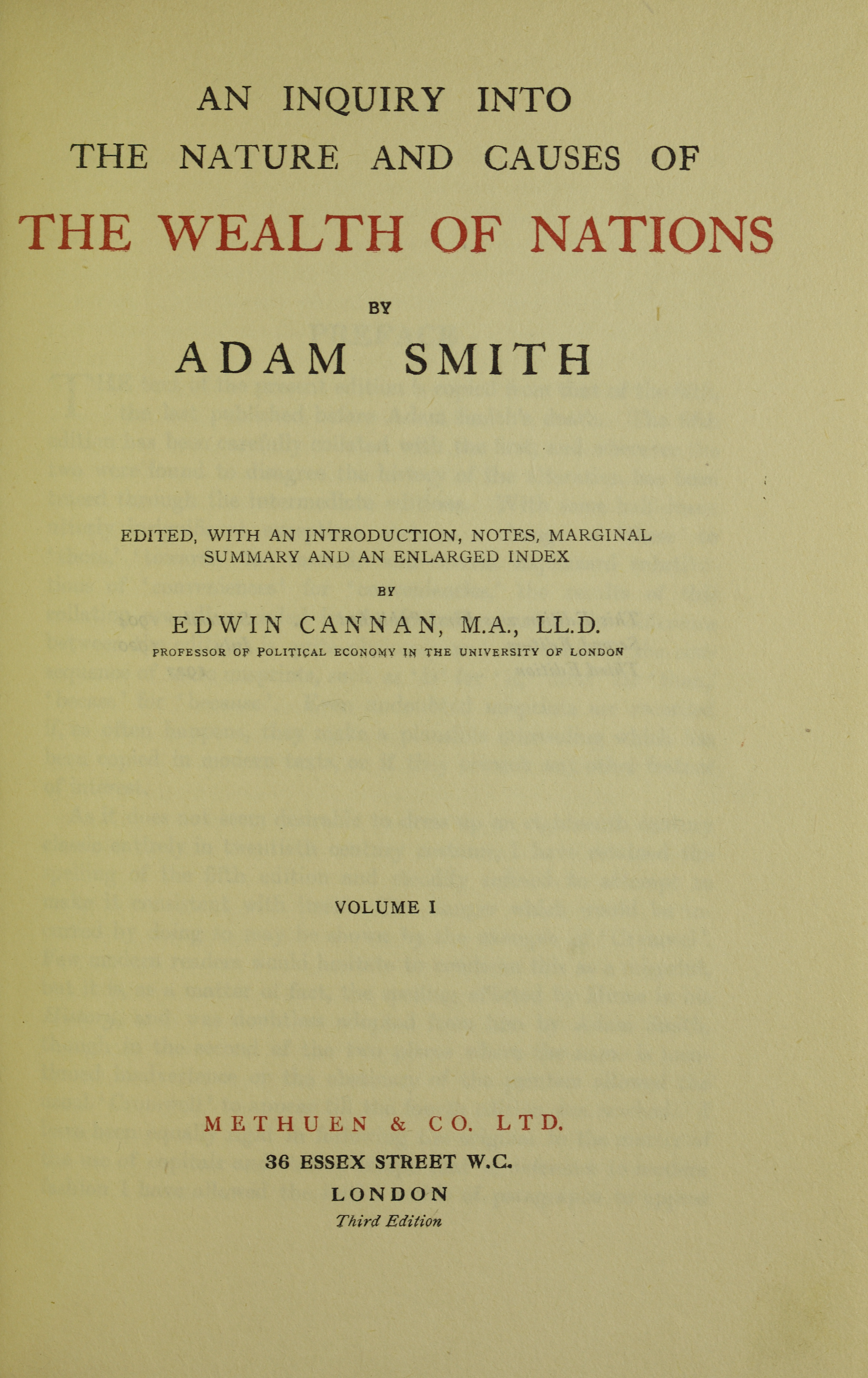
1922 printing of An Inquiry into the Nature and Causes of the Wealth of Nations, edited by Edwin Cannan

Conversely, classical economists see in Smith's first sentences his programme to promote "The Wealth of Nations". Using the physiocratical concept of the economy as a circular process, to secure growth the inputs of Period 2 must exceed the inputs of Period 1. Therefore, those outputs of Period 1 which are not used or usable as inputs of Period 2 are regarded as unproductive labour, as they do not contribute to growth. This is what Smith had heard in France from, among others, François Quesnay, whose ideas Smith was so impressed by that he might have dedicated The Wealth of Nations to him had he not died beforehand. To this French insight that unproductive labour should be reduced to use labour more productively, Smith added his own proposal, that productive labour should be made even more productive by deepening the division of labour. Smith argued that deepening the division of labour under competition leads to greater productivity, which leads to lower prices and thus an increasing standard of living—"general plenty" and "universal opulence"—for all. Extended markets and increased production lead to the continuous reorganisation of production and the invention of new ways of producing, which in turn lead to further increased production, lower prices, and improved standards of living. Smith's central message is, therefore, that under dynamic competition, a growth machine secures "The Wealth of Nations". Smith's argument predicted Britain's evolution as the workshop of the world, underselling and outproducing all its competitors. The opening sentences of the "Wealth of Nations" summarise this policy:

The annual labour of every nation is the fund which originally supplies it with all the necessaries and conveniences of life which it annually consumes ... . [T]his produce ... bears a greater or smaller proportion to the number of those who are to consume it ... .[B]ut this proportion must in every nation be regulated by two different circumstances;

- first, by the skill, dexterity, and judgement with which its labour is generally applied; and,
- secondly, by the proportion between the number of those who are employed in useful labour, and that of those who are not so employed [emphasis added].

However, Smith added that the "abundance or scantiness of this supply too seems to depend more upon the former of those two circumstances than upon the latter."

In The Wealth of Nations Smith states four maxims of taxation: (1) equality (people must contribute to the support of the government in proportion to their abilities), (2) certainty (the time, manner and quantity of tax imposed must be certain, transparent and not arbitrary), (3) convenience for taxpayers, and (4) economy in tax collection. According to Smith, "It is not very unreasonable that the rich should contribute to the public expense, not only in proportion to their revenue, but something more in that proportion".

Smith wrote that a government is duty-bound to provide public services that "support the whole of society" like provide public education, transportation, national defence, a justice system, public safety, and public infrastructure to support commerce.

=== Other works ===
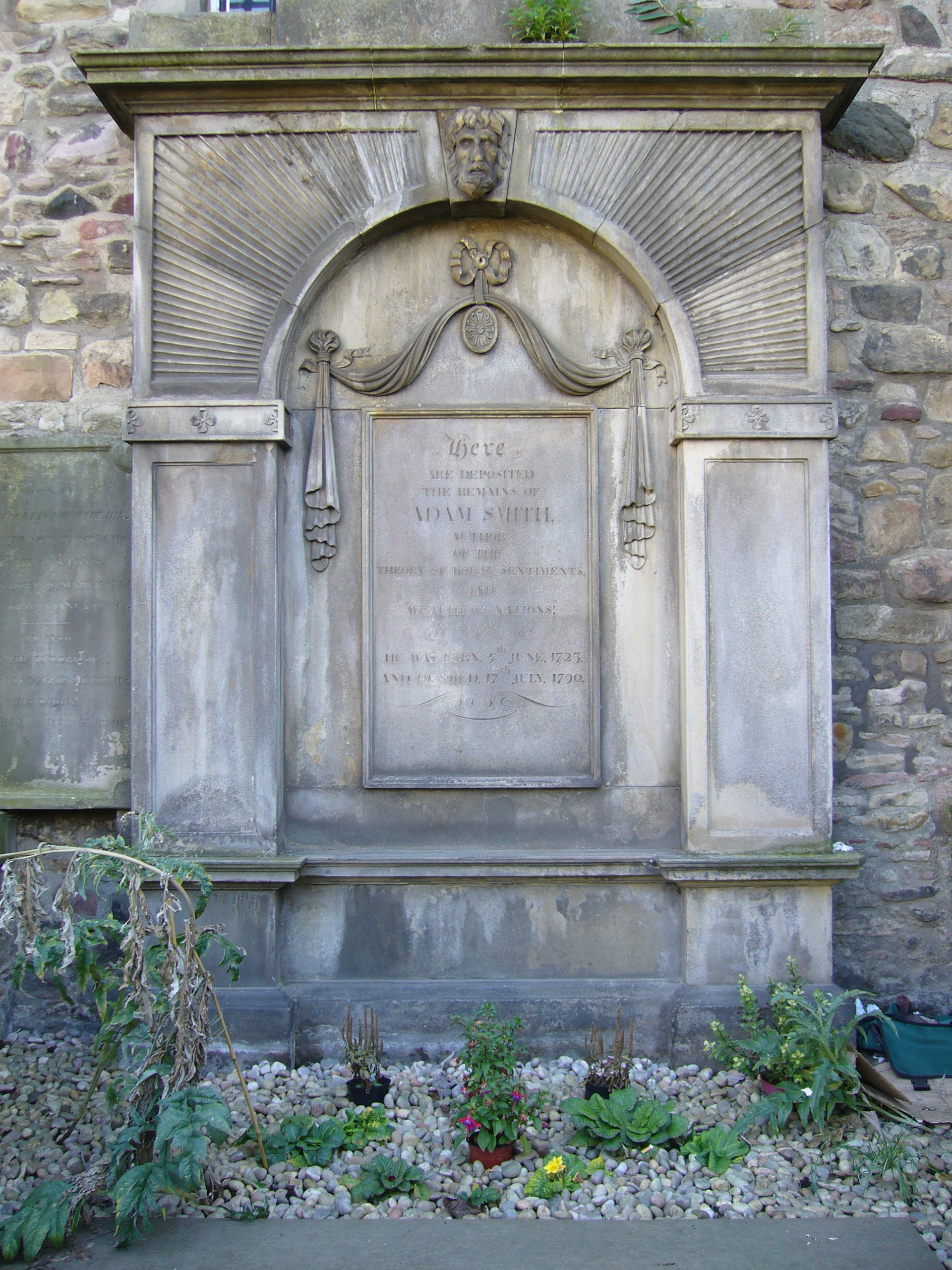
Smith's burial place in Canongate Kirkyard

Shortly before his death, Smith had nearly all his manuscripts destroyed. In his last years, he seemed to have been planning two major treatises, one on the theory and history of law and one on the sciences and arts. The posthumously published Essays on Philosophical Subjects, a history of astronomy down to Smith's own era, plus some thoughts on ancient physics and metaphysics, probably contain parts of what would have been the latter treatise. Lectures on Jurisprudence were notes taken from Smith's early lectures, plus an early draft of The Wealth of Nations, published as part of the 1976 Glasgow Edition of the works and correspondence of Smith. Other works, including some published posthumously, include Lectures on Justice, Police, Revenue, and Arms (1763) (first published in 1896); and Essays on Philosophical Subjects (1795).

== Legacy ==
=== In economics and moral philosophy ===
The Wealth of Nations was a precursor to the modern academic discipline of economics. In this and other works, Smith expounded how rational self-interest and competition can lead to economic prosperity. Smith was controversial in his own day and his general approach and writing style were often satirised by Tory writers in the moralising tradition of Hogarth and Swift, as a discussion at the University of Winchester suggests. In 2005 The Wealth of Nations was named among the 100 Best Scottish Books of all time.

In light of the arguments put forward by Smith and other economic theorists in Britain, academic belief in mercantilism began to decline in Britain in the late 18th century. During the Industrial Revolution, Britain embraced free trade and Smith's laissez-faire economics, and via the British Empire, used its power to spread a broadly liberal economic model around the world, characterised by open markets, and relatively barrier-free domestic and international trade.

George Stigler attributes to Smith "the most important substantive proposition in all of economics". It is that, under competition, owners of resources (for example labour, land, and capital) will use them most profitably, resulting in an equal rate of return in equilibrium for all uses, adjusted for apparent differences arising from such factors as training, trust, hardship, and unemployment.

Paul Samuelson finds in Smith's pluralist use of supply and demand as applied to wages, rents, and profit a valid and valuable anticipation of the general equilibrium modelling of Léon Walras a century later. Smith's allowance for wage increases in the short and intermediate term from capital accumulation and invention contrasted with Thomas Robert Malthus, David Ricardo, and Karl Marx in their propounding a rigid subsistence–wage theory of labour supply.

Joseph Schumpeter criticised Smith for a lack of technical rigour, yet he argued that this enabled Smith's writings to appeal to wider audiences: "His very limitation made for success. Had he been more brilliant, he would not have been taken so seriously. Had he dug more deeply, had he unearthed more recondite truth, had he used more difficult and ingenious methods, he would not have been understood. But he had no such ambitions; in fact he disliked whatever went beyond plain common sense. He never moved above the heads of even the dullest readers. He led them on gently, encouraging them by trivialities and homely observations, making them feel comfortable all along."

Classical economists presented competing theories to those of Smith, termed the "labour theory of value". Later Marxian economics descending from classical economics also use Smith's labour theories, in part. The first volume of Marx's major work, Das Kapital, was published in German in 1867. In it Marx focused on the labour theory of value and what he considered to be the exploitation of labour by capital. The labour theory of value held that the value of a thing was determined by the labour that went into its production. This contrasts with the modern contention of neoclassical economics, that the value of a thing is determined by what one is willing to give up to obtain the thing. Frédéric Bastiat advocated a similar theory, that the value of a thing or service was its utility, or usefulness, to others. One example he used was of one finding a large diamond after having done little labour; yet it was still valuable because others wanted it.

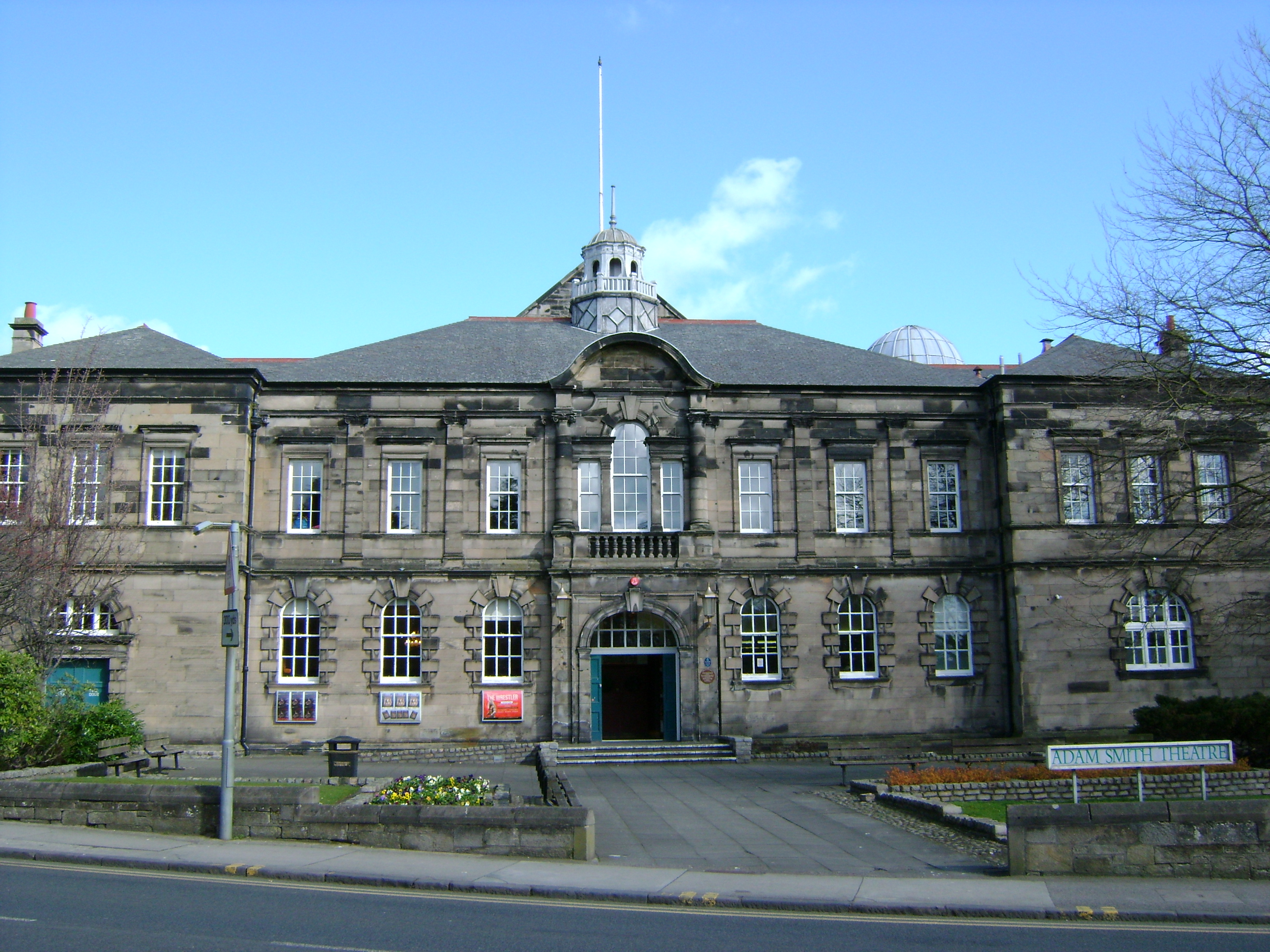
The Adam Smith Theatre in Kirkcaldy

The body of theory later termed "neoclassical economics" or "marginalism" formed from about 1870 to 1910. The term "economics" was popularised by such neoclassical economists as Alfred Marshall as a concise synonym for "economic science" and a substitute for the earlier, broader term "political economy" used by Smith. This corresponded to the influence on the subject of mathematical methods used in the natural sciences. Neoclassical economics systematised supply and demand as joint determinants of price and quantity in market equilibrium, affecting both the allocation of output and the distribution of income. It dispensed with the labour theory of value of which Smith was most famously identified with in classical economics, in favour of a marginal utility theory of value on the demand side and a more general theory of costs on the supply side.

The bicentennial anniversary of the publication of The Wealth of Nations was celebrated in 1976, resulting in increased interest for The Theory of Moral Sentiments and his other works throughout academia. After 1976 Smith was more likely to be represented as the author of both The Wealth of Nations and The Theory of Moral Sentiments, and thereby as the founder of a moral philosophy and the science of economics. His homo economicus or "economic man" was also more often represented as a moral person. Additionally, economists David Levy and Sandra Peart in "The Secret History of the Dismal Science" point to his opposition to hierarchy and beliefs in equality, including racial equality, and provide additional support for those who point to Smith's opposition to slavery, colonialism, and empire. Emphasised also are Smith's statements of the need for high wages for the poor, and the efforts to keep wages low. In The "Vanity of the Philosopher: From Equality to Hierarchy in Postclassical Economics", Peart and Levy also cite Smith's view that a common street porter was not intellectually inferior to a philosopher, and point to the need for greater appreciation of the public views in discussions of science and other subjects now considered to be technical. They also cite Smith's opposition to the often expressed view that science is superior to common sense.

Smith also explained the relationship between growth of private property and civil government:

Men may live together in society with some tolerable degree of security, though there is no civil magistrate to protect them from the injustice of those passions. But avarice and ambition in the rich, in the poor the hatred of labour and the love of present ease and enjoyment, are the passions which prompt to invade property, passions much more steady in their operation, and much more universal in their influence. Wherever there is great property there is great inequality. For one very rich man there must be at least five hundred poor, and the affluence of the few supposes the indigence of the many. The affluence of the rich excites the indignation of the poor, who are often both driven by want, and prompted by envy, to invade his possessions. It is only under the shelter of the civil magistrate that the owner of that valuable property, which is acquired by the labour of many years, or perhaps of many successive generations, can sleep a single night in security. He is at all times surrounded by unknown enemies, whom, though he never provoked, he can never appease, and from whose injustice he can be protected only by the powerful arm of the civil magistrate continually held up to chastise it. The acquisition of valuable and extensive property, therefore, necessarily requires the establishment of civil government. Where there is no property, or at least none that exceeds the value of two or three days' labour, civil government is not so necessary. Civil government supposes a certain subordination. But as the necessity of civil government gradually grows up with the acquisition of valuable property, so the principal causes which naturally introduce subordination gradually grow up with the growth of that valuable property. (...) Men of inferior wealth combine to defend those of superior wealth in the possession of their property, in order that men of superior wealth may combine to defend them in the possession of theirs. All the inferior shepherds and herdsmen feel that the security of their own herds and flocks depends upon the security of those of the great shepherd or herdsman; that the maintenance of their lesser authority depends upon that of his greater authority, and that upon their subordination to him depends his power of keeping their inferiors in subordination to them. They constitute a sort of little nobility, who feel themselves interested to defend the property and to support the authority of their own little sovereign in order that he may be able to defend their property and to support their authority. Civil government, so far as it is instituted for the security of property, is in reality instituted for the defence of the rich against the poor, or of those who have some property against those who have none at all.

=== In British imperial debates ===
Smith opposed empire. He challenged ideas that colonies were key to British prosperity and power. He rejected that other cultures, such as China and India, were culturally and developmentally inferior to Europe. While he favoured "commercial society", he did not support radical social change and the imposition of commercial society on other societies. He proposed that colonies be given independence or that full political rights be extended to colonial subjects.

Smith's chapter on colonies, in turn, would help shape British imperial debates from the mid-19th century onward. The Wealth of Nations would become an ambiguous text regarding the imperial question. In his chapter on colonies, Smith pondered how to solve the crisis developing across the Atlantic among the empire's 13 American colonies. He offered two different proposals for easing tensions. The first proposal called for giving the colonies their independence, and by thus parting on a friendly basis, Britain would be able to develop and maintain a free-trade relationship with them, and possibly even an informal military alliance. Smith's second proposal called for a theoretical imperial federation that would bring the colonies and the metropole closer together through an imperial parliamentary system and imperial free trade.

Smith's most prominent disciple in 19th-century Britain, the peace-advocate Richard Cobden, preferred the first proposal. Cobden would lead the Anti-Corn Law League in overturning the Corn Laws in 1846, shifting Britain to a policy of free trade and empire "on the cheap" for decades to come. This hands-off approach toward the British Empire would become known as Cobdenism or the Manchester School. By the turn of the century, however, advocates of Smith's second proposal such as Joseph Shield Nicholson would become ever more vocal in opposing Cobdenism, calling instead for imperial federation. As Marc-William Palen notes: "On the one hand, Adam Smith's late nineteenth and early twentieth-century Cobdenite adherents used his theories to argue for gradual imperial devolution and empire 'on the cheap'. On the other, various proponents of imperial federation throughout the British World sought to use Smith's theories to overturn the predominant Cobdenite hands-off imperial approach and instead, with a firm grip, bring the empire closer than ever before." Smith's ideas thus played an important part in subsequent debates over the British Empire.

=== Portraits, monuments, and banknotes ===
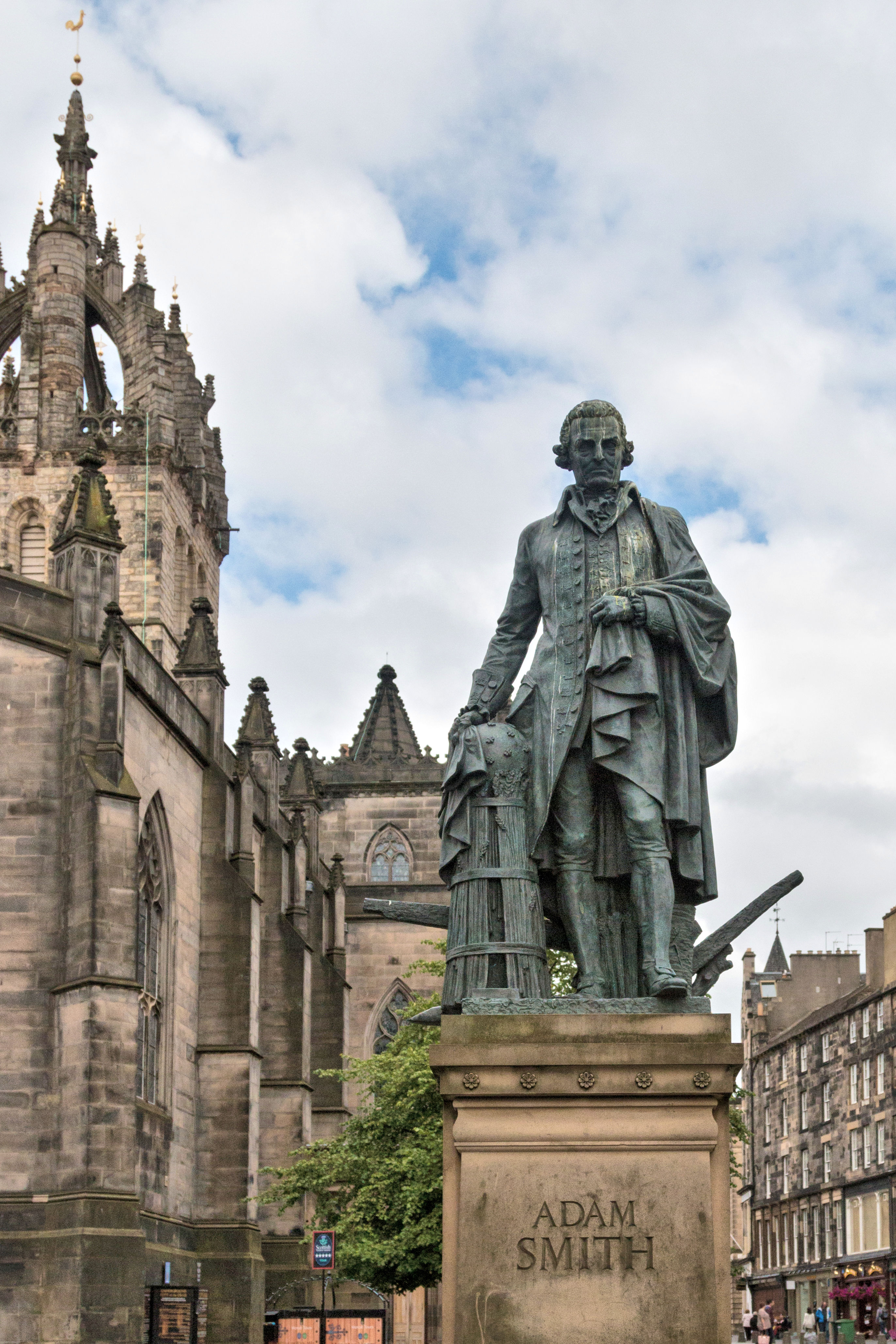
A statue of Smith on High Street in Edinburgh, erected through private donations organised by the Adam Smith Institute

Smith has been commemorated in the UK on banknotes printed by two different banks; his portrait has appeared since 1981 on the £50 notes issued by the Clydesdale Bank in Scotland, and in March 2007 Smith's image also appeared on the new series of £20 notes issued by the Bank of England, making him the first Scotsman to feature on an English banknote.

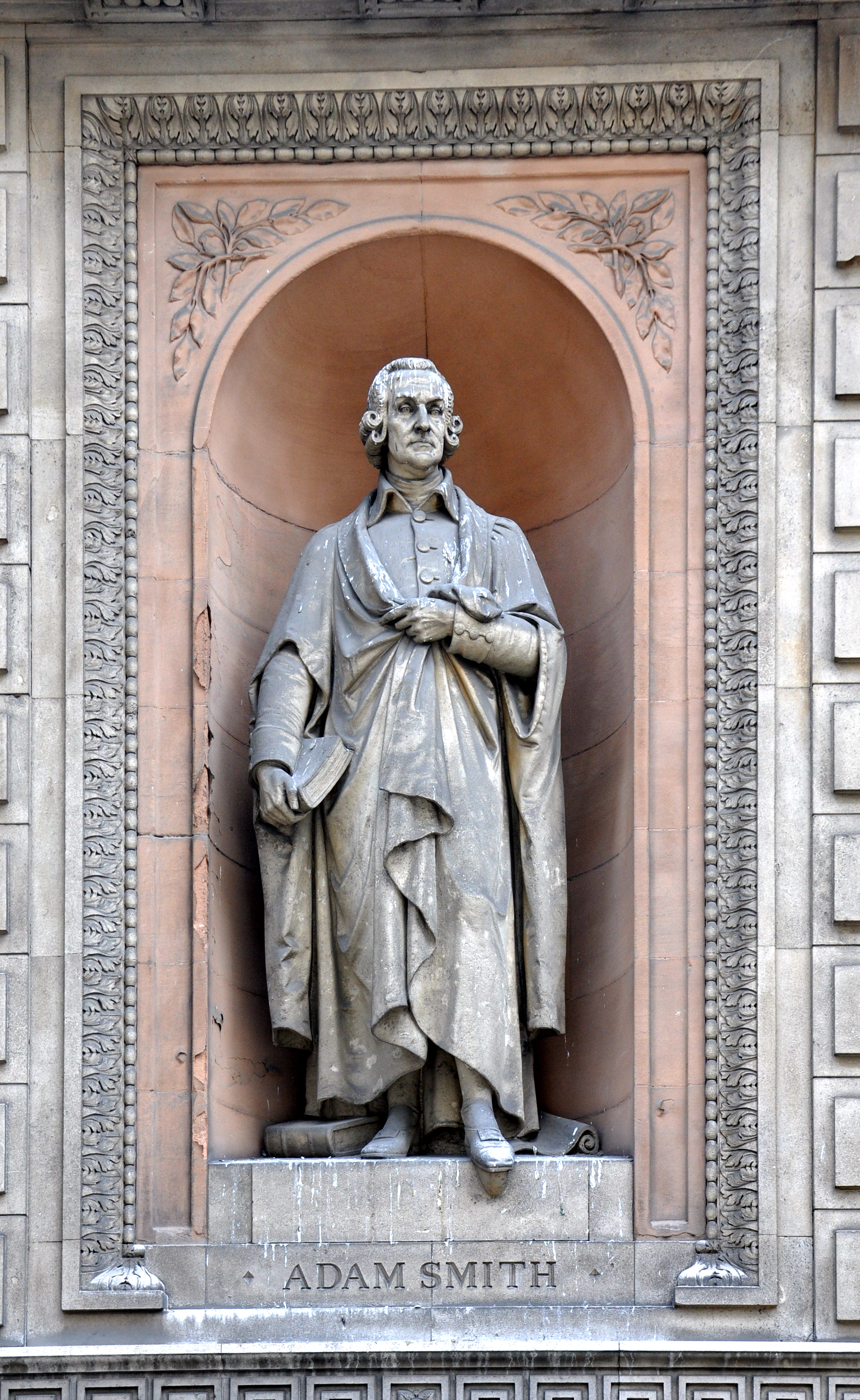
A statue of Smith built in 1867–1870 at the old headquarters of the University of London, 6 Burlington Gardens

Between 1867 and 1870, a statue of Smith was built into the outside wall of 6 Burlington Gardens, then the headquarters of the University of London (now home to the Royal Academy of Arts). A large-scale memorial of Smith by Alexander Stoddart was unveiled on 4 July 2008 in Edinburgh. It is a 10-foot (3.0 m)-tall bronze sculpture and it stands above the Royal Mile outside St Giles' Cathedral in Parliament Square, near the Mercat cross. Sculptor Jim Sanborn has created multiple pieces which feature Smith's work. At Central Connecticut State University is Circulating Capital, a tall cylinder which features an extract from The Wealth of Nations on the lower half, and on the upper half, some of the same text, but represented in binary code. At the University of North Carolina at Charlotte, outside the Belk College of Business Administration, is Adam Smith's Spinning Top. Another Smith sculpture is at Cleveland State University. Smith also appears as the narrator in the 2013 play The Low Road, centred on a proponent on laissez-faire economics in the late 18th century, but dealing obliquely with the 2008 financial crisis and the Great Recession; he was portrayed by Bill Paterson in the premiere production at the Royal Court Theatre in London.

A bust of Smith is in the Hall of Heroes of the National Wallace Monument in Stirling. Five paving stones, displaying quotations from Smith's works, were unveiled in December 2023 on High Street in Glasgow. They were commissioned by the University of Glasgow to mark the 300th anniversary of Smith's birth.

=== Panmure House ===
Adam Smith resided at Panmure House from 1778 to 1790. In 2008, the house was purchased by the Edinburgh Business School at Heriot-Watt University and funds were raised for its restoration. In 2018 it was formally opened as a study centre in Smith's honour.

=== As a symbol of free-market economics ===
Smith has been celebrated by advocates of free-market policies as the founder of free-market economics, a view reflected in the naming of bodies such as the Adam Smith Institute in London, multiple entities known as the "Adam Smith Society", including an historical Italian organisation, and the US-based Adam Smith Society, and the Australian Adam Smith Club, and in terms such as the Adam Smith necktie.

Alan Greenspan, former chair of the American central bank, the Federal Reserve, argues that, while Smith did not coin the term laissez-faire, "it was left to Adam Smith to identify the more-general set of principles that brought conceptual clarity to the seeming chaos of market transactions." Greenspan continues that The Wealth of Nations was "one of the great achievements in human intellectual history." P. J. O'Rourke describes Smith as the "founder of free market economics."

The Nobel laureate economist Milton Friedman believed in 1976, 200 years after the publishing of The Wealth of Nations, that the work of Adam Smith was, "...far more immediately relevant today than he was at the Centennial of The Wealth of Nations in 1876."

Other writers have argued that Smith's support for laissez-faire (which in French means leave alone) has been overstated. Herbert Stein wrote that the people who "wear an Adam Smith necktie" do it to "make a statement of their devotion to the idea of free markets and limited government", and that this misrepresents Smith's ideas. Stein writes that Smith "was not pure or doctrinaire about this idea. He viewed government intervention in the market with great skepticism...yet he was prepared to accept or propose qualifications to that policy in the specific cases where he judged that their net effect would be beneficial and would not undermine the basically free character of the system. He did not wear the Adam Smith necktie." In Stein's reading, The Wealth of Nations could justify the Food and Drug Administration, the Consumer Product Safety Commission, mandatory employer health benefits, environmentalism, and "discriminatory taxation to deter improper or luxurious behavior".

Similarly, Vivienne Brown stated in The Economic Journal that in the 20th-century United States, supporters of Reaganomics, The Wall Street Journal, and other similar sources have spread among the general public a partial and misleading vision of Smith, portraying him as an "extreme dogmatic defender of laissez-faire capitalism and supply-side economics". In fact, The Wealth of Nations includes the following statement on the payment of taxes:

The subjects of every state ought to contribute towards the support of the government, as nearly as possible, in proportion to their respective abilities; that is, in proportion to the revenue which they respectively enjoy under the protection of the state.

Some commentators have argued that Smith's works show support for a progressive, not flat, income tax and that he specifically named taxes that he thought should be required by the state, among them luxury-goods taxes and tax on rent. Yet Smith argued for the "impossibility of taxing the people, in proportion to their economic revenue, by any capitation". Smith argued that taxes should principally go toward protecting "justice" and "certain publick institutions" that were necessary for the benefit of all of society, which could not be adequately provided by private enterprise.

Additionally, Smith outlined the proper expenses of the government in The Wealth of Nations, Book V, Ch. I. Included in his requirements of a government is to enforce contracts and provide a justice system, grant patents and copy rights, provide public goods such as infrastructure, provide national defence, and regulate banking. The role of the government was to provide goods "of such a nature that the profit could never repay the expense to any individual" such as roads, bridges, canals, and harbours. He also encouraged invention and new ideas through his patent enforcement and support of infant industry monopolies. He supported partial public subsidies for elementary education, and he believed that competition among religious institutions would provide general benefit to the society. In such cases, Smith argued for local rather than centralised control: "Even those publick works which are of such a nature that they cannot afford any revenue for maintaining themselves ... are always better maintained by a local or provincial revenue, under the management of a local and provincial administration, than by the general revenue of the state" (Wealth of Nations, V.i.d.18). Finally, he outlined how the government should support the dignity of the monarch or chief magistrate, such that they are equal or above the public in fashion. He further stated that monarchs should be provided for in a greater fashion than magistrates of a republic because "we naturally expect more splendor in the court of a king than in the mansion-house of a doge". In addition, he allowed that in some specific circumstances, retaliatory tariffs may be beneficial:

The recovery of a great foreign market will generally more than compensate the transitory inconvenience of paying dearer during a short time for some sorts of goods.

However, he added that in general, a retaliatory tariff "seems a bad method of compensating the injury done to certain classes of our people, to do another injury ourselves, not only to those classes, but to almost all the other classes of them".

Economic historians such as Jacob Viner regard Smith as a strong advocate of free markets and limited government (what Smith called "natural liberty"), but not as a dogmatic supporter of laissez-faire.

The economist Daniel Klein believes using the term "free-market economics" or "free-market economist" to identify the ideas of Smith is too general and slightly misleading. Klein offers six characteristics central to the identity of Smith's economic thought and argues that a new name is needed to give a more accurate depiction of the "Smithian" identity. The economist David Ricardo set straight some of the misunderstandings about Smith's thoughts on free market. Many continue to fall victim to the thinking that Smith was a free-market economist without exception, though he was not. Ricardo pointed out that Smith was in support of helping infant industries. Smith believed that the government should subsidise newly formed industry, but he did fear that when the infant industry grew into adulthood, it would be unwilling to surrender the government help. Smith also supported tariffs on imported goods to counteract an internal tax on the same good. Smith also fell to pressure in supporting some tariffs in support for national defence.

Some have also argued, Emma Rothschild among them, that Smith would have supported a minimum wage, although no direct textual evidence supports the claim. Smith wrote:

The price of labour, it must be observed, cannot be ascertained very accurately anywhere, different prices being often paid at the same place and for the same sort of labour, not only according to the different abilities of the workmen, but according to the easiness or hardness of the masters. Where wages are not regulated by law, all that we can pretend to determine is what are the most usual; and experience seems to show that law can never regulate them properly, though it has often pretended to do so. (The Wealth of Nations, Book 1, Chapter 8)

However, Smith also noted, to the contrary, the existence of an imbalanced inequality of bargaining power:

A landlord, a farmer, a master manufacturer, a merchant, though they did not employ a single workman, could generally live a year or two upon the stocks which they have already acquired. Many workmen could not subsist a week, few could subsist a month, and scarce any a year without employment. In the long run, the workman may be as necessary to his master as his master is to him, but the necessity is not so immediate.

== Further Information ==
One of Glasgow University's buildings has been named in his honour; costing £86 million, it is intended for graduate students.

On International Women's Day, 2000, a women's group from the University's Student Representative Council symbolically renamed the building after Frances McPhun.

== See also ==
- Critique of political economy
- Organizational capital
- List of abolitionist forerunners
- List of Fellows of the Royal Society of Arts
- People on Scottish banknotes
- Adam Smith's America
- Anne Robert Jacques Turgot

Academic offices
Preceded by Robert Cunninghame Graham of Gartmore	Rector of the University of Glasgow; 1787–1789	Succeeded by Walter Campbell of Shawfield
