= John Rae (biographer) =

Scottish journalist and biographer (1845–1915)

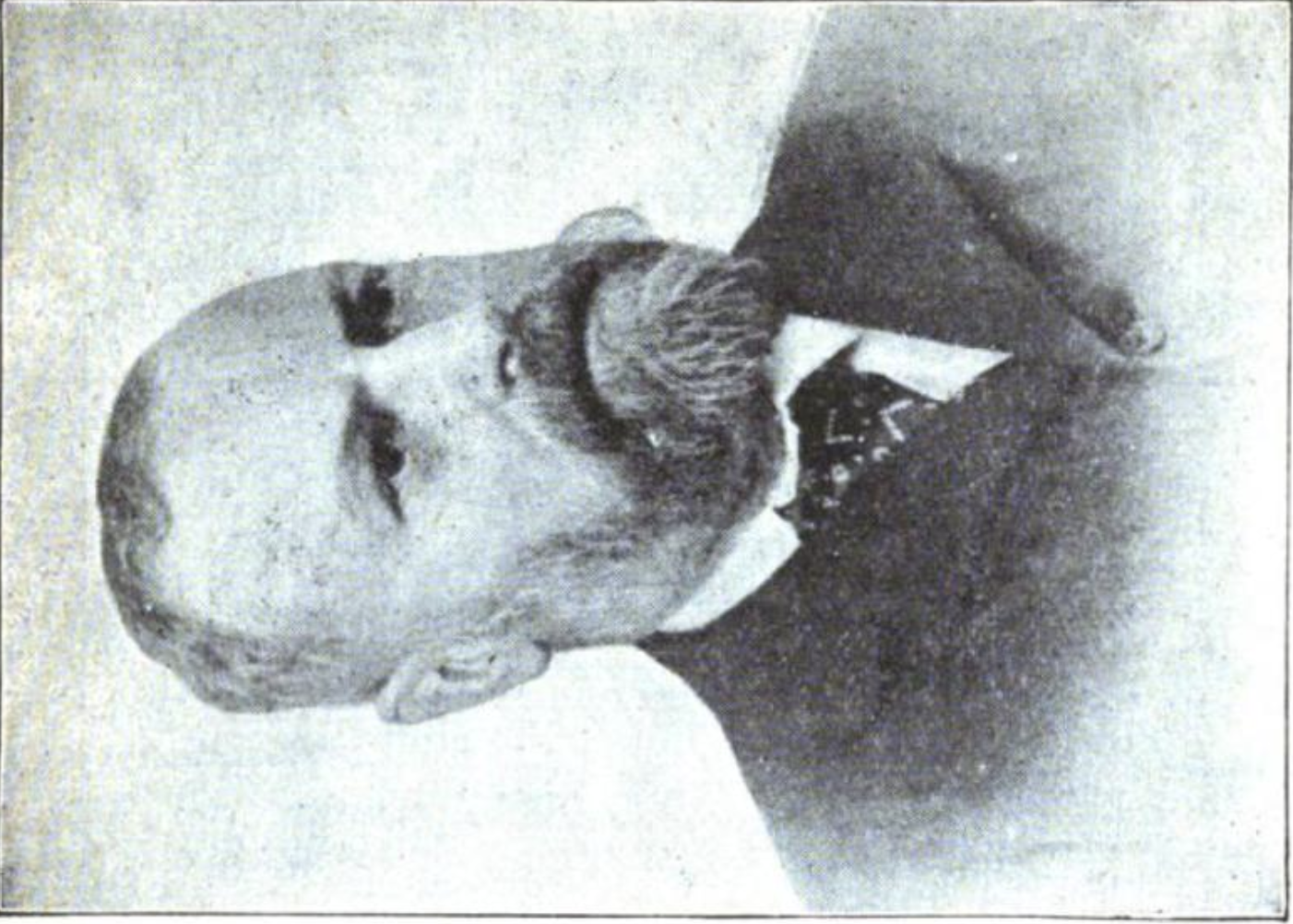
Rae in 1901

John Rae (1845 – 1915) was a Scottish journalist and biographer. The long-time editor of The Contemporary Review, and contributor to The British Quarterly Review, he became famous for his 1895 biography of Adam Smith, Life of Adam Smith, which replaced the Biographical Memoir of Adam Smith of 1811, by Dugald Stewart, as the standard Smith reference.

== Bibliography ==
- Contemporary Socialism (1884; and new editions 1891, 1901, 1908)
- 'The Eight Hours Day in Victoria' (1891), in: The Economic Journal (EJ), Vol. 1, pp. 15–42 (in Wikisource)
- Eight Hours for Work (1894)
- Life of Adam Smith (1895)
