= Lectures on Jurisprudence =

Lectures on Jurisprudence, also called Lectures on Justice, Police, Revenue and Arms (1763), is a collection of Adam Smith's lectures, comprising notes taken from his early lectures. It contains the formative ideas behind The Wealth of Nations.

== Background ==
Published as part of the 1976 Glasgow Edition of the works and correspondence of Adam Smith. It consists of two sets of lecture notes that were apparently taken from Smith's lectures of the 1760s, along with an 'Early Draft' of The Wealth of Nations. The same material had also appeared as An Early Draft of Part of The Wealth of Nations and as Lectures on Justice, Police, Revenue and Arms.

== Summary ==
Smith's Lectures on Jurisprudence, originally delivered at the University of Glasgow in 1762–1763, present his 'theory of the rules by which civil government ought to be directed'. The chief purpose of government, according to Smith, is to preserve justice; and 'the object of justice is security from injury'. The state must protect the individual's right to his person, property, reputation, and social relations. Smith elsewhere specifically defines the term jurisprudence as "the theory of general principles of law and government". It is also defined as the general guidelines about the essence of a nation's laws. In the lectures, Smith contends that every system of law aims for, and thus jurisprudence can be divided into, "the maintenance of justice, the provision of police to promote opulence, the raising of revenue, and the establishment of arms for the defence of the state".

=== Part I: Of Justice ===
- Division I. Of Public Jurisprudence
  - § 1. Of the Original Principles of Government.
  - § 2. Of the Nature of Government and its Progress in the first Ages of Society.
  - § 3. How Republican Governments were Introduced.
  - § 4. How Liberty was Lost.
  - § 5. Of Military Monarchy.
  - § 6. How Military Monarchy was Dissolved.
  - § 7. Of the Allodial Government.
  - § 8. Of the Feudal System.
  - § 9. Of the English Parliament.
  - § 10. How the Government of England became Absolute.
  - § 11. How Liberty was Restored.
  - § 12. Of the English Courts of Justice.
  - § 13. Of the little Republics in Europe.
  - § 14. Of the Rights of Sovereigns.
  - § 15. Of Citizenship.
  - § 16. Of the Rights of Subjects.
- Division II. Domestic Law
  - § 1. Husband and Wife.
  - § 2. Parent and Child.
  - § 3. Master and Servant.
  - § 4. Guardian and Ward.
  - § 5. Domestic Offences and their Punishments.
- Division III. Private Law
  - § 1. First way of acquiring Property: Occupation.
  - § 2. Second way of acquiring Property: Accession.
  - § 3. Third way of acquiring Property: Prescription.
  - § 4. Fourth way of acquiring Property: Succession.
  - § 5. Fifth way of acquiring Property: Voluntary Transference.
  - § 6. Of Servitudes.
  - § 7. Of Pledges and Mortgages.
  - § 8. Of Exclusive Privileges.
  - § 9. Of Personal Rights: Contract.
  - § 10. Of Quasi-Contract.
  - § 11. Of Delinquency.

=== Part II: Of Police ===
The pros and cons of money, prices, and financial exchanges fall under this section of the Lectures, "since the regulation of prices and the creation of money by the state both came under the head of police."

- Division I. Cleanliness and Security
- Division II. Cheapness or Plenty
  - § 1. of the Natural Wants of Mankind.
  - § 2. That all the Arts are subservient to the Natural Wants of Mankind.
  - § 3. That Opulence arises from the Division of Labour.
  - § 4. How the Division of Labour multiplies the Product.
  - § 5. What gives Occasion to the Division of Labour.
  - § 6. That the Division of Labour must be proportioned to the Extent of Commerce.
  - § 7. What Circumstances Regulate the Price of Commodities.
  - § 8. Of Money as a Measure of Value and Medium of Exchange.
  - § 9. That National Opulence does not consist in Money.
  - § 10. Of Prohibiting the Exportation of Coin.
  - § 11. Of the Balance of Trade.
  - § 12. Of the Opinion that no Expense at Home can be hurtful.
  - § 13. Of the Scheme of Mr. Law.
  - § 14. Of Interest.
  - § 15. Of Exchange.
  - § 16. Of the Causes of the slow Progress of Opulence.

=== Part III: Of Revenue ===
- § Introduction
- § 1. Of Taxes of Possessions.
- § 2. Of Taxes on Consumptions.
- § 3. Of Stocks.
- § 4. Of Stock-jobbing.

=== Part II: Of Police (resumed) ===
- § 17. Of the Influence of Commerce on Manners.

=== Part IV: Of Arms ===
- § 1. Of Militias.
- § 2. Of Discipline.
- § 3. Of Standing Armies.

=== Part V: Of the Laws of Nations ===
- Introduction
- § 1. When is War Lawful?
- § 2. What is Lawful in War?
- § 3. Of the Rights of Neutral Nations.
- § 4. Of the Rights of Ambassadors.

== Scholarly critique ==
According to William Caldwell, the lectures accomplish three goals: they detail Smith's philosophy and beliefs about economics, and they explain his motivation for writing about the historical origins of political societies. They show the influence of mercantilism and Francis Hutcheson on Smith's thoughts on the political economy. In an article for Political Science Quarterly, Wilhelm Hasbach opines that Smith believed that the political economy is the foundation for morality, law, government, wealth, revenue, and arms. This position originated from the idea of natural law. He also notes that Smith's relationship with the physiocrats is important in the Lectures and that some critics state that Smith produced the same concepts as the physiocrats on economics. Hasbach also states that Smith expands on physiocratic ideas by advocating a freedom of industry. Smith expects that industry - and also commerce - be laisser-faire and relevant to all aspects of political economics. Another scholar, C. F. Bastable, notes that Smith recognizes the need for industry for the production of wealth. Industry creates capital, which is much needed in an economically viable society.

Hasbach has also written that the Lectures offer a perspective of Smith's view on property that differs from that of John Locke. Smith believes that property does not lie within the individual but rather that it ought to be shared within society. "The individual and his labor are in no respect the ultimate source of the right of property in land: the origin of this right is in society." Also, according to Hasbach, Smith rejects a state of nature and the doctrine on an original contract, two ideas supported by Locke.
