= Panmure House (Edinburgh) =

17th-century townhouse in Edinburgh, Scotland

Coordinates: 55°57′08″N 3°10′42″W

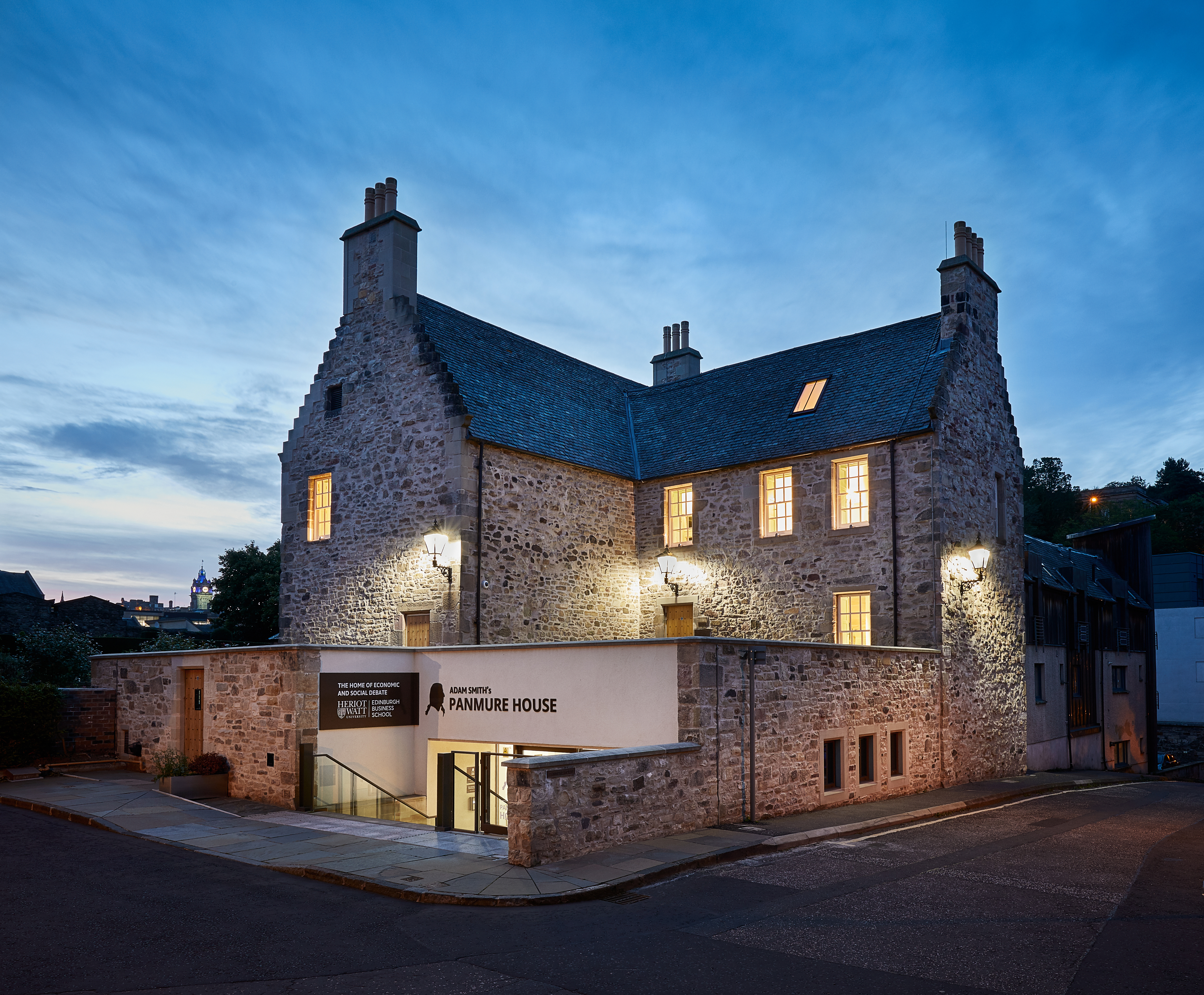
Panmure House in October 2020

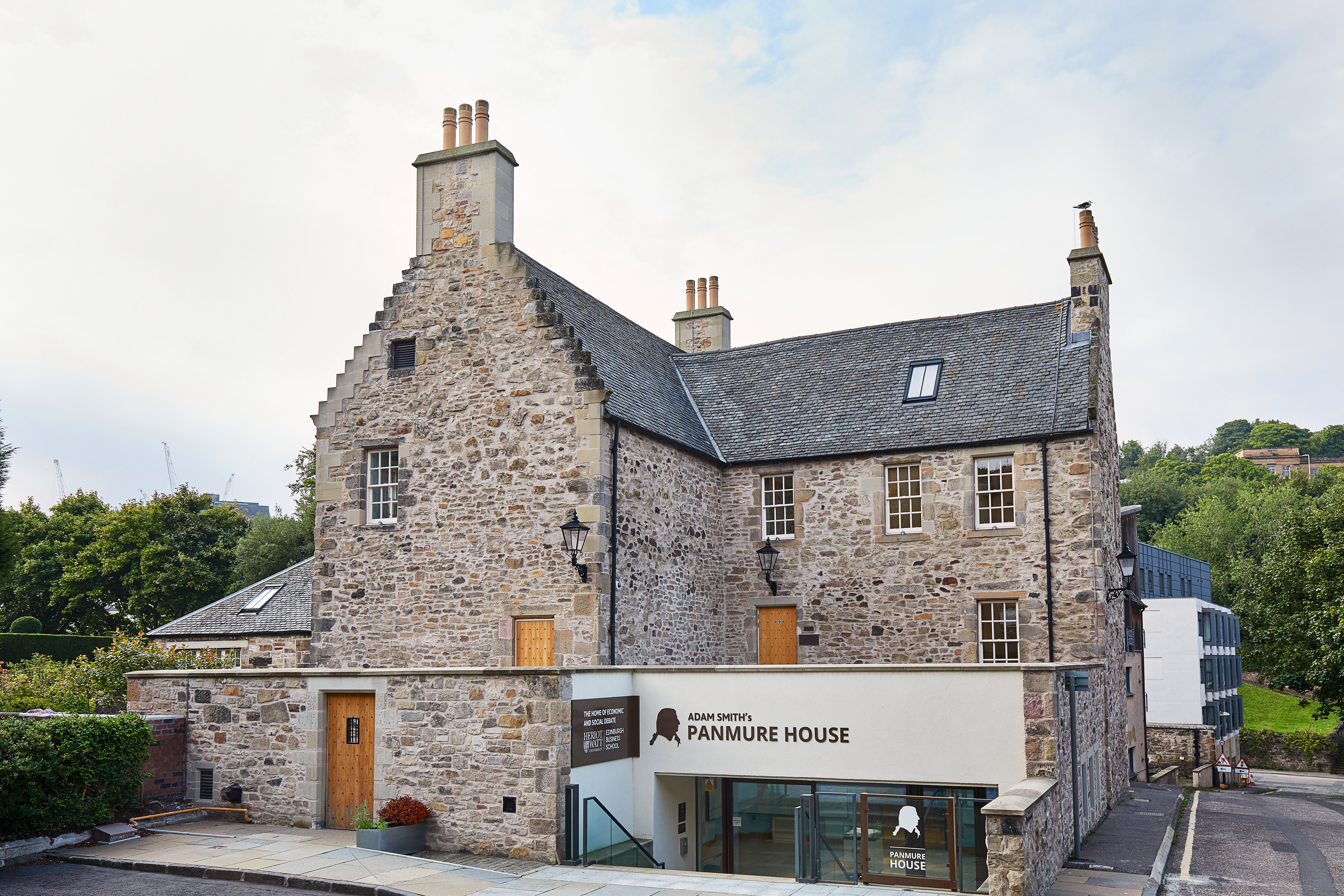
Panmure House, Edinburgh, August 2020

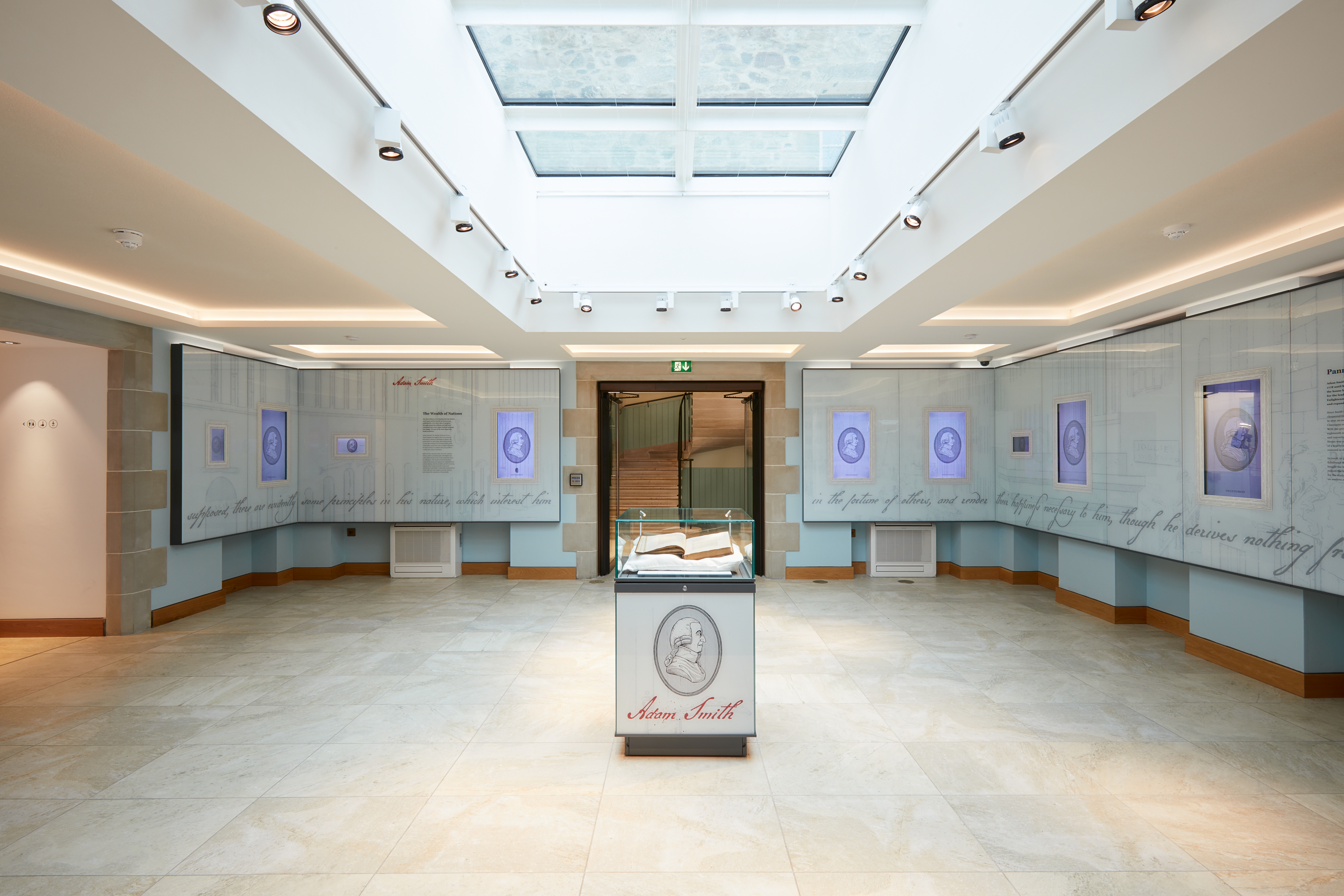
Panmure House Interpretation Suite

Panmure House is a 17th-century townhouse located in Edinburgh's Canongate. It is the only surviving residence of renowned Scottish philosopher Adam Smith, who lived there between 1778 and 1790. Situated close to the Scottish Parliament, in the heart of a UNESCO World Heritage Site, the House is an important monument of Scottish intellectual history. During his time living at Panmure House, Smith continued to study and write, producing four new editions of his magnum opus The Wealth of Nations between 1778 and 1789. He was still at work on the final edition of his 1759 master work, The Theory of Moral Sentiments, when he died at Panmure House in 1790. The House is now a centre for economic and social research and debate in Smith’s name, managed by Heriot-Watt University.

== History and restoration ==
Panmure House was originally built in 1691-3 for Lt. Col. George Murray and subsequently owned by the Earl of Panmure. It was the residence of Adam Smith from 1778 to 1790. After falling into disrepair, it was restored in the 1950s and used as a boys' club and then as a social services day centre.

Since 1970, the house has been protected by Historic Environment Scotland as a Category A listed building.

In 2008, it was bought by the Edinburgh Business School at Heriot-Watt University who commissioned its restoration as a centre of economic and social research and debate.

The House was in a state of disrepair when it was purchased due to several years of neglect. Restoration work was carried out on the exterior and interior of the House. The exterior work included rebuilding the tall chimney stacks, re-slating the roofs, repairing the stone walls and renewing the windows. The renovations also included digging out the original basement to create a contemporary extension to the building which now houses a modern Interpretation Suite where visitors can learn more about the House, Smith, and the Scottish Enlightenment before continuing into the rest of the building. Investigations carried out by local archaeologists during the restoration uncovered a well and several medieval kilns.

Work inside the house concentrated on reconstructing interiors typical of the late 1700s, using materials and techniques that were used in Smith's time. The interiors feature North American tulipwood timber panelling. A new stone staircase was added. The interior reflects a sophisticated blend between modern and period which has created a unique space consisting of a modern building with steelwork, concrete, digital screens and cabling all exquisitely concealed behind paneling, architraves and skirtings. The renovation also added new stone fireplaces, oak floors and lime plasterwork. The original roof timbers have been preserved in the attic and carry the original joiners' marks on them, numbering the trusses in Roman numerals.

The restoration was completed in mid-2018, ahead of the official opening by former British Prime Minister, Gordon Brown, in November 2018.

== Notable visitors ==
During Smith’s tenure, Panmure House was a lively hub of discourse and debate. Key figures of the Scottish Enlightenment were regular visitors. Distinguished names welcomed at the House included James Hutton, founder of modern geology; Joseph Black, founding father of chemistry; Robert Adam, the neoclassical architect; William Robertson, Edinburgh University principal and historian; Hugh Blair, Professor of Rhetoric; Samual Rogers, English poet; and Dugald Stewart, philosopher, mathematician, and Smith’s first biographer.

== Modern Day use ==
=== Adam Smith Lecture Series ===
A high-calibre lecture series bringing the world's best economic thinkers, practitioners and Nobel Laureates to the birthplace of modern economics to deliver original keynote lectures of global relevance. The inaugural lecture was presented by Andy Haldane, then Chief Economist of the Bank of England. In 2021, the lecture was delivered by Professor Sir Angus Deaton, Senior Scholar and Professor Emeritus at Princeton University.

=== Lights of Caledonia ===
A series of events designed to celebrate Scotland's intellectual and cultural contributions to the world, aptly delivered from the final home of Adam Smith. The inaugural lecture was delivered in January 2020 by Andrew Gilmour, Former Assistant Secretary-General in Human Rights, on ‘A Scots View from the UN’.

=== The Hutton Series on Climate Change ===
A series named after James Hutton, the father of modern geology - executor of Smith's will and a frequent visitor to Panmure House. The Hutton Series on Climate Change was a series of events that ran between 2020 and 2021 at Panmure House, bringing together a diverse cross-section of experts, business leaders, scientists, and concerned citizens in the service of one aim: to identify ten key priorities, innovations & actions to mitigate climate crisis.

=== Fringe at Panmure ===
Panmure House is Venue 305 at the Edinburgh Fringe Festival, hosting shows focused on economics, finance, current affairs, influential figures, and the life and works of Adam Smith. Past shows include The Butcher, The Brewer, The Baker... and the Commentator - an economics panel debate show fronted by MoneyWeek Editor-in-Chief Merryn Somerset Webb, which revived Smith's tradition of enlightened debate at Panmure for the 21st century. The House has also hosted a professionally-acted play entitled Adam Smith: The Invisible Hand. Written by Kirkcaldy playwright John Yule, the play explores what might happen if Smith's lost papers were recovered in the modern day. This dramatisation of Smith's life and works, performed in his own drawing room at Panmure, presented Jean Jacques Rousseau, Voltaire, Robert Burns, and Smith's mother Margaret, taking the audience on a journey through the Scottish Enlightenment.

=== Panmure House Prize ===
The Panmure House Prize is an annual award of $75,000 for research into long-term investing and its relationship with innovation. The Prize is awarded to emerging leaders in academia who are planning to produce outstanding research on the topic of the long-term funding of innovation in the spirit of Adam Smith. The opportunity is open to academics in economics and finance whose entries are shortlisted and judged by the Panmure House Prize Panel.

The 2021 Prize was awarded to Professor Rachelle C. Sampson from the University of Maryland.

=== Smith Schools' Series ===
Panmure House facilitates and delivers the Smith Schools’ Series, a bespoke package designed to inspire and educate school pupils about the life, work and times of Adam Smith, as well as the profound influence of the Scottish Enlightenment across the world. The Series is designed with debating skills development and critical thinking as key objectives.
