= Adam Smith's America =

2022 book by Glory M. Liu

Adam Smith’s America: How a Scottish Philosopher Became an Icon of American Capitalism
- Author: Glory M. Liu
- Language: English
- Genre: Nonfiction
- Publication date: November 29, 2022
- Pages: 384
- ISBN: 978-0-691-20381-2

Adam Smith’s America: How a Scottish Philosopher Became an Icon of American Capitalism is a 2022 nonfiction book written by Glory M. Liu about Scottish economist and philosopher Adam Smith.

== Critical reception ==
The Wall Street Journal wrote "The book bears the subtitle “How a Scottish Philosopher Became an Icon of American Capitalism,” but you don’t get to the bit where Smith becomes the capitalistic icon until the penultimate chapter. What lies in the middle is basically a history of Adam Smith’s reception in Europe and America. As a work of history the book has its virtues."
