= James Otteson =

American philosopher (born 1968)

James R. Otteson
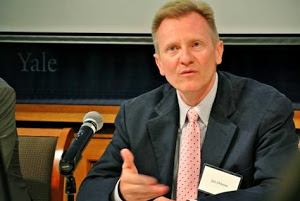
- Otteson at Yale University, July 2013
- Born: June 19, 1968 (age 58); Albuquerque, New Mexico, U.S.

Education
- Education: University of Notre Dame; University of Chicago

Philosophical work
- Era: Contemporary philosophy
- Region: Western philosophy
- School: Analytic philosophy
- Main interests: Political philosophy; Scottish Enlightenment; classical liberalism; political economy; history of economic thought; Adam Smith; business ethics

James R. Otteson (/ˈɑːtɪsən/; born June 19, 1968) is an American philosopher and political economist. He is the John T. Ryan Jr. Professor of Business Ethics at the University of Notre Dame. Formerly, he was the Thomas W. Smith Presidential Chair in Business Ethics, Professor of Economics, and executive director of the Eudaimonia Institute at Wake Forest University. He is also a Senior Scholar at The Fund for American Studies in Washington, D.C., a Research Professor in the Center for the Philosophy of Freedom and in the Philosophy Department at the University of Arizona, a Visitor of Ralston College, a Research Fellow for the Independent Institute in California, a director of Ethics and Economics Education of New England, and a Senior Scholar at the Fraser Institute. He has taught previously at Yeshiva University, New York University, Georgetown University, and the University of Alabama.

== Academic biography ==
Otteson earned his Bachelor of Arts degree from the Program of Liberal Studies—the "Great Books Program"—at the University of Notre Dame. His senior essay, "The Therapeutic Philosophy of Ludwig Wittgenstein," won PLS's Otto A. Bird Award for best senior essay in 1990. He spent his sophomore year abroad, studying at the Universität Innsbruck, in Innsbruck, Austria.

After completing his undergraduate degree, Otteson then attended the University of Wisconsin–Milwaukee, earning an MA in philosophy in 1992. His paper "A Problem in Wittgeinstein's Philosophy of Language" won the department's 1991 Richard M. Peltz Memorial Award for Excellence in Philosophy. His master's thesis, "Locke's Arguments for the Existence of Natural Law," was directed by William Wainwright.

Otteson then joined the philosophy department at the University of Chicago, receiving a PhD in 1997. His dissertation, "The Unintended Order of Morality: Adam Smith and David Hume on the Origins of Morality," was directed by Daniel Garber (now at Princeton University), with readers Ted Cohen and Ian Mueller. Knud Haakonssen (then at Boston University; now at the University of St. Andrews and University College London) was an outside reader.

Upon graduating from Chicago, Otteson took a position in the philosophy department at the University of Alabama, where he began as an assistant professor and rose to become associate professor, full professor, and department chair. In 2007, he accepted a position as joint professor of philosophy and economics, and director of the honors program, at Yeshiva University. He moved to Wake Forest University in 2013, and was the director of the Eudaimonia Institute.

He has held visiting scholar positions at the Social Philosophy and Policy Center, then located at Bowling Green State University; at the Centre for the Study of Scottish Philosophy, then located at the University of Aberdeen; at the Institute for Advanced Studies in Humanities at the University of Edinburgh; in the economics and philosophy departments at the University of Missouri-St. Louis; and in the government department at Georgetown University. He has also taught in the economics department at New York University.

Otteson lectures widely on Adam Smith, classical liberalism, political economy, business ethics, and related issues, including in Canada, Chile, China, Germany, Guatemala, Hong Kong, and Scotland.

== Scholarship ==
Otteson first became known for his writings on the ethics of Adam Smith. In his book, Adam Smith's Marketplace of Life (Cambridge University Press, 2002), he argued that Smith's moral philosophy proposed a "marketplace model" for the creation, development, and maintenance of large-scale human social orders, including morality. He also argues that this "market model" unifies Smith's two books, his 1759 Theory of Moral Sentiments and his 1776 Inquiry into the Nature and Causes of the Wealth of Nations, thereby providing a resolution to the long-standing "Adam Smith Problem."

In 2005, Otteson won a prize from the Fund for the Study of Spontaneous Order, sponsored by the Atlas Economic Research Foundation. This award is for scholars working outside the traditional areas of economics whose work is informed by an Austrian economic perspective.

Otteson's book Actual Ethics (Cambridge University Press, 2006) was named the first-prize winner of the 2007 Templeton Enterprise Award, an award sponsored by the Templeton Foundation and administered by the Intercollegiate Studies Institute. The award goes to "the very best that has been written ... to advance the cause of ordered liberty around the world" by an author under the age of forty, and it carried with it a $50,000 cash prize, more than what accompanies a Pulitzer Prize or a National Book Award.

Actual Ethics defends a classical liberal political order, based on a fusion of Kantian and Aristotelian moral themes. After developing and defending the moral basis of the position, he goes on to show how a classical liberal state would address several vexing moral and political issues, including wealth and poverty, affirmative action, same-sex marriage and adoption, speech codes, public education, and the treatment of animals. He also develops a eudaimonist conception of human happiness, drawing on broadly Aristotelian themes.

His most recent books are the edited collection What Adam Smith Knew and the manuscript The End of Socialism, which was published by Cambridge University Press in 2014. In his review of The End of Socialism, Bradley Birzer called the book "one of the best books written on political thought and the philosophy of classical liberalism since Friedrich Hayek's The Constitution of Liberty." James Bruce claims that the book's "moral critique of socialism" is "so important, and so powerful." And Loren Lomasky writes, "The End of Socialism is erudite, exceedingly well informed, and some 800 percent more massive than the forerunner [i.e., G. A. Cohen's Why Not Socialism?] that it far exceeds in argumentative power.

Otteson's books include The Essential Adam Smith, published in 2018 by The Fraser Institute, and Honorable Business: A Framework for Business in a Just and Humane Society, published in 2019 by Oxford University Press.

== Publications ==
=== Books ===
- Adam Smith's Marketplace of Life. New York: Cambridge University Press, 2002.
- The Levellers: Overton, Walwyn, and Lilburne, 5 vols. (ed.). Bristol: Thoemmes Press, 2003.
- Adam Smith: Selected Philosophical Writings (ed.). Exeter: Imprint Academic, 2004.
- Actual Ethics. New York: Cambridge University Press, 2006.
- Adam Smith. London: Bloomsbury, 2013.
- The End of Socialism. New York: Cambridge University Press, 2014.
- What Adam Smith Knew (ed.). New York: Encounter, 2014.

=== Selected articles and essays ===
- "The Recurring 'Adam Smith Problem.'" History of Philosophy Quarterly 17, 1 (January 2000): 51–74.
- "Freedom of Religion and Public Schooling." The Independent Review 4, 4 (Spring 2000): 601–13.
- "Limits on Our Obligation to Give." Public Affairs Quarterly 14, 3 (July 2000): 183–203.
- "Adam Smith's First Market: The Development of Language." History of Philosophy Quarterly 19, 1 (January 2002): 65–86.
- "Adam Smith's Marketplace of Morals." Archiv für Geschichte der Philosophie 84, 2 (September 2002): 190–211.
- "Private Judgment, Individual Liberty, and the Role of the State." Journal of Social Philosophy 33, 3 (Fall 2002): 491–511.
- "Shaftesbury's Evolutionary Morality and Its Influence on Adam Smith." Adam Smith Review 4 (2008): 106–31.
- "Kantian Individualism and Political Libertarianism." The Independent Review 13, 3 (Winter 2009): 389–409.
- "Adam Smith and the Great Mind Fallacy." Social Philosophy and Policy 27, 1 (Winter 2010): 276–304.
- "The Inhuman Alienation of Capitalism." Society 49, 2 (2012): 139–43.
- "An Audacious Promise: The Moral Case for Capitalism." The Manhattan Institute's Issues 2012, no. 12.
- "Adam Smith on Justice, Social Justice, and Ultimate Justice." Social Philosophy and Policy 34, 1 (2016): 123–43.
- "The Misuse of Egalitarianism in Society." The Independent Review 22, 1 (Summer 2017): 37–47.

=== Selected chapters ===
- "Unintended-Order Explanations in Adam Smith and the Scottish Enlightenment." In Liberalism, Conservatism, and Hayek's Idea of Spontaneous Order, eds. Louis Hunt and Peter McNamara. New York: Palgrave Macmillan, 2007.
- "Editor's Introduction." Journal of Scottish Philosophy 7, 1 (March 2009), a special edition of JSP on "The Scottish Enlightenment and Social Thought" edited by Otteson.
- "The Scottish Enlightenment and the Tragedy of Human Happiness." In On Happiness, ed. Kelly James Clark. Beijing, China: The World Knowledge Press, 2010.
- "How High Does the Impartial Spectator Go?" In Adam Smith as Theologian, ed. Paul Oslington. New York: Routledge, 2011.
- "Adam Smith." In the Oxford Handbook of the History of Ethics, ed. Roger Crisp. New York: Oxford University Press, 2013.
- "Adam Smith on Virtue, Prosperity, and Justice," in Economics and the Virtues: Building a New Moral Foundation, Jennifer A. Baker and Mark D. White, eds. (New York: Oxford University Press, 2016): 72–93.
- "Adam Smith and the Right," in Adam Smith: His Life, Thought, and Legacy, Ryan Patrick Hanley, ed. (Princeton: Princeton University Press, 2016): 494–511.
- "Adam Smith's Libertarian Paternalism." In the Oxford Handbook of Freedom, eds. David Schmidtz and Carmen Pavel. New York: Oxford University Press, published online in 2016.

=== Selected book reviews ===
- Charles Griswold's Adam Smith and the Virtues of Enlightenment. Philosophy and Phenomenological Research 61, 3 (November 2000): 714–18.
- Samuel Fleischacker's A Third Concept of Liberty. The Review of Metaphysics 52, 2 (December 2000): 426–8.
- J.C. Lester's Escape from Leviathan. The Independent Review 6, 1 (Summer 2001): 129–32.
- Gordon Graham's The Case Against the Democratic State. The Independent Review 9, 1 (Summer 2004).
- Leonidas Montes's Adam Smith in Context. Journal of Scottish Philosophy 3, 1 (March 2005): 98-102.
- Samuel Fleischacker's On Adam Smith's Wealth of Nations: A Philosophical Companion. Mind 116 (January 2007): 161–5.
- Deirdre McCloskey's The Bourgeois Virtues. Azure 31 (Winter 5768/2008): 120–4.
- D. D. Raphael's The Impartial Spectator. Journal of the History of Philosophy 46, 2 (April 2008): 325–7.
- Craig Smith's Adam Smith's Political Philosophy. The Adam Smith Review 4 (2008).
- Garrett Cullity's The Moral Demands of Affluence. Journal of Value Inquiry (6 November 2010).
- G. A. Cohen's Why Not Socialism? The Independent Review 15, 3 (Winter 2011): 466–70.
- Alexander Broadie's History of Scottish Philosophy. Journal of Scottish Philosophy 9, 2 (September 2011): 244–9.
- David Rose's The Moral Foundation of Economics. The Independent Review 17, 2 (Fall 2012): 297–300.
- Charles Griswold's Jean-Jacques Rousseau and Adam Smith: A Philosophical Encounter. Notre Dame Philosophical Reviews, 2018.03.08.

== Other work ==
In 2010-'12, Otteson appeared several times on Andrew Napolitano's one-time Fox Business News television program, "Freedom Watch." He has also appeared in several short videos for Learn Liberty, all of which are available here.

Otteson was one of the principal bloggers at Pileus, and he is a member of the Mont Pelerin Society.

In November 2013, Otteson gave the inaugural Liggio Lecture, an annual lecture series in honor of Leonard Liggio.

In 2014-'15, Otteson was a bimonthly columnist for the Triad Business Journal.

Otteson serves as an associate editor of The Independent Review and as a senior editor of Political Economy of the Carolinas.

== See also ==
- American philosophy
- List of American philosophers
