= Essays on Philosophical Subjects =

Work by Adam Smith

Essays on Philosophical Subjects is a history of astronomy written by Scottish economist Adam Smith which contains some of his thoughts on ancient physics and metaphysics.

This work was published posthumously (after death) in 1795 using material which Smith had intended to publish, but had not prepared at the time of his death in 1790. This was done by his literary executors, two old friends from the Scottish academic world: physicist/chemist Joseph Black and pioneering geologist James Hutton. A brief account of their work appears in a section entitled 'Advertisement by the Editors'.

== Works ==
The book consists of these distinct works:

- The History of Astronomy
- The History of the Ancient Physics
- The History of the Ancient Logics and Metaphysics
- Of the External Senses
- Of the Nature of that Imitation which takes place in what are called The Imitative Arts

=== History of Astronomy ===
The History of Astronomy is the largest of these and is thought to have been written in the 1750s, before Smith's major works. The Glasgow Edition of 1976 includes some detailed criticism of his use of sources and defends him for calling Newton a philosopher rather than a scientist; the word 'scientist' did not exist before 1839.

The History of Astronomy is divided into four sections.

- Section I: "Of the effect of Unexpectedness, or of Surprise". (§1-10)
- Section II: "Of wonder, or of Effects of Novelty". (§1-12)
- Section III: "Of the Origin of Philosophy". (§1-7) Here, Smith defines philosophy as a rational explication of the world.
- Section IV: "The History of Astronomy". (§1-76) Smith outlines the history of modern astrometric systems. He discusses Copernican, Galilean, Keplerian, Cartesian, and Newtonian systems. Modern astronomy is no longer mathematical, but of the physical order. According to Smith, if a system is simpler and more efficient in its explanations, then it is more likely to be closer to the way nature works.

It also contains Smith's first mention of the invisible hand:

For it may be observed, that in all Polytheistic religions, among savages, as well as in the early ages of heathen antiquity, it is the irregular events of nature only that are ascribed to the agency and power of the gods. Fire burns, and water refreshes; heavy bodies descend, and lighter substances fly upwards, by the necessity of their own nature; nor was the invisible hand of Jupiter ever apprehended to be employed in those matters.

=== Of the External Senses ===
"Of the External Senses" deals with each sense in turn. According to Smith, each idea is an expression of a sensory impression. He concluded the previous section entitled "The History of the Ancient Logics and Metaphysics" on the question of language. The language motif is continued.

Touching (§3-21)

Tasting (§22)

Smelling (§23)

Hearing (§24-88)

The order of passage is not insignificant. Smith affirmed that every sense (except touch) is directly linked to an organ. Usually, sight is the sense that is more mobilised.

In this part of the essay, two philosophical debates are mobilised:

- The distinction between the primary and secondary qualities.
- The Molyneux problem.
