= Edinburgh Business School =

Business school in Edinburgh Scotland

Coordinates: 55.909°N 3.321°W

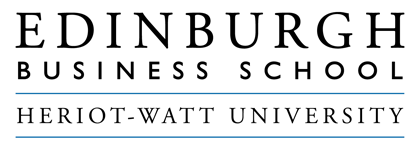
- Motto: Developing tomorrow's business leaders for tomorrow's markets
- Type: Public
- Established: 1990 (HWU est. 1821)
- Founder: Dr. Keith G. Lumsden
- Executive Dean: Professor Heather McGregor, CBE
- Location: Edinburgh, Lothians, Scotland
- Campus: Heriot-Watt University campuses: Edinburgh, Dubai and Malaysia.
- Website: www.hw.ac.uk/ebs/

Edinburgh Business School (EBS) is the Graduate School of Business of Heriot-Watt University (est. 1821), Edinburgh, Scotland. Heriot-Watt University awards degrees by royal charter. Heriot-Watt University was featured in the Academic Ranking of World Universities Top 200 to study Finance and in the QS World University Rankings Top 200 to study Statistics & Operational Research. There are currently over 11,850 active students studying Edinburgh Business School programmes and more than 19,200 graduates across 165 countries worldwide.

== Programmes ==
The School offers a range of postgraduate programmes including a Master of Business Administration (MBA) programme, one of the largest international programmes of its kind in the world. The MBA is offered on-campus in Edinburgh, Dubai and Malaysia, through a network of 23 Approved Learning Partners across the world, by independent distance learning or through a combination of these routes. Each subject is assessed by a 3-hour written examination where all questions are compulsory.

All 7 core courses are available in English, Chinese and Spanish, with 3 of the elective courses available in English, Spanish and Chinese. Examinations are run in over 400 centres around the world, each April, July-August and December.

A Doctor of Business Administration (DBA) programme was introduced in 2003 and currently has 70 students pursuing their DBA research with guidance from a mentor or supervisor. Various Master of Science (MSc) degrees in a number of specialisms are also available at the School.
