= 2017–18 West of Scotland Super League =

Scottish soccer league season

The 2017–18 West of Scotland Super League was the 16th and final season of the West Super League, the top tier of league competition for SJFA West Region member clubs.

The league comprised two divisions, a West of Scotland Super League Premier Division of 12 clubs and a West of Scotland Super League First Division of 14 clubs. The competition began on Saturday 19 August 2017.

This was the final season using the format ahead of league reconstruction for the 2018–19 season. The West of Scotland Super League Premier Division was renamed the West of Scotland Premiership and expanded to 16 teams. The West of Scotland Super League First Division was renamed the West of Scotland Championship and also expanded to 16 teams.

The winners of the Super League Premier Division entered the preliminary round of the 2018–19 Scottish Cup.

== Super League Premier Division ==
McBookie.com West of Scotland Super League Premier Division
- Season: 2017–18
- Champions: Beith
- Relegated: Girvan; Arthurlie
- Matches: 132
- Goals: 465 (3.52 per match)
- Biggest home win: Beith 6–0 Girvan (2 June 2018)
- Biggest away win: Arthurlie 1–8 Beith (9 May 2018)
- Highest scoring: Arthurlie 1–8 Beith (9 May 2018); Kirkintilloch Rob Roy 3–6 Girvan (19 May 2018); Hurlford United 6–3 Clydebank (2 June 2018)
- All statistics correct as of 12 June 2018.

=== Format changes ===
There were no automatic relegation from the Premier Division to the new Championship, however the bottom two entered the West Region Play-offs for a place in the new Premiership.

=== Member clubs for the 2017–18 season ===
Glenafton Athletic were the reigning champions.

Clydebank and Girvan were promoted from the Super League First Division, replacing the automatically relegated Troon and Largs Thistle.

Kilwinning Rangers claimed the final spot after defeating Kilsyth Rangers 3–2 on aggregate in the West Region League play-off.

Club	Location	Ground	Manager	Finishing position 2016–17
Arthurlie	Barrhead	Dunterlie Park	Billy Ogilvie	7th
Auchinleck Talbot	Auchinleck	Beechwood Park	Tommy Sloan	4th
Beith	Beith	Bellsdale Park	John Millar	3rd
Clydebank	Clydebank	Holm Park	Kieran McAnespie	Super League First Division, 2nd
Cumnock	Cumnock	Townhead Park	Peter Leonard	6th
Girvan	Girvan	Hamilton Park	Lawrie Dinwoodie (interim)	Super League First Division, 1st
Glenafton Athletic	New Cumnock	Loch Park	Craig McEwan	Champions
Hurlford United	Hurlford	Blair Park	Darren Henderson	5th
Kilbirnie Ladeside	Kilbirnie	Valefield Park	Billy McGhie	9th
Kilwinning Rangers	Kilwinning	Abbey Park	Chris Strain	10th
Kirkintilloch Rob Roy	Cumbernauld	Guy's Meadow^{1}	Stuart Maxwell	2nd
Pollok	Newlands, Glasgow	Newlandsfield Park	Tony McInally	8th

^{1} Groundsharing with Cumbernauld United.

=== Managerial changes ===
Club	Outgoing manager	Manner of departure	Date of vacancy	Position in table	Incoming manager	Date of appointment
Kilbirnie Ladeside	Mark Bradley	Released	20 May 2017	Preseason	Billy McGhie	20 May 2017
Cumnock Juniors	John McKeown	Resigned	7 October 2017	12th	Peter Leonard	13 October 2017
Girvan	Peter Leonard	Appointed manager at Cumnock Juniors	13 October 2017	9th	Lawrie Dinwoodie	15 October 2017
Arthurlie	Chris Mackie	Resigned	21 October 2017	10th	Billy Ogilvie	29 October 2017

=== League table ===
Pos	Team	Pld	W	D	L	GF	GA	GD	Pts	Qualification or relegation
1	Beith (C)	22	14	3	5	61	21	+40	45	Qualification to 2018–19 Scottish Cup
2	Auchinleck Talbot	22	14	2	6	56	25	+31	44	
3	Pollok	22	11	7	4	46	27	+19	40	
4	Kilwinning Rangers	22	12	4	6	43	29	+14	40	
5	Kilbirnie Ladeside	22	9	7	6	35	37	−2	34	
6	Kirkintilloch Rob Roy	22	9	4	9	45	53	−8	31	
7	Glenafton Athletic	22	8	6	8	30	30	0	30	
8	Hurlford United	22	8	5	9	37	36	+1	29	
9	Cumnock	22	7	6	9	36	40	−4	27	
10	Clydebank	22	7	3	12	22	44	−22	24	
11	Girvan (R)	22	2	6	14	24	59	−35	12	Qualification to West Region League play-offs
12	Arthurlie (R)	22	2	5	15	20	64	−44	11	Qualification to West Region League play-offs

Source: SJFA
Rules for classification: 1) Points; 2) Goal difference; 3) Goals scored
(C) Champions; (R) Relegated

=== Results ===
Home \ Away	ART	AUC	BEI	CLY	CMN	GRV	GLE	HUR	KLB	KWN	KRR	PLK
Arthurlie		0–5	1–8	2–0	0–0	1–1	1–1	0–3	0–3	1–4	4–3	0–1
Auchinleck Talbot	4–0		2–2	5–0	3–2	3–0	2–1	4–1	5–0	0–1	4–1	1–2
Beith Juniors	4–1	2–0		2–0	3–1	6–0	5–0	3–0	2–3	2–1	0–1	2–3
Clydebank	0–0	3–1	1–2		2–0	2–2	2–1	3–0	1–0	2–3	3–1	0–1
Cumnock Juniors	4–0	2–2	0–6	5–2		3–1	3–1	1–1	2–2	1–3	0–1	1–0
Girvan	1–1	1–5	0–1	0–3	0–1		1–3	1–0	1–2	1–2	3–3	0–5
Glenafton Athletic	3–2	0–1	1–0	1–0	0–2	4–0		0–3	3–1	1–1	4–0	1–1
Hurlford United	4–1	1–0	0–1	6–3	3–2	4–0	0–0		4–1	1–2	1–5	3–3
Kilbirnie Ladeside	3–2	1–3	1–1	2–1	1–1	0–0	1–1	2–0		1–0	2–0	1–1
Kilwinning Rangers	4–1	0–1	2–1	4–2	4–2	5–3	1–1	0–0	2–2		1–0	1–2
Kirkintilloch Rob Roy	3–2	4–3	1–6	2–2	4–2	3–6	2–0	2–2	5–2	2–1		1–1
Pollok	5–0	1–2	2–2	4–0	1–1	2–2	1–3	2–0	2–4	2–1	4–1	

Updated to match(es) played on 12 June 2018. Source: SJFA West Region
Legend: Blue = home team win; Yellow = draw; Red = away team win.

== Super League First Division ==
McBookie.com West of Scotland Super League First Division
- Season: 2017–18
- Champions: Petershill
- Relegated: Maryhill; Shettleston
- Matches: 182
- Goals: 647 (3.55 per match)
- Biggest home win: Petershill 6–0 Darvel (14 April 2018)
- Biggest away win: Larkhall Thistle 0–7 Troon (26 April 2018)
- Highest scoring: Darvel 4–5 Cumbernauld United (2 September 2017); Larkhall Thistle 4–5 Rutherglen Glencairn (16 September 2017); Maryhill 3–6 Cambuslang Rangers (10 February 2018); Kello Rovers 3–6 Renfrew (24 March 2018)
- All statistics correct as of 3 June 2018.

=== Format changes ===
The top four were promoted to the new Premiership with fifth and sixth entering the West Region Play-offs. There was no automatic relegation from the First Division to the new League One, however, the bottom two entered the West Region Play-offs for a place in the new Championship.

=== Member clubs for the 2017–18 season ===
Troon and Largs Thistle were relegated from the Super League Premier Division.

Darvel and Kello Rovers were promoted from the Ayrshire District League while Cambuslang Rangers and Larkhall Thistle gained promotion from the Central District First Division.

They were joined by Kilsyth Rangers who lost the West Region League play-off 3–2 on aggregate to Kilwinning Rangers.

Irvine Victoria were relegated to the Ayrshire District League and Blantyre Victoria, Shotts Bon Accord and Yoker Athletic were relegated to the Central District First Division.

Club	Location	Ground	Manager(s)	Finishing position 2016–17
Cambuslang Rangers	Cambuslang	Somervell Park	Paul McColl	Central District First Division, 1st
Cumbernauld United	Cumbernauld	Guy's Meadow	Andy Frame	9th
Darvel	Darvel	Recreation Park	Graeme Neil	Ayrshire District League, 1st
Irvine Meadow	Irvine	Meadow Park	Brian McGinty	6th
Kello Rovers	Kirkconnel	Nithside Park	John Quinn	Ayrshire District League, 2nd
Kilsyth Rangers	Kilsyth	Duncansfield Park	Chris McGroarty	3rd
Largs Thistle	Largs	Barrfields Stadium	Stuart Davidson	Super League Premier Division, 11th
Larkhall Thistle	Larkhall	Gasworks Park	Duncan Sinclair	Central District First Division, 2nd
Maryhill	Glasgow	Lochburn Park	John Hughes	10th
Petershill	Glasgow	Petershill Park	Willie Paterson	4th
Renfrew	Renfrew	New Western Park	Colin Clark and Martin Ferry	8th
Rutherglen Glencairn	Rutherglen	Celsius Stadium	Willie Harvey	5th
Shettleston	Glasgow	Greenfield Park	Hugh Kelly & Bernard Beacom	7th
Troon	Troon	Portland Park	Jim Kirkwood	Super League Premier Division, 12th

=== Managerial changes ===
Club	Outgoing manager(s)	Manner of departure	Date of vacancy	Position in table	Incoming manager	Date of appointment
Shettleston	James McKenna & Keith Doherty	Sacked	9 July 2017	Preseason	Hugh Kelly & Bernard Beacom	16 July 2017
Kilsyth Rangers	Keith Hogg	Resigned	31 July 2017	Preseason	Chris McGroarty	5 August 2017
Kello Rovers	Geoff Patterson	End of interim	3 September 2017	8th	John Quinn	3 September 2017
Irvine Meadow	Ross Wilson	Sacked	9 October 2017	9th	Brian McGinty	25 October 2017
Darvel Juniors	Scott Clelland	Sacked	7 November 2017	6th	Graeme Neil	17 November 2017

=== League table ===
Pos	Team	Pld	W	D	L	GF	GA	GD	Pts	Qualification or relegation
1	Petershill (C, P)	26	19	4	3	65	30	+35	61	Promotion to West of Scotland Premiership
2	Cambuslang Rangers (P)	26	16	2	8	62	39	+23	50	Promotion to West of Scotland Premiership
3	Largs Thistle (P)	26	15	5	6	42	27	+15	50	Promotion to West of Scotland Premiership
4	Renfrew (P)	26	15	4	7	48	36	+12	49	Promotion to West of Scotland Premiership
5	Irvine Meadow (O, P)	26	15	4	7	45	33	+12	49	Qualification to West Region League play-offs
6	Troon (O, P)	26	14	5	7	62	42	+20	47	Qualification to West Region League play-offs
7	Rutherglen Glencairn	26	13	4	9	56	46	+10	43	
8	Cumbernauld United	26	13	2	11	51	45	+6	41	
9	Darvel	26	9	4	13	48	55	−7	31	
10	Kilsyth Rangers	26	8	4	14	42	53	−11	28	
11	Larkhall Thistle	26	7	4	15	45	62	−17	25	
12	Kello Rovers	26	6	5	15	38	55	−17	23	
13	Maryhill (R)	26	2	6	18	24	62	−38	12	Qualification to West Region League play-offs
14	Shettleston (R)	26	2	3	21	19	62	−43	9	Qualification to West Region League play-offs

Source: SJFA
Rules for classification: 1) Points; 2) Goal difference; 3) Goals scored
(C) Champions; (O) Play-off winners; (P) Promoted; (R) Relegated

=== Results ===
Home \ Away	CAMB	CUM	DAR	IVM	KLO	KSY	LRG	LRK	MAR	PSH	REN	RUG	SHE	TRO
Cambuslang Rangers		2–0	2–0	4–3	3–3	2–0	0–3	4–2	5–1	0–4	4–0	2–1	5–0	1–3
Cumbernauld United	1–3		2–2	2–2	3–0	4–1	0–1	2–1	3–2	3–1	2–3	4–2	2–0	2–4
Darvel	4–0	4–5		0–0	3–1	0–3	0–2	3–1	3–1	2–3	2–0	1–2	4–3	1–2
Irvine Meadow	2–0	0–1	2–4		0–1	1–0	2–1	2–1	5–0	0–0	1–2	3–1	2–1	1–1
Kello Rovers	0–3	2–1	2–2	2–3		3–3	1–2	2–3	2–0	0–1	3–6	2–2	2–1	1–2
Kilsyth Rangers	0–4	3–1	2–3	1–3	2–1		2–2	1–1	0–2	1–3	3–2	2–1	4–0	1–1
Largs Thistle	1–0	0–3	3–3	0–1	3–1	3–0		2–1	4–0	1–1	1–1	2–0	1–0	1–4
Larkhall Thistle	0–2	2–1	3–0	1–2	3–0	3–2	0–1		2–2	2–4	0–3	4–5	1–1	0–7
Maryhill	3–6	0–2	3–1	0–1	1–1	0–3	0–1	1–2		1–2	0–0	1–2	1–1	1–7
Petershill	2–2	4–2	6–0	4–0	3–1	3–2	4–1	1–0	4–1		2–1	1–3	2–0	3–3
Renfrew	0–4	2–0	2–1	4–1	2–0	2–1	3–1	4–3	0–0	1–2		3–1	1–0	2–2
Rutherglen Glencairn	3–1	2–3	2–4	0–1	3–1	5–1	0–0	2–2	3–2	2–1	1–0		4–1	2–2
Shettleston	0–1	0–1	1–0	0–3	0–5	2–0	0–3	3–5	0–0	1–2	0–3	2–3		0–2
Troon	3–2	2–1	2–1	2–3	0–1	1–4	0–2	5–2	2–1	0–2	0–1	0–4	5–2	

Updated to match(es) played on 3 June 2018. Source: SJFA West Region
Legend: Blue = home team win; Yellow = draw; Red = away team win.

== West Region League play-offs ==
=== Premiership ===
As the teams finishing 11th and 12th in the Super League Premier Division, Girvan and Arthurie entered a play-off against the teams finishing fifth and sixth (Troon and Irvine Meadow) in the Super League First Division for the final two places in the new West Region Premiership.

==== First leg ====
6 June 2018
19:30

Irvine Meadow	2–1	Arthurlie

Meadow Park, Irvine
11 June 2018
19:30

Troon	2–1	Girvan

Portland Park, Troon

==== Second leg ====
8 June 2018
19:30

Arthurlie	0–2	Irvine Meadow

Dunterlie Park, Barrhead

Irvine Meadow won 4–1 on aggregate.

13 June 2018
19:30

Girvan	1–2	Troon

Hamilton Park, Girvan

Troon won 4–2 on aggregate.

=== Championship ===
Maryhill and Shettleston finished as the bottom two of the Super League First Division, they entered a play-off against the teams finishing fourth in the Ayrshire District League (Whitletts Victoria) and the Central District First Division (Neilston) for the final two places in the new West Region Championship.

==== First leg ====
11 June 2018
19:30

Shettleston	0–1	Neilston

Greenfield Park, Shettleston, Glasgow
11 June 2018
19:30

Maryhill	0–2	Whitletts Victoria

Lochburn Park, Maryhill, Glasgow

==== Second leg ====
13 June 2018
20:00

Whitletts Victoria	2–1	Maryhill

Dam Park, Ayr

Whitletts Victoria won 4–1 on aggregate.

13 June 2018
19:30

Neilston	1–1	Shettleston

Brig O' Lea Stadium, Neilston

Neilston won 2–1 on aggregate.
