= 2021–22 West of Scotland Football League =

West of Scotland Football League
- Season: 2021–22
- Dates: 17 July 2021 – 23 May 2022 (Note: The last league match was played on 23 May, however the final result of the Glenafton Athletic–Blantyre Victoria match (played five days earlier) was not confirmed until 27 May.)

The 2021–22 West of Scotland Football League (known as the PDM Buildbase West of Scotland League for sponsorship reasons) was the 2nd season of the West of Scotland Football League, with its top division as part of the sixth tier of the Scottish football pyramid system. The season began on 17 July 2021.

== Teams ==
=== To West of Scotland Football League ===
- BSC Glasgow
- Campbeltown Pupils
- Finnart
- Glenvale
- Harmony Row
- Kilsyth Athletic
- St. Peter's

Transferred from East Premiership South

- Harthill Royal

=== From West of Scotland Football League ===
In Abeyance

- Annbank United

== Premier Division ==
West of Scotland Football League Premier Division
- Season: 2021–22
- Dates: 17 July 2021 – 23 May 2022
- Champions: Darvel
- Relegated: Benburb; Rutherglen Glencairn; Cumbernauld United; Kilbirnie Ladeside; Rossvale; Blantyre Victoria; Bonnyton Thistle
- Matches: 380
- Goals: 1,258 (3.31 per match)
- Biggest home win: Largs Thistle 8–1 Beith Juniors (20 April 2022)
- Biggest away win: Bonnyton Thistle 1–8 Largs Thistle (5 February 2022)
- Highest scoring: 5 matches: 9 goals (Note: The matches were Darvel 7–2 Rossvale on 31 July 2021, Rossvale 2–7 Beith Juniors on 4 December 2021, Bonnyton Thistle 1–8 Largs Thistle on 5 February 2022, Largs Thistle 8–1 Beith Juniors on 20 April 2022 and Bonnyton Thistle 2–7 Beith Juniors on 23 April 2022.)
- Longest winning run: 12 matches: Darvel
- Longest unbeaten run: 18 matches: Pollok
- Longest winless run: 17 matches: Blantyre Victoria
- Longest losing run: 13 matches: Bonnyton Thistle
- All statistics correct as of 28 May 2022.

The Premier Division remained with the same 20 clubs as before, after the 2020–21 season was declared null and void. This would be reduced to 16 clubs for the 2022–23 season as 7 clubs were relegated.

Darvel won the title with one round of fixtures to play on 7 May 2022, with a 3–2 home victory over Kilwinning Rangers. However they were unsuccessful in their attempt to gain promotion to the Lowland League, finishing second to Tranent Juniors in the Lowland League play-off.

Location of teams in 2021–22 West of Scotland League Premier Division

=== Stadia and locations ===
Club	Location	Ground	Capacity	Seats	Floodlit
Auchinleck Talbot ^{[SFA]}	Auchinleck	Beechwood Park	4,000	500	Yes
Beith Juniors	Beith	Bellsdale Park	1,500	0	No
Benburb	Drumoyne, Glasgow	New Tinto Park	1,000	500	Yes
Blantyre Victoria	Blantyre	Castle Park	2,500	0	No
Bonnyton Thistle	Kilmarnock	Bonnyton Park	1,000	100	Yes
Clydebank ^{[SFA]}	Clydebank	Holm Park	3,500	0	Yes
Cumbernauld United	Cumbernauld Village	Guy's Meadow	2,500	0	No
Cumnock Juniors ^{[SFA]}	Cumnock	Townhead Park	3,000	0	Yes
Darvel ^{[SFA]}	Darvel	Recreation Park	2,200	60	Yes
Glenafton Athletic	New Cumnock	Loch Park	3,400	250	No
Hurlford United	Hurlford	Blair Park	1,500	0	No
Irvine Meadow ^{[SFA]}	Irvine	Meadow Park	5,200	700	Yes
Kilbirnie Ladeside	Kilbirnie	Valefield Park	3,000	0	No
Kilwinning Rangers	Kilwinning	Buffs Park	1,500	270	Yes
Kirkintilloch Rob Roy	Cumbernauld Village	Guy's Meadow	2,500	0	No
Largs Thistle	Largs	Barrfields Stadium	4,500	800	No
Pollok	Pollokshaws, Glasgow	Newlandsfield Park	4,000	0	No
Rossvale	Springburn, Glasgow	Petershill Park	1,500	500	Yes
Rutherglen Glencairn	Rutherglen	New Southcroft Park	1,500	0	Yes
Troon	Troon	Portland Park	2,600	100	No

Notes

1. Kirkintilloch Rob Roy are ground-sharing with Cumbernauld United at Guy's Meadow.
2. Rossvale are ground-sharing with Petershill at Petershill Park.

=== League table ===
Pos	Team	Pld	W	D	L	GF	GA	GD	Pts	Promotion, qualification or relegation
1	Darvel (C)	38	29	3	6	97	48	+49	90	Qualification for the Lowland League play-off
2	Auchinleck Talbot	38	26	8	4	82	28	+54	86	
3	Pollok	38	23	7	8	76	37	+39	76	
4	Clydebank	38	21	8	9	65	46	+19	71	
5	Kilwinning Rangers	38	17	10	11	70	44	+26	61	
6	Hurlford United	38	17	10	11	56	50	+6	61	
7	Cumnock Juniors	38	18	3	17	67	58	+9	57	
8	Irvine Meadow	38	17	5	16	55	55	0	56	
9	Kirkintilloch Rob Roy	38	17	5	16	63	67	−4	56	
10	Largs Thistle	38	16	7	15	79	60	+19	55	
11	Beith Juniors	38	15	9	14	79	61	+18	54	
12	Glenafton Athletic	38	16	5	17	59	59	0	53	
13	Troon	38	16	5	17	58	62	−4	53	
14	Benburb (R)	38	15	7	16	69	62	+7	52	Relegation to the First Division
15	Rutherglen Glencairn (R)	38	14	8	16	59	68	−9	50	Relegation to the First Division
16	Kilbirnie Ladeside (R)	38	11	7	20	48	70	−22	40	Relegation to the First Division
17	Cumbernauld United (R)	38	10	7	21	47	77	−30	37	Relegation to the First Division
18	Rossvale (R)	38	11	4	23	52	92	−40	37	Relegation to the First Division
19	Blantyre Victoria (R)	38	5	5	28	40	97	−57	20	Relegation to the First Division
20	Bonnyton Thistle (R)	38	3	3	32	38	118	−80	12	Relegation to the First Division

Rules for classification: 1) Points; 2) Goal difference; 3) Goals scored
(C) Champions; (R) Relegated

=== Results ===
Home \ Away	AUC	BEI	BNB	BLV	BON	CLY	CMU	CMN	DAR	GLE	HUR	IVM	KLB	KWN	KRR	LRG	PLK	ROS	RUG	TRO
Auchinleck Talbot	—	1–1	5–0	3–1	3–0	2–2	3–0	1–2	1–2	2–0	1–0	2–1	0–0	3–1	0–1	2–1	1–0	2–0	6–0	2–1
Beith Juniors	1–2	—	2–2	2–1	6–1	0–0	3–2	0–1	1–2	1–3	4–0	1–1	3–1	1–0	5–0	5–0	0–1	5–0	3–3	2–2
Benburb	2–2	3–1	—	4–1	3–2	4–0	4–1	1–2	3–4	3–0	0–3	0–1	3–2	0–0	1–0	3–2	3–3	0–1	0–2	5–1
Blantyre Victoria	0–3	1–3	3–2	—	2–0	1–3	0–3	0–4	1–6	1–1	2–2	1–2	1–1	1–1	0–1	0–5	0–1	3–2	0–3	0–2
Bonnyton Thistle	0–2	2–7	1–5	3–0	—	1–4	2–2	1–1	0–5	4–3	1–3	0–1	1–2	0–6	0–2	1–8	3–1	1–3	0–2	1–3
Clydebank	0–2	1–1	1–0	2–1	2–1	—	2–2	2–1	2–2	0–2	1–3	2–2	2–0	0–1	2–3	4–1	0–2	2–1	3–3	3–1
Cumbernauld United	0–5	1–3	1–1	3–2	3–2	0–2	—	3–3	2–3	0–0	1–0	4–1	2–2	3–2	1–4	0–4	1–2	2–0	1–1	0–1
Cumnock Juniors	2–3	1–0	4–0	3–0	1–1	0–2	1–3	—	1–3	1–4	5–2	0–2	2–1	1–0	1–2	4–2	1–0	3–1	6–2	3–4
Darvel	2–2	1–0	3–1	3–2	3–0 (Note: Match played at Portland Park, Troon, due to ongoing renovation work at Recreation Park.)	0–3	3–1	0–1	—	2–1	2–4	2–2	2–1	3–2	5–2	2–1	2–1	7–2	2–0 (Note: Match played at Portland Park, Troon, due to ongoing renovation work at Recreation Park.)	3–2
Glenafton Athletic	0–1	3–2	0–3	2–0 (Note: The match was abandoned after 37 minutes, as Blantyre Victoria were reduced to six players, having started with seven. The match, which Glenafton were leading 2–0 at the time, was awarded to Glenafton.)	1–0	1–3	3–0	1–0	1–2	—	1–2	2–1	1–2	1–2	3–1	1–3	1–1	1–2	0–2	3–1
Hurlford United	1–1	0–2	3–1	2–1	1–0	2–1	1–0	1–0	0–2	0–2	—	1–1	3–2	1–1	3–0	0–2	0–0	3–0	1–1	1–1
Irvine Meadow	1–5	1–2	1–0	1–1	2–1	0–2	2–0	3–1	1–3	1–3	1–2	—	0–1	1–3	3–5	2–1	1–2	1–2	3–0	2–0
Kilbirnie Ladeside	1–4	0–0	3–3	2–1	1–0	1–5	2–0	2–0	2–1	1–2	5–0	0–3	—	1–4	1–1	1–2	0–2	1–6	2–1	1–2
Kilwinning Rangers	1–0	4–1	0–2	5–0	4–0	0–1	1–0	0–3	1–0	3–3	0–2	0–1	2–0	—	1–1	0–0	2–0	4–1	3–0	3–0
Kirkintilloch Rob Roy	0–2	4–2	0–2	3–2	4–2	0–1	4–1	1–0	1–2	2–2	0–0 (Note: Match played at Duncansfield Park, Kilsyth, due to a clashing fixture at Guy's Meadow.)	2–1	1–0	2–3	—	1–2 (Note: Match played at Duncansfield Park, Kilsyth.)	1–4	3–1	0–3	2–3
Largs Thistle	1–1	8–1	3–0	2–3	5–1	3–0	1–0	1–2	0–2	2–0	3–3	1–0	1–3	2–2	2–2	—	0–2	4–2	0–2	1–2
Pollok	3–3	5–1	1–0	5–1	6–0	1–2	5–1	4–0	1–0	2–0	1–1	0–1	3–1	2–1	0–3	1–1	—	1–0	1–1	2–1
Rossvale	0–1	2–7	1–5	3–1	3–2	0–0	2–1	1–4	1–6	1–2	2–1	1–3	1–1	1–1	1–0	1–2	1–6	—	1–1	2–0
Rutherglen Glencairn	0–1	1–0	2–0	3–2	3–0	1–2	0–1	2–1	1–3	1–5	1–4	1–2	3–1	4–4	1–2	1–1	1–2	3–2	—	1–2
Troon	0–2	0–0	0–0	1–3	5–3	0–1	0–1	2–1	0–2	4–0	1–0	1–2	2–0	2–2	4–2	3–1	1–2	2–1	1–2	—

Legend: Blue = home team win; Yellow = draw; Red = away team win.

== Tier 7 ==
The Conferences reverted back to their original lineup at the start of the 2020–21 season, after it was declared null and void. The winners of each Conference were promoted to the Premier Division for the 2022–23 season, and positions 2 to 4 became part of a 16-team First Division alongside the seven relegated clubs. Positions 5 to 9 in each Conference plus the best 10th place club made up the Second Division, with the remaining clubs forming a Third Division in 2022–23.

=== Conference A ===
West of Scotland Football League Conference A
- Season: 2021–22
- Dates: 17 July 2021 – 14 May 2022
- Champions: Arthurlie
- Promoted: Arthurlie
- Matches: 240
- Goals: 1,042 (4.34 per match)
- Biggest home win: Arthurlie 8–0 Lugar Boswell Thistle (23 April 2022)
- Biggest away win: Saltcoats Victoria 0–12 Whitletts Victoria (6 November 2021)
- Highest scoring: Lugar Boswell Thistle 3–10 Arthurlie (4 August 2021)
- Longest winning run: 14 matches: Arthurlie
- Longest unbeaten run: 30 matches: Arthurlie
- Longest winless run: 13 matches: Irvine Victoria
- Longest losing run: 12 matches: Lugar Boswell Thistle
- All statistics correct as of 14 May 2022.

==== Stadia and locations ====
Team	Location	Home ground	Capacity	Seats	Floodlit
Arthurlie	Barrhead	Dunterlie Park	3,000	0	No
Bellshill Athletic	Bellshill	Rockburn Park	500	0	No
Craigmark Burntonians	Dalmellington	Station Park	2,200	0	No
Forth Wanderers	Forth	Kingshill Park	3,500	0	No
Girvan ^{[SFA]}	Girvan	Hamilton Park	5,000	200	No
Glasgow University ^{[SFA]}	Airdrie	Excelsior Stadium	10,101	10,101	Yes
Irvine Victoria	Irvine	Victoria Park	1,800	0	No
Johnstone Burgh	Johnstone	Keanie Park	5,000	0	No
Lesmahagow	Lesmahagow	Craighead Park	3,500	0	No
Lugar Boswell Thistle	Lugar	Rosebank Park	2,000	0	No
Maryhill	Maryhill, Glasgow	Lochburn Park	1,800	205	Yes
Maybole Juniors	Maybole	Ladywell Stadium	2,000	0	No
Muirkirk Juniors	Muirkirk	Burnside Park	2,300	0	No
Saltcoats Victoria	Saltcoats	Campbell Park	2,500	0	No
Shotts Bon Accord	Shotts	Hannah Park	4,000	0	Yes
Whitletts Victoria	Ayr	Dam Park Stadium	3,000	478	Yes

Notes

1. Glasgow University are ground-sharing with Airdrieonians at the Excelsior Stadium.

==== League table ====
Pos	Team	Pld	W	D	L	GF	GA	GD	Pts	Promotion or qualification
1	Arthurlie (C, P)	30	28	2	0	109	29	+80	86	Promotion to the Premier Division
2	Shotts Bon Accord	30	23	1	6	101	30	+71	70	Qualification for the First Division
3	Johnstone Burgh	30	17	6	7	71	35	+36	57	Qualification for the First Division
4	Whitletts Victoria	30	17	6	7	90	55	+35	57	Qualification for the First Division
5	Craigmark Burntonians	30	17	4	9	88	66	+22	55	Qualification for the Second Division
6	Maybole Juniors	30	16	4	10	61	50	+11	52	Qualification for the Second Division
7	Forth Wanderers	30	15	4	11	54	44	+10	49	Qualification for the Second Division
8	Maryhill	30	15	4	11	62	61	+1	49	Qualification for the Second Division
9	Glasgow University	30	13	3	14	57	58	−1	42	Qualification for the Second Division
10	Muirkirk Juniors	30	11	7	12	63	58	+5	40	Qualification for the Second Division
11	Bellshill Athletic	30	11	2	17	63	85	−22	35	Qualification for the Third Division
12	Girvan	30	10	4	16	60	72	−12	34	Qualification for the Third Division
13	Lesmahagow	30	9	6	15	58	60	−2	33	Qualification for the Third Division
14	Lugar Boswell Thistle	30	4	2	24	41	117	−76	14	Qualification for the Third Division
15	Irvine Victoria	30	2	4	24	43	91	−48	10	Qualification for the Third Division
16	Saltcoats Victoria	30	2	1	27	21	131	−110	7	Qualification for the Third Division

Rules for classification: 1) Points; 2) Goal difference; 3) Goals scored
(C) Champions; (P) Promoted

==== Results ====
Home \ Away	ART	BEL	CRB	FOR	GIR	GLU	IRV	JOB	LES	LBT	MAR	MAY	MUI	SAL	SBA	WHV
Arthurlie	—	6–0	2–0	3–0	4–0	2–1	3–1	5–2	2–0	8–0	2–0	3–2	3–3	5–0	2–1	3–2
Bellshill Athletic	0–6	—	7–3	0–1	1–2	1–2	1–0	0–5	3–2	5–2	0–3 (Note: Match awarded 3–0 to Maryhill, as Bellshill Athletic were unable to field a team.)	4–1	4–4	4–0	2–3	4–7
Craigmark Burntonians	4–6	3–0	—	4–2	3–2	6–2	3–2	4–3	5–3	5–1	3–1	1–2	2–2	6–1	3–0	1–3
Forth Wanderers	1–2	1–4	1–3	—	1–0	2–0	3–1	0–1	3–2	6–2	0–1	3–0	0–1	4–1	0–6	0–0
Girvan	1–5	1–5	4–2	0–3	—	1–2	3–2	1–2	1–8	5–0	2–3	1–1	2–1	2–0	2–4	0–2
Glasgow University	2–3	4–3	3–0 (Note: Match played at Lochburn Park, Maryhill.)	1–1	2–3 (Note: Match played at Lochburn Park, Maryhill.)	—	3–1	0–1	1–0	2–0 (Note: Match played at Garscube Sports Complex.)	1–0	3–3	2–1	7–0	1–4	3–0
Irvine Victoria	0–2	1–2	1–2	2–3	5–5	1–5	—	3–1	1–5	1–1	1–4	1–2	0–3	1–1	1–5	1–2
Johnstone Burgh	1–1	3–1	1–1	0–1	0–0	2–0	4–1	—	2–2	4–0	1–2	1–0	6–1	8–1	2–1	1–2
Lesmahagow Juniors	1–2	5–1	0–2	2–4	1–1	1–1	2–2	1–2	—	1–0	3–1	1–2	0–0	3–1	0–7	1–2
Lugar Boswell Thistle	3–10	1–2	4–7	1–1	0–5	0–3	4–3	1–3	2–5	—	1–2	3–5	0–6	5–1	0–5	2–8
Maryhill	1–6	2–2	1–3	4–1	4–2	5–2	5–3	0–3 (Note: Match awarded 3–0 to Johnstone Burgh, after the game was initially postponed due to an unplayable pitch in November.)	0–0	1–0	—	4–2	1–3	2–1	1–4	1–3
Maybole Juniors	0–2	3–1	2–1	0–2	2–0	4–1	2–0	0–1	6–0	2–1	4–1	—	4–3	2–1	2–1	1–1
Muirkirk Juniors	2–3	5–0	2–2	0–0	3–2	2–1	2–5	0–0	0–3	1–2	1–3	3–2	—	3–0 (Note: Match awarded 3–0 to Muirkirk Juniors, as Saltcoats Victoria were unable to field a team.)	2–4	4–0
Saltcoats Victoria	0–4	1–4	1–5	1–9	1–6	2–1	2–1	0–6	0–3	2–3	2–4	0–3	1–3	—	0–6	0–12
Shotts Bon Accord	0–2	4–0	4–1	0–1	1–0	5–0	5–0	3–2	2–1	4–0	2–2	4–0	4–1	7–0	—	3–1
Whitletts Victoria	1–2	4–2	3–3	2–0	4–6	4–1	6–1	3–3	4–2	4–2	3–3	2–2	2–1	2–0	1–2	—

Legend: Blue = home team win; Yellow = draw; Red = away team win.

=== Conference B ===
West of Scotland Football League Conference B
- Season: 2021–22
- Dates: 17 July 2021 – 30 April 2022
- Champions: Cambuslang Rangers
- Promoted: Cambuslang Rangers
- Matches: 210
- Goals: 963 (4.59 per match)
- Biggest home win: Thorniewood United 11–0 Newmains United (6 November 2021)
- Biggest away win: Newmains United 0–9 St Cadoc's (2 April 2022)
- Highest scoring: Dalry Thistle 2–10 Ashfield (31 July 2021)
- Longest winning run: 12 matches: Cambuslang Rangers
- Longest unbeaten run: 16 matches: Cambuslang Rangers
- Longest winless run: 16 matches: Royal Albert
- Longest losing run: 14 matches: Royal Albert
- All statistics correct as of 30 April 2022.

==== Stadia and locations ====
Team	Location	Home ground	Capacity	Seats	Floodlit
Ardeer Thistle	Stevenston	Ardeer Stadium	3,500	0	No
Ashfield	Possilpark, Glasgow	Ashfield Stadium	3,500	600	Yes
Cambuslang Rangers	Cambuslang	Somervell Park	3,000	0	No
Carluke Rovers	Carluke	John Cumming Stadium	1,500	0	Yes
Dalry Thistle	Dalry	Merksworth Park	3,000	0	No
Gartcairn	Airdrie	MTC Park	500	0	Yes
Glasgow United	Shettleston, Glasgow	Greenfield Park	1,800	10	No
Greenock Juniors	Greenock	Ravenscraig Stadium	6,000	1,000	Yes
Kello Rovers	Kirkconnel	Nithside Park	1,700	0	No
Newmains United	Newmains	Victoria Park	1,000	0	No
Port Glasgow	Port Glasgow	Port Glasgow Community Stadium	2,000	0	Yes
Renfrew	Renfrew	New Western Park	1,000	0	Yes
Royal Albert	Stonehouse	Tileworks Park	1,000	0	No
St Cadoc's	Shieldhall, Glasgow	McKenna Park	1,000	0	No
Thorniewood United	Viewpark	Robertson Park	3,000	0	No

Notes

1. St Cadoc's are ground-sharing with St Anthony's at McKenna Park.

==== League table ====
Pos	Team	Pld	W	D	L	GF	GA	GD	Pts	Promotion or qualification
1	Cambuslang Rangers (C, P)	28	25	1	2	114	21	+93	76	Promotion to the Premier Division
2	St Cadoc's	28	19	4	5	93	32	+61	61	Qualification for the First Division
3	Gartcairn	28	19	4	5	95	43	+52	61	Qualification for the First Division
4	Thorniewood United	28	19	3	6	85	35	+50	60	Qualification for the First Division
5	Renfrew	28	16	5	7	81	49	+32	53	Qualification for the Second Division
6	Ardeer Thistle	28	13	4	11	62	61	+1	43	Qualification for the Second Division
7	Ashfield	28	13	3	12	77	58	+19	42	Qualification for the Second Division
8	Greenock Juniors	28	12	6	10	68	54	+14	42	Qualification for the Second Division
9	Glasgow United	28	12	6	10	58	59	−1	42	Qualification for the Second Division
10	Port Glasgow	28	11	3	14	62	77	−15	36	Qualification for the Third Division
11	Carluke Rovers	28	7	3	18	44	96	−52	24	Qualification for the Third Division
12	Kello Rovers	28	5	7	16	34	66	−32	22	Qualification for the Third Division
13	Dalry Thistle	28	6	3	19	37	88	−51	21	Qualification for the Third Division
14	Newmains United	28	3	2	23	32	113	−81	11	Qualification for the Third Division
15	Royal Albert	28	1	4	23	21	111	−90	7	Qualification for the Third Division

Rules for classification: 1) Points; 2) Goal difference; 3) Goals scored
(C) Champions; (P) Promoted

==== Results ====
Home \ Away	ARD	ASH	CAM	CAR	DAL	GAR	GLU	GRE	KEL	NUC	PGL	REN	ROA	STC	THO
Ardeer Thistle	—	0–2	1–4	4–1	2–2	0–2	3–2	2–3	0–0	3–2	3–2	1–3	4–0	2–4	1–0
Ashfield	1–1	—	0–3	6–0	3–2	2–4	3–3	4–4	1–2	6–2	6–1	2–4	6–1	0–2	2–4
Cambuslang Rangers	7–0	2–0	—	8–0	4–0	3–1	3–0	7–3	5–1	4–0	5–0	4–1	10–1	2–3	2–1
Carluke Rovers	3–5	2–3	0–3	—	1–2	1–4	5–4	0–8	1–0	1–2	2–2	1–6	4–0	1–4	0–5
Dalry Thistle	2–3	2–10	0–2	1–2	—	2–1	0–1	0–5	1–2	1–0	6–0	1–5	2–0	1–6	1–3
Gartcairn	3–2	4–0	2–0	6–0	7–1	—	2–2	6–3	2–1	6–0	4–4	2–1	6–1	2–2	3–3
Glasgow United	2–1	0–5	1–5	3–1	6–1	3–2	—	1–1	0–0	2–1	3–1	2–2	5–1	2–0	0–4 (Note: Match played at McKenna Park, Shieldhall.)
Greenock Juniors	0–1	3–1	1–2	4–2	4–1	1–0	4–0	—	1–1	4–4	3–2	0–3	4–1	3–2	2–3
Kello Rovers	1–4	2–3	1–5	2–3	0–1	1–5	1–1	1–1	—	4–1	1–3	1–1	1–1	1–7	2–3
Newmains United	2–3	0–3	2–8	1–4	2–1	1–6	1–7	1–0	1–2	—	3–6	1–2	0–2 (Note: Match played at John Cumming Stadium, Carluke.)	0–9	1–5
Port Glasgow	4–2	0–1	0–1	3–1	5–1	2–4	5–1	3–0	3–1	4–2	—	1–7	5–2	2–2	0–1
Renfrew	3–7	5–1	2–2	2–4	2–2	2–3	2–1	3–1	3–0	3–1	6–2	—	6–0	1–4	1–1
Royal Albert	1–6	0–4	0–6	3–3	1–1 (Note: Match played at John Cumming Stadium, Carluke.)	0–4	0–2	1–4	1–4	1–1 (Note: Match played at Victoria Park, Newmains.)	1–2	0–1	—	0–3	0–4
St Cadoc's	1–1	4–2	0–2	4–0	4–2	3–0	4–1	1–1	4–0	5–0	4–0	1–2	8–0	—	2–1
Thorniewood United	4–0	1–0	0–5	1–1	7–0	2–4	1–3	1–0	4–1	11–0	4–0	3–2	5–2	3–0	—

Legend: Blue = home team win; Yellow = draw; Red = away team win.

=== Conference C ===
West of Scotland Football League Conference C
- Season: 2021–22
- Dates: 17 July 2021 – 7 May 2022
- Champions: Petershill
- Promoted: Petershill
- Matches: 210
- Goals: 775 (3.69 per match)
- Biggest home win: Neilston 8–0 St Anthony's (22 January 2022); Neilston 8–0 Glasgow Perthshire (29 January 2022)
- Biggest away win: Yoker Athletic 0–8 Petershill (9 October 2021)
- Highest scoring: Glasgow Perthshire 6–5 Vale of Leven (19 February 2022)
- Longest winning run: 17 matches: Petershill
- Longest unbeaten run: 21 matches: Petershill
- Longest winless run: 24 matches: Lanark United
- Longest losing run: 9 matches: Ardrossan Winton Rovers
- All statistics correct as of 7 May 2022.

==== Stadia and locations ====
Team	Location	Home ground	Capacity	Seats	Floodlit
Ardrossan Winton Rovers	Ardrossan	Winton Park	3,000	80	Yes
Drumchapel United	Drumchapel, Glasgow	Donald Dewar Centre	TBC	0	Yes
East Kilbride Thistle	East Kilbride	The Showpark	2,300	0	No
Glasgow Perthshire	Possilpark, Glasgow	Keppoch Park	1,800	0	No
Kilsyth Rangers	Kilsyth	Duncansfield	2,000	0	No
Lanark United	Lanark	Moor Park	4,000	0	No
Larkhall Thistle	Larkhall	Gasworks Park	2,000	0	No
Neilston	Neilston	Brig-o-Lea Stadium	2,000	0	Yes
Petershill	Springburn, Glasgow	Petershill Park	1,500	500	Yes
St Anthony's	Shieldhall, Glasgow	McKenna Park	1,000	0	No
St Roch's	Provanmill, Glasgow	James McGrory Park	2,000	0	No
Vale of Clyde	Tollcross, Glasgow	Fullarton Park	2,500	0	No
Vale of Leven	Alexandria	Millburn Park	3,000	0	No
Wishaw	Wishaw	Beltane Park	1,000	0	No
Yoker Athletic	Clydebank	Holm Park	3,500	0	Yes

==== League table ====
Pos	Team	Pld	W	D	L	GF	GA	GD	Pts	Promotion or qualification
1	Petershill (C, P)	28	22	4	2	79	25	+54	70	Promotion to the Premier Division
2	Drumchapel United	28	23	1	4	89	36	+53	70	Qualification for the First Division
3	Neilston	28	20	2	6	66	25	+41	62	Qualification for the First Division
4	St Roch's	28	16	6	6	65	39	+26	54	Qualification for the First Division
5	Wishaw	28	11	8	9	56	53	+3	41	Qualification for the Second Division
6	St Anthony's	28	12	4	12	43	59	−16	40	Qualification for the Second Division
7	Kilsyth Rangers	28	12	1	15	46	43	+3	37	Qualification for the Second Division
8	Yoker Athletic	28	11	4	13	50	61	−11	37	Qualification for the Second Division
9	Glasgow Perthshire	28	11	4	13	57	69	−12	37	Qualification for the Second Division
10	Larkhall Thistle	28	10	4	14	41	61	−20	34	Qualification for the Third Division
11	East Kilbride Thistle	28	9	3	16	41	64	−23	30	Qualification for the Third Division
12	Vale of Clyde	28	7	6	15	41	55	−14	27	Qualification for the Third Division
13	Ardrossan Winton Rovers	28	5	7	16	42	59	−17	22	Qualification for the Third Division
14	Vale of Leven	28	5	5	18	32	62	−30	20	Qualification for the Third Division
15	Lanark United	28	3	7	18	27	64	−37	16	Qualification for the Third Division

Rules for classification: 1) Points; 2) Goal difference; 3) Goals scored
(C) Champions; (P) Promoted

==== Results ====
Home \ Away	AWR	DRU	EKT	GLP	KRA	LAN	LAR	NEI	PET	STA	STR	VOC	VOL	WSH	YOK
Ardrossan Winton Rovers	—	2–3	2–4	2–6	0–1	6–0	1–1	2–3	1–1	1–3	2–2	0–2	0–0	1–2	0–1
Drumchapel United	6–0 (Note: Match played at Petershill Park.)	—	2–1	1–0 (Note: Match played at Lochburn Park, Maryhill.)	3–1 (Note: Match played at New Tinto Park, Drumoyne.)	3–0	5–1	4–2 (Note: Match played at New Tinto Park, Drumoyne.)	2–3 (Note: Match played at New Tinto Park, Drumoyne.)	7–1 (Note: Match played at Petershill Park.)	5–3 (Note: Match played at Lochburn Park, Maryhill.)	4–2	2–1	4–0	5–2
East Kilbride Thistle	0–5 (Note: Match played at Castle Park, Blantyre, due to ongoing renovation work at The Showpark.)	0–2	—	1–3 (Note: Match played at John Cumming Stadium, Carluke, due to ongoing renovation work at The Showpark.)	2–1	0–2	2–1	0–3 (Note: Match played at Castle Park, Blantyre, due to ongoing renovation work at The Showpark.)	1–6	2–0 (Note: Match played at Castle Park, Blantyre, due to ongoing renovation work at The Showpark.)	2–4 (Note: Match played at K-Park, due to ongoing renovation work at The Showpark.)	2–3	3–1	5–3	3–1
Glasgow Perthshire	2–1	0–3	3–1	—	4–3	3–1	3–2	1–2	0–1	1–2	3–3	1–3	6–5	2–3	1–3
Kilsyth Rangers	4–0	0–1	3–0	2–3	—	3–0	1–2	1–2	2–2	2–1	2–1	0–2	1–0	0–3	2–3
Lanark United	1–2 (Note: Match played at Dalziel Park, Motherwell.)	0–6	2–2	1–1 (Note: Match played at John Cumming Stadium, Carluke.)	1–0	—	2–1	1–2	3–4	3–3	0–2	1–1	1–1	0–2	1–3
Larkhall Thistle	2–1	0–3	3–2	2–2	3–2	1–0	—	0–5	0–4	1–0	0–0	2–0	0–2	2–2	2–1
Neilston	4–2	2–1	1–0	8–0	1–0	1–0	2–1	—	0–2	8–0	1–2	1–0	1–1	1–0	5–1
Petershill	2–0	2–3	2–1	3–1	3–0	2–0	6–2	1–0	—	4–1	3–0	4–1	4–0	2–2	2–0
St Anthony's	2–3	3–2	0–0	1–0	1–2	4–1	2–1	1–0	1–3	—	1–3	1–1	1–0	2–2	1–6
St Roch's	3–2	3–1	1–1	4–2	3–0	2–1	3–2	0–2	2–0	1–3	—	2–0	4–0	5–1	1–2
Vale of Clyde	0–2	3–3	1–2	3–3	1–3	1–1	2–3	0–2	1–3	1–3	0–0	—	0–1	3–5	3–1
Vale of Leven	2–2	2–4	0–3	1–2	1–2	2–1	3–0	1–5	0–1	0–1	1–7	3–1	—	0–1	1–2
Wishaw	0–0	1–2	5–0	5–1	0–5	3–3	2–4	2–2	1–1	2–0	1–3	1–4	4–0	—	2–0
Yoker Athletic	2–2	1–2	4–1	2–3	0–3	3–0	3–2	1–0	0–8	2–4	1–1	1–2	3–3	1–1	—

Legend: Blue = home team win; Yellow = draw; Red = away team win.

== Division Four ==
West of Scotland Football League Division Four
- Season: 2021–22
- Dates: 17 July 2021 – 16 April 2022
- Champions: Finnart
- Matches: 112
- Goals: 478 (4.27 per match)
- Biggest home win: Harmony Row 11–1 Campbeltown Pupils (20 November 2021)
- Biggest away win: BSC Glasgow 0–7 Harmony Row (28 August 2021)
- Highest scoring: Harmony Row 11–1 Campbeltown Pupils (20 September 2021)
- Longest winning run: 6 matches: Finnart
- Longest unbeaten run: 10 matches: Finnart
- Longest winless run: 14 matches: Harthill Royal
- Longest losing run: 6 matches: BSC Glasgow
- All statistics correct as of 16 April 2022.

Division Four contained eight new clubs accepted for the 2021–22 season. Westerton United withdrew before the season began.

=== Stadia and locations ===
Team	Location	Home ground	Capacity	Seats	Floodlit
BSC Glasgow	Springburn, Glasgow	Springburn Park	TBC	0	Yes
Campbeltown Pupils	Campbeltown	Kintyre Park	TBC	0	No
Finnart	Springburn, Glasgow	Springburn Park	TBC	0	Yes
Glenvale	Paisley	Ferguslie Sports Centre	TBC	0	Yes
Harmony Row	Drumoyne, Glasgow	New Tinto Park	1,000	500	Yes
Harthill Royal	Harthill	Gibbshill Park	1,800	0	No
Kilsyth Athletic	Kilsyth	Kilsyth Sports Field	TBC	0	No
St. Peter's	Renfrew	New Western Park	1,000	0	Yes

Notes

1. Harmony Row are ground-sharing with Benburb at New Tinto Park.
2. St. Peter's are ground-sharing with Renfrew at New Western Park.

=== League table ===
Pos	Team	Pld	W	D	L	GF	GA	GD	Pts	Promotion or qualification
1	Finnart (C, P)	28	21	3	4	71	29	+42	66	Promotion to the Third Division
2	Kilsyth Athletic	28	18	3	7	87	48	+39	57	Qualification for the Fourth Division
3	Harmony Row	28	16	3	9	86	49	+37	51	Qualification for the Fourth Division
4	St. Peter's	28	15	2	11	67	52	+15	47	Qualification for the Fourth Division
5	Glenvale	28	11	2	15	50	61	−11	35	Qualification for the Fourth Division
6	Campbeltown Pupils	28	6	5	17	44	87	−43	23	Qualification for the Fourth Division
7	BSC Glasgow	28	6	5	17	36	81	−45	23	Qualification for the Fourth Division
8	Harthill Royal	28	5	5	18	37	71	−34	20	Transferred to the East of Scotland League

Rules for classification: 1) Points; 2) Goal difference; 3) Goals scored
(C) Champions; (P) Promoted

=== Results ===
Home \ Away	BSC	CAM	FIN	GLE	HRW	HRR	KIL	STP	BSC	CAM	FIN	GLE	HRW	HRR	KIL	STP
BSC Glasgow	—	2–3	0–4	3–3	0–7	2–2	0–2 (Note: Match played at Kilsyth Sports Field.)	0–2	—	3–3	1–2	2–3	0–4 (Note: Match played at New Tinto Park, Drumoyne.)	4–1 (Note: Match played at Petershill Park.)	0–6	1–0
Campbeltown Pupils	0–1	—	0–2	0–2	2–6	4–3	0–6	1–3	2–2	—	0–2	2–1	1–4	3–0 (Note: Match awarded 3–0 to Campbeltown Pupils, as Harthill Royal were unable to field a team.)	1–5	1–3
Finnart	5–2	3–2	—	3–1 (Note: Match played at Greenfield Park, Shettleston.)	4–2	0–1 (Note: Match played at Greenfield Park, Shettleston.)	4–0 (Note: Match played at Greenfield Park, Shettleston.)	2–1	4–1	4–1	—	1–2	3–1	3–0 (Note: Match played at Greenfield Park, Shettleston.)	1–1	2–1
Glenvale	2–0	3–2	0–3	—	4–1	3–1	0–4	0–1 (Note: Match played at Keanie Park, Johnstone.)	4–2	1–2	0–4	—	4–3	6–0	1–2	1–3
Harmony Row	3–0	2–2	3–4	1–1	—	2–0	3–2	4–1	0–2	11–1	0–2	5–1	—	4–0	2–1	5–1 (Note: Match played at Sir Alex Ferguson Park, Shieldhall.)
Harthill Royal	0–0	1–3	0–2	2–1	1–2	—	4–0	3–2	1–2	1–1	1–1	4–2	0–3	—	2–2	2–3
Kilsyth Athletic	5–2	5–2 (Note: Match played at Duncansfield Park.)	2–0	5–1	5–1	4–3	—	3–2	5–0	3–3	1–3	0–1	2–1	7–3	—	4–3
St. Peter's	8–2	3–2	3–1	3–1	2–3	3–1	2–3	—	0–2	5–0	2–2	2–1	3–3	2–0	3–2 (Note: Match played at Springburn Park.)	—

Legend: Blue = home team win; Yellow = draw; Red = away team win.

== Notes ==
^{SFA} Club with an SFA Licence eligible to participate in the Lowland League promotion play-off should they win the Premier Division.
