= 2022–23 West of Scotland Football League =

West of Scotland Football League
- Season: 2022–23

The 2022–23 West of Scotland Football League (known as the PDM Buildbase West of Scotland League for sponsorship reasons) was the third season of the West of Scotland Football League, with its top division as part of the sixth tier of the Scottish football pyramid system. The season began on 29 July 2022 and ended on 27 May 2023. Darvel were the reigning champions.

== Teams ==
=== To West of Scotland Football League ===
Transferred from South of Scotland Football League

- Threave Rovers

Transferred from Ayrshire Amateur Football League

- Eglinton (played 2021–22 as Kilwinning Rangers Amateurs)

Transferred from Caledonian Amateur Football League

- Thorn Athletic

Transferred from Central Scottish Amateur Football League

- West Park United

Transferred from Scottish Amateur Football League

- Easterhouse Academy (played 2021–22 as Easthall Star)

Newly established

- Rossvale Academy

=== From West of Scotland Football League ===
Transferred to East of Scotland Football League

- Harthill Royal

== Premier Division ==
West of Scotland Football League Premier Division
- Season: 2022–23
- Dates: 30 July 2022 – 13 May 2023
- Champions: Beith Juniors
- Relegated: Cambuslang Rangers; Kilwinning Rangers; Petershill
- Matches: 240
- Goals: 820 (3.42 per match)
- Biggest home win: Arthurlie 11–1 Petershill (8 October 2022)
- Biggest away win: Kilwinning Rangers 0–7 Clydebank (21 April 2023)
- Highest scoring: Arthurlie 11–1 Petershill (8 October 2022)
- Longest winning run: 9 matches: Beith Juniors
- Longest unbeaten run: 16 matches: Beith Juniors
- Longest winless run: 11 matches: Petershill
- Longest losing run: 6 matches: Cambuslang Rangers
- All statistics correct as of 13 May 2023.

The Premier Division reverted to a 16-team division, with Arthurlie, Cambuslang Rangers, and Petershill promoted from the tier 7 Conferences A, B & C respectively. Coupled with a 1–1 draw for Darvel at Hurlford United, a 5–0 win for Beith Juniors over Kilwinning Rangers on 29 April 2023 secured the league title. However, they were ineligible for promotion as they do not hold an SFA club licence.

Location of teams in 2022–23 West of Scotland League Premier Division

=== Stadia and locations ===
Club	Location	Ground	Surface	Capacity	Seats	Floodlit
Arthurlie	Barrhead	Dunterlie Park	Grass	4,000	0	No
Auchinleck Talbot ^{[SFA]}	Auchinleck	Beechwood Park	Grass	4,000	500	Yes
Beith Juniors	Beith	Bellsdale Park	Grass	1,500	0	No
Cambuslang Rangers	Cambuslang	Somervell Park	Grass	3,000	0	No
Clydebank ^{[SFA]}	Clydebank	Holm Park	Artificial	3,500	0	Yes
Cumnock Juniors ^{[SFA]}	Cumnock	Townhead Park	Artificial	3,000	0	Yes
Darvel ^{[SFA]}	Darvel	Recreation Park	Grass	2,000	60	Yes
Glenafton Athletic	New Cumnock	Loch Park	Grass	3,400	250	Yes
Hurlford United	Hurlford	Blair Park	Grass	1,500	0	No
Irvine Meadow XI ^{[SFA]}	Irvine	Meadow Park	Grass	2,132	700	Yes
Kilwinning Rangers ^{[SFA]}	Kilwinning	Buffs Park	Grass	2,800	270	Yes
Kirkintilloch Rob Roy	Cumbernauld	Guy's Meadow (Note: Kirkintilloch Rob Roy are ground-sharing with Cumbernauld United at Guy's Meadow.)	Grass	2,500	0	No
Largs Thistle	Largs	Barrfields Park	Artificial	4,500	800	No
Pollok ^{[SFA]}	Pollokshaws, Glasgow	Newlandsfield Park	Grass	4,000	0	Yes
Petershill	Springburn, Glasgow	Petershill Park	Artificial	2,000	500	Yes
Troon	Troon	Portland Park	Grass	2,600	100	Yes

=== League table ===
Pos	Team	Pld	W	D	L	GF	GA	GD	Pts	Promotion, qualification or relegation
1	Beith Juniors (C)	30	21	3	6	78	40	+38	66	Ineligible for the Lowland League play-off
2	Auchinleck Talbot	30	17	6	7	60	32	+28	57	
3	Darvel	30	17	5	8	71	42	+29	56	
4	Clydebank	30	17	1	12	69	43	+26	52	
5	Pollok	30	14	6	10	56	41	+15	48	
6	Largs Thistle	30	14	5	11	48	42	+6	47	
7	Hurlford United	30	13	6	11	49	47	+2	45	
8	Irvine Meadow XI	30	13	4	13	49	55	−6	43	
9	Cumnock Juniors	30	12	6	12	52	51	+1	42	
10	Glenafton Athletic	30	12	6	12	46	47	−1	42	
11	Troon	30	13	3	14	48	51	−3	42	
12	Kirkintilloch Rob Roy	30	11	3	16	37	44	−7	36	
13	Arthurlie (Note: Arthurlie deducted 3 points for fielding an ineligible player in their 1–3 loss against Clydebank.)	30	10	3	17	40	59	−19	30	
14	Petershill (R)	30	8	4	18	41	82	−41	28	Relegation to the First Division
15	Kilwinning Rangers (R)	30	7	5	18	46	80	−34	26	Relegation to the First Division
16	Cambuslang Rangers (Note: Cambuslang Rangers deducted 3 points for fielding an ineligible player in their 1–3 loss against Beith Juniors.) (R)	30	7	2	21	30	64	−34	20	Relegation to the First Division

Source: West of Scotland Football League
Rules for classification: 1) Points; 2) Goal difference; 3) Goals scored
(C) Champions; (R) Relegated

=== Results ===
Home \ Away	ART	AUC	BEI	CAM	CLY	CMN	DAR	GLE	HUR	IVM	KWN	KRR	LRG	PRH	PLK	TRO
Arthurlie	—	0–3	2–1	0–3	1–3	2–1	3–2	2–4	1–3	2–0	2–1	3–1	1–2	11–1	0–0	1–2
Auchinleck Talbot	2–0	—	1–2	3–1	1–2	4–0	0–3	3–1	3–1	2–2	3–1	1–2	3–0	2–0	2–1	1–1
Beith Juniors	7–1	1–2	—	7–0	2–0	1–1	2–0	1–1	0–2	4–3	5–0	0–3	4–1	7–1	1–0	0–4
Cambuslang Rangers	3–2	0–1	1–3	—	0–3	0–3	0–1	3–2	2–1	1–2	0–3	0–3	2–2	2–2	0–1	1–2
Clydebank	4–0	2–1	0–1	2–0	—	1–2	0–1	6–2	1–2	2–3	5–1	1–0	3–2	2–1	4–2	4–1
Cumnock Juniors	1–0	2–4	3–3	2–0	3–2	—	2–4	3–3	0–0	2–1	5–2	1–2	0–1	3–1	2–2	4–2
Darvel	4–0	2–2	2–3	3–1	2–0	1–2	—	2–2	0–1	5–0	3–1	4–3	1–2	5–1	1–1	5–0
Glenafton Athletic	1–0	3–1	1–2	2–1	3–2	1–0	2–2	—	1–1	0–2	2–0	3–0	0–1	3–1	0–2	0–1
Hurlford United	0–1	0–2	4–3	0–1	1–0	3–1	1–1	2–1	—	0–1	5–4	0–0	2–2	4–0	0–4	2–0
Irvine Meadow XI	0–1	1–3	1–2	3–4	2–2	2–1	1–2	1–0	4–3	—	1–3	1–0	1–1	0–1	2–0	2–1
Kilwinning Rangers	1–1	0–6	2–3	2–0	0–7	1–1	3–6	0–1	2–2	4–2	—	2–0	1–0	3–5	1–1	2–3
Kirkintilloch Rob Roy	0–2	0–0	1–3	3–1	0–3	1–2	2–1	1–2	2–1	0–1	0–0	—	0–1	2–0	0–2	2–0
Largs Thistle	5–0	1–0	1–3	0–1	1–2	2–1	0–2	1–1	4–1	3–1	0–2	1–5	—	4–0	5–1	1–0
Petershill	2–1	1–1	0–3	4–2	1–4	2–1	1–2	0–2	1–2	3–3	4–2	2–0	3–2	—	1–3	0–2
Pollok	2–0	1–1	2–3	1–0	4–1	3–0	2–3	3–2	2–4	0–2	3–0	6–2	0–0	2–0	—	5–3
Troon	0–0	1–2	0–1	1–0	3–1	0–3	4–1	3–0	3–1	3–4	4–2	0–2	1–2	2–2	1–0	—

Legend: Blue = home team win; Yellow = draw; Red = away team win.

== First Division ==
The First Division is made up of the seven teams relegated from the Premier Division, along with those finishing 2nd, 3rd, and 4th in each of the three Conferences. A 1–1 draw at Benburb on the final day of the season allowed Gartcairn to win the league title by one point ahead of St Cadoc's.

=== Stadia and locations ===
Team	Location	Home ground	Capacity	Seats	Floodlit
Benburb ^{[SFA]}	Drumoyne, Glasgow	New Tinto Park	1,000	500	Yes
Blantyre Victoria	Blantyre	Castle Park	2,500	0	No
Bonnyton Thistle ^{[SFA]}	Kilmarnock	Bonnyton Park	1,000	100	Yes
Cumbernauld United	Cumbernauld Village	Guy's Meadow	2,500	0	No
Drumchapel United	Drumchapel, Glasgow	Donald Dewar Centre	TBC	10	Yes
Gartcairn	Airdrie	MTC Park	500	0	Yes
Johnstone Burgh	Johnstone	Keanie Park	5,000	0	No
Kilbirnie Ladeside	Kilbirnie	Valefield Park	3,000	0	No
Neilston	Neilston	Brig-o-Lea Stadium	2,000	0	Yes
Rossvale	Springburn, Glasgow	Petershill Park (Note: Rossvale are ground-sharing with Petershill at Petershill Park.)	1,500	500	Yes
Rutherglen Glencairn ^{[SFA]}	Rutherglen	New Southcroft Park	1,500	0	Yes
Shotts Bon Accord	Shotts	Hannah Park	4,000	0	Yes
St Cadoc's	Drumoyne, Glasgow	New Tinto Park (Note: St Cadoc's are ground-sharing with Benburb at New Tinto Park.)	1,000	500	Yes
St Roch's	Provanmill, Glasgow	James McGrory Park	2,000	0	No
Thorniewood United	Viewpark	Robertson Park	3,000	0	No
Whitletts Victoria	Ayr	Dam Park Stadium	3,000	478	Yes

Notes

Location of teams in 2022–23 West of Scotland League First Division
Location of teams in 2022–23 West of Scotland Football League

=== League table ===
Pos	Team	Pld	W	D	L	GF	GA	GD	Pts	Promotion or relegation
1	Gartcairn (C, P)	30	19	7	4	69	34	+35	64	Promotion to the Premier Division
2	St Cadoc's (P)	30	19	6	5	68	34	+34	63	Promotion to the Premier Division
3	Benburb (P)	30	17	5	8	66	47	+19	56	Promotion to the Premier Division
4	Drumchapel United	30	16	4	10	68	49	+19	52	
5	Blantyre Victoria	30	12	7	11	51	44	+7	43	
6	Kilbirnie Ladeside	30	12	7	11	59	56	+3	43	
7	Johnstone Burgh	30	13	4	13	47	54	−7	43	
8	Neilston	30	11	6	13	43	44	−1	39	
9	Rutherglen Glencairn	30	10	8	12	41	40	+1	38	
10	Shotts Bon Accord	30	11	5	14	45	45	0	38	
11	Thorniewood United	30	12	2	16	49	61	−12	38	
12	St Roch's	30	12	1	17	59	67	−8	37	
13	Whitletts Victoria (Note: Whitletts Victoria deducted 3 points for fielding an ineligible player in their 2–0 win over St Roch's.)	30	11	5	14	55	60	−5	35	
14	Bonnyton Thistle (R)	30	9	4	17	38	75	−37	31	Relegation to the Second Division
15	Cumbernauld United (Note: Cumbernauld United deducted 3 points for fielding an ineligible player.) (R)	30	8	6	16	48	57	−9	27	Relegation to the Second Division
16	Rossvale (R)	30	8	3	19	41	80	−39	27	Relegation to the Second Division

Source: West of Scotland Football League
Rules for classification: 1) Points; 2) Goal difference; 3) Goals scored
(C) Champions; (P) Promoted; (R) Relegated

=== Results ===
Home \ Away	BNB	BLV	BON	CMU	DRU	GAR	JOB	KLB	NEI	ROS	RUG	SBA	SCD	STR	TWU	WHV
Benburb	—	0–1	2–1	3–1	0–2	1–1	2–2	6–3	2–0	3–2	1–0	0–1	2–3	2–0	3–1	5–1
Blantyre Victoria	2–2	—	0–2	2–0	5–2	0–1	2–3	4–0	3–1	1–3	1–0	2–0	0–0	1–4	2–2	1–2
Bonnyton Thistle	0–3	0–2	—	2–1	2–3	1–3	0–3	1–5	2–1	2–1	0–2	2–1	1–6	0–2	1–1	3–2
Cumbernauld United	3–1	2–2	6–1	—	4–2	0–4	2–1	1–1	0–1	1–2	0–2	4–1	0–1	1–2	1–2	1–2
Drumchapel United	3–0	3–2	4–0	3–2 (Note: Match played at New Tinto Park, Drumoyne.)	—	0–3	5–0	2–3	3–0	6–1	2–0	3–3	1–2	6–2	3–1	4–2
Gartcairn	1–1	2–2	5–2	2–0	2–2	—	1–0	2–3	0–1	8–0	2–2	1–0	0–2	4–1	1–0	4–3
Johnstone Burgh	1–2	1–1	0–1	1–1	3–2	0–2	—	1–4	2–1	3–0	5–0	0–1	1–1	5–3	2–1	2–1
Kilbirnie Ladeside	3–4	2–1	2–1	1–3	1–1	3–1	1–2	—	1–1	7–2	4–0	0–0	1–1	0–1	4–3	1–1
Neilston	2–0	2–1	1–1	4–0	1–0	1–2	1–2	2–2	—	4–0	0–1	1–0	3–3	3–2	2–1	1–1
Rossvale	0–3	2–2	5–2	1–1	0–1	1–4	1–2	3–1	2–0	—	0–3	1–5	1–2	2–1	0–3	4–0
Rutherglen Glencairn	1–1	0–1	1–3	1–1	0–0	0–0	1–0	6–0	2–2	3–1	—	0–1	2–2	3–1	5–1	1–1
Shotts Bon Accord	2–5	3–1	1–1	1–3	5–0	2–2	3–1	2–1	2–1	0–1	2–1	—	0–1	2–3	1–2	2–1
St Cadoc's	2–3	3–2	1–2	2–2	1–0	1–2	3–0	0–3	1–0	5–1	2–0	2–1	—	3–1	1–0	2–3
St Roch's	3–5	1–3	7–1	4–2	0–1	2–3	3–0	0–1	3–1	2–2	4–1	2–1	0–5	—	1–2	0–2
Thorniewood United	3–4	1–3	2–1	2–1	3–1	0–2	1–2	3–1	4–2	2–1	0–2	2–1	0–6	3–4	—	2–1
Whitletts Victoria	2–0	0–1	2–2	3–4	1–3	3–4	7–2	1–0	1–3	3–1	2–1	1–1	2–4	2–0	2–1	—

Legend: Blue = home team win; Yellow = draw; Red = away team win.

== Second Division ==
The Second Division consists of the clubs finishing 5th, 6th, 7th, 8th, and 9th in each of the three Conferences, plus the 10th place club with the best points per game record (Muirkirk Juniors). Renfrew won the title with a round of matches to spare, sealing the title with a 2–0 win over Glasgow University.

=== Stadia and locations ===
Team	Location	Home ground	Capacity	Seats	Floodlit
Ardeer Thistle	Stevenston	Ardeer Stadium	3,500	0	No
Ashfield	Possilpark, Glasgow	Ashfield Stadium	3,500	600	Yes
Craigmark Burntonians	Dalmellington	Station Park	2,200	0	No
Forth Wanderers	Forth	Kingshill Park	3,500	0	No
Glasgow Perthshire	Possilpark, Glasgow	Keppoch Park	1,800	0	No
Glasgow United	Shettleston, Glasgow	Greenfield Park	1,800	10	No
Glasgow University ^{[SFA]}	Airdrie	Excelsior Stadium (Note: Glasgow University are ground-sharing with Airdrieonians at the Excelsior Stadium.)	10,101	10,101	Yes
Greenock Juniors	Greenock	Ravenscraig Stadium	6,000	1,000	Yes
Kilsyth Rangers	Kilsyth	Duncansfield	2,000	0	No
Maryhill	Maryhill, Glasgow	Lochburn Park	1,800	205	Yes
Maybole Juniors	Maybole	Ladywell Stadium	2,000	0	No
Muirkirk Juniors	Muirkirk	Burnside Park	2,300	0	No
Renfrew	Renfrew	New Western Park	1,000	0	Yes
St Anthony's	Shieldhall, Glasgow	McKenna Park	1,000	0	No
Wishaw	Wishaw	Beltane Park	1,000	0	No
Yoker Athletic	Clydebank	Holm Park	3,500	0	Yes

Notes

Location of teams in 2022–23 West of Scotland League Second Division
Location of teams in 2022–23 West of Scotland League Second Division in the Greater Glasgow area

=== League table ===
Pos	Team	Pld	W	D	L	GF	GA	GD	Pts	Promotion or relegation
1	Renfrew (C, P)	30	21	7	2	75	37	+38	70	Promotion to the First Division
2	Ashfield (P)	30	20	6	4	92	42	+50	66	Promotion to the First Division
3	Maybole Juniors (Note: Maybole Juniors deducted 3 points for fielding an ineligible player.) (P)	30	18	7	5	71	50	+21	58	Promotion to the First Division
4	Craigmark Burntonians	30	17	5	8	79	49	+30	56	
5	Glasgow Perthshire	30	14	6	10	60	63	−3	48	
6	Yoker Athletic	30	14	4	12	62	47	+15	46	
7	St Anthony's	30	12	7	11	58	55	+3	43	
8	Forth Wanderers	30	11	7	12	46	51	−5	40	
9	Kilsyth Rangers	30	10	9	11	56	57	−1	39	
10	Muirkirk Juniors	30	11	5	14	54	70	−16	38	
11	Wishaw	30	11	4	15	48	62	−14	37	
12	Maryhill	30	11	3	16	53	57	−4	36	
13	Glasgow University	30	11	2	17	49	62	−13	35	
14	Ardeer Thistle (Note: Ardeer Thistle deducted 3 points for fielding an ineligible player.) (R)	30	9	4	17	44	64	−20	28	Relegation to the Third Division
15	Greenock Juniors (R)	30	5	7	18	41	67	−26	22	Relegation to the Third Division
16	Glasgow United (R)	30	2	3	25	34	89	−55	9	Relegation to the Third Division

Source: West of Scotland Football League
Rules for classification: 1) Points; 2) Goal difference; 3) Goals scored
(C) Champions; (P) Promoted; (R) Relegated

=== Results ===
Home \ Away	ARD	ASH	CRB	FOR	GLP	GLA	GLU	GRE	KRA	MAR	MAY	MUI	REN	STA	WSH	YOK
Ardeer Thistle	—	1–2	1–1	2–0	1–2	3–1	1–2	3–0	2–2	1–1	0–2	0–2	0–3	1–4	3–2	3–0
Ashfield	4–0 (Note: Match played at Stepford Football Centre, Barlanark.)	—	2–3	2–1 (Note: Match played at Stepford Football Centre, Barlanark.)	2–2 (Note: Match played at Stepford Football Centre, Barlanark.)	6–0 (Note: Match played at Stepford Football Centre, Barlanark.)	4–3 (Note: Match played at Stepford Football Centre, Barlanark.)	4–0 (Note: Match played at Stepford Football Centre, Barlanark.)	3–1	3–0	5–5	6–0 (Note: Match played at Stepford Football Centre, Barlanark.)	2–3 (Note: Match played at Stepford Football Centre, Barlanark.)	2–2 (Note: Match played at the Donald Dewar Centre, Drumchapel, due to a rearranged speedway meeting for the Glasgow Tigers at Saracen Park.)	5–0 (Note: Match played at Stepford Football Centre, Barlanark.)	1–4
Craigmark Burntonians	7–0	1–3	—	5–2	3–1	3–2	3–1	2–3	2–2	0–3	1–3	4–0	0–2	2–0	8–2	2–0
Forth Wanderers	3–2	2–3	2–1	—	2–2	2–1	1–0	1–0	2–4	3–2	0–1	1–1	2–2	2–1	1–3	2–3
Glasgow Perthshire	3–1	2–2	2–5	0–1	—	3–1	4–2	2–2	3–2	2–1	2–3	3–1	3–2	3–2	3–2	0–3
Glasgow United	1–2	3–3	2–3	1–3	2–0	—	0–2	1–1	1–1	0–4	1–6	3–2	1–2	0–2	0–3	1–4
Glasgow University	5–0	1–2	2–5	2–1	3–2	2–0	—	2–2	2–3	0–1	1–3	3–1	0–6	1–0	2–4	1–0
Greenock Juniors	3–1	1–2	0–0	1–1	2–3	3–1	1–3	—	1–3	2–0	2–3	1–2	0–3	3–2	2–3	1–3
Kilsyth Rangers	1–3	2–1	2–2	0–3	0–1	4–3	1–2	2–2	—	4–1	2–2	3–1	1–1	1–2	0–1	1–3
Maryhill	4–1	0–2	3–2	0–1	1–2	3–0	3–2	4–2	3–3	—	1–4	0–4	3–5	2–2	0–2	1–2
Maybole Juniors	2–2	2–3	2–2	2–0	1–1	1–0	5–3	2–0	2–2	1–0	—	2–1	1–3	2–1	1–0	0–2
Muirkirk Juniors	1–0	1–7	2–5	2–1	2–2	4–2	0–0	4–1	1–2	3–2	4–5	—	3–3	3–2	3–0	3–1
Renfrew	2–1	1–1	2–1	3–1	3–0	4–3	2–0	1–1	2–1	0–4	4–1	3–0	—	4–1	1–0	3–2
St Anthony's	2–0	0–3	2–3	1–1	4–3	4–1	3–1	4–3	3–2	2–1	2–2	2–1	2–2	—	1–1	2–0
Wishaw	0–5	0–4	1–2	2–2	1–3	3–2	2–0	3–1	2–3	0–1	1–3	4–0	1–2	2–2	—	0–0
Yoker Athletic	2–4	1–3	0–1	2–2	6–1	6–0	2–1	2–0	0–1	2–4	4–2	2–2	1–1	3–1	2–3	—

Legend: Blue = home team win; Yellow = draw; Red = away team win.

== Third Division ==
The Third Division features the remaining clubs from each Conference, along with Finnart who were promoted as winners of Division Four. Vale of Clyde became champions on the penultimate weekend of the season, sealing the title with a 5–1 win at East Kilbride Thistle.

=== Stadia and locations ===
Team	Location	Home ground	Capacity	Seats	Floodlit
Ardrossan Winton Rovers	Ardrossan	Winton Park	3,000	80	Yes
Bellshill Athletic	Bellshill	Rockburn Park	500	0	No
Carluke Rovers	Carluke	John Cumming Stadium	1,500	0	Yes
Dalry Thistle	Dalry	Merksworth Park	3,000	0	No
East Kilbride Thistle	East Kilbride	The Showpark	2,300	0	No
Finnart	Springburn, Glasgow	Springburn Park	TBC	0	Yes
Girvan ^{[SFA]}	Girvan	Hamilton Park	5,000	200	No
Irvine Victoria	Irvine	Victoria Park	1,800	0	No
Kello Rovers	Kirkconnel	Nithside Park	1,700	0	No
Lanark United	Lanark	Moor Park	4,000	0	No
Larkhall Thistle	Larkhall	Gasworks Park	2,000	0	No
Lesmahagow	Lesmahagow	Craighead Park	3,500	0	No
Lugar Boswell Thistle	Lugar	Rosebank Park	2,000	0	No
Newmains United	Newmains	Victoria Park	1,000	0	No
Port Glasgow	Port Glasgow	Port Glasgow Community Stadium	2,000	0	Yes
Saltcoats Victoria	Saltcoats	Campbell Park	2,500	0	No
Royal Albert	Stonehouse	Tileworks Park	1,000	0	No
Vale of Clyde	Tollcross, Glasgow	Fullarton Park	2,500	0	No
Vale of Leven	Alexandria	Millburn Park	3,000	0	No

Location of teams in 2022–23 West of Scotland League Third Division

=== League table ===
Pos	Team	Pld	W	D	L	GF	GA	GD	Pts	Promotion or relegation
1	Vale of Clyde (C, P)	36	29	3	4	130	35	+95	90	Promotion to the Second Division
2	Larkhall Thistle (P)	36	25	6	5	95	43	+52	81	Promotion to the Second Division
3	Ardrossan Winton Rovers (P)	36	25	3	8	121	51	+70	78	Promotion to the Second Division
4	Irvine Victoria	36	24	5	7	100	45	+55	77	
5	Lesmahagow	36	24	3	9	93	59	+34	75	
6	Lanark United	36	24	2	10	99	60	+39	74	
7	Bellshill Athletic (Note: Bellshill Athletic deducted 3 points for fielding an ineligible player.)	36	18	6	12	69	54	+15	57	
8	Kello Rovers	36	15	7	14	58	50	+8	52	
9	Finnart	36	15	7	14	65	60	+5	52	
10	Girvan	36	13	9	14	62	80	−18	48	
11	Port Glasgow	36	15	2	19	74	76	−2	47	
12	Vale of Leven	36	12	8	16	57	59	−2	44	
13	Dalry Thistle (Note: Dalry Thistle deducted 3 points for playing too many trialists in their 1–3 defeat to Lanark United.)	36	14	5	17	49	63	−14	44	
14	Lugar Boswell Thistle (R)	36	11	6	19	59	76	−17	39	Relegation to the Fourth Division
15	East Kilbride Thistle (R)	36	9	9	18	60	105	−45	36	Relegation to the Fourth Division
16	Carluke Rovers (R)	36	9	3	24	62	113	−51	30	Relegation to the Fourth Division
17	Newmains United (Note: Newmains United deducted 3 points for playing too many trialists in a game.) (R)	36	5	6	25	36	101	−65	18	Relegation to the Fourth Division
18	Royal Albert (R)	36	3	3	30	38	113	−75	12	Relegation to the Fourth Division
19	Saltcoats Victoria (Note: Saltcoats Victoria deducted 3 points for fielding an ineligible player.) (R)	36	3	5	28	36	120	−84	11	Relegation to the Fourth Division

Source: West of Scotland Football League
Rules for classification: 1) Points; 2) Goal difference; 3) Goals scored
(C) Champions; (P) Promoted; (R) Relegated

=== Results ===
Home \ Away	AWR	BEL	CAR	DAL	EKT	FIN	GIR	IRV	KEL	LAN	LAR	LES	LBT	NUC	PGL	ROA	SAL	VOC	VOL
Ardrossan Winton Rovers	—	2–0	2–1	1–2	6–3	1–0	5–0	1–2	2–3	4–0	3–3	3–1	2–4	8–1	5–0	6–1	11–2	1–3	1–0
Bellshill Athletic	2–1	—	4–0	1–0	2–1	1–0	2–3	2–3	1–3	2–3	1–0	1–6	0–0	3–1	5–3	1–0	2–0	3–3	2–1
Carluke Rovers	2–5	1–3	—	0–1	4–4	3–0	3–4	1–4	3–1	1–4	2–4	3–2	2–1	4–4	2–5	3–2	5–1	0–5	1–3
Dalry Thistle	2–1	1–4	1–3	—	1–0	1–1	1–0	0–0	0–3	2–3	1–1	0–1	1–1	4–0	2–1	4–1	4–0 (Note: Match played at Synergy Arena, Kilmarnock.)	2–4	2–2
East Kilbride Thistle	2–2	0–3	2–0	4–2	—	3–2	2–2	2–4	0–0	0–7	1–6	1–3	0–4	2–2	0–4	3–2	4–3	1–5	0–3
Finnart	1–5	2–2 (Note: Match played at Stepford Football Centre, Barlanark.)	3–1	4–2	2–2 (Note: Match played at Stepford Football Centre, Barlanark.)	—	5–1	1–0	2–1	1–1	1–1 (Note: Match played at Greenfield Park, Shettleston.)	0–2	2–2	3–0	0–3 (Note: Match awarded to Port Glasgow, as Finnart were unable to find a suitable venue.)	5–1	2–1	1–3	2–2
Girvan	0–3	3–3	2–2	0–1	3–3	1–0	—	0–3	3–1	1–2	2–2	2–1	1–0	2–4	3–3	3–1	4–0	0–6	2–1
Irvine Victoria	4–3	1–2	5–0	4–0	6–0	1–0	5–0	—	1–1	3–3	2–3	8–0	6–0	4–0	2–1	2–0	5–1	2–2	0–3
Kello Rovers	0–4	1–1	5–1	3–0	4–5	0–1	2–2	2–3	—	2–0	0–1	2–2	1–0	5–0	2–0	3–2	2–0	2–3	0–2
Lanark United	0–3	2–1	2–3	3–1	4–1	1–4	4–2	0–4	2–0	—	3–6	2–0	1–0	3–0	6–1	4–1	2–1	1–0	3–1
Larkhall Thistle	2–3	0–0	4–0	4–0	6–1	2–1	2–0	5–0	2–1	2–1	—	5–4	2–0	0–0	4–3	2–0	5–1	3–1	4–1
Lesmahagow Juniors	3–3	3–1	3–0	5–2	3–0	3–2	1–1	3–0	1–0	3–2	1–0	—	3–0	4–0	2–4	4–0	3–0	0–2	5–0
Lugar Boswell Thistle	2–4	4–6	4–3	1–0	1–1	2–5	2–0	1–3	1–2	4–6	2–1	0–3	—	4–0	1–2	2–1	3–0	0–6	1–1
Newmains United	0–2	1–0	3–1	0–1	2–2	0–2	0–3	1–2	1–1	0–2	1–3	3–4	0–2	—	0–2	1–1	4–1	0–6	1–2
Port Glasgow Juniors	0–1	2–1	4–1	3–0	4–1	1–2	1–2	1–3	0–1	1–7	0–2	2–3	3–2	4–2	—	4–1	1–2	0–1	2–0
Royal Albert	1–7	1–4	2–0	1–2	1–2	1–3 (Note: Match played at Craighead Park, Lesmahagow.)	0–3	0–2	0–0	1–4	2–3	1–3	2–6	3–1	1–4	—	3–3	1–6	0–4
Saltcoats Victoria	1–5	0–3	1–4	0–3	1–5	1–3	1–6	2–2	1–3	1–7	1–2	2–4	2–0	0–1	2–1	0–2	—	2–2	2–2
Vale of Clyde	2–3	1–0	9–1	2–1	1–0	5–0	7–0	2–1	3–0	2–1	2–3	5–1	4–2	7–1	4–1	5–0	5–0	—	2–1
Vale of Leven	1–2	1–0	4–1	1–2	0–2	3–2	1–1	2–3	0–1	1–3	1–0	2–3	0–0	4–1	3–3	4–1	0–0	0–4	—

Legend: Blue = home team win; Yellow = draw; Red = away team win.

== Fourth Division ==
The Fourth Division contains the remaining six clubs from Division Four, as well as six new teams, including Threave Rovers who have switched from the South of Scotland League.

=== Stadia and locations ===
Team	Location	Home ground	Capacity	Seats	Floodlit
BSC Glasgow	Yoker, Glasgow	Peterson Park	500	0	No
Campbeltown Pupils	Campbeltown	Kintyre Park	TBC	0	No
Easterhouse Academy	Glasgow	Stepford Park			Yes
Eglinton	Kilwinning	Kilwinning Sports Grounds	TBC	TBC	TBC
Glenvale	Paisley	Ferguslie Sports Centre	TBC	0	Yes
Harmony Row	Shieldhall, Glasgow	McKenna Park (Note: Harmony Row are ground-sharing with St Anthony's at McKenna Park.)	1,000	0	No
Kilsyth Athletic	Kilsyth	Kilsyth Sports Field	TBC	0	No
Rossvale Academy	Bishopbriggs	Huntershill	500	0	Yes
St. Peter's	Renfrew	New Western Park (Note: St. Peter's are ground-sharing with Renfrew at New Western Park.)	1,000	0	Yes
Thorn Athletic	Johnstone	Thorn Park			
Threave Rovers ^{[SFA]}	Castle Douglas	Meadow Park	1,500	TBC	Yes
West Park United	Bishopbriggs	Huntershill	500	0	Yes

Notes

Location of teams in 2022–23 West of Scotland League Fourth Division
Location of teams in 2022–23 West of Scotland League Fourth Division in the Glasgow area

=== League table ===
Pos	Team	Pld	W	D	L	GF	GA	GD	Pts	Promotion or qualification
1	West Park United (Note: West Park United deducted 3 points.) (C, P)	22	20	0	2	73	20	+53	57	Promotion to the Third Division
2	Kilsyth Athletic (P)	22	18	2	2	68	30	+38	56	Promotion to the Third Division
3	Threave Rovers (P)	22	18	0	4	82	23	+59	54	Promotion to the Third Division
4	St. Peter's	22	15	1	6	55	29	+26	46	
5	Thorn Athletic	22	10	4	8	42	40	+2	34	
6	BSC Glasgow	22	8	1	13	34	52	−18	25	
7	Easterhouse Academy	22	7	3	12	31	48	−17	24	
8	Rossvale Academy	22	8	0	14	39	67	−28	24	
9	Eglinton	22	7	0	15	39	63	−24	21	
10	Glenvale	22	5	1	16	39	59	−20	16	
11	Campbeltown Pupils	22	3	3	16	23	58	−35	12	
12	Harmony Row (Note: Harmony Row deducted 3 points.)	22	4	3	15	24	60	−36	12	

Source: West of Scotland Football League
Rules for classification: 1) Points; 2) Goal difference; 3) Goals scored
(C) Champions; (P) Promoted

=== Results ===
Home \ Away	BSC	CAM	EAS	EGL	GLE	HRW	KIL	ROS	STP	THO	THR	WPU
BSC Glasgow	—	3–1	3–1	1–2	2–1	0–1	3–5	2–1	3–0	0–6	1–5	2–3
Campbeltown Pupils	1–2	—	0–1	3–1	1–0	0–0	2–3	1–4	0–3	3–0 (Note: Match awarded to Campbeltown Pupils, as Thorn Athletic were unable to field a team.)	2–4	0–3
Easterhouse Academy	1–1	1–1	—	0–6	3–1	2–0	1–3	3–1	1–6	0–2	4–0	0–2
Eglinton	0–2	4–0	2–1	—	4–3	3–4	1–2	2–1	1–5	1–3	1–6	1–4
Glenvale	3–1	6–0	2–1	2–1	—	0–0	0–1	4–7	1–5	1–4	1–5	0–2
Harmony Row	0–2	1–1	2–4	3–2	3–6 (Note: Match played at St Ninian's High School, Giffnock.)	—	0–4	0–2	2–5	1–2	1–2	0–2
Kilsyth Athletic	3–1	3–2	5–1	6–0	3–1	6–2	—	6–0	3–1	2–2	1–2	3–2
Rossvale Academy	4–0	3–2	0–2	4–2	2–0	1–4	2–3	—	0–2	1–3	0–9	0–3
St Peters	2–1	1–0	3–1	2–1	3–2	8–0	1–2	3–0	—	1–1 (Note: Match played at New Tinto Park, Drumoyne.)	2–1	1–2
Thorn Athletic	4–3	3–0 (Note: Match played at Ferguslie Sports Centre, Paisley.)	3–3 (Note: Match played at Ferguslie Sports Centre, Paisley.)	1–3 (Note: Match played at New Western Park, Renfrew.)	1–0	1–0	1–1	3–4	0–1 (Note: Match played at Keanie Park.)	—	0–4 (Note: Match played at James McGrory Park, Royston.)	1–7
Threave Rovers	5–1 (Note: Match played at North West Community Campus, Dumfries.)	4–0	3–0 (Note: Match played at Raydale Park, Gretna.)	3–0	7–3	2–0	1–3	9–1 (Note: Match played at Palmerston Park, Dumfries.)	4–0 (Note: Match played at Palmerston Park, Dumfries.)	2–0 (Note: Match played at Raydale Park, Gretna.)	—	3–0
West Park United	3–0	8–3	2–0	7–1	3–2	5–0	4–0	4–1	3–0	2–1	2–1	—

Legend: Blue = home team win; Yellow = draw; Red = away team win.

== Notes ==
^{SFA} Club with an SFA licence; eligible to participate in the Lowland League promotion play-off should they win the Premier Division and take part in the Scottish Cup.
