= SJFA West Region League Two =

- Founded: 2018
- Folded: 2020
- Country: Scotland
- Number of clubs: 15
- Level on pyramid: 4
- Promotion to: West League One
- Domestic cup(s): Scottish Junior Cup
- Last champions: Johnstone Burgh (1st title) (2019–20)
- Most championships: Johnstone Burgh and Lanark United (1 each)

The SJFA West Region League Two (also known as the McBookie.com West of Scotland League Two) is a Scottish semi-professional football competition run by the West Region of the Scottish Junior Football Association and is the fourth tier of league competition for its member clubs. The league was created when West Region clubs voted in 2017 to organise all leagues on a regionwide basis, with the Central First and Second Divisions and the Ayrshire Division merging and their teams separated into two tiers. Clubs will be promoted to a new regionwide League One.

The competition was abolished in 2020 when all SJFA West Region clubs moved to join the newly formed senior West of Scotland Football League.

== Final member clubs for the 2019–20 season ==
Club	Location	Home Ground	Finishing position 2018–19
Annbank United	Annbank	New Pebble Park	11th
Ardeer Thistle	Stevenston	Ardeer Stadium	15th
Ashfield	Possilpark, Glasgow	Saracen Park	5th
Forth Wanderers	Forth	Kingshill Park	12th
Johnstone Burgh	Johnstone	Keanie Park	10th
Lugar Boswell Thistle	Lugar	Rosebank Park	16th in League One
Maybole	Maybole	Ladywell Stadium	15th in League One
Muirkirk	Muirkirk	Burnside Park	9th
Newmains United	Newmains	Victoria Park	14th
Saltcoats Victoria	Saltcoats	Campbell Park	13th
St Anthony's	Cardonald, Glasgow	McKenna Park	8th
Thorniewood United	Viewpark	Robertson Park	7th
Vale of Clyde	Tollcross, Glasgow	Fullarton Park	4th
Vale of Leven	Alexandria	Millburn Park	6th
Yoker Athletic	Yoker, Glasgow	Holm Park, Clydebank	14th in League One

== Season summaries ==
Season	Champions	Also promoted
2018–19	Lanark United	Lesmahagow, Carluke Rovers
2019–20 (Note: Season suspended in March 2020 due to the coronavirus pandemic. Champions calculated using 'points per game' algorithm, announced on 21 April.)	Johnstone Burgh	No promotion or relegation: all SJFA West teams moved to the Senior West of Scotland Football League.
