= SJFA West Region Championship =

Football league in Scotland

- Founded: 2002 (24 years ago)
- Folded: 2020
- Country: Scotland
- Number of clubs: 16
- Level on pyramid: 2
- Promotion to: West Region Premiership
- Relegation to: West League One
- Domestic cup: Scottish Junior Cup
- Last champions: Blantyre Victoria and Darvel (1st titles; shared) (2019–20)
- Most championships: Rutherglen Glencairn (2 titles)

The SJFA West Region Championship (known as the McBookie.com West Region Championship for sponsorship reasons) was a Scottish semi-professional football competition run by the West Region of the Scottish Junior Football Association and was the second tier of league competition for its member clubs.

Formerly known as the West of Scotland Super League First Division, the league began in 2002 when top sides from the former Ayrshire and Central Regions agreed to form two combined Super League divisions above the regional competitions. Originally comprising twelve clubs, it was expanded to fourteen after two years as promotion/relegation places were increased.

West Region clubs voted in 2017 to organise all leagues on a regionwide basis and as a result, the second tier Super League First Division was rebranded as the Championship from 2018 onwards and latterly consisted of sixteen clubs. Clubs were promoted to a rebranded Premiership and relegated to a regionwide League One instead of the previous Central and Ayrshire district divisions.

The competition was abolished in 2020 when all SJFA West Region clubs moved to join the newly formed senior West of Scotland Football League.

== Final member clubs for the 2019–20 season ==
Club	Location	Home Ground	Finishing position 2018–19
Arthurlie	Barrhead	Dunterlie Park	5th
Blantyre Victoria	Blantyre	KG Stadium	3rd in League One
Cambuslang Rangers	Cambuslang	Somervell Park	16th in Premiership
Craigmark Burntonians	Dalmellington	Station Park	13th
Cumbernauld United	Cumbernauld	Guy's Meadow	4th
Dalry Thistle	Dalry	Merksworth Park	11th
Darvel Juniors	Darvel	Recreation Park	7th
Gartcairn Juniors	Airdrie	MTC Park	1st in League One
Irvine Victoria	Irvine	Victoria Park	12th
Kilsyth Rangers	Kilsyth	Duncansfield Park	6th
Neilston Juniors	Neilston	Brig O' Lea Stadium	8th
Petershill	Springburn, Glasgow	Petershill Park	15th in Premiership
Renfrew	Renfrew	New Western Park	14th in Premiership
Shotts Bon Accord	Shotts	Hannah Park	2nd in League One
St Roch's	Royston, Glasgow	James McGrory Park	10th
Whitletts Victoria	Ayr	Dam Park	9th

== Season summaries ==
Season	Champions	Also promoted	Relegated
2002–03	Arthurlie	Troon	Cambuslang Rangers, Largs Thistle
2003–04	Bellshill Athletic	Renfrew	Benburb, Shettleston
2004–05	Kilsyth Rangers	Shotts Bon Accord	Irvine Meadow, Kilbirnie Ladeside, Cumbernauld United, Saltcoats Victoria
2005–06	Neilston Juniors	Petershill	Kirkintilloch Rob Roy, Maybole, Dunipace, Cambuslang Rangers
2006–07	Irvine Meadow	Beith Juniors	Hurlford United, Larkhall Thistle, Lugar Boswell Thistle, Girvan
2007–08	Kirkintilloch Rob Roy	Vale of Clyde	Maryhill, Troon, Lesmahagow, Johnstone Burgh
2008–09	Largs Thistle	Kilbirnie Ladeside, Lanark United	Port Glasgow, Shotts Bon Accord, Kilwinning Rangers, Hurlford United
2009–10	Rutherglen Glencairn	Cumnock Juniors	Dalry Thistle, Maybole, Kilsyth Rangers, Neilston Juniors
2010–11	Ashfield	Clydebank	Kilwinning Rangers, Bellshill Athletic, Vale of Clyde, Annbank United
2011–12	Glenafton Athletic	Shotts Bon Accord	East Kilbride Thistle, Lanark United, Girvan, Dalry Thistle
2012–13	Hurlford United	Kilbirnie Ladeside, Largs Thistle	Whitletts Victoria, Ardrossan Winton Rovers, Kello Rovers, Glasgow Perthshire
2013–14	Troon	Beith Juniors, Shotts Bon Accord	Lesmahagow, Kilwinning Rangers, Renfrew, Ashfield
2014–15	Pollok	Shettleston, Kirkintilloch Rob Roy	Irvine Victoria, Neilston Juniors, Ardeer Thistle, Thorniewood United
2015–16	Cumnock Juniors	Largs Thistle, Kilwinning Rangers	Greenock Juniors, Ardrossan Winton Rovers, Bellshill Athletic, Maybole
2016–17	Girvan	Clydebank	Yoker Athletic, Shotts Bon Accord, Blantyre Victoria, Irvine Victoria
2017–18	Petershill	Cambuslang Rangers, Largs Thistle, Renfrew, Irvine Meadow, Troon	Maryhill, Shettleston
2018–19	Rutherglen Glencairn (2)	Benburb, Rossvale	Girvan, Kello Rovers, Larkhall Thistle
2019–20 (Note: Season suspended in March 2020 due to the coronavirus pandemic. Champions calculated using 'points per game' algorithm, announced on 21 April.)	Blantyre Victoria / Darvel (shared)	No promotion or relegation: all SJFA West teams moved to the Senior West of Scotland Football League.	
