= SJFA West Region League One =

- Founded: 2018
- Folded: 2020
- Country: Scotland
- Number of clubs: 16
- Level on pyramid: 3
- Promotion to: West Championship
- Relegation to: West League Two
- Domestic cup(s): Scottish Junior Cup
- Last champions: Shettleston (1st title) (2019–20)
- Most championships: Shettleston and Gartcairn Juniors (1 each)

The SJFA West Region League One (also known as the McBookie.com West Region League One for sponsorship reasons) was a Scottish semi-professional football competition run by the West Region of the Scottish Junior Football Association and was the third tier of league competition for its member clubs.

The league began in 2018, when West Region clubs voted in 2017 to organise all leagues on a regionwide basis and as a result the third tier leagues Ayrshire District League and Central District League First Division merged to form a sixteen team League One. Clubs were promoted to a rebranded Championship and relegated to a regionwide League Two.

The competition was abolished in 2020 when all SJFA West Region clubs moved to join the newly formed senior West of Scotland Football League.

== Final member clubs for the 2019–20 season ==
Club	Location	Home Ground	Finishing position 2018–19
Ardrossan Winton Rovers	Ardrossan	Winton Park	4th
Bellshill Athletic	Bellshill	Rockburn Park	7th
Carluke Rovers	Carluke	John Cumming Stadium	3rd in League Two
East Kilbride Thistle	East Kilbride	The Showpark	8th
Girvan	Girvan	Hamilton Park	14th in Championship
Glasgow Perthshire	Possilpark, Glasgow	Keppoch Park	9th
Greenock Juniors	Greenock	Ravenscraig Stadium	5th
Kello Rovers	Kirkconnel	Nithside Park	15th in Championship
Lanark United	Lanark	Moor Park	1st in League Two
Larkhall Thistle	Larkhall	Gasworks Park	16th in Championship
Lesmahagow	Lesmahagow	Craighead Park	2nd in League Two
Maryhill	Maryhill, Glasgow	Lochburn Park	12th
Port Glasgow	Port Glasgow	Parklea Community Stadium	6th
Royal Albert	Stonehouse	Tilework Park	10th
Shettleston	Shettleston, Glasgow	Greenfield Park	13th
Wishaw Juniors	Wishaw	Beltane Park	11th

== Season summaries ==
Season	Champions	Also promoted	Relegated
2018–19	Gartcairn	Shotts Bon Accord, Blantyre Victoria	Yoker Athletic, Maybole, Lugar Boswell Thistle
2019–20 (Note: Season suspended in March 2020 due to the coronavirus pandemic. Champions calculated using 'points per game' algorithm, announced on 21 April.)	Shettleston	No promotion or relegation: all SJFA West teams moved to the Senior West of Scotland Football League.	
