= SJFA West Region Central District Second Division =

- Founded: 2002 (23 years ago)
- Folded: 2018
- Country: Scotland
- Number of clubs: 12
- Promotion to: Central District First Division
- Relegation to: none
- Domestic cup(s): Scottish Junior Cup
- Last champions: Royal Albert F.C. (2017–18)
- Website: SJFA

The Scottish Junior Football Central District Second Division was fourth-tier division of the West Region of the Scottish Junior Football Association.

The three highest-placed teams at the end of the season were promoted to the Central District First Division.

In 2018, the lower leagues in the West Region were reorganised, no longer being split geographically, with the result that the Central First and Second Divisions and the Ayrshire Division merged and were separated into two tiers (League One and League Two).

== Member clubs for the 2016–17 season ==
Club	Location	Home Ground	Finishing position 2015–16
Ashfield	Possilpark, Glasgow	Saracen Park	11th
Carluke Rovers	Carluke	John Cumming Stadium	Central District First Division, 12th
Dunipace Juniors	Denny	Westfield Park	Central District First Division, 14th
East Kilbride Thistle	East Kilbride	The Showpark	7th
Gartcairn Juniors	Airdrie	MTC Park	5th
Glasgow Perthshire	Possilpark, Glasgow	Keppoch Park	8th
Lanark United	Lanark	Moor Park	6th
Newmains United	Newmains	Victoria Park	9th
Port Glasgow	Port Glasgow	Parklea Community Stadium	4th
Royal Albert	Stonehouse	Tilework Park	12th
St. Anthony's	Cardonald, Glasgow	McKenna Park	Central District First Division, 13th
Vale of Leven	Alexandria	Millburn Park	10th

== Season summaries ==
Season	Champions	Also promoted
2002–03	St Anthony's	Port Glasgow, Dunipace Juniors
2003–04	Clydebank	Carluke Rovers, Yoker Athletic
2004–05	Lanark United	Thorniewood United, Lesmahagow
2005–06	Blantyre Victoria	Port Glasgow, Glasgow Perthshire
2006–07	Ashfield	St Roch's, Benburb
2007–08	Vale of Leven	Thorniewood United, Cambuslang Rangers
2008–09	Blantyre Victoria	Dunipace Juniors, Glasgow Perthshire
2009–10	Johnstone Burgh	Shettleston, Greenock Juniors
2010–11	Yoker Athletic	Larkhall Thistle, Benburb
2011–12 ^{1}	Carluke Rovers	St Roch's, Lesmahagow
2012–13	Cambuslang Rangers	Maryhill, Johnstone Burgh
2013–14	Blantyre Victoria	Vale of Clyde, Wishaw Juniors
2014–15	Rossvale	Johnstone Burgh, St. Roch's
2015–16	Forth Wanderers	Benburb, Cambuslang Rangers
2016–17	Glasgow Perthshire	Port Glasgow, East Kilbride Thistle
2017–18	Royal Albert	Gartcairn Juniors, Bellshill Athletic

^{1} Stonehouse Violet folded on 11 January 2012 and withdrew from the league. Their playing record was expunged.
