= Maurice George =

Scottish association football player

Personal information
- Date of birth: 16 November 1977 (age 48)
- Place of birth: Alexandria, Scotland
- Position: Midfielder

Senior career*
Years	Team	Apps	(Gls)
1996–1999	Greenock Morton	6	(0)
1996–1997	Beith Juniors (loan)		
1999–2000	Beith Juniors		
- Irvine Meadow
2004–2005	Vale of Leven		
Total		6	(0)

Managerial career
- 2018–: Yoker Athletic
- * Club domestic league appearances and goals as of 10:25, 15 October 2018 (UTC)

Maurice George (born 16 November 1977) is a Scottish former professional footballer who has played in the Scottish Football League First Division for Greenock Morton. He is the manager of Yoker Athletic in the Scottish Junior Football Association, West Region.
