= SJFA West Region Central District First Division =

- Founded: 2002 (23 years ago)
- Folded: 2018
- Country: Scotland
- Number of clubs: 14
- Promotion to: Super League First Division
- Relegation to: Central District Second Division
- Domestic cup(s): Scottish Junior Cup
- Last champions: Rossvale F.C. (2017–18)
- Website: SJFA

The Central District League First Division was the third-tier division of the West Region of the Scottish Junior Football Association. The two highest-placed teams at the end of the season were promoted to the Super League, First Division. The three lowest-placed teams were relegated to Central District Second Division.

It sat below region-wide division and alongside an 'Ayrshire' geographical equivalent (with one division), representing the Ayrshire League and Central League which merged to form the West Region.

In 2018, the lower leagues in the West Region were reorganised, no longer being split geographically, with the result that the Central First and Second Divisions and the Ayrshire Division merged and were separated into two tiers (League One and League Two).

== Member clubs for the 2016–17 season ==
Club	Location	Home Ground	Finishing position 2015–16
Bellshill Athletic	Bellshill	Rockburn Park	Super League First Division, 13th
Benburb	Govan, Glasgow	New Tinto Park	Central District Second Division, 2nd
Cambuslang Rangers	Cambuslang	Somervell Park	Central District Second Division, 3rd
Forth Wanderers	Forth	Kingshill Park	Central District Second Division, 1st
Greenock Juniors	Greenock	Ravenscraig Stadium	Super League First Division, 11th
Johnstone Burgh	Johnstone	Keanie Park	7th
Larkhall Thistle	Larkhall	Gasworks Park	6th
Lesmahagow	Lesmahagow	Craighead Park	9th
Neilston Juniors	Neilston	Brig O'Lea Stadium	11th
Rossvale	Springburn, Glasgow	Petershill Park^{1}	4th
St. Roch's	Provanmill, Glasgow	James McGrory Park	5th
Thorniewood United	Viewpark	Robertson Park	10th
Vale of Clyde	Tollcross, Glasgow	Fullarton Park	8th
Wishaw Juniors	Wishaw	Beltane Park	3rd

^{1} Groundsharing with Petershill

== Season summaries ==
Season	Champions	Also promoted	Relegated
2002–03	Kilsyth Rangers	N/A	St Roch's, Lesmahagow, Blantyre Victoria
2003–04	Cambuslang Rangers	Kirkintilloch Rob Roy	Port Glasgow, Lanark United, Glasgow Perthshire
2004–05	Vale of Clyde	Dunipace Juniors	Benburb, Carluke Rovers
2005–06	Lesmahagow	East Kilbride Thistle	Greenock Juniors, Thorniewood United, Shettleston
2006–07	Kirkintilloch Rob Roy	Clydebank	Cambuslang Rangers, Vale of Leven, Glasgow Perthshire
2007–08	Port Glasgow	Lanark United	Blantyre Victoria, Dunipace Juniors, St Roch's
2008–09	Rutherglen Glencairn	Ashfield	Yoker Athletic, Benburb, Johnstone Burgh
2009–10	Cumbernauld United	Shotts Bon Accord	Lesmahagow, Larkhall Thistle, Maryhill
2010–11	Kilsyth Rangers	Thorniewood United	Johnstone Burgh, Blantyre Victoria
2011–12	Glasgow Perthshire	Yoker Athletic	Cambuslang Rangers, Vale of Leven, Vale of Clyde
2012–13	Greenock Juniors	Lesmahagow	East Kilbride Thistle, St Roch's, Port Glasgow
2013–14	Neilston Juniors	Shettleston	Glasgow Perthshire, Johnstone Burgh, Cambuslang Rangers
2014–15	Blantyre Victoria	Bellshill Athletic	Benburb, Lanark United, Ashfield
2015–16	Renfrew	Maryhill	Carluke Rovers, St Anthony's, Dunipace Juniors
2016–17	Cambuslang Rangers	Larkhall Thistle	Vale of Clyde, Bellshill Athletic, Johnstone Burgh
2017–18	Rossvale	St Roch's, Benburb, Neilston Juniors	Forth Wanderers, Thorniewood United, Lesmahagow
