= SJFA West Region Ayrshire District =

- Founded: 2002 (23 years ago)
- Folded: 2018
- Country: Scotland
- Number of clubs: 12
- Promotion to: Super League First Division
- Relegation to: none
- Domestic cup(s): Scottish Junior Cup
- Last champions: Dalry Thistle (2017–18)
- Website: SJFA

The Scottish Junior Football Ayrshire Division One (also known as the Ayrshire District League) was the third-tier division of the West Region of the Scottish Junior Football Association. The two highest-placed teams at the end of the season were promoted to the Super League First Division.

It sat below two region-wide divisions and alongside a 'Central' geographical equivalent (with two divisions) representing the Ayrshire League and Central League which merged to form the West Region.

In 2018, the lower leagues in the region were reorganised, no longer being split geographically, with the result that the Central First and Second Divisions and the Ayrshire Division merged and were separated into two tiers (League One and League Two).

== Member clubs for the 2016–17 season ==
Club	Location	Home Ground	Finishing position 2015–16
Annbank United	Annbank	New Pebble Park	9th
Ardeer Thistle	Stevenston	Ardeer Stadium	11th
Ardrossan Winton Rovers	Ardrossan	Winton Park	Super League First Division, 12th
Craigmark Burntonians	Dalmellington	Station Park	7th
Dalry Thistle	Dalry	Merksworth Park	8th
Darvel	Darvel	Recreation Park	3rd
Kello Rovers	Kirkconnel	Nithside Park	6th
Lugar Boswell Thistle	Lugar	Rosebank Park	5th
Maybole	Maybole	Ladywell Stadium	Super League First Division, 14th
Muirkirk	Muirkirk	Burnside Park	10th
Saltcoats Victoria	Saltcoats	Campbell Park	12th
Whitletts Victoria	Ayr	Dam Park	4th

== Season summaries ==
Season	Champions	Also promoted
2002–03	Lugar Boswell Thistle	N/A
2003–04	Maybole	Saltcoats Victoria
2004–05	Largs Thistle	Annbank United
2005–06	Irvine Meadow	Girvan
2006–07	Kilbirnie Ladeside	Maybole
2007–08	Hurlford United	Girvan
2008–09	Dalry Thistle	Whitletts Victoria
2009–10	Hurlford United	Kilwinning Rangers
2010–11	Ardrossan Winton Rovers	Dalry Thistle
2011–12	Maybole	Kello Rovers
2012–13	Kilwinning Rangers	Troon
2013–14	Irvine Victoria	Ardeer Thistle
2014–15	Ardrossan Winton Rovers	Kilwinning Rangers
2015–16	Girvan	Irvine Victoria
2016–17	Darvel	Kello Rovers
2017–18	Dalry Thistle	Irvine Victoria
