= Peter Leonard (footballer) =

Scottish footballer

Personal information
- Position: Forward

Youth career
- Johnstone United

Senior career*
Years	Team	Apps	(Gls)
1975–1979	St Mirren	17	(3)
1978–1979	→ Motherwell (loan)	6	(0)
- Irvine Meadow
Total		23	(3)

Managerial career
- –2014: Maybole Juniors
- 2015–2017: Girvan
- 2017–2018: Cumnock Juniors
- 2019: Whitletts Victoria
- * Club domestic league appearances and goals

Peter Leonard, is a Scottish former footballer who played as a forward for St Mirren and Motherwell in the Scottish Football League Premier Division and current manager.

== Career ==
Having previously managed fellow Ayrshire clubs, Maybole and Girvan, Leonard took charge of Cumnock Juniors in October 2017. Following a 7-1 defeat, Leonard was fired in December 2018.

On 25 January 2019, Leonard was appointed manager of Whitletts Victoria. Following a poor start to the 2019-20 season, Leonard resigned by mutual agreement on 27 October 2019.
