= Glasgow University F.C. =

Association football club in Glasgow City, Scotland

Glasgow University
- Full name: Glasgow University Football Club
- Founded: 1877
- Ground: Excelsior Stadium, Airdrie
- Capacity: 10,101 (all seated)
- Coordinates: 55°51′36″N 3°57′36″W
- Chairman: Donnie Ferguson
- Manager: James Macaulay
- League: West of Scotland League Second Division
- 2025–26: West of Scotland League Third Division, 4th of 16 (promoted)
Home colours

Glasgow University Football Club are a Scottish football team that represents the University of Glasgow. The club was founded at a meeting of students "dissatisfied that the Rugby game alone has been played at College" on 7 December 1877, under the captaincy of Arthur Mechan.

Having played previously in the Caledonian Amateur Football League, from the 2020–21 season, their first team play in the newly formed West of Scotland Football League.

They are based at the Garscube Sports Complex in Glasgow, The first team play at Excelsior Stadium in Airdrie, which they share with Airdrieonians.

They can participate in the Scottish Cup, as they are members of the Scottish Football Association. They lost in the first round to Brechin City in 2004–05, Buckie Thistle in 2007–08. and Vale of Leithen in 2008–09. Their participation in the 2004–05 competition was their first since 1995, when they lost 1–0 to Spartans in the first round. They also qualified for the 1975–76 competition, losing to Albion Rovers in a second round replay. Previously, on 28 January 1960, Glasgow University were routed 15–0 by Cup-holders St Mirren at their Love Street ground in a first-round tie, American-born striker Gerry Baker scoring ten of the goals.

The 2010–11 competition saw Glasgow University qualify for the Scottish Cup second round for the first time since their 1975–76 defeat to Albion Rovers, after a 1–0 victory at Garscube Sports Complex against Burntisland Shipyard. In season 2015–16, Glasgow University were drawn away to Lowland League side Cumbernauld Colts in the first round of the competition, with Cumbernauld Colts winning 3–0 in front of a healthy crowd at Broadwood Stadium. In the 2016–17 competition, Glasgow University lost 8–2 to Junior champions Bonnyrigg Rose in a home tie staged at the Excelsior Stadium in Airdrie.

University player William Beveridge made three international appearances for Scotland from 1879 to 1880.

In addition to its main teams which are for current students of the university, there is also a club for graduates, Westerlands AFC, (founded in 1967 named after the institution's former sports grounds in Anniesland), who also play at Garscube and compete in the Caledonian AFL along with the Glasgow students' team.

== Honours ==
- Scottish Qualifying Cup South (2):

1967–68, 1969–70

- Scottish Amateur Cup (1):

1926–27

- West of Scotland Amateur Cup (1):

1931–32

- Queen's Park Shield (20):

1924, 1927, 1936, 1939, 1940, 1944, 1945, 1952, 1954, 1956, 1960, 1961, 1964, 1965, 1968, 1971, 1972, 1973, 1991
