= Beith Juniors F.C. =

Association football club in Scotland

Beith Juniors
- Full name: Beith Juniors Football Club
- Nicknames: The Mighty, The Cabes
- Founded: 1938
- Ground: Bellsdale Park, Beith
- Capacity: 2,200
- Coordinates: 55.750674°N 4.636051°W
- Chairman: Gordon Irving
- Manager: John Hughes
- League: Lowland League West
- 2025–26: West of Scotland League Premier Division, 11th of 16 (promoted)
- Website: https://www.beithjuniors.com/
Home colours	Away colours

Beith Juniors Football Club are a Scottish football club from the town of Beith, North Ayrshire. Members of the Scottish Junior Football Association, they compete in the West of Scotland Football League. Beith play at Bellsdale Park. Their main rival is Kilbirnie Ladeside.

== History ==
Formed in 1938, they play in black and white strips (uniforms) and their nicknames are the Cabes or the Mighty. They were formed as a junior football successor to the disbanded senior side Beith, who had previously competed in the Scottish Football League.

In the club's first season in 1939–40 they reached the District Cup Final and finished as runners up and then the second world war stopped football. In the 1940s the club were mostly a mid table club and reached the Ayrshire Cup final in 1948–49 but again finished as runners up. It was not until 1954–55 that the club enjoyed cup success with the Ayrshire Cup and finished as league runners up the same season. There were 3 more finals in the decade, losing the District Cup in 1955–56 and the West of Scotland Cup in 1957–58 but won the West League Cup in 1956–57.

The 1960s started with the club winning the District Cup and then North Ayrshire league success in 1962–63, 1963–64, 1964–65, 1966–67, 1968–69 with the Ayrshire League being won in 1964–65 and 1968–69 as playoffs with the South Ayrshire champions. The club won two West of Scotland Cups in 1965–66 and 1966–67 after being runners up in 1964–65. The club embarked on an unbeaten 3 match tour of the Netherlands.

A relatively barren spell in the 1970s followed with an Ayrshire Cup win in 1977–78 and with runner up finishes in the Ayrshire League in 1978–79, North Ayrshire League in 1969–70, 1974–75 and 1975–76 and in District Cup in 1971–72, Supplementary Cup in 1974–75 and the League Cup in 1979–80.

The club won the League Cup in 1981–82, followed by relegation to the Ayrshire Second Division at the end of the 1982–83 season and won promotion back to the First Division as Second Division Champions in 1986–87 with the club ending as runners up in the Ayrshire Cup, Cunninghame Cup and League Cup in 1987–88 becoming the nearly men.

1990 seen the club appoint Dennis Gray as manager and seven trophy wins were earned during this tenure, back to back Ayrshire Cup wins in 1990–91 and 1991–92. District Cup wins in 1990–91 and 1994–95 alongside League Cup wins in 1991–92 and 1993–94 and the Cunninghame Cup in 1992–93. During this time Dennis Gray was appointed as Scotland Juniors manager and the club also came close to the title finishing runners up in 1994–95. Dennis Gray then left the club to become manager of Auchinleck Talbot where he was the club's record scorer during a highly successful playing career. Dick Brock a former Scotland Juniors manager took over but success did not follow and Frank Lynch was appointed manager for the 1996–97 season. Frank's teams were known for long Scottish Junior Cup runs with the furthest being a Quarter Final replay loss in extra time to eventual winners Arthurlie in 1997–98. The closest to trophy success in this period was a League Cup final loss to Auchinleck Talbot in 1997–98.

The club then appointed former player Neil Muggins as manager and after an unsuccessful season he left and was replaced by Sandy McLean. There was league reconstruction at the end of 2000–01 season in preparation for the merger of the Ayrshire and Central Leagues and Division 1 was reduced to the top 7 teams and Beith did not finish in the required place and started 2001–02 in the Second Division and had to finish in the top 4 to make the playoffs to qualify for the West of Scotland League second tier - the first division below the Premier. Brian Stevenson came in as manager and steered the club to a 3rd-place finish and Beith qualified for the West of Scotland Super League 1st division after beating Dalry Thistle in a two legged play off with the season ending with a North Ayrshire Cup Final loss to Kilbirnie at Largs.

The manager then resigned and Dennis Gray returned to the club as manager with former player Hugh Findlay as his assistant. This second tenure brought another 4 trophies to the club with another back to back success in the Ayrshire Cup in 2002–03 and 2003–04, North Ayrshire Cup in 2003–04 and the League Cup in 2004–05 finishing runners up in North Ayrshire Cup and Evening Times Cup in 2004–05. There were two Scottish Cup quarter finals in this period, losing both times to the eventual runners up in Linlithgow Rose in 2002–03 and Bathgate in 2005–06. Following Dennis retiring/resigning near the end of 2005–06 season, Frank Lynch was then appointed manager with John Millar as his assistant.

In his first season, Frank Lynch got the club promoted to the Premier Division finishing as runners up in the First Division in 2006–07. In March 2008 the following season Frank Lynch resigned as manager and John Millar stepped up to become Manager.

In 2008–09, the club won the West of Scotland Cup, beating Auchinleck Talbot 2–1 in the final at Pollok and after leading the league for a long period fell away and finished 3rd. In 2009–10 the following season they won the West Premier title by a then record number of points only losing one game, meaning they qualified for the senior Scottish Cup.

During the 2010–11 season, Beith entered the Scottish Cup at the first round stage after qualifying as champions of the West of Scotland Super League Premier Division. In the first round they defeated Linlithgow Rose 2–0 and Glasgow University 8–1 in the second round. In the third round they faced Second Division Airdrie United and led 2–0 with ten minutes remaining of the tie at the Excelsior Stadium, before full-back Marc McShane was red carded. Paul Lovering scored from the resulting cross and Jamie Bain equalised in injury time. Beith were then defeated 4–3 in the replay at Bellsdale Park.

The end of the 2010–11 saw numerous key players leave the club through captain Brian McKeown emigrating to Australia, and other players in Martin McGarvey, Martin Stewart and Craig Brittain retiring along with John Millar resigning as manager for personal reasons. Stevie Easton was then appointed as Manager with Harry Erwin assisting. The club finished 5th in season 2011–12 and following a poor start to the 2012–13 saw Stevie Easton being relieved of his duties in November 2012 with Frank Lynch returning to the club to steady the ship but ultimately unable to change the club's fortunes left the club to see if someone else could come in to boost the club and avoid relegation. John Millar then came back re-invigorated and got some good results but with suspensions and injuries taking their toll lost the last game away to Shotts to be relegated.

The club led the West of Scotland Super League first division for most of the 2013–14 season but were over-taken by a strong Troon team but still finished the season promoted as runners up with a record total for being runners up in that division. That season also seen a penalty shoot out loss in the League Cup final at Troon v Cumnock.

Season 2014–15 saw the club back in the Premier League and consolidated their place in the league with a 6th-place finish and the end of that season seen a turnover of 10 players leaving and 10 players coming in to make a strong push.

Following an inconsistent start to the season no doubt due to the large turnover in the playing staff and then the club won the Scottish Junior Cup for the first time in 2015–16, defeating Pollok on penalties after a 1–1 draw.

During the 2016–17 season the club entered the Scottish Cup, progressing through two preliminary rounds to the 3rd round where they were defeated by Greenock Morton, 6–0 at Bellsdale Park.

During the 2017–18 season, the club won the West Region Premiership title, pipping Auchinleck Talbot by one point on the final day of the league season. The club then won the Evening Times Champions Cup on the final night of the season, a Friday at Benburb beating Petershill in the final.

During the 2018–19, Beith Juniors progressed through two preliminary rounds and the 1st and 2nd round proper to play against Championship leaders at the time, Ayr United making this the first all Ayrshire Junior and Senior Scottish Cup tie, Beith holding the Honest Men for 62 minutes before conceding then losing two goals in the last five minutes after trying to chase a result to lose 3–0. The club won the West of Scotland Cup in the final game of the season, beating Kirkintilloch Rob Roy in the final at Meadow Park.

Under the management of Chris Strain, Beith won back–to–back league titles in the 2022–23 and 2023–24 seasons, but on both occasions were ineligible to participate in the Lowland Football League promotion play-offs as the club did not hold the required SFA Licence.

== Current squad ==
As of 7 July 2026 Note: Flags indicate national team as defined under FIFA eligibility rules; some limited exceptions apply. Players may hold more than one non-FIFA nationality.

No.	Pos.	Nation	Player
—	GK	SCO	Derren Fairns
—	GK	SCO	Kyle Baird
—	GK	SCO	Scott McLellan
—	DF	SCO	Blair Richardson
—	DF	SCO	Kieron Feeney
—	DF	SCO	Conner McGlinchey
—	DF	SCO	Scott Rumsby
—	DF	SCO	Steven Noble
—	DF	SCO	Max Brown
—	DF	SCO	Victor Emordi
—	DF	SCO	Martin Findlay
—	DF	SCO	Ricky Little
—	DF	SCO	Richie McKillen

No.	Pos.	Nation	Player
—	DF	SCO	Ross Taylor
—	DF	SCO	Ryan Cherrie
—	MF	SCO	Ciaran McPherson
—	MF	SCO	Conor O'Donnell
—	MF	SCO	Ben Lewis
—	MF	SCO	Lewis Taylor
—	MF	SCO	Jamie McMinigal
—	MF	SCO	Mark Hansen
—	MF	SCO	Ross Alexander
—	FW	SCO	Daniel Finnigan
—	FW	SCO	Evan Galasso
—	FW	SCO	Thomas Collins (Captain)
—	FW	SCO	Tyler Wright

=== Out on loan ===
Note: Flags indicate national team as defined under FIFA eligibility rules; some limited exceptions apply. Players may hold more than one non-FIFA nationality.

No.	Pos.	Nation	Player
—	MF	SCO	Ciaran Bonnar (on loan at Greenock Juniors)

== Coaching staff ==
Position	Name
Manager	John Hughes
Assistant manager	vacant
Goalkeeping coach	vacant

== Managers ==
Pre-1983, the team was selected by match committee.

- John Minford: 1983 – 1989
- Jim Clarke: 1989 – 1990
- Dennis Gray: 1990 – 1995
- Dick Brock: 1995 – 1996
- Frank Lovering: 1996 – 1999
- Neil Muggins: 1999 – 2000
- Sandy MacLean: 2000 – 2001
- Brian Stevenston: 2001 – 2002
- Dennis Gray: July 2002 – April 2006
- Frank Lynch: May 2006 – March 2008
- John Millar: March 2008 – May 2011
- Stevie Easton: June 2011 – November 2012
- Frank Lynch: November 2012 – March 2013
- John Millar: April 2013 – January 2020
- Bryan Young: January 2020 – May 2022
- Chris Strain: May 2022 – March 2024

== Honours ==
- Scottish Junior Cup
  - Winners: 2015–16
- West of Scotland Football League Premier Division
  - Winners: 2022–23, 2023–24
- West of Scotland Super League Premier Division
  - Winners: 2009–10, 2017–18
- West of Scotland Cup
  - Winners: 1965–66, 1966–67, 2008–09, 2018–19
- Evening Times Champions Cup
  - Winners: 2017–18
- West of Scotland Super League First Division
  - Runners-up (promoted): 2006–07, 2013–14
- Ayrshire League
  - Champions: 1964–65, 1968–69
- North Ayrshire League Section
  - Champions: 1962–63, 1963–64, 1964–65, 1966–67, 1968–69
- Ayrshire Second Division
  - Champions: 1986–87
- Ayrshire Cup (inc Ayrshire Weekly Press Cup, Ayrshire Cup, Ayrshire Junior Cup & Ayrshire Junior Challenge Cup)
  - Winners: 1954–55, 1962–63, 1963–64, 1964–65, 1977–78, 1990–91, 1991–92, 2002–03, 2003–04, 2015–16
- West League Cup
  - Winners: 1956–57
- Cunninghame/North Ayrshire Cup
  - Winners: 1993–94, 2003–04
- Ayrshire/Irvine District Cup (Now merged with Ayrshire Cup)
  - Winners: 1960–61, 1964–65, 1967–68, 1990–91, 1994–95
- Ayrshire Region League Cup
  - Winners: 1981–82, 1991–92, 1993–94, 2004–05
