= Kilsyth Rangers F.C. =

Association football club in Scotland

Kilsyth Rangers
- Full name: Kilsyth Rangers Football Club
- Nickname: The Wee Gers
- Founded: 1913
- Ground: Duncansfield Park, Kilsyth
- Capacity: 2,000
- Coordinates: 55°58′35″N 4°3′56″W
- Chairman: William Dunbar
- Manager: Danny Boyle and Gavin Mackie (Co-Managers)
- League: West of Scotland League First Division
- 2025–26: West of Scotland League Second Division, 6th of 16 (promoted)
Home colours	Away colours

Kilsyth Rangers Football Club are a Scottish football club based in the town of Kilsyth, North Lanarkshire. Nicknamed The Wee Gers, they were formed in 1913 and play at Duncansfield Park, which used to be one of the bigger non-league football grounds in Scotland. They currently wear blue tops and white shorts, the away strip being red tops, black shorts and black socks, and currently compete in the West of Scotland League First Division.

== History ==
The club played in its first Junior Cup Final at Hampden Park in 1954–55 against Duntocher Hibs before a crowd of 64,976. The game ended 1–1 and Kilsyth won the replay 4–1 before a crowd of 30,000, all four goals being scored by the club's most prolific ever striker Alex Querrie. This feat is still a record to this day. Kilsyth lost the 1957 final against Banks O'Dee (1–0) after being hot favourites. The last final success was in 1967 when they beat Rutherglen Glencairn 3–1 after a 1–1 draw in the first game at Hampden which was played in front of 22,000 fans.

The 2000s brought the first league and cup trophies for many years with the club winning the Central League Division One title (2002–03), followed by the Superleague First Division title (2004–05) and the Evening Times Cup Winners Cup 2002–03.

Some famous players to have played for the team are Drew Jarvie (Airdrieonians, Aberdeen, St. Mirren), William Wallace (Heart of Midlothian, Celtic), Frank McGarvey (St.Mirren, Liverpool, Celtic), David Stewart (Leeds United), Pat McMahon (Celtic, Aston Villa), George Mulhall (Aberdeen, Sunderland), Jim Storrie (Airdrieonians, Aberdeen, Leeds United), Gary McStay (Falkirk) plus many more.

Six players from Kilsyth Rangers have gone on to represent Scotland at full international level: James Dougall (one cap 1932), George Mulhall (three caps 1960–64), Drew Jarvie (three caps 1971), David Stewart (one cap 1977), Frank McGarvey (seven caps 1979–84), Willie Wallace (seven caps 1965–69).

The club launched a nostalgic DVD "Glory Days" at Garrell Vale on 28 May 2011, which also coincided with the club winning the Central League Division One title for a second time.

From August 2017, team were managed by former Dunfermline Athletic player, Chris McGroarty.

On 1 May 2018, the club appointed former Queen of the South captain Jim Thomson and ex-Stenhousemuir and Junior Scotland coach Kevin McGoldrick to take over as Kilsyth Rangers' new management team. With both Thomson and McGoldrick moving on, Kilsyth appointed former player Gary Kelly as manager on 28 September 2019, assisted by Stuart Livingston, also a former player.

In December 2021 Gary Kelly and Stuart Livingston announced they were standing down from the Club Management. After Christmas the Club announced a new management team of Alan McConville (another former player) and Dylan Daniels.

On 22 October 2022, Carlo Girasoli has been appointed new manager at the club. His assistants will be Peter Keegan and Kevin Walsh.

== Rivalries ==
The club's biggest rivals are Kirkintilloch Rob Roy, who are based in nearby Kirkintilloch. There were two league derbies in season 2014–15 as Rob Roy were relegated into the same league as Kilsyth. However, while Kirkintilloch Rob Roy immediately returned to the Super Premier Division, and finished second in season 2016-17, Kilsyth Rangers still languish in the lower divisions and there have been no league derbies since.

== Stadium ==
The record attendance at Duncansfield Park is 8,740 for a game against Broxburn Athletic in a 1951 Scottish Junior Cup tie.

Currently the capacity is around 2000, capacity of the enclosure which runs the length of the pitch is officially 500.

== Honours ==
Scottish Junior Cup

- Winners: 1954–55, 1966–67
- Runners-up: 1956–57

West Superleague First Division

- Winners: 2004–05

Central League First Division

- Winners: 2002–03, 2010–11

=== Other Honours ===
- West of Scotland Cup winners: 1953–54, 1967–68
- Central League champions: 1947–48, 1953–54, 1956–57
- Central League Division One: 1982–83
- Scottish Junior League: 1926–27
- Glasgow Dryburgh Cup: 1953–54, 1967–68
- Evening Times Cup Winners Cup: 2002–03
- Stirlingshire Junior Cup: 1894–95, 1918–19,1937–38, 1945–46, 1952–53 to 1959–60 (8 times) and 1961–62
- Pompey Cup: 1956–57,1957–58
- Glasgow Junior Cup: 1930–31
- Victory Cup 1923–24
