= Larkhall Thistle F.C. =

Association football club in Scotland

Larkhall Thistle
- Full name: Larkhall Thistle Football Club
- Nicknames: Larky, The Jags
- Founded: 1878
- Ground: Gasworks Park, Larkhall
- Coordinates: 55°44′20″N 3°58′39″W
- President: Chris Lenson
- League: West of Scotland League Second Division
- 2025–26: West of Scotland League Second Division, 12th of 16
Home colours	Away colours	Third colours

Larkhall Thistle Football Club is a football club from Larkhall, in South Lanarkshire, Scotland. Formed in 1878, "the Jags" are Scotland's oldest continuous Junior football club and currently compete in the West of Scotland League Second Division. The team plays in red and white stripes and its home ground since 1881 has been Gasworks Park.

== Staff ==
=== Committee members ===
As of 7 August 2022

Position	Name
President	Chris Lenson
Vice-president	Stephen Johnston
Secretary	Fiona Tierney
Treasurer	Hugh Kerr
Committee member and social media manager	Jason Manson
Committee member	Malcolm McKechnie
Committee member	
Committee member	David Ceretti
Committee member	David Perrie
Committee member	David Brown
Committee member	David McGavin
Honorary president and committee member	Roy Gibson

== Players ==
=== First team squad ===
As of 11 October 2021

Note: Flags indicate national team as defined under FIFA eligibility rules; some limited exceptions apply. Players may hold more than one non-FIFA nationality.

No.	Pos.	Nation	Player
2	DF	SCO	Ben Fraser
4	DF	SCO	Aiden McMurray
6	MF	SCO	Macauley Kennedy (captain)
8	MF	SCO	Ryan Carlin
11	MF	SCO	Connor Phairs

No.	Pos.	Nation	Player
15	GK	SCO	Jonny Duncan
16	DF	SCO	Jonny Lindsay
18	FW	SCO	Aaron Shanley
19	MF	SCO	Josh Lindsay
21	DF	SCO	Gary McMullen

== Management team ==
Position	Name
Manager	Vacant
Assistant manager	(Scotland) Jonny Lindsay
Coach	(Scotland) Steven Gayne
Physiotherapist	(Scotland) Julie Thomson
Goalkeeping Coach	(Scotland) Craig Rowan
Kit Manager	(Scotland) Kevin Brown

== Sponsors ==
Larkhall Thistle's main shirt sponsor for the 2022–23 season is L4 Teamwear.

== Notable players ==
"The Jags" are credited with having the most players to step up be capped by the Scotland senior team, one for the Ireland national football team and one for the United States. Thirteen ex-players have been capped by Scotland and five have gone on to captain their country. Scotland captains in bold.

- Paddy McConnell - Ireland national football team, Bradford City, Doncaster Rovers, Southport, Shelbourne, Boston United, Hibernian
- Gerry Baker - St Mirren, Hibernian, Ipswich Town, United States
- Billy Boyd - Clyde
- Tommy Cairns - Rangers
- **Jimmy Carabine** - Third Lanark
- John Clark - Celtic
- Jock Ewart - Bradford City
- Tommy Ewing - Partick Thistle
- Jimmy Gibson - Partick Thistle, Aston Villa
- Neilly Gibson - Rangers, Partick Thistle
- Jock Govan - Hibernian
- **John Hutton** - Aberdeen, Blackburn Rovers
- **Andy McLaren** - Preston North End
- **Willie McStay** - Celtic
- **Alex Raisbeck** - Liverpool
- Hugh Burns - Rangers, Kilmarnock

== Honours ==
Scottish Junior Cup

- Winners: 1907–08, 1913–14
- Runners-up: 1902–03
- Semi-finalists: 1931–32, 1967–68

West of Scotland Cup

- Runners-up: 1989–90

West Central First Division

- Runners-up: 2001–02, 2016–17 (promoted)

West Central Second Division

- Winners: 1999–2000

Lanarkshire Junior League

- Champions: 1895–96, 1912–13, 1913–14, 1930–31, 1947–48, 1951–52

Lanarkshire Cup

- Winners: 1907–08, 1909–10, 1936–37, 1950–51, 1955–56

Lanarkshire League Cup

- Winners: 1932–33, 1935–36, 1938–39, 1952–53, 1956–57, 1959–60

Lanarkshire Central Cup

- Winners: 1944–45, 1945–46, 1947–48

Evening Times Trophy

- Runners-up: 1974–75, 2002–03

Central League Cup

- Runners-up: 2002–03

West of Scotland Football League Third Division

- Runners-up: 2022-23 (Promoted)
