= Glasgow United F.C. =

Association football club in Scotland

Glasgow United
- Full name: Glasgow United Football Club
- Nickname: The Town
- Founded: 1903 (as Shettleston Juniors)
- Ground: Greenfield Park, Glasgow
- Capacity: 1,800 (10 seated)
- Coordinates: 55°51′12″N 4°10′12″W
- Manager: Kieran Scott, Tam Graham
- League: West of Scotland League Second Division
- 2025–26: West of Scotland League Third Division, 9th of 16 (promoted)
- Website: https://glasgowunitedfootballclub.co.uk/
Home colours	Away colours

Glasgow United Football Club are a Scottish football club based in Shettleston, in the East End of Glasgow. Nicknamed the Town, they were formed in 1903 as Shettleston Juniors Football & Athletic Club and renamed prior to the 2021–22 season. The club continues to play at Greenfield Park and currently competes in the West of Scotland League.

Shettleston reached the final of the 1958–59 Scottish Junior Cup, losing 2–1 to Irvine Meadow in front of a crowd of 65,211 fans at Hampden Park. Their fortunes have been mixed in recent years, flitting between the various divisions of the league they have been based in, although they managed to reach the semi-finals of the Scottish Junior Cup in 2000–01, and the quarter-finals of the same competition in 2001–02 and 2014–15.

The team have been led jointly since January 2017 by club owner Hugh Kelly and Bernard ‘Bernie’ Beacom. Kelly and Beacom replaced the previous management team of Peter Weatherson and Ryan McStay.

The current squad includes rapist David Goodwillie, and the surrounding controversy has led to threats of eviction from their facilities by Glasgow City Council leader Susan Aitken. The club have declared that they 'are supporting David with his mental health and will continue to do so'.

== Ground ==
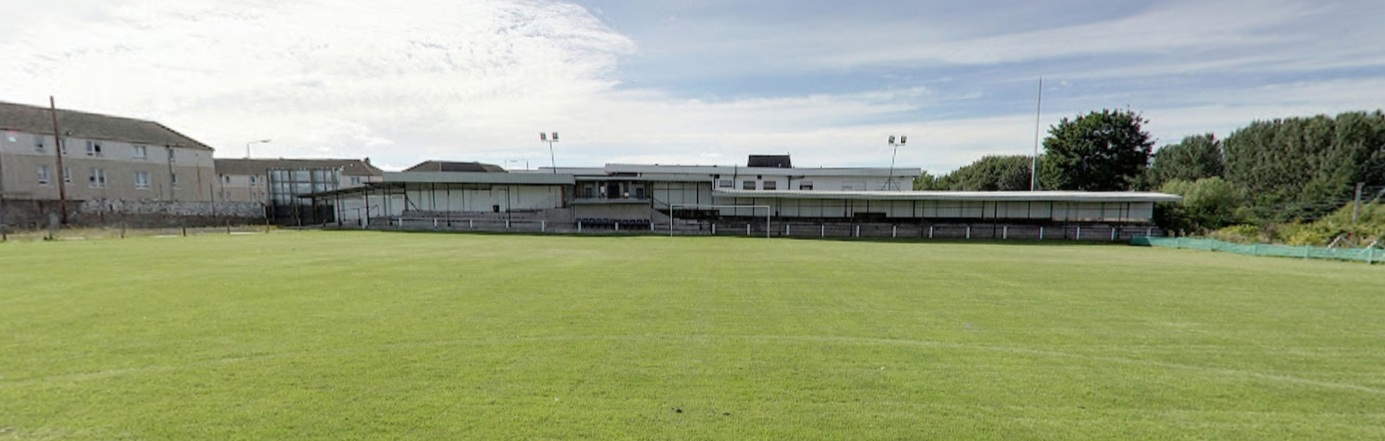
Image of Greenfield Park from the centre spot

Glasgow United play their games in Greenfield Park, situated in Old Shettleston Road, eastern Glasgow. The ground has a capacity of 1,800 and can seat 10 people. The pitch is made of natural grass. The ground's capacity is made up of 2 main stands. The largest being the stand situated on the west of the pitch, which is sheltered and has the few seats available in the ground. The goal opposite is an empty grassed standing area. The second stand, located on the south of the pitch, has limited shelter but larger space for standing. The north of the pitch is empty space which holds no lasting spectating facilities, though this space has the opportunity to be closed off for an expanded capacity. The ground is also connected to a social club on the west of the park.

== Players ==
=== Current squad ===
As of 25 June 2026: Note: Flags indicate national team as defined under FIFA eligibility rules; some limited exceptions apply. Players may hold more than one non-FIFA nationality.

No.	Pos.	Nation	Player
—	GK	SCO	Paul Everett
—	GK	SCO	Ewan Roche
—	DF	SCO	Danny Irvine
—	DF	SCO	Callum McLean
—	DF	SCO	Kyle McMurran
—	DF	SCO	Cody Kerr

No.	Pos.	Nation	Player
—	MF	SCO	Craig Coleman
—	MF	SCO	Shvan Nuri
—	MF	SCO	Lewis Slivinski
—	FW	SCO	David Goodwillie
—	FW	SCO	Steven Lawrie
—	FW	SCO	Richard McIntosh

=== Other squads ===
Glasgow United also have a Under-20s team and a 2004's team.

== Honours ==
(as Shettleston)

Scottish Junior Cup

- Runners-up: 1958–59
- West Region Super First Division: runners-up (promoted): 2014–15
- West Region League One: champions: 2019–20
- West of Scotland Cup winners: 1974–75, 1992–93, 1994–95
- Glasgow Junior League winners: 1923–24, 1926–27
- Central League A Division winners: 1976–77
- Central Division One winners: 1985–86, 1998–99, 2001–02
- Glasgow Junior Cup: 1957–58, 1958–59, 1959–60, 1967–68
- Central League Cup: 1954–55, 1972–73, 2001–02
- Central Sectional League Cup: 1969–70, 1976–77, 1979–80
- Glasgow Junior Consolation Cup: 1925–26, 1937–38
- Glasgow North-Eastern Cup: 1936–37, 1959–60, 1960–61
- Erskine Hospital Charity Cup: 1983–84, 1984–85, 1985–86
- Glasgow Junior Charity Cup: 1929–30, 1937–38, 1956–57
- Glasgow Eastern Charity Cup: 1926–27, 1949–50, 1951–52, 1959–60

== Notable former players ==
- Bob Connelly
- Tommy Docherty
- A. Scott Duncan
- Campbell Forsyth
- Bill Gorman
- Ernie Merrick
- Keigan Parker
- Brian McEwan
- Bobby Russell
- John Wheatley
- David Goodwillie

== Notable assistant coach ==
- Tommy Coyne
