= Carluke Rovers F.C. =

Association football club in Scotland

Carluke Rovers
- Full name: Carluke Rovers Football Club
- Nickname: The Rovers
- Founded: 1887
- Ground: John Cumming Stadium, Carluke
- Coordinates: 55°44′8″N 3°49′19″W
- Chairman: Vacant
- Manager: Thomas Devine
- League: West of Scotland League Third Division
- 2025–26: West of Scotland League Fourth Division, 3rd of 16 (promoted)
Home colours	Away colours

Carluke Rovers Football Club are a Scottish football club based in Carluke, South Lanarkshire. Nicknamed The Rovers, they were formed in 1887, although documented evidence shows a club called Milton Rovers, Carluke's original name, were playing matches during 1886, and are based in the John Cumming Stadium. The club compete in the West of Scotland League Third Division. The team are managed by Thomas Devine along with Mark McRoberts (Coach), Peter Kane (Coach), Tony Boyce (Coach), Scott Mathieson (Coach) & Cieran Henderson (Sports Scientist)

== John Cumming Stadium ==
Rovers moved into the newly built John Cumming Stadium in April 2011, playing their first competitive game against Benburb in a SJFA Central Division Two match. The stadium is named in honour of the famous ex-Rovers player John Cumming. The ground has a synthetic 4G surface and is also a fully equipped athletics venue with an eight lane track and long jump sand pit. The stadium is also used by the Hamilton Academical women's team for their home matches in the Scottish Women's Premier League.

Carluke had previously played at Loch Park Stadium in the town since 1919. The record attendance was set at 10,119 against Cambuslang Rangers in the quarter final of the Scottish Junior Cup in 1971. This ground was demolished in April 2011 to make way for a supermarket development.

== Notable players ==
- John Cumming - Heart of Midlothian and Scotland. Over 500 appearances for Hearts and that club's most decorated player.
- John Prentice - Hearts, Rangers and Falkirk. Later manager of Clyde, Falkirk, Dundee and the Scotland national team.

== Honours ==
The club have reached the semi-final stage of the Scottish Junior Cup five times and lost on each occasion, most recently in 1967.

- West Central Second Division winners: 2011–12
- Lanarkshire League winners: 1922–23, 1956–57, 1958–59
- Central League B Division winners: 1971–72
- Lanarkshire Junior Cup: 1889–90, 1890–91, 1922–23, 1932–33, 1957–58, 1958–59, 1961–62, 1966–67
- Lanarkshire Hozier Cup: 1888–89, 1889–90, 1926–27, 1947–48, 1954–55, 1956–57, 1957–58, 1961–62, 1967–68
- Glasgow Junior Cup: 1928–29
