= Girvan F.C. =

Association football club in Scotland

Girvan
- Nicknames: The Seasiders, the Amateurs (pre-2004)
- Founded: 1947
- Ground: Hamilton Park, Girvan
- Capacity: 5,000 (200 seated)
- Coordinates: 55°14′47″N 4°50′49″W
- Chairman: Danny McCulloch (Scotland)
- Manager: Greg Gallagher (Scotland)
- League: West of Scotland League Third Division
- 2025–26: West of Scotland League Third Division, 11th of 16
Home colours	Away colours

Girvan Football Club is a Scottish football club based in Girvan, South Ayrshire. Nicknamed the Seasiders, they were formed in 1947 and play at Hamilton Park. They currently compete in the West of Scotland League Third Division.

== History ==
Prior to the 2004–05 season, Girvan played in the South of Scotland Football League and as a full member of the Scottish Football Association, entered the Scottish Qualifying Cup each year. When the club joined the Scottish Junior Football Association in 2004, they were allowed to continue this arrangement and since Scottish Cup re-organisation in 2007, now qualify directly for the tournament every season. This situation was unique to Girvan until 2014; when fellow Junior clubs Banks O' Dee and Linlithgow Rose also achieved full SFA member status via club licensing.

On 26 June 2018, Ian Patterson became the manager at Girvan, assisted by former Craigmark assistant and fellow ex-Girvan player Greg Gallagher and John ‘Hoots’ Harvey. On 26 January 2020, Patterson was sacked as manager, with former manager Peter Leonard as caretaker manager until the end of the season.

On 29 April 2021, Girvan FC announced a new management team of Matt Maley, Robert Love, Andy McInnes & Jack Martin taking the reins from caretaker manager Peter Leonard.

== Current squad ==
As of 1 July 2021

Note: Flags indicate national team as defined under FIFA eligibility rules; some limited exceptions apply. Players may hold more than one non-FIFA nationality.

No.	Pos.	Nation	Player
—	GK	SCO	Liam Gray
—	GK	SCO	Ewan Henderson
—	DF	SCO	Calum Thomson (captain)
—	DF	SCO	Adam Stevenson (Vice-Captain)
—	DF	SCO	Dylan Fraser
—	DF	SCO	Reece Mitchell
—	DF	SCO	Sandy Robertson
—	DF	SCO	Craig Peck
—	DF	SCO	Bailey Fairbairn
—	DF	SCO	Aidan Berry
—	MF	SCO	Kieran Balfour
—	MF	SCO	Paul Cameron
—	MF	SCO	Scott Dinwoodie
—	MF	SCO	Jai Ewing
—	MF	SCO	Todd Henderson
—	MF	SCO	Mason McIlwraith
—	MF	SCO	Connor Yair
—	MF	SCO	Calum Thomson
—	FW	SCO	Scott Dempster
—	FW	SCO	Craig Harvey
—	FW	SCO	Euan Smith
—	FW	SCO	Stewart Kean

== Management team and coaching staff ==
Management
Role	Person
Manager	(Scotland) Dean Keenan
Assistant Manager	(Scotland) Andy Rodgers
Coaches	(Scotland) Scott Taylor
First Aid	(Scotland)

== Honours ==
South of Scotland Football League

- Winners: 1989–90

South of Scotland League Cup: 1975–76, 1977–78, 1991–92, 2001–02
