= Yoker Athletic F.C. =

Association football club in West Dunbartonshire, Scotland

Yoker Athletic
- Full name: Yoker Athletic Football Club
- Nickname: Whe Ho
- Founded: 1886
- Ground: Holm Park, Clydebank
- Capacity: 1200
- Coordinates: 55°53′33″N 4°23′31″W
- Manager: vacant
- League: West of Scotland League Second Division
- 2025–26: West of Scotland League Third Division, 5th of 16 (promoted)
- Website: http://www.yokerathletic.com
Home colours	Away colours

Yoker Athletic Football Club are a Scottish football club based in Clydebank near Glasgow. Yoker is an area of Glasgow adjacent to Clydebank, however Yoker's stadium lies just outside the Glasgow boundary. Nicknamed the Whe Ho, the club were formed in 1886 and are based at Holm Park. The club currently operate in the West of Scotland League Second Division and play in royal blue or orange strips.

Local rivals Clydebank entered the Junior grade in 2003–04 and ground shared with Yoker at Holm Park from 2008 until 2018 after leaving their ground in Duntocher. Yoker were promoted to Central Division One on 23 April 2011 after an 8–0 victory over Newmains United.

The team was co-managed since January 2019 by Peter McKenna and Tommy Montgomery, Gordon Robertson took over as manager in 2022 but has since been replaced by Dominic O'Donnell and Paul Brown.

Yoker Athletic can boast of a mention in Scottish literature and film; James Kelman's novel, A Disaffection, has the main character attending a match at Holm Park, while the club is also mentioned briefly in an episode of Scottish cult classic Limmy's Show.

== Ground ==
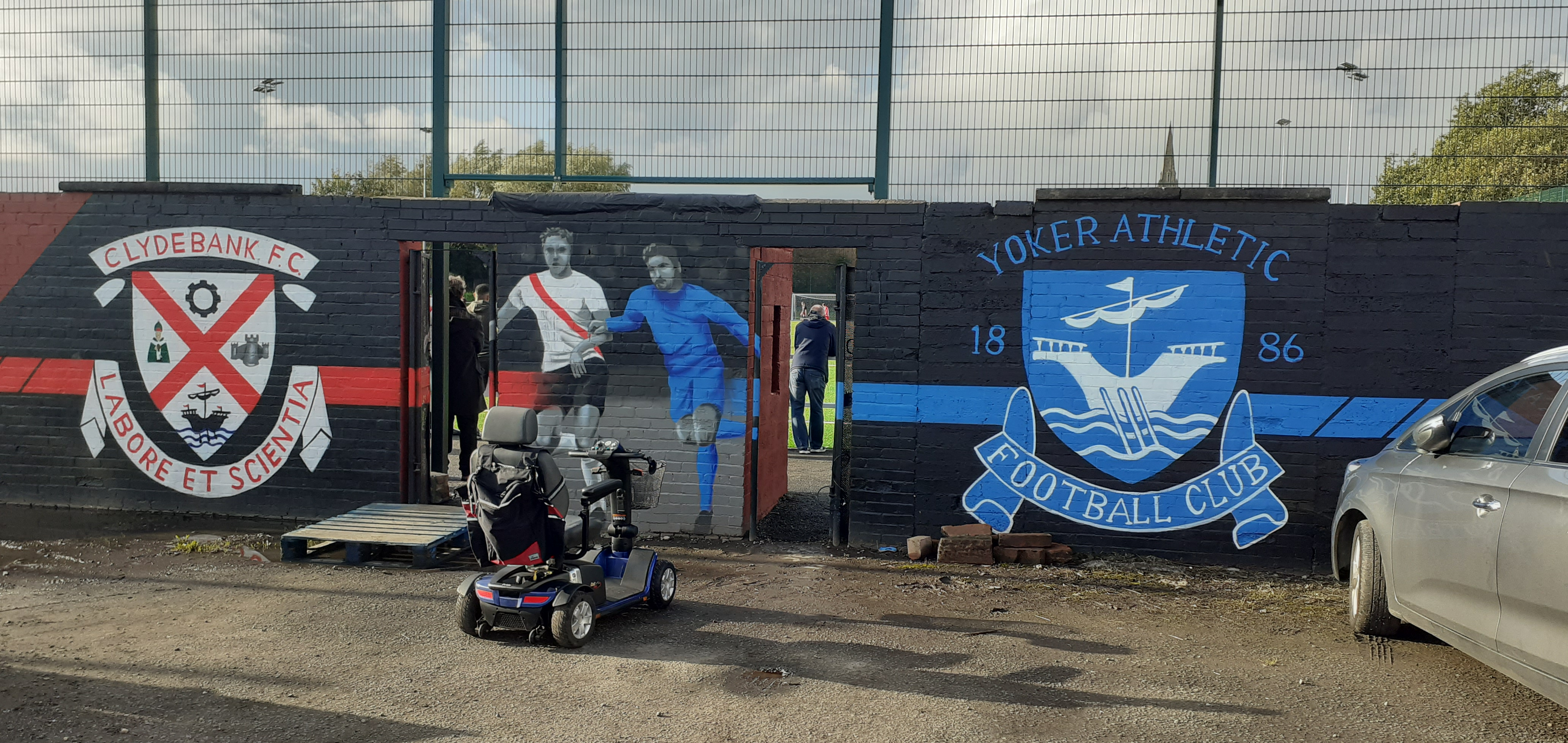
The exterior of Holm Park showing Clydebank and Yoker badges

The club play at Holm Park which they share with Clydebank. It is a council-owned ground with floodlights and a synthetic pitch.

== Honours ==
Scottish Junior Cup

- Winners: 1932–33
- Runners-up: 1935–36, 2021-22

Central League Division 1

- Runners-up (Promoted to Super First): 2011–12

Central League Second Division

- Winners: 2010–11

Central League Division Two

- Winners: 1988–89

=== Other honours ===
- West of Scotland Cup winners: 1930–31
- Glasgow Dryburgh Cup: 1947–48
- Central (Beatons Coaches) Sectional League Cup: 1985–86
- Central League Cup - Runners-up 2016–17
