= 2012–13 West of Scotland Super League Premier Division =

Stagecoach West of Scotland Super League Premier Division
- Season: 2012–13
- Champions: Auchinleck Talbot
- Relegated: Ashfield; Beith Juniors; Shotts Bon Accord
- Matches: 132
- Goals: 443 (3.36 per match)
- Biggest home win: Kirkintilloch Rob Roy 7–3 Glenafton Athletic; 8 September 2012
- Biggest away win: Kirkintilloch Rob Roy 0–6 Irvine Meadow; 27 April 2013
- Highest scoring: Kirkintilloch Rob Roy 7–3 Glenafton Athletic; 8 September 2012
- Longest winning run: (13) Auchinleck Talbot; 29 December 2012 – season end
- Longest unbeaten run: (22) Auchinleck Talbot whole season undefeated
- Longest losing run: (5) Cumnock Juniors; 27 October 2012 – 29 December 2012; Irvine Meadow; 3 November 2012 – 29 December 2012

The 2012–13 West of Scotland Super League Premier Division was the eleventh Super League Premier Division competition since the formation of the Scottish Junior Football Association, West Region in 2002. The season began on 18 August 2012. The winners of this competition gain direct entry to round one of the 2013–14 Scottish Cup. The two last placed sides were relegated to the Super League First Division. The third-bottom placed side entered the West Region league play-off, a two-legged tie against the third placed side in the Super League First Division, to decide the final promotion/relegation spot.

Auchinleck Talbot won the championship on 1 May 2013.

== Member clubs for the 2012–13 season ==
Irvine Meadow were the reigning champions.

Glenafton Athletic and Shotts Bon Accord were promoted from the Super League First Division, replacing Largs Thistle and Kilbirnie Ladeside.

Pollok had retained their place in the league after defeating Renfrew in the West Region League play-off.

Club	Location	Ground	Manager	Finishing position 2011–12
Arthurlie	Barrhead	Dunterlie Park	Mark Cameron	7th
Ashfield	Possilpark, Glasgow	Saracen Park	Stevie Rankin	6th
Auchinleck Talbot	Auchinleck	Beechwood Park	Tommy Sloan	3rd
Beith Juniors	Beith	Bellsdale Park	John Millar	5th
Clydebank	Clydebank	Holm Park	Billy McGhie	4th
Cumnock Juniors	Cumnock	Townhead Park	Brian McLuckie	9th
Glenafton Athletic	New Cumnock	Loch Park	Darren Henderson	Super League First Division, 1st
Irvine Meadow	Irvine	Meadow Park	Mark Campbell (caretaker)	Champions
Kirkintilloch Rob Roy	Kirkintilloch	Adamslie Park	Jimmy Lindsay & Derek Frye	8th
Petershill	Springburn, Glasgow	Petershill Park	Willie Paterson & Scott Smith	2nd
Pollok	Newlands, Glasgow	Newlandsfield Park	John Richardson	10th
Shotts Bon Accord	Shotts	Hannah Park	Tam McDonald	Super League First Division, 2nd

=== Managerial changes ===
Club	Outgoing manager	Manner of departure	Date of vacancy	Position in table	Incoming manager	Date of appointment
Beith Juniors	Stevie Easton	Sacked	12 November 2012	11th	Frank Lynch	14 November 2012
Cumnock Juniors	Stevie Farrell	Appointed asst. manager at Stranraer	15 December 2012	10th	Brian McLuckie	18 December 2012
Beith Juniors	Frank Lynch	Resigned	18 April 2013	11th	John Millar	18 April 2013
Shotts Bon Accord	Tony McInally	Resigned	27 April 2013	12th	Tam McDonald	4 June 2013
Irvine Meadow XI	Chris Strain	Sacked	15 May 2013	6th	Stevie Rankin	15 May 2013
Kirkintilloch Rob Roy	Jimmy Lindsay & Derek Frye	Resigned	End of season	7th	Stewart Maxwell	11 May 2013
Arthurlie	Mark Cameron	Appointed asst. manager at Albion Rovers	End of season	6th	Gavin Duncan	20 May 2013
Ashfield	Stevie Rankin	Appointed manager at Irvine Meadow	End of season	10th	John Conlin	19 May 2013

== League table ==
Pos	Team	Pld	W	D	L	GF	GA	GD	Pts	Qualification or relegation
1	Auchinleck Talbot (C)	22	20	2	0	62	14	+48	62	Qualification for 2013–14 Scottish Cup
2	Petershill	22	11	6	5	41	23	+18	39	
3	Clydebank	22	11	3	8	34	32	+2	36	
4	Glenafton Athletic	22	10	2	10	26	37	−11	32	
5	Irvine Meadow	22	9	3	10	36	37	−1	30	
6	Arthurlie	22	8	5	9	40	40	0	29	
7	Kirkintilloch Rob Roy	22	8	5	9	49	50	−1	29	
8	Pollok	22	7	6	9	25	35	−10	27	
9	Cumnock Juniors	22	7	4	11	36	40	−4	25	
10	Ashfield (R)	22	7	4	11	35	40	−5	25	Qualification for West Region League play-off
11	Beith Juniors (R)	22	7	3	12	36	50	−14	24	Relegation to Super League First Division
12	Shotts Bon Accord (R)	22	2	7	13	23	45	−22	13	Relegation to Super League First Division

Updated to match(es) played on 8 June 2013. Source: SJFA West Region
Rules for classification: 1) points; 2) goal difference; 3) number of goals scored.
(C) Champions; (R) Relegated

== Results ==
Home \ Away	ART	ASHF	AUC	BEI	CLY	CMN	GLE	IVM	KRR	PSH	PLK	SBA
Arthurlie		3–1	2–3	4–1	1–2	1–1	1–4	2–2	3–3	1–1	2–2	3–0
Ashfield	2–1		1–3	1–1	4–2	4–2	2–0	5–2	2–2	1–2	3–2	1–1
Auchinleck Talbot	3–0	4–1		3–3	5–1	2–0	4–0	2–0	3–3	2–1	4–0	2–1
Beith Juniors	0–2	2–1	0–1		1–4	2–3	1–2	3–0	3–2	1–4	2–2	2–1
Clydebank	1–2	1–0	0–3	4–0		2–1	3–0	1–0	0–3	1–1	1–0	0–3
Cumnock Juniors	4–3	2–0	0–2	2–4	1–3		0–1	2–2	1–2	4–0	0–0	3–0
Glenafton Athletic	1–2	3–1	0–1	1–3	3–2	1–0		2–1	0–4	1–0	0–1	2–0
Irvine Meadow	2–1	1–0	0–2	2–3	2–0	2–1	0–1		3–3	1–4	2–1	2–1
Kirkintilloch Rob Roy	0–4	2–1	0–3	4–0	0–3	1–3	7–3	0–6		2–3	1–2	4–2
Petershill	4–0	2–3	0–1	2–1	1–1	4–0	3–0	2–0	1–0		1–1	2–2
Pollok	3–1	1–0	1–4	3–2	0–1	1–3	0–0	0–2	2–2	0–3		2–1
Shotts Bon Accord	0–1	1–1	0–5	2–1	1–1	3–3	1–1	1–4	2–4	0–0	0–1	

Updated to match(es) played on 8 June 2013. Source: SJFA West Region
Legend: Blue = home team win; Yellow = draw; Red = away team win.

=== West Region League play-off ===
Largs Thistle, who finished third in the Super League First Division, defeated Ashfield 4 – 3 on penalty kicks after a 7 – 7 draw on aggregate in the West Region League play-off. Largs will replace Ashfield in the 2013–14 West of Scotland Super League Premier Division.

3 June 2013
19:30

Ashfield	3 – 3	Largs Thistle
Paul Maxwell 20'; Alistair Martin 72'; Mark Thomson 74' (pen.)	Report	32' (o.g.) Lee McShane; 52' Willie McClure; 87' Eddie Walton

Saracen Park, Glasgow
Referee: Steven Reid
5 June 2013
19:30

Largs Thistle	4 – 4	Ashfield
Eddie Walton 21'; Graham Muir 47'; Nicky Little 52'; Barri Stanton 65'		3' Shaun Fraser; 17' Paul Maxwell; 20' Alistair Martin; 90' (pen.) Mark Thomson
Penalties
	4 – 3

Barrfields Stadium, Largs
Referee: Nick Walsh
