= 2021–22 South Challenge Cup =

SFA South Region Challenge Cup

Tournament details
- Country: Scotland; England (2 teams)
- Dates: 11 September 2021 – 22 May 2022
- Teams: 161

Final positions
- Champions: Auchinleck Talbot

Tournament statistics
- Matches played: 141
- Goals scored: 680 (4.82 per match)

The 2021–22 SFA South Region Challenge Cup was the 15th edition of the annual knockout cup competition for senior non-league clubs in the central and southern regions of Scotland. The tournament entry increased from 142 to a record 161 teams thanks to additional clubs joining the East of Scotland Football League and West of Scotland Football League.

The defending champions were Dunipace, who beat Broomhill 3–1 in the delayed final of the 2019–20 edition on 15 August 2021. However they went out of the competition in the second round, losing 2–1 to Sauchie Juniors.

Auchinleck Talbot of the West of Scotland League lifted the trophy in their first season competing in the competition, beating Lowland League champions Bonnyrigg Rose Athletic 3–1 in the final.

== Format ==
The South Challenge Cup featured 161 senior non-league clubs from the Lowland Football League (16), East of Scotland Football League (58), South of Scotland Football League (12), and West of Scotland Football League (75).The reserve teams of Stirling University, Caledonian Braves, and Stranraer, as well as Celtic B and Rangers B, do not take part. Heston Rovers and Westerton United withdrew from the competition and their respective leagues after the initial draw was made.

For the first time since 2015–16, the first and second rounds were regionalised, with north-east, south-east, south-west, and north-west sections each containing 40 or 41 clubs.

The draw was unseeded, with matches proceeding to extra time and penalties if they were tied after 90 minutes.

== Calendar ==
Round	Main date	Fixtures	Clubs
First Round	11 September 2021	33	161 → 128
Second Round	16 October 2021	64	128 → 64
Third Round	20 November 2021	32	64 → 32
Fourth Round	5 February 2022	16	32 → 16
Fifth Round	5 March 2022	8	16 → 8
Quarter-Finals	2 April 2022	4	8 → 4
Semi-Finals	30 April 2022	2	4 → 2
Final	22 May 2022	1	2 → 1

== First round ==
The draw for the regionalised first and second rounds took place on Friday 4 June 2021. Each zone features 8 fixtures in the first round with 24 clubs receiving a bye to the second round (except the South-East zone featuring 9 matches and 23 byes). Preston Athletic, Syngenta, and Tranent Juniors progressed to the second round after their opponents were unable to field a team.

=== North-East zone ===
11 September 2021	Bellshill Athletic	2–5	Dundonald Bluebell	Bellshill
14:00				Stadium: Rockburn Park

11 September 2021	Caledonian Braves	3–1	Shotts Bon Accord	Motherwell
15:00				Stadium: Alliance Park

11 September 2021	Camelon Juniors	2–1	Kirkintilloch Rob Roy	Camelon
14:30				Stadium: Carmuirs Park

11 September 2021	East Stirlingshire	1–2	Linlithgow Rose	Falkirk
15:00				Stadium: Falkirk Stadium

11 September 2021	Hill of Beath Hawthorn	1–2 (a.e.t.)	Sauchie Juniors	Sauchie
14:30				Stadium: Beechwood Park

11 September 2021	Kilsyth Athletic	1–3	Oakley United	Oakley (Note: Played at the away team's ground due to the WOSFL Division Four club not meeting ground criteria.)
14:00				Stadium: Blairwood Park

11 September 2021	Kinnoull	5–2	Lochgelly Albert	Perth
14:30				Stadium: Tulloch Park

11 September 2021	Syngenta	w/o	Newburgh
14:30

=== South-East zone ===
11 September 2021	Craigroyston	2–6	Armadale Thistle	Warriston, Edinburgh
14:30				Stadium: St Mark's Park

11 September 2021	Edinburgh South	2–4	Whitburn	Dalkeith
14:30				Stadium: King's Park

11 September 2021	Edinburgh University	1–1 (a.e.t.) (5–4 p)	Heriot-Watt University	Peffermill, Edinburgh
15:00				Stadium: East Peffermill

11 September 2021	Haddington Athletic	2–1	Dunbar United	Haddington
14:30				Stadium: Millfield Park

11 September 2021	Musselburgh Athletic	0–1	Tynecastle	Musselburgh
14:30				Stadium: Olivebank stadium

11 September 2021	Preston Athletic	w/o	Fauldhouse United
14:30

11 September 2021	Pumpherston	5–1	Vale of Leithen	Pumpherston
14:30				Stadium: Recreation Park

11 September 2021	Tranent Juniors	w/o	Livingston United
14:30

11 September 2021	Whitehill Welfare	2–4	Coldstream	Rosewell
14:30				Stadium: Ferguson Park

=== South-West zone ===
11 September 2021	Carluke Rovers	1–6	Cambuslang Rangers	Carluke
14:00				Stadium: John Cumming Stadium

11 September 2021	Dalbeattie Star	0–1	Whitletts Victoria	Dalbeattie
15:00				Stadium: Islecroft Stadium

11 September 2021	Glenafton Athletic	2–1	Craigmark Burntonians	New Cumnock
14:00				Stadium: Loch Park

11 September 2021	Lugar Boswell Thistle	6–2	Wigtown & Bladnoch	Lugar
14:00				Stadium: Rosebank Park

11 September 2021	Nithsdale Wanderers	2–7	Hurlford United	Sanquhar
15:00				Stadium: Lorimer Park

11 September 2021	Royal Albert	2–3	Wishaw	Stonehouse
14:00				Stadium: Tileworks Park

11 September 2021	Troon	13–0	Mid-Annandale	Troon
14:00				Stadium: Portland Park

11 September 2021	Upper Annandale	0–4	Lesmahagow	Moffat
15:00				Stadium: Moffat Academy

=== North-West zone ===
11 September 2021	Ashfield	4–6	Greenock Juniors	Possilpark, Glasgow
14:00	Ryan McManus; Darren Burns			Stadium: Saracen Park

11 September 2021	Beith Juniors	2–1	Neilston	Beith
14:00				Stadium: Bellsdale Park

11 September 2021	Glasgow United	4–1	Dalry Thistle	Shettleston, Glasgow
14:00				Stadium: Greenfield Park

11 September 2021	Glenvale	0–5	Petershill	Springburn, Glasgow
14:00				Stadium: Petershill Park

11 September 2021	Kilbirnie Ladeside	9–0	Ardeer Thistle	Kilbirnie
14:00				Stadium: Valefield Park

11 September 2021	Kilwinning Rangers	7–0	Ardrossan Winton Rovers	Kilwinning
14:00	Calvin Kemp 3', 57'; Thomas Collins 23'; Ally McColm 30', 34', 39'; David Ramsay 75'			Stadium: Buffs Park

11 September 2021	Maryhill	1–2	Arthurlie	Maryhill, Glasgow
14:00				Stadium: Lochburn Park

11 September 2021	St Roch's	1–2	Largs Thistle	Royston, Glasgow
14:00				Stadium: James McGrory Park

== Second round ==
The second round took place on the weekend of 16 October 2021, with 16 fixtures in each zone. Lugar Boswell Thistle and Renfrew received a bye to the third round after their opponents withdrew from the competition after the draw was made.

=== North-East zone ===
15 October 2021	Bo'ness Athletic	3–1	Gartcairn	Bo'ness
19:30				Stadium: Newtown Park

15 October 2021	Cumbernauld Colts	2–0	Rosyth	Cumbernauld
19:45				Stadium: Broadwood Stadium

16 October 2021	Bo'ness United	w/o	Kirkcaldy & Dysart	Bo'ness
15:00				Stadium: Newtown Park

16 October 2021	Burntisland Shipyard	1–3 (a.e.t.)	University of Stirling	Burntisland
14:30				Stadium: Recreation Park

16 October 2021	Caledonian Braves	4–0	Kennoway Star Hearts	Motherwell
				Stadium: Alliance Park

16 October 2021	Cumbernauld United	1–0	Inverkeithing Hillfield Swifts	Cumbernauld
14:00				Stadium: Guy's Meadow

16 October 2021	Dundonald Bluebell	1–0	Crossgates Primrose	Cardenden
				Stadium: Moorside Park

16 October 2021	Dunipace	1–3	Sauchie Juniors	Denny
14:30				Stadium: Westfield Park

16 October 2021	Glasgow University	0–2	Luncarty	Airdrie
14:00				Stadium: Excelsior Stadium

16 October 2021	Glenrothes	3–1	St Andrews United	Glenrothes
14:30				Stadium: Warout Stadium

16 October 2021	Jeanfield Swifts	2–0	Broomhill	Perth
14:30

16 October 2021	Kilsyth Rangers	2–2 (a.e.t.) (5–6 p)	Thorniewood United	Kilsyth
14:00

16 October 2021	Kinnoull	1–3	Harthill Royal	Perth
14:30

16 October 2021	Linlithgow Rose	2–1	Camelon Juniors	Linlithgow
				Stadium: Prestonfield

16 October 2021	Syngenta	2–0	Oakley United	Stenhousemuir
14:30				Stadium: Ochilview Park

16 October 2021	Thornton Hibs	1–4	Lochore Welfare	Thornton
14:30

=== South-East zone ===
16 October 2021	Berwick Rangers	1–1 (a.e.t.) (3–4 p)	Broxburn Athletic	Berwick-upon-Tweed
15:00				Stadium: Shielfield Park

16 October 2021	Blackburn United	4–3 (a.e.t.)	Stoneyburn
14:30

16 October 2021	Bonnyrigg Rose Athletic	9–1	Arniston Rangers
15:00

16 October 2021	Coldstream	3–0	Tweedmouth Rangers
14:30

16 October 2021	Easthouses Lily Miners Welfare	1–4	The Spartans
14:30

16 October 2021	Edinburgh College	0–7	Penicuik Athletic
14:30

16 October 2021	Edinburgh University	2–0	Dalkeith Thistle
15:00

16 October 2021	Haddington Athletic	4–1	Leith Athletic	Haddington
14:30

16 October 2021	Lothian Thistle Hutchison Vale	1–3	Civil Service Strollers	Pilton, Edinburgh
14:30				Stadium: Ainslie Park

16 October 2021	Newtongrange Star	1–2	Tranent Juniors	Newtongrange
14:30

16 October 2021	Ormiston	2–0	Hawick Royal Albert United	Ormiston
14:30

16 October 2021	Preston Athletic	2–1	Peebles Rovers	Prestonpans
14:30				Stadium: Pennypit Park

16 October 2021	Pumpherston	2–7	Edinburgh United	Pumpherston
14:30

16 October 2021	Tynecastle	1–0	Armadale Thistle
14:30

16 October 2021	West Calder United	2–1	Bathgate Thistle	West Calder
14:30

16 October 2021	Whitburn	1–3	Gala Fairydean Rovers	Whitburn
14:30

=== South-West zone ===
16 October 2021	Abbey Vale	3–4	Newmains United	New Abbey
15:00				Stadium: Maryfield Park

16 October 2021	Auchinleck Talbot	1–0	Forth Wanderers	Auchinleck
14:00				Stadium: Beechwood Park

16 October 2021	Blantyre Victoria	2–0	Cumnock Juniors	Blantyre
14:00				Stadium: Castle Park

16 October 2021	Bonnyton Thistle	1–3	St Cuthbert Wanderers	Kilmarnock
14:00				Stadium: Synergy Arena

16 October 2021	Cambuslang Rangers	7–0	Lochmaben	Cambuslang
14:00				Stadium: Somervell Park

16 October 2021	Darvel	A–A	Gretna 2008	Darvel
14:00				Stadium: Recreation Park

16 October 2021	East Kilbride Thistle	4–2	Newton Stewart	East Kilbride
14:00				Stadium: Showpark

16 October 2021	Girvan	1–2	Maybole Juniors	Girvan
14:00				Stadium: Hamilton Park

16 October 2021	Glenafton Athletic	3–3 (a.e.t.) (4–1 p)	Kello Rovers	New Cumnock
14:00				Stadium: Loch Park

16 October 2021	Hurlford United	4–0	Wishaw	Hurlford
14:00				Stadium: Blair Park

16 October 2021	Larkhall Thistle	0–3	East Kilbride	Larkhall
14:00				Stadium: Gasworks Park

16 October 2021	Lesmahagow	6–3 (a.e.t.)	Creetown	Lesmahagow
14:00				Stadium: Craighead Park

16 October 2021	Lochar Thistle	2–5	Threave Rovers	Dumfries
15:00				Stadium: North West Community Campus

16 October 2021	Lugar Boswell Thistle	w/o	Heston Rovers
14:00

16 October 2021	Muirkirk Juniors	2–4	Whitletts Victoria	Muirkirk
14:00				Stadium: Burnside Park

16 October 2021	Troon	3–1	Lanark United	Troon
14:00				Stadium: Portland Park

==== Replay ====
20 November 2021	Darvel	4–0	Gretna 2008	Darvel
14:00				Stadium: Recreation Park

=== North-West zone ===
16 October 2021	Arthurlie	5–1	Benburb	Barrhead
14:00				Stadium: Dunterlie Park

16 October 2021	Finnart	5–2	BSC Glasgow	Springburn, Glasgow
14:00				Stadium: Springburn Park

16 October 2021	Harmony Row	0–5	Clydebank	Drumoyne, Glasgow
14:00				Stadium: New Tinto Park

16 October 2021	Irvine Meadow XI	5–3	Kilwinning Rangers	Irvine
14:00				Stadium: Meadow Park

16 October 2021	Irvine Victoria	0–1	Vale of Leven	Irvine
14:00				Stadium: Victoria Park

16 October 2021	Johnstone Burgh	1–2	Greenock Juniors	Johnstone
14:00				Stadium: James Y. Keanie Park,

16 October 2021	Kilbirnie Ladeside	4–1	Port Glasgow	Kilbirnie
14:00				Stadium: Valefield Park

16 October 2021	Largs Thistle	5–1	Glasgow Perthshire	Largs
14:00				Stadium: Barrfields Park

16 October 2021	Renfrew	w/o	Westerton United
14:00

16 October 2021	Rossvale	6–0	Campbeltown Pupils	Springburn, Glasgow
14:00				Stadium: Petershill Park

16 October 2021	St Peter's	1–4	Beith Juniors	Renfrew
14:00				Stadium: New Western Park

16 October 2021	Saltcoats Victoria	1–8	Glasgow United	Saltcoats
14:00				Stadium: Campbell Park

16 October 2021	St Anthony's	2–0	Rutherglen Glencairn	Shieldhall, Glasgow
14:00				Stadium: McKenna Park

16 October 2021	Vale of Clyde	0–4	Pollok	Tollcross, Glasgow
14:00				Stadium: Fullarton Park

16 October 2021	Yoker Athletic	0–3	Drumchapel United	Clydebank
14:00				Stadium: Holm Park

17 October 2021	St Cadoc's	3–4	Petershill	Shieldhall, Glasgow
14:00				Stadium: McKenna Park

== Third round ==
The third round took place on the weekend of 20 November 2021, reverting to an open draw with 32 fixtures to be played. The draw took place on 21 October 2021.

19 November 2021	Bo'ness Athletic	2–0	Glenafton Athletic	Bo'ness
20:00				Stadium: Newtown Park

19 November 2021	Cumbernauld Colts	4–3 (a.e.t.)	Tynecastle	Cumbernauld
19:45				Stadium: Broadwood Stadium

20 November 2021	Auchinleck Talbot	7–1	West Calder United	Auchinleck
14:00				Stadium: Beechwood Park

20 November 2021	Beith Juniors	2–1	Rossvale	Beith
13:30				Stadium: Bellsdale Park

20 November 2021	Blantyre Victoria	3–3 (a.e.t.) (4–1 p)	Broxburn Athletic	Blantyre
13:30				Stadium: Castle Park

20 November 2021	Bo'ness United	3–0	East Kilbride Thistle	Bo'ness
15:00				Stadium: Newtown Park

20 November 2021	Bonnyrigg Rose Athletic	4–0	Coldstream	Bonnyrigg
15:00				Stadium: New Dundas Park

20 November 2021	Cumbernauld United	1–0	Glasgow United	Cumbernauld
13:30				Stadium: Guy's Meadow

20 November 2021	Finnart	1–5	Jeanfield Swifts	Perth
14:30				Stadium: Riverside Stadium

20 November 2021	Gala Fairydean Rovers	0–2	University of Stirling	Galashiels
15:00				Stadium: Netherdale

20 November 2021	Glenrothes	1–6	Clydebank	Glenrothes
13:30				Stadium: Warout Stadium

20 November 2021	Haddington Athletic	0–2	The Spartans	Haddington
14:30				Stadium: Millfield Park

20 November 2021	Hurlford United	2–1 (a.e.t.)	Blackburn United	Hurlford
13:30				Stadium: Blair Park

20 November 2021	Irvine Meadow XI	5–2	Penicuik Athletic	Irvine
13:30				Stadium: Meadow Park

20 November 2021	Kilbirnie Ladeside	3–4	Caledonian Braves	Kilbirnie
13:30				Stadium: Valefield Park

20 November 2021	Largs Thistle	1–2	Troon	Largs
13:30				Stadium: Barrfields Park

20 November 2021	Lesmahagow	0–5	Drumchapel United	Lesmahagow
13:30				Stadium: Craighead Park

20 November 2021	Linlithgow Rose	3–2	St Cuthbert Wanderers	Linlithgow
14:30				Stadium: Prestonfield

20 November 2021	Lochore Welfare	0–3	Dundonald Bluebell	Crosshill
13:30				Stadium: Central Park

20 November 2021	Luncarty	2–3 (a.e.t.)	Renfrew	Luncarty
13:30				Stadium: Brownlands Park

20 November 2021	Maybole	3–0	St Anthony's	Maybole
13:30				Stadium: Ladywell Stadium

20 November 2021	Newmains United	0–4	East Kilbride	Newmains
13:30				Stadium: Victoria Park

20 November 2021	Ormiston	1–2	Thorniewood United	Ormiston
13:30				Stadium: Recreation Park

20 November 2021	Petershill	5–0	Greenock Juniors	Springburn, Glasgow
14:00				Stadium: Petershill Park

20 November 2021	Pollok	2–1	Harthill Royal	Newlands, Glasgow
13:30				Stadium: Newlandsfield

20 November 2021	Sauchie Juniors	3–2	Preston Athletic	Sauchie
14:30				Stadium: Becchwood Park

20 November 2021	Syngenta	3–1	Edinburgh United	Stenhousemuir
14:30				Stadium: Ochilview Park

20 November 2021	Threave Rovers	1–3	Civil Service Strollers	Dumfries
14:00				Stadium: Palmerston Park

20 November 2021	Tranent Juniors	3–0	Lugar Boswell Thistle	Tranent
14:30				Stadium: Foresters Park

20 November 2021	Vale of Leven	3–1	Edinburgh University	Alexandria
13:30				Stadium: Millburn Park

20 November 2021	Whitletts Victoria	1–2	Arthurlie	Ayr
13:30				Stadium: Dam Park

15 January 2022	Darvel	5–1	Cambuslang Rangers	Darvel
13:30				Stadium: Recreation Park

== Fourth round ==
The fourth round took place on the weekend of 5 February 2022, however nine of the sixteen matches were postponed until the fifth round date. The draw took place on 20 December 2021 and was broadcast live on the Official Catchup YouTube channel.

=== Draw ===
Lowland League	East of Scotland League	West of Scotland League
Bo'ness United; Bonnyrigg Rose Athletic; Caledonian Braves; Civil Service Strollers; Cumbernauld Colts; East Kilbride; The Spartans; University of Stirling	Premier Division: Dundonald Bluebell; Jeanfield Swifts; Linlithgow Rose; Sauchie Juniors; Tranent Juniors; Conference X: Bo'ness Athletic; Syngenta	Premier Division: Auchinleck Talbot; Beith Juniors; Blantyre Victoria; Clydebank; Cumbernauld United; Darvel; Hurlford United; Irvine Meadow XI; Pollok; Troon; Tier 7 Conferences: Arthurlie; Drumchapel United; Maybole Juniors; Petershill; Renfrew; Thorniewood United; Vale of Leven

=== Matches ===
2 February 2022	University of Stirling	2–1	Hurlford United	Stirling
19:45				Stadium: Forthbank Stadium; Attendance: 63

5 February 2022	Caledonian Braves	2–1	Drumchapel United	Motherwell
15:00				Stadium: Alliance Park

5 February 2022	Clydebank	1–2	Pollok	Clydebank
14:00				Stadium: Holm Park

5 February 2022	Cumbernauld Colts	0–5	East Kilbride	Cumbernauld
15:00				Stadium: Broadwood Stadium

5 February 2022	Linlithgow Rose	2–1	Blantyre Victoria	Linlithgow
14:30				Stadium: Prestonfield

5 February 2022	Renfrew	3–4	Bo'ness Athletic	Renfrew
14:00				Stadium: New Western Park

5 February 2022	The Spartans	4–3 (a.e.t.)	Syngenta	Edinburgh
15:00				Stadium: Ainslie Park

5 March 2022	Arthurlie	0–1	Bonnyrigg Rose Athletic	Barrhead
14:00				Stadium: Dunterlie Park

5 March 2022	Beith Juniors	0–1	Bo'ness United	Beith
14:00				Stadium: Bellsdale Park

5 March 2022	Civil Service Strollers	1–3	Jeanfield Swifts	Edinburgh
15:00				Stadium: Christie Gillies Park

5 March 2022	Cumbernauld United	0–1	Petershill	Cumbernauld
14:00				Stadium: Guy's Meadow

5 March 2022	Irvine Meadow XI	1–3	Auchinleck Talbot	Irvine
14:00				Stadium: Meadow Park

5 March 2022	Maybole Juniors	1–4	Darvel	Maybole
14:00				Stadium: Ladywell Stadium

5 March 2022	Sauchie Juniors	5–1	Troon	Sauchie
14:00				Stadium: Beechwood Park

5 March 2022	Vale of Leven	3–0	Thorniewood United	Alexandria
14:00				Stadium: Millburn Park

8 March 2022	Dundonald Bluebell	2–1	Tranent Juniors	Cardenden
19:30				Stadium: Moorside Park

== Fifth round ==
The fifth round was scheduled to take place on the weekend of 5 March 2022. Due to delays in completing the fourth round, the majority of ties were rescheduled to later dates.

=== Draw ===
Teams in italics were unknown at the time of the draw. Teams in bold advanced to the quarter-finals.

Lowland League	East of Scotland League	West of Scotland League
**Bonnyrigg Rose Athletic**; **Bo'ness United**; Caledonian Braves; **East Kilbride**; **The Spartans**; University of Stirling	Premier Division: Dundonald Bluebell; **Jeanfield Swifts**; Linlithgow Rose; **Sauchie Juniors**; Conference X: Bo'ness Athletic	Premier Division: **Auchinleck Talbot**; Darvel; **Pollok**; Tier 7 Conferences: Petershill; Vale of Leven

=== Matches ===
5 March 2022	Bo'ness Athletic	**1–4**	**East Kilbride**	Bo'ness
14:30				Stadium: Newtown Park

5 March 2022	University of Stirling	**1–3**	**Pollok**	Denny
15:00				Stadium: Westfield Park

9 March 2022	**Auchinleck Talbot**	**3–1**	Caledonian Braves	Auchinleck
19:30				Stadium: Beechwood Park

12 March 2022	Vale of Leven	**1–3**	**The Spartans**	Alexandria
14:00				Stadium: Millburn Park

16 March 2022	**Jeanfield Swifts**	**3–2**	Darvel	Perth
19:30				Stadium: Riverside Stadium

22 March 2022	Dundonald Bluebell	**0–4**	**Bonnyrigg Rose Athletic**	Cardenden
19:30				Stadium: Moorside Park

22 March 2022	Linlithgow Rose	**1–3**	**Sauchie Juniors**	Linlithgow
19:45				Stadium: Prestonfield

23 March 2022	**Bo'ness United**	**4–1**	Petershill	Bo'ness
19:45				Stadium: =Newtown Park

== Quarter-finals ==
The quarter-finals took place on the weekend of 2 April 2022.

=== Draw ===
Lowland League	East of Scotland League	West of Scotland League
Bonnyrigg Rose Athletic; Bo'ness United; East Kilbride; The Spartans	Premier Division: Jeanfield Swifts; Sauchie Juniors	Premier Division: Auchinleck Talbot; Pollok

=== Matches ===
2 April 2022	Auchinleck Talbot	2–1	Pollok	Auchinleck
14:00				Stadium: Beechwood Park

2 April 2022	Bonnyrigg Rose Athletic	3–0	Bo'ness United	Bonnyrigg
15:00				Stadium: New Dundas Park

2 April 2022	East Kilbride	0–2	Sauchie Juniors	East Kilbride
15:00				Stadium: K-Park

2 April 2022	Jeanfield Swifts	3–4 (a.e.t.)	The Spartans	Perth
14:30				Stadium: Riverside Stadium

== Semi-finals ==
The semi-finals were both scheduled to take place on the weekend of 30 April 2022, however the match involving Bonnyrigg Rose was moved to 12 April due to their participation in the Pyramid play-off 2nd leg.

=== Draw ===
Lowland League	East of Scotland League	West of Scotland League
Bonnyrigg Rose Athletic; The Spartans	Sauchie Juniors	Auchinleck Talbot

=== Matches ===
12 April 2022	The Spartans	1–4	Bonnyrigg Rose Athletic	Edinburgh
19:45				Stadium: Ainslie Park

30 April 2022	Auchinleck Talbot	3–1	Sauchie Juniors	Auchinleck
14:00				Stadium: Beechwood Park

== Final ==
The final of the TradeRadiators.com South Challenge Cup was played at the Falkirk Stadium on Sunday 22 May 2022, with a 3pm kick-off.

22 May 2022
15:00

Bonnyrigg Rose Athletic	1–3	Auchinleck Talbot
Currie 7'	Report	Wilson 35' (o.g.); Boylan 52'; Glasgow 88'

Falkirk Stadium, Falkirk
Referee: Ross Hardie
