= 2018–19 West Region Premiership =

West Region Premiership
- Season: 2018–19
- Dates: 4 August 2018 – 14 June 2019
- Champions: Auchinleck Talbot
- Relegated: Renfrew; Petershill; Cambuslang Rangers
- Matches: 240
- Goals: 816 (3.4 per match)
- Biggest home win: Auchinleck Talbot 9–1 Cambuslang Rangers (2 March 2019)
- Biggest away win: Petershill 0–7 Auchinleck Talbot (2 February 2019)
- Highest scoring: Auchinleck Talbot 9–1 Cambuslang Rangers (2 March 2019)
- Longest winning run: 11 matches: Hurlford United
- All statistics correct as of 7 June 2019.

The 2018–19 West Region Premiership was the first season of the West Region Premiership the newly named and expanded top tier of league competition for SJFA West Region member clubs, and the 17th season since the West Region began in 2002. It was the first season after the reconstruction of the West Region into four regionwide divisions.

The league consisted of 16 clubs, 10 from the 2017–18 West of Scotland Super League Premier Division, four from the 2017–18 West of Scotland Super League First Division and the two play-off winners.

Auchinleck Talbot won the title on 15 May 2019 after a 5–0 win over Troon. As champions they entered the preliminary round of the 2019–20 Scottish Cup.

== Teams ==
=== Member clubs for the 2018–19 season ===
Beith were the defending champions.

Petershill, Cambuslang Rangers, Largs Thistle and Renfrew were promoted from the old West of Scotland Super League First Division to allow the new division to expand from 12 to 16 teams.

Irvine Meadow and Troon claimed the final spots after beating Arthurlie and Girvan respectively in the West Region League play-offs.

Club	Location	Ground	Capacity	Seats	Floodlit	Manager	Finishing position 2017–18
Auchinleck Talbot	Auchinleck	Beechwood Park	2,600	500	No	Tommy Sloan	2nd
Beith	Beith	Bellsdale Park	1,500	0	No	John Millar	1st
Cambuslang Rangers	Cambuslang	Somervell Park	3,000	0	No	Alan Paterson	2nd in First Division
Clydebank	Clydebank	Lochburn Park^{1}	1800	205	Yes	Kieran McAnespie	10th
Cumnock	Cumnock	Townhead Park	3,000	0	Yes	Paul Burns	9th
Glenafton Athletic	New Cumnock	Loch Park	3,400	250	No	Craig McEwan	7th
Hurlford United	Hurlford	Blair Park	1,500	0	No	Darren Henderson	8th
Irvine Meadow	Irvine	Meadow Park	5,200	700	No	Brian McGinty	5th in First Division
Kilbirnie Ladeside	Kilbirnie	Valefield Park	3,000	0	No	Liam McGuinness	5th
Kilwinning Rangers	Kilwinning	Abbey Park	2,500	0	No	Chris Strain	4th
Kirkintilloch Rob Roy	Cumbernauld	Guy's Meadow^{2}	2,500	0	No	Stuart Maxwell	6th
Largs Thistle	Largs	Barrfields Stadium	4,500	800	No	Stuart Davidson	3rd in First Division
Petershill	Springburn, Glasgow	Petershill Park	1,500	500	Yes	Willie Paterson	1st in First Division
Pollok	Newlands, Glasgow	Newlandsfield Park	4,000	0	No	Murdo Mackinnon	3rd
Renfrew	Renfrew	New Western Park	1,500	500	Yes	Colin Clark and Martin Ferry	4th in First Division
Troon	Troon	Portland Park	2,600	0	No	Jim Kirkwood	6th in First Division

^{1} Groundsharing with Maryhill.
^{2} Groundsharing with Cumbernauld United.

=== Managerial changes ===
Club	Outgoing manager	Manner of departure	Date of vacancy	Position in table	Incoming manager	Date of appointment
Pollok	Tony McInally	Not given	18 October 2018	4th	Murdo Mackinnon	19 October 2018
Kilbirnie Ladeside	Billy McGhie	Resigned	20 October 2018	13th	Liam McGuinness	6 November 2018
Cumnock Juniors	Peter Leonard	Mutual consent	9 December 2018	6th	Paul Burns	9 December 2018
Cambuslang Rangers	Paul McColl	Suspended	24 December 2018	13th	Billy Campbell	24 December 2018
Cambuslang Rangers	Billy Campbell	Resigned	7 February 2019	16th	Alan Paterson	18 February 2019

== League table ==
Pos	Team	Pld	W	D	L	GF	GA	GD	Pts	Qualification or relegation
1	Auchinleck Talbot (C, Q)	30	27	2	1	82	15	+67	83	Qualification to 2019–20 Scottish Cup
2	Hurlford United	30	22	3	5	79	37	+42	69	
3	Pollok	30	16	8	6	57	32	+25	56	
4	Beith	30	14	10	6	63	41	+22	52	
5	Glenafton Athletic (Note: Glenafton Athletic were awarded a technical victory against Cambuslang Rangers after their match on 22 December 2018 was abandoned.)	30	14	7	9	54	43	+11	49	
6	Irvine Meadow	30	14	5	11	47	48	−1	47	
7	Largs Thistle	30	12	10	8	69	41	+28	46	
8	Clydebank	30	13	4	13	59	47	+12	43	
9	Kilwinning Rangers	30	12	3	15	41	46	−5	39	
10	Cumnock	30	10	4	16	46	63	−17	34	
11	Kirkintilloch Rob Roy	30	8	8	14	41	54	−13	32	
12	Troon	30	9	5	16	39	53	−14	32	
13	Kilbirnie Ladeside	30	10	2	18	38	58	−20	32	
14	Renfrew (R)	30	8	6	16	42	66	−24	30	Relegation to West Region Championship
15	Petershill (Note: Petershill were deducted three points for non-fulfilment of a fixture against Largs Thistle on 29 December 2018.) (R)	30	5	3	22	24	80	−56	15	Relegation to West Region Championship
16	Cambuslang Rangers (Note: Cambuslang Rangers were deducted three points for non-fulfilment of a fixture against Auchinleck Talbot on 29 December 2018.) (R)	30	5	2	23	35	92	−57	14	Relegation to West Region Championship

Source: West Region SJFA
Rules for classification: 1) Points; 2) Goal difference; 3) Goals scored
(C) Champions; (Q) Qualified for the phase indicated; (R) Relegated

== Results ==
Home \ Away	AUC	BEI	CAM	CLY	CMN	GLE	HUR	IVM	KLB	KWN	KRR	LRG	PSH	PLK	REN	TRO
Auchinleck Talbot		1–0	9–1	4–0	4–3	0–1	2–0	1–1	1–0	3–1	3–0	1–0	1–0	2–0	3–0	1–1
Beith	0–5		2–1	3–1	1–2	1–1	3–4	1–1	3–2	0–3	7–2	3–0	6–0	1–3	2–0	1–0
Cambuslang Rangers	0–3	0–3		1–2	1–0	3–2	2–7	0–2	0–5	2–3	4–0	0–6	2–1	1–2	2–2	2–4
Clydebank	2–3	1–2	3–3		2–2	1–2	0–1	0–2	2–0	5–0	2–0	3–0	6–1	1–2	3–1	2–2
Cumnock	0–1	2–2	1–0	3–2		0–3	2–6	4–0	2–1	0–2	2–3	1–7	5–1	1–4	3–1	1–0
Glenafton Athletic	1–5	3–3	3–0 (Note: Glenafton Athletic were awarded a technical victory after their match with Cambuslang Rangers was abandoned on 22 December 2018.)	0–2	4–2		2–2	3–2	3–2	1–0	1–0	1–1	1–1	2–1	6–2	1–2
Hurlford United	0–5	0–0	4–0	5–2	2–0	3–2		4–3	3–1	0–2	1–0	2–1	5–1	3–0	1–0	5–1
Irvine Meadow	1–2	2–2	6–0	0–3	1–0	0–1	2–1		2–0	1–0	2–2	1–1	3–0	1–3	3–0	2–1
Kilbirnie Ladeside	0–1	1–4	1–2	1–1	4–0	0–3	1–6	4–1		1–1	1–0	0–2	1–0	0–4	0–3	3–0
Kilwinning Rangers	0–1	2–2	3–1	0–2	0–2	4–3	1–2	1–2	0–1		2–0	3–1	2–1	0–2	2–1	3–0
Kirkintilloch Rob Roy	1–2	1–1	3–1	1–2	4–3	1–1	2–0	1–2	4–0	3–2		2–2	2–1	0–1	0–0	1–1
Largs Thistle	0–1	0–0	3–0	2–1	3–3	2–1	1–1	7–0	6–0	1–1	1–1		2–1	3–3	5–0	4–2
Petershill	0–7	0–3	2–1	0–3	1–0	0–4	0–4	0–1	1–2	0–1	3–3	1–4		0–4	2–0	0–3
Pollok	1–2	2–2	3–2	4–0	2–0	1–0	0–1	2–0	2–1	3–0	2–3	2–2	0–0		2–2	0–0
Renfrew	1–3	2–4	3–2	1–0	1–1	1–0	0–4	5–1	0–4	3–1	1–0	5–2	3–4	1–1		0–3
Troon	0–5	0–2	7–1	1–5	0–1	1–0	1–2	0–2	0–1	2–1	3–2	1–0	1–2	1–1	1–2	

Source: West Region SJFA
Legend: Blue = home team win; Yellow = draw; Red = away team win.
