= David Gormley =

Scottish footballer and manager

Personal information
- Date of birth: 10 May 1988 (age 38)
- Place of birth: Glasgow, Scotland
- Height: 5 ft 10 in (1.78 m)
- Position: Striker

Youth career
- -2007: Motherwell

Senior career*
| Years | Team | Apps | (Gls) |
| 2007–2008 | Glenafton Athletic | ? | (?) |
| 2008–2010 | Ayr United | 44 | (7) |
| 2009 | → Albion Rovers (loan) | 4 | (0) |
| 2010–2011 | Alloa Athletic | 32 | (4) |
| 2011 | → Elgin City (loan) | 16 | (6) |
| 2011–2012 | Kirkintilloch Rob Roy | ? | (?) |
| 2012–2015 | Auchinleck Talbot | ? | (?) |
| 2015–2017 | Clyde | 69 | (16) |
| 2018–2019 | Pollok | ? | (?) |

Managerial career
- 2019–2021: Rossvale
- 2021-2022: Broomhill
- 2022-2023: Kilwinning Rangers
- 2023-2024: Thorniewood United
- * Club domestic league appearances and goals as of 14:00. 14 January 2019

David Gormley (born 10 May 1988) is a Scottish footballer and former manager of West of Scotland Football League side Thorniewood United, having previously managed Kilwinning Rangers.
He has played senior football for Ayr United, Alloa Athletic, Clyde and also played on loan at both Albion Rovers and Elgin City.

== Career ==
=== Motherwell ===
Gormley began his career with Motherwell at under-14 level and progressed through the ranks until his departure in 2007, aged 19.

=== Glenafton Athletic ===
After his release from Motherwell in the summer of 2007 without making a first team appearance, he was signed by Junior side Glenafton Athletic by then manager Gordon Dalziel.

=== Ayr United ===
Gormley stepped up to the Scottish Football League in the summer of 2008 with Ayr United, for a £1750 transfer fee. Gormley became a real fans' favourite at Somerset Park, and he scored the winning goal as a substitute for Ayr against Raith Rovers at Stark's Park in March 2009, in a match that gave Ayr an advantage in the Second Division title race, which Raith eventually won.

After a spell on the sidelines, Gormley was loaned out to Albion Rovers on a short-term deal in November 2009 and was then released by Ayr after this period expired.

=== Alloa Athletic ===
He signed for Alloa Athletic in January 2010. In January 2011, Gormley came on as a substitute goalkeeper and saved a penalty in a cup-tie against Hamilton Academical. He spent the second half the 2010–11 season with Elgin City on a temporary transfer before being released by Alloa in May 2011.

=== Kirkintilloch Rob Roy ===
After a spell in which he contemplated retiring from football, Gormley joined junior club Kirkintilloch Rob Roy in the summer of 2011.

=== Auchinleck Talbot ===
In 2012, Gormley moved on to another Super League Premier Division team, Auchinleck Talbot.

=== Clyde ===
In June 2015, after three seasons of success at Beechwood Park, Gormley signed for Scottish League Two side Clyde after expressing a desire to play under new Manager & his boyhood hero Barry Ferguson. On 21 November 2015, Gormley scored four goals against Berwick Rangers in a 5–0 win for Clyde at Shielfield Park. He was the first player to hit a quadruple in one match in 33 years.

Gormley was joint-top goal scorer in the Scottish Cup with eight goals in the 2016–17 tournament, he also equaled a club post-war record for most Scottish Cup goals in a single season. He scored once against Brora Rangers in the second round; twice in a 5–0 win against Arbroath in the third round; a hat-trick in a fourth round replay against Stirling Albion; and once each in both Ayr United ties in the fifth round.

=== Pollok ===
In January 2018, Gormley joined West Region Junior side Pollok for an undisclosed fee.

== Managerial career ==
In September 2019, Gormley was handed his first managerial role at Rossvale who competed in the SJFA West Region Premiership. The position at Rossvale became available after the resignation of Gordon Moffat who left to join fellow Premiership team Clydebank. Gormley led Rossvale to 10th place in the last ever Premiership which ended prematurely due to COVID-19.

On 12 July 2021, Gormley was announced as manager of Lowland League side Broomhill who formerly played as BSC Glasgow FC.

After Chris Strain was sacked, Gormley became manager of West of Scotland Football League side Kilwinning Rangers in April 2022 and David lasted at the Buffs until 27 January 2023.

He then moved on to Thorniewood United until he left the following year.

== International recognition ==
Gormley was called up to the Scotland Junior international squad in October 2012 for their fixture against the Republic of Ireland.
