= Mark Campbell (footballer) =

Scottish footballer (born 1978)

Personal information
- Full name: Mark Thomas Campbell
- Date of birth: 4 February 1978 (age 48)
- Place of birth: Irvine, Scotland
- Position: Defender

Youth career
- 1989–1994: Valspar Boys Club
- 1994–1996: Greenock Morton

Senior career*
Years	Team	Apps	(Gls)
1996–1999	Stranraer	63	(11)
1997	→ Maybole (loan)		
1999–2004	Ayr United	98	(7)
2004–2005	Falkirk	26	(1)
2005–2006	St Johnstone	3	(1)
2006–2011	Raith Rovers	138	(18)
2011–2012	Queen of the South	15	(1)
2012–2014	Irvine Meadow		
2014–2016	Auchinleck Talbot		
2016–2017	Troon		
2017–2018	Kilwinning Rangers		
- * Club domestic league appearances and goals

Mark Campbell (born 4 February 1978) is a Scottish former footballer who last played with Kilwinning Rangers.

== Playing career ==
Mark grew up in Auchinleck with younger brother Martyn and they both played for Valspar Boys Club before Mark signed for Greenock Morton as a schoolboy.

=== Stranraer ===
He began his professional career with Stranraer when he was signed by manager Sanny McAnespie in 1996. When Sanny was replaced not long after as manager by Campbell Money, Mark made a loan move to Junior side Maybole. After returning to Stair Park, Mark played in Stranraer's run to the 1997-98 Second Division Championship title. The next season the Stranraer board accepted a £90,000 bid from Ayr United.

=== Ayr United ===
Campbell was signed by manager Gordon Dalziel for Ayr United from Stranraer on 24 February 1999 for a fee of £90,000. Campbell suffered a cruciate ligament injury in his right knee. The injury meant he missed a large number of league games, as well as the 2002 Scottish League Cup Final against Rangers and the 2002 Scottish Cup Semi-Final against Celtic a week later, both at Hampden Park.

In his five years at Ayr, he made over 100 first team appearances in all competitions. He left in the summer of 2004 when his contract expired.

=== Falkirk ===
One of Campbell's former defensive partners at Ayr, John Hughes, signed him for Falkirk in the summer of 2004. After missing out on the cup runs at Ayr, Campbell lifted the Scottish Challenge Cup in November 2004, defeating Ross County at St.Johnstone's McDiarmid Park. That same Falkirk team concluded their season as winners of the Scottish First Division with a 15-point margin over St.Mirren.

=== St. Johnstone ===
Due to his career as a P.E. Instructor at Kilmarnock prison, Campbell rejected the opportunity to turn full-time and remain with Falkirk in the SPL, instead choosing to sign for St.Johnstone under his former Falkirk team-mate Owen Coyle.

Campbell injured his Achilles tendon and moved to Raith Rovers in January 2006.

=== Raith Rovers ===
Manager Gordon Dalziel signed Campbell for a second time in his career when he brought him to a Raith Rovers side who were in the Scottish Second Division. Campbell (as Club Captain) led the team to the Scottish Second Division Championship title in April 2009. Campbell was involved in a serious car crash in February 2010 which ruled him out for nearly a year and threatened to cost him his career. He made his return on Boxing Day 2010 eventually winning the Scottish First Division Player of the Month. Raith finished second in the league. Cuts were made to Raith's playing budget, and Campbell was one of 15 players not offered a new deal at the end of the season.

=== Queen of the South ===
It was announced on 25 June 2011 that Campbell, alongside his ex-Raith colleague Kevin Smith, had agreed terms with Dumfries club, Queen of the South. He made his Queens debut under manager Gus MacPherson on 23 July 2011 in the 2-0 extra-time defeat away to his former club Ayr United in the 2011–12 Scottish Challenge Cup, just one of a number of times where he faced up to his brother Martyn in an opposing team. Campbell went on to make 19 first team appearances for the Palmerston Park club, before the club website announced that he had moved to Scottish Junior side Irvine Meadow.

=== Irvine Meadow ===
Campbell took his first step out of senior football in 14 years when he signed for reigning West of Scotland Super League Premier Division champions Irvine Meadow on 11 February 2012. Campbell was a regular fixture in the back-line as Chris Strain's side made it back-to-back titles, finishing 5 points ahead of Petershill.

When Strain was sacked as manager at the end of the following season, with the club finishing in a mid-table position, Campbell was appointed caretaker manager until the appointment of Stevie Rankin in the close season. Meadow finished runners-up to eventual champions Auchinleck Talbot in the 2013–14 West of Scotland Super League Premier Division.

=== Auchinleck Talbot ===
After his contract at Meadow Park expired, Tommy Sloan signed Campbell for West of Scotland Super League Premier Division Champions Auchinleck Talbot in June 2014. where he won his second championship medal as Talbot won the 2014–15 West of Scotland Super League Premier Division title as well as the 2014–15 Scottish Junior Cup when Talbot defeated Musselburgh Athletic 2–1 at Kilmarnock's Rugby Park.

He suffered the second cruciate ligament injury of his career in November 2015 during a league match against Hurlford United which threatened to bring his career to an end for a second time. Still going through rehabilitation for his knee injury, Campbell left the club in the summer of 2016 upon expiry of his contract.

=== Kilwinning Rangers ===
He signed for Kilwinning Rangers in 2017.

== Coaching career ==
Mark embarked upon a coaching career when he joined Scottish Junior Football Association, West Region side Troon in October 2016.

== Personal life ==
Campbell's brother Martyn Campbell is also a footballer and also played for Kilwinning Rangers.

The two brothers played on the same side for the first time in their professional careers in Martyn's testimonial match at Ayr United's Somerset Park in July 2015.

== Honours ==
Falkirk

- Scottish First Division: 2004–05
- Scottish Challenge Cup: 2004–05

Raith Rovers

- Scottish Second Division: 2008–09

Irvine Meadow

- West of Scotland Super League Premier Division: 2012–13

Auchinleck Talbot

- West of Scotland Super League Premier Division: 2014–15
- Scottish Junior Cup: 2014–15
