= 2019–20 West Region Premiership =

West Region Premiership 2019-2020

West Region Premiership
- Season: 2019–20
- Dates: 3 August 2019 – 11 March 2020 (abandoned)
- Champions: Auchinleck Talbot
- Relegated: None
- Matches: 175
- Goals: 585 (3.34 per match)
- Biggest home win: Auchinleck Talbot 8–1 Troon; (21 August 2019)
- Biggest away win: Cumnock 0–7 Kilbirnie Ladeside; (10 August 2019)
- Highest scoring: Auchinleck Talbot 8–1 Troon; (21 August 2019); Rutherglen Glencairn 4–5 Kilwinning Rangers; (21 August 2019)
- Longest winning run: 8 games: Auchinleck Talbot
- Longest unbeaten run: 8 games: Auchinleck Talbot & Kilwinning Rangers
- Longest winless run: 12 games: Rutherglen Glencairn
- Longest losing run: 8 games: Kirkintilloch Rob Roy

The 2019–20 West Region Premiership was the second and final season of the West Region Premiership the top tier of league competition for SJFA West Region member clubs, and the 18th season since the West Region began in 2002. It was the second season after the reconstruction of the West Region into four regionwide divisions.

As a result of the COVID-19 pandemic, the league was indefinitely suspended on 13 March 2020. The season was officially cancelled on 10 April 2020 following a decision made by the West Region Management Committee, due to the uncertainty surrounding the pandemic and the Scottish Football Association's decision to extend the football shutdown until at least 10 June 2020. Defending champions Auchinleck Talbot were controversially awarded the title on 22 April 2020 on a 'points per game' metric despite sitting third in the table when the season was abandoned.

In April 2020, after prolonged negotiations, all clubs in membership of the West Region applied to join the newly formed West of Scotland Football League.

== Teams ==
Location of teams in 2019–20 West Region Premiership

Auchinleck Talbot were the defending champions.

Cambuslang Rangers, Petershill and Renfrew were relegated from the 2018–19 Premiership. They were replaced by Benburb, Rossvale and Rutherglen Glencairn who were promoted from the 2018–19 SJFA West Region Championship.

=== Stadia and locations ===
| Club | Location | Ground | Capacity | Seats | Floodlit | Manager | Finishing position 2018–19 |
|---|---|---|---|---|---|---|---|
| Auchinleck Talbot | Auchinleck | Beechwood Park | 4,000 | 500 | No | Tommy Sloan | 1st |
| Beith | Beith | Bellsdale Park | 1,500 | 0 | No | John Millar | 4th |
| Benburb | Glasgow | New Tinto Park | 1,000 | 500 | Yes | Paul Lovering | 2nd in Championship |
| Clydebank | Clydebank | Holm Park | 3500 | 0 | Yes | Kieran McAnespie | 8th |
| Cumnock | Cumnock | Townhead Park | 3,000 | 0 | Yes | Paul Burns | 10th |
| Glenafton Athletic | New Cumnock | Loch Park | 3,400 | 250 | No | Craig McEwan | 5th |
| Hurlford United | Hurlford | Blair Park | 1,500 | 0 | No | Darren Henderson | 2nd |
| Irvine Meadow | Irvine | Meadow Park | 5,200 | 700 | No | Brian McGinty | 6th |
| Kilbirnie Ladeside | Kilbirnie | Valefield Park | 3,000 | 0 | No | Liam McGuiness | 13th |
| Kilwinning Rangers | Kilwinning | Kilwinning Sports Club | TBC | 0 | No | Chris Strain | 9th |
| Kirkintilloch Rob Roy | Cumbernauld | Guy's Meadow | 2,500 | 0 | No | Stuart Maxwell | 11th |
| Largs Thistle | Largs | Barrfields Stadium | 4,500 | 800 | No | Stuart Davidson | 7th |
| Pollok | Newlands, Glasgow | Newlandsfield Park | 4,000 | 0 | No | Murdo Mackinnon | 3rd |
| Rossvale | Glasgow | New Tinto Park | 1,000 | 500 | Yes | Gordon Moffat | 3rd in Championship |
| Rutherglen Glencairn | Rutherglen | New Southcroft Park | 1,500 | 0 | Yes | Willie Harvey | 1st in Championship |
| Troon | Troon | Portland Park | 2,600 | 0 | No | Jim Kirkwood | 12th |

Notes

1. Kirkintilloch Rob Roy are ground-sharing with Cumbernauld United at Guy's Meadow.
2. Rossvale are ground-sharing with Benburb at New Tinto Park.

== League table ==
| Pos | Team | Pld | W | D | L | GF | GA | GD | Pts | PPG | Qualification or relegation |
|---|---|---|---|---|---|---|---|---|---|---|---|
| 1 | Auchinleck Talbot (C) | 16 | 13 | 2 | 1 | 51 | 15 | +36 | 41 | 2.56 | All clubs joined the West of Scotland League |
| 2 | Kilwinning Rangers | 25 | 16 | 5 | 4 | 51 | 38 | +13 | 53 | 2.12 | All clubs joined the West of Scotland League |
| 3 | Pollok | 22 | 13 | 3 | 6 | 48 | 22 | +26 | 42 | 1.91 | All clubs joined the West of Scotland League |
| 4 | Glenafton Athletic | 20 | 11 | 3 | 6 | 39 | 30 | +9 | 36 | 1.80 | All clubs joined the West of Scotland League |
| 5 | Irvine Meadow | 22 | 12 | 2 | 8 | 36 | 35 | +1 | 38 | 1.73 | All clubs joined the West of Scotland League |
| 6 | Beith | 21 | 9 | 7 | 5 | 40 | 35 | +5 | 34 | 1.62 | All clubs joined the West of Scotland League |
| 7 | Hurlford United | 19 | 8 | 5 | 6 | 29 | 26 | +3 | 29 | 1.53 | All clubs joined the West of Scotland League |
| 8 | Kilbirnie Ladeside | 24 | 10 | 3 | 11 | 44 | 44 | 0 | 33 | 1.38 | All clubs joined the West of Scotland League |
| 9 | Clydebank | 28 | 11 | 4 | 13 | 42 | 45 | −3 | 37 | 1.32 | All clubs joined the West of Scotland League |
| 10 | Cumnock | 25 | 9 | 5 | 11 | 39 | 45 | −6 | 32 | 1.28 | All clubs joined the West of Scotland League |
| 11 | Rossvale | 25 | 10 | 2 | 13 | 33 | 39 | −6 | 32 | 1.28 | All clubs joined the West of Scotland League |
| 12 | Largs Thistle | 25 | 9 | 4 | 12 | 41 | 44 | −3 | 31 | 1.24 | All clubs joined the West of Scotland League |
| 13 | Benburb | 20 | 5 | 4 | 11 | 27 | 39 | −12 | 19 | 0.95 | All clubs joined the West of Scotland League |
| 14 | Troon | 24 | 6 | 4 | 14 | 31 | 51 | −20 | 22 | 0.92 | All clubs joined the West of Scotland League |
| 15 | Rutherglen Glencairn | 17 | 3 | 3 | 11 | 26 | 42 | −16 | 12 | 0.71 | All clubs joined the West of Scotland League |
| 16 | Kirkintilloch Rob Roy | 17 | 2 | 0 | 15 | 8 | 35 | −27 | 6 | 0.35 | All clubs joined the West of Scotland League |

Source: West Region SJFA
Rules for classification: 1) Points; 2) Goal difference; 3) Goals scored
(C) Champions

== Results ==
| Home \ Away | AUC | BEI | BNB | CLY | CMN | GLE | HUR | IVM | KLB | KWN | KRR | LRG | PLK | ROS | RUG | TRO |
|---|---|---|---|---|---|---|---|---|---|---|---|---|---|---|---|---|
| Auchinleck Talbot | — | 4–0 | 5–0 | 3–0 | | 4–1 | 1–1 | | 5–2 | 6–1 | | | 3–1 | | 2–1 | 8–1 |
| Beith | | — | | 0–0 | 2–1 | | 2–2 | 1–2 | 3–3 | 0–0 | | 3–0 | 2–5 | 4–2 | 4–1 | |
| Benburb | | 0–0 | — | 0–1 | | 1–1 | | 1–3 | 4–3 | 2–4 | 2–0 | | 1–1 | 0–1 | | 1–0 |
| Clydebank | 0–2 | 2–2 | 2–0 | — | 3–2 | 2–2 | 3–0 | 2–0 | 5–2 | 1–3 | 1–2 | 1–2 | 1–4 | 1–3 | 5–2 | 1–2 |
| Cumnock | | 1–3 | 5–3 | 2–0 | — | 1–2 | | 1–0 | 0–7 | 1–2 | 4–0 | 2–2 | 1–3 | 3–1 | 3–2 | |
| Glenafton Athletic | 3–0 | 4–1 | | 0–1 | 2–1 | — | | 1–1 | | 2–1 | 3–1 | 5–1 | | 1–2 | 2–1 | 3–1 |
| Hurlford United | | | | 0–0 | 0–0 | 2–0 | — | 1–2 | | 6–2 | 3–0 | 3–2 | 1–0 | 1–3 | | 2–1 |
| Irvine Meadow | | | 4–3 | | 2–0 | 2–3 | | — | 1–3 | 1–2 | 1–0 | 2–1 | 3–3 | 2–1 | | 3–1 |
| Kilbirnie Ladeside | | | 2–0 | | 0–0 | 1–0 | 0–2 | 1–2 | — | 1–2 | 2–1 | 2–1 | 1–0 | 2–1 | 3–0 | 4–3 |
| Kilwinning Rangers | 0–0 | | 1–0 | 2–1 | 3–1 | | 1–1 | 3–0 | 6–2 | — | | 3–0 | 0–3 | 1–0 | 2–2 | 3–2 |
| Kirkintilloch Rob Roy | | 0–2 | 0–2 | 1–2 | 0–2 | | | 0–1 | | | — | | | | 1–2 | |
| Largs Thistle | 3–4 | 1–1 | 3–2 | 2–3 | 3–1 | | 3–2 | 4–1 | 2–0 | 1–2 | 2–0 | — | 1–2 | 0–0 | 0–0 | 3–0 |
| Pollok | | 2–0 | | 2–1 | 0–1 | 2–3 | 2–0 | | 1–0 | 0–1 | 5–1 | 4–0 | — | 1–1 | | 4–0 |
| Rossvale | 1–2 | 2–4 | 0–2 | 1–2 | 2–3 | | 0–1 | 3–2 | 1–0 | | 0–1 | 1–0 | 0–3 | — | 4–2 | 1–0 |
| Rutherglen Glencairn | | 2–4 | | 2–1 | 2–2 | | | | 3–2 | 4–5 | | | | | — | |
| Troon | 0–2 | 1–2 | 3–3 | 2–0 | 1–1 | 4–1 | 4–1 | | 1–1 | 1–1 | 1–0 | 0–4 | | 1–2 | 1–0 | — |

Source: West Region SJFA
Legend: Blue = home team win; Yellow = draw; Red = away team win.
