= Lewis Morrison (footballer) =

Scottish footballer

Personal information
- Date of birth: 12 March 1999 (age 27)
- Place of birth: Irvine, Scotland
- Position: Forward

Team information
- Current team: Kilwinning Rangers

Youth career
- 2015–2017: Kilmarnock

Senior career*
Years	Team	Apps	(Gls)
2016–2017	Kilmarnock	1	(0)
2017	→ Kilwinning Rangers (loan)	?	(4)
2017	St Mirren	0	(0)
2017–2018	Hurlford United	1	(0)
2018	Sligo Rovers	24	(1)
2018–2022	Hurlford United	58	(21)
2022–2023	Darvel	34	(4)
2023	→ Hurlford United (loan)	10	(8)
2023-2026	Hurlford United	109	(55)
2026	Kilwinning Rangers	9	(6)

International career^{‡}
2015–2016	Scotland U17	12	(3)
- * Club domestic league appearances and goals as of 22:50, 15 September 2026 (UTC) ‡ National team caps and goals as of 22:38, 28 July 2026 (UTC)

Lewis Morrison (born 12 March 1999) is a Scottish footballer, who plays for Kilwinning Rangers in the Lowland Football League. He has previously played in the Scottish Premiership for Kilmarnock and with (at the time) West of Scotland League side Hurlford United.

== Club career ==
Morrison began his career at Kilmarnock and made his professional debut in the Scottish Premiership on 24 September 2016 in a game against Celtic. In March 2017, he was farmed out to his hometown club, Kilwinning Rangers, who play in the West of Scotland Super League Premier Division.

Morrison was released from his Kilmarnock contract before his loan period at Kilwinning expired, but joined St Mirren in the summer of 2017.

After leaving St Mirren in December 2017, Morrison had a short spell with Hurlford United before joining League of Ireland Premier Division side Sligo Rovers in January 2018. He returned to Hurlford in December 2018.

In March 2023, Morrison returned to Hurlford on loan from Darvel until the end of the 2022–2023 season.

Nine years after his loan spell with his hometown club, Morrison signed permanently with Kilwinning Rangers in May 2026.
