= Willie Knox =

Scottish footballer and manager (1937–2026)

Personal information
- Full name: William Jess Knox
- Date of birth: 9 September 1937
- Place of birth: Kilmarnock, Scotland
- Date of death: January 2026 (aged 88)
- Position: Wing half

Senior career*
Years	Team	Apps	(Gls)
- Annbank United
1955–1958	Raith Rovers	13	(0)
1958–1959	Third Lanark	0	(0)
1959	Barrow	1	(0)
1959–1963	Forfar Athletic	91	(4)
- Irvine Victoria

Managerial career
- 1977–1993: Auchinleck Talbot
- Cumnock Juniors
- Irvine Meadow XI
- * Club domestic league appearances and goals

William Jess Knox (9 September 1937 – January 2026) was a Scottish football player and manager, who played as a wing half. As a player, he appeared in the Scottish Football League for Raith Rovers and Forfar Athletic and in the Football League for Barrow. He went on to have a successful managerial career in Scottish junior football with Auchinleck Talbot, winning the Scottish Junior Cup five times, including three consecutive wins.

== Playing career ==
Willie Knox was born in Kilmarnock, Ayrshire, on 9 September 1937. He played in local junior football with Annbank United before beginning his senior career with Raith Rovers in 1955. He was with Raith for three years, making 13 league appearances in the top division of the Scottish Football League and playing alongside a young Jim Baxter. He was signed for Third Lanark in 1958 by manager Bob Shankly, but made no league appearances for them. He briefly played in England, joining Barrow in 1959 and playing a single Football League match, before returning to Scottish football with Forfar Athletic, his last senior club. He left Forfar in 1963 after making 91 league appearances and scoring 4 goals, returning to junior football in his native Ayrshire with Irvine Victoria.

== Managerial career ==
Knox was manager of Auchinleck Talbot between 1977 and 1993, during which time they won 43 trophies, including the Scottish Junior Cup five times in the space of seven seasons. In the 1986 final against Pollok, Knox demonstrated his apparent lack of concern at going 2–0 down early on by calmly eating an egg sandwich on the touchline; Auchinleck went on to win the match 3–2. They retained the trophy against Kilbirnie Ladeside in 1987 and then defeated Petershill in the 1988 final, becoming the first club to win the trophy in three consecutive seasons. Under Knox, Auchinleck also won consecutive Junior Cups in 1991 and 1992, against Newtongrange Star and Glenafton Athletic respectively. They also won the West of Scotland Junior Cup and the Ayrshire Junior Football League nine times each during this era.

After leaving Auchinleck, Knox managed their local rivals Cumnock Juniors, but didn't repeat his earlier success, with the team being relegated. He also had a spell managing the Scotland Junior international team, but left after one match due to disagreeing with the team selection process. He ended his managerial career with a few months at Irvine Meadow.

== Personal life and death ==
Knox lived in retirement in his home town of Kilmarnock along with Sheila, his wife. During this time he also helped to run a local youth team, Balmoral Boys Club.

Knox died in January 2026, at the age of 88.
