= Scottish Junior Football Association, West Region =

The Scottish Junior Football Association, West Region was one of three regions of the SJFA which organised its own distinct league and cup competitions.

The SJFA used to be split into six regions, but in 2002 they decided to reform into three (East, North and West) to try to ensure more games between the top clubs and hence increase their revenues. The region covered an area from Girvan in South Ayrshire to Denny in Central Scotland.

In 2020, the region was abolished, as all 63 clubs in the region decided to depart and join the newly-founded West of Scotland Football League.

== History ==
=== Foundation ===
Although the West Region was formed by the amalgamation of the Central and Ayrshire regions in 2002, a West of Scotland Junior FA had existed since the end of the Intermediate dispute in 1931 and administered the West of Scotland Cup since that time. The first phase of rationalisation in 1968 saw the Central Junior Football League (based around greater Glasgow and essentially a continuation of the Glasgow Junior Football League from 1895) merge with the even older Lanarkshire Junior Football League (1891) to create the Central region. The Western Junior League became the Ayrshire region, with Neilston Juniors and Dunoon Athletic transferring to the Central region.

=== Structure ===
From 2002 to 2018, the league set-up in the region was a combined top division, officially known as the SJFA West of Scotland Region Super League Premier Division (12 teams), with the West of Scotland Region Super League First Division (14 teams) below. There were two district leagues below that provided the First Division with two clubs each at the end of the season. These corresponded to the former two regions that combined to create the new West region: there was a Central District League (with two divisions) and an Ayrshire District League, with the four teams relegated from the First Division assigned to their historic region. Although Ayrshire only had one division, clubs were also promoted between the two divisions of the Central District League.

In 2017 West Region clubs voted to organise all leagues on a regionwide basis and as a result, the Super League Premier Division was rebranded as the West Region Premiership for the 2018–19 season and featured 16 clubs. Clubs were relegated to a rebranded Championship also made up of 16 teams. The Ayrshire and Central district leagues were scrapped and replaced by League One and Two consisting of 16 and 15 teams respectively.

=== End of an era ===
In 2020, as part of a long process of negotiation to form an integrated footballing pyramid structure, all 63 West Region Junior clubs decided to depart and join the newly-founded West of Scotland Football League, a feeder to the Lowland Football League.

== Member clubs ==
Towards the end of the 2019–20 campaign, the coronavirus pandemic interrupted the season and caused the West Region leagues to be curtailed, with champions later declared on a 'points per game' basis by the West Region management committee. At that time there were 63 member clubs in the setup.

=== SJFA West Region Premiership ===
Club	Location	Home Ground	Finishing position 2019–20
Auchinleck Talbot	Auchinleck	Beechwood Park	1st
Beith Juniors	Beith	Bellsdale Park	6th
Benburb F.C.	Glasgow	New Tinto Park	13th
Clydebank	Clydebank	Holm Park	9th
Cumnock Juniors	Cumnock	Townhead Park	10th
Glenafton Athletic	New Cumnock	Loch Park	4th
Hurlford United	Hurlford	Blair Park	7th
Irvine Meadow	Irvine	Meadow Park	5th
Kilbirnie Ladeside	Kilbirnie	Valefield Park	8th
Kilwinning Rangers	Kilwinning	Abbey Park	2nd
Kirkintilloch Rob Roy	Cumbernauld	Guy's Meadow (Note: Kirkintilloch Rob Roy ground-shared with Cumbernauld United.)	16th
Largs Thistle	Largs	Barrfields Stadium	12th
Pollok	Glasgow	Newlandsfield Park	3rd
Rossvale	Glasgow	New Tinto Park (Note: Rossvale ground-shared with Benburb.)	11th
Rutherglen Glencairn	Rutherglen	New Southcroft Park	15th
Troon	Troon	Portland Park	14th

=== SJFA West Region Championship ===
Club	Location	Home Ground	Finishing position 2019–20
Arthurlie	Barrhead	Dunterlie Park	9th
Blantyre Victoria	Blantyre	KG Stadium	1st=
Cambuslang Rangers	Cambuslang	Somervell Park	14th
Craigmark Burntonians	Dalmellington	Station Park	15th
Cumbernauld United	Cumbernauld	Guy's Meadow	3rd
Dalry Thistle	Dalry	Merksworth Park	8th
Darvel Juniors	Darvel	Recreation Park	1st=
Gartcairn Juniors	Airdrie	MTC Park	11th
Irvine Victoria	Irvine	Victoria Park	16th
Kilsyth Rangers	Kilsyth	Duncansfield Park	7th
Neilston Juniors	Neilston	Brig O' Lea Stadium	6th
Petershill	Glasgow	Petershill Park	13th
Renfrew	Renfrew	New Western Park	5th
Shotts Bon Accord	Shotts	Hannah Park	4th
St Roch's	Glasgow	James McGrory Park	12th
Whitletts Victoria	Ayr	Dam Park	10th

=== SJFA West Region League One ===
Club	Location	Home Ground	Finishing position 2019–20
Ardrossan Winton Rovers	Ardrossan	Winton Park	2nd
Bellshill Athletic	Bellshill	Rockburn Park	6th
Carluke Rovers	Carluke	John Cumming Stadium	10th
East Kilbride Thistle	East Kilbride	The Showpark	15th
Girvan	Girvan	Hamilton Park	11th
Glasgow Perthshire	Possilpark, Glasgow	Keppoch Park	8th
Greenock Juniors	Greenock	Ravenscraig Stadium	7th
Kello Rovers	Kirkconnel	Nithside Park	13th
Lanark United	Lanark	Moor Park	3rd
Larkhall Thistle	Larkhall	Gasworks Park	9th
Lesmahagow	Lesmahagow	Craighead Park	5th
Maryhill	Maryhill	Lochburn Park	12th
Port Glasgow	Port Glasgow	Parklea Community Stadium	4th
Royal Albert	Stonehouse	Tilework Park	16th
Shettleston	Shettleston	Greenfield Park	1st
Wishaw Juniors	Wishaw	Beltane Park	14th

=== SJFA West Region League Two ===
Club	Location	Home Ground	Finishing position 2019–20
Annbank United	Annbank	New Pebble Park	9th
Ardeer Thistle	Stevenston	Ardeer Stadium	15th
Ashfield	Possilpark, Glasgow	Saracen Park	3rd
Forth Wanderers	Forth	Kingshill Park	7th
Johnstone Burgh	Johnstone	Keanie Park	1st
Lugar Boswell Thistle	Lugar	Rosebank Park	14th
Maybole	Maybole	Ladywell Stadium	8th
Muirkirk	Muirkirk	Burnside Park	2nd
Newmains United	Newmains	Victoria Park	12th
Saltcoats Victoria	Saltcoats	Campbell Park	13th
St Anthony's	Cardonald	McKenna Park	11th
Thorniewood United	Viewpark	Robertson Park	6th
Vale of Clyde	Tollcross	Fullarton Park	10th
Vale of Leven	Alexandria	Millburn Park	4th
Yoker Athletic	Clydebank	Holm Park	5th

== Cup competitions ==
The West Region organised several cup competitions for member clubs:

- West of Scotland Cup: This was a knockout tournament for all West Region clubs. The competition originated as the Scottish Intermediate Cup in 1927–28 and was renamed The West of Scotland Cup following the ending of the Intermediate dispute in 1931.
- Sectional League Cup: Introduced for the 2018–19 season as a combination of the Central and Ayrshire sectional league cups, clubs competed in eight regional groups with the group winners progressing to the knockout stages.
- Evening Times Champions Cup: This was a knockout tournament played at the end of the season between the winners of the four or five West Region league competitions during the preceding season. The champions of the Ayrshire District League and Central District Second Division played in a preliminary round tie with the winners of that game joining the other three clubs at the semi-final stage. The Evening Times trophy was first presented in 1896–97 to the winners of the Glasgow Junior League and has been awarded to the winners of various competitions over the years. Between 2003 and 2012, the competition involved all ten league and cup winners in the West Region and was known as the Evening Times Cup Winners Cup.

Pre-2018 competitions

- Central League Cup. This was a knockout tournament for former Central Region clubs in the West Region. It was first played for in 1921–22 when known as the Glasgow Junior League Cup.
- Ayrshire Cup. This was a knockout tournament for former Ayrshire Region clubs in the West Region. The tournament originated in 1889–90 as the Ayrshire Junior Challenge Cup and was won for the first three seasons by Glenbuck Cherrypickers.
- Central Sectional League Cup. This tournament was for former Central Region clubs and was the opening competition of the season. Clubs initially competed in eight groups (sections) with the group winners advancing to a knockout competition. Based geographically, the groups comprised the same clubs each season. Matches in the group stages were played under league rules so a player was not cup-tied by turning out for a particular club.
- Ayrshire Sectional League Cup. This tournament was for former Ayrshire Region clubs. Clubs initially competed in four groups (sections) with group winners and runners up advancing to the knockout stages, otherwise the format was the same as that of the Central Sectional League Cup

=== Holders ===
2018–19 winners unless stated.

- West of Scotland Cup: - Beith Juniors
- Sectional League Cup: Auchinleck Talbot (2019–20)
- Evening Times Champions Cup: (2017–18)
- Central League Cup: Pollok (2017–18)
- Ayrshire Cup: Kilwinning Rangers (2017–18)
- Central Sectional League Cup: Clydebank (2017–18)
- Ayrshire Sectional League Cup: Auchinleck Talbot (2017–18)
- Clydesdale Cup: Lesmahagow

== Roll of Honour ==
Season	West Super League Premier Division	West Super League First Division	Ayrshire District League	Central District League First Division	Central District League Second Division
2002–03	Pollok	Arthurlie	Lugar Boswell Thistle	Kilsyth Rangers	St Anthony's
2003–04	Kilwinning Rangers	Bellshill Athletic	Maybole	Cambuslang Rangers	Clydebank
2004–05	Pollok (2)	Kilsyth Rangers	Largs Thistle	Vale of Clyde	Lanark United
2005–06	Auchinleck Talbot	Neilston Juniors	Irvine Meadow	Lesmahagow	Blantyre Victoria
2006–07	Pollok (3)	Irvine Meadow	Kilbirnie Ladeside	Kirkintilloch Rob Roy	Ashfield
2007–08	Pollok (4)	Kirkintilloch Rob Roy	Hurlford United	Port Glasgow	Vale of Leven
2008–09	Irvine Meadow	Largs Thistle	Dalry Thistle	Rutherglen Glencairn	Blantyre Victoria
2009–10	Beith Juniors	Rutherglen Glencairn	Hurlford United	Cumbernauld United	Johnstone Burgh
2010–11	Irvine Meadow (2)	Ashfield	Ardrossan Winton Rovers	Kilsyth Rangers	Yoker Athletic
2011–12	Irvine Meadow (3)	Glenafton Athletic	Maybole	Glasgow Perthshire	Carluke Rovers
2012–13	Auchinleck Talbot (2)	Hurlford United	Kilwinning Rangers	Greenock Juniors	Cambuslang Rangers
2013–14	Auchinleck Talbot (3)	Troon	Irvine Victoria	Neilston Juniors	Blantyre Victoria
2014–15	Auchinleck Talbot (4)	Pollok	Ardrossan Winton Rovers	Blantyre Victoria	Rossvale
2015–16	Auchinleck Talbot (5)	Cumnock Juniors	Girvan	Renfrew	Forth Wanderers
2016–17	Glenafton Athletic	Girvan	Darvel Juniors	Cambuslang Rangers	Glasgow Perthshire
2017–18	Beith Juniors (2)	Petershill	Dalry Thistle	Rossvale	Royal Albert

Season	West Premiership	West Championship	West League One	West League Two
2018–19	Auchinleck Talbot (6)	Rutherglen Glencairn	Gartcairn Juniors	Lanark United
2019–20 (Note: Season suspended in March 2020 due to the coronavirus pandemic. Champions calculated using 'points per game' algorithm, announced on 21 April.)	Auchinleck Talbot (7)	Blantyre Victoria / Darvel (shared)	Shettleston	Johnstone Burgh
