= Darren Henderson =

Scottish footballer and manager

Personal information
- Full name: Darren Ronald Henderson
- Date of birth: 12 October 1966 (age 60)
- Place of birth: Kilmarnock, Scotland
- Height: 1.80 m (5 ft 11 in)
- Position: Midfielder

Team information
- Current team: Hurlford United (manager)

Senior career*
Years	Team	Apps	(Gls)
1986–1987	Clyde	28	(2)
1987–1992	Stranraer	141	(31)
1992–1993	Clydebank	5	(1)
1992–1993	Queen of the South	26	(9)
1993–1996	Stranraer	77	(13)
1996–1998	Ayr United	61	(6)
1998–2000	Hamilton Academical	52	(9)
2000–2001	Ross County	24	(6)
2001–2002	Raith Rovers	29	(3)
2002–2004	Forfar Athletic	50	(5)
2004–2005	Ayr United	29	(1)
2005–2007	Cumnock Juniors		
2007	Stenhousemuir	8	(0)
2007–2008	Cumnock Juniors		
2009–2010	Dalry Thistle		
Total		530	(86)

Managerial career
- 2010–2011: Dalry Thistle
- 2011–2013: Glenafton Athletic
- 2013–: Hurlford United
- * Club domestic league appearances and goals

Darren Henderson (born 12 October 1966) is a Scottish former footballer. He made over 500 appearances in the Scottish Football League over a 21-year senior career and is currently the manager of Hurlford United in the Scottish Junior Football Association, West Region.

== Career ==
After his long career in the Scottish Football League, Henderson joined Cumnock Juniors as a player-coach where he teamed up with former Ayr United and Stenhousemuir colleague Campbell Money. He played in Cumnock's 2008 Scottish Junior Cup final defeat to Bathgate Thistle at the age of 41.

Henderson took another player-coach role at Dalry Thistle before becoming manager in his own right in November 2010. He led the club to promotion and the semi-finals of the Scottish Junior Cup before moving on to Glenafton Athletic the following summer.

In two successful seasons at Glenafton, Henderson won promotion to the West Super League Premier Division and the West of Scotland Cup before leaving the club to join Hurlford United in June 2013.

== Personal life ==
His son Jay is also a footballer.

== See also ==
- List of footballers in Scotland by number of league appearances (500+)
