= Tommy Sloan (footballer, born 1964) =

Scottish footballer and manager

Personal information
- Full name: Thomas Sloan
- Date of birth: 24 August 1964 (age 62)
- Place of birth: Irvine, Scotland
- Position: Striker

Team information
- Current team: Auchinleck Talbot (manager)

Senior career*
| Years | Team | Apps | (Gls) |
- Annbank United
| 1983 | Stranraer (trial) | 1 | (0) |
| 1983–1986 | Ayr United | 24 | (4) |
| 1986–1989 | Annbank United | | |
| 1989–1990 | Queen of the South | 66 | (12) |
| 1990–1991 | Kilmarnock | 7 | (1) |
| 1991–1997 | Stranraer | 211 | (59) |
- Kilwinning Rangers
- Ardrossan Winton Rovers
| 2003–11 | Auchinleck Talbot | | |
| Total | | 309 | (76) |

Managerial career
- 2003–: Auchinleck Talbot
- * Club domestic league appearances and goals as of 09:03, 27 April 2017 (UTC)

Thomas Sloan (born 24 August 1964), is a Scottish former footballer who played as a striker for several clubs in the Scottish Football League. He is currently the manager of Auchinleck Talbot with whom he has won the Scottish Junior Cup on seven occasions.

== Career ==
Born in Irvine, Sloan began his career at Junior level with his hometown club Annbank United. After a single appearance for Stranraer as a trialist, he joined Ayr United for a spell before dropping back into Junior football with Annbank. Stepping up a second time in 1988, this time to Queen of the South, Sloan later moved to Kilmarnock before joining Stranraer on a permanent basis in 1991 under manager Alex McAnespie. During a successful six years at Stair Park, he made over 200 league appearances, helping the club to the Scottish League Division Two title in 1993–94, and winning the 1996–97 Scottish Challenge Cup. These were Stranraer's first ever league promotion and national cup honour respectively.

Dropping back again to Junior level, he joined Kilwinning Rangers in 1997, winning the Scottish Junior Cup in 1999. Sloan later moved to Ardrossan Winton Rovers, where he played alongside his son Tommy Jr. With his playing career winding down, Sloan was assisting Campbell Money with youth coaching at Ayr United and turned down his first opportunity to become manager of Auchinleck. He eventually joined the club as player-coach in 2003 under Tam McDonald, and stepped up to the managers role the same year. After avoiding relegation in 2003 on the last day of the season, he has guided Talbot to five Scottish Junior Cup victories and five Super League titles, including the league and cup double in 2006 and 2015.

Throughout his career, he has been known by the nickname "Tucker".

== Playing honours ==
=== Stranraer ===
Scottish Challenge Cup

- 1996–97

Scottish League Division Two

- 1993–94

=== Kilwinning Rangers ===
Scottish Junior Cup

- 1998–99

== Managerial honours ==
=== Auchinleck Talbot ===
Scottish Junior Cup

- 2006, 2009, 2011, 2013, 2015, 2018, 2019, 2022

West Premier Division / Premiership

- 2005–06, 2012–13, 2013–14, 2014–15, 2015–16, 2018–19, 2019–20

== See also ==
- List of football managers with the most matches
