= Auchinleck Talbot F.C. =

Association football club in East Ayrshire, Scotland

Auchinleck Talbot
- Full name: Auchinleck Talbot Football Club
- Nickname: The Bot
- Founded: 1909; 117 years ago
- Ground: Beechwood Park, Auchinleck
- Capacity: 4,000 (500 seated)
- Coordinates: 55.4682°N 4.2911°W
- President: Morton Wright
- Manager: Tommy Sloan
- League: Lowland League West
- 2025–26: West of Scotland League Premier Division, 1st of 16 (promoted)
Home colours	Away colours

Auchinleck Talbot Football Club is a Scottish football club based in Auchinleck, East Ayrshire. They currently play in the Lowland League West.

The club is also a member of the Scottish Junior Football Association, and have won the Scottish Junior Cup on a record 14 occasions. They compete in a local derby against near neighbours and biggest rivals Cumnock Juniors.

== History ==
Auchinleck Talbot was formed in 1909 and take their name from the 2nd Baron Talbot de Malahide, Richard Wogan Talbot, a landowner who donated the site of their Beechwood Park home.

Beechwood Park opened in 1909 with a charity match between The Old Players and The Merchants. Talbot made their team debut the same year when they defeat the juvenile side Highhouse Rangers 4–0. Weeks later they lost their first competitive game at Cronberry Eglinton in the league. Their first win came in September 1909 when they defeated Patna Doon Athletic in their first Scottish Junior Cup tie.

The early and middle history of the club is characterised by periods of fluctuating fortune, often related to the economic conditions in this coal mining district of rural Ayrshire. Talbot folded in 1916 due to financial problems and the First World War but made a comeback four years later, ushering in a relatively successful period for the club. The Ayrshire Cup was won in 1920 by defeating Irvine Meadow 3–0 at Rugby Park. That same year they set a club goalscoring record in the Scottish Junior Cup, defeating Craigbank 11–0 at home, a scoreline surpassed in 2008 when defeating Nairn St. Ninian, 13–1. The South Ayrshire League was won for the first time in 1921 and the following year, a terrace was raised at Beechwood Park to accommodate larger crowds ahead of a Junior Cup quarter-final tie against the eventual winners, a Jimmy McGrory inspired St Roch's. Talbot made their first foray to the semi-finals of this tournament in 1924, losing 1–0 to Baillieston at Love Street. In the 1928–29 season however, the club were forced into abeyance due to financial difficulties.

Restarting the next year, Talbot suffered a lean decade through the 1930s until a second Ayrshire Cup victory arrived in 1939. The club closed down for the duration of World War II but on resuming after hostilities, they enjoyed another successful spell, winning five trophies in 1947–48 including the first of twelve West of Scotland Cups before lifting the Scottish Junior Cup for the first time in 1949. The 3–2 victory over Petershill at Hampden Park was watched by a then record crowd of 68,837 and it remains the third highest attendance at a Junior Cup final. Talbot's first defence of the trophy drew a record crowd to Beechwood Park when 10,000 people saw Irvine Meadow knock the holders out in the 3rd round. The ground was expanded for the occasion with thousands of tons of mining spoil added to build up the terracing and the "bing" was a feature of the park for a number of years.

By the end of the 1950s, the club's fortunes were again on the wane and the 60s was a down-at-heel decade of little success, with a constant battle being fought against vandalism at the ground. This culminated in the pavilion being burned down in 1972. Around this time, Talbot also suffered their record defeat, a humiliating 11–0 reverse at the hands of arch local rivals Cumnock Juniors. From the depths of despair however, a new resolve emerged. A public meeting on the future of the club infused Talbot with new blood. The clubhouse was rebuilt and onfield performances improved under a new manager, Jimsie Kirkland.

Willie Knox, a former Raith Rovers and Forfar wing half, was appointed as manager in 1977 and an unprecedented era of success for the club began. The Ayrshire League was won in Knox's first season and in 1979, Talbot's hegemony over the West of Scotland Cup began with the first of nine victories in eleven years. The Scottish Junior Cup proved initially elusive with two successive semi-final losses in 1983 and '84 before Talbot defeated Pollok 3–2 in the Junior Cup Centenary final of 1986, coming back from 2–0 down after fifteen minutes of the game. The club followed up with Junior Cup final victories against Kilbirnie Ladeside in 1987 (after a replay), and Petershill in 1988, becoming the first and so far, only club to win the tournament three times in a row. Talbot added a further two Junior Cup wins under Knox in 1991 and 1992 and when he stepped down as manager in 1993, the number of trophies accumulated under his 16-year tenure stood at 43.

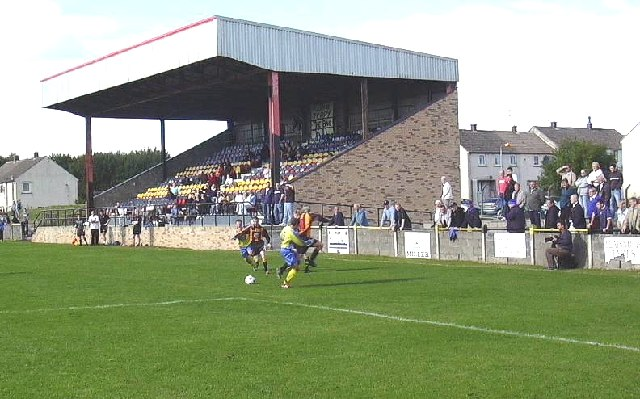
Matchday action at Beechwood Park

Talbot made their seventh Junior Cup final appearance in 2002 under the management of Tam McDonald, a player in the 1980s three-in-a-row side, but lost on the big day for the first time to Linlithgow Rose. Tommy Sloan had joined the club from Kilwinning Rangers as a player–coach under McDonald in 2003 and he stepped up to the managers role later that year, assisted firstly by Iain Jardine, then by Allan McLuckie. Sloan has led the club to a further seven Scottish finals, winning five times. His first victory in 2006 against Bathgate Thistle also comprised one half of a Super League and Junior Cup double, a feat to be repeated in 2015. After escaping relegation on the final day in his first season, Sloan has established Talbot as the preeminent force in the West Super League with the club winning four successive league titles from 2012–13 onwards, and five in total.

Off the field, Beechwood Park has also been improved in recent years. A building sub-committee formed in 1989 oversaw the purchase of the Main Stand extension from Hamilton Accies old Douglas Park ground for £30,000 in the 1990s and the 460 seat structure was finally opened around 10 years later. The building committee was subsumed into a larger Beechwood Regeneration Committee in 2013 who continue to upgrade facilities. The club have also been accredited with the Scottish Football Association "Standard" Quality Mark award since 2012.

In the eventually cancelled 2019–20 season, a bizarre incident occurred, where Talbot, who were sitting 3rd place, and 12 points off the leaders, Kilwinning Rangers, were awarded the league title. However the debacle was quickly resolved by clearing up that the league was decided on a Points Per Game ratio, rather than calling it as it stood.

In 2020, Talbot moved from the SJFA, to join the pyramid system in Scottish football as one of the inaugural members of the West of Scotland Football League.

On 11 October 2020, the club announced it would not participate in the inaugural West of Scotland League season due to concerns relating to the COVID-19 pandemic.

== Scottish Junior Cup finals record ==
Talbot's record in the Scottish Junior Cup is the best of any club by some considerable distance. The 2021–22 final was their 17th appearance at this stage of the competition, ahead of Cambuslang Rangers (11 final appearances) and Petershill (10 appearances). In terms of cup victories, the margin is more marked. Talbot's 14 Junior Cup wins is more than double the total of the next best clubs, Cambuslang Rangers, Parkhead and Petershill, who have all won the tournament five times.

Season	Opponent	Result
1948–49	Petershill	3–2
1985–86	Pollok	3–2
1986–87	Kilbirnie Ladeside	1–0 (after 1–1 draw)
1987–88	Petershill	1–0
1990–91	Newtongrange Star	1–0
1991–92	Glenafton Athletic	4–0
2001–02	Linlithgow Rose	0–1
2005–06	Bathgate Thistle	2–1
2008–09	Clydebank	2–1
2010–11	Musselburgh Athletic	2–1 (after extra time)
2011–12	Shotts Bon Accord	1–2
2012–13	Linlithgow Rose	1–0
2014–15	Musselburgh Athletic	2–1
2016–17	Glenafton Athletic	1–2
2017–18	Hurlford United	3–2
2018–19	Largs Thistle	2–0
2021–22	Yoker Athletic	2–0

== Participation in the Scottish Cup ==
Season	Progress	Opposition	Score
2009–10	Third round	Stirling Albion (a)	1–2
2011–12	Fourth round	Heart of Midlothian (a)	0–1
2013–14	Third round	Stranraer (a), (h)	2–2, 2–3
2014–15	Second round	Edinburgh City (a)	1–2
2015–16	Second round	Cumbernauld Colts (a)	0–2
2016–17	Preliminary round 2	Beith Juniors (a), (h)	2–2, 0–3
2018–19	Fifth round	Heart of Midlothian (a)	0–4
2019–20	Third round	Arbroath (h), (a)	1–1, 0–3
2021–22	Fourth round	Heart of Midlothian (h)	0–5
2022–23	Third round	Raith Rovers (a)	0–3
2023–24	First round	St Andrews United (a)	0–1
2025–26	Fourth round	Celtic (h)	0–2

Since the 2007–08 season, a Junior club which wins the Scottish Junior Cup or one of the three regional Superleague competitions is eligible to compete in the following season's Senior Scottish Cup.

Talbot's victory over Clydebank in the 2009 Junior Cup final saw them enter the Senior tournament for the first time in 2009–10. The club was drawn at home to Highland League side Fort William in their first ever tie, winning the match 7–0. Talbot then defeated Huntly after a replay before eventually losing to Stirling Albion in the third round.

In their first three years of qualification, Talbot went out to League opposition although they took Stranraer to a replay in 2013–14. Their greatest run until that point had come two years before, when the club reached the fourth round and faced Scottish Premier League side Hearts at Tynecastle Stadium, losing narrowly 1–0. The club took over 2,000 supporters to Edinburgh for the occasion. Hearts would go on to win the cup.

In 2018–19, the club extended their longest run in front of 3,100 crowd at home with a 1–0 fourth round win over Championship side Ayr United; this victory was their first against full-time opponents.

== Former players ==
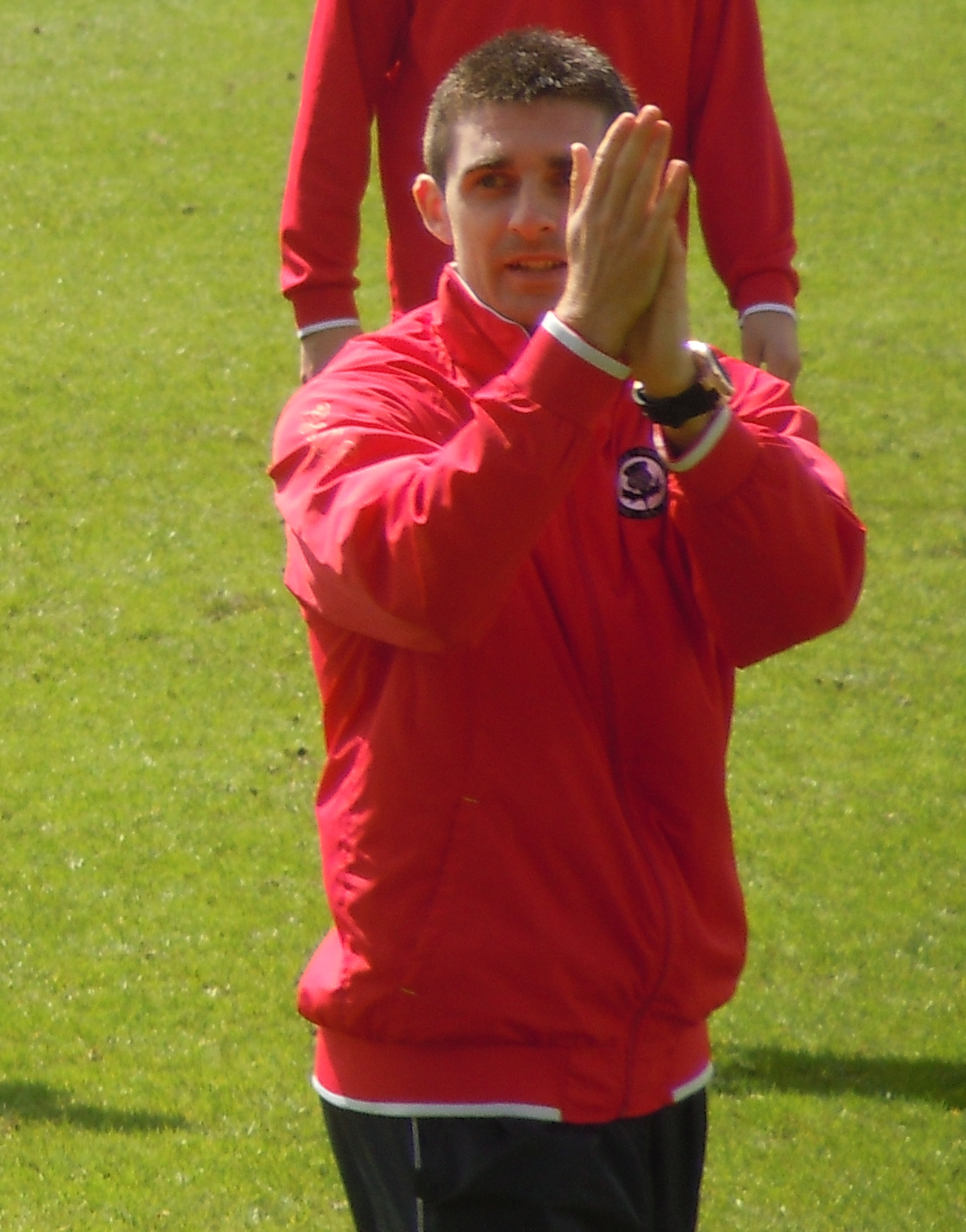
Striker Kris Doolan, noted for his technical ability and first touch, has become one of Partick Thistle's highest goal scorers.

Talbot have seen a number of players step up to Senior football over the years, although the club was not as prolific a nursery as some Junior sides. Two Auchinleck men who moved from their local club to the professional game are Hugh Robertson and Kris Doolan.

Winger Robertson was signed by Willie Thornton for Dundee from Talbot in 1957 at the age of 17 while working as a miner at Barony Colliery. He was a member of the Dark Blues League title winning side in 1961–62 managed by Bob Shankly and their subsequent European campaigns including an 8–1 rout of FC Cologne at Dens Park. Robertson was capped once for Scotland in a November 1961 World Cup qualification play-off against Czechoslovakia, setting up both Scotland goals for Ian St John in a 4–2 defeat. Shankly himself played for Talbot for a season in 1929 before joining his own local club, the famous Glenbuck Cherrypickers.

Kris Doolan was an established player with Kello Rovers when Tommy Sloan signed him for his hometown club aged 20 in 2007. His form at Beechwood earned him recognition at Junior international level for Scotland, winning three caps in the 2008 Junior International Quadrangular Tournament held in the Isle of Man. After a season and a half at Talbot, Doolan signed for Partick Thistle in January 2009 after a successful trial and has gone on to be the club's fourth equal highest goal scorer of all time.

== Players and staff ==
=== Current squad ===
As of 2 July 2026

Note: Flags indicate national team as defined under FIFA eligibility rules; some limited exceptions apply. Players may hold more than one non-FIFA nationality.

No.	Pos.	Nation	Player
—	GK	SCO	Corey Armour (on loan from Kilmarnock)
—	GK	SCO	Greig Thackray (on loan from Rangers)
—	GK	SCO	Ollie Ercepont (on loan from Ayr United)
—	DF	SCO	Aiden Clocherty
—	DF	SCO	Euan Bowie (on loan from Kilmarnock)
—	DF	SCO	Euan Thomson
—	DF	SCO	Gareth Armstrong (captain)
—	DF	SCO	Kieran Wood
—	DF	SCO	Neill McPherson
—	DF	IRQ	Tarek Abed
—	DF	SCO	Aiden Wilson
—	DF	SCO	Jay Gillies

No.	Pos.	Nation	Player
—	DF	SCO	Lyle Wark (on loan from Rangers)
—	MF	SCO	Grant Clark
—	MF	SCO	Lewis Latona
—	MF	SCO	Austin Sime
—	MF	SCO	Ruaridh Langan
—	MF	SCO	Luke Main
—	MF	SCO	Ross Smith
—	MF	SCO	Ewan Thomson
—	MF	SCO	Marc Capaldi
—	FW	SCO	Connor Boyd
—	FW	SCO	Ethan Brew

=== Coaching staff ===
Position	Name
Manager	Tommy Sloan
Assistant Manager	Allan McLuckie
Goalkeeper Coach	Brian Hewitt

== Honours ==
- Scottish Junior Cup
  - Winners (15): 1949, 1986, 1987, 1988, 1991, 1992, 2006, 2009, 2011, 2012–13, 2014–15, 2017–18, 2018–19, 2021–22, 2025–26
- West of Scotland Football League Premier Division
  - Winners: 2025-26
- South Challenge Cup
  - Winners: 2021–22
- SJFA West Region Super League Premier Division / Premiership
  - Champions (7): 2005–06, 2012–13, 2013–14, 2014–15, 2015–16, 2018–19, 2019–20
- West of Scotland Cup
  - Winners (12): 1947–48, 1978–79, 1979–80, 1980–81, 1981–82, 1983–84, 1984–85, 1985–86, 1987–88, 1988–89, 2013–14, 2015–16
- West of Scotland League Cup
  - Winners: 2022–23, 2024-25
- Sectional League Cup
  - Winners: 2018–19
- Ayrshire First Division
  - Champions (11): 1977–78, 1978–79, 1979–80, 1985–86, 1986–87, 1987–88, 1989–90, 1990–91, 1991–92, 1994–95, 1996–97
- Ayrshire Cup
  - Winners (15): 1920, 1939, 1956, 1979, 1980, 1982, 1983, 1988, 1994, 1996, 1997, 2005, 2011, 2012, 2017
- Ayrshire League Cup
  - Winners (11): 1977–78, 1989–90, 1990–91, 1992–93, 1997–98, 2002–03, 2006–07, 2007–08, 2010–11, 2011–12, 2017–18
- Evening Times League Champions Cup
  - Winners: 2013, 2014, 2016
- Ayrshire District Cup
  - Winners (7): 1948, 1981, 1983, 1985, 1989, 1992, 1997
- Cumnock & Doon Valley Cup
  - Winners (4): 1991, 1993, 1994, 1995
- East Ayrshire Cup
  - Winners (4): 1997, 1999, 2000, 2002
- Ayrshire Super Cup
  - Winners (5): 1993, 1994, 1995, 1999, 2000
