= Bellsdale Park =

Football ground in Beith, Scotland

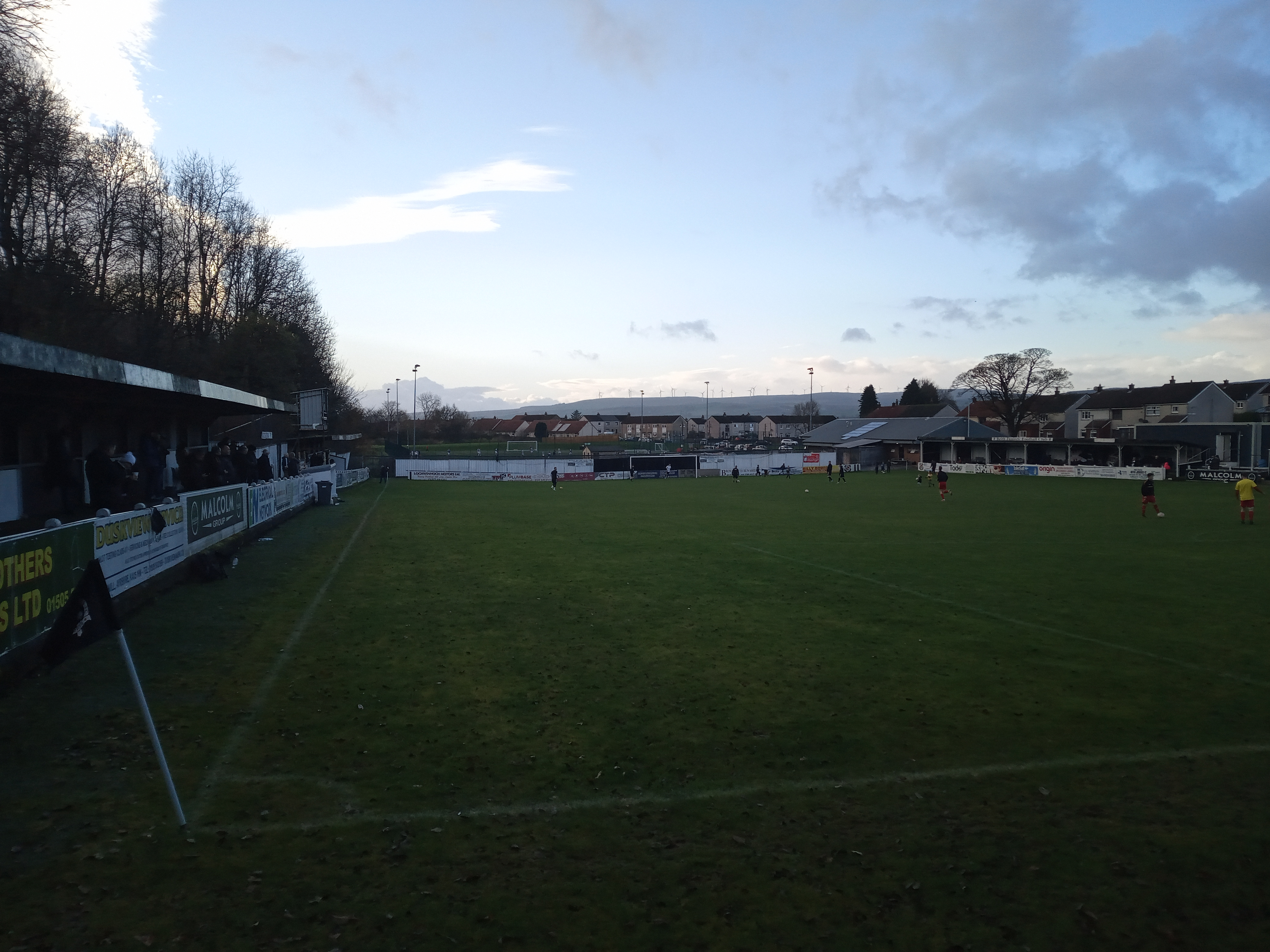
- Bellsdale Park during a game between Beith Juniors and Rossvale

- Location within North Ayrshire
- Location: Beith, Scotland
- Coordinates: 55.7507°N 4.6361°W
- Capacity: 1,500
- Surface: Grass

Construction
- Opened: 1920

Tenants
- Beith F.C. (1920–1938); Beith Juniors (1938–)

Bellsdale Park is a football ground in Beith, Scotland. It was the home ground of Beith F.C. during their time in the Scottish Football League, and is currently the home ground of Beith Juniors.

== History ==
Beith moved to Bellsdale Park in 1920, and a 280-seat stand was built on the northern side of the pitch later in the decade. The club were elected into the new Third Division of the SFL in 1923, and the first SFL match at Bellsdale Park was played on 25 August 1923, a 1–0 win over Royal Albert.

The ground was twice used as a home ground by other clubs; Galston were forced to play a home match against Arthurlie at Bellsdale Park on 22 March 1924 (a 3–0 win for Arthurlie) after their Portland Park ground was unavailable. Arthurlie subsequently played two home matches at Bellsdale Park in 1925 after their Dunterlie Park ground was closed due to crowd trouble; a 4–0 win over Broxburn United on 19 September and a 4–1 win over East Stirlingshire on 3 October.

The Third Division was disbanded at the end of the 1925–26 season, with the final SFL match at the ground being played on 21 April 1926, a 4–2 defeat by Leith Athletic. When Beith were transformed into Beith Juniors in 1938, the new club continued to use the ground.
