= Lochburn Park =

Football stadium in Glasgow, Scotland

- Location within Glasgow council area
- Location: Lochburn Road, Maryhill, Glasgow; Scotland
- Coordinates: 55.8911°N 4.2891°W
- Owner: Maryhill F.C.
- Capacity: 1800 (205 seated)
- Surface: Grass

Tenants
- Maryhill F.C.; BSC Glasgow F.C. (2014–2016); Clydebank F.C. (2018–2019)

Lochburn Park is a football stadium in the Maryhill area of Glasgow, Scotland. It is the home ground Maryhill F.C. of the Scottish Junior Football Association West Region, who have played there since the late 19th century.

The ground is tightly hemmed in by light industrial units, with just one corner access point and a sunken-level pitch. It was built on the site of a former quarry and was previously home to the Kelvin Dock Curling Club. After buying Maryhill in 1989, local businessman Freddie Duda invested £700,000 to make Lochburn Park one of the most developed grounds in junior football, adding floodlights, a seated stand and a gym with sauna.

The ground was also shared by BSC Glasgow of the Scottish Lowland Football League between 2014 and 2016. Maryhill shared Lochburn with fellow junior club Clydebank during the 2018–19 season while redevelopment work took place at Clydebank's regular home ground, Holm Park. Lochburn Park has also hosted one of the biggest Scottish Cup upset's ever when Drumchapel United beat F.C. Edinburgh 1-0 on 25 November 2022.
