= Campbell Money =

Scottish footballer and manager

Personal information
- Full name: Israel Campbell Money
- Date of birth: 31 August 1960 (age 66)
- Place of birth: Maybole, Ayrshire, Scotland
- Position: Goalkeeper

Youth career
- 1978–1981: St Mirren

Senior career*
Years	Team	Apps	(Gls)
1981–1996	St Mirren	336	(2)

International career
1987–1988	Scotland U21	3	(0)
1990	Scotland B	1	(0)
1990	SFA (SFL centenary)	1	(0)

Managerial career
- 1996–1999: Stranraer
- 2002–2004: Ayr United
- 2006–2007: Stenhousemuir
- 2008–2009: Cumnock
- * Club domestic league appearances and goals

Israel Campbell Money (born 31 August 1960 in Maybole, Ayrshire) is a Scottish former football goalkeeper and manager. A one-club man, Money spent his entire playing career keeping goal for St Mirren. In 1996 he moved into management, taking charge of Scottish Football League sides Stranraer, Ayr United and Stenhousemuir. His final managerial position was at Cumnock of the Scottish Junior Football West Premier League, which he held from 2008 to 2009.

== Playing career ==
Money started his senior career with St Mirren, whom he joined from Dailly Amateurs in 1978. As a result of his move to full-time football he was obliged to give up a career in the police force. He made his debut on 1 August 1978 when selected to face a Southampton side containing stars such as Peter Osgood and Ted McDougall. However the presence of established goalkeeper, Billy Thomson, limited his appearances at Love Street until 1984, when Thomson switched teams and joined Dundee United.

Money became Saints' regular goalkeeper and became a fans favourite for his part in the side's 1987 Scottish Cup win. He played in over 400 matches for the club and holds a record for playing in the most European games, eight in total. He is also their all-time top scoring goalkeeper with penalties in December 1992 against Cowdenbeath and Clydebank.

=== International ===
Widely considered one of St Mirren's best ever goalkeepers, he earned selection to several Scotland national team squads without ever earning a cap. He did play for the under-21s as an overage player, and was selected once by Scotland B in 1990, replacing Bryan Gunn in a goalless draw against Yugoslavia.

== Managerial career ==
In the later years of his career, Money became player-assistant manager to Jimmy Bone at St Mirren before leaving the Paisley club to become a manager in his own right at Stranraer. In his time with Stranraer he led the Blues to the Scottish Challenge Cup in 1997 and the Scottish Football League Second Division title in 1998. After leaving Stranraer, in 1999, he joined his boyhood heroes, Ayr United, in a coaching capacity before replacing Gordon Dalziel as their manager in 2002. He left Somerset Park in 2004, briefly managing junior side Cumnock.

Money then joined Stenhousemuir as youth development director, where he gained a reputation of breeding young talent at the club. He replaced Des McKeown as manager in early November 2006. However, after a poor start to the 2007–08 season that culminated in a 7–0 thrashing from East Fife, he resigned.

Money then returned to managing Cumnock of the Scottish Junior Football West Premier League. He replaced Mark Shanks, who had replaced him at Ayr United. On 10 March 2009, with Cumnock being in second bottom position in the league, Money agreed to leave Cumnock and was replaced by Stevie Farrell.

Money was inducted to the St Mirren Hall of Fame in 2004. As of summer 2009, he took up the role of SFYI Development and Monitoring Co-ordinator at the SFA.

== See also ==
- List of goalscoring goalkeepers
- List of one-club men in association football
