= West of Scotland Football League =

Association football league in Scotland

- Founded: 2020
- Country: Scotland
- Confederation: UEFA
- Divisions: 5
- Number of clubs: 80
- Level on pyramid: 6–10
- Promotion to: Lowland Football League
- Domestic cup(s): Scottish Cup (SFA licensed clubs and Premier Division winners); South Region Challenge Cup; Scottish Junior Cup (SJFA members); Strathclyde Cup (Neither SFA nor SJFA members only)
- League cup: West of Scotland League Cup
- Current champions: Auchinleck Talbot (1st title) (2025–26)
- Most championships: Beith Juniors (2 titles)
- Website: www.wosfl.co.uk
- Current: 2026–27 West of Scotland Football League

The West of Scotland Football League (WoSFL) is a senior football league based in the west of Scotland. The league sits at levels 6–10 on the Scottish football league system, acting as a feeder to the Lowland Football League.

Founded in 2020, it is currently composed of 80 member clubs competing in five divisions. Geographically, the league covers Argyll & Bute, Ayrshire, East Dunbartonshire, West Dunbartonshire, Glasgow, Inverclyde, Lanarkshire, East Renfrewshire and Renfrewshire. Two clubs are also based in Dumfries and Galloway.

Since its formation, it has featured in the senior pyramid system. The winners take part in an end of season promotion play-off with the East of Scotland Football League and South of Scotland Football League champions, subject to clubs meeting the required licensing criteria.

== History ==
=== Formation ===
Talks to integrate all of the Scottish Junior Football Association clubs into the senior pyramid structure below the SPFL had been taking place for a number of years, however discussions at the Scottish Football Association's pyramid working group had broken down in early 2020. In February 2020 the Lowland and East of Scotland leagues invited clubs to express their interest in the formation of a new West of Scotland league at tier 6, with a majority of SJFA West Region clubs submitting emails. The next month, clubs were invited to information meetings and applications were opened to join the league.

On 14 April 2020, the Lowland League announced it had approved 67 applications for the new league, which included all 63 clubs from the Scottish Junior Football Association's West Region, (Note: SJFA West Region teams: Annbank United, Ardeer Thistle, Ardrossan Winton Rovers, Arthurlie, Ashfield, Auchinleck Talbot, Beith Juniors, Bellshill Athletic, Benburb, Blantyre Victoria, Cambuslang Rangers, Carluke Rovers, Clydebank, Craigmark Burntonians, Cumbernauld United, Cumnock Juniors, Dalry Thistle, Darvel, East Kilbride Thistle, Forth Wanderers, Gartcairn Juniors, Girvan, Glasgow Perthshire, Glenafton Athletic, Greenock Juniors, Hurlford United, Irvine Meadow XI, Irvine Victoria, Johnstone Burgh, Kello Rovers, Kilbirnie Ladeside, Kilsyth Rangers, Kilwinning Rangers, Kirkintilloch Rob Roy, Lanark United, Largs Thistle, Larkhall Thistle, Lesmahagow, Lugar Boswell Thistle, Maryhill, Maybole, Muirkirk, Neilston Juniors, Newmains United, Petershill, Pollok, Port Glasgow, Renfrew, Rossvale, Royal Albert, Rutherglen Glencairn, Saltcoats Victoria, Shettleston, Shotts Bon Accord, St Anthony's, St Roch's, Thorniewood United, Troon, Vale of Clyde, Vale of Leven, Whitletts Victoria, Wishaw, Yoker Athletic.) and four others: Glasgow amateurs Drumchapel United and Glasgow University, Kilmarnock side Bonnyton Thistle moving sideways from the South of Scotland League and Newton Mearns-based youth club St Cadoc's Youth Club from the Paisley, Johnstone & District League.

Initial plans for the inaugural season would have seen the league operate a conference format in order to facilitate all 67 clubs at the same level. However, following a video conference with the Scottish Football Association, the league was split into a top tier and lower divisions, similar to that utilised by the East of Scotland Football League.

On 1 May 2020, the League confirmed that a top division of 20 teams would contest the first season in 2020–21, comprising the 16 teams who had played in the 2019–20 West Region Premiership, the top three places from the West Championship and one moving 'sideways' from the South of Scotland Football League. This ran contrary to some clubs' expectations that the inaugural campaign would not use a hierarchical system, but the league stated "that option was not on the table" due to legal issues. Teams below the top division would be distributed into three balanced conferences; The list for which was published three days later.

=== Impact of Covid ===
On 17 September 2020, the League announced that the Premier Division would be split into two groups based on the Points Per Game formula that was used to declare the league winners of the SJFA West Region. There would be two phases to the season. In Phase 1, teams would play other teams within their group twice, home and away. Phase 2 consisted of a further ten games, five home and five away, with teams being drawn against teams from the other group. However, the league reverted to a normal home and away format following a number of withdrawals from the initial season.

On 11 January 2021 the league was suspended by the Scottish Football Association due to the escalating COVID-19 pandemic situation.

=== Expansion ===
On 12 May 2021, the league announced the formation of the Development League, with nine teams becoming initial members. The Development League became Division 4 when the WOSFL changed to a linear structure for the 2022–23 season. Teams in the Development League will only be promoted if they meet specified ground criteria.

Since formation, a number of clubs have successfully applied to join the league, or have taken over existing clubs, and currently the league runs at its maximum capacity of 80 clubs in 5 divisions. Examples include Harthill Royal joining in 2021–22 (though left the following season), and Threave Rovers joining in 2022–23. East Kilbride YM joined in 2025, while five new members were confirmed for the 2026–27 season, including the returning Annbank United.

== Member clubs ==
Location of teams in 2026–27 West of Scotland League
– Premier Division – First Division – Second Division – Third Division – Fourth Division

After running with a Premier Division of 20 clubs and three Tier 7 Conferences of 15 or 16 clubs during its transitional 2021–22 season, the WoSFL has since switched to a linear structure with the Premier, First, Second, Third, and Fourth Divisions now each containing 16 teams. Due to the expansion of the Lowland League, additional teams were promoted following the 2025-26 season, resulting in the fourth division having only 8 teams for 2026-27.

Listed below are the 72 clubs in the WoSFL for the 2026–27 season. Three clubs are promoted and relegated between each division.

=== Premier Division ===
- Arthurlie
- Ardrossan Winton Rovers
- Benburb
- Cumbernauld United
- Darvel
- Drumchapel United
- Glenafton Athletic
- Hurlford United
- Irvine Meadow XI
- Kilbirnie Ladeside
- Kirkintilloch Rob Roy
- St Roch's
- Rutherglen Glencairn
- Shotts Bon Accord
- St Cadoc's
- Vale of Clyde

=== First Division ===
- Bellshill Athletic
- Blantyre Victoria
- Bonnyton Thistle
- Cambuslang Rangers
- Gartcairn
- Kilsyth Rangers
- Lanark United
- Lesmahagow Juniors
- Maryhill
- Maybole Juniors
- Neilston
- Petershill
- Thorn Athletic
- Thorniewood United
- Threave Rovers
- Whitletts Victoria

=== Second Division ===
- Ardeer Thistle
- Ashfield
- Craigmark Burntonians
- Dalry Thistle
- Easterhouse
- Finnart
- Forth Wanderers
- Girvan
- Glasgow United
- Glasgow University
- Greenock Juniors
- Kilsyth Athletic
- Knightswood
- Larkhall Thistle
- Port Glasgow Juniors
- Yoker Athletic

=== Third Division ===
- Carluke Rovers
- East Kilbride Thistle
- East Kilbride Y.M.
- Eglinton
- Glasgow Perthshire
- Giffnock SC
- Glenvale
- Irvine Victoria
- Kello Rovers
- Lugar Boswell Thistle
- Newmains United
- Royal Albert
- Saltcoats Victoria
- St Anthony's
- Vale of Leven
- West Park United

=== Fourth Division ===
- Annbank United
- Campbeltown Pupils
- Castlemilk
- Eddlewood
- Gartcosh United
- St. Patrick's FP
- Rossvale
- Wishaw

== Seasons ==
Season	Premier Division	Tier 7 Conferences				
2020–21	Null and void					
	Premier Division	Tier 7 Conferences			Division Four	League Cup
2021–22	Darvel	A: Arthurlie; B: Cambuslang Rangers; C: Petershill			Finnart	Hurlford United
	Premier Division	First Division	Second Division	Third Division	Fourth Division	League Cup
2022–23	Beith Juniors	Gartcairn	Renfrew	Vale of Clyde	West Park United	Auchinleck Talbot
2023–24	Beith Juniors (2)	Drumchapel United	Ardrossan Winton Rovers	Lanark United	Glenvale	Darvel
2024–25	Clydebank *	Arthurlie	Neilston	Thorn Athletic	Knightswood	Auchinleck Talbot (2)
2025-26	Auchinleck Talbot	Irvine Meadow XI	Bellshill Athletic	Craigmark Burntonians	East Kilbride YM	Troon

* Team promoted to the Lowland League

== Cup competitions ==
- Scottish Cup (sponsored by Scottish Gas): For clubs with an SFA licence and the Premier Division winners, who all enter at the preliminary round stage. Knock-out tournament with no replays, except for in the preliminary rounds.
- SFA South Region Challenge Cup: (sponsored by FinestCarMats.co.uk) Introduced in 2007–08 as a replacement for the Scottish Qualifying Cup (South) which was abolished under the new Scottish Cup format. It is for all senior non-league clubs in the south of Scotland and has 163 entrants for the 2023–24 season – 16 from the Lowland League, 56 from the EoSFL, 11 from the SoSFL, and 80 from the WoSFL. Reserve teams do not take part. It is a straight knock-out tournament without replays, with drawn matches going to extra time.
- Strathclyde Cup (sponsored by Strathclyde Demolition): Competition for the WoSFL clubs who are neither SFA nor SJFA members, usually played on the same weekends as Junior Cup matches. Straight knock-out tournament, without replays. The winner goes on to play in the East, South and West of Scotland Cup-Winners Shield against the East's Alex Jack Cup winner and the Southern Counties FA's Alba Cup winners for a place in the following season's Scottish Cup.
- West of Scotland League Cup: All 80 WoSFL sides compete in this knock-out tournament without replays, drawn matches go straight to a penalty shootout. Similar to the West of Scotland Junior Cup, which was for all clubs in the former SJFA West Region.
- Scottish Junior Cup (sponsored by Clydebuilt Home Improvements): Competition for the 53 WoSFL clubs who remain members of the SJFA after moving from the Junior leagues. Knock-out tournament without replays, drawn matches go straight to a penalty shootout, two legged semi-finals.

=== Holders ===
2025-26 winners unless stated

- South Region Challenge Cup: Cumnock Juniors
- Scottish Junior Cup: Johnstone Burgh (2026 winner TBC)
- West of Scotland League Cup: Troon
- Strathclyde Cup: Whitlets Victoria
- Cup Winners Shield: Whitletts Victoria
