= Lanark United F.C. =

Association football club in Scotland

Lanark United
- Full name: Lanark United Football Club
- Nickname: The Yowes
- Founded: 1920
- Ground: Moor Park, Lanark
- Capacity: 1,500
- Coordinates: 55°40′9″N 3°45′30″W
- Manager: Steven McGurgan
- League: West of Scotland League First Division
- 2025–26: West of Scotland League First Division, 16th of 16
Home colours	Away colours

Lanark United Football Club are a Scottish football club based in the town of Lanark, South Lanarkshire. Nicknamed the Yowes, they were formed in 1920, and play at Moor Park. They currently compete in the West of Scotland League First Division and play in blue strips with a white trim.

== Honours ==
=== League ===
West of Scotland League Third Division

- Winners: 2023–24

Central League Division 1

- Winners: 1996–97, 2000–01

Central League Division 2

- Winners: 1984–85, 1995–96

West Region League Two

- Winners: 2018–19

=== Cup ===
- West of Scotland Cup Winners: 1976–77
- Central League C Division Winners: 1969–70
- Lanarkshire Junior Cup: 1926–27, 1934–35
- Lanarkshire Hozier Cup: 1923–24, 1924–25, 1925–26, 1959–60
- Central League Cup: 1975–76, 2006–07
- Central (Beatons Coaches) Sectional League Cup: 1975–76
- Evening Times Cup Winners: 2004–05
- Clydesdale Cup Winners: 2008–09, 2009–10 2024/25

== See also ==
- Category:Lanark United F.C. players
