= SJFA West Region Premiership =

Football league in Scotland

- Founded: 2002 (24 years ago)
- Folded: 2020
- Country: Scotland
- Number of clubs: 16
- Level on pyramid: 1
- Promotion to: no promotion
- Relegation to: West Region Championship
- Domestic cup: Scottish Junior Cup
- Last champions: Auchinleck Talbot (7th title) (2019–20)
- Most championships: Auchinleck Talbot (7 titles)
- Website: Scottish Junior FA

The SJFA West Region Premiership (also known as the McBookie.com West Region Premiership for sponsorship reasons) was a semi-professional football league run by the West Region of the Scottish Junior Football Association, and was the highest tier of league competition for its member clubs.

Formerly known as the West of Scotland Super League Premier Division, the league was created in 2002 with the amalgamation of the top leagues of the Central and Ayrshire regions.

It was abolished in 2020 when all SJFA West Region clubs moved to join the newly formed senior West of Scotland Football League.

The final champions and most successful club were Auchinleck Talbot, who won seven league titles. A total of 32 clubs competed in the league.

== History ==
Initially two clubs were automatically relegated to the Super League First Division at the end of each season, and replaced by the clubs placed first and second in that division. A relegation play-off was added in 2006–07 which saw the club finishing third bottom contest a two-legged play-off against the team which finished third in the Super League First Division.

From the 2007–08 season, the winners of the league were eligible to enter the senior Scottish Cup at its earliest stage, with Pollok being the first champions to take part in the Scottish Cup.

In 2017 West Region clubs voted to organise all leagues on a regionwide basis and as a result, the Super League Premier Division was rebranded as the West Region Premiership for the 2018–19 season. The league was also expanded to sixteen clubs, and with clubs were relegated to a rebranded Championship also consisting of sixteen teams.

The final season was curtailed due to the COVID-19 pandemic.

== Champions and season summaries ==
Note: Champions in bold completed the 'Double' by also winning the Junior Cup.

Year	Winner	Runners-up	Relegated	Promoted	West Region League play-off (aggregate)	Champions' Progression in Scottish Cup
2002–03	Pollok	Neilston Juniors	Benburb; Irvine Meadow XI	Arthurlie; Troon	N/A	N/A
2003–04	Kilwinning Rangers	Arthurlie	Kilbirnie Ladeside; Neilston Juniors	Bellshill Athletic; Renfrew	N/A	N/A
2004–05	Pollok (2)	Arthurlie	Kilwinning Rangers; Troon	Kilsyth Rangers; Shotts Bon Accord	N/A	N/A
2005–06	**Auchinleck Talbot**	Renfrew	Johnstone Burgh; Larkhall Thistle	Neilston Juniors; Petershill	N/A	N/A
2006–07	Pollok (3)	Auchinleck Talbot	Maryhill; Renfrew	Beith Juniors; Irvine Meadow XI	Glenafton Athletic 2 Kilwinning Rangers 0	2nd Round 2007–08
2007–08	Pollok (4)	Irvine Meadow XI	Kilsyth Rangers; Shotts Bon Accord	Kirkintilloch Rob Roy; Vale of Clyde	Cumnock Juniors 5 Kilwinning Rangers 2	1st Round 2008–09
2008–09	Irvine Meadow XI	Pollok	Neilston Juniors; Cumnock Juniors; Glenafton Athletic	Largs Thistle; Kilbirnie Ladeside; Lanark United	Lanark United 3 Glenafton Athletic 2	4th Round 2009–10
2009–10	Beith Juniors	Arthurlie	Vale of Clyde; Bellshill Athletic	Rutherglen Glencairn; Cumnock Juniors	Lanark United 3 Clydebank 2	3rd Round 2010–11
2010–11	Irvine Meadow (2)	Arthurlie	Rutherglen Glencairn; Lanark United	Ashfield; Clydebank	Petershill 1 Glenafton Athletic 0	3rd Round 2011–12
2011–12	Irvine Meadow (3)	Petershill	Kilbirnie Ladeside; Largs Thistle	Glenafton Athletic; Shotts Bon Accord	Pollok 5 Renfrew 1	2nd Round 2012–13
2012–13	**Auchinleck Talbot** (2)	Petershill	Shotts Bon Accord; Beith Juniors; Ashfield	Hurlford United; Kilbirnie Ladeside; Largs Thistle	Largs Thistle 7 Ashfield 7; 4–3 pens.	3rd Round 2013–14
2013–14	Auchinleck Talbot (3)	Irvine Meadow	Kirkintilloch Rob Roy; Pollok; Largs Thistle	Troon; Beith Juniors; Shotts Bon Accord	Shotts Bon Accord 5 Kirkintilloch Rob Roy 2	2nd Round 2014–15
2014–15	**Auchinleck Talbot** (4)	Hurlford United	Shotts Bon Accord; Cumnock Juniors; Clydebank	Pollok; Shettleston; Kirkintilloch Rob Roy	Kirkintilloch Rob Roy 4 Shotts Bon Accord 1	2nd Round 2015–16
2015–16	Auchinleck Talbot (5)	Hurlford United	Irvine Meadow; Petershill; Shettleston	Cumnock Juniors; Largs Thistle; Kilwinning Rangers	Kilwinning Rangers 5 Shettleston 3	Preliminary round 2 2016–17
2016–17	**Glenafton Athletic**	Kirkintilloch Rob Roy	Largs Thistle; Troon	Girvan; Clydebank	Kilwinning Rangers 3 Kilsyth Rangers 2	3rd Round 2017–18
2017–18	Beith Juniors (2)	Auchinleck Talbot	Girvan; Arthurlie	Petershill; Cambuslang; Largs; Renfrew; Irvine Meadow; Troon	Irvine Meadow 4 Arthurlie 1 Troon 4 Girvan 2	3rd Round 2018–19
2018–19	**Auchinleck Talbot** (6)	Hurlford United	Renfrew; Petershill; Cambuslang	Rutherglen Glencairn; Benburb; Rossvale		3rd Round 2019–20
2019–20 (Note: Season suspended in March 2020 due to the coronavirus pandemic. Champions calculated using 'points per game' algorithm, announced on 21 April.)	Auchinleck Talbot (7)	Kilwinning Rangers	No promotion or relegation: all clubs moved to the senior West of Scotland Football League.			Withdrew
