= Glenafton Athletic F.C. =

Association football club in East Ayrshire, Scotland

Glenafton Athletic
- Full name: Glenafton Athletic Football Club
- Nicknames: The Glens, The Afton
- Founded: 1930
- Ground: Loch Park, New Cumnock
- Capacity: 3,400
- Coordinates: 55°24′2″N 4°11′6″W
- Manager: Hugh Kerr
- League: West of Scotland League Premier Division
- 2025–26: West of Scotland League Premier Division, 13th of 16
- Website: http://glenaftonfc.com/
Home colours	Away colours

Glenafton Athletic Football Club is a Scottish football club, based in New Cumnock, Ayrshire. Members of the Scottish Junior Football Association, they play in the West of Scotland Football League. The club has won the Scottish Junior Cup twice, in 1993 and 2017.

== History ==
Glenafton Athletic were founded in 1930, as the coal mining industry which sustained the local area took an upturn after a period of severe depression. The colliery owned Connel Park ground had long been used by the village's former teams, including senior side Lanemark from 1877 until World War I, then by a previous Junior side, New Cumnock United, who burst brightly on to the scene in 1920 but failed to see out the decade. Glenafton got off to a flying start themselves, winning the South Ayrshire Junior League in their first season and retaining it the following year. By 1932, the South Ayrshire League had dwindled to six clubs, five of whom were admitted to the more North Ayrshire-centred, Western League in 1933. Glens' momentum saw them win a Western League and League Cup double in 1934–35, then lift the Ayrshire Cup in 1936. The club closed down for the duration of World War II.

On resuming, the club did not immediately reach their pre-war heights but towards the end of the 1950s things were improving and Glens' second Western League championship was won in 1958–59. Interest in the club was at an all-time high and a record crowd of 8,000 crammed into Connel Park to see Glens' Scottish Junior Cup fifth round tie against Kilsyth Rangers in January 1957. The confines of the old ground, surrounded by old miners rows one mile from the village, led the committee to seek an alternative ground and the 1959–60 season would be the last at Connel Park. The club's new Loch Park ground in the centre of New Cumnock was formally opened in August 1960 with a league game against Cumnock Juniors. The match was ceremonially kicked off by then Motherwell and Scotland star Ian St John, who had been a Junior player himself only three years previously. The club also ushered in this new era with a change in kit colour, from black and white hoops to white with red.

Glenafton won three Western League championships in a row from 1961–62 to 1963–64, a feat never achieved outwith wartime and drew closer to the biggest prize in the game with their first Scottish Junior Cup semi-final appearance in 1962, losing 1–0 to Kirkintilloch Rob Roy at Rugby Park. The club went one better the following season. After thrashing Cumnock 5–0 in the quarter-final at Loch Park, then seeing off Bonnyrigg Rose in a second semi-final replay, Glens' lined up against Irvine Meadow at Hampden Park in the first ever all-Ayrshire final. Despite going in front, then missing a penalty at 1–1, Athletic lost the game 2–1 in front of 21,384 spectators. The club entered a period of decline in the late 1960s and early 70s. A Scottish Junior Cup run to the semi-finals in 1978–79 was ended by Cumnock at Rugby Park, but paved the way for improved fortunes. Glens' enjoyed some local cup success and won the Ayrshire League title in 1982–83.

Former Partick Thistle and Scotland goalkeeper Alan Rough was appointed as manager in 1990 and proceeded to lead the club to their most successful period. A signing policy of reinstating ex-senior footballers including a clutch from Thistle such as Dave MacFarlane, Alex O'Hara, Jamie Doyle and Alex Kennedy, saw the club reach a record five Junior Cup semi-finals in a row. The club went on to the final in three of those years from 1992 to 1994 and finally lifted the trophy for the first time in 1993 with a 1–0 victory over Tayport at Firhill Stadium. Striker Tom Brown stepped up to Kilmarnock the following season and won the Senior Scottish Cup in 1997, while winning goalscorer John Millar later won the Junior Cup as a player with Arthurlie in 1998 and as a manager with Beith Juniors in 2016 Glens' added the Ayrshire League and Cup that season to complete a memorable treble. Rough moved on in 1995 and Glens' next trophy would be the Jackie Scarlett Cup in 1999–2000, but their win over Kilwinning Rangers denied The Buffs a clean sweep of Junior trophies that season.

The Junior Superleague era dawned and Glens' were the last Ayrshire League champions before reconstruction in 2001–02 under manager John McStay. With Tommy Bryce installed in charge the following season, Glens' finished a creditable third in the first combined Super League Premier Division and also won the West of Scotland Cup for the first time in their history. The West Cup was won again in 2005–06 but the club were relegated after a play-off with Lanark United in 2008–09. Having lost a promotion play-off the previous season, Glens' won the Super League First Division title in 2012–13 under Darren Henderson. Henderson left for Hurlford United on the eve of the 2013–14 season leaving Tommy Bryce, who returned to the club for a second spell, to rebuild the squad. Bryce's remodelled side secured a top six finish and made it all the way to the Scottish Junior Cup final for a fifth time where they ironically lost out to Henderson's Hurlford team.

Former Raith Rovers and Ayr United player Craig McEwan took charge of the team in January 2015. A player in Glens' losing 2014 Junior Cup final side, McEwan led the club to their first Super League Premier Division championship in 2016–17, before completing the double by defeating local rivals Auchinleck Talbot to win the Scottish Junior Cup for a second time in June 2017.

In 2020, Glens' moved from the SJFA, to join the pyramid system in Scottish football as one of the inaugural members of the West of Scotland Football League.

On 11 October 2020, McEwan resigned as manager. The club had released a statement earlier announcing they would not be participating in the inaugural season of the West of Scotland League due to concerns relating to the COVID-19 pandemic.

== Scottish Junior Cup finals record ==
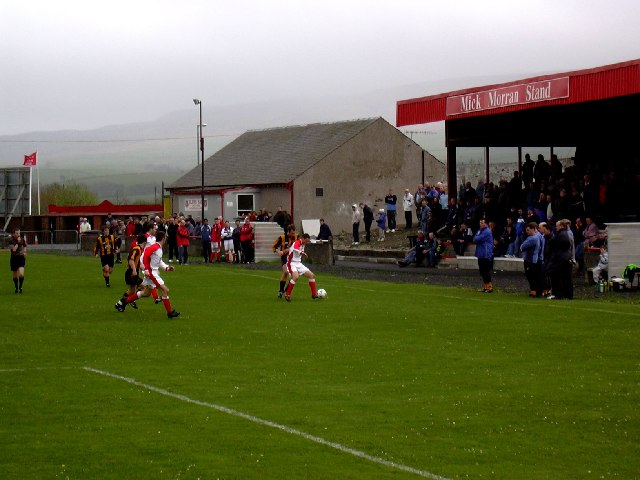
The club's home ground

Glenafton have a poor record in Scottish Junior Cup finals with two victories from their six appearances to date. The club appeared in the first all Ayrshire final in 1963 and each subsequent loss has also been to an Ayrshire opponent. Glenafton finally ended this run in 2017 with victory over near neighbours Auchinleck Talbot.

Season	Opponent	Result
1962–63	Irvine Meadow	1–2
1991–92	Auchinleck Talbot	0–4
1992–93	Tayport	1–0
1993–94	Largs Thistle	0–1
2013–14	Hurlford United	0–3
2016–17	Auchinleck Talbot	2–1

== Current squad ==
As of 15 July 2026

Note: Flags indicate national team as defined under FIFA eligibility rules; some limited exceptions apply. Players may hold more than one non-FIFA nationality.

No.	Pos.	Nation	Player
—	GK	SCO	David Markey
—	GK	SCO	Ally Semple
—	GK	ENG	Harry Sutton
—	GK	SCO	Marc Fisher
—	GK	SCO	Sam Gibson
—	DF	SCO	Andy Strachan
—	DF	SCO	Matthew Hoffin
—	DF	SCO	Lyall Holding
—	DF	SCO	Craig Pettigrew
—	DF	SCO	Kieran MacDonald
—	DF	SCO	Ollie Rowe
—	MF	SCO	Hugh Kerr
—	MF	SCO	Scott McLean
—	MF	SCO	Kyle Hutton
—	MF	SCO	Liam Caddis

No.	Pos.	Nation	Player
—	MF	SCO	Andy Stirling
—	MF	SCO	Andy McLaughlin
—	MF	SCO	Callum McFadyen
—	MF	SCO	Craig Truesdale
—	MF	SCO	Dylan O'Kane
—	MF	SCO	Harvey Gilmour
—	MF	SCO	Ross Smith
—	MF	SCO	Ryan Walker
—	MF	SCO	Alex Waters
—	FW	SCO	Sam McKee
—	FW	SCO	Cameron McKenzie
—	FW	SCO	Michael Moffat
—	FW	SCO	Ryan Nisbet
—	FW	SCO	Michael Mullen

== Management team ==
As of 29 June 2026

Position	Name
Manager	Hugh Kerr
Assistant manager	Kyle Hutton and Jordan Allan
First Team Coaches	Bill Reside and Terry Thompson
Goalkeeping coach	Scott Gilmour
Physio	Laura Pagan

== Honours ==
Scottish Junior Cup

- Winners: 1992–93, 2016–17
- Runners-up: 1962–63, 1991–92, 1993–94, 2013–14

=== Other Honours ===
- West of Scotland Super League Premier Division winners: 2016–17
- West of Scotland Cup winners: 2002–03, 2005–06, 2012–13
- Ayrshire First Division winners: 1934–35, 1958–59, 1961–62, 1962–63, 1963–64, 1982–83, 1992–93, 2001–02
- West of Scotland Super League First Division winners: 2011–12
- Ayrshire Cup: 1935–36, 1961–62, 1988–89, 1992–93, 2000–01
- Ayrshire League Cup: 1934–35, 1958–59, 1962–63, 1965–66, 1979–80, 1999–00
- Ayrshire District Cup: 1930–31, 1969–60, 1979–80, 1985–86, 1993–94, 1997–98
- East Ayrshire Cup: 1997–98
- Ayrshire Super Cup: 1997–98
- Ayrshire Sectional League Cup: 2005–06, 2014–15
