= Kilwinning Rangers F.C. =

Association football club in North Ayrshire, Scotland

Kilwinning Rangers
- Full name: Kilwinning Rangers Football Club
- Nickname: The Buffs
- Founded: 1899
- Ground: Buffs Park, Kilwinning
- Capacity: 2,800
- Coordinates: 55.6480°N 4.7069°W
- Chairman: Jack Schofield
- Manager: Chris Strain
- League: Lowland League West
- 2025–26: West of Scotland League Premier Division, 7th of 16 (promoted)
- Website: https://kilwinningrangers.com/
Home colours	Away colours

Kilwinning Rangers Football Club are a Scottish football club based in the town of Kilwinning, Ayrshire. Formed in 1899, the club competes in the Lowland Football League, and are eligible to participate in the Scottish Cup. Nicknamed The Buffs, they play in blue and white hoops. Home matches are played at Buffs Park, within Kilwinning Sports Club, where the club moved prior to the 2019–20 season having spent 90 years at Abbey Park.

== History ==
=== 19th century ===
Kilwinning Rangers were originally formed as a Juvenile football club in 1899, sharing Blacklands Park with the local senior club - the now defunct Kilwinning Eglinton (the current Eglinton F.C. are unrelated).

=== 20th century ===
In 1902, the club joined the Junior grade; however, it was three years before the club won their first honour, emerging as winners of the Ayrshire Junior Challenge Cup in 1904–05.

They became the first Ayrshire club to win the Scottish Junior Cup in 1908–09 with a 1–0 victory over Strathclyde. A second appearance in the final followed in 1909–10, however Kilwinning were defeated 3–0 by Ashfield. Ninety years later, Kilwinning regained the Scottish Junior Cup with a 1–0 victory over Kelty Hearts, in a season which saw them win six out of the seven trophies available to them.

=== 21st century ===
Kilwinning became the first Ayrshire side to win the West Super League in 2003–04 however financial issues resulted in the team finishing bottom of the league the following season and subsequently relegated. Most of the following decade was spent in the Ayrshire District League with a promotion to the Super First Division achieved in 2012–13. The following season almost resulted in Kilwinning avoiding relegation, however the club had fielded an ineligible player for twelve matches and the resulting nineteen point deduction relegated the side to the bottom division.

A change in management occurred in February 2014, with the appointment of Chris Strain and Colin Stewart; although Stewart left to take up a coaching role at Rangers in 2015 and Strain assumed the role of sole manager.

Kilwinning achieved successive promotions in 2014-15 and 2016–17, courtesy of a play-off victory against Shettleston and maintained their top flight status the following season by defeating Kilsyth Rangers in another play-off.

In 2020, Kilwinning applied to join the newly formed West of Scotland Football League, which would see them leave the Junior leagues after joining 118 years prior The following year, Kilwinning began their application to join the Scottish Football Association. This application was successful in June 2022, allowing the Buffs to participate in the Scottish Cup for the first time in the history in the 2022–23 season.

In early April 2022, Chris Strain was sacked. Former player and ex-professional, Mark Campbell was appointed caretaker manager until the end of the season. Broomhill manager David Gormley was hired for the start of the next season. In January 2023 Gormley was relieved of his position as manager and former Clyde, Ayr United, Morton and Stirling Albion player Chris Aitken was appointed as manager in early February. Following Aitken's resignation, Ex-Caledonian Locomotives boss Kevin Kelly was appointed along with his assistant Steven Saunders.

In March 2026, the club parted ways with Kevin Kelly and his coaching team by mutual consent and reappointed Chris Strain as manager, along with Kevin McDonald as assistant manager, Paul McDougall as first team coach and promoted Dylan Mackin from under-20s manager to first team coach.

The Buffs held their AGM in early May 2026 when Jack Schofield was unanimously appointed as club chairman, with Alan McAlpine continuing in a vice chair role.

The Buffs finished the season in 7th position and in doing so were promoted to the Lowland League West.

=== Scottish Cup ===
Kilwinning Rangers made their first ever foray into the Scottish Cup in the 2022–23 season; defeating Rutherglen Glencairn and Tranent, before succumbing to Scottish League Two side Forfar Athletic in the second round proper.

== Nickname ==
Several theories exists as to the origin of the nickname "Buffs". Historic maps of Kilwinning show the site of the present day Abbey Park to have been within an area known as "The Butts," an adaption of which may have led to the eponym.

Another theory is that one of the players around that time was a member of the East Kent Regiment of the British Army, who were nicknamed The Buffs.

The early Kilwinning Rangers were known to have played in a dull yellow or "buff" strip. However the origin of the nickname remains unknown.

In January 2025, to coincide with the opening of the new club museum, the origin of the nickname was revealed, officially endorsed by the club. A trip to the Buffs Museum will provide the answer.

== Ground ==
Several grounds were used by the club in the early years of its existence. Initially Kilwinning moved to a ground named Woodwynd Park which was located on Woodwynd itself, between Hamilton Street and Kilrig Avenue. Several years later the club began playing at Claremont Park, near to the now demolished Kilwinning East railway station. The Buffs moved to Abbey Park (near Kilwinning Abbey) in 1929 and remained there until 2019.

At the start of the 2019–20 season they relocated to the Kilwinning Sports Club ground in Pennyburn on the outskirts of the town which was upgraded and renamed Buffs Park.

In April 2020, the club agreed to buy the former Old Trafford floodlights from non-league York City to upgrade Buffs Park to SPFL standards, however, the plan fell through.

A seated stand was added ahead of the 2020-21 West of Scotland Football League season; with the new floodlights following the next year.

Due to safety concerns, the uncovered seated stand was removed and will shortly be replaced by a brand new 234 seated stand thanks to funding from the SFA and a seat for life debenture scheme.

== Current squad ==
As of 10 August 2026

=== First team ===
Note: Flags indicate national team as defined under FIFA eligibility rules; some limited exceptions apply. Players may hold more than one non-FIFA nationality.

No.	Pos.	Nation	Player
1	GK	SCO	Dylan Brown (on loan from Kilmarnock)
2	MF	SCO	Murray Mackintosh
3	DF	SCO	Andy Rodden
4	DF	SCO	Danny O'Neil
5	DF	SCO	Ross Love
6	MF	SCO	Ben Lewis
7	MF	SCO	Carlo Monti
8	MF	SCO	Paul Frize
9	FW	SCO	Bryan Boylan (captain)
10	MF	SCO	Robbie Scullion
11	FW	SCO	Ryan Wilson

No.	Pos.	Nation	Player
12	MF	SCO	Nick Lockhart
14	MF	SCO	Daniel Gray (on loan from Partick Thistle)
15	MF	SCO	Mikey McWilliams
16	DF	SCO	Ewan McLevy
17	DF	SCO	Matt McLean
18	DF	SCO	Adam Hodge
19	DF	SCO	Harry Lockwood
20	FW	SCO	Lewis Morrison
22	GK	SCO	Ben Coutts
23	GK	SCO	Ross Shaw
TBC	FW	SCO	Ciaran Diver

=== On loan ===
Note: Flags indicate national team as defined under FIFA eligibility rules; some limited exceptions apply. Players may hold more than one non-FIFA nationality.

No.	Pos.	Nation	Player
—	DF	SCO	Mikey Moynihan (on loan at Thorn Athletic)

== Management team ==
As of 26 October 2026

Position	Name
Chairman	Jack Schofield
Vice Chairman	Alan McAlpine
Manager	Chris Strain
Assistant Manager	Kevin McDonald
First Team Coaches	Paul McDougall & Dylan Mackin
Goalkeeping Coaches	Ross Stewart & James Catterson
First Team Physio	Stephen Gray
Club Secretary	Craig McDonald
Club Vice-Secretary	Alan Redman
Development Team Manager	Gavin Friels
Development Coach	Cammy Elliott
Club Child Wellbeing & Protection Officer	Alan McAlpine
Kit Managers	Brian Love & Jayne Gorman
Disability Liaison Officer	Jim Tudhope
Media Manager	Kai Gilmour

== Honours ==
=== Senior ===
West of Scotland Football League Cup

- Runners-up: 2021–22

West of Scotland Football League Premier Division

- Promotion: 2025–26

West of Scotland Football League First Division

- Promotion: 2024–25

=== Junior ===
Scottish Junior Cup

- Winners (2): 1908–09, 1998–99
- Runners-up (2): 1909–10, 1921–22

West of Scotland Super League Premier Division

- Winners: 2003–04
- Runners-up: 2019–20

=== Other honours ===
Leagues

- Western Junior League
  - Winners (4): 1920–21, 1922–23, 1931–32, 1965–66
  - Runners-up (2): 1933–34, 1934–35
- Western Intermediate League
  - Winners (2): 1927–28, 1930–31
- Ayrshire Junior Football League
  - Winners (2): 1998–99, 1999–00
  - Runners-up: 1991–92
- Ayrshire Second Division
  - Winners (3): 1980–81, 1988–89, 1990–91
- Ayrshire District League
  - Winners: 2012–13
  - Runners-up (2): 2009–10, 2014–15
- Irvine & District League
  - Winners (3): 1907–08, 1908–09, 1913–14

Cups

- West of Scotland Cup
  - Winners (2): 1993–94, 1998–99
  - Runners-up: 2014–15
- Ayrshire Cup
  - Winners (11): 1904–05, 1908–09, 1934–35, 1976–77, 1985–86, 1994–95, 1997–98, 1998–99, 1999–00, 2001–02, 2017–18
- Ayrshire League Cup
  - Winners (2): 1929–30, 1998–99
- Ayrshire District Cup
  - Winners (8): 1905–06, 1920–21, 1931–32, 1958–59, 1995–96, 1998–99, 2000–01, 2001–02
- North Ayrshire Cup
  - Winners (4): 1995–96, 1997–98, 1999–00, 2000–01
- Western Intermediate League Cup
  - Winners: 1929–30
- Eglinton Cup
  - Winners (2): 2021, 2022
- Pat Rall Memorial Tournament
  - Winners: 2025

=== Youth honours ===
- U16 Scottish Cup
  - Winners: 2025–26
  - Runners-up: 2023–24
- Lady Darling Supplementary Cup
  - Winners: 2005–06
- U18 West of Scotland Cup
  - Winners: 2024–25
- Wallace Gemmell Shield
  - Winners: 2024–25

== Senior history ==
As of 21 November 2026

Season	Division	Tier	Final league position	Top Goalscorer	Total Goals (all comps)
2026-27	Lowland League West	V	3rd - after 14 games	Ryan Wilson	22
2025-26	WoSFL Premier Division	VI	7th (promoted)	Ryan Wilson	28
2024-25	WoSFL First Division	VII	4th (promoted)	Jack McMahon	16
2023-24	WoSFL First Division	VII	7th	Graham Boyd	15
2022-23	WoSFL Premier Division	VI	15th (relegated)	Dylan Mackin	22
2021-22	WoSFL Premier Division	VI	5th	Thomas Collins	18

== Notable players ==
1. Players that have played/managed in the Scottish Championship or any foreign equivalent or higher than this level (i.e. fully professional league).
2. Players with full international caps.
3. Players that hold a club record or have captained the club.

- Derek Anderson
- Bobby Beattie (1 cap, 0 goals)
- Dominic Boland
- Jamie Barclay
- Mark Campbell
- Martyn Campbell
- Bill Culley
- Duncan Currie
- Garry Fleming
- Dylan Kerr
- Dylan Mackin
- Neil McGregor
- David McKellar
- Marc McKenzie
- Colin Meldrum
- Mark Millar
- Chris Millar
- Peter Millar (13 caps, 9 goals)
- Carlo Monti
- Lewis Morrison
- Steven Old (17 caps, 1 goal; played at the 2008 Summer Olympics)
- Craig Pettigrew
- Ross Smith
- Ross Stewart (4 caps, 0 goals; played at 2026 FIFA World Cup)
- Stephen Swift
- David Syme (club record transfer sale)
- Hugh Wales (1 cap, 0 goals)
- Michael Wardrope
- David Wilson (managed Gibraltar national football team)
- David Winters
