= 2001–02 Dumbarton F.C. season =

Dumbarton
2001-02 season
- Manager: Tom Carson
- Stadium: Strathclyde Homes Stadium, Dumbarton
- Scottish League Division 3: 2nd
- Scottish Cup: First Round
- Scottish League Cup: Second Round
- Bell's Challenge Cup: Second Round
- Top goalscorer: League: Paddy Flannery (18); All: Paddy Flannery (19)
- Highest home attendance: 1,959
- Lowest home attendance: 533
- Average home league attendance: 838

Season 2001–02 was the 118th football season in which Dumbarton competed at a Scottish national level, entering the Scottish Football League for the 96th time, the Scottish Cup for the 107th time, the Scottish League Cup for the 55th time and the Scottish Challenge Cup for the 11th time.

== Overview ==
Season 2001-02 began with a sense of confidence - this would be the first full season at the new home ground and followed the appointment of Tom Carson as manager which brought about a change of fortunes to Dumbarton's campaign the previous season. The league season itself would be full of ups and downs but in the end it came down to the final game against one of their oldest opponents, Queen's Park. A draw would be sufficient to gain a promotion place, but at 1-1 in stoppage time, Queen's Park were awarded a soft penalty. Fortunes were on Dumbarton's side however, as John Wight made a magnificent save and promotion was secured.

In Scottish Cup, Dumbarton lost out to Alloa Athletic in the first round.

In the League Cup, an excellent win over near neighbours Clydebank was followed by a second round exit to Premier Division Dundee United.

Finally, in the Scottish Challenge Cup, Dumbarton returned to old habits and lost in their first outing against Ross County.

Locally, in the Stirlingshire Cup, Dumbarton won both of their group ties, and progressed to their first final in six years, but failed in a penalty shoot out against Stenhousemuir.

== Results & fixtures ==
Win Draw Loss

=== Scottish Third Division ===
6 August 2001 Third Division	Dumbarton	1–2	Brechin City	Strathclyde Homes Stadium
	Flannery		Bain; King	Attendance: 837

11 August 2001 Third Division	Peterhead	0–3	Dumbarton	Balmoor Stadium
			McKeown; Flannery; Robertson	Attendance: 528

18 August 2001 Third Division	Dumbarton	2–1	Queen's Park	Strathclyde Homes Stadium
	Brown; Robertson		Marshall	Attendance: 717

25 August 2001 Third Division	Dumbarton	0–1	Montrose	Strathclyde Homes Stadium
			Brand	Attendance: 781

8 September 2001 Third Division	East Stirling	2–4	Dumbarton	Firs Park
	Menelaws		Flannery; O'Neill; Robertson; Bonar	Attendance: 208

18 September 2001 Third Division	Dumbarton	1–1	Albion Rovers	Strathclyde Homes Stadium
	Flannery		Booth	Attendance: 581

19 September 2001 Third Division	Stirling Albion	4–5	Dumbarton	Forthbank Stadium
	Henderson; Williams		Robertson; Flannery; Crilly	Attendance: 446

22 September 2001 Third Division	Dumbarton	2–2	Elgin City	Strathclyde Homes Stadium
	Crilly; Lynes		Hynd; Kelly	Attendance: 764

29 September 2001 Third Division	East Fife	4-1	Dumbarton	Bayview Stadium
	McManus; Allen		Crilly	Attendance: 392

13 October 2001 Third Division	Brechin City	3-2	Dumbarton	Glebe Park, Brechin
	Fotheringham; Grant; Clark		Brown; Flannery	Attendance: 429

20 October 2001 Third Division	Dumbarton	0–3	Peterhead	Strathclyde Homes Stadium
			Mackay; Stewart; Johnston	Attendance: 715

27 October 2001 Third Division	Dumbarton	2–2	East Stirling	Strathclyde Homes Stadium
	Flannery		Lyle; Lorimer	Attendance: 591

3 November 2001 Third Division	Montrose	1-3	Dumbarton	Links Park
	Sharp		Flannery; Stewart; Crilly	Attendance: 503

10 November 2001 Third Division	Albion Rovers	0-2	Dumbarton	Cliftonhill Stadium
			Crilly; Brown	Attendance: 420

24 November 2001 Third Division	Dumbarton	4–1	Stirling Albion	Strathclyde Homes Stadium
	O'Neill; Flannery; Crilly; Brittain		Williams	Attendance: 860

8 December 2001 Third Division	Elgin City	0-3	Dumbarton	Borough Briggs
			Brittain; Robertson; Brown	Attendance: 511

15 December 2001 Third Division	Dumbarton	1–0	East Fife	Strathclyde Homes Stadium
	Flannery			Attendance: 521

12 January 2002 Third Division	Dumbarton	0–5	Montrose	Strathclyde Homes Stadium
			Ferguson; Kerrigan; Laidlaw	Attendance: 745

19 January 2002 Third Division	Stirling Albion	2-1	Dumbarton	Forthbank Stadium
	Williams; Brannigan		Flannery	Attendance: 555

26 January 2002 Third Division	Dumbarton	2–0	Albion Rovers	Strathclyde Homes Stadium
	Robertson			Attendance: 686

2 February 2002 Third Division	East Fife	1-0	Dumbarton	Bayview Stadium
	Mortimer			Attendance: 419

9 February 2002 Third Division	Dumbarton	3–1	Elgin City	Strathclyde Homes Stadium
	Flannery; Lauchlan; Crilly		Gilzean	Attendance: 690

16 February 2002 Third Division	Peterhead	4-0	Dumbarton	Balmoor Stadium
	Stewart; Tindal; Robertson			Attendance: 589

23 February 2002 Third Division	Queen's Park	0-0	Dumbarton	Hampden Park
				Attendance: 725

27 February 2002 Third Division	Dumbarton	2–1	Brechin City	Strathclyde Homes Stadium
	Brown; Crilly		Fotheringham	Attendance: 533

2 March 2002 Third Division	Montrose	1-1	Dumbarton	Links Park
	Christie		McCann	Attendance: 485

9 March 2002 Third Division	Dumbarton	2–1	East Stirling	Strathclyde Homes Stadium
	Crilly; McCann		Lorimer	Attendance: 715

16 March 2002 Third Division	Albion Rovers	1-1	Dumbarton	Links Park
	Harty		Flannery	Attendance: 503

19 March 2002 Third Division	Queen's Park	0-2	Dumbarton	Hampden Park
			Dunn	Attendance: 411

23 March 2002 Third Division	Dumbarton	2–0	Stirling Albion	Strathclyde Homes Stadium
	Flannery; Dunn			Attendance: 792

30 March 2002 Third Division	Elgin City	2-0	Dumbarton	Borough Briggs
	McBride; Gilzean			Attendance: 709

2 April 2002 Third Division	East Stirling	1-0	Dumbarton	Firs Park
	Ure			Attendance: 317

6 April 2002 Third Division	Dumbarton	2–0	East Fife	Strathclyde Homes Stadium
	Flannery; Crilly			Attendance: 694

13 April 2002 Third Division	Brechin City	0-1	Dumbarton	Glebe Park, Brechin
			Brown	Attendance: 702

20 April 2002 Third Division	Dumbarton	3–0	Peterhead	Strathclyde Homes Stadium
	Dunn; Brown; Dillon			Attendance: 1,636

27 April 2002 Third Division	Dumbarton	1–1	Peterhead	Strathclyde Homes Stadium
	Flannery		Whelan	Attendance: 1,959

=== Bell's Challenge Cup ===
14 August 2001 Challenge Cup round 2	Dumbarton	0–2	Ross County	Strathclyde Homes Stadium
			McQuade; Hislop	Attendance: 370; Referee: K Toner

=== CIS League Cup ===
11 September 2001 League Cup round 1	Dumbarton	2–0	Clydebank	Strathclyde Homes Stadium
	Brown; Flannery			Attendance: 695; Referee: I Fyfe

25 September 2001 League Cup round 2	Dundee United	3–0	Dumbarton	Tannadice Park
	Thompson; Easton; Griffin			Attendance: 3,702; Referee: C MacKay

=== Tennent's Scottish Cup ===
17 November 2001 Cup round 1	Alloa Athletic	3–1	Dumbarton	Recreation Park, Alloa
	Little; Evans; Hutchison		McKeown	Attendance: 539; Referee: C Richmond

=== Stirlingshire Cup ===
14 July 2001 Group stage	Alloa Athletic	1–2	Dumbarton	Recreation Park, Alloa
	Goal		Brittain; Brown

28 July 2001 Group stage	Stirling Albion	0–2	Dumbarton	Forthbank Stadium
			Brittain; Brown

4 September 2001 Final	Dumbarton	0–0 (Stenhousemuir on penalties)	Stenhousemuir	Strathclyde Homes Stadium

=== Friendlies ===
29 July 2001 Friendly	Rhu Amateurs	2–6	Dumbarton	Somerset Park
	Goal		Martin; Wotherspoon trialists

31 July 2001 Friendly	Ayr United	2–1	Dumbarton	Somerset Park
	Goal		Crilly

== League table ==
Pos	Team	Pld	W	D	L	GF	GA	GD	Pts	Promotion
1	Brechin City (C, P)	36	22	7	7	67	38	+29	73	Promotion to the Second Division
2	Dumbarton (P)	36	18	7	11	59	48	+11	61	Promotion to the Second Division
3	Albion Rovers	36	16	11	9	51	32	+19	59	
4	Peterhead	36	17	5	14	63	52	+11	56	
5	Montrose	36	16	7	13	43	39	+4	55	
6	Elgin City	36	13	8	15	45	47	−2	47	
7	East Stirlingshire	36	12	4	20	51	58	−7	40	
8	East Fife	36	11	7	18	39	56	−17	40	
9	Stirling Albion	36	9	10	17	45	68	−23	37	
10	Queen's Park	36	9	8	19	38	53	−15	35	

Source: "2001-2002 Third Division - SPFL Archive". SPFL.
Rules for classification: 1) points; 2) goal difference; 3) number of goals scored.
(C) Champions; (P) Promoted

== Player statistics ==
=== Squad ===
No.	Pos	Nat	Player	Total		Third Division		League Cup		Challenge Cup		Scottish Cup	
No.	Pos	Nat	Player	Apps	Goals	Apps	Goals	Apps	Goals	Apps	Goals	Apps	Goals
	GK	(Scotland) SCO	Jon Connolly	2	0	2+0	0	0+0	0	0+0	0	0+0	0
	GK	(Scotland) SCO	John Hillcoat	14	0	12+0	0	2+0	0	0+0	0	0+0	0
	GK	(Scotland) SCO	John Wight	24	0	22+0	0	0+0	0	1+0	0	1+0	0
	DF	(Scotland) SCO	Craig Brittain	36	2	27+5	2	0+2	0	1+0	0	1+0	0
	DF	(Scotland) SCO	Jamie Bruce	11	0	10+0	0	0+0	0	0+0	0	1+0	0
	DF	(Scotland) SCO	Michael Dickie	25	0	23+0	0	0+0	0	1+0	0	1+0	0
	DF	(Scotland) SCO	Kevin McCann	23	2	19+0	2	2+0	0	1+0	0	0+1	0
	DF	(Scotland) SCO	John McKeown	26	2	23+0	1	2+0	0	0+0	0	1+0	1
	DF	(Scotland) SCO	Martin Melvin	1	0	0+0	0	0+0	0	0+1	0	0+0	0
	DF	(Scotland) SCO	Martin O'Neill	33	2	27+3	2	1+0	0	0+1	0	1+0	0
	DF	(Scotland) SCO	Dave Stewart	21	1	17+0	1	2+0	0	0+1	0	1+0	0
	MF	(Scotland) SCO	Steven Bonar	36	1	19+13	1	2+0	0	1+0	0	1+0	0
	MF	(Scotland) SCO	Mark Crilly	33	10	29+1	10	2+0	0	0+0	0	1+0	0
	MF	(Scotland) SCO	John Dillon	37	1	15+18	1	2+0	0	1+0	0	0+1	0
	MF	(Scotland) SCO	Robert Dunn	13	4	11+2	4	0+0	0	0+0	0	0+0	0
	MF	(Scotland) SCO	Stephen Jack	30	0	25+3	0	1+0	0	1+0	0	0+0	0
	MF	(Scotland) SCO	Martin Lauchlan	11	1	9+2	1	0+0	0	0+0	0	0+0	0
	MF	(Scotland) SCO	Craig Lynes	23	1	5+15	1	0+2	0	1+0	0	0+0	0
	MF	(Scotland) SCO	Scott Murdoch	5	0	5+0	0	0+0	0	0+0	0	0+0	0
	FW	(Scotland) SCO	Andy Brown	38	8	35+0	7	2+0	1	1+0	0	0+0	0
	FW	(Scotland) SCO	Paddy Flannery	35	19	32+1	18	2+0	1	0+0	0	0+0	0
	FW	(Scotland) SCO	Danny McKelvie	26	0	2+20	0	0+2	0	1+0	0	1+0	0
	FW	(Scotland) SCO	Joe Robertson	38	8	28+6	8	2+0	0	1+0	0	1+0	0

=== Transfers ===
==== Players in ====
Player	From	Date
(Scotland) John McKeown	(Scotland) Ayr United	8 Jun 2001
(Scotland) Scott Murdoch	(Scotland) Clydebank	9 Jun 2001
(Scotland) Danny McKelvie	(Scotland) Clydebank	5 Jul 2001
(Scotland) Mark Crilly	(Scotland) Ayr United	6 Sep 2001
(Scotland) Martin Lauchlan	(Scotland) St Johnstone (loan)	14 Dec 2001
(Scotland) Robert Dunn	(Scotland) Airdrie	1 Mar 2002
(Scotland) Jon Connolly	(Scotland) Motherwell	2 Mar 2002

==== Players out ====
Player	To	Date
(Scotland) Scott Murdoch	(Scotland) Albion Rovers	12 Jan 2002
(Scotland) John Hillcoat	(Scotland) St Mirren	26 Feb 2002
(Scotland) Steve McCormick	(Scotland) Albion Rovers	
(Scotland) Brian McGinty	(Scotland) Cumnock	
(Scotland) Chris Smith	(Scotland) Maryhill	
(Scotland) Alan Brown	(Scotland) Vale of Leven	
(Scotland) Jamie Bruce	(Scotland) Johnstone Burgh	
(Scotland) John Ritchie	(Scotland) Vale of Leven	
(Scotland) Martin Melvin		

== Trivia ==
- The League match against Elgin City on 9 February marked Andy Brown's 100th appearance for Dumbarton in all national competitions - the 122nd Dumbarton player to reach this milestone.

== See also ==
- 2001–02 in Scottish football
