= 2002–03 Dumbarton F.C. season =

Dumbarton
2002-03 season
- Manager: David Winnie/ Brian Fairlie
- Stadium: Strathclyde Homes Stadium, Dumbarton
- Scottish League Division 2: 6th
- Scottish Cup: First Round
- Scottish League Cup: First Round
- Bell's Challenge Cup: Third Round
- Top goalscorer: League: Paddy Flannery/ Gary McCutcheon (8); All: John Dillon (9)
- Highest home attendance: 1,501
- Lowest home attendance: 480
- Average home league attendance: 950

Season 2002–03 was the 119th football season in which Dumbarton competed at a Scottish national level, entering the Scottish Football League for the 97th time, the Scottish Cup for the 108th time, the Scottish League Cup for the 56th time and the Scottish Challenge Cup for the 12th time.

== Overview ==
Season 2002-03 began with yet another new manager at the helm. Following the success of promotion the season before, Tom Carson had fallen out with the board and left the club, to be replaced by David Winnie. The league campaign, as was so often the case with Dumbarton, started well and then fell away. By March there were some concerns of a return to Division 3, resulting in David Winnie's departure as manager. Fortunately his replacement Brian Fairlie had the desired effect and a final unbeaten 7 game run ensured a creditable 6th place.

In the Scottish Cup, for the second year running, it would be a first round exit, this time to Raith Rovers.

In the League Cup, Inverness Caledonian Thistle were to prove too much to handle in the first round.

Finally, in the Scottish Challenge Cup, it was a case of 'role reversal'. In the competition which had seen just one win in ten attempts, this season would see a mini cup run before Queen of the South would bring it to an end in the third round.

Locally, in the Stirlingshire Cup, Dumbarton played just one group tie, losing to Falkirk on penalties after a drawn game.

== Results & fixtures ==
Win Draw Loss

=== Scottish Second Division ===
3 August 2002 Scottish Second Division	Stenhousemuir	2–2	Dumbarton	Ochilview
	Booth 10', 67' (pen.)	BBC Report	Bonar 79'; Flannery 90'	Attendance: 419; Referee: I Brines

10 August 2002 Scottish Second Division	Dumbarton	1–0	Brechin City	Dumbarton Football Stadium
	Collins 19'	BBC Report		Attendance: 735; Referee: J Gilmour

17 August 2002 Scottish Second Division	Raith Rovers	1–0	Dumbarton	Starks Park
	Hawley 90'	BBC Report		Attendance: 1,866; Referee: S Conroy

24 August 2002 Scottish Second Division	Dumbarton	3–1	Airdrie United	Dumbarton Football Stadium
	Brown; Dillon; Ronald 19' (o.g.)	BBC Report	Armstrong 68'	Attendance: 1,417; Referee: E Mack

31 August 2002 Scottish Second Division	Berwick Rangers	1–2	Dumbarton	Shielfield Park
	Burke 46'	BBC Report	McCutcheon 1', 15'	Attendance: 509; Referee: E Martindale

14 September 2002 Scottish Second Division	Dumbarton	1–2	Forfar Athletic	Dumbarton Football Stadium
	McCutcheon 27'	BBC Report	Bavidge; Byers 90'	Attendance: 827; Referee: I Fyfe

21 September 2002 Scottish Second Division	Stranraer	1–0	Dumbarton	Stair Park
	Kerr 43'	BBC Report		Attendance: 563; Referee: D Smith

28 September 2002 Scottish Second Division	Dumbarton	1–1	Hamilton	Dumbarton Football Stadium
	Brown 28'	BBC Report	Dobbins 20'	Attendance: 1,202; Referee: I Frickleton

5 October 2002 Scottish Second Division	Cowdenbeath	3–1	Dumbarton	Central Park, Cowdenbeath
	Brown 27'; Winter 74'; Gordon	BBC Report	McCutcheon 42'	Attendance: 363; Referee: C Richmond

26 October 2002 Scottish Second Division	Dumbarton	0–0	Stenhousemuir	Dumbarton Football Stadium
		BBC Report		Attendance: 819; Referee: A Hunter

29 October 2002 Scottish Second Division	Brechin City	1–1	Dumbarton	Glebe Park, Brechin
	Templeman 54'	BBC Report	Brown 29'	Attendance: 250; Referee: C Murray

2 November 2002 Scottish Second Division	Dumbarton	1–2	Berwick Rangers	Dumbarton Football Stadium
	Lynes 43'	BBC Report	Burke 44'; Wood 90'	Attendance: 768; Referee: J Gilmour

9 November 2002 Scottish Second Division	Airdrie United	0–1	Dumbarton	Excelsior Stadium
		BBC Report	Flannery 70' (pen.)	Attendance: 1,352; Referee: G Clyde

16 November 2002 Scottish Second Division	Forfar Athletic	2–0	Dumbarton	Station Park, Forfar
	Bavidge 53', 72'	BBC Report		Attendance: 556; Referee: W Young

23 November 2002 Scottish Second Division	Dumbarton	3–0	Stranraer	Dumbarton Football Stadium
	Flannery (pen.); McCutcheon; Bonar	BBC Report		Attendance: 740; Referee: B Cassidy

30 November 2002 Scottish Second Division	Dumbarton	1–1	Cowdenbeath	Dumbarton Football Stadium
	McCutcheon 36'	BBC Report	Brown	Attendance: 784; Referee: B McGarry

14 December 2002 Scottish Second Division	Hamilton	1–0	Dumbarton	New Douglas Park
	Russell 2'	BBC Report		Attendance: 1,062; Referee: J Downie

28 December 2002 Scottish Second Division	Dumbarton	0–3	Raith Rovers	Dumbarton Football Stadium
		BBC Report	Hawley 44'; Smith 81', 89'	Attendance: 1,244; Referee: C Melville

1 January 2003 Scottish Second Division	Dumbarton	2–1	Airdrie United	Dumbarton Football Stadium
	Obidile 18'; Dillon 43'	BBC Report	Vareille 90'	Attendance: 1,024; Referee: C Richmond

11 January 2003 Scottish Second Division	Berwick Rangers	0–1	Dumbarton	Shielfield Park
		BBC Report	Dillon 72'	Attendance: 580; Referee: C Allan

18 January 2003 Scottish Second Division	Dumbarton	1–2	Forfar Athletic	Dumbarton Football Stadium
	Dillon 8'	BBC Report	Rattray 30'; Byers 90'	Attendance: 867; Referee: C Thomson

25 January 2003 Scottish Second Division	Stenhousemuir	2–1	Dumbarton	Ochilview
	Booth 1'; McFarlane 67'	BBC Report	Dillon 53' (pen.)	Attendance: 483; Referee: S Conroy

1 February 2003 Scottish Second Division	Stranraer	1–2	Dumbarton	Stair Park
	Moore 16'	BBC Report	McCutcheon 5'; Scally 60'	Attendance: 405; Referee: I Fyfe

8 February 2003 Scottish Second Division	Dumbarton	3–1	Hamilton	Dumbarton Football Stadium
	Scally 50'; Collins 60'; McCutcheon 88'	BBC Report	Armstrong 41'	Attendance: 1,107; Referee: A Hunter

1 March 2003 Scottish Second Division	Raith Rovers	2–1	Dumbarton	Starks Park
	Dennis 15'; Prest	BBC Report	Scally 70'	Attendance: 1,780; Referee: C Hardie

8 March 2003 Scottish Second Division	Airdrie United	2–1	Dumbarton	Excelsior Stadium
	Gow 2'; Collins 16' (o.g.)	BBC Report	Flannery 80'	Attendance: 1,136; Referee: B McGarry

11 March 2003 Scottish Second Division	Dumbarton	1–3	Brechin City	Dumbarton Football Stadium
	Flannery 25' (pen.)	BBC Report	Templeman 44', 60', 78'	Attendance: 480; Referee: E Martindale

15 March 2003 Scottish Second Division	Dumbarton	2–2	Berwick Rangers	Dumbarton Football Stadium
	Brown 20'; Bonar 70'	BBC Report	Bradley 71'; McEwan 90' (o.g.)	Attendance: 915; Referee: G Clyde

18 March 2003 Scottish Second Division	Cowdenbeath	2–0	Dumbarton	Central Park, Cowdenbeath
	Mauchlan 18' (pen.); Elliott 79'	BBC Report		Attendance: 218; Referee: B Cassidy

1 April 2003 Scottish Second Division	Dumbarton	1–1	Stranraer	Dumbarton Football Stadium
	Donald 64'	BBC Report	Wingate 18'	Attendance: 596; Referee: J Downie

5 April 2003 Scottish Second Division	Forfar Athletic	0–1	Dumbarton	Station Park, Forfar
		BBC Report	Scally 44'	Attendance: 450; Referee: E Martindale

1 April 2003 Scottish Second Division	Dumbarton	3–1	Cowdenbeath	Dumbarton Football Stadium
	Flannery (pen.); Dillon 44'; Obidile 88'	BBC Report	Gordon 87' (pen.)	Attendance: 1,203; Referee: C Hardie

19 April 2003 Scottish Second Division	Hamilton	2–2	Dumbarton	New Douglas Park
	Dobbins 41'; Callaghan 68'	BBC Report	Flannery 60'; Brown	Attendance: 1,270; Referee: G Mitchell

26 April 2003 Scottish Second Division	Dumbarton	3–1	Stenhousemuir	Dumbarton Football Stadium
	Flannery 9'; Russell 35'; Scally 89'	BBC Report	Crawford 16'	Attendance: 906; Referee: C Richmond

3 May 2003 Scottish Second Division	Brechin City	1–1	Dumbarton	Glebe Park, Brechin
	King 32'	BBC Report	Obidile 40'	Attendance: 895; Referee: C Thomson

10 May 2003 Scottish Second Division	Dumbarton	4–1	Raith Rovers	Dumbarton Football Stadium
	Obidile 27'; Russell 30', 51'; Dillon 33'	BBC Report	Blackadder 16' (pen.)	Attendance: 1,501; Referee: S Dougal

=== Bell's Challenge Cup ===
6 August 2002 Challenge Cup round 1	Dumbarton	1–0	East Fife	Dumbarton Football Stadium
	Duffy 10'	BBC report		Attendance: 452; Referee: C Melville

13 August 2002 Challenge Cup round 2	Dumbarton	3–0	Ayr United	Dumbarton Football Stadium
	Brown 37'; Dillon 50', 83'	BBC report		Attendance: 938; Referee: B Cassidy

20 August 2002 Challenge Cup round 3	Queen of the South	2–0	Dumbarton	Palmerston Park
	O'Neill 25'; Lyle 90'	BBC report		Attendance: 1,128; Referee: J Underhill

=== CIS League Cup ===
10 September 2002 League Cup round 1	Inverness Caledonian Thistle	2–0	Dumbarton	Caledonian Stadium
	Wyness 24'; Ritchie 71'	BBC Report		Attendance: 667; Referee: G Mitchell

=== Tennent's Scottish Cup ===
7 December 2002 Cup round 1	Raith Rovers	1–0	Dumbarton	Starks Park
	Blackadder 72'	BBC Report		Attendance: 1,639; Referee: C Murray

=== Stirlingshire Cup ===
16 July 2002 Group stage	Dumbarton	1–1 (3-4 p)	Falkirk	Dumbarton Football Stadium
	Brown, T		Lawrie 32'	Attendance: 563

=== Pre-season and Other Matches ===
6 July 2002 Friendly	Dumbarton Academicals	0–1	Dumbarton	Dumbarton
			Crilly

10 July 2002 Friendly	Queen's Park	1–2	Dumbarton	Hampden Park
	Goal		Bonar (o.g.)

20 July 2002 Friendly	Dunfermline Athletic	2–1	Dumbarton	East End Park, Dunfermline
	Goal		Robertson (o.g.)

27 July 2002 Friendly	Dumbarton	3–2	(England) Wycombe Wanderers	Dumbarton Football Stadium
	Duffy 40'; Lynes 58'; Flannery 59'		Roberts 41'; Cook 72'	Attendance: 442; Referee: H Dallas

18 October 2002 Friendly	Neilston	0–3	Dumbarton	Neilston
			Scally; Lynes; Crilly

24 October 2002 Friendly	Arthurlie	1–2	Dumbarton	Arthurlie
	Goal		Flannery; Dillon

21 December 2002 Friendly	St Mirren	3–4	Dumbarton	Love Street (stadium)
	Goal		McCutcheon; Scally; Dillon; McKelvie

5 March 2003 Friendly	St Mirren	1–2	Dumbarton	Love Street (stadium)
	Goal		Flannery; Lynes

15 April 2003 Friendly	Albion Rovers	0–3	Dumbarton	Cliftonhill Stadium
			McCutcheon; Obidile trialist

== League table ==
Pos	Team	Pld	W	D	L	GF	GA	GD	Pts
4	Forfar Athletic	36	14	9	13	55	53	+2	51
5	Berwick Rangers	36	13	10	13	43	48	−5	49
6	Dumbarton	36	13	9	14	48	47	+1	48
7	Stenhousemuir	36	12	11	13	49	51	−2	47
8	Hamilton Academical	36	12	11	13	43	48	−5	47

Rules for classification: 1) points; 2) goal difference; 3) number of goals scored.

== Player statistics ==
=== Squad ===
No.	Pos	Nat	Player	Total		Second Division		League Cup		Challenge Cup		Scottish Cup	
No.	Pos	Nat	Player	Apps	Goals	Apps	Goals	Apps	Goals	Apps	Goals	Apps	Goals
	GK	(Scotland) SCO	Stephen Grindlay	38	0	33+0	0	1+0	0	3+0	0	1+0	0
	GK	(Scotland) SCO	John Wight	4	0	3+1	0	0+0	0	0+0	0	0+0	0
	DF	(Scotland) SCO	Craig Brittain	28	0	26+0	0	1+0	0	0+0	0	1+0	0
	DF	(Scotland) SCO	Neil Collins	38	3	33+0	3	1+0	0	3+0	0	1+0	0
	DF	(Scotland) SCO	Michael Dickie	27	0	20+3	0	1+0	0	1+1	0	1+0	0
	DF	(Scotland) SCO	Neil Duffy	27	1	23+0	0	0+0	0	3+0	1	1+0	0
	DF	(Scotland) SCO	Kevin McCann	7	0	2+3	0	0+1	0	1+0	0	0+0	0
	DF	(Scotland) SCO	Craig McEwan	28	0	21+2	0	1+0	0	2+1	0	1+0	0
	DF	(Scotland) SCO	John McKeown	16	0	12+4	0	0+0	0	0+0	0	0+0	0
	DF	(Scotland) SCO	Dave Stewart	25	0	16+4	0	1+0	0	3+0	0	0+1	0
	MF	(Scotland) SCO	Steven Bonar	39	3	26+9	3	0+0	0	3+0	0	0+1	0
	MF	(Scotland) SCO	Mark Crilly	17	0	12+2	0	1+0	0	2+0	0	0+0	0
	MF	(Scotland) SCO	John Dillon	40	9	34+1	7	1+0	0	3+0	2	1+0	0
	MF	(Scotland) SCO	Barry Donald	7	1	3+4	1	0+0	0	0+0	0	0+0	0
	MF	(Scotland) SCO	Craig Lynes	18	1	4+10	1	0+1	0	0+2	0	1+0	0
	MF	(Nigeria) NGA	Emeka Obidile	14	3	9+5	3	0+0	0	0+0	0	0+0	0
	FW	(Scotland) SCO	Andy Brown	33	4	19+10	4	1+0	0	3+0	0	0+0	0
	FW	(Scotland) SCO	Tom Brown	30	2	23+4	1	0+0	0	3+0	1	0+0	0
	FW	(Scotland) SCO	Paddy Flannery	31	8	18+9	8	0+0	0	3+0	0	1+0	0
	FW	(Scotland) SCO	Gary McCutcheon	32	8	23+8	8	1+0	0	0+0	0	0+0	0
	FW	(Scotland) SCO	Danny McKelvie	8	0	1+3	0	0+1	0	0+3	0	0+0	0
	FW	(Scotland) SCO	Joe Robertson	15	0	4+9	0	0+0	0	0+1	0	1+0	0
	FW	(Scotland) SCO	Iain Russell	11	4	8+3	4	0+0	0	0+0	0	0+0	0
	FW	(Scotland) SCO	Neil Scally	29	5	23+4	5	1+0	0	0+0	0	1+0	0

=== Transfers ===
==== Players in ====
Player	From	Date
(Scotland) Tom Brown	(Scotland) Alloa Athletic	16 Jul 2002
(Scotland) Neil Duffy	(Scotland) Ayr United	16 Jul 2002
(Scotland) Neil Collins	(Scotland) Queen's Park	27 Jul 2002
(Scotland) Stephen Grindlay	(England) Newcastle United	2 Aug 2002
(Scotland) Craig McEwan	(Scotland) Ayr United	2 Aug 2002
(Scotland) Gary McCutcheon	(Scotland) Kilmarnock	23 Aug 2002
(Scotland) Neil Scally	(Scotland) Ayr United	30 Aug 2002
(Scotland) Barry Donald	(Scotland) Queen of the South	13 Jan 2003
(Nigeria) Emeka Obidile	(Scotland) Cowdenbeath	24 Jan 2003
(Scotland) Iain Russell	(Scotland) Motherwell	31 Jan 2003

==== Players out ====
Player	To	Date
(Scotland) Robert Dunn	(Scotland) Stirling Albion	30 Aug 2002
(Scotland) Mark Crilly	(Scotland) Stirling Albion	28 Jan 2003
(Scotland) Martin O'Neill	(Scotland) Auchinleck Talbot	
(Scotland) Jon Connelly	(Scotland) Cumnock	
(Scotland) Stephen Jack	(Scotland) Pollok	
(Scotland) Danny McKelvie	(Scotland) Johnstone Burgh	
(Scotland) Joe Robertson		

== Trivia ==
- The League match against Raith Rovers on 17 August marked John Dillon's 100th appearance for Dumbarton in all national competitions - the 123rd Dumbarton player to reach this milestone.
- The League Cup match against Inverness Caledonian Thistle on 10 September marked Michael Dickie's and Dave Stewart's 100th appearances for Dumbarton in all national competitions - the 124th and 125th Dumbarton players respectively to reach this milestone.
- The League match against Raith Rovers on 1 March marked Steven Bonar's 100th appearance for Dumbarton in all national competitions - the 126th Dumbarton player to reach this milestone.

== See also ==
- 2002–03 in Scottish football
