= 2013–14 West of Scotland Super League Premier Division =

Stagecoach West of Scotland Super League Premier Division
- Season: 2013–14
- Champions: Auchinleck Talbot
- Relegated: Kirkintilloch Rob Roy; Pollok; Largs Thistle
- Matches: 132
- Goals: 429 (3.25 per match)
- Biggest home win: Auchinleck Talbot 6–0 Arthurlie; 30 Aug 2013
- Biggest away win: Kirkintilloch Rob Roy 1–5 Hurlford United; 12 Oct 2013; Petershill 1–5 Kilbirnie Ladeside; 14 Dec 2013
- Highest scoring: Pollok 5–4 Kilbirnie Ladeside; 22 Mar 2014
- Longest winning run: (6) Hurlford United; 28 Apr 2013 – 14 May 2014; Irvine Meadow; 12 Oct 2013 – 21 Dec 2013
- Longest unbeaten run: (16) Auchinleck Talbot; 17 Aug 2013 – 15 Mar 2014
- Longest winless run: (10) Largs Thistle; 17 Aug 2013 – 16 Nov 2013
- Longest losing run: (7) Largs Thistle; 7 Sep 2013 – 16 Nov 2013

The 2013–14 West of Scotland Super League Premier Division was the twelfth Super League Premier Division competition since the formation of the Scottish Junior Football Association, West Region in 2002. The season began on 17 August 2013. The winners of this competition are eligible to enter round one of the 2014–15 Scottish Cup. The two last placed sides were relegated to the Super League First Division. The third-bottom placed side entered the West Region league play-off, a two-legged tie against the third placed side in the Super League First Division, to decide the final promotion/relegation spot.

Auchinleck Talbot won their second successive title on 10 May 2014.

== Member clubs for the 2013–14 season ==
Auchinleck Talbot were the reigning champions.

Hurlford United and Kilbirnie Ladeside were promoted from the Super League First Division, replacing the automatically relegated Beith Juniors and Shotts Bon Accord.

Largs Thistle claimed a third promotion spot after defeating Ashfield in the West Region League play-off.

Club	Location	Ground	Manager	Finishing position 2012–13
Arthurlie	Barrhead	Dunterlie Park	Gavin Duncan	6th
Auchinleck Talbot	Auchinleck	Beechwood Park	Tommy Sloan	Champions
Clydebank	Clydebank	Holm Park	Billy McGhie	3rd
Cumnock Juniors	Cumnock	Townhead Park	Brian McLuckie	8th
Glenafton Athletic	New Cumnock	Loch Park	Tommy Bryce	4th
Hurlford United	Hurlford	Blair Park	Darren Henderson	Super League First Division, 1st
Irvine Meadow	Irvine	Meadow Park	Stevie Rankin	5th
Kilbirnie Ladeside	Kilbirnie	Valefield Park	Mark Crilly & Stephen Swift	Super League First Division, 2nd
Kirkintilloch Rob Roy	Kirkintilloch	Adamslie Park	Stewart Maxwell	7th
Largs Thistle	Largs	Barrfields Stadium	Sandy MacLean	Super League First Division, 3rd
Petershill	Springburn, Glasgow	Petershill Park	Willie Paterson	2nd
Pollok	Newlands, Glasgow	Newlandsfield Park	Tony McInally	9th

=== Managerial changes ===
Club	Outgoing manager	Manner of departure	Date of vacancy	Position in table	Incoming manager	Date of appointment
Hurlford United	Derek McCulloch	Resigned	19 June 2013	Close season	Darren Henderson	27 June 2013
Glenafton Athletic	Darren Henderson	Appointed manager at Hurlford United	27 June 2013	Close season	Tommy Bryce	13 July 2013
Pollok	John Richardson	Resigned	23 September 2013	5th	Stephen Docherty	4 October 2013
Pollok	Stephen Docherty	Resigned	2 December 2013	9th	Tony McInally	26 December 2013
Petershill	Scott Smith	Resigned as co-manager	End of season	8th	N/A	

== League table ==
Pos	Team	Pld	W	D	L	GF	GA	GD	Pts	Qualification or relegation
1	Auchinleck Talbot (C)	22	16	3	3	48	20	+28	51	Qualification for 2014–15 Scottish Cup
2	Irvine Meadow	22	14	4	4	38	23	+15	46	
3	Hurlford United	22	13	6	3	50	26	+24	45	
4	Clydebank	22	10	3	9	34	29	+5	33	
5	Cumnock Juniors	22	8	6	8	32	31	+1	30	
6	Glenafton Athletic	22	9	2	11	27	33	−6	29	
7	Kilbirnie Ladeside	22	8	4	10	40	32	+8	28	
8	Petershill	22	6	7	9	34	37	−3	25	
9	Arthurlie	22	6	6	10	27	41	−14	24	
10	Kirkintilloch Rob Roy (R)	22	7	2	13	33	51	−18	23	Qualification for West Region League play-off
11	Pollok (R)	22	5	4	13	39	58	−19	19	Relegation to Super League First Division
12	Largs Thistle (R)	22	6	1	15	27	48	−21	19	Relegation to Super League First Division

Updated to match(es) played on 9 June 2014. Source: SJFA West Region
Rules for classification: 1) points; 2) goal difference; 3) number of goals scored.
(C) Champions; (R) Relegated

== Results ==
Home \ Away	ART	AUC	CLY	CMN	GLE	HUR	IVM	KLB	KRR	LRG	PSH	PLK
Arthurlie		1–1	2–5	2–0	1–3	1–2	0–4	1–1	4–1	1–2	2–2	1–1
Auchinleck Talbot	6–0		2–0	2–1	2–1	1–1	1–2	3–0	4–0	3–0	3–1	2–0
Clydebank	3–1	3–0		1–2	1–3	0–1	1–1	2–1	2–0	3–2	0–2	1–2
Cumnock Juniors	0–3	0–1	1–1		1–2	4–4	2–0	1–4	3–0	5–1	1–3	1–1
Glenafton Athletic	1–0	0–1	1–2	0–1		0–2	1–3	3–2	2–1	2–1	0–0	3–2
Hurlford United	0–0	5–3	1–0	2–2	2–0		0–1	3–2	4–1	4–0	1–1	5–1
Irvine Meadow	1–1	0–1	1–0	0–0	2–0	2–3		1–0	2–4	1–0	3–1	3–2
Kilbirnie Ladeside	3–0	0–1	0–0	1–1	2–1	3–0	1–2		1–1	1–2	3–0	2–0
Kirkintilloch Rob Roy	1–2	2–4	0–1	2–1	1–0	1–5	1–3	3–0		4–1	1–4	4–2
Largs Thistle	1–2	1–2	1–3	1–2	3–0	1–0	1–1	1–4	2–3		2–1	2–1
Petershill	1–2	1–1	2–1	0–1	1–2	0–0	2–3	1–5	1–1	2–0		3–3
Pollok	2–0	1–4	3–4	0–2	2–2	2–5	1–2	5–4	3–1	3–2	2–5	

Updated to match(es) played on 9 June 2014. Source: SJFA West Region
Legend: Blue = home team win; Yellow = draw; Red = away team win.

=== West Region League play-off ===
Shotts Bon Accord, who finished third in the Super League First Division, defeated Kirkintilloch Rob Roy 5 – 2 on aggregate in the West Region League play-off. Shotts will replace Rob Roy in the 2014–15 West of Scotland Super League Premier Division.

3 June 2014
19:15

Kirkintilloch Rob Roy	1 – 1	Shotts Bon Accord
Ryan Deas 78'	Report	44' Gary McStay

Adamslie Park, Kirkintilloch
Referee: David Munro
5 June 2014
19:15

Shotts Bon Accord	4 – 1	Kirkintilloch Rob Roy
Jack Marriott 28'; Chris Walker 40', 64'; Steven Canning 72'	Report	46' Chris Duff

Greenfield Park, Shettleston
Referee: David Lowe
