= 2014–15 West of Scotland Super League Premier Division =

Stagecoach West of Scotland Super League Premier Division
- Season: 2014–15
- Champions: Auchinleck Talbot
- Relegated: Cumnock Juniors; Clydebank; Shotts Bon Accord
- Matches: 132
- Goals: 434 (3.29 per match)

The 2014–15 West of Scotland Super League Premier Division was the thirteenth Super League Premier Division competition since the formation of the Scottish Junior Football Association, West Region in 2002. The season began on 30 August 2014. The winners of this competition were eligible to enter round one of the 2015–16 Scottish Cup. The two last placed sides are relegated to the Super League First Division. The third-bottom placed side will enter the West Region league play-off, a two-legged tie against the third placed side in the Super League First Division, to decide the final promotion/relegation spot.

Auchinleck Talbot won their third successive title on 23 May 2015.

== Member clubs for the 2014–15 season ==
Auchinleck Talbot were the reigning champions.

Troon and Beith Juniors were promoted from the Super League First Division, replacing the automatically relegated Pollok and Largs Thistle.

Shotts Bon Accord claimed a third promotion spot after defeating Kirkintilloch Rob Roy in the West Region League play-off.

Club	Location	Ground	Manager	Finishing position 2013–14
Arthurlie	Barrhead	Dunterlie Park	Robert Downs	9th
Auchinleck Talbot	Auchinleck	Beechwood Park	Tommy Sloan	Champions
Beith Juniors	Beith	Bellsdale Park	John Millar	Super League First Division, 2nd
Clydebank	Clydebank	Holm Park	Billy McGhie	4th
Cumnock Juniors	Cumnock	Townhead Park	John McKeown	5th
Glenafton Athletic	New Cumnock	Loch Park	Craig McEwan	6th
Hurlford United	Hurlford	Blair Park	Darren Henderson	3rd
Irvine Meadow	Irvine	Meadow Park	Stevie Rankin	2nd
Kilbirnie Ladeside	Kilbirnie	Valefield Park	Stephen Swift	7th
Petershill	Springburn, Glasgow	Petershill Park	Willie Paterson	8th
Shotts Bon Accord	Shotts	Hannah Park	Tam McDonald	Super League First Division, 3rd
Troon	Troon	Portland Park	Jim Kirkwood	Super League First Division, 1st

=== Managerial changes ===
Club	Outgoing manager	Manner of departure	Date of vacancy	Position in table	Incoming manager	Date of appointment
Arthurlie	Gavin Duncan	Resigned	24 September 2014	9th	Craig McEwan	5 October 2014
Cumnock Juniors	Brian McLuckie	Resigned	4 October 2014	11th	John McKeown	14 October 2014
Glenafton Athletic	Tommy Bryce	Resigned	4 January 2015	7th	Craig McEwan	19 January 2015
Arthurlie	Craig McEwan	Resigned	18 January 2015	8th	Robert Downs	31 January 2015
Kilbirnie Ladeside	Mark Crilly	Resigned as co-manager	24 February 2015	10th	N/A	

== League table ==
Pos	Team	Pld	W	D	L	GF	GA	GD	Pts	Qualification or relegation
1	Auchinleck Talbot (C)	22	18	2	2	53	12	+41	56	Qualification for 2015–16 Scottish Cup
2	Hurlford United	22	16	4	2	54	22	+32	52	
3	Irvine Meadow	22	12	4	6	44	25	+19	40	
4	Glenafton Athletic	22	9	5	8	47	37	+10	32	
5	Petershill	22	10	2	10	33	38	−5	32	
6	Beith Juniors	22	8	5	9	35	45	−10	29	
7	Troon	22	7	7	8	35	38	−3	28	
8	Kilbirnie Ladeside	22	7	4	11	38	41	−3	25	
9	Arthurlie	22	7	4	11	28	41	−13	25	
10	Shotts Bon Accord (R)	22	8	1	13	24	45	−21	25	Qualification for West Region League play-off
11	Cumnock Juniors (R)	22	3	7	12	28	45	−17	16	Relegation to Super League First Division
12	Clydebank (R)	22	2	5	15	17	45	−28	11	Relegation to Super League First Division

Updated to match(es) played on 30 May 2015. Source: SJFA West Region
Rules for classification: 1) points; 2) goal difference; 3) number of goals scored.
(C) Champions; (R) Relegated

== Results ==
Home \ Away	ART	AUC	BEI	CLY	CMN	GLE	HUR	IVM	KLB	PSH	SBA	TRO
Arthurlie		1–0	0–0	2–1	2–1	0–2	1–5	0–2	3–4	4–3	0–2	3–1
Auchinleck Talbot	1–1		8–2	2–1	5–0	3–0	2–1	0–2	2–0	3–1	3–0	4–1
Beith Juniors	4–2	0–2		2–1	4–4	1–0	1–4	2–4	0–0	3–4	4–2	4–4
Clydebank	1–1	0–4	0–2		2–2	1–2	1–2	0–1	0–2	2–0	0–2	0–3
Cumnock Juniors	1–2	0–1	0–1	0–0		0–2	2–3	2–3	0–0	1–2	4–1	1–1
Glenafton Athletic	2–2	0–2	2–2	4–1	2–3		1–3	2–2	5–0	1–2	6–0	4–2
Hurlford United	4–0	0–1	2–0	2–2	1–1	3–1		1–0	3–1	5–0	2–1	2–1
Irvine Meadow	1–0	0–3	1–0	1–2	3–1	1–1	1–2		1–3	1–0	6–0	5–0
Kilbirnie Ladeside	3–1	0–0	0–1	6–0	5–1	2–3	2–3	3–5		0–1	2–2	0–4
Petershill	0–2	1–2	2–0	2–1	4–2	4–3	1–1	1–1	3–1		0–1	1–2
Shotts Bon Accord	2–1	0–2	1–2	2–0	1–2	0–1	1–4	1–0	1–3	0–1		3–2
Troon	1–0	1–3	2–0	1–1	0–0	3–3	1–1	1–1	2–1	2–0	0–1	

Updated to match(es) played on 30 May 2015. Source: SJFA West Region
Legend: Blue = home team win; Yellow = draw; Red = away team win.

=== West Region League play-off ===
Kirkintilloch Rob Roy, who finished third in the Super League First Division, defeated Shotts Bon Accord 4 – 1 on aggregate in the West Region League play-off. Rob Roy will replace Shotts in the 2015–16 West of Scotland Super League Premier Division.

2 June 2015
19:30

Shotts Bon Accord	0 – 2	Kirkintilloch Rob Roy
	Evening Times	Willie Sawyers; Jordan McGuire

Hannah Park, Shotts
Referee: Derek Crothers
4 June 2015
19:30

Kirkintilloch Rob Roy	2 – 1	Shotts Bon Accord
Lee Davison; Kevin Watt	Evening Times	Liam Mushet

Guys Meadow, Cumbernauld
Referee: Chris Graham
