= 2011–12 West of Scotland Super League Premier Division =

Stagecoach West of Scotland Super League Premier Division
- Season: 2011–12
- Champions: Irvine Meadow XI
- Relegated: Kilbirnie Ladeside; Largs Thistle
- Matches: 132
- Goals: 459 (3.48 per match)
- Biggest home win: Auchinleck Talbot 9–1 Ashfield; 5 November 2011
- Biggest away win: Cumnock Juniors 0–6 Irvine Meadow; 7 January 2012
- Highest scoring: Kilbirnie Ladeside 8–2 Cumnock Juniors; 24 September 2011; Auchinleck Talbot 9–1 Ashfield; 5 November 2011
- Longest winning run: Clydebank (8); 21 January 2012 – season end
- Longest unbeaten run: Auchinleck Talbot (9); 14 January 2012 – 9 May 2012
- Longest losing run: Kilbirnie Ladeside (8); 14 January 2012 – 25 April 2012

The 2011–12 West of Scotland Super League Premier Division was the tenth Super League Premier Division competition since the formation of the Scottish Junior Football Association, West Region in 2002. The season began on 13 August 2011. The winners of this competition gain direct entry to round one of the 2012–13 Scottish Cup. The two last placed sides were relegated to the Super League First Division. The third-bottom placed side entered the West Region league play-off, a two-legged tie against the third placed side in the Super League First Division, to decide the final promotion/relegation spot.

Irvine Meadow won the championship on 19 May 2012, their third title in four seasons.

Kilbirnie Ladeside and Largs Thistle were relegated. Pollok defeated Renfrew in the West Region league play-off to retain their place in the division.

== Member clubs for the 2011–12 season ==
Irvine Meadow are the reigning champions. Ashfield and Clydebank were promoted from the Super League First Division, replacing Lanark United and Rutherglen Glencairn. Petershill retained their place in the league after defeating Glenafton Athletic in the West Region League play-off.

Club	Location	Ground	Manager	Finishing position 2010–11
Arthurlie	Barrhead	Dunterlie Park	Mark Cameron	2nd
Ashfield	Possilpark, Glasgow	Saracen Park	Stevie Rankin	Super League First Division, 1st
Auchinleck Talbot	Auchinleck	Beechwood Park	Tommy Sloan	3rd
Beith Juniors	Beith	Bellsdale Park	Stevie Easton	7th
Clydebank	Clydebank	Holm Park	Billy McGhie	Super League First Division, 2nd
Cumnock Juniors	Cumnock	Townhead Park	Stevie Farrell	9th
Irvine Meadow	Irvine	Meadow Park	Chris Strain	Champions
Kilbirnie Ladeside	Kilbirnie	Valefield	Mark Crilly & Stephen Swift	8th
Kirkintilloch Rob Roy	Kirkintilloch	Adamslie Park	Jimmy Lindsay	6th
Largs Thistle	Largs	Barrfields Stadium	Pat McIlvogue	5th
Petershill	Springburn, Glasgow	Petershill Park	Willie Paterson & Scott Smith	10th
Pollok	Newlands, Glasgow	Newlandsfield Park	John Richardson	4th

=== Managerial changes ===
Club	Outgoing manager	Manner of departure	Date of vacancy	Position in table	Incoming manager	Date of appointment
Pollok	Willie Irvine	Resigned	10 October 2011	7th	John Richardson	21 November 2011
Kilbirnie Ladeside	Tommy Bryce	Resigned	3 March 2012	12th	Mark Crilly & Stephen Swift	12 March 2012
Arthurlie	Sandy MacLean	Sacked	4 March 2012	9th	Mark Cameron	4 March 2012

== Table ==
Pos	Team	Pld	W	D	L	GF	GA	GD	Pts	Qualification or relegation
1	Irvine Meadow (C)	22	15	3	4	54	25	+29	48	Qualification for 2012–13 Scottish Cup
2	Petershill	22	12	7	3	47	26	+21	43	
3	Auchinleck Talbot	22	11	6	5	42	21	+21	39	
4	Clydebank	22	12	3	7	45	32	+13	39	
5	Beith Juniors	22	10	5	7	31	30	+1	35	
6	Ashfield	22	9	7	6	46	36	+10	34	
7	Arthurlie	22	9	3	10	41	41	0	30	
8	Kirkintilloch Rob Roy	22	8	4	10	36	46	−10	28	
9	Cumnock Juniors	22	6	7	9	38	50	−12	25	
10	Pollok (O)	22	7	2	13	34	45	−11	23	Qualification for West Region League play-off
11	Largs Thistle (R)	22	4	5	13	20	44	−24	17	Relegation to Super League First Division
12	Kilbirnie Ladeside (R)	22	2	2	18	25	63	−38	8	Relegation to Super League First Division

Updated to match(es) played on 4 June 2012. Source: SJFA
Rules for classification: 1) points; 2) goal difference; 3) number of goals scored.
(C) Champions; (O) Play-off winners; (R) Relegated

== Results ==
Home \ Away	ART	ASHF	AUC	BEI	CLY	CMN	IVM	KLB	KRR	LRG	PSH	PLK
Arthurlie		1–1	1–4	0–3	1–4	3–3	2–4	3–1	0–1	4–0	3–4	4–0
Ashfield	2–5		3–0	2–3	1–1	4–1	3–1	6–1	1–1	1–2	2–2	4–0
Auchinleck Talbot	2–3	9–1		0–0	2–0	2–1	1–2	3–1	1–3	0–0	2–0	5–3
Beith Juniors	2–1	1–2	2–1		0–3	2–1	0–4	2–0 (Note: Match played behind closed doors at Toryglen Regional Football Centre, Glasgow, due to previous crowd disturbance at this fixture.)	2–1	0–1	1–1	2–0
Clydebank	2–4	0–3	0–0	2–0		2–5	3–1	3–0	3–0	1–0	0–1	3–1
Cumnock Juniors	2–0	2–1	1–1	1–1	1–1		0–6	2–0	1–3	2–0	2–3	3–2
Irvine Meadow	3–1	2–0	0–0	3–1	2–1	2–2		4–2	6–1	2–0	1–2	2–1
Kilbirnie Ladeside	0–1	0–0	0–4	0–2 (Note: Match played at Maryhill F.C. due to previous crowd disturbance at this fixture.)	0–2	8–2	0–3		1–5	3–3	1–5	2–4
Kirkintilloch Rob Roy	0–1	2–5	0–3	3–3	3–2	1–1	2–3	2–1		0–2	1–1	1–0
Largs Thistle	0–3	0–2	0–1	1–1	1–4	3–3	0–1	0–2	4–2		1–1	0–3
Petershill	3–0	1–1	0–0	3–2	2–3	2–0	2–2	4–0	3–1	4–1		1–2
Pollok	0–0	1–1	0–1	0–1	4–5	3–2	1–0	3–2	2–3	4–1	0–2	

Updated to match(es) played on 4 June 2012. Source:
Legend: Blue = home team win; Yellow = draw; Red = away team win.

=== West Region League play-off ===
11 June 2012
19:30

Pollok	4 – 0	Renfrew
Carlo Monti 16'; Michael O'Hara 28'; Billy Jones 34', 75'	Pollok FC

Newlandsfield Park, Glasgow
13 June 2011
19:30

Renfrew	1 – 1	Pollok
Anton Heffron 62'	Pollok FC	57' (o.g.) Fraser Campbell

Western Park, Renfrew

Pollok win 5 – 1 on aggregate and retain their place in the West of Scotland Super League Premier Division for the 2012–13 season.
