= 2010–11 West of Scotland Super League Premier Division =

Stagecoach West of Scotland Super League Premier Division
- Season: 2010–11
- Champions: Irvine Meadow
- Relegated: Lanark United; Rutherglen Glencairn
- Goals: 460
- Average goals/game: 3.48
- Biggest home win: Kilbirnie Ladeside 6–0 Petershill; 28 August 2010; Petershill 7–1 Rutherglen Glencairn; 27 April 2011; Irvine Meadow 6–0 Petershill; 30 April 2011
- Biggest away win: Cumnock Juniors 1–8 Irvine Meadow; 9 April 2011
- Highest scoring: Cumnock Juniors 1–8 Irvine Meadow; 9 April 2011
- Longest winning run: Irvine Meadow (6); 19 February 2011 - 23 April 2011
- Longest unbeaten run: Auchinleck Talbot (9); 13 November 2010 - 30 April 2011; Kilbirnie Ladeside (9); 20 April 2011 - 25 May 2011
- Longest losing run: Rutherglen Glencairn (12); 9 October 2010 - 27 April 2011

The 2010–11 West of Scotland Super League Premier Division was the ninth Super League Premier Division competition since the formation of the Scottish Junior Football Association, West Region in 2002. The season began on August 21, 2010. Beith Juniors were the reigning champions. The winners of this competition gain direct entry to round one of the 2011–12 Scottish Cup.

== Table ==
Pos	Team	Pld	W	D	L	GF	GA	GD	Pts	Qualification or relegation
1	Irvine Meadow (C)	22	17	2	3	60	26	+34	53	Qualification for 2011–12 Scottish Cup
2	Arthurlie	22	12	4	6	32	26	+6	40	
3	Auchinleck Talbot	22	11	4	7	48	30	+18	37	
4	Pollok	22	9	5	8	38	34	+4	32	
5	Largs Thistle	22	9	5	8	34	33	+1	32	
6	Kirkintilloch Rob Roy	22	9	4	9	40	48	−8	31	
7	Beith Juniors	22	8	6	8	45	36	+9	30	
8	Kilbirnie Ladeside	22	7	6	9	39	35	+4	27	
9	Cumnock Juniors	22	7	5	10	32	47	−15	26	
10	Petershill (O)	22	7	4	11	36	44	−8	25	Qualification for West Region League play-off
11	Lanark United (R)	22	6	4	12	32	44	−12	22	Relegation to Super League First Division
12	Rutherglen Glencairn (R)	22	2	7	13	24	57	−33	13	Relegation to Super League First Division

Updated to match(es) played on 8 June 2011. Source: SJFA
Rules for classification: 1) points; 2) goal difference; 3) number of goals scored.
(C) Champions; (O) Play-off winners; (R) Relegated

== Results ==
Home \ Away	ART	AUC	BEI	CMN	IVM	KLB	KRR	LANA	LRG	PSH	PLK	RUG
Arthurlie		2–1	0–0	0–0	3–4	3–2	2–1	1–0	2–1	1–0	1–4	2–0
Auchinleck Talbot	2–0		0–1	3–0	1–2	6–2	5–1	2–2	1–1	1–3	2–1	1–1
Beith Juniors	0–0	2–3		1–0	2–3	1–1	1–3	3–0	6–2	0–3	4–1	2–2
Cumnock Juniors	1–4	0–2	1–3		1–8	1–1	5–2	2–2	3–2	0–4	2–3	4–2
Irvine Meadow	1–2	0–1	3–2	2–1		2–1	4–1	5–1	3–0	6–0	1–0	3–3
Kilbirnie Ladeside	1–2	4–2	1–2	1–0	1–2		6–1	0–2	0–1	6–0	1–0	2–1
Kirkintilloch Rob Roy	2–1	2–1	4–3	1–2	1–3	4–2		1–0	1–3	2–2	2–2	2–0
Lanark United	2–3	2–6	2–1	2–2	1–0	0–2	2–3		3–0	1–3	1–4	3–0
Largs Thistle	1–0	2–1	2–0	1–2	1–2	1–1	2–2	0–0		2–0	1–0	5–2
Petershill	0–2	1–2	3–3	0–0	1–2	2–2	1–0	4–2	1–5		1–2	7–1
Pollok	1–1	1–1	0–6	1–2	2–2	1–1	0–3	2–1	2–0	2–0		5–1
Rutherglen Glencairn	2–0	0–4	2–2	2–3	0–2	1–1	1–1	0–3	1–1	2–0	0–4	

Updated to match(es) played on 8 June 2011. Source: SJFA
Legend: Blue = home team win; Yellow = draw; Red = away team win.

== West Region League play-off ==
4 June 2011
14:00

Glenafton Athletic	0 – 0	Petershill

Loch Park, New Cumnock
8 June 2011
19:15

Petershill	1 – 0	Glenafton Athletic

Petershill Park, Glasgow

Petershill win 1 – 0 on aggregate and retain their place in the West of Scotland Super League Premier Division for the 2011–12 season.
