= 2008–09 Scottish Junior Cup =

Tournament details
- Country: Scotland

Final positions
- Champions: Auchinleck Talbot
- Runners-up: Clydebank

The 2008–09 Scottish Junior Cup was a competition in Scottish Junior football. It was won by Auchinleck Talbot after they defeated Clydebank 2–1 in the final which had an attendance of 8,122.

Under a 2007 rule change, the Junior Cup winners (along with winners of the North, East and West regional leagues) qualify for the senior Scottish Cup; Auchinleck Talbot therefore competed in the 2009–10 Scottish Cup.

== First round ==
These ties were scheduled to take place on Saturday, TBC.

Home team	Score	Away team

== Second round ==
These ties were scheduled to take place on Saturday, TBC.

Home team	Score	Away team

== Third round ==
These ties were scheduled to take place on Saturday, TBC

Home team	Score	Away team

== Fourth round ==
These ties were scheduled to take place on Saturday, TBC.

Home team	Score	Away team
Ashfield	3 – 1	Annbank United
Auchinleck Talbot	9 – 0	Dundee Violet
Ballingry Rovers	1 – 1	Glenrothes
Replay	0 – 6	
Carluke Rovers	1 – 4	Camelon Juniors
Carnoustie Panmure	1 – 0	Girvan
Dunipace	0 – 4	Beith Juniors
Dyce	2 – 2	Montrose Roselea
Replay	0 – 2	
Irvine Meadow XI	4 – 1	Maryhill
Kilsyth Rangers	1 – 1	Pollok
Replay	1 – 2	
Kirkintilloch Rob Roy	4 – 0	Thornton Hibs
Newtongrange Star	3 – 1	Larkhall Thistle
Penicuik Athletic	0 – 0	Lanark United
Replay	2 – 4	
St Anthony's	0 – 1	Clydebank
Shotts Bon Accord	1 – 3	Petershill
Thorniewood United	2 – 2	Maybole
Replay	2 – 1	
Whitburn Junior	1 – 2	Arthurlie

== Fifth round ==
These ties were scheduled to take place on Saturday, TBC.

Home team	Score	Away team
Arthurlie	1 – 0	Camelon
Auchinleck Talbot	3 – 1	Beith
Clydebank	3 – 3	Carnoustie Panmure
Replay	1 – 1	
Penalties	4 – 3	
Irvine Meadow XI	2 – 2	Ashfield
Replay	3 – 2	
Kirkintilloch Rob Roy	3 – 0	Glenrothes
Lanark United	1 – 2	Newtongrange Star
Montrose Roselea	0 – 0	Petershill
Replay	1 – 2	
Thorniewood United	1 – 3	Pollok

== Quarter finals ==
These ties were played on Saturday, TBC.

Home team	Score	Away team
Auchinleck Talbot	1 – 1	Arthurlie
Replay	3 – 1	
Irvine Meadow XI	0 – 2	Pollok
Newtongrange Star	0 – 2	Kirkintilloch Rob Roy
Petershill	1 – 2	Clydebank

== Semi-finals ==
These ties were played on Saturday, TBC.

Home team	Score	Away team	Att	Comments
Pollok	2 – 3	Clydebank	1,480	
Clydebank	0 – 1	Pollok	1,629	@ Vale of Leven FC
Agg	3 – 3			Clydebank won 4-1 on pens
Kirkintilloch Rob Roy	0 – 0	Auchinleck Talbot	1,321	
Auchinleck Talbot	1 – 0	Kirkintilloch Rob Roy	1,400	
Agg	1 – 0			Auchinleck Talbot won

== Final ==
The final took place on Sunday, TBC.

Home team	Score	Away team	Att	Comments
Auchinleck Talbot	2 – 1	Clydebank	8,122	BBC Report
