= History of football in Clydebank =

The town of Clydebank in West Dunbartonshire, Scotland has been home to, and given its name to, several football teams since 1888. Five of these teams have shared a name, Clydebank F.C., but all are distinct entities.

== History ==
=== 19th Century ===
The first senior team in the town was Yoker, named for the neighbouring Glasgow district of Yoker, and formed in 1876, followed swiftly by Dalmuir Thistle, who claimed a formation date of 1878. Neither survived into the 20th century.

The oldest continuing club is Yoker Athletic formed in 1886, playing their home games at Holm Park in Clydebank.

The first senior club to represent the town by name was Clydebank, formed in 1888. The team played home matches at Hamilton Park and entered the Scottish Cup several times, making their last appearance in the competition proper in the 1893–94 competition. In addition they were members of the Scottish Federation (league) from 1891 to 1893. The club folded in 1895, but a new Clydebank was founded in 1899, with this second incarnation also based at Hamilton Park, but only lasting a season. Two other senior clubs from Clydebank existed in the 1890s. In 1890, a junior side, Clydebank Athletic, also turned senior, winning one tie in the Scottish Cup, but folded within a few seasons, and in 1895 another junior club, Clydebank United, took over the remnants of Dalmuir Thistle and played as a senior club for a season.

=== 20th Century ===
In 1900 Duntocher F.C., based in the neighbouring village of Duntocher, moved to Clydebank and changed name to Clydebank Juniors. The club, formed in 1899, was the result of a breakaway from another local junior club, Duntocher Hibernian. The newly located club played their home games at Kilbowie Park in Clydebank.

Clydebank F.C. had retained their membership of the Scottish Football Association (SFA), but by 1902 the club became defunct. A new club, also named Clydebank, were formed in 1914 and were immediately elected to the Scottish Football League. The club joined the newly formed Division Two, playing their home games at Clydeholm. During their time in the league, they were runners-up in Division Two twice, in 1922-23 and 1924-25 before resigning from the SFL and disbanding in 1931. The following year Yoker Athletic won the Scottish Junior Cup.

Between 1930 and 1950 Clydebank Juniors won a number of Junior Football prizes, including five Central League titles, one Intermediate League, two West Of Scotland Junior Cups and, most notably, the 1942 Scottish Junior Cup. The club's ground was rebuilt on the same site in 1939, and whilst retaining its original name was often referred to as "New Kilbowie".

In 1964 the owners of East Stirlingshire F.C., Jack and Charlie Steedman, merged the Falkirk-based team with Clydebank Juniors, naming the new entity East Stirlingshire Clydebank F.C.. ES Clydebank inherited East Stirlingshire's place in Division Two and played their home games at New Kilbowie. The merge, which was opposed by fans of both clubs, lasted only one season, with East Stirlingshire shareholders winning several court cases against it. East Stirlingshire reverted to its original legal status and moved back to Falkirk, parting company with the Steedman brothers. During the single season as E.S. Clydebank, the club set a record attendance at Kilbowie Park when 14,900 spectators attended a Scottish Cup first round replay against Hibernian in February 1965.

In the wake of the failed merger, the Steedman brothers formed a new club, Clydebank F.C., in 1965. The club played its first season in the Combined Reserve League, competing against Jordanhill Training College, Glasgow Corporation Transport, and the Third XI's of the Old Firm, before being elected to the Scottish League in 1966.

Clydebank won the 1975–76 Second Division, gaining promotion with it. The following season they finished second in the First Division, and were promoted to the top flight of Scottish football for the first time, becoming the first club to play in all three Scottish League divisions after league reconstruction in 1975. They finished bottom in their first season and were relegated. The club finished second in Division One again in 1984–85 but as before finished bottom of the Premier Division on reaching the top flight. League reconstruction spared them from relegation, but they finished one from bottom in 1986–87 and were demoted back to the First Division. In 1990, whilst still a First Division club, they reached the Scottish Cup semi-final.

New Kilbowie was sold by the Steedmans in 1996 and a promised new stadium in the town failed to materialise. Clydebank spent six years playing "home" games at first Boghead Park, Dumbarton, followed by Cappielow Park, Greenock, with the inevitable decline in support. The Steedman family sold the club to Dr John Hall, a Bermuda-based businessman, and the proceeds from Kilbowie Park were used to set up schools for the sport in America.

When the combined efforts of United Clydebank Supporters (UCS), the Football Association of Ireland, the Scottish Football Association and the Scottish Football League brought about the rejection of a move to Dublin, the owners made a number of attempts to relocate the club as a franchise to a number of alternative towns — including Galashiels and Carlisle. During this period, the club were reduced to operating from a single cramped portable cabin. At the end of the 1999–2000 season, Clydebank were relegated from the First Division after winning just one game all season achieving only 10 points.

=== 21st Century ===
In 2002 the Airdrie-based club Airdrieonians was put into liquidation. A consortium led by Jim Ballantyne put forward a bid to fill the vacancy in the SFL and build a new club in Airdrie from scratch. That bid was unsuccessful, but the new club then turned their attention to buying out Clydebank's few assets from their administrators. Having outbid UCS for them, the club was moved to Airdrie as Airdrie United and under that title took their place in the Second Division for the 2002–03 season.

Members of UCS convened during the 2002–03 season with the intention of forming a phoenix club. Airdrie United Ltd agreed to voluntarily transfer their unwanted ownership of the name and insignia of Clydebank F.C. to UCS, and a venue for matches in the Clydebank area was secured following an agreement to ground share with Drumchapel Amateurs at Glenhead Park, Duntocher. The new club, the fifth to carry the name Clydebank F.C., entered the West Region structure of the Scottish Junior Football Association in 2003–04, won the league and gained promotion from Central League Division Two. In 2006–07 the club were promoted to Super League Division One.

In June 2008, Clydebank and Drumchapel agreed to terminate their groundsharing agreement, with the Bankies moving across the town to share Holm Park with Yoker Athletic. Clydebank reached the 2008–09 Scottish Junior Cup final, but lost 2–1 to Auchinleck Talbot. 2010-11 saw both Holm Park clubs gaining promotion, Yoker winning Central League Second Division and Clydebank finishing second in West Super League First Division. Yoker were again promoted the following season to join the Super First. Clydebank were relegated back to join Yoker in Super First at the end of 2015, with the two clubs again diverging at the end of 2016-17 as Clydebank were promoted and Yoker relegated.

Clydebank left Holm Park for one season in 2018–19 to groundshare with Maryhill F.C. at Lochburn Park in Maryhill, Glasgow, returning the following season. In June 2020, Clydebank opted not to retain their SJFA membership after all SJFA West Region teams moved to the newly formed West of Scotland League.

== List of clubs ==
- Yoker Athletic F.C. (1886–present) - named for a district of Glasgow, but play in Clydebank
- Clydebank F.C. (1888–95)
- Clydebank (1899-1902)
- Clydebank F.C. (1914–1931)
- Clydebank Juniors F.C. (1899–1964) - formed in Duntocher as Duntocher F.C., moved and changed name in 1900
- East Stirlingshire Clydebank F.C. (1964–65) - merger of Clydebank Juniors F.C. and East Stirlingshire F.C., moved to Falkirk and renamed in 1965
- Clydebank F.C. (1965–2002) - bought by Airdrie United and moved to Airdrie in 2002
- Clydebank F.C. (2003–present)
