= John Wight (footballer) =

Scottish footballer (born 1973)

Personal information
- Full name: John Wight
- Date of birth: 11 December 1973 (age 52)
- Place of birth: Scotland
- Position: Goalkeeper

Senior career*
Years	Team	Apps	(Gls)
2000–2006	Dumbarton	43	(0)
2006–2007	Beith Juniors		
2007–2008	Livingston		
2009-2010	Stranraer		
- * Club domestic league appearances and goals

John Wight (born 11 December 1973) is a Scottish former footballer. He played as a goalkeeper for Stranraer and Dumbarton.

== Career ==
Wight joined Dumbarton F.C. from Beith Juniors F.C. as the third goalkeeper. He soon became No. 2 to John Hillcoat, and became the starting goalkeeper after Hillcoat left the club.

Wight spent six seasons with Dumbarton, his debut coming in a 3–2 home defeat to Hamilton Accies on 14 October 2000. He went on to make 43 appearances for the Sons, most notably saving the injury time penalty which assured Sons of promotion at the end of the 2001–2002 season. Wight missed most of the 2003–2004 season due to a cruciate ligament injury.

After leaving Dumbarton, Wight had a trial with Stranraer in the summer of 2006, but went back to Beith Juniors after the two sides were unable to agree a contract. Following a spell at Livingston, he eventually went on to sign for Stranraer but was used mostly as a substitute.

== Personal life ==
As of 2006, Wight worked in the whisky industry.

== Honours ==
Dumbarton

- Scottish Football League Third Division second-place promotion: 2001-02
