= McGarr =

McGarr is a surname. Notable people with the surname include:

- Chippy McGarr (1863-1904), baseball player
- Ernie McGarr (born 1944), Scottish footballer
- Frank James McGarr (born 1921), American judge
- Lionel C. McGarr (1904-1988), United States Army lieutenant general
- Peter McGarr (born 1953), English composer
