= Brian McGinty =

Scottish footballer

Personal information
- Full name: Brian McGinty
- Date of birth: 10 December 1976 (age 49)
- Place of birth: East Kilbride, Scotland
- Positions: Midfielder; striker

Youth career
- –1994: Rangers

Senior career*
Years	Team	Apps	(Gls)
1994–1997	Rangers	3	(0)
1997–1999	Hull City	53	(6)
1999	Scarborough	8	(0)
1999	Airdrieonians	4	(0)
2000	Portadown		
2000	Dumbarton	1	(0)
2000–2001	Cumnock		
2001–2007	St Mirren	110	(16)
2006	→ Dundee (loan)	6	(1)
2007–2011	Irvine Meadow		
2011–2014	Pollok		
2014–2015	Bellshill Athletic		

Managerial career
- 2015: Bellshill Athletic
- 2016–2017: Rossvale
- 2017–2020: Irvine Meadow
- 2021–2023: Cumnock Juniors
- * Club domestic league appearances and goals as of 19:05, 27 July 2024 (UTC)

Brian McGinty (born 10 December 1976) is a Scottish former professional footballer. After beginning his career with Rangers in the Scottish Football League Premier Division he later played league football in both Scotland and England.

== Playing career ==
Born in East Kilbride, McGinty came through the youth system at Rangers. He made his Premier Division debut in January 1995 against Partick Thistle but only made a further three appearances in as many seasons. Former Rangers striker Mark Hateley signed McGinty for Hull City in November 1997 and he played over fifty games for the club before leaving for Conference side Scarborough on a short-term deal in August 1999.

McGinty returned to Scotland for a spell at Airdrie but moved on to Irish League side Portadown where he broke his leg in April 2000. On his recovery, McGinty played one match for Dumbarton in August 2000 but he signed for Cumnock Juniors later that month.

McGinty stepped back up to senior football when Tom Hendrie signed him for St Mirren in November 2001. In spite of injury problems which included a Bell's palsy affliction in 2002–03, he appeared 137 times in all competitions for the Paisley side before his contract was cancelled by mutual consent in April 2007.

McGinty dropped back to the Junior grade with Irvine Meadow in the summer of 2007. In a successful period for the Ayrshire side, he won league titles in 2009 and 2011 and was part of the first Junior side to face an SPL side in the Scottish Cup when Meadow reached the fourth round in 2009–10. McGinty moved on to fellow Junior side Pollok in June 2011, and became part of the coaching staff under manager Stephen Docherty in October 2013.

== Coaching career ==
A further move to Bellshill Athletic in January 2014 saw him become manager of the club almost exactly a year later when incumbent boss Robert Downs joined Arthurlie.

McGinty left Bellshill in May 2015 having led the club to promotion to the West of Scotland Super League First Division. He re-entered the Junior game as Rossvale manager in March 2016 before returning to his former club, Irvine Meadow, as manager in October 2017 On 28 January 2020 he resigned his managerial position at Irvine Meadow.

On 1 December 2021, after more than a year out of the game, McGinty was appointed manager of fellow West of Scotland Football League club Cumnock Juniors. He left Cumnock in June 2023, citing health reasons for his departure.
