= Scott Murdoch =

Scottish footballer

Personal information
- Full name: Scott McKenzie Murdoch
- Date of birth: 27 February 1969 (age 57)
- Place of birth: Glasgow, Scotland
- Position: Midfielder

Youth career
- Clydebank BC

Senior career*
Years	Team	Apps	(Gls)
1987–2001	Clydebank	225	(5)
2001–2002	Dumbarton	5	(0)
2002–2003	Albion Rovers	3	(0)
- * Club domestic league appearances and goals

Scott McKenzie Murdoch (born 27 February 1969) was a Scottish footballer who played 'senior' for Clydebank, Dumbarton and Albion Rovers.
