= Clydebank F.C. =

Association football club based in Clydebank, Scotland

Clydebank
- Full name: Clydebank Football Club
- Nickname: The Bankies
- Founded: 2003; 23 years ago
- Ground: Holm Park, Clydebank
- Capacity: 1,200
- Coordinates: 55.8925°N 4.3919°W
- Owner: United Clydebank Supporters
- Chairman: Grace McGibbon
- Manager: Gordon Moffat
- League: Lowland League West
- 2025–26: Lowland League, 2nd of 18
- Website: www.clydebankfc.com
| Home colours | Away colours |

Clydebank Football Club are a Scottish football club based in the town of Clydebank, West Dunbartonshire. Formed in 2003, they are currently a member of the Lowland League West.

The current Clydebank are a phoenix club formed after the previous Clydebank were bought out by Airdrieonians F.C. and moved to Airdrie. Supporters currently fund the club.

== History ==
=== Background ===
In 1888 the first club by the name of Clydebank F.C. was formed. This team played home matches at Hamilton Park and competed in the Scottish Federation from 1891 to 1893. They folded in 1895, and were followed by another Clydebank F.C. in 1899 who soon became defunct in 1902. In 1900, Junior Football team, Duntocher F.C., based in the neighbouring village of Duntocher, moved to Clydebank and changed their name to Clydebank Juniors.

A third club named Clydebank F.C. were formed in 1914. Playing their home games at Clydeholm they immediately joined the Scottish Football League, but by 1931 they had disbanded. In 1964 the owners of East Stirlingshire F.C., Jack and Charlie Steedman, merged the Falkirk-based team with Clydebank Juniors, naming the new entity East Stirlingshire Clydebank F.C.. ES Clydebank inherited East Stirlingshire's place in Division Two and played their home games at New Kilbowie. The merge, which was opposed by fans of both clubs, lasted only one season, with East Stirlingshire shareholders winning several court cases against it. East Stirlingshire reverted to its original legal status and moved back to Falkirk, parting company with the Steedman brothers.

The fourth Clydebank F.C. were formed in 1965 by the Steedman Brothers. The club joined the Scottish Football League in 1966 and by 1978 had reached the Premier Division, becoming the first club to play in all Scottish League divisions after league reconstruction in 1975. Clydebank spent most of the following seasons in the First Division, but their fortunes changed around 1996 when the Steedman brothers sold their New Kilbowie ground with no new stadium to replace it. Following the sale of Kilbowie the club played "home" games at Boghead Park in Dumbarton, then Cappielow Park in Greenock. After the liquidation of Airdrieonians, a consortium led by Jim Ballantyne put forward a bid to fill the vacancy in the SFL and build a new club in Airdrie from scratch. This effort failed, so instead the group bought the ailing Clydebank, renamed them Airdrie United, and moved the club to Airdrie.

=== Founding of the phoenix club ===
During the 2002–03 season, the remaining Clydebank supporters were left without a team to follow as the transformation into Airdrie United happened too close to the beginning of the season to make alternative plans. In the following months, members of the UCS supporters' group met with the purpose of creating a new Clydebank F.C. Airdrie United Ltd agreed to voluntarily transfer their unwanted ownership of the name and insignia of Clydebank F.C. to UCS, and a venue for matches in the Clydebank area was secured following an agreement to ground share with Drumchapel Amateurs at Glenhead Park, Duntocher. For the 2002–03 season, Clydebank FC was the name used by the club's supporters team in the Scottish Supporters League.

The UCS group re-established Clydebank Football Club in 2003–04, entering the West Region structure of the Scottish Junior Football Association. The club won the league and gained promotion from Central League Division Two that season playing in front of up to 1,000 fans. In 2004–05 Clydebank finished third in Division One, missing out on a second successive promotion by one point on the last day of the season.

2005–06 saw record crowds since the rebirth of the club, with up to 1,600 watching Clydebank come within penalty kicks of reaching the last four of the Scottish Junior Cup – beaten after two 1–1 draws against Tayport. In 2006–07 the club were promoted to Super League Division One.

In June 2008, Clydebank and Drumchapel agreed to terminate their groundsharing agreement, with the Bankies moving across the town to share Holm Park with Yoker Athletic. Many ground improvements have already taken place at the long time established Junior ground.

2008–09 proved to be the most successful Clydebank season since reformation in 2003. A successful run to the final of the 2008–09 Scottish Junior Cup saw Clydebank defeat Petershill and Pollok, before falling at the final hurdle by two goals to one against Auchinleck Talbot. Around 3,700 Clydebank fans travelled to Rugby Park for the final, contributing to the total crowd of 8,122.

In 2011, the club won promotion to the West Super League Premier Division. In 2015, they were relegated to the Super League Division One. In 2017, the club won promotion back to the Super League Premier Division, where they remained until leaving Junior football.

The team were managed from their return to the Junior grade in 2003 until December 2016 by former Clydebank player Billy McGhie. Following McGhie's thirteen-year tenure, the club appointed former St Johnstone player Kieran McAnespie as their new manager in January 2017.

Due to ground improvements taking place at Holm Park, Clydebank agreed a short-term groundshare with Maryhill F.C. at Lochburn Park in Maryhill, Glasgow, for the 2018–19 season. In the 2019–20 season they returned to the newly refurbished and renamed Holm Park Community Football Academy for the foreseeable future.

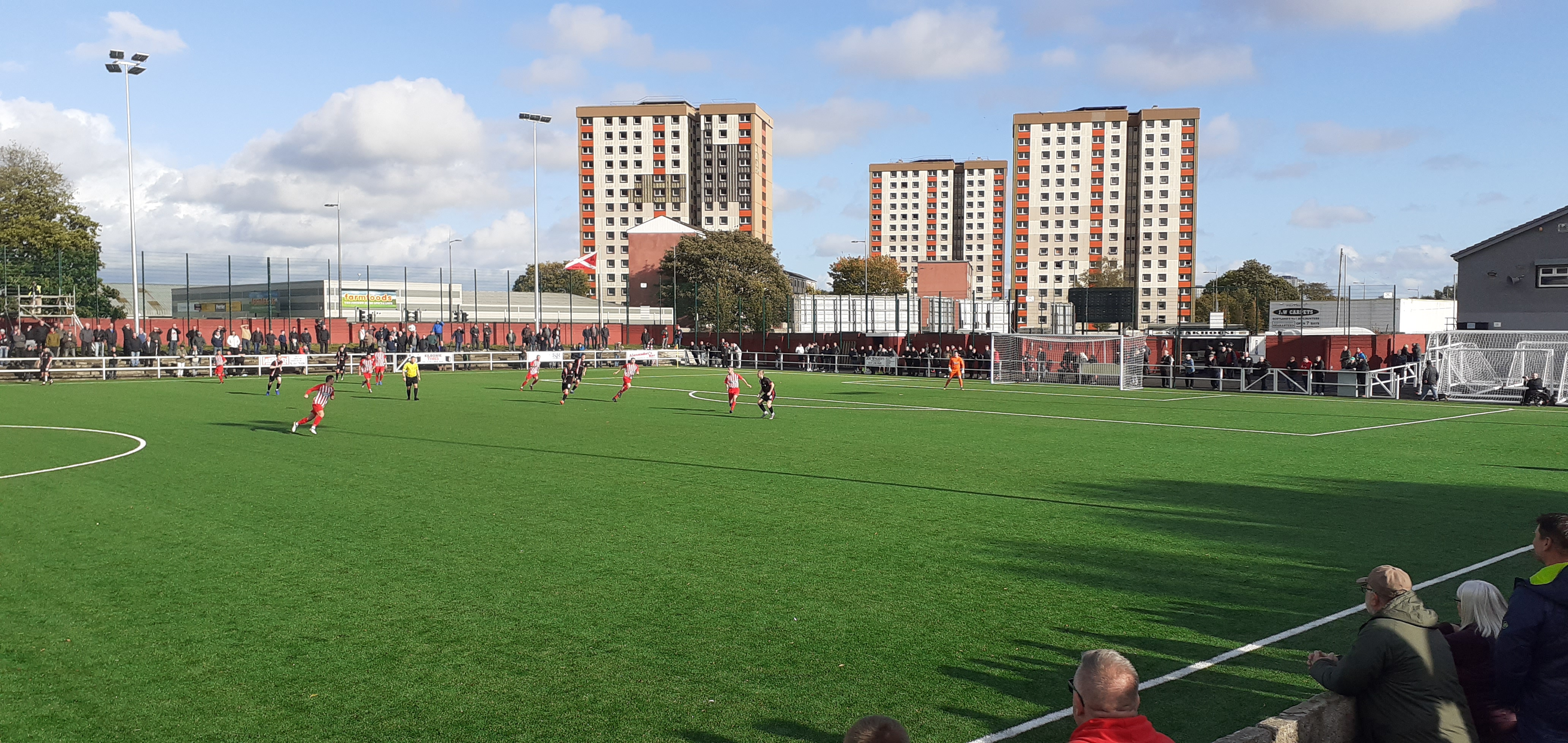
The pitch at Holm Park during a Clydebank match

In June 2020, Clydebank opted not to retain their SJFA membership after all SJFA West Region teams moved to the newly formed West of Scotland League.

== Current squad ==
As of 4 September 2026

Note: Flags indicate national team as defined under FIFA eligibility rules; some limited exceptions apply. Players may hold more than one non-FIFA nationality.

| No. | Pos. | Nation | Player |
|---|---|---|---|
| 1 | GK | SCO | Andrew Leishman |
| 2 | DF | SCO | Szymon Walczak |
| 4 | DF | SCO | Matt Niven |
| 5 | DF | SCO | Lyle Hunter (on loan from St Mirren) |
| 6 | DF | SCO | Scott Forrester |
| 7 | FW | SCO | Josh Jack |
| 8 | MF | SCO | Dean Cairns |
| 9 | FW | SCO | Ciaran Mulcahy |
| 11 | MF | SCO | Neil McLaughlin |
| 12 | GK | SCO | Owen Stott |

| No. | Pos. | Nation | Player |
|---|---|---|---|
| 14 | MF | SCO | Dom Docherty |
| 15 | DF | SCO | Oisin McHugh (Captain) |
| 16 | MF | SCO | Blair Rossiter |
| 17 | FW | SCO | Keir Samson |
| 18 | FW | SCO | Lancelot Pollard |
| 19 | DF | SCO | Chris McGowan |
| 22 | MF | SCO | Aidan Callaghan |
| 23 | MF | SCO | Nicky Low |
| 24 | DF | SCO | James Grant |
| 25 | MF | SCO | Kian Leslie |
| 26 | FW | SCO | Kieran Dolan |

=== On loan ===
Note: Flags indicate national team as defined under FIFA eligibility rules; some limited exceptions apply. Players may hold more than one non-FIFA nationality.

| No. / Pos. / Nation / Player; 3 / DF / SCO / Matthew Monaghan (On-loan at Port Glasgow) | No. / Pos. / Nation / Player; 20 / GK / SCO / Max Clarke (on-loan at Yoker Athletic) |

== Management team ==
As of 7 August 2025

| Role | Name |
|---|---|
| Manager | (Scotland) Gordon Moffat |
| Assistant Manager | (Scotland) Gary McMenamin |
| First Team Coach | (Scotland) Drew Marshall |
| First Team Coach | (Canada) Kirk Forbes |
| Player/Coach | (Scotland) Jamie Darroch |
| Goalkeeping Coach | (Scotland) Phil Bannister |
| Sports Therapists | (Scotland) Ashley Barr / Iain McKinlay |
| Kitman | (Scotland) Ross Donaldson |

== Honours ==
- West of Scotland Football League Premier Division Champions: 2024–25
- West Super League First Division Runners-up: 2010–11, 2016–17
- West of Scotland Football League Charity Cup Winners: 2025
- Central League Division Two: 2003–04
- Division One Runners-up: 2006–07
- Scottish Junior Cup Runners-up: 2008–09
- Central League Cup Winners: 2009–10, 2011–12
- Sectional League Cup Winners: 2013–14, 2017–18
  - Runners-up: 2006–07

== See also ==
- List of fan-owned sports teams
- History of football in Clydebank

== Bibliography ==
- Crampsey, Bob (1990). The First 100 Years. Glasgow: Scottish Football League. ISBN 0-9516433-0-4.
- Munro, David (2003). Clubs in Crisis. Vol. Three. Hurrah. ISBN 0-9544369-2-X.
