= 2001–02 Scottish Third Division =

Scottish Third Division
- Season: 2001–02
- Champions: Brechin City
- Promoted: Brechin City; Dumbarton

The 2001–02 Scottish Third Division was won by Brechin City who, along with second placed Dumbarton, gained promotion to the Second Division. Queen's Park finished bottom.

Location of teams in 1999–2000 Scottish Third Division

== Table ==
Pos	Team	Pld	W	D	L	GF	GA	GD	Pts	Promotion
1	Brechin City (C, P)	36	22	7	7	67	38	+29	73	Promotion to the Second Division
2	Dumbarton (P)	36	18	7	11	59	48	+11	61	Promotion to the Second Division
3	Albion Rovers	36	16	11	9	51	32	+19	59	
4	Peterhead	36	17	5	14	63	52	+11	56	
5	Montrose	36	16	7	13	43	39	+4	55	
6	Elgin City	36	13	8	15	45	47	−2	47	
7	East Stirlingshire	36	12	4	20	51	58	−7	40	
8	East Fife	36	11	7	18	39	56	−17	40	
9	Stirling Albion	36	9	10	17	45	68	−23	37	
10	Queen's Park	36	9	8	19	38	53	−15	35	

Source: "2001-2002 Third Division - SPFL Archive". SPFL.
Rules for classification: 1) points; 2) goal difference; 3) number of goals scored.
(C) Champions; (P) Promoted
