= Ernie McGarr =

Scottish footballer

Personal information
- Full name: Ernest Andrew McGarr
- Date of birth: 9 March 1944 (age 82)
- Place of birth: Glasgow, Scotland
- Position: Goalkeeper

Youth career
- Kilbirnie Ladeside

Senior career*
Years	Team	Apps	(Gls)
1965–1971	Aberdeen	43	(0)
1971–1972	Dunfermline Athletic	25	(0)
1972–1977	East Fife	118	(0)
1977–1978	Cowdenbeath	44	(0)
1978–1980	Airdrieonians	75	(0)
1980–1981	Berwick Rangers	6	(0)
- Leven Juniors
- Oakley United
- St Andrews United
Total		311	(0)

International career
1969	Scotland	2	(0)
- * Club domestic league appearances and goals

Ernest McGarr (born 9 March 1944) is a Scottish former professional footballer who played as a goalkeeper for several clubs in the Scottish Football League and was capped twice for the Scotland national side.

== Playing career ==
McGarr signed for Aberdeen in 1965 from Junior club Kilbirnie Ladeside, and made his first team debut at the end of the 1965–66 season in a friendly match versus Crystal Palace. The presence of Bobby Clark as his rival for the goalkeeping position at Pittodrie meant that first team opportunities in the early years were limited. It was only during the 1968–69 season, when a loss of form by Clark prompted manager Eddie Turnbull to give him a chance, that McGarr was able to stake his claim and secure a regular starting position.

Such was the impact that McGarr made, Scottish internationalist Clark could not regain his position, even appearing as an outfield player on two occasions. McGarr's form was itself recognised with an international call-up for a friendly game in September 1969 against the Republic of Ireland. Unfortunately, he went into the game carrying an injury picked up from a club match the previous day and only lasted 35 minutes before being substituted for Jim Herriot. He made one further appearance for the national team in November the same year, versus Austria in a FIFA World Cup qualifying match however Scotland were already unable to qualify and lost 2–0.

McGarr again lost his place in the Aberdeen side to Bobby Clark in early 1970 and later that year tabled a transfer request, eventually moving to Dunfermline Athletic in January 1971. From Dunfermline, McGarr moved to East Fife where he spent five seasons. A highlight of his spell at Bayview was a game against title chasing Celtic in February 1973 where he saved three penalty kicks in an entertaining 2–2 draw. He later played for Cowdenbeath, Airdrieonians and Berwick Rangers before finishing his career in Fife Junior football.
