= Barry Donald =

Scottish footballer

Personal information
- Date of birth: 24 December 1978 (age 47)
- Place of birth: Glasgow, Scotland
- Position: Midfielder

Youth career
- Campsie Black Watch

Senior career*
Years	Team	Apps	(Gls)
2000–2002	Stenhousemuir	39	(0)
2001–2003	Queen of the South	11	(0)
2002–2005	Dumbarton	56	(2)
2005–2007	Forfar Athletic	45	(2)
2007–2008	Albion Rovers	23	(0)
2008-2009	Linlithgow Rose		
2009–2010	Stranraer	1	(0)
- * Club domestic league appearances and goals

Barry Donald (born 24 December 1978) is a Scottish footballer who played for Stenhousemuir, Queen of the South, Dumbarton, Forfar Athletic, Albion Rovers, Linlithgow Rose and Stranraer.
