= Emeka Obidile =

Nigerian footballer

Personal information
- Full name: Emeka Aboy Obidile
- Date of birth: 27 August 1977 (age 49)
- Place of birth: Nigeria
- Height: 1.78 m (5 ft 10 in)
- Position: Midfielder

Senior career*
Years	Team	Apps	(Gls)
1997–1998	Atlas Delmenhorst	19	(1)
1998–1999	Spandauer SV	12	(3)
1999–2000	Odra Opole		
2000–2001	Petro Płock	7	(1)
2001–2002	Panserraikos	16	(1)
2002	Agios Nikolaos		
2002	Cowdenbeath		
2002–2004	Dumbarton	24	(3)
2004	Buckingham Town	1	(0)
- * Club domestic league appearances and goals

Emeka Obidile (born 27 August 1977) is a Nigerian former professional footballer who played as a midfielder.

== Career ==
Obidile began his career in the German Regionalliga, playing with Atlas Delmenhorst and Spandauer SV. He moved to Poland, where he played for Odra Opole before joining Petro Płock in early 2000. He appeared in seven Ekstraklasa matches for Petro Płock.

Obidile spent the next two seasons in Greece, making 16 Beta Ethniki appearances for Panserraikos. Following an unsuccessful trial with Livingston in January 2003, Obidile signed for Dumbarton in the Scottish Football League Second Division. He left the club in January 2004.
