= Clydebank F.C. (1888) =

Scottish football club

Clydebank
- Full name: Clydebank Football Club
- Nickname: the Bankies
- Founded: 1888
- Dissolved: 1895
- Ground: Hamilton Park
- Secretary: James Rennie
- Manager: Isaac McKay
Home colours

Clydebank Football Club was a 19th-century football club based in Clydebank, Scotland. It was the first team with that name in the town.

== History ==
The club was formed at a meeting on 17 January 1888, at a meeting in a billiard hall in Clydebank, attended by over 200 people, including representatives from football clubs such as Rangers, Queen's Park and Cowlairs; at that first meeting, Isaac McKay of 1st Lanarkshire Rifle Volunteers F.C. was appointed as coach. Most of the club's players were employees of either the J. & G. Thomson shipbuilding company or the Singer Manufacturing Co. In its first season, the club entered the Dumbartonshire Cup, losing in the second round to Dumbarton Athletic.

The club entered the Scottish Cup for the first time in 1888–89. It was drawn at home to Vale of Leven Wanderers F.C. in its first tie, who had reached the quarter-finals the previous year, and lost 4–3. Clydebank had come from 2–0 down to go 3–2 up by half-time, and after the match protested two of the Wanderers' goals, to no avail. The clubs met in the first round the following year, but at kick-off time Clydebank was short of four players. The club therefore forfeited the tie to the Wanderers, which was a mistake on two grounds - firstly, a number of angry spectators demanded refunds, and secondly, the clubs agreed to play a friendly match instead, which Clydebank won 3–1.

The club's third entry in 1890–91, was its most successful, beating Kirkintilloch Athletic F.C. in the first round and Slamannan F.C. in the second, in a re-played tie. The Bankies protested that the Slamannan goals in the original match were of the wrong height; the tie had ended 5–3 for Slamannan, with all of the scores being registered in the same goal. The run ended against Dumbarton in the third, who, despite playing well within themselves, won 6–0. Clydebank also had its best run in the county competition, reaching the semi-final, but lost to Dumbarton again, this time 4–1; Clydebank had taken the lead, but when 2–1 down was reduced to 10 men because of an injury to Melvin.

From 1891 to 1892, the Scottish Cup introduced qualifying rounds, and Clydebank did not make the main stage again. That season, the club became a founder member of the Scottish Football Federation, a de facto third national division. The club finished 9th out of 12 in its first season, the players being considered "on the slight and small side", but only registered one point in 1892–93; the first match of the season - a 12–4 defeat at the previous season's wooden spoonists Motherwell - set the tone for the season. The 'return' match - played away because of a lack of ground - was lost 16–1. The club was 3–0 up at Wishaw Thistle early in the season but the match was abandoned because of bad light with ten minutes remaining, the late start caused by the Clydebank players missing their train; Thistle won the re-played fixture 8–2. Without a ground, the club was not one of the teams that transferred into the Scottish Football Alliance on the Federation's dissolution.

Its last competitive match was a defeat in the second round of the county cup in 1893–94; the club had entered the Scottish Cup in 1894–95, but scratched before the first round. The club was formally struck off the Scottish FA register before the 1895–96 season.

== Colours ==
The club originally played in white shirts with a red band, and navy shorts. From 1890 to 1892 it played in sky and navy "quarters" (the term used for counterchanged halved shirts) with white shorts, and afterwards changed the shirts to plain navy.

== Ground ==
Clydebank secured a ground off Belmont Street soon after foundation., eventually named Hamilton Park. The club lost the use of its ground at the end of 1892, which resulted in it playing fixtures afterwards away from home.

== See also ==
- History of football in Clydebank
