= Stephen Swift (footballer) =

Scottish footballer (born 1980)

Personal information
- Date of birth: 21 July 1980 (age 46)
- Place of birth: Glasgow, Scotland
- Position: Defender

Team information
- Current team: Cumnock Juniors (manager)

Youth career
- Gleniffer Thistle

Senior career*
Years	Team	Apps	(Gls)
1996–2001	Benburb	126	(42)
2000–2002	Livingston	0	(0)
2001–2002	Cowdenbeath	33	(3)
2002–2003	Linlithgow Rose	38	(9)
2003–2006	Stranraer	104	(18)
2006–2007	Queen of the South	10	(0)
2007–2008	Ayr United	13	(2)
2008–2011	Irvine Meadow	128	(22)
2011–2012	Pollok	22	(7)
2017	Kilwinning Rangers		
Total		496	(106)

Managerial career
- 2012–2016: Kilbirnie Ladeside
- 2017–2021: BSC Glasgow
- 2021–2022: Stenhousemuir
- 2023–2024: Broomhill
- 2024–: Cumnock Juniors
- * Club domestic league appearances and goals

Stephen Swift (born 21 July 1980) is a Scottish former professional footballer, who manages West of Scotland side Cumnock Juniors.

== Career ==
Swift began his career with Benburb with whom he was capped at Junior level for Scotland. After an unsuccessful trial with Motherwell, he signed for Livingston in 2000 on a delayed transfer, finally arriving at the club in 2001. A pacy right back, Swift was loaned out to Cowdenbeath, initially on a three-month deal, however the move was made permanent and the player departed Livingston without having made a first team appearance.

Swift left Cowdenbeath in 2002 to drop back to Junior level, joining Linlithgow Rose where he was re-united with his former Benburb boss, Jim Sinnet. Stepping back up again at the end of the following season, Swift joined Stranraer where the club won the Third Division championship in his first season, then followed that with promotion to the First Division a year later. He later played for Queen of the South and Ayr United before dropping to the Juniors again, firstly with Irvine Meadow with whom he won the West Region Premier Division, West of Scotland Cup and other honours and was in the Irvine Meadow team that reached the fourth round of the Scottish Cup in 2009–10 before moving to Pollok.

Swift was appointed co-manager of Kilbirnie Ladeside in March 2012 in partnership with ex-Pollok teammate Mark Crilly and assumed sole charge following Crilly's resignation in February 2015. He led Ladeside to victory in the Ayrshire Sectional League Cup in October 2016 but resigned from his position the following month. After a short spell coaching at Largs Thistle, Swift briefly resumed his playing career with Kilwinning Rangers before joining BSC Glasgow as their new manager in April 2017. On 27 April 2021, Swift was appointed manager of League Two club Stenhousemuir. Swift departed the club in December 2022.

Swift rejoined former club BSC Glasgow, now known as Broomhill, ahead of the 2023-24 Lowland League season. Swift left Broomhill at the end of the season to take up the managerial position at Cumnock Juniors.

== Managerial record ==
As of match played 3 December 2022

Managerial record by team and tenure
Team	Nat	From	To	Record					Ref.
Team	Nat	From	To	G	W	D	L	Win %	Ref.
Stenhousemuir	(Scotland)	28 April 2021	7 December 2022	69	26	16	27	37.68	
Career Total				69	26	16	27	37.68	—
