= John McKeown (footballer) =

Scottish footballer and manager

Personal information
- Date of birth: 21 April 1981 (age 45)
- Place of birth: Glasgow, Scotland
- Position: Central defender

Team information
- Current team: Shotts Bon Accord

Youth career
- Ipswich Town

Senior career*
Years	Team	Apps	(Gls)
1999–2001	Ayr United	4	(0)
2001–2003	Dumbarton	60	(1)
2003–2005	Cowdenbeath	65	(2)
2005–2008	Stenhousemuir	35	(2)
2006–2007	→ Cumnock Juniors (delayed transfer)		
2011	Wishaw Juniors		
Total		164	(5)

Managerial career
- 2011–2014: Wishaw Juniors
- 2014–2017: Cumnock Juniors
- 2018–: Shotts Bon Accord
- * Club domestic league appearances and goals as of 10:29, 23 July 2018 (UTC)

John McKeown (born 21 April 1981) is a former professional footballer who has played for several clubs in the Scottish Football League.

== Career ==
Released by Ipswich Town as a teenager, McKeown made his league debut for Ayr United in a First Division game against Falkirk in May 2000. He later played for Dumbarton, Cowdenbeath and Stenhousemuir and had a spell at Junior level with Cumnock Juniors.

McKeown was forced to retire as a professional player at the age of twenty-seven due to problems with an arthritic hip. He re-entered the game as player-coach of Wishaw Juniors in the summer of 2011, and was appointed manager of the club in October that year, eventually leading the club to their first promotion in thirty-eight years in 2014.

In October 2014, McKeown was announced as the new manager of Cumnock Juniors. He resigned from the club in October 2017 after a successful 3-year period at the club winning The super 1st Div title and leading the club to 2 cup finals and 5 semi finals. The following month, McKeown joined the coaching staff at Cambuslang Rangers.

On the 31 May 2018 McKeown became manager of Shotts Bon Accord.
