= Paddy Flannery =

Scottish footballer

Personal information
- Full name: Patrick Flannery
- Date of birth: 23 July 1976 (age 50)
- Place of birth: Glasgow, Scotland
- Position: Striker

Team information
- Current team: Mid-Annandale (manager)

Youth career
- –1994: Eadie Star under-18s

Senior career*
Years	Team	Apps	(Gls)
1994–1997	Greenock Morton	28	(4)
1997–2003	Dumbarton	175	(78)
2003–2004	Stenhousemuir	10	(0)
2004-2005	Linlithgow Rose		
2009-2010	Linlithgow Rose		
- * Club domestic league appearances and goals as of 1 July 2005

Patrick Flannery (born 23 July 1976 in Glasgow) is a Scottish footballer. In his senior career he played for Morton, Dumbarton and Stenhousemuir, before going into Junior football with Linlithgow Rose. On 30 July 2011, Flannery played for Camelon Juniors in a preseason game against his former club Linlithgow. Whilst at Greenock Morton he was farmed out to Beith Juniors for half a season.

At Dumbarton, he went on to establish himself as one of the club's top all-time scorers. Flannery was the first player to score at the new Strathclyde Homes Stadium in a competitive fixture, netting in 3–0 win over Elgin City back in December 2000. In November 2012, he signed for junior side Rutherglen Glencairn.

After dropping out of league football, Flannery played for several clubs in the junior leagues including two spells at Linlithgow Rose.

On 2 May 2014, Paddy Flannery and John Doyle become co-managers at Cambuslang Rangers. On 25 July 2015, Paddy became manager of local amateur football team Ardrossan Castle Rovers. He then became player/manager of South of Scotland League side Mid-Annandale.
