= Craig Lynes =

Scottish footballer (born 1981)

Personal information
- Date of birth: 7 February 1981 (age 45)
- Place of birth: Edinburgh, Scotland
- Position: Midfielder

Youth career
- Hutchison Vale BC

Senior career*
Years	Team	Apps	(Gls)
1999–2001	East Stirlingshire	42	(1)
2000–2003	Dumbarton	42	(4)
2003–2004	East Fife	6	(1)
- * Club domestic league appearances and goals

Craig Lynes (born 7 February 1981) is a Scottish former footballer who played for East Stirlingshire, Dumbarton and East Fife.
