= Michael Dickie =

Scottish footballer

Personal information
- Full name: Michael John Dickie
- Date of birth: 5 May 1979 (age 47)
- Place of birth: Vale of Leven, Scotland
- Position: Defender

Youth career
- Duntocher BC

Senior career*
Years	Team	Apps	(Gls)
1999–2003	Dumbarton	106	(0)
- * Club domestic league appearances and goals

Michael John Dickie (born 5 May 1979) is a Scottish former footballer. He first signed 'senior' with Dundee but was unable to break through into the 'first' team. From there he played for Dumbarton where he was a regular in the defensive line for the club for four seasons, making over 100 appearances.

Dickie has moved into management, and in his second season in charge of the famous Dumbarton Accies F.P. he led them to their first league title in 12 years and topped it off by winning the Willie Turner Challenge Cup to make it a historic league and cup double.
