= John Hillcoat (footballer) =

Scottish footballer (born 1970)

Personal information
- Date of birth: 16 December 1970 (age 55)
- Place of birth: Paisley, Scotland
- Height: 5 ft 11 in (1.80 m)
- Position: Goalkeeper

Youth career
- Linwood Rangers
- Gleniffer Thistle
- St. Mirren

Senior career*
Years	Team	Apps	(Gls)
1992–1994	Dunfermline Athletic	13	(0)
1994–1996	Clyde	38	(0)
1996	Hamilton Academical	2	(0)
1996–1997	Partick Thistle	26	(0)
1997	Clydebank	7	(0)
1997	Hamilton Academical	1	(0)
1997–1998	Greenock Morton	9	(0)
1998–1999	Hamilton Academical	9	(0)
1999–2000	Queen of the South	22	(0)
2000–2002	Dumbarton	39	(0)
2002	St Mirren	9	(0)
2002–2003	Stranraer	27	(0)
2003–2005	Ayr United	13	(0)
2005–2007	Brechin City	6	(0)
2007–2008	Stenhousemuir	11	(0)
2008	East Stirlingshire	3	(0)
2008	St Johnstone	0	(0)
Total		235	(0)
- * Club domestic league appearances and goals

John Hillcoat (born 16 December 1970) is a Scottish former professional footballer who played as a goalkeeper.

== Career ==
=== Playing ===
Hillcoat is a former Dunfermline Athletic, Clyde, Hamilton Academical, Partick Thistle, Clydebank, Morton, Queen of the South, St Mirren, Dumbarton, Stranraer, Ayr United, Brechin City and Stenhousemuir goalkeeper.

In November 2008, Hillcoat joined St Johnstone as cover, but was then released at the end of December.

=== Coaching ===
Hillcoat left Stenhousemuir in May 2008 to take up a position as goalkeeping coach at East Stirlingshire. In December 2008 he took up a similar position at Alloa Athletic.

== Personal life ==
Hillcoat grew up in Linwood, Renfrewshire. He currently writes a column for the Sunday Mail newspaper.
