= Steven Bonar =

Scottish footballer

Personal information
- Full name: Steven Andrew Bonar
- Date of birth: 20 May 1979 (age 47)
- Place of birth: Glasgow, Scotland
- Position: Midfielder

Youth career
- Kirkintilloch Rob Roy

Senior career*
Years	Team	Apps	(Gls)
1998–2000	Partick Thistle	14	(0)
1999–2000	Albion Rovers	15	(0)
1999–2005	Dumbarton	151	(10)
2004–2006	Forfar Athletic	32	(2)
2005–2007	Raith Rovers	41	(1)
2007–2008	Stranraer	24	(1)
2008–2009	Berwick Rangers	27	(1)
- * Club domestic league appearances and goals

Steven Andrew Bonar (born 20 May 1979) is a Scottish former footballer, who played for Partick Thistle, Albion Rovers, Dumbarton, Forfar Athletic, Raith Rovers, Stranraer and Berwick Rangers
