= John Dillon (footballer, born 1978) =

Scottish footballer

Personal information
- Full name: John Peter Dillon
- Date of birth: 16 December 1978 (age 47)
- Place of birth: Vale of Leven, Scotland
- Position: Midfielder

Youth career
- Kilmarnock

Senior career*
| Years | Team | Apps | (Gls) |
| 1997–1999 | Clyde | 2 | (0) |
| 1999–2007 | Dumbarton | 240 | (28) |
| 2007–2008 | Stenhousemuir | 22 | (3) |
| 2008–2009 | Berwick Rangers | 28 | (3) |
- * Club domestic league appearances and goals

John Peter Dillon (born 16 December 1978) is a Scottish former footballer who played for Clyde, Dumbarton, Stenhousemuir and Berwick Rangers.

Dillon married Sharon Crawford on 30 May 2009 at St Mary's Church, Duntocher, with the reception at Seamill Hydro Hotel on the Ayrshire coast. Their wedding was featured in the magazine Real Life Weddings.
