= Danny McKelvie (footballer) =

Scottish footballer

Personal information
- Full name: Daniel McKelvie
- Date of birth: 6 June 1980 (age 46)
- Place of birth: Paisley, Scotland
- Position: Forward

Youth career
- Beith

Senior career*
Years	Team	Apps	(Gls)
1996–2001	Clydebank	57	(4)
2001–2003	Dumbarton	26	(0)
- * Club domestic league appearances and goals

Daniel McKelvie (born 6 June 1980) is a Scottish footballer who played 'senior' for Clydebank and Dumbarton.
