= Stephen Jack =

Scottish footballer

Personal information
- Full name: Stephen John Jack
- Date of birth: 27 March 1971 (age 55)
- Place of birth: Bellshill, Scotland
- Positions: Full back; midfielder

Youth career
- Queens Park Youth

Senior career*
| Years | Team | Apps | (Gls) |
| 1987–1992 | Queen's Park | 105 | (1) |
| 1992–1996 | Clydebank | 130 | (8) |
| 1996–1997 | Stirling Albion | 15 | (0) |
| 1997–1998 | Cowdenbeath | 1 | (0) |
| 1997–2003 | Dumbarton | 137 | (1) |
- * Club domestic league appearances and goals

Stephen John Jack (born 27 March 1971) is a Scottish former footballer who played for Queen's Park, Clydebank, Stirling Albion, Cowdenbeath and Dumbarton.
