= Craig McEwan (footballer) =

Scottish footballer, coach, and manager

Personal information
- Full name: Craig George McEwan
- Date of birth: 3 October 1977 (age 49)
- Place of birth: Glasgow, Scotland
- Height: 5 ft 8 in (1.73 m)
- Position: Full-back

Team information
- Current team: Cumnock Juniors (assistant manager)

Senior career*
Years	Team	Apps	(Gls)
1995–1997	Clyde	35	(0)
1997–2000	Raith Rovers	95	(1)
2000–2002	Ayr United	47	(1)
2002–2005	Dumbarton	77	(8)
2005–2007	Brechin City	28	(0)
2007–2009	Stenhousemuir	41	(1)
2009–2010	Linlithgow Rose		
2010	Pollok		
2010–2014	Glenafton Athletic		
2014–2015	Arthurlie		
2015–2020	Glenafton Athletic		

International career
1997–1999	Scotland under-21	17	(0)

Managerial career
- 2014–2015: Arthurlie
- 2015–2020: Glenafton Athletic
- 2020–2022: St Cadoc's Y.C
- 2022–2023: Darvel (assistant manager)
- 2023: Darvel (co-interim manager)
- 2023–2024: Broomhill (assistant manager)
- 2024–: Cumnock Juniors (assistant manager)
- * Club domestic league appearances and goals as of 09:00, 22 April 2024 (UTC)

Craig George McEwan (born 3 October 1977 in Glasgow) is a Scottish footballer and coach, and is currently the assistant manager of Cumnock Juniors.

A right full-back, McEwan has played in the Scottish Football League First Division for Raith Rovers and Ayr United and is a former Scotland under-21 international.

== Career ==
McEwan began his career with Clyde. His string of good performances alerted other clubs, and he was transferred to Raith Rovers in 1997. After three years in Kirkcaldy, McEwan moved to Ayr United, where he would stay for the next two seasons. Three years with Dumbarton followed, before a two-year spell with Brechin City. He left Brechin in January 2007 to join Stenhousemuir in a swap deal with David Murie.

McEwan dropped to Junior level with Linlithgow Rose in February 2009 then had a spell at Pollok in 2010 before joining Glenafton Athletic in November the same year.

In October 2014, McEwan took on his first managerial position at Arthurlie, however he returned to take charge of former club Glenafton three months later.

On 11 October 2020, McEwan resigned as manager of Glenafton. The club had released a statement earlier announcing they would not be participating in the inaugural season of the West of Scotland League due to concerns relating to the COVID-19 pandemic.

St Cadoc's Y.C announced McEwan as their new manager on 21 October 2020.

McEwan would leave St Cadoc's in January 2022 and would be named the assistant manager of Darvel a couple of weeks later. In April 2023 following the departure of manager Mick Kennedy, McEwan was named as co-caretaker manager of Darvel, sharing duties with club captain Daryll Meggatt.
