= Billy McGhie (footballer, born 1961) =

Scottish footballer

Personal information
- Date of birth: 13 November 1961 (age 64)
- Place of birth: Glasgow, Scotland
- Position: Defender

Team information
- Current team: Pollok (assistant manager)

Youth career
- Clydebank BC

Senior career*
Years	Team	Apps	(Gls)
1981–87	Clydebank (1965)	177	(13)
1987–89	Partick Thistle	49	(0)
1989–94	Queen of the South	164	(13)
- Arthurlie
- Shettleston
- Petershill
2003	Clydebank		
Total		393	(27)

Managerial career
- 2003–2016: Clydebank
- 2017–2018: Kilbirnie Ladeside
- * Club domestic league appearances and goals

William "Budgie" McGhie (born 13 November 1961) is a Scottish former footballer who played as a defender for three clubs in the Scottish Football League. He is currently the assistant manager of Pollok.

== Career ==
McGhie joined Clydebank (the 1965 version) from Clydebank Boys Club in 1981 and went on to make 177 league appearances for the club in the Scottish Football League. He moved to Partick Thistle in 1987 before joining Queen of the South where he made a further 164 league appearances.

McGhie stepped down to Junior level in 1994, playing for Arthurlie, Shettleston and Petershill. He returned to Shettleston as a coach until the end of 2002–03 season.

== Managerial career ==
McGhie was appointed manager of the reformed Clydebank when the club entered the Junior grade in July 2003. He resigned after a mainly successful 13 and a half years in December 2016, having lifted four trophies as well as achieving four leaguerunners up spots In season 2008–09 he guided The Bankies to the Scottish Junior Cup Final where they narrowly lost out by the odd goal in three to Auchinleck Talbot at Rugby Park, Kilmarnock.

In May 2017, McGhie was appointed Kilbirnie Ladeside manager. In October 2018, he left Kilbirnie and shortly afterwards was confirmed as assistant manager of Pollok.

== Television work ==
He has also worked as a television pundit for BBC Alba's Junior football coverage.
