= Joe Robertson (footballer) =

Scottish footballer

Personal information
- Full name: Joseph Robertson
- Date of birth: 12 April 1977 (age 49)
- Place of birth: Glasgow, Scotland
- Position: Forward

Youth career
- Rangers BC

Senior career*
Years	Team	Apps	(Gls)
1994–1997	Clydebank	64	(7)
1998–2003	Dumbarton	142	(25)
2004–2005	East Stirlingshire	16	(7)
- * Club domestic league appearances and goals

Joseph Robertson (born 12 April 1977) is a Scottish former footballer who played for Clydebank, Dumbarton and East Stirlingshire.
