= Robert Dunn (footballer) =

Scottish footballer

Personal information
- Full name: Robert Dunn
- Date of birth: 28 June 1979 (age 47)
- Place of birth: Glasgow, Scotland
- Positions: Midfielder; forward

Youth career
- Possil YMCA

Senior career*
| Years | Team | Apps | (Gls) |
| 1997–2001 | Partick Thistle | 76 | (15) |
| 2000–2002 | Airdrie | 25 | (2) |
| 2001–2002 | Dumbarton | 13 | (4) |
| 2002–2003 | Stirling Albion | 31 | (4) |
| 2003–2004 | St Mirren | 27 | (2) |
| 2004–2005 | Dumbarton | 14 | (2) |
| 2004–2006 | Stirling Albion | 32 | (8) |
| 2006–2009 | Queen's Park | 58 | (6) |
| 2008–2009 | Stirling Albion | 5 | (0) |
- * Club domestic league appearances and goals

Robert Dunn (born 28 June 1979) is a Scottish former footballer who played for Partick Thistle, Airdrie, Dumbarton, Stirling Albion, St Mirren and Queen's Park.

== Honours ==
Airdrieonians

- Scottish Challenge Cup: 2001–02
