= Dave Stewart (Scottish footballer) =

Scottish footballer

Personal information
- Full name: David Stewart
- Date of birth: 14 August 1978 (age 48)
- Place of birth: Irvine, Scotland
- Position: Defender

Youth career
- Glenafton Athletic

Senior career*
Years	Team	Apps	(Gls)
1995–1999	Ayr United	1	(0)
1998–2003	Dumbarton	100	(5)
1999–2000	Clydebank	11	(0)
2003–2004	Forfar Athletic	11	(0)
2003–2004	Queen's Park	15	(1)
- * Club domestic league appearances and goals

David Stewart (born 14 August 1978) is a Scottish former footballer who played for Ayr United, Dumbarton, Clydebank, Forfar Athletic and Queen's Park.
