= Craig Brittain (Scottish footballer) =

Scottish footballer

Personal information
- Full name: Craig Brittain
- Date of birth: 10 January 1974 (age 52)
- Place of birth: Glasgow, Scotland
- Position: Defender

Youth career
- Ashfield

Senior career*
Years	Team	Apps	(Gls)
1997–2009	Dumbarton	295	(9)
- * Club domestic league appearances and goals

Craig Brittain (born 10 January 1974) is a Scottish former footballer. He began his career with Glasgow junior side Ashfield before turning 'senior' with Dumbarton. He spent the best part of 11 seasons with Dumbarton and was part of the promotion winning side of 2001–02

A huge favourite with the fans, 'Brittso' played his last game in a Dumbarton shirt in August 2008, missing out on the league winning celebrations at the end of that season. Brittain was loaned out to junior side Beith in October, and joined permanently in January 2009. With Beith, he won the West of Scotland Super League Premier Division title in the 2009–10 season and remained with the club until he retired in July 2013.

In 2023, as part of Dumbarton's 150th anniversary celebrations, Brittain was inducted into the Sons Hall of Fame.
