= Andy Brown (footballer, born 1976) =

Scottish footballer

Personal information
- Full name: Andrew Stewart Brown
- Date of birth: 11 October 1976 (age 50)
- Place of birth: Edinburgh, Scotland
- Position: Forward

Youth career
- St Johnstone

Senior career*
Years	Team	Apps	(Gls)
1995–1996	Leeds United	0	(0)
1995	→ Strømsgodset IF (loan)	3	(1)
1996–1997	Hull City	29	(1)
1997–1999	Clydebank	36	(3)
1999–2003	Dumbarton	129	(25)
2003–2004	Stenhousemuir	32	(5)
2004–2006	Alloa Athletic	46	(13)
- * Club domestic league appearances and goals

Andrew Stewart Brown (born 11 October 1976) is a Scottish former footballer who played for Clydebank, Dumbarton, Stenhousemuir and Alloa Athletic.
