= 2002–03 Scottish Second Division =

Scottish Second Division
- Season: 2002–03
- Champions: Raith Rovers
- Promoted: Raith Rovers; Brechin City
- Relegated: Stranraer; Cowdenbeath

The 2002–03 Scottish Second Division was won by Raith Rovers who, along with second placed Brechin City, were promoted to the First Division. Stranraer and Cowdenbeath were relegated to the Third Division.

== Table ==
Pos	Team	Pld	W	D	L	GF	GA	GD	Pts	Promotion or relegation
1	Raith Rovers (C, P)	36	16	11	9	53	36	+17	59	Promotion to the First Division
2	Brechin City (P)	36	16	7	13	63	59	+4	55	Promotion to the First Division
3	Airdrie United	36	14	12	10	51	44	+7	54	
4	Forfar Athletic	36	14	9	13	55	53	+2	51	
5	Berwick Rangers	36	13	10	13	43	48	−5	49	
6	Dumbarton	36	13	9	14	48	47	+1	48	
7	Stenhousemuir	36	12	11	13	49	51	−2	47	
8	Hamilton Academical	36	12	11	13	43	48	−5	47	
9	Stranraer (R)	36	12	8	16	49	57	−8	44	Relegation to the Third Division
10	Cowdenbeath (R)	36	8	12	16	46	57	−11	36	Relegation to the Third Division

Rules for classification: 1) points; 2) goal difference; 3) number of goals scored.
(C) Champions; (P) Promoted; (R) Relegated

== Attendance ==
The average attendance for Scottish Second Division clubs for season 2002/03 are shown below:

Club	Average
Raith Rovers	1,930
Airdrie United	1,440
Hamilton Academical	1,285
Dumbarton	950
Brechin City	620
Forfar Athletic	591
Stenhousemuir	575
Berwick Rangers	516
Cowdenbeath	500
Stranraer	432
