= Shotts Bon Accord F.C. =

Association football club in Scotland

Shotts Bon Accord Football Academy
- Full name: Shotts Bon Accord Football Academy
- Nickname: The Bonny
- Founded: 1950
- Ground: Hannah Park, Shotts
- Capacity: 3,000
- Coordinates: 55°49′31″N 3°48′26″W
- Chairman: Ian McKie
- Manager: vacant
- League: West of Scotland League Premier Division
- 2025–26: West of Scotland League Premier Division, 14th of 16
- Website: https://www.sba.teamexpert.co.uk/
Home colours	Away colours

Shotts Bon Accord Football Academy are a Scottish football club based in the town of Shotts, North Lanarkshire. The club was formed in 1950 and currently competes in the West of Scotland League Premier Division.

== History ==
In 1995 Shotts were suspended from the Central Region of the SJFA for one season, after launching court action against the organisation. The club were re-admitted to its Second Division (the third tier) in the 1996–97 season. Remarkably they won each of the league's three divisions in consecutive seasons upon their readmission.

Shotts have won the Scottish Junior Cup on two occasions, defeating Pumpherston Juniors 2–0 in 1958, and Auchinleck Talbot 2–1 in 2012.

Shotts started a Grassroots Football Academy in October 2016 and has supported Grassroots Football massively for Both Male and Female..

The Academy has 22 teams and 356 participants amongst them...

The team have been managed since May 2018 by John McKeown.

== Ground ==
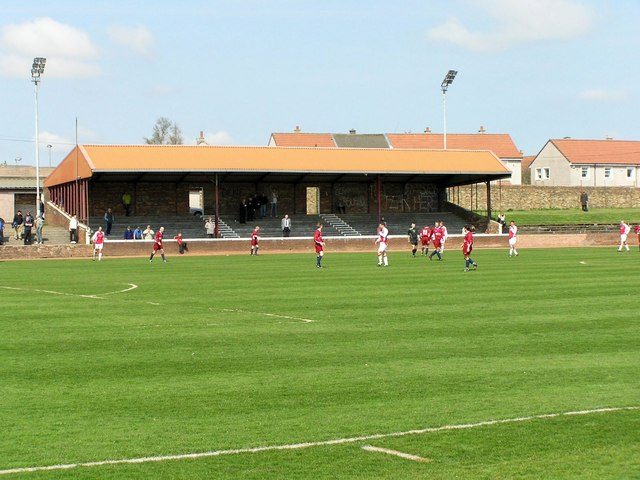
Hannah Park

Shotts Bon Accord play at Hannah Park in Shotts. There is a local social club attached.

Also the Motherwell reserve and under-19 teams have played some of their home games at the ground.

The ground was created using local volunteer labour, one of whom - James Hannah - died of thrombosis contracted during the efforts to finish. The park is named in his honour.

As well as being a football stadium, Hannah Park has also been the host venue for the annual Shotts Highland Games.

== Current squad ==
As of 29 June 2026

Note: Flags indicate national team as defined under FIFA eligibility rules; some limited exceptions apply. Players may hold more than one non-FIFA nationality.

No.	Pos.	Nation	Player
—	GK	SCO	Chris Henry
—	GK	SCO	Sandy Thomson
—	GK	SCO	Thomas Starrs
—	DF	SCO	Derin Marshall (On-loan from Dumbarton)
—	DF	SCO	Finlay Anderson
—	DF	SCO	Martin Cassells
—	DF	SCO	Joshua Gracie
—	DF	SCO	Robbie Torrance
—	DF	SCO	Sam Greenwood
—	DF	SCO	Andrew Duffy
—	DF	SCO	Layton Gillen
—	MF	SCO	Cole Stirling
—	MF	SCO	Rico De Marco
—	MF	SCO	Taylor Evans
—	MF	SCO	Jack Gordon
—	MF	SCO	Jay Nelson
—	MF	SCO	Adam Hunter
—	MF	SCO	Ally Martin
—	MF	SCO	Dylan McGuigan
—	MF	SCO	Ethan O'Neill
—	MF	SCO	Liam Craig
—	MF	SCO	Marc McKenzie
—	FW	SCO	Robbie Young
—	FW	SCO	Ally Small
—	FW	SCO	Matthew O'Donnell (on loan from Pollok)

== Coaching staff ==
Position	Name
Manager	vacant
Assistant Manager	Martin Devlin
Goalkeeping Coach	Derek Barnes
Coach	William McElholm

== Honours ==
Scottish Junior Cup

- Winners: 1957–58, 2011–12

West of Scotland Cup

- Winners: 1963–64

Lanarkshire League

- Champions: 1957–58, 1960–61, 1961–62, 1962–63, 1964–65, 1966–67, 1967–68
- League Cup winners: 1951–52, 1957–58, 1959–60, 1963–64, 1964–65, 1966–67, 1967–68

Central League

- Premier Division champions: 1998–99
- Division One champions: 1987–88, 1997–98
- Division Two champions: 1996–97
- C Division champions: 1976–77
- League Cup winners: 1993–94
- Sectional League Cup winners: 1984–85, 1988–89, 1997–98, 2010–11
- Lanarkshire Junior Cup winners: 1960–61, 1962–63
- Lanarkshire Hozier Cup winners: 1963–64
