= Irvine Meadow XI F.C. =

Association football club in North Ayrshire, Scotland

Irvine Meadow
- Full name: Irvine Meadow XI Football Club
- Nickname: The Medda
- Founded: 1897
- Ground: Meadow Park, Irvine
- Capacity: 4,364 (490 seated)
- Coordinates: 55°37′18″N 4°40′3″W
- Chairman: Bert Hogg
- Manager: Jamie McKim
- League: West of Scotland League Premier Division
- 2025–26: West of Scotland League First Division, 1st of 16 (promoted)
- Website: https://www.irvinemeadowfc.co.uk/
Home colours	Away colours

Irvine Meadow XI Football Club is a Scottish football club, based in Irvine, North Ayrshire. They currently compete in the West of Scotland League Premier Division. The club's home ground is Meadow Park in central Irvine, and they play in royal blue strips.

== History ==
Formed in 1897, they are one of the most successful Junior clubs still playing. Of the two clubs in Irvine, the other being Irvine Victoria, they are the larger. Meadow have set many attendance records at other Junior clubs' grounds and were at one stage invited to turn senior and play in the Scottish Football League.

Irvine Meadow's closest rivals are Kilwinning Rangers, based in the neighbouring town of Kilwinning, and Irvine Victoria who play on the other side of the River Irvine at Victoria Park. An annual derby fixture is played each August to coincide with Irvine's Marymass Festival. After recent dominance in the fixture over the past decade, Meadow lost 3–1 at Victoria Park in 2017, the first time in 11 years that they had not won the match.

In recent times, Irvine Meadow have another rivalry with Auchinleck Talbot, with the two often contending against each other for the regional title and cups. Talbot are sometimes regarded as Meadow's largest rivals, despite the distance between the two clubs within Ayrshire.

In 1933, the club played two minor cup finals and the replay of one of those over two days due to fixture congestion at the end of the season, winning both (they also won the regional league and another cup that year). Meadow were the first junior club in Scotland to have a home game televised when the 1958 Scottish Junior Cup tie against Fauldhouse United was shown on Scotsport. They are the only junior football club to have travelled by air to a game when they went to St. Andrew's stadium to play Birmingham City in a match in which they lost 4–3.

Between 2006 and 2012, Meadow bought players from senior teams such as Brian McGinty and Mark Crilly and did well in the Scottish Junior Cup, as well as winning promotion from the Ayrshire League in 2005–06 and from Super League Division One in 2006–07. They have had a successful period in the subsequent years with Stagecoach West Premier Super League titles in 2008–09, 2010–11 and 2011–12 as well as Evening Times and West of Scotland Cup wins.

On 28 November 2009, Meadow became the first junior club to defeat Scottish Football League opposition in a competitive fixture when they beat Arbroath 1–0 in the third round of the 2009–10 Scottish Cup in front of a crowd of over 1,100. The club were then drawn away to SPL side Hibernian in the fourth round. The game, which took place on 9 January 2010, was arguably the biggest game in the club's history. Irvine lost 3–0, but the club stood to make in the region of £55,000 from this fixture, and an estimated 2,000 Meadow fans made the journey to Edinburgh.

In the 2011–12 season, Meadow reached the third round of the Scottish Cup, where they hosted First Division side Livingston at Meadow Park. The tie took place on 19 November 2011. Meadow were well beaten 6–0.

Former players Gareth Turner and Michael Wardrope were appointed as the new management team in May 2016 to replace the departing Davie Greig, and the pair took charge for the start of the 2016–17 season. On 25 October 2017, the new management of Brian McGinty and Stevie Aitchison took over. In June 2018, Irvine Meadow gained promotion via the play-offs to the West Region Premiership for the 2018–19 season.

Brian McGinty resigned as manager on 28 January 2020.

In September 2023, former Irvine Meadow player Martin Ferry was appointed to the role of manager. Ferry will be assisted in his managerial duties by his long standing colleague Des Roache. Des, himself a former Scottish Commonwealth runner and referee.

Jamie McKim is the current Irvine Meadow manager have taken over in February 2025 where the club was third bottom of West of Scotland Football League First Division and 14 months later made them league winners in April 2026.

The club moved to the senior West of Scotland Football League along with all other West Region Junior teams in 2020. Floodlights were installed at Meadow Park in February 2021 to meet SFA licensing criteria.

== Current squad ==
As of 13 November 2026

Note: Flags indicate national team as defined under FIFA eligibility rules; some limited exceptions apply. Players may hold more than one non-FIFA nationality.

No.	Pos.	Nation	Player
—	GK	SCO	Joe Wilton
—	GK	SCO	Chris Calder
—	GK	SCO	John Lynn
—	GK	SCO	Lyle Kerr
—	DF	SCO	Shaun Gallacher
—	DF	SCO	Lyall Holding
—	DF	SCO	Jack Wilson
—	DF	SCO	Ben Ferguson
—	DF	SCO	Benji Wright
—	DF	SCO	Logan Thomson
—	DF	SCO	Kane Thomson

No.	Pos.	Nation	Player
—	MF	SCO	Dominic Boland
—	MF	SCO	Andrew Gaffney
—	MF	SCO	Jack Whittaker
—	MF	SCO	Larry McMahon
—	MF	SCO	Euan Baird
—	MF	SCO	Ross Davidson
—	FW	SCO	Kieran Brophy
—	FW	SCO	Mark Taylor
—	FW	SCO	Mark Curragh
—	FW	SCO	Danny Wilson

=== On loan ===
Note: Flags indicate national team as defined under FIFA eligibility rules; some limited exceptions apply. Players may hold more than one non-FIFA nationality.

No.	Pos.	Nation	Player
—	DF	SCO	Owen Carey (on loan at Drumchapel United)
—	MF	SCO	Mikey McPeake (on loan at Glenvale)

== Coaching staff ==
As of 10 October 2026

Position	Name
Manager	Jamie McKim
Assistant Manager	Ryan Caddis
Performance Analyst	Bernard McPhee
Goalkeeping Coach	Alan Kerr
First Team Coach	William Gemmell
Coach	Ross Fisher
Physio	Sam Taha

== Honours ==
=== Major competitions ===
- Scottish Junior Cup
  - Winners (3): 1958–59, 1962–63, 1972–73
  - Runners-up: 1947–48, 1950–51
- SJFA West Region Premiership
  - Champions (3): 2008–09, 2010–11, 2011–12

=== Minor competitions ===
- West of Scotland Cup: 1931–32, 1950–51, 1955–56, 1961–62, 1969–70, 1970–71, 1989–90, 2009–10, 2011–12
- Western League / Ayrshire First Division: 1921–22, 1932–33, 1948–49, 1950–51, 1954–55, 1956–57, 1957–58, 1960–61, 1969–70, 1970–71, 1988–89, 1993–94
- West of Scotland Football League First Division: 2025-26
- Western Intermediate League: 1928–29
- Ayrshire Second Division: 1998–99
- Stagecoach Ayrshire League: 2005–06
- Ayrshire Cup: 1898–99, 1900–01, 1903–04, 1913–14, 1931–32, 1953–54, 1957–58, 1969–70, 1970–71, 1983–84, 1984–85, 2005–06, 2006–07, 2010–11
- Ayrshire League Cup: 1927–28, 1928–29, 1950–51, 1954–55, 1955–56, 1961–62, 1982–83
- Ayrshire District Cup: 1899–1900, 1903–04, 1909–10, 1913–14, 1914–15, 1932–33, 1938–39, 1946–47, 1950–51, 1951–52, 1954–55, 1955–56, 1957–58, 1970–71, 1976–77, 1977–78, 1981–82, 1987–88
- Cunninghame District Cup: 1982–83, 1983–84, 1985–86, 1987–88, 1991–92, 1994–95
- North Ayrshire Cup: 1996–97, 2002–03
- Western Intermediate League Cup: 1927–28, 1928–29
- Irvine & District League: 1910–11
- Dryborough Cup 1972–73
- Ayrshire Consolation Cup: 1914–15, 1915–16, 1932–33
- Ayrshire Charity Cup: 1934–35
- Moore Trophy 1932–33, 1938–39
- Vernon Trophy: 1949–50, 1952–53, 1960–61
- Irvine Herald Cup: 1898–99, 1914–15, 1924–25
- St Vincent de Paul Cup:1933–34
- Evening Times Super Cup 2005–06, 2009–2010
- Stagecoach Super League First Division: 2006–07
- Kerr & Smith League Cup: 2003–04
