= Mark Crilly =

Scottish footballer and manager

Personal information
- Date of birth: 23 May 1980 (age 46)
- Place of birth: Glasgow, Scotland
- Position: Midfielder

Youth career
- Gleniffer Thistle

Senior career*
Years	Team	Apps	(Gls)
1998–2001	Ayr United	26	(1)
2001–2003	Dumbarton	44	(10)
2002–2003	Stirling Albion	12	(2)
2003–2005	St Mirren	34	(1)
2005–2006	Raith Rovers	23	(4)
2006–2007	Stranraer	23	(2)
2007–2010	Irvine Meadow		
2010–2012	Pollok		
Total		162	(20)

Managerial career
- 2012–2015: Kilbirnie Ladeside
- * Club domestic league appearances and goals

Mark Crilly (born 23 May 1980) is a Scottish professional footballer who was most recently co-manager of Junior side Kilbirnie Ladeside. Crilly began his senior career with Ayr United in 1998. He went on to play for Dumbarton, Stirling Albion, St Mirren, Raith Rovers and Stranraer, making over 150 appearances in the Scottish Football League.

Crilly was appointed co-manager of Kilbirnie Ladeside in March 2012 in partnership with ex-Pollok teammate Stephen Swift but resigned citing work commitments in February 2015.
