= Kilbirnie Ladeside F.C. =

Association football club in Scotland

Kilbirnie Ladeside
- Full name: Kilbirnie Ladeside Football Club
- Nickname: The Blasties
- Founded: 1901
- Ground: Valefield Park, Kilbirnie
- Capacity: 1,000
- Manager: Colin Spence
- League: West of Scotland League Premier Division
- 2025–26: West of Scotland League First Division, 7th of 16 (promoted)

Kilbirnie Ladeside Football Club are a Scottish football club, from Kilbirnie, North Ayrshire. Based at Valefield Park, they currently play in the West of Scotland Football League. Their main rivals are Beith Juniors. The club nickname, The Blasties, derives from a Robert Burns poem, The Inventory, written in 1786. However, a more likely reason for the nickname is the proximity of the club to the nearby blast furnaces of the former Glengarnock Steelworks.

== History ==
Kilbirnie won their first Scottish Junior Cup title in 1952 with a 1–0 victory over Camelon Juniors at Hampden Park, with over 69,000 fans in attendance. The team's Goalkeeper on the day was Tom McQueen, father of future Scotland international Gordon McQueen.

In 2020, Kilbirnie moved from the SJFA, to join the pyramid system in Scottish football as one of the inaugural members of the West of Scotland Football League.

On 10 October 2020, the club announced they would not be participating in the inaugural season of the West of Scotland League due to concerns relating to the COVID-19 pandemic, citing the inability of fans to be able to attend games as a huge issue for the club.

== Valefield Park ==
Valefield Park
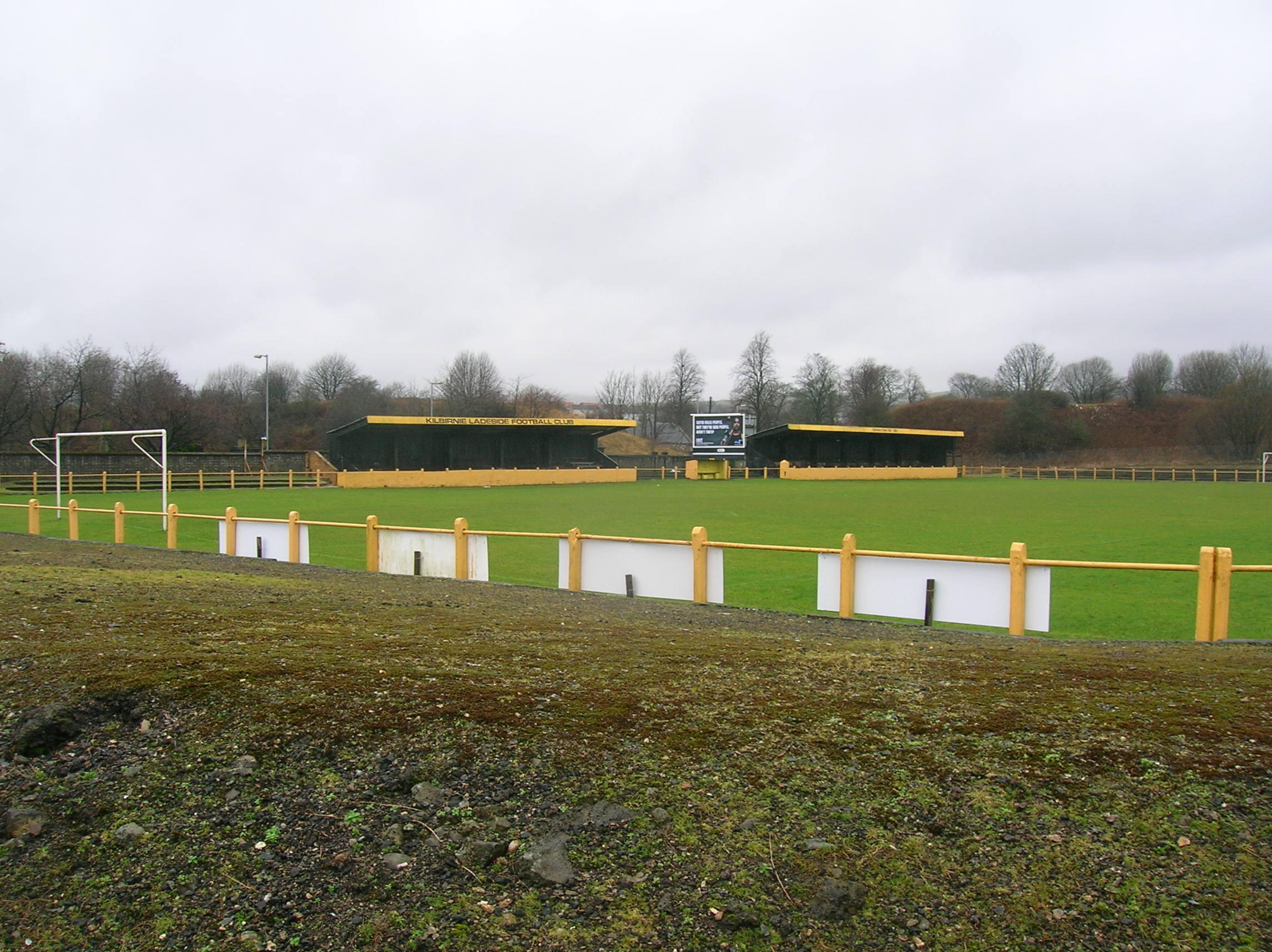
- Interactive map of Valefield Park
- Location: Kilbirnie, North Ayrshire, Scotland
- Coordinates: 55°44′43″N 4°40′58″W
- Capacity: 1,000
- Surface: Grass

Tenant
- Kilbirnie Ladeside

Valefield Park is home to Kilbirnie Ladeside. The average attendance is around two hundred (varying for cup games).

=== History ===
The Blasties' (the nickname of Kilbirnie Ladeside) original home of Ladeside Park on Mill Road was partly built on by the army during World War II and the club relocated to Valefield, the home of Glengarnock Vale, another local side. Vale did not re-appear after the war and Valefield Park became Ladeside's permanent ground. The name 'Ladeside' derives from the lade that runs near the ground from the old Nether Mill at Knoxsville Road near the Miller's Knowe.

=== Structure ===
Although the ground is small it can comfortably hold up to six hundred spectators. On the north-west side there are two main stands which were both constructed at the start of the new millennium. The ground has around four main turnstiles, two of which are located on Kirkland Road.

== Current squad ==
As of 3 July 2026

Note: Flags indicate national team as defined under FIFA eligibility rules; some limited exceptions apply. Players may hold more than one non-FIFA nationality.

No.	Pos.	Nation	Player
—	GK	NIR	Ben Fry
—	GK	SCO	Dale Burgess
—	GK	SCO	Jamie McGowan
—	GK	SCO	Calum Robertson
—	DF	SCO	Charlie Waddell (On-loan from Partick Thistle)
—	DF	SCO	Aidan Shields
—	DF	SCO	Bryan Wharton
—	DF	SCO	James Ballantyne
—	DF	SCO	Lewis Barclay
—	DF	SCO	Mickey Wilson
—	DF	SCO	Paul Doyle
—	DF	SCO	Ryan Sinnamon
—	MF	SCO	Danny Bamford
—	DF	SCO	Ruairidh Clark

No.	Pos.	Nation	Player
—	MF	SCO	Chris Black
—	MF	SCO	CJ Johnston
—	MF	SCO	Craig Forbes
—	MF	SCO	Dylan Dykes
—	MF	GRE	Kristian Gkegka
—	MF	SCO	Jamie Gallagher
—	MF	SCO	Ross Lindsay
—	FW	SCO	Scott Lewis
—	MF	SCO	Ryan McCubbin
—	FW	SCO	Alex Bell
—	FW	SCO	Aaron Robertson
—	FW	SCO	Sam McLoy
—	FW	SCO	Jon Scullion
—	FW	SCO	Aiden Gilmartin
—	FW	SCO	Marc Walker

== Club staff ==
Position	Name
Manager	Colin Spence
Assistant manager	Willie Lyle
Goalkeeping Coach	
Physio	

== Honours ==
Scottish Junior Cup

- Winners: 1951–52, 1976–77
- Runners-up: 1986–87

=== Other honours ===
- West of Scotland Cup winners: 2007–08
- Scottish Junior League winners: 1903–04
- Ayrshire League champions: 1975–76
- Western League champions: 1947–48, 1949–50, 1951–52, 1967–68
- Ayrshire Cup: 1912–13, 1923–24, 1947–48, 1949–50, 1971–72, 1974–75, 1975–76, 1986–87
- Western/Ayrshire League Cup winners: 1923–24, 1931–32, 1938–39, 1988–89, 1994–95, 2009–10, 2016–17

== Notable former players ==
- George Stevenson, Motherwell and Scotland.
- Ernie McGarr, Aberdeen and Scotland.
