= Cumnock Juniors F.C. =

Association football club in Scotland

Cumnock Juniors
- Full name: Cumnock Juniors Football Club
- Nickname: The Nock
- Founded: 1912
- Ground: Townhead Park, Cumnock
- Capacity: 3,000
- Coordinates: 55.4527°N 4.2586°W
- Manager: Stephen Swift
- League: Lowland League West
- 2025–26: West of Scotland League Premier Division, 2nd of 16 (promoted)
- Website: https://www.cumnockjuniors.com/
Home colours	Away colours	Third colours

Cumnock Juniors Football Club are a Scottish football club based in Cumnock, Ayrshire.

The Nock play their home games at Townhead Park and compete in the West of Scotland Football League.

== History ==
Birthed in 1912, they have a history of local and national success. Their nearest neighbours and rivals are Auchinleck Talbot. Both have shared many a hard-fought battle on the field. These matches are often looked upon as Junior football's equivalent to the "Old Firm" with passionate supporters from both sides.

In the 1970s and 1980s this game would often attract a crowd of around 6000; although it has dwindled a bit over the years, the respect and rivalry is still noticeable. A Scottish Junior Cup tie between the two sides in the mid-1970s attracted well over 8000 spectators. Cumnock won 2–1.

A "senior" team based in Cumnock also competed in the 19th century and participated in the early years of the Scottish Cup. Cumnock Juniors play in black and white. Their change strip is white and blue.

From December 2018 until late 2019, the team was managed by local boy and former Queen of the South midfielder, Paul Burns.

Tony McInally has been the manager of the club since November 2019.

In 2020, Cumnock moved from the SJFA, to join the pyramid system in Scottish football as one of the inaugural members of the West of Scotland Football League.

On 10 October 2020, the club announced they would not be participating in the inaugural season of the West of Scotland League due to concerns relating to the COVID-19 pandemic. The two main factors cited were the health and wellbeing of players under the guidelines and fans not being able to attend games.

== Current squad ==
As of 19 July 2026

Note: Flags indicate national team as defined under FIFA eligibility rules; some limited exceptions apply. Players may hold more than one non-FIFA nationality.

No.	Pos.	Nation	Player
—	GK	SCO	Blair Currie
—	GK	SCO	Aiden Russell
—	DF	SCO	Cole Burke (on loan from Queens Park)
—	DF	SCO	Darren Brownlie
—	DF	SCO	Tomas Brindley
—	DF	SCO	Andy McDonald
—	DF	SCO	Duncan Barlow
—	DF	SCO	Mark Russell
—	DF	SCO	Joseph Smith
—	DF	SCO	Ben Stoddart (on loan from St Mirren)
—	DF	SCO	Martin Gilmour
—	DF	SCO	Jack O'Rourke (on loan from St Mirren)
—	DF	SCO	Jon Craig
—	DF	SCO	Sam Ellis

No.	Pos.	Nation	Player
—	MF	SCO	Cammy Chalmers
—	MF	SCO	Grant Gallagher
—	MF	SCO	Jack Lavery (on loan from St Mirren)
—	MF	SCO	Robbie Buchanan (Captain)
—	MF	SCO	Ryan McLean
—	MF	SCO	Cameron Breadner
—	FW	SCO	Adam Forde
—	FW	SCO	Ally McColm
—	FW	SCO	Jamie Conn
—	FW	SCO	Murray McKenzie
—	FW	SCO	Ryan Edgar
—	FW	SCO	Zander Craik

== Coaching staff ==
Position	Name
Manager	Stephen Swift
Assistant Manager	Craig McEwan
Player/Coach	Grant Gallagher
Goalkeeper coach	Stephen Bryceland

== Honours ==
Scottish Junior Cup

- Winners: 1978–79, 1988–89, 2022–23
- Runners-up: 1949–50, 2007–08

SJFA West of Scotland Super League First Division

- Winners: 2015–16

South Challenge Cup

- Winners: 2025–26

=== Other honours ===
- Ayrshire Cup (7): 1915–16, 1917–18, 1948–49, 1980–81, 1989–90, 2007–08, 2009–2010
- Ayrshire District Cup (5): 1971–72, 1983–84, 1986–87, 1989–90, 2002–03
- Ayrshire First Division winners (11): 1935–36, 1936–37, 1952–53, 1971–72, 1973–74, 1980–81, 1981–82, 1983–84, 1984–85, 1995–96, 1997–98
- Ayrshire League Cup (15): 1936–37, 1948–49, 1952–53, 1966–67, 1970–71, 1976–77, 1978–79, 1983–84, 1984–85, 1985–86, 1986–87, 1995–96, 1996–97, 2000–01, 2001–02
- Ayrshire Second Division winners: 1994–95
- Ayrshire Super Cup: 1988–89, 1995–96, 1996–97
- Cumnock & Doon Cup: 1986–87, 1987–88, 1988–89
- East Ayrshire Cup: 1995–96
