= Whiteside (surname) =

Whiteside is an English surname. Notable people with the surname include:

- Abby Whiteside (1881–1956), American piano teacher
- Alan Whiteside (born 1956), South African HIV/AIDS researcher and author
- Andra Whiteside (born 1989), Fijian badminton player
- Arnold Whiteside (1911–1994), English footballer
- Aston Whiteside (born 1989), American football player
- Catharine Whiteside, Canadian physician and medical researcher
- Charles Mitchell Whiteside (1854–1924), American businessman and politician
- Chase Whiteside (born 1988), American journalist and filmmaker
- Chris Whiteside (1953–2022), English cricketer
- Dale Whiteside (1930–2021), American politician
- David Whiteside (1870–1947), Canadian politician
- Don Whiteside (1931–1993), Canadian-American sociologist, author, and civil servant
- Donald Whiteside (born 1969), American basketball player
- Eli Whiteside (born 1979), American baseball player
- Eric Whiteside (1904–1997), Indian sprinter
- Ernie Whiteside (1889–1953), English footballer
- Frank H. Whiteside (1873–1916), Canadian politician
- George Whiteside (1902–1976), Australian politician
- Hassan Whiteside (born 1989), American basketball player
- Horace Whiteside (1891–1956), American football player and coach
- J. J. Arcega-Whiteside (born 1996), American football player
- James Whiteside (1804–1876), Irish judge and politician
- James B. Whiteside (born 1984), American ballet dancer
- Jane Whiteside (1855–1875), New Zealand tightrope dancer, gymnast, and magician
- Jenkin Whiteside (1772–1822), American attorney and politician
- Jennifer Whiteside, Canadian politician
- Jim Whiteside (1924–2019), American politician
- John Whiteside (disambiguation), several people called John Whiteside
- Joseph Whiteside (1906–1990), English swimmer
- Ken Whiteside (born 1929), English professional footballer
- Kerr Whiteside (1884–1919), Scottish footballer
- Keyon Whiteside (born 1980), American football player
- Larry Whiteside (1937–2007), American sports journalist
- Lisa Whiteside (born 1985), British amateur boxer
- Matt Whiteside (born 1967), American baseball player
- Matthew Whiteside (born 1988), Northern Irish composer
- Nick Whiteside (born 2000), American football player
- Ninian E. Whiteside (1812–1876), American politician, attorney, and pioneer
- Noel Whiteside (1903–1948), British businessman and politician
- Norman Whiteside (born 1965), Northern Irish footballer
- Peter Whiteside (1952–2020), British pentathlete
- Peter Whiteside (politician) (1870–1929), Australian-born South African trade union leader and politician
- Ray Whiteside (born 1932), Indian-born Australian field hockey player
- Robert Whiteside (1950–2006), American artist and craftsman
- Roger Whiteside (born 1958), British businessman
- Samuel Whiteside (1783–1868), American pioneer and politician
- Sean Whiteside (born 1971), American baseball player
- Shaun Whiteside (born 1959), Northern Irish translator
- Sheridan Whiteside, fictional character in the 1939 play The Man Who Came to Dinner and its various adaptations
- Thomas Whiteside (disambiguation), multiple people including:
  - Thomas Whiteside (bishop) (1857–1921), English Roman Catholic bishop
  - Thomas Whiteside (journalist) (1918–1997), American journalist
  - Tom Whiteside (1932–2008), British historian of mathematics
- Walker Whiteside (1869–1942), American actor
- Warren Whiteside (born 1961), Australian cricketer

== See also ==
- Whitesides
