= Whiteside =

Whiteside may refer to:

== Places ==
Australia

- Whiteside, Queensland, suburb in the Moreton Bay Region, Queensland

Canada

- Whiteside, Nova Scotia

United Kingdom

- Whiteside (Lake District), a fell in the west of the English Lake District
- Whiteside, a historic farm in Carrycoats estate in Northumberland
- Whiteside in Thirlwall, Northumberland
- Whiteside in Whalton, Northumberland
- Whiteside, West Lothian, a village on the edge of Bathgate, Scotland

United States

- Whiteside County, Illinois, county in Illinois
- Whiteside, Missouri, village in Lincoln County, Missouri
- Whiteside, Tennessee, unincorporated place in Marion County, Tennessee
- Whiteside Mountain, Jackson County, North Carolina

== Other uses ==
- Whiteside (surname)

== See also ==
- White Side, a fell in the east of the English Lake District
- Whitesides
