= Thomas Whiteside =

Thomas Whiteside may refer to:

- Thomas Whiteside (bishop) (1857–1921), English prelate of the Roman Catholic Church
- Thomas Whiteside (journalist) (1918–1997), American journalist
- Tom Whiteside (1932–2008), historian of mathematics

== See also ==
- Thomas Whitesides (1836–1919), Australian cricketer
