= Whitesides =

Whitesides is an English surname. Notable people with the surname include:

- Dan Whitesides (born 1977), American drummer
- George M. Whitesides (1939–2026), American chemist and academic
- George T. Whitesides, American businessman and Congressman
- Jacob Whitesides (born 1997), American singer-songwriter
- Kevin Whitesides (born 1964), American racing driver
- Loretta Hidalgo Whitesides, American author and public speaker
- Sue Whitesides, Canadian mathematician and computer scientist
- Thomas Whitesides (1836–1919), Australian cricketer
- Thomas Richard Whitesides, Canadian politician
- Tyler Whitesides (born 1987), American writer

== See also ==
- Whiteside Theatre, historic theater building in Corvallis, Oregon, United States
- Winny v. Whitesides
- Whiteside (disambiguation)
