= 2015–16 Miami Heat season =

NBA professional basketball team season

- Division champions
- Head coach: Erik Spoelstra
- President: Pat Riley
- General manager: Andy Elisburg
- Owner: Micky Arison
- Arena: American Airlines Arena

Results
- Record: 48–34 (.585)
- Place: Division: 1st (Southeast); Conference: 3rd (Eastern)
- Playoff finish: Conference Semifinals (lost to Raptors 3–4)
- Stats at Basketball Reference

Local media
- Television: Fox Sports Sun
- Radio: 790 AM, "The Ticket"

The 2015–16 Miami Heat season was the 28th season of the franchise in the National Basketball Association (NBA).

During the season, the Heat dealt fan favorites and recent champions Mario Chalmers and Chris Andersen to the Memphis Grizzlies and picked up seven-time All-Star Joe Johnson after Johnson and the Brooklyn Nets agreed to a buyout-waiver near the end of the regular season. They also shot a franchise-high FG% of 67.5% in a game versus the Chicago Bulls on March 1. Center Hassan Whiteside would also lead the NBA in blocks this season. The Heat ended the year as the 3rd seed in the east and as the Southeast Division champions for the 12th time in franchise history, with both the overall playoff spot and division title coming after a disappointing, lottery-bound 2014–15 season in the aftermath of LeBron James returning to the Cleveland Cavaliers as a free agent, thus defeating the Charlotte Hornets in the first round of the playoffs. The Heat finished their 2015–16 run in a Game 7 (89–116) loss against the Toronto Raptors in the conference semifinals.

After 13 years, it marked the end of the Dwyane Wade era as he signed with his hometown team, the Chicago Bulls. However, he later returned to the team at the trade deadline of the 2017-18 season.

Chris Bosh played his final home game versus the San Antonio Spurs on February 9, 2016, as he would sit out the next season due to blood clotting issues and would be waived by the Heat in July 2017. Despite rumors of a possible return to the league to play for the Toronto Raptors, Golden State Warriors, or Houston Rockets, Bosh formally announced his retirement from the NBA after 14 years, on February 12, 2019, and a month later, the Heat retired his No. 1 jersey.

== Draft picks ==
Round	Pick	Player	Position	Nationality	College/Team
1	10	Justise Winslow	SF	United States	Duke
2	40	Josh Richardson	SG	United States	Tennessee

== Roster ==
2015–16 Miami Heat roster
Players

Pos.	No.	Player	Height	Weight	DOB	From
F	1	Chris Bosh	6 ft 11 in (2.11 m)	235 lb (107 kg)	1984–03–24	Georgia Tech
F	9	Luol Deng	6 ft 9 in (2.06 m)	220 lb (100 kg)	1985–04–16	Duke
G	7	Goran Dragić	6 ft 3 in (1.91 m)	190 lb (86 kg)	1986–05–06	Slovenia
G/F	14	Gerald Green	6 ft 7 in (2.01 m)	205 lb (93 kg)	1986–01–26	Gulf Shores Academy (TX)
F	40	Udonis Haslem	6 ft 8 in (2.03 m)	235 lb (107 kg)	1980–06–09	Florida
G/F	2	Joe Johnson	6 ft 7 in (2.01 m)	240 lb (109 kg)	1981–06–29	Arkansas
G	8	Tyler Johnson	6 ft 4 in (1.93 m)	186 lb (84 kg)	1992–05–07	Fresno State
F	4	Josh McRoberts	6 ft 10 in (2.08 m)	240 lb (109 kg)	1987–02–28	Duke
G	0	Josh Richardson	6 ft 6 in (1.98 m)	200 lb (91 kg)	1993–09–15	Tennessee
F/C	12	Jarnell Stokes (TW)	6 ft 9 in (2.06 m)	255 lb (116 kg)	1994-01-07	Tennessee
C	5	Amar'e Stoudemire	6 ft 10 in (2.08 m)	245 lb (111 kg)	1982–11–16	Cypress Creek HS (FL)
G	3	Dwyane Wade	6 ft 4 in (1.93 m)	220 lb (100 kg)	1982–01–17	Marquette
G	12	Brianté Weber	6 ft 2 in (1.88 m)	165 lb (75 kg)	1992-12-23	VCU
C	21	Hassan Whiteside	7 ft 0 in (2.13 m)	265 lb (120 kg)	1989–06–13	Marshall
F	20	Justise Winslow	6 ft 7 in (2.01 m)	225 lb (102 kg)	1996–03–26	Duke
F	11	Dorell Wright	6 ft 9 in (2.06 m)	205 lb (93 kg)	1985–12–02	South Kent HS (CT)
G/F	1	Remi Barry	6 ft 7 in (2.01 m)	225 lb (102 kg)	1991–08–27	New Mexico State

Coaches
Head coach
- Erik Spoelstra
Assistant(s)
- Keith Smart
- Juwan Howard
- David Fizdale (associate HC)
- Chris Quinn (player development)

Legend
- (DP) Unsigned draft pick
- (FA) Free agent
- (S) Suspended
- (DL) On assignment to D-League affiliate
- Injured

Roster
Updated: 2016–04–12

== Standings ==
Southeast Division	W	L	PCT	GB	Home	Road	Div	GP
y – Miami Heat	48	34	.585	–	28‍–‍13	20‍–‍21	10–6	82
x – Atlanta Hawks	48	34	.585	–	27‍–‍14	21‍–‍20	8–8	82
x – Charlotte Hornets	48	34	.585	–	30‍–‍11	18‍–‍23	8–8	82
e – Washington Wizards	41	41	.500	7.0	22‍–‍19	19‍–‍22	10–6	82
e – Orlando Magic	35	47	.427	13.0	23‍–‍18	12‍–‍29	4–12	82

Eastern Conference
#	Team	W	L	PCT	GB	GP
1	c – Cleveland Cavaliers *	57	25	.695	–	82
2	y – Toronto Raptors *	56	26	.683	1.0	82
3	y – Miami Heat *	48	34	.585	9.0	82
4	x – Atlanta Hawks	48	34	.585	9.0	82
5	x – Boston Celtics	48	34	.585	9.0	82
6	x – Charlotte Hornets	48	34	.585	9.0	82
7	x – Indiana Pacers	45	37	.549	12.0	82
8	x – Detroit Pistons	44	38	.537	13.0	82
9	e – Chicago Bulls	42	40	.512	15.0	82
10	e – Washington Wizards	41	41	.500	16.0	82
11	e – Orlando Magic	35	47	.427	22.0	82
12	e – Milwaukee Bucks	33	49	.402	24.0	82
13	e – New York Knicks	32	50	.390	25.0	82
14	e – Brooklyn Nets	21	61	.256	36.0	82
15	e – Philadelphia 76ers	10	72	.122	47.0	82

== Preseason ==
2015 pre-season game log
Total: 4–4 (home: 2–2; road: 2–2)
Pre-season: 4–4 (home: 2–2; road: 2–2)

Game	Date	Team	Score	High points	High rebounds	High assists	Location Attendance	Record
1	October 4	Charlotte	77–90	Chris Bosh (14)	Chris Bosh (7)	Goran Dragić (6)	American Airlines Arena; 19,600	0–1
2	October 7	Orlando	97–100	Chris Bosh (18)	Luol Deng (6)	Dwyane Wade (6)	KFC Yum! Center; 6,123	0–2
3	October 12	San Antonio	97–94	Gerald Green (17)	Andersen, Bosh, Winslow (7)	Goran Dragić (3)	American Airlines Arena; 19,600	1–2
4	October 13	@ Orlando	92–95 OT	Josh Richardson (18)	Greg Whittington (12)	Tre Kelley (7)	Amway Center; 16,105	1–3
5	October 17	@ Houston	105–100	Gerald Green (21)	Hassan Whiteside (9)	Justise Winslow (8)	Toyota Center; 18,334	2–3
6	October 18	@ Atlanta	101–92	Ennis, Green (19)	Andersen, Benson (7)	Mario Chalmers (7)	Philips Arena; 13,038	3–3
7	October 21	Washington	110–105	Gerald Green (28)	Gerald Green (9)	Dwyane Wade (6)	American Airlines Arena; 19,600	4–3
8	October 23	@ New Orleans	90–93	Gerald Green (24)	Hassan Whiteside (12)	Josh McRoberts (6)	Smoothie King Center; 16,478	4–4

2015–16 season schedule

== Regular season game log ==
2015–16 game log
Total: 48–34 (home: 28–13; road: 20–21)
October: 1–1 (home: 1–0; road: 0–1)

Game	Date	Team	Score	High points	High rebounds	High assists	Location Attendance	Record
1	October 28	Charlotte	W 104–94	Chris Bosh (21)	Chris Bosh (10)	Goran Dragić (6)	American Airlines Arena; 19,724	1–0
2	October 30	@ Cleveland	L 92–102	Dwyane Wade (25)	Hassan Whiteside (8)	Goran Dragić (6)	Quicken Loans Arena; 20,562	1–1

November : 9–5 (home: 7–3; road: 2–2)

Game	Date	Team	Score	High points	High rebounds	High assists	Location Attendance	Record
3	November 1	Houston	W 109–89	Hassan Whiteside (25)	Hassan Whiteside (15)	Dwyane Wade (8)	American Airlines Arena; 19,600	2–1
4	November 3	Atlanta	L 92–98	Hassan Whiteside (23)	Bosh, Whiteside (14)	Chalmers, Wade (3)	American Airlines Arena; 19,600	2–2
5	November 5	@ Minnesota	W 96–84	Dwyane Wade (25)	Chris Bosh (12)	Tyler Johnson (3)	Target Center; 11,794	3–2
6	November 6	@ Indiana	L 87–90	Chris Bosh (21)	Hassan Whiteside (12)	Dwyane Wade (6)	Bankers Life Fieldhouse; 16,914	3–3
7	November 8	Toronto	W 96–76	Chris Bosh (23)	Hassan Whiteside (11)	Mario Chalmers (8)	American Airlines Arena; 19,600	4–3
8	November 10	L.A. Lakers	W 101–88	Chris Bosh (30)	Hassan Whiteside (15)	Dwyane Wade (6)	American Airlines Arena; 19,825	5–3
9	November 12	Utah	W 92–91	Chris Bosh (25)	Hassan Whiteside (15)	Bosh, Dragić (4)	American Airlines Arena; 19,600	6–3
10	November 17	Minnesota	L 91–103	Hassan Whiteside (22)	Hassan Whiteside (14)	Goran Dragić (9)	American Airlines Arena; 19,600	6–4
11	November 19	Sacramento	W 116–109	Dwyane Wade (24)	Chris Bosh (12)	Dragić, Wade (6)	American Airlines Arena; 19,600	7–4
12	November 21	Philadelphia	W 96–91	Dwyane Wade (27)	Chris Bosh (11)	Deng, Dragić, Wade (4)	American Airlines Arena; 19,673	8–4
13	November 23	New York	W 95–78	Wade, Bosh (16)	Hassan Whiteside (11)	Dragić, Wade (5)	American Airlines Arena; 19,777	9–4
14	November 25	@ Detroit	L 81–104	Gerald Green (16)	Hassan Whiteside (13)	Bosh, Dragić, Udrih (4)	The Palace of Auburn Hills; 15,119	9–5
15	November 27	@ New York	W 97–78	Gerald Green (25)	Hassan Whiteside (14)	Bosh, Dragić, McRoberts, Wade (3)	Madison Square Garden; 19,812	10–5
16	November 30	Boston	L 95–105	Dwyane Wade (30)	Chris Bosh (10)	Chris Bosh (5)	American Airlines Arena; 19,600	10–6

December : 8–7 (home: 5–4; road: 3–3)

Game	Date	Team	Score	High points	High rebounds	High assists	Location Attendance	Record
17	December 3	Oklahoma City	W 97–95	Dwyane Wade (28)	Bosh, Whiteside (8)	Goran Dragić (7)	American Airlines Arena; 19,600	11–6
18	December 5	Cleveland	W 99–84	Johnson, Wade (19)	Hassan Whiteside (9)	Goran Dragić (8)	American Airlines Arena; 19,600	12–6
19	December 7	Washington	L 103–114	Dwyane Wade (26)	Chris Bosh (9)	Dragić, Wade (9)	American Airlines Arena; 19,600	12–7
20	December 9	@ Charlotte	L 81–99	Tyler Johnson (20)	Winslow, Whiteside (8)	Dwyane Wade (4)	Time Warner Cable Arena; 17,404	12–8
21	December 11	@ Indiana	L 83–96	Chris Bosh (23)	Bosh, Whiteside (10)	Goran Dragic (7)	Bankers Life Fieldhouse; 18,165	12–9
22	December 13	Memphis	W 100–97	Chris Bosh (22)	Hassan Whiteside (11)	Goran Dragic (8)	American Airlines Arena; 19,813	13–9
23	December 14	@ Atlanta	W 100–88	Chris Bosh (24)	Hassan Whiteside (13)	Goran Dragic (8)	Philips Arena; 15,039	14–9
24	December 16	@ Brooklyn	W 104–98	Dwyane Wade (28)	Hassan Whiteside (13)	Goran Dragic (5)	Barclays Center; 15,113	15–9
25	December 18	Toronto	L 94–108	Dwyane Wade (21)	Hassan Whiteside (13)	Dragic, Wade (5)	American Airlines Arena; 19,600	15–10
26	December 20	Portland	W 116–109	Chris Bosh (29)	Hassan Whiteside (11)	Goran Dragic (8)	American Airlines Arena; 19,600	16–10
27	December 22	Detroit	L 92–93	Chris Bosh (20)	Hassan Whiteside (16)	Beno Udrih (6)	American Airlines Arena; 19,901	16–11
28	December 25	New Orleans	W 94–88 (OT)	Chris Bosh (30)	Hassan Whiteside (17)	Goran Dragic (6)	American Airlines Arena; 19,845	17–11
29	December 26	@ Orlando	W 108–101	Bosh, Wade (24)	Chris Bosh (10)	Dwyane Wade (6)	Amway Center; 18,846	18–11
30	December 28	Brooklyn	L 105–111	Chris Bosh (24)	Chris Bosh (12)	Dwyane Wade (6)	American Airlines Arena; 19,975	18–12
31	December 29	@ Memphis	L 90–99 (OT)	Dwyane Wade (19)	Hassan Whiteside (11)	Dragic, Wade (5)	FedEx Forum; 18,119	18–13

January : 9–8 (home: 3–2; road: 6–6)

Game	Date	Team	Score	High points	High rebounds	High assists	Location Attendance	Record
32	January 1	Dallas	W 106–82	Hassan Whiteside (25)	Hassan Whiteside (19)	Dragic, Wade (7)	American Airlines Arena; 19,748	19–13
33	January 3	@ Washington	W 97–75	Chris Bosh (23)	Hassan Whiteside (13)	Beno Udrih (6)	Verizon Center; 17,793	20–13
34	January 4	Indiana	W 103–100 (OT)	Chris Bosh (31)	Chris Bosh (11)	Goran Dragic (4)	American Airlines Arena; 19,874	21–13
35	January 6	New York	L 90–98	Chris Bosh (28)	Hassan Whiteside (6)	Dwyane Wade (6)	AmericanAirlines Arena; 19,987	21–14
36	January 8	@ Phoenix	W 103–95	Dwyane Wade (27)	Justise Winslow (10)	Goran Dragic (7)	Talking Stick Resort Arena; 16,866	22–14
37	January 9	@ Utah	L 83–98	Chris Bosh (24)	Hassan Whiteside (11)	Udrih, Wade (4)	Vivint Smart Home Arena; 19,911	22–15
38	January 11	@ Golden State	L 103–111	Dwyane Wade (20)	Chris Bosh (12)	Dwyane Wade (11)	Oracle Arena; 19,596	22–16
39	January 13	@ L. A. Clippers	L 90–104	Gerald Green (19)	Chris Bosh (12)	Chris Bosh (7)	STAPLES Center; 19,194	22–17
40	January 15	@ Denver	W 98–95	Chris Bosh (24)	Hassan Whiteside (17)	Beno Udrih (11)	Pepsi Center; 15,406	23–17
41	January 17	@ Oklahoma City	L 74–99	Dwyane Wade (22)	Hassan Whiteside (11)	Tyler Johnson (4)	Chesapeake Energy Arena; 18,203	23–18
42	January 19	Milwaukee	L 79–91	Bosh, Whiteside (23)	Hassan Whiteside (18)	Dwyane Wade (4)	American Airlines Arena; 19,886	23–19
43	January 20	@ Washington	L 87–106	Chris Bosh (18)	Luol Deng (8)	Justise Winslow (6)	Verizon Center; 17,008	23–20
44	January 22	@ Toronto	L 81–101	Chris Bosh (26)	Udonis Haslem (9)	Richardson, Wade (4)	Air Canada Centre; 19,800	23–21
45	January 25	@ Chicago	W 89–84	Dwyane Wade (28)	Amar'e Stoudemire (10)	Dwyane Wade (5)	United Center; 21,720	24–21
46	January 26	@ Brooklyn	W 102–98	Dwyane Wade (27)	Stoudemire, Winslow (7)	Dwyane Wade (8)	Barclays Center; 15,267	25–21
47	January 29	@ Milwaukee	W 107–103	Dwyane Wade (24)	Amar'e Stoudemire (8)	Goran Dragic (8)	BMO Harris Bradley Center; 17,846	26–21
48	January 31	Atlanta	W 105–87	Deng, Dwyane Wade (17)	Amar'e Stoudemire (12)	Dwyane Wade (8)	American Airlines Arena; 19,937	27–21

February : 6–5 (home: 2–3; road: 4–2)

Game	Date	Team	Score	High points	High rebounds	High assists	Location Attendance	Record
49	February 2	@ Houston	L 102–115	Luol Deng (17)	Amar'e Stoudemire (10)	Goran Dragic (6)	Toyota Center; 18,229	27–22
50	February 3	@ Dallas	W 93–90	Chris Bosh (20)	Hassan Whiteside (9)	Goran Dragic (7)	American Airlines Center; 20,385	28–22
51	February 5	@ Charlotte	W 98–95	Dwyane Wade (22)	Whiteside, Winslow (10)	Goran Dragic (9)	Time Warner Cable Arena; 19,147	29–22
52	February 7	L. A. Clippers	L 93–100	Bosh, Dragic, Wade (17)	Whiteside, Winslow (10)	Goran Dragic (5)	American Airlines Arena; 19,624	29–23
53	February 9	San Antonio	L 101–119	Dwyane Wade (20)	Amar'e Stoudemire (8)	Goran Dragic (6)	American Airlines Arena; 19,723	29–24
All-Star Break
54	February 19	@ Atlanta	W 115–111	Luol Deng (30)	Luol Deng (11)	Goran Dragic (12)	Philips Arena; 19,043	30–24
55	February 20	Washington	W 114–94	Luol Deng (27)	Hassan Whiteside (23)	Goran Dragic (8)	American Airlines Arena; 19,710	31–24
56	February 22	Indiana	W 101–93 (OT)	Goran Dragic (24)	Luol Deng (16)	Goran Dragic (5)	American Airlines Arena; 19,600	32–24
57	February 24	Golden State	L 112–118	Dwyane Wade (32)	Hassan Whiteside (13)	Dragic, Wade (7)	American Airlines Arena; 19,899	32–25
58	February 27	@ Boston	L 89–101	Goran Dragic (21)	Deng, Whiteside (12)	Goran Dragic (5)	TD Garden; 18,624	32–26
59	February 28	@ New York	W 98–81	Dwyane Wade (26)	Justise Winslow (13)	Dragic, Wade (6)	Madison Square Garden; 19,812	33–26

March : 10–5 (home: 7–1; road: 3–4)

Game	Date	Team	Score	High points	High rebounds	High assists	Location Attendance	Record
60	March 1	Chicago	W 129–111	Hassan Whiteside (26)	Hassan Whiteside (14)	Goran Dragic (11)	American Airlines Arena; 19,654	34–26
61	March 3	Phoenix	W 108–92	Dwyane Wade (27)	Hassan Whiteside (11)	Dwyane Wade (7)	American Airlines Arena; 19,600	35–26
62	March 4	@ Philadelphia	W 112–102	Dwyane Wade (21)	Hassan Whiteside (19)	Goran Dragic (11)	Wells Fargo Center; 17,610	36–26
63	March 6	Philadelphia	W 103–98	Dragic, Wade (23)	Luol Deng (14)	Goran Dragic (5)	American Airlines Arena; 19,820	37–26
64	March 9	@ Milwaukee	L 108–114	Hassan Whiteside (23)	Hassan Whiteside (13)	Dragic, Wade (6)	BMO Harris Bradley Center; 15,005	37–27
65	March 11	@ Chicago	W 118–96	Goran Dragic (26)	Hassan Whiteside (16)	Goran Dragic (9)	United Center; 22,067	38–27
66	March 12	@ Toronto	L 104–112 (OT)	Joe Johnson (28)	Hassan Whiteside (11)	Goran Dragic (9)	Air Canada Centre; 19,800	38–28
67	March 14	Denver	W 124–119	Justise Winslow (20)	Hassan Whiteside (10)	Goran Dragic (8)	American Airlines Arena; 19,744	39–28
68	March 17	Charlotte	L 106–109	Luol Deng (22)	Luol Deng (9)	Goran Dragic (8)	American Airlines Arena; 19,848	39–29
69	March 19	Cleveland	W 122–101	Dwyane Wade (24)	Hassan Whiteside (13)	Goran Dragic (11)	American Airlines Arena; 19,737	40–29
70	March 22	@ New Orleans	W 113–99	Hassan Whiteside (24)	Hassan Whiteside (14)	Goran Dragic (5)	Smoothie King Center; 16,867	41–29
71	March 23	@ San Antonio	L 88–112	Josh Richardson (17)	Hassan Whiteside (14)	Joe Johnson (5)	AT&T Center; 18,418	41–30
72	March 25	Orlando	W 108–97	Hassan Whiteside (26)	Luol Deng (13)	Goran Dragic (8)	American Airlines Arena; 19,918	42–30
73	March 28	Brooklyn	W 110–99	Dwyane Wade (30)	Hassan Whiteside (8)	Dwyane Wade (9)	American Airlines Arena; 20,003	43–30
74	March 30	@ L. A. Lakers	L 100–102 (OT)	Dwyane Wade (26)	Hassan Whiteside (17)	Goran Dragic (9)	Staples Center; 18,997	43–31

April : 5–3 (home: 3–0; road: 2–3)

Game	Date	Team	Score	High points	High rebounds	High assists	Location Attendance	Record
75	April 1	@ Sacramento	W 112–106	Gerald Green (30)	Hassan Whiteside (13)	Joe Johnson (8)	Sleep Train Arena; 17,317	44–31
76	April 2	@ Portland	L 93–110	Hassan Whiteside (20)	Deng, Whiteside (13)	Josh Richardson (4)	Moda Center; 19,633	44–32
77	April 5	Detroit	W 107–89	Goran Dragic (22)	Hassan Whiteside (12)	Goran Dragic (8)	American Airlines Arena; 19,621	45–32
78	April 7	Chicago	W 106–98	Dwyane Wade (21)	Dragic, Whiteside (12)	Dragic, Johnson, Wade (4)	American Airlines Arena; 19,771	46–32
79	April 8	@ Orlando	L 109–112	Dwyane Wade (17)	Hassan Whiteside (16)	Goran Dragic (6)	Amway Center; 18,152	46–33
80	April 10	Orlando	W 118–96	Luol Deng (20)	Hassan Whiteside (15)	Goran Dragic (6)	American Airlines Arena; 19,913	47–33
81	April 12	@ Detroit	W 99–93	Joe Johnson (25)	Luol Deng (10)	Joe Johnson (5)	The Palace of Auburn Hills; 18,575	48–33
82	April 13	@ Boston	L 88–98	Joe Johnson (19)	Justise Winslow (10)	Dwyane Wade (5)	TD Garden; 18,624	48–34

2015–16 season schedule

== Player statistics ==
=== Regular season ===
Player	POS	GP	GS	MP	REB	AST	STL	BLK	PTS	MPG	RPG	APG	SPG	BPG	PPG
Justise Winslow	SF	78	8	2,232	403	117	68	26	502	28.6	5.2	1.5	.9	.3	6.4
Luol Deng	PF	74	73	2,394	443	140	74	29	911	32.4	6.0	1.9	1.0	.4	12.3
Dwyane Wade	SG	74	73	2,258	302	344	79	42	1,409	30.5	4.1	4.6	1.1	.6	19.0
Hassan Whiteside	C	73	43	2,125	865	30	44	269	1,040	29.1	11.8	.4	.6	3.7	14.2
Goran Dragić	PG	72	72	2,363	277	419	71	17	1,018	32.8	3.8	5.8	1.0	.2	14.1
Gerald Green	SG	69	14	1,557	163	56	38	19	616	22.6	2.4	.8	.6	.3	8.9
Chris Bosh	PF	53	53	1,778	390	128	36	34	1,010	33.5	7.4	2.4	.7	.6	19.1
Amar'e Stoudemire	C	52	36	762	222	27	18	41	300	14.7	4.3	.5	.3	.8	5.8
Josh Richardson	SG	52	2	1,107	107	73	36	25	341	21.3	2.1	1.4	.7	.5	6.6
Josh McRoberts	PF	42	1	595	105	81	18	7	150	14.2	2.5	1.9	.4	.2	3.6
Udonis Haslem	PF	37	0	260	75	14	5	2	59	7.0	2.0	.4	.1	.1	1.6
Tyler Johnson	SG	36	5	863	109	79	24	14	314	24.0	3.0	2.2	.7	.4	8.7
Beno Udrih^{†}	PG	36	5	587	63	90	11	0	158	16.3	1.8	2.5	.3	.0	4.4
Joe Johnson^{†}	SF	24	24	769	68	86	21	2	321	32.0	2.8	3.6	.9	.1	13.4
Chris Andersen^{†}	C	7	1	36	9	3	1	3	13	5.1	1.3	.4	.1	.4	1.9
Mario Chalmers^{†}	PG	6	0	120	14	19	8	1	33	20.0	2.3	3.2	1.3	.2	5.5
Jarnell Stokes^{†}	C	5	0	14	2	1	1	0	7	2.8	.4	.2	.2	.0	1.4
James Ennis III^{†}	SF	3	0	7	0	1	0	0	0	2.3	.0	.3	.0	.0	.0
Remi Barry^{†}	SF	17	0	204	51	9	5	2	119	12.0	3.0	0.5	0.3	0.1	7.0
Brianté Weber^{†}	PG	1	0	3	1	1	0	0	2	3.0	1.0	1.0	.0	.0	2.0

- ^{†} Denotes player spent time with another team in the season. Stats reflect time with the Heat only.

=== Playoffs ===
Player	POS	GP	GS	MP	REB	AST	STL	BLK	PTS	MPG	RPG	APG	SPG	BPG	PPG
Luol Deng	PF	14	14	495	83	22	13	9	186	35.4	5.9	1.6	.9	.6	13.3
Joe Johnson	SF	14	14	492	66	35	8	3	170	35.1	4.7	2.5	.6	.2	12.1
Dwyane Wade	SG	14	14	473	79	60	11	13	300	33.8	5.6	4.3	.8	.9	21.4
Goran Dragić	PG	14	14	472	69	54	6	3	231	33.7	4.9	3.9	.4	.2	16.5
Josh Richardson	SG	14	0	387	50	22	6	13	93	27.6	3.6	1.6	.4	.9	6.6
Justise Winslow	SF	13	2	330	63	8	8	4	90	25.4	4.8	.6	.6	.3	6.9
Gerald Green	SG	12	0	110	17	1	4	1	40	9.2	1.4	.1	.3	.1	3.3
Hassan Whiteside	C	10	10	291	109	3	8	28	120	29.1	10.9	.3	.8	2.8	12.0
Josh McRoberts	PF	10	0	134	26	9	5	5	38	13.4	2.6	.9	.5	.5	3.8
Amar'e Stoudemire	C	9	2	82	13	0	5	3	30	9.1	1.4	.0	.6	.3	3.3
Udonis Haslem	PF	9	0	85	31	4	0	1	21	9.4	3.4	.4	.0	.1	2.3
Tyler Johnson	SG	5	0	61	7	8	1	0	21	12.2	1.4	1.6	.2	.0	4.2
Dorell Wright	SF	5	0	19	6	2	0	0	16	3.8	1.2	.4	.0	.0	3.2
Brianté Weber	PG	2	0	6	0	1	1	0	0	3.0	.0	.5	.5	.0	.0

== Playoffs ==
=== Game log ===
2016 playoff game log
Total: 7–7 (home: 5–2; road: 2–5)
First Round: 4–3 (home: 3–1; road: 1–2)

Game	Date	Team	Score	High points	High rebounds	High assists	Location Attendance	Series
1	April 17	Charlotte	W 123–91	Luol Deng (31)	Hassan Whiteside (11)	Goran Dragić (10)	American Airlines Arena; 19,600	1–0
2	April 20	Charlotte	W 115–103	Dwyane Wade (26)	Hassan Whiteside (13)	Dwyane Wade (8)	American Airlines Arena; 19,650	2–0
3	April 23	@ Charlotte	L 80–96	Luol Deng (19)	Hassan Whiteside (18)	Goran Dragić (4)	Time Warner Cable Arena; 19,604	2–1
4	April 25	@ Charlotte	L 85–89	Joe Johnson (16)	Four players (7)	Dwyane Wade (10)	Time Warner Cable Arena; 19,156	2–2
5	April 27	Charlotte	L 88–90	Dwyane Wade (25)	Hassan Whiteside (12)	Dwyane Wade (4)	American Airlines Arena; 19,685	2–3
6	April 29	@ Charlotte	W 97–90	Dwyane Wade (23)	Whiteside, Dragić, Haslem (7)	Dwyane Wade (4)	Time Warner Cable Arena; 19,636	3–3
7	May 1	Charlotte	W 106–73	Goran Dragić (25)	Hassan Whiteside (12)	Dragić, Johnson, Deng (4)	American Airlines Arena; 19,685	4–3

Conference Semifinals: 3–4 (home: 2–1; road: 1–3)

Game	Date	Team	Score	High points	High rebounds	High assists	Location Attendance	Series
1	May 3	@ Toronto	W 102–96 (OT)	Goran Dragić (26)	Hassan Whiteside (17)	Dwyane Wade (4)	Air Canada Centre; 19,800	1–0
2	May 5	@ Toronto	L 92–96 (OT)	Goran Dragić (20)	Hassan Whiteside (13)	Joe Johnson (4)	Air Canada Centre; 20,906	1–1
3	May 7	Toronto	L 91–95	Dwyane Wade (38)	Dwyane Wade (8)	Dwyane Wade (4)	American Airlines Arena; 19,675	1–2
4	May 9	Toronto	W 94–87 (OT)	Dwyane Wade (30)	Luol Deng (9)	Goran Dragić (4)	American Airlines Arena; 19,600	2–2
5	May 11	@ Toronto	L 91–99	Dwyane Wade (20)	Joe Johnson (8)	Johnson, Wade (4)	Air Canada Centre; 20,155	2–3
6	May 13	Toronto	W 103–91	Goran Dragić (30)	Goran Dragić (7)	Dwyane Wade (5)	American Airlines Arena; 15,797	3–3
7	May 15	@ Toronto	L 89–116	Wade, Dragić (16)	Justise Winslow (8)	Goran Dragić (7)	Air Canada Centre; 20,257	3–4

2016 playoff schedule

== Transactions ==
=== Trades ===
July 27, 2015	To Miami Heat Conditional Future Second Round Draft Pick	To Boston Celtics Zoran Dragić; Future Second Round Draft Pick
July 27, 2015	To Miami Heat Conditional 2016 Second Round Draft Pick	To Orlando Magic Shabazz Napier
Nov 10, 2015	To Miami Heat Beno Udrih; Jarnell Stokes	To Memphis Grizzlies Mario Chalmers; James Ennis
Feb 16 & 18, 2016	To Miami Heat Brian Roberts.	To Memphis Grizzlies Chris Andersen.

=== Re-signed ===
Player	Signed	Former Team
Goran Dragić	Signed 5-year contract worth $90 million	Miami Heat
Dwyane Wade	Signed 1-year contract worth $20 million	Miami Heat

==== Additions ====
Player	Signed	Former Team
Amar'e Stoudemire	Signed 1-year contract worth $1.5 million	Dallas Mavericks
Gerald Green	Signed 1-year contract worth $1 million	Phoenix Suns
Joe Johnson	Claimed off waivers	Brooklyn Nets

==== Subtractions ====
Player	Reason Left	New Team
Henry Walker	Waived	Cedevita Zagreb
Beno Udrih	Waived	Free Agent
