= Irvine Victoria F.C. =

Association football club in North Ayrshire, Scotland

Irvine Victoria
- Full name: Irvine Victoria Football Club
- Nicknames: The Westenders, The Vics
- Founded: 1904
- Ground: Victoria Park, Irvine
- Coordinates: 55°36′56″N 4°40′39″W
- Manager: Ben Carson
- League: West of Scotland League Third Division
- 2025–26: West of Scotland League Fourth Division, 8th of 16 (promoted)
- Website: http://www.irvinevictoriafc.co.uk
Home colours	Away colours

Irvine Victoria Football Club is a Scottish football club, based in the town of Irvine, North Ayrshire. Nicknamed The Vics and "Westenders", it was formed in 1904 and plays at Victoria Park, in Irvine. Club colours are orange, blue and white stripes. Irvine Victoria play in the West of Scotland League Third Division.

The club's local rival is Irvine Meadow XI.

On 24 May 2018 Brian McLuckie became Manager of the club.

On 10 June 2021 Brian McLuckie resigned as Manager of the club.

On 28 June 2021 Irvine Vics announced Dougie MacDuff as their new manager.

== Ground ==
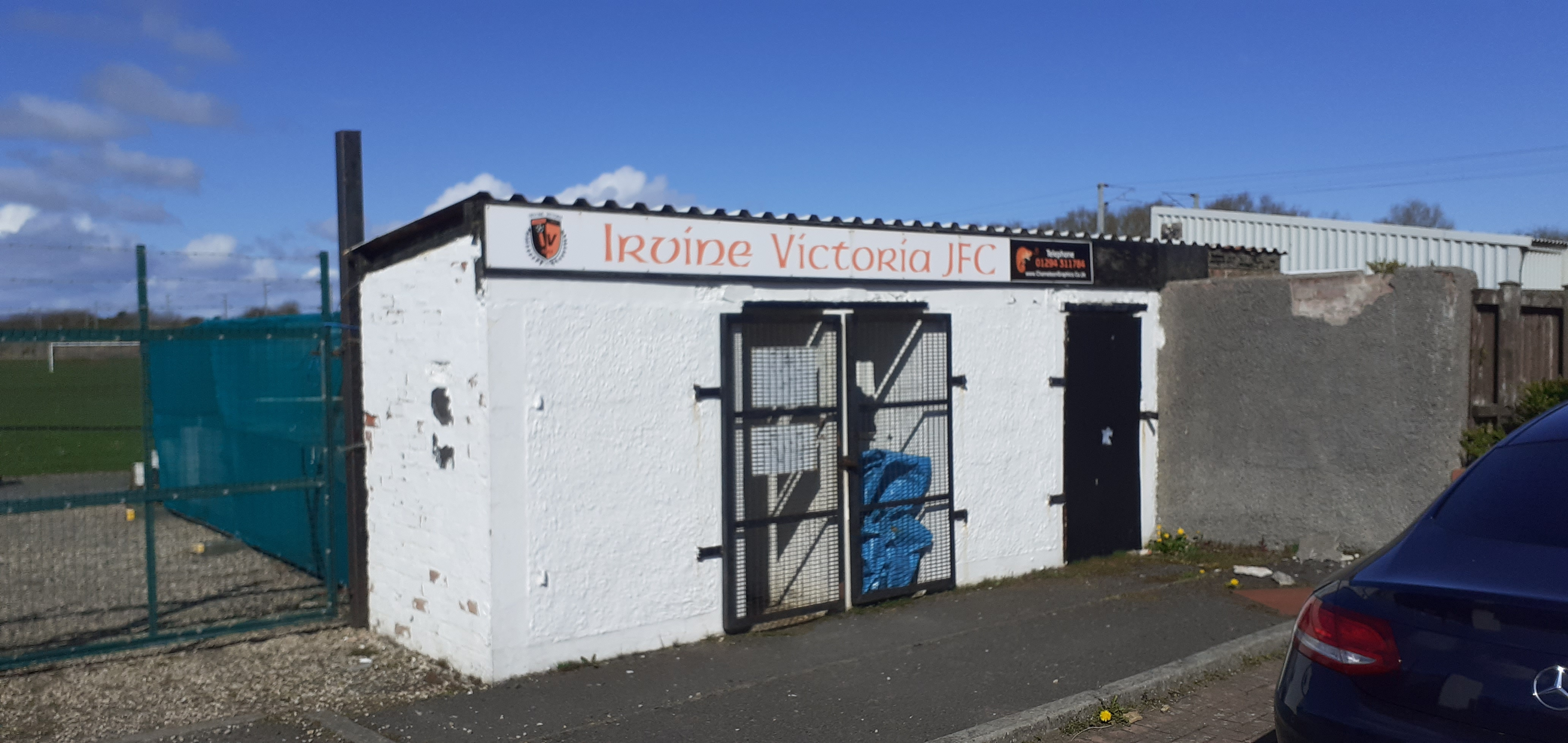
Victoria Park

The club play at Victoria Park. The ground is only 300 yards away from Irvine railway station. It has two covered enclosures and some concrete terracing. Irvine Victoria were formed in 1901 but did not play until New Year's Day 1902, they became a Junior side in 1904. We have played at Cochrane Street since 1937. Prior to this we lived a very nomadic life:- Chrome Park 1902–03, Marress Farm 1903–04, The Riggs on Ayr Road 1904–14, Bank Street 1914–15, Railway Park 1919–26, The Riggs 1926–31, Railway Park 1931-32 and Whinney Park 1932–37.

== Honours won ==
- Ayrshire District League Champions: 2013–14
- Ayrshire (Ardrossan & Saltcoats Herald) Cup: 1952–53
- Ayrshire League (Kerr & Smith) Cup: 1951–52, 1953–54, 1973–74
- Ayrshire District (Irvine Times) Cup: 1934–35
- Ayrshire League Cup: 1973–74
- Cunninghame Cup: 1984–85, 1988–89
- North Ayrshire Cup: 1998–99
- Irvine & District League: 1919–20

== Management team ==
- Managers: Ben Carson
- Assistant Manager: Lee McCrea
- Coach: Nick Coles & David McCaffery

== Committee ==
- Chairman: Vacant
- Vice Chairman: Shaw Donaldson
- Secretary: David Loach
- Treasurer: William Loach
- Minute Secretary: William Loach
- Committee Members: Aimee Loach, David Mill, Declan Davidson

== Past players ==
- (Scotland) Hugh Arkinson (Kilmarnock)
- (Scotland) John Boyd (Greenock Morton, Clydebank & Motherwell)
- (Scotland) Alex Brown (Partick Thistle, Preston North End & Carlisle United)
- (Scotland) George Caldwell (Arbroath)
- (Scotland) Alex Elliot (Cowdenbeath & Airdrie)
- (Scotland) Ian Fraser (Ayr United)
- (Scotland) Billy Fulton (Ayr United, Falkirk & St.Mirren)
- (Scotland) John Hollywood (Queen of the South)
- (Scotland) Iain Jardine (Kilmarnock, Partick Thistle, Anorthosis (Cyprus), Heart of Midlothian
- (Scotland) Charlie Kerr (Greenock Morton, Carlisle United, Portadown & Barrow)
- (Scotland) Ian Kerr (Kilmarnock)
- (Scotland) Bobby Lawrie (Portsmouth)
- (Scotland) Ronnie McCall (Ayr United & Stranraer)
- (Scotland) John McCulloch (Queen of the South)
- (Scotland) Chris McGowan (Albion Rovers)
- (Scotland) Johnny McIlwaine (Falkirk, Portsmouth and Southampton)
- (Scotland) Ron McNeil (Raith Rovers & Weymouth)
- (Scotland) Jim Muir (Motherwell, Dumbarton, Adelaide City & Marconi-Fairfield)
- (Scotland) George O'Donnell (Ayr United & Montrose)
- (Scotland) Gary Russell (Queen of the South & Albion Rovers)
- (Scotland) Joe Wark (Motherwell)
- (Scotland) Kerr Whiteside (Manchester United)
