= 2015–16 NBA season =

70th NBA season

- League: National Basketball Association
- Sport: Basketball
- Duration: October 27, 2015 – April 13, 2016; April 16, 2016 – May 30, 2016 (Playoffs); June 2, 2016 – June 19, 2016 (Finals)
- Games: 82
- Teams: 30
- TV partner(s): ABC, TNT, ESPN, NBA TV

Draft
- Top draft pick: Karl-Anthony Towns
- Picked by: Minnesota Timberwolves

Regular season
- Top seed: Golden State Warriors
- Season MVP: Stephen Curry (Golden State Warriors)
- Top scorer: Stephen Curry (Golden State Warriors)

Playoffs
- Eastern champions: Cleveland Cavaliers
- Eastern runners-up: Toronto Raptors
- Western champions: Golden State Warriors
- Western runners-up: Oklahoma City Thunder

Finals
- Champions: Cleveland Cavaliers
- Runners-up: Golden State Warriors
- Finals MVP: LeBron James (Cleveland)

NBA seasons
- ← 2014–15 2016–17 →

The 2015–16 NBA season was the 70th season of the National Basketball Association (NBA). The regular season began on October 27, 2015, at the United Center, home of the Chicago Bulls, with their game against the Cleveland Cavaliers. The 2016 NBA All-Star Game was played at the Air Canada Centre in Toronto, Ontario, Canada on February 14, 2016. The regular season ended on April 13, 2016. Golden State's Stephen Curry became the first unanimous MVP in league history. The playoffs started on April 16, 2016, and ended with the 2016 NBA Finals on June 19, 2016, with the Cleveland Cavaliers becoming NBA champions for the first time in franchise history after defeating the Golden State Warriors in seven games. This would also be the final season for All-Stars and future Hall of Famers Kobe Bryant, Tim Duncan and Kevin Garnett. This would feature the last game 7 in the finals until 2025.

== Transactions ==
=== Retirement ===
- On June 18, 2015, Shawn Marion officially announced his retirement after playing 16 seasons, winning an NBA championship with the Dallas Mavericks in 2011.
- On June 23, 2015, Andrei Kirilenko officially announced his retirement after playing 13 seasons in the NBA.
- On July 2, 2015, Kenyon Martin officially announced his retirement after playing 15 seasons in the NBA.
- On July 22, 2015, Stephen Jackson officially announced his retirement after playing 14 seasons, winning an NBA championship with the San Antonio Spurs in 2003.
- On August 11, 2015, Elton Brand officially announced his retirement after playing 16 seasons in the NBA. On January 4, 2016, he returned to play for Philadelphia 76ers.
- On August 12, 2015, Mengke Bateer officially announced his retirement from professional basketball. Bateer played for three NBA teams during his 17-year playing career, winning an NBA championship with the San Antonio Spurs in 2003.
- On September 23, 2015, Jason Richardson officially announced his retirement after playing 14 seasons in the NBA.
- On November 13, 2015, Hedo Türkoğlu officially announced his retirement after playing 15 seasons in the NBA.
- On November 29, 2015, Kobe Bryant officially announced that the 2015–16 season would be his last after playing 20 seasons, winning five NBA championships with the Los Angeles Lakers. Bryant ended his career with a season-high 60 points in his final career game against the Utah Jazz.

=== Free agency ===
Free agency negotiations began on July 1, 2015, while players would begin to sign starting on July 7, after the July moratorium ended.

=== Coaching changes ===
Coaching changes
Off-season
Team	2014–15 season	2015–16 season
Oklahoma City Thunder	Scott Brooks	Billy Donovan
New Orleans Pelicans	Monty Williams	Alvin Gentry
Chicago Bulls	Tom Thibodeau	Fred Hoiberg
Orlando Magic	James Borrego (interim)	Scott Skiles
Denver Nuggets	Melvin Hunt (interim)	Michael Malone
Minnesota Timberwolves	Flip Saunders (died)	Sam Mitchell
In-season
Team	Outgoing coach	Incoming coach
Houston Rockets	Kevin McHale	J. B. Bickerstaff (interim)
Brooklyn Nets	Lionel Hollins	Tony Brown (interim)
Cleveland Cavaliers	David Blatt	Tyronn Lue
Phoenix Suns	Jeff Hornacek	Earl Watson
New York Knicks	Derek Fisher	Kurt Rambis (interim)

==== Off-season ====
- On April 22, 2015, the Oklahoma City Thunder fired head coach Scott Brooks after seven years with the team.
- On April 30, 2015, the Oklahoma City Thunder hired Billy Donovan as head coach.
- On May 12, 2015, the New Orleans Pelicans fired head coach Monty Williams after five years with the team.
- On May 28, 2015, the Chicago Bulls fired head coach Tom Thibodeau after five years with the team.
- On May 29, 2015, the Orlando Magic hired Scott Skiles as head coach.
- On May 30, 2015, the New Orleans Pelicans hired Alvin Gentry as head coach.
- On June 2, 2015, the Chicago Bulls hired Fred Hoiberg as head coach.
- On June 15, 2015, the Denver Nuggets hired Michael Malone as head coach.
- On September 10, 2015, the Minnesota Timberwolves announced that assistant coach Sam Mitchell would take on the interim head coach role while Flip Saunders battled Hodgkin's lymphoma. Saunders died on October 25, thus making Mitchell the new, full-term head coach for the season afterwards.
- On October 1, 2015, the Golden State Warriors announced that assistant coach Luke Walton would take on the interim head coach role while Steve Kerr recovers from back pain issues that he had throughout the summer.

==== In-season ====
- On November 18, 2015, the Houston Rockets fired head coach Kevin McHale after five years with the team. Their assistant coach J. B. Bickerstaff would take on the interim head coach.
- On December 23, 2015, the Milwaukee Bucks announced that assistant coach Joe Prunty would take on the interim head coach role while Jason Kidd recovers after taking an indefinite leave to have hip surgery.
- On January 10, 2016, the Brooklyn Nets fired head coach Lionel Hollins after two years with the team. Assistant coach Tony Brown was named as interim head coach.
- On January 22, 2016, Golden State Warriors coach Steve Kerr returned after complications following back surgery, taking over from Luke Walton, who led the Warriors to a 39–4 record. Walton returns as an assistant coach for Kerr.
- On January 22, 2016, the Cleveland Cavaliers fired head coach David Blatt after one-and-a-half seasons with the team. Assistant coach Tyronn Lue was named the new head coach after signing a three-year deal with the Cavaliers.
- On January 26, 2016, Milwaukee Bucks coach Jason Kidd returned after complications following right hip surgery taking over from Joe Prunty who led the Bucks to an 8–9 record.
- On February 1, 2016, the Phoenix Suns fired head coach Jeff Hornacek after two and a half seasons with the team. Suns' assistant coach Earl Watson was named as interim head coach. On April 19, the Suns decided to promote Watson as their full-time coach for the next three years.
- On February 8, 2016, the New York Knicks fired head coach Derek Fisher after one-and-a-half seasons with the team. Knicks assistant coach Kurt Rambis was named interim head coach for the rest of the season.

== Preseason ==
The preseason began on October 2, 2015, and ended on October 23, 2015.

== Regular season ==
The regular season began on October 27, 2015, at the United Center, home of the Chicago Bulls, who hosted a game against the Cleveland Cavaliers at 8:00 p.m. EDT, then the Atlanta Hawks hosted the Detroit Pistons at 8:00 p.m. EDT. Finally, the defending NBA champion Golden State Warriors hosted the New Orleans Pelicans at 10:30 p.m. EDT at the Oracle Arena. Christmas Day games were played on December 25, 2015. The regular season ended on April 13, 2016. The schedule was released at 6:00 p.m. EDT on August 12, 2015.

=== Standings ===
==== By division ====
Eastern Conference

Atlantic Division	W	L	PCT	GB	Home	Road	Div	GP
y – Toronto Raptors	56	26	.683	–	32‍–‍9	24‍–‍17	14–2	82
x – Boston Celtics	48	34	.585	8.0	28‍–‍13	20‍–‍21	10–6	82
e – New York Knicks	32	50	.390	24.0	18‍–‍23	14‍–‍27	8–8	82
e – Brooklyn Nets	21	61	.256	35.0	14‍–‍27	7‍–‍34	6–10	82
e – Philadelphia 76ers	10	72	.122	46.0	7‍–‍34	3‍–‍38	2–14	82

Central Division	W	L	PCT	GB	Home	Road	Div	GP
c – Cleveland Cavaliers	57	25	.695	–	33‍–‍8	24‍–‍17	8–8	82
x – Indiana Pacers	45	37	.549	12.0	26‍–‍15	19‍–‍22	8–8	82
x – Detroit Pistons	44	38	.537	13.0	26‍–‍15	18‍–‍23	10–6	82
e – Chicago Bulls	42	40	.512	15.0	26‍–‍15	16‍–‍25	10–6	82
e – Milwaukee Bucks	33	49	.402	24.0	23‍–‍18	10‍–‍31	4–12	82

Southeast Division	W	L	PCT	GB	Home	Road	Div	GP
y – Miami Heat	48	34	.585	–	28‍–‍13	20‍–‍21	10–6	82
x – Atlanta Hawks	48	34	.585	–	27‍–‍14	21‍–‍20	8–8	82
x – Charlotte Hornets	48	34	.585	–	30‍–‍11	18‍–‍23	8–8	82
e – Washington Wizards	41	41	.500	7.0	22‍–‍19	19‍–‍22	10–6	82
e – Orlando Magic	35	47	.427	13.0	23‍–‍18	12‍–‍29	4–12	82

Western Conference

Northwest Division	W	L	PCT	GB	Home	Road	Div	GP
y – Oklahoma City Thunder	55	27	.671	–	32‍–‍9	23‍–‍18	13–3	82
x – Portland Trail Blazers	44	38	.537	11.0	28‍–‍13	16‍–‍25	11–5	82
e – Utah Jazz	40	42	.488	15.0	24‍–‍17	16‍–‍25	8–8	82
e – Denver Nuggets	33	49	.402	22.0	18‍–‍23	15‍–‍26	4–12	82
e – Minnesota Timberwolves	29	53	.354	26.0	14‍–‍27	15‍–‍26	4–12	82

Pacific Division	W	L	PCT	GB	Home	Road	Div	GP
z – Golden State Warriors	73	9	.890	–	39‍–‍2	34‍–‍7	15–1	82
x – Los Angeles Clippers	53	29	.646	20.0	29‍–‍12	24‍–‍17	9–7	82
e – Sacramento Kings	33	49	.402	40.0	18‍–‍23	15‍–‍26	8–8	82
e – Phoenix Suns	23	59	.280	50.0	14‍–‍27	9‍–‍32	6–10	82
e – Los Angeles Lakers	17	65	.207	56.0	12‍–‍29	5‍–‍36	2–14	82

Southwest Division	W	L	PCT	GB	Home	Road	Div	GP
y – San Antonio Spurs	67	15	.817	–	40‍–‍1	27‍–‍14	15–1	82
x – Dallas Mavericks	42	40	.512	25.0	23‍–‍18	19‍–‍22	7–9	82
x – Memphis Grizzlies	42	40	.512	25.0	26‍–‍15	16‍–‍25	7–9	82
x – Houston Rockets	41	41	.500	26.0	23‍–‍18	18‍–‍23	8–8	82
e – New Orleans Pelicans	30	52	.366	37.0	21‍–‍20	9‍–‍32	4–12	82

==== By conference ====
Eastern Conference
#	Team	W	L	PCT	GB	GP
1	c – Cleveland Cavaliers *	57	25	.695	–	82
2	y – Toronto Raptors *	56	26	.683	1.0	82
3	y – Miami Heat *	48	34	.585	9.0	82
4	x – Atlanta Hawks	48	34	.585	9.0	82
5	x – Boston Celtics	48	34	.585	9.0	82
6	x – Charlotte Hornets	48	34	.585	9.0	82
7	x – Indiana Pacers	45	37	.549	12.0	82
8	x – Detroit Pistons	44	38	.537	13.0	82
9	e – Chicago Bulls	42	40	.512	15.0	82
10	e – Washington Wizards	41	41	.500	16.0	82
11	e – Orlando Magic	35	47	.427	22.0	82
12	e – Milwaukee Bucks	33	49	.402	24.0	82
13	e – New York Knicks	32	50	.390	25.0	82
14	e – Brooklyn Nets	21	61	.256	36.0	82
15	e – Philadelphia 76ers	10	72	.122	47.0	82

Western Conference
#	Team	W	L	PCT	GB	GP
1	z – Golden State Warriors *	73	9	.890	–	82
2	y – San Antonio Spurs *	67	15	.817	6.0	82
3	y – Oklahoma City Thunder *	55	27	.671	18.0	82
4	x – Los Angeles Clippers	53	29	.646	20.0	82
5	x – Portland Trail Blazers	44	38	.537	29.0	82
6	x – Dallas Mavericks	42	40	.512	31.0	82
7	x – Memphis Grizzlies	42	40	.512	31.0	82
8	x – Houston Rockets	41	41	.500	32.0	82
9	e – Utah Jazz	40	42	.488	33.0	82
10	e – Sacramento Kings	33	49	.402	40.0	82
11	e – Denver Nuggets	33	49	.402	40.0	82
12	e – New Orleans Pelicans	30	52	.366	43.0	82
13	e – Minnesota Timberwolves	29	53	.354	44.0	82
14	e – Phoenix Suns	23	59	.280	50.0	82
15	e – Los Angeles Lakers	17	65	.207	56.0	82

Notes

- z – Clinched home-court advantage for the entire playoffs
- c – Clinched home-court advantage for the conference playoffs
- y – Clinched division title
- x – Clinched playoff spot
- * – Division leader
- e – Eliminated from playoff contention

==== Tiebreakers ====
Eastern Conference

- Miami won the Southeast Division over Atlanta and Charlotte, by having the best record of the three teams in games against each other (5–3 record vs. ATL & CHA).
- By winning its division, Miami automatically won the tie-breaker against Boston.
- Atlanta, Boston and Charlotte were seeded based on record in games against each other (ATL: 6–2 | BOS: 3–4 | CHA: 2–5).

Western Conference

- Dallas clinched #6 seed over Memphis based on head-to-head record (3–1).
- Sacramento finished ahead of Denver based on head-to-head record (3–0).

== Playoffs ==
The 2016 NBA playoffs began on April 16, 2016, and ended with the 2016 NBA Finals which began on June 2, 2016, and ended on June 19, 2016, on ABC. ESPN broadcast the Eastern Conference Finals and TNT broadcast the Western Conference Finals. ABC broadcast the NBA Finals.

=== Bracket ===
First Round	Conference Semifinals
E1	Cleveland*	4
E8	Detroit	0
E1	Cleveland*	4
E4	Atlanta	0
E4	Atlanta	4
E5	Boston	2
Eastern Conference
E3	Miami*	4
E6	Charlotte	3
E3	Miami*	3
E2	Toronto*	4
E2	Toronto*	4
E7	Indiana	3
W1	Golden State*	4
W8	Houston	1
W1	Golden State*	4
W5	Portland	1
W4	LA Clippers	2
W5	Portland	4
Western Conference
W3	Oklahoma City*	4
W6	Dallas	1
W3	Oklahoma City*	4
W2	San Antonio*	2
W2	San Antonio*	4
W7	Memphis	0

Conference Finals
E1	Cleveland*	4
E2	Toronto*	2
W1	Golden State*	4
W3	Oklahoma City*	3

NBA Finals
E1	Cleveland*	4
W1	Golden State*	3

- * Division winner
- Bold Series winner
- Italics Team with home-court advantage

== Statistics ==
=== Individual statistic leaders ===
Category	Player	Team	Statistics
Points per game	Stephen Curry	Golden State Warriors	30.1
Rebounds per game	Andre Drummond	Detroit Pistons	14.8
Assists per game	Rajon Rondo	Sacramento Kings	11.7
Steals per game	Stephen Curry	Golden State Warriors	2.14
Blocks per game	Hassan Whiteside	Miami Heat	3.68
Turnovers per game	James Harden	Houston Rockets	4.6
Fouls per game	DeMarcus Cousins	Sacramento Kings	3.6
Minutes per game	James Harden	Houston Rockets	38.1
FG%	DeAndre Jordan	Los Angeles Clippers	70.3%
FT%	Stephen Curry	Golden State Warriors	90.8%
3FG%	JJ Redick	Los Angeles Clippers	47.5%
Efficiency per game	Stephen Curry	Golden State Warriors	31.56
Double-doubles	Andre Drummond	Detroit Pistons	66
Triple-doubles	Russell Westbrook	Oklahoma City Thunder	18

=== Individual game highs ===
Category	Player	Team	Statistics
Points	Kobe Bryant	Los Angeles Lakers	60
Rebounds	Andre Drummond	Detroit Pistons	29
Assists	Rajon Rondo	Sacramento Kings	20
Steals	Robert Covington	Philadelphia 76ers	8
Steals	Ricky Rubio	Minnesota Timberwolves	8
Steals	Pablo Prigioni	Los Angeles Clippers	8
Steals	James Harden	Houston Rockets	8
Blocks	Hassan Whiteside	Miami Heat	11
Three Pointers	Stephen Curry	Golden State Warriors	12

=== Team statistic leaders ===
Category	Team	Statistics
Points per game	Golden State Warriors	114.9
Rebounds per game	Oklahoma City Thunder	48.6
Assists per game	Golden State Warriors	28.9
Steals per game	Houston Rockets	10.0
Blocks per game	Miami Heat	6.5
Turnovers per game	Phoenix Suns	16.6
FG%	Golden State Warriors	48.7%
FT%	New York Knicks	80.5%
3FG%	Golden State Warriors	41.6%
+/−	Golden State Warriors	10.8

== Awards ==
=== Yearly Awards ===
- Most Valuable Player: Stephen Curry, Golden State Warriors
- Defensive Player of the Year: Kawhi Leonard, San Antonio Spurs
- Rookie of the Year: Karl-Anthony Towns, Minnesota Timberwolves
- Sixth Man of the Year: Jamal Crawford, Los Angeles Clippers
- Most Improved Player: CJ McCollum, Portland Trail Blazers
- Coach of the Year: Steve Kerr, Golden State Warriors
- Executive of the Year: R. C. Buford, San Antonio Spurs
- Sportsmanship Award: Mike Conley Jr., Memphis Grizzlies
- J. Walter Kennedy Citizenship Award: Wayne Ellington, Brooklyn Nets
- Twyman–Stokes Teammate of the Year Award: Vince Carter, Memphis Grizzlies

- All-NBA First Team:
  - F Kawhi Leonard, San Antonio Spurs
  - F LeBron James, Cleveland Cavaliers
  - C DeAndre Jordan, Los Angeles Clippers
  - G Russell Westbrook, Oklahoma City Thunder
  - G Stephen Curry, Golden State Warriors
- All-NBA Second Team:
  - F Kevin Durant, Oklahoma City Thunder
  - F Draymond Green, Golden State Warriors
  - C DeMarcus Cousins, Sacramento Kings
  - G Chris Paul, Los Angeles Clippers
  - G Damian Lillard, Portland Trail Blazers
- All-NBA Third Team:
  - F Paul George, Indiana Pacers
  - F LaMarcus Aldridge, San Antonio Spurs
  - C Andre Drummond, Detroit Pistons
  - G Kyle Lowry, Toronto Raptors
  - G Klay Thompson, Golden State Warriors

- NBA All-Defensive First Team:
  - F Kawhi Leonard, San Antonio Spurs
  - F Draymond Green, Golden State Warriors
  - C DeAndre Jordan, Los Angeles Clippers
  - G Avery Bradley, Boston Celtics
  - G Chris Paul, Los Angeles Clippers
- NBA All-Defensive Second Team:
  - F Paul Millsap, Atlanta Hawks
  - F Paul George, Indiana Pacers
  - C Hassan Whiteside, Miami Heat
  - G Tony Allen, Memphis Grizzlies
  - G Jimmy Butler, Chicago Bulls

- NBA All-Rookie First Team:
  - Karl-Anthony Towns, Minnesota Timberwolves
  - Kristaps Porziņģis, New York Knicks
  - Devin Booker, Phoenix Suns
  - Nikola Jokić, Denver Nuggets
  - Jahlil Okafor, Philadelphia 76ers
- NBA All-Rookie Second Team:
  - Justise Winslow, Miami Heat
  - D'Angelo Russell, Los Angeles Lakers
  - Emmanuel Mudiay, Denver Nuggets
  - Myles Turner, Indiana Pacers
  - Willie Cauley-Stein, Sacramento Kings

=== Players of the Week ===
The following players were named the Eastern and Western Conference Players of the Week.

Week	Eastern Conference	Western Conference	Ref.
Oct. 27 – Nov. 1	Andre Drummond (Detroit Pistons) (1/2)	Stephen Curry (Golden State Warriors) (1/5)	
Nov. 2–8	Andre Drummond (Detroit Pistons) (2/2)	James Harden (Houston Rockets) (1/1)	
Nov. 9–15	Nicolas Batum (Charlotte Hornets) (1/1)	DeMarcus Cousins (Sacramento Kings) (1/2)	
Nov. 16–22	LeBron James (Cleveland Cavaliers) (1/5)	Stephen Curry (Golden State Warriors) (2/5)	
Nov. 23–29	Paul George (Indiana Pacers) (1/1)	Kevin Durant (Oklahoma City Thunder) (1/5)	
Nov. 30 – Dec. 6	Reggie Jackson (Detroit Pistons) (1/2)	Stephen Curry (Golden State Warriors) (3/5)	
Dec. 7–13	DeMar DeRozan (Toronto Raptors) (1/1)	Kevin Durant (Oklahoma City Thunder) (2/5)	
Dec. 14–20	Reggie Jackson (Detroit Pistons) (2/2)	Kawhi Leonard (San Antonio Spurs) (1/2)	
Dec. 21–27	Marcin Gortat (Washington Wizards) (1/1)	Russell Westbrook (Oklahoma City Thunder) (1/1)	
Dec. 28 – Jan. 3	Brook Lopez (Brooklyn Nets) (1/1)	Draymond Green (Golden State Warriors) (1/1)	
Jan. 4–10	LeBron James (Cleveland Cavaliers) (2/5)	Chris Paul (Los Angeles Clippers) (1/1)	
Jan. 11–17	John Wall (Washington Wizards) (1/1)	Kevin Durant (Oklahoma City Thunder) (3/5)	
Jan. 18–24	Kemba Walker (Charlotte Hornets) (1/2)	DeMarcus Cousins (Sacramento Kings) (2/2)	
Jan. 25–31	Dwyane Wade (Miami Heat) (1/1)	Kevin Durant (Oklahoma City Thunder) (4/5)	
Feb. 1–7	Isaiah Thomas (Boston Celtics) (1/1)	LaMarcus Aldridge (San Antonio Spurs) (1/1)	
Feb. 22–28	Kyle Lowry (Toronto Raptors) (1/2)	Stephen Curry (Golden State Warriors) (4/5)	
Feb. 29 – Mar. 6	LeBron James (Cleveland Cavaliers) (3/5)	Kawhi Leonard (San Antonio Spurs) (2/2)	
Mar. 7–13	Kemba Walker (Charlotte Hornets) (2/2)	Stephen Curry (Golden State Warriors) (5/5)	
Mar. 14–20	Kyle Lowry (Toronto Raptors) (2/2)	Kevin Durant (Oklahoma City Thunder) (5/5)	
Mar. 21–27	LeBron James (Cleveland Cavaliers) (4/5)	Klay Thompson (Golden State Warriors) (1/1)	
Mar. 28 – Apr. 3	LeBron James (Cleveland Cavaliers) (5/5)	José Juan Barea (Dallas Mavericks) (1/1)	
Apr. 4–10	Paul Millsap (Atlanta Hawks) (1/1)	Karl-Anthony Towns (Minnesota Timberwolves) (1/1)	

=== Players of the Month ===
The following players were named the Eastern and Western Conference Players of the Month.

Month	Eastern Conference	Western Conference	Ref.
October/November	Paul George (Indiana Pacers) (1/1)	Stephen Curry (Golden State Warriors) (1/2)	
December	John Wall (Washington Wizards) (1/1)	Kevin Durant (Oklahoma City Thunder) (1/2); Russell Westbrook (Oklahoma City Thunder) (1/2)	
January	Kyle Lowry (Toronto Raptors) (1/1); DeMar DeRozan (Toronto Raptors) (1/1)	Kevin Durant (Oklahoma City Thunder) (2/2)	
February	LeBron James (Cleveland Cavaliers) (1/3)	Stephen Curry (Golden State Warriors) (2/2)	
March	LeBron James (Cleveland Cavaliers) (2/3)	Russell Westbrook (Oklahoma City Thunder) (2/2)	
April	LeBron James (Cleveland Cavaliers) (3/3)	James Harden (Houston Rockets) (1/1)	

=== Rookies of the Month ===
The following players were named the Eastern and Western Conference Rookies of the Month.

Month	Eastern Conference	Western Conference	Ref.
October/November	Kristaps Porziņģis (New York Knicks) (1/3)	Karl-Anthony Towns (Minnesota Timberwolves) (1/6)	
December	Kristaps Porziņģis (New York Knicks) (2/3)	Karl-Anthony Towns (Minnesota Timberwolves) (2/6)	
January	Kristaps Porziņģis (New York Knicks) (3/3)	Karl-Anthony Towns (Minnesota Timberwolves) (3/6)	
February	Myles Turner (Indiana Pacers) (1/1)	Karl-Anthony Towns (Minnesota Timberwolves) (4/6)	
March	Josh Richardson (Miami Heat) (1/1)	Karl-Anthony Towns (Minnesota Timberwolves) (5/6)	
April	Norman Powell (Toronto Raptors) (1/1)	Karl-Anthony Towns (Minnesota Timberwolves) (6/6)	

=== Coaches of the Month ===
The following coaches were named the Eastern and Western Conference Coaches of the Month.

Month	Eastern Conference	Western Conference	Ref.
October/November	David Blatt (Cleveland Cavaliers) (1/1)	Luke Walton (Golden State Warriors) (1/1)	
December	Scott Skiles (Orlando Magic) (1/1)	Gregg Popovich (San Antonio Spurs) (1/1)	
January	Dwane Casey (Toronto Raptors) (1/1)	Doc Rivers (Los Angeles Clippers) (1/2)	
February	Brad Stevens (Boston Celtics) (1/1)	Terry Stotts (Portland Trail Blazers) (1/1)	
March	Steve Clifford (Charlotte Hornets) (1/1)	Steve Kerr (Golden State Warriors) (1/1)	
April	Nate McMillan (Indiana Pacers) (1/1)	Doc Rivers (Los Angeles Clippers) (2/2)	

== Arenas ==
- This season was the Sacramento Kings' final season at Sleep Train Arena before moving into the new Golden 1 Center in downtown Sacramento. The Kings played their final regular-season game there on April 9, 2016, against the Oklahoma City Thunder.
- On October 26, Utah Jazz owner group Larry Miller Sports & Entertainment (now Miller Sports + Entertainment) announced a new 10-year naming rights deal for the team's arena with home security provider Vivint, renaming the arena to Vivint Smart Home Arena.
- The Philadelphia 76ers began to refer to their home arena, the Wells Fargo Center, solely as "The Center" in team correspondence, due to Wells Fargo not being a corporate partner in the team. The team's redesigned floor at first de-emphasized the sponsor of the team's arena, with the text of the Wells Fargo Center logo rendered in white that blended in with the floor in a minimal font. However, television and radio broadcasts still use the full arena name. Eventually the logo text was restored to a normal-sized black font by the start of January after input from arena owner Comcast Spectacor, with the 76ers signing a non-signage "official bank" deal with Firstrust Bank.
- The Phoenix Suns' home arena US Airways Center was renamed to Talking Stick Resort Arena.

== Uniforms ==
- On June 6, 2015, the Milwaukee Bucks unveiled new uniforms.
- On June 18, 2015, the Los Angeles Clippers unveiled new uniforms.
- On June 18, 2015, the Philadelphia 76ers unveiled new uniforms.
- On June 24, 2015, the Atlanta Hawks unveiled new uniforms.
- On August 3, 2015, the Toronto Raptors unveiled new uniforms.

== On-court sponsors ==
The following teams placed on-court advertisements for this season:

- Atlanta Hawks – FanDuel
- Boston Celtics – Putnam Investments
- Brooklyn Nets – FanDuel
- Charlotte Hornets – Novant Health
- Cleveland Cavaliers – FanDuel
- Dallas Mavericks – FanDuel
- Denver Nuggets – UCHealth (since January 10, 2016)
- Houston Rockets – ZTE Axon Inc.
- Indiana Pacers – Indiana Economic Development Corporation (AStateThatWorks.com)
- Los Angeles Clippers – American Airlines
- Los Angeles Lakers – FanDuel
- Miami Heat – FanDuel
- Minnesota Timberwolves – U.S. Bank
- New Orleans Pelicans – Ochsner Health System
- New York Knicks – DraftKings
- Orlando Magic – FanDuel
- Phoenix Suns – Annexus
- San Antonio Spurs – FanDuel (since December 21, 2015)
- Toronto Raptors – Bank of Montreal
- Utah Jazz – United Fuel Supply
- Washington Wizards – GEICO

== Media ==
This was the eighth and final year of the television contracts with ABC, ESPN, TNT and NBA TV before the new nine-year contracts began in 2016.

ABC announced that they would be adding games on Saturday nights followed by NBA Sunday Showcase as well as continuing their games on Sunday afternoons. The first Saturday night game was on January 23, 2016, with the Cleveland Cavaliers hosting the Chicago Bulls.

== Notable occurrences ==
- The NBA confirmed that beginning this season, the format for allowing teams to enter the playoffs would change to allow the best eight teams in the Western and Eastern Conferences to enter based on records alone, regardless of who wins their divisions in their conferences. As a result, the tiebreaker stages were adjusted to accommodate those changes as well. Ironically, in 2015–16, the top three teams from both conferences wound up winning their top respective seeds and won their respective divisions for the first year that this new rule took effect.
- For the first time in franchise history, the Minnesota Timberwolves entered an NBA draft with the first overall draft pick. The Timberwolves selected Karl-Anthony Towns. The team also had three straight #1 draft selections on the same team, with Towns joining both Anthony Bennett and Andrew Wiggins at one point. However, Bennett agreed to a buyout with the Timberwolves before the season began, on September 23, 2015.
- The Houston Rockets became the first team in league history to start off a season with three straight losses of at least 20 points each.
- On November 1, 2015, the San Antonio Spurs' trio (Tim Duncan, Tony Parker and Manu Ginóbili) achieved their 541st regular season win, surpassing the all-time mark attained by Larry Bird, Robert Parish and Kevin McHale with the Boston Celtics between 1981 and 1992. Coincidentally, the Spurs' trio milestone was accomplished in a game against the Celtics played at the TD Garden.
- On November 2, 2015, LeBron James surpassed Kobe Bryant to become the youngest player to score 30,000 career points at 30 years, 307 days during the fourth quarter in a road victory against the Philadelphia 76ers. He also became the 20th player in league history to reach the 25,000 point milestone.
- On November 2, 2015, Tim Duncan achieved his 954th victory with the San Antonio Spurs in a 94-84 win against the New York Knicks at Madison Square Garden, thus becoming the player with the most wins with a single team.
- On November 7, 2015, Tim Duncan played in his 1,336th career game, moving him into 10th place on the all-time career games played list, surpassing Gary Payton.
- On November 11, 2015, Tim Duncan moved to 69th on the all-time career rebounding list, surpassing Boston Celtics member Robert Parish.
- On November 14, 2015, Tim Duncan moved to 5th on the all-time career blocks list, surpassing former teammate and Hall of Famer David Robinson. Coincidentally, his teammate Tony Parker also became the 34th player to hit the 6,000 career assist mark.
- On November 15, 2015, Kevin Garnett became the fifth player in league history to play over 50,000 minutes throughout his tenure. He also surpassed Elvin Hayes as the fourth-most played player in league history. He would achieve that mark by playing 23 minutes in a loss to the Memphis Grizzlies.
- On November 17, 2015, LeBron James surpassed Jerry West during the first quarter of a loss to the Detroit Pistons as the league's fourth-highest scorer of all time.
- On November 21, 2015, Dwyane Wade surpassed both Dale Ellis and Reggie Theus to become the league's 49th-highest scorer of all time. He overtook Ellis's spot by making a free throw late in the second quarter in a home victory over the Philadelphia 76ers, and later surpassed Theus's spot by making two free throws in the middle of the fourth quarter in the same game.
- On November 23, 2015, LeBron James moved to 25th on the all-time career assists list, joining Oscar Robertson as the only players in NBA history to be in the top 25 in both career points and assists.
- On November 24, 2015, the Golden State Warriors set the NBA record for the longest winning streak to start out the regular season with a 16–0 record following a win against the Los Angeles Lakers. The Warriors would eventually start the season with a 24–0 record after getting their first loss on the road against the Milwaukee Bucks on December 12, 2015, ending their longest winning streak ever at 28 games between two seasons of regular season play.
- On November 29, 2015, Kobe Bryant announced he would retire after the end of the season. During twenty seasons, Bryant won five NBA championships, one season MVP award, and was selected to the All-Star Game seventeen times.
- The Philadelphia 76ers became the first team in league history to start out multiple seasons in a row with 0–17 records. They also ended up breaking the NBA record for longest losing streak with their 28 straight loss and tied the 2009–10 New Jersey Nets for the worst start to a season in league history before getting their first victory of the season on December 1, 2015, at home against the Los Angeles Lakers.
- On November 30, 2015, Dirk Nowitzki made his 10,000th career field goal in a loss to the Kings, becoming just the 13th player in NBA history to achieve that milestone.
- On December 1, 2015, Kevin Garnett overtook point guard and Milwaukee Bucks head coach Jason Kidd as the third-most-played player in league history by playing for 20 minutes in a close loss to the Orlando Magic.
- The Boston Celtics played against the Sacramento Kings on December 3, 2015, at the Mexico City Arena, with the Celtics winning 114–97.
- On December 5, 2015, Kevin Garnett scored his 26,000th career point in a loss to the Trail Blazers.
- On December 5, 2015, Rajon Rondo recorded his 5,000th career assist in a loss to the Rockets.
- On December 5, 2015, Pau Gasol played in his 1,000th career game in a loss to the Hornets.
- The Milwaukee Bucks became the first team to play on an alternative court design on December 9, 2015, against the Los Angeles Clippers.
- On December 9, 2015, Chris Paul recorded 18 assists in a road win against the Bucks, surpassing Tim Hardaway for 14th on the all-time assists list.
- On December 11, 2015, Kevin Garnett became the league's all-time leader in defensive rebounds, surpassing Karl Malone.
- On December 16, 2015, Paul Pierce scored his 26,000th career point in a win over the Bucks .
- On December 21, 2015, Chris Paul recorded 10 assists in a 100–99 home loss to the Oklahoma City Thunder, surpassing Terry Porter for thirteenth on the all-time assists list.
- On December 23, 2015, Dirk Nowitzki surpassed Shaquille O'Neal to become the NBA's sixth-highest all-time scorer. He scored 22 points in the Dallas Mavericks' 119–118 overtime victory over the Brooklyn Nets, including the game-winning lay-up.
- On December 26, 2015, Dwight Howard scored his 15,000th career point in a loss against the Pelicans, becoming the 4th youngest player ever to amass 15,000 points and 10,000 rebounds (Wilt Chamberlain, Bob Pettit and Moses Malone).
- On December 28, 2015, LeBron James passed Alex English for 17th on the all-time scoring list in the first quarter against the Phoenix Suns.
- On December 31, 2015, Chris Paul recorded 12 assists in a 20–19 road win against his former team, the New Orleans Pelicans, surpassing Lenny Wilkens for 12th on the all-time assists list.
- On January 7, 2016, Kobe Bryant scored his 33,000th career point in a loss to the Kings. He joined Kareem Abdul-Jabbar and Karl Malone (who, coincidentally enough, both played for the Lakers at one point) as the only NBA players to have 33,000 (or more) career points.
- On January 13, 2016, James Harden scored his 10,000th career point in a win against the Timberwolves.
- The Orlando Magic played against the Toronto Raptors on January 14, 2016, at The O2 Arena in London, with the Raptors winning 106–103 in overtime.
- On January 23, 2016, Carmelo Anthony overtook Gary Payton as the league's 30th-highest scorer of all time in a loss to the Charlotte Hornets.
- On January 25, 2016, Stephen Curry scored his 10,000th career point in a win against the Spurs. The game also marked the highest combined winning percentage between two teams, Spurs (.864) & Warriors (.909), this late in the season in NBA history.
- On January 29, 2016, LeBron James became the youngest (17th overall) player to ever score 26,000 points in a win against the Detroit Pistons.
- On February 3, 2016, LeBron James passed Kevin Garnett for 16th on the all-time scoring list in a loss against the Hornets.
- On February 10, 2016, before the All-Star Weekend commenced, LeBron James surpassed Paul Pierce to become the 15th-highest scoring player of all time in a victory against the Los Angeles Lakers.
- On February 21, 2016, Dirk Nowitzki became just the 6th player in NBA history to score 29,000 career points.
- On February 22, 2016, the Golden State Warriors defeated the Atlanta Hawks 102–92 to improve their overall record to 50–5, making them the fastest team to reach 50 wins in a season in NBA history.
- On February 24, 2016, Vince Carter passed Charles Barkley for 24th on the all-time scoring list in a win against the Lakers.
- On February 25, 2016, Stephen Curry made a 3-pointer in his 128th consecutive game, breaking Kyle Korver's NBA record of 127 consecutive games with a 3-pointer.
- On February 27, 2016, in a win against the Rockets, Tim Duncan surpassed Karl Malone for 6th on the all-time rebounds list, and also became just the fifth player in NBA history to record 3,000 career blocks.
- On February 27, 2016, during the Golden State Warriors' 121–118 overtime victory over the Oklahoma City Thunder, Stephen Curry made his 287th 3-pointer of the season, breaking his own NBA record of most 3-pointers in a single season (286) from the previous year. Curry made 12 total 3-pointers during the game, tying Kobe Bryant and Donyell Marshall for the most 3-pointers made by a single player in a single game in NBA history. This also made Curry the first player in NBA history to make at least ten three-pointers in two consecutive games.
- On February 27, 2016, the Golden State Warriors became the first team of the season to clinch a playoff berth after the San Antonio Spurs defeated the Houston Rockets. The Warriors beat out the 1985–86 Boston Celtics for the earliest clinch of a playoff berth by a team in NBA history by one calendar day. This was also the earliest a team had clinched a playoff spot in February since the 1987–88 Los Angeles Lakers.
- On March 3, 2016, the Golden State Warriors tied the 1995–96 Chicago Bulls for the longest regular-season home-game winning streak in NBA history (44 games) with a 121–106 win at home against the Oklahoma City Thunder. The Warriors' streak dated back to the previous year.
- On March 3, 2016, DeMar DeRozan set an NBA record for most consecutive free throws made (24) during the Toronto Raptors' win against the Portland Trail Blazers.
- On March 5, 2016, LeBron James surpassed Tim Duncan for 14th place on the all-time scoring list during the Cleveland Cavaliers' victory against the Boston Celtics.
- On March 6, 2016, the Los Angeles Lakers (who were 12–51 with a winning percentage of .190 at the time) recorded the biggest regular season upset in NBA history with a blowout 112–95 victory over the Golden State Warriors (who were 55–5 with a winning percentage of .917 at the time). It was also the first time in NBA history that a team with a winning percentage below .200 in the regular season had ever defeated a team with a winning percentage above .900 so late in the regular season.
- On March 7, 2016, LeBron James surpassed John Havlicek for 13th place on the all-time scoring list.
- On March 7, 2016, Stephen Curry became the first player in NBA history to score 300 three-pointers in a single season.
- On March 7, 2016, the Golden State Warriors recorded their 45th straight regular season home victory with a 119–113 home victory against the Orlando Magic, surpassing the 1995–96 Chicago Bulls for the longest regular-season home winning streak in NBA history. The Warriors' winning streak included their final 18 regular-season home games of the previous year.
- On March 10, 2016, Tim Duncan became just the sixth player in NBA history to record 15,000 career rebounds.
- On March 11, 2016, the Golden State Warriors and Portland Trail Blazers scored a combined 37 three-pointers, setting an NBA record for the most combined three-pointers between both teams in a single game. Golden State scored 18 three-pointers while Portland scored 19 three-pointers.
- On March 11, 2016, Klay Thompson became only the second player in NBA history to score at least 200 three-pointers in four straight seasons, joining Stephen Curry.
- On March 14, 2016, the Golden State Warriors became the fastest team in league history to reach 60 wins in a season.
- On March 18, 2016, Dwight Howard of the Houston Rockets passed 11,000 career rebounds in a 116–111 victory over the visiting Minnesota Timberwolves.
- On March 19, 2016, the prime time game between the Golden State Warriors and San Antonio Spurs set an NBA record for the highest combined winning percentage between two teams through at least 50 regular season games in NBA history (.882 combined winning percentage); the Golden State Warriors entered the game with a 62–6 win–loss record and a .912 winning percentage, while the San Antonio Spurs entered the game with a 58–10 win–loss record and a .853 winning percentage. The Spurs won the game by a score of 87–79 to earn their 44th straight regular season home victory, tying them with the 1995–96 Chicago Bulls for the second-longest regular-season home winning streak in NBA history.
- On March 19, 2016, Dwyane Wade became the 41st player in NBA history to reach 20,000 career points, doing so during the Miami Heat's 122–101 win against the Cleveland Cavaliers.
- On March 23, 2016, the San Antonio Spurs earned their 45th consecutive regular season home victory by blowing out the Miami Heat 112–88, surpassing the 1995–96 Chicago Bulls for the 2nd longest regular season home winning streak in NBA history.
- With their 63rd loss on March 23, 2016, the Philadelphia 76ers became only the second team to win fewer than twenty games in each of three consecutive seasons, equalling the Vancouver Grizzlies between 1995–96 and 1998–99. (Note: The 1998–99 season was shortened to 50 games by a lockout, but in the shortened season the Grizzlies were on pace for a 13–69 record over a full season and thus a fourth successive sub-20-win season.)
- On March 25, 2016, the San Antonio Spurs improved their home record for the season to 37–0, tying the 1995–96 Chicago Bulls for the best home start to a season in NBA history.
- On March 25, 2016, the Golden State Warriors and Dallas Mavericks scored a combined 39 three-pointers, breaking the previous NBA record of most combined three-pointers between both teams in a single game (37) that had been set by the Golden State Warriors and Portland Trail Blazers only 14 days earlier; Golden State scored 21 three-pointers while Dallas scored 18 three-pointers. Golden State's 21 three-pointers moved the team's season total to 938, which surpassed the previous year's mark of 933 three-pointers set by the Houston Rockets for the most 3-pointers made by a team in a single season in NBA history.
- On March 25, 2016, with their 128–120 win against the Dallas Mavericks, the Golden State Warriors became the second team in NBA history to record at least 65 wins in back-to-back seasons; their previous year's team had 67 victories. The only other team to record back-to-back seasons with at least 65 wins is the Chicago Bulls, who followed up their 72–10 campaign of 1995–96 with a 69-win season in 1996–97.
- On March 26, 2016, Kristaps Porziņģis became the first player in NBA history to record more than 1,000 points, record at least 500 rebounds, record at least 75 three-pointers, and block more than 100 shots in his rookie season.
- On March 27, 2016, Klay Thompson and Stephen Curry became the first set of teammates to combine for 600 three-pointers in a single season in NBA history during the Golden State Warriors' 117–105 victory against the Philadelphia 76ers.
- On March 30, 2016, the San Antonio Spurs improved their home record to 38–0 with a victory against the New Orleans Pelicans, which broke the record for the best home start to a season in NBA history that had previously been held by the 1995–96 Chicago Bulls.
- On March 30, 2016, Draymond Green became the first player in NBA history to record 1,000 points, 500 rebounds, 500 assists, 100 steals and 100 blocks in a single season.
- On March 31, 2016, LeBron James surpassed Dominique Wilkins for 12th place on the NBA's all-time career scoring leaders list.
- On April 1, 2016, LeBron James surpassed Oscar Robertson for 11th place on the NBA's all-time career scoring leaders list.
- On April 1, 2016, the Boston Celtics defeated the Golden State Warriors 109–106 at Oracle Arena, which ended Golden State's NBA-record regular-season home-game winning streak at 54 games. Golden State's loss left the San Antonio Spurs as the league's last remaining team with an undefeated regular season home record.
- On April 3, 2016, the Golden State Warriors became the first team in NBA history to score 1,000 three-pointers in a single season during their 136–111 win against the Portland Trail Blazers. The Warriors' win was their 69th win of the season, making them only the fourth team in NBA history to record at least 69 regular season wins, joining the 1971–72 Los Angeles Lakers and both the 1995–96 and 1996–97 Chicago Bulls. The Warriors also joined the 1991–92 Chicago Bulls as the only teams in NBA history to record at least 40 games with at least 30 assists in a single season.
- On April 3, 2016, the Memphis Grizzlies became the first team in NBA history to have 28 different players record game minutes during a single season, which is the most players a team has ever fielded during a single season.
- On April 5, 2016, with a Spurs victory over the Jazz, Tim Duncan joined Kareem Abdul-Jabbar and Robert Parish as one of only three players in NBA history to amass at least one thousand career regular season wins. Duncan also became the first (and so far, only) player to record 1,000 regular season victories with a single team.
- On April 5, 2016, Mirza Teletović of the Phoenix Suns broke the record for most three-pointers made by a reserve player during the regular season, which was originally set by Chuck Person during the 1994–95 season, by making 165 total three-pointers, including three in a 103–90 loss to the Atlanta Hawks.
- On April 7, 2016, the San Antonio Spurs–Golden State Warriors matchup on TNT marked the first game in NBA history between two teams with at least 65 wins each. The Warriors entered the game with 69 wins while the Spurs entered the game with 65 wins; the 134 combined wins between the two teams set a record for the most combined wins between two teams in a regular season matchup in NBA history. The Warriors won the game by a score of 112–101 to clinch the NBA's best record and home-court advantage throughout the entire playoffs. The win was Golden State's 70th victory of the season, making them only the second team in NBA history to record 70 regular-season wins, joining the 1995–96 Chicago Bulls.
- On April 9, 2016, the Golden State Warriors recorded their 33rd road win of the season with a 100–99 victory over the Memphis Grizzlies, tying the 1995–96 Chicago Bulls for the NBA record of most road wins by a team in a single season.
- On April 10, 2016, the Golden State Warriors–San Antonio Spurs matchup on NBA TV marked only the second game in NBA history between two teams with at least 65 wins each. The Warriors entered the game with 71 wins while the Spurs entered the game with 65 wins; the 136 combined wins between the two teams broke the record of most combined wins between two teams in a regular season matchup in NBA history that had been set (by the same two teams) three days earlier. The Warriors won the game 92–86 to clinch their 72nd win of the season, which tied the 1995–96 Chicago Bulls for the most regular-season wins by a team in NBA history. The win also ended the Warriors' losing streak at AT&T Center, with their last win occurring in 1997. The Warriors also recorded their 34th road win of the season, which surpassed that same 1995–96 Chicago Bulls team for the most road wins by a team in a single season in NBA history. The win also ensured that the Warriors would become both the first team in NBA history to go through a full regular season without ever losing back-to-back games as well as the first team in NBA history to go through a full regular season without ever losing multiple games to a single opponent.
- On April 10, 2016, San Antonio's home loss to the Golden State Warriors snapped their NBA-record streak of 39 consecutive home wins to begin a season and their regular season home game winning streak of 48 games dating back to the previous year, which was second to only Golden State's record 54 straight regular-season home game winning streak for the longest in NBA history.
- On April 10, 2016, the Philadelphia 76ers became the sixth team to lose seventy games in a season, following the 1972–73 76ers, the 1986–87 Los Angeles Clippers, the 1992–93 Dallas Mavericks, the 1997–98 Denver Nuggets and the 2009–10 New Jersey Nets. The 76ers became the first team in NBA history to lose at least 70 regular season games in two separate seasons. The 76ers would finish 10–72, one win ahead of their own worst 82-game record set in the 1972–73 season.
- On April 11, 2016, Russell Westbrook recorded his 18th triple-double of the season, tying Magic Johnson for the most triple-doubles by a single player in a single season since the ABA–NBA merger in 1976.
- On April 12, 2016, the San Antonio Spurs defeated the Oklahoma City Thunder 102–98 in overtime to tie the 1985–86 Boston Celtics for the best regular season home record in NBA history (40–1), with their only regular season home loss occurring on April 10 against the Golden State Warriors. The Spurs' win also assured that they would end the regular season with a winning percentage higher than .800, making this season the first in NBA history in which two teams (the other team being the Warriors) ended the regular season with winning percentages higher than .800. (Note: For comparison, in three consecutive seasons – 1996–97's Vancouver Grizzlies and Boston Celtics; 1997–98's Denver Nuggets and Toronto Raptors; and 1998–99's Vancouver Grizzlies and Los Angeles Clippers—but in no others, two teams finished with winning percentages below .200.)
- On April 13, 2016, the Golden State Warriors won their final game of the year to finish the regular season with a 73–9 record, thus setting an NBA record for most regular season wins in one season. The previous record belonged to the 1995–96 Chicago Bulls, who finished with a 72–10 record.
- This was the first season in NBA history in which a team would not lose back-to-back regular season games, as well as the first season in NBA history in which a team would not lose to the same opponent twice in the regular season (both of those feats were accomplished by the Golden State Warriors).
- On April 13, 2016, Kobe Bryant, playing in the final NBA game of his career, scored 60 points in a comeback win against the Jazz. Kobe became the oldest player ever to score 60 points in a game, and set the record for most points scored by a player in their final career game. Bryant shot a career-high 50 field goal attempts and 21 three-point attempts in the game, and became just the fifth player in NBA history to shoot at least 10,000 career free throw attempts.
- On April 13, 2016, Stephen Curry became the first player in NBA history to make 400 three-pointers in a single season. Curry made a total of 10 three-pointers during the Golden State Warriors' NBA-record 73rd regular season win to finish the regular season with a total of 402 three-pointers, 116 more three-pointers than his previous NBA record mark for most three-pointers in a single season (286).
- James Harden set an NBA single-season record for turnovers with 374. On April 7, he tied the previous record of 366, set by Artis Gilmore of the Chicago Bulls during the 1977–78 season (the first season that individual turnovers were recorded), and in his next game, on April 10, he broke the record.
- For the first time since 2004–05, all eight seeded teams in the East finished with a record over .500 in a full season (thus excluding the 2011–12 season, which was shortened to 66 games due to a strike).
- On April 20, 2016, the Cleveland Cavaliers made 20 three-pointers in a 107–90 win against the Detroit Pistons, tying the NBA record for the most made three-pointers by a team in a playoff game.
- On April 24, 2016, the Golden State Warriors made 21 three-pointers during their 121–94 win against the Houston Rockets, which set a new NBA record for the most three-pointers made by a team in a playoff game. The former record for most three-pointers made by a team in a playoff game was 20, which the Cleveland Cavaliers had equaled only four days beforehand.
- On April 27, 2016, Klay Thompson became the first player in NBA history to score at least seven 3-pointers in consecutive playoff games.
- On April 29, 2016, with the Pacers' 101–83 win over the Raptors in Game 6 of their first-round playoff series, it was ensured that there would be at least one Game 7 in the playoffs for the seventeenth straight year. The last time when there were no Game 7's at any point during the playoffs came during the 1999 NBA playoffs.
- On May 1, 2016, the Toronto Raptors beat the Indiana Pacers 89–84 for their first Game 7 victory in franchise history. It was the Raptors' first ever best-of-seven games playoff series win and their first playoff series win overall since 2001.
- On May 1, 2016, Klay Thompson became the first player in NBA history to score at least seven 3-pointers in three straight playoff games.
- On May 4, 2016, the Cleveland Cavaliers set an NBA playoff record by making 18 three-pointers in the first half of their 123–98 rout of the Atlanta Hawks, 10 of which occurred during the second quarter, which also set an NBA playoff record for most three-pointers in a quarter. They then broke the record for the most three-pointers in a playoff game set by the Golden State Warriors ten days earlier with 25 total three-pointers, which set another NBA record for the most three-pointers made by a team in any regular season or postseason game.
- On May 6, 2016, the Cleveland Cavaliers became the first team in NBA history to hit 20 three-pointers in consecutive games, making 21 in a game against the Atlanta Hawks two days after setting an NBA record with 25.
- On May 8, 2016, the Cleveland Cavaliers completed a four-game sweep of the Atlanta Hawks with a 100–99 win. The Cavaliers finished the game with 16 three-pointers, making them the first team in NBA history to score at least 15 three-pointers in four consecutive games.
- On May 9, 2016, Stephen Curry returned to play after missing two weeks due to a MCL sprain and scored 40 points to lead the Golden State Warriors to a 132–125 overtime win against the Portland Trail Blazers. Curry scored 17 of his 40 points during the overtime period, setting an NBA record for most points ever scored by a single player in an overtime period in any NBA regular season or postseason game.
- On May 10, 2016, Stephen Curry was named the NBA's Most Valuable Player (MVP) for the second straight season. Curry also became the first player in NBA history to win the MVP award by unanimous vote, winning all 131 first-place votes. Previously, Shaquille O'Neal and LeBron James were the two players that had come closest to winning the MVP award by unanimous vote, falling short by one vote in the 1999–2000 and 2012–13 seasons, respectively.
- On May 11, 2016, Stephen Curry scored five 3-pointers in the Golden State Warriors' 125–121 win over the Portland Trail Blazers, extending his streak of consecutive playoff games with at least one made 3-pointer to 44 games, which tied the NBA record set by Reggie Miller.
- On May 15, 2016, the Toronto Raptors earned their first Eastern Conference Finals appearance in franchise history, beating the Miami Heat four games to three in their semifinal series.
- On May 16, 2016, Stephen Curry made a 3-pointer in his 45th consecutive playoff game, which surpassed Reggie Miller (44) for the NBA record of most consecutive playoff games with at least one made 3-pointer.
- On May 19, 2016, Cleveland Cavaliers coach Tyronn Lue became the first coach in NBA history to win his first 10 playoff games.
- On May 25, 2016, the Cleveland Cavaliers set a conference finals record by taking a 31-point lead at halftime against the Toronto Raptors.
- On May 27, 2016, LeBron James became the eighth player in NBA history to reach six straight NBA Finals. James is the first player to not be part of the Boston Celtics' 1960s dynasty and the first player in 50 years to accomplish the feat.
- On May 28, 2016, New Orleans Pelicans player Bryce Dejean-Jones died when he was shot after breaking into a Dallas apartment. He is the first active NBA player to die since 2007 when Eddie Griffin was killed in a vehicular accident.
- On May 28, 2016, Klay Thompson set an NBA playoff record with 11 three-pointers during the Golden State Warriors' 108–101 win against the Oklahoma City Thunder.
- On May 30, 2016, the Golden State Warriors became the 3rd defending champion in NBA history, and the 10th team overall, to come back and win a best-of-seven playoff series after facing a 3–1 series deficit.
- On June 5, 2016, the Golden State Warriors tied the 1995–96 Chicago Bulls for the most combined regular season and postseason wins in a single season (87) in NBA history by defeating the Cleveland Cavaliers in Game 2 of the NBA Finals.
- On June 10, 2016, the Golden State Warriors earned their 88th win of the season (regular season and playoffs combined) by defeating the Cleveland Cavaliers in Game 4 of the NBA Finals, surpassing the 1995–96 Chicago Bulls' record of most combined regular season and postseason wins in a single season in NBA history. During the game, the Warriors also made 17 three-pointers, setting a record for most made three-pointers by a single team in an NBA Finals game.
- On June 13, 2016, Kyrie Irving and LeBron James became the first pair of teammates in NBA history to score 40 or more points each in the same NBA Finals game during the Cleveland Cavaliers' 112–97 victory in Game 5 of the NBA Finals.
- On June 16, 2016, the Cleveland Cavaliers defeated the Golden State Warriors in Game 6 of the NBA Finals by a score of 115–101, making them only the third team in NBA Finals history to force a Game 7 after falling behind 1–3. The only other two teams to accomplish this feat are the 1950–51 New York Knicks and the 1965–66 Los Angeles Lakers.
- On June 19, 2016, the Cleveland Cavaliers defeated the Golden State Warriors 93–89 in Game 7 of the 2016 NBA Finals to claim their first-ever league title. The Warriors became the 11th team overall to lose a seven-game playoff series after leading 3–1, and the first one to do so in the NBA Finals. The Cavaliers became the first NBA team to win a championship by winning a game 7 on the road since the Seattle SuperSonics did so in 1979.
- On June 19, 2016, LeBron James became the first player, in any playoff series, to lead all players in points, rebounds, assists, steals and blocks.

== See also ==
- List of NBA regular season records
