= Hassan Whiteside =

American basketball player (born 1989)

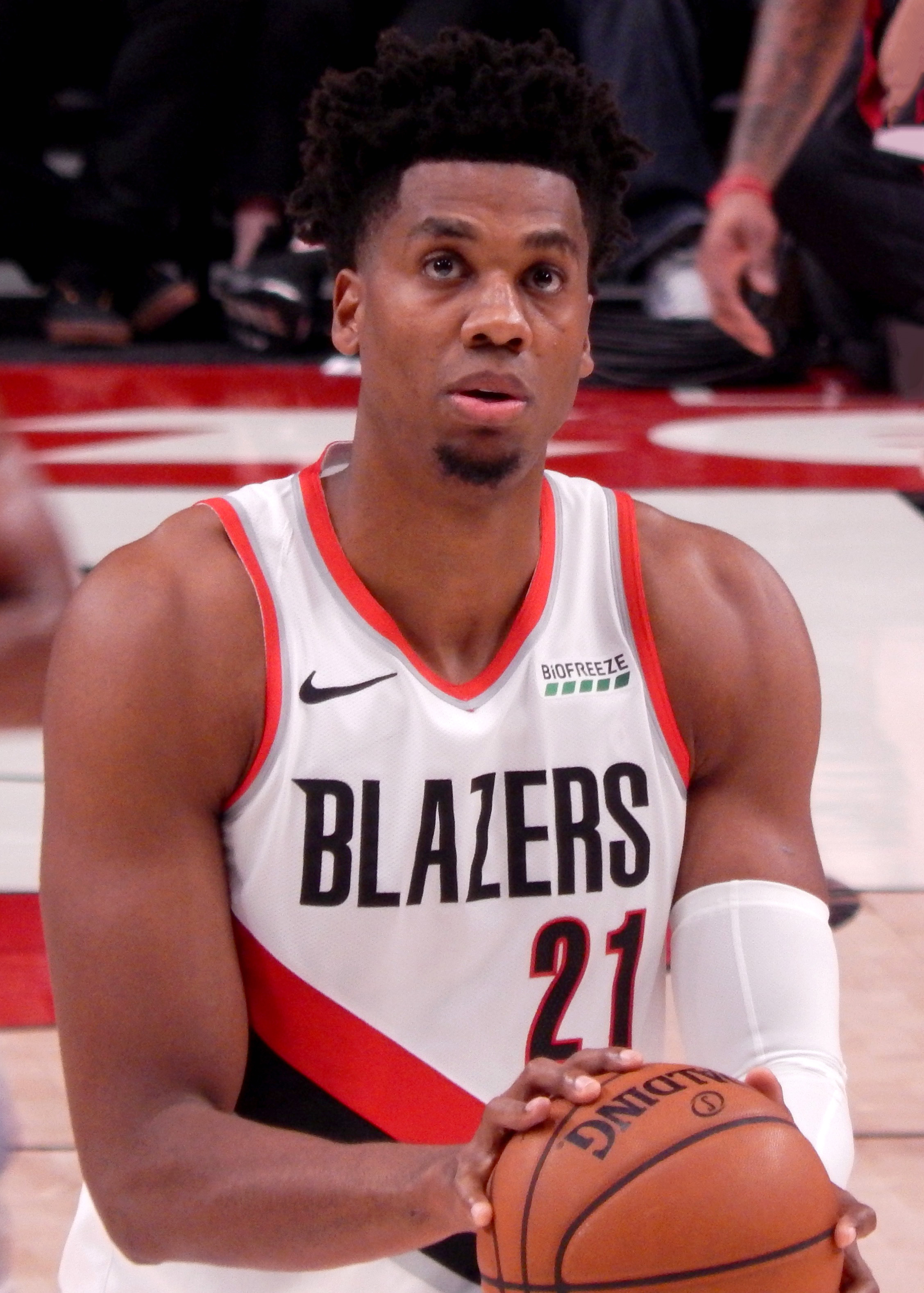
- Whiteside with the Portland Trail Blazers in 2019

Free agent
- Title: Center

Personal information
- Born: June 13, 1989 (age 37) Gastonia, North Carolina, U.S.
- Listed height: 7 ft 0 in (2.13 m)
- Listed weight: 265 lb (120 kg)

Career information
- High school: East Side (Newark, New Jersey); Hope Christian Academy (Kings Mountain, North Carolina); The Patterson School (Lenoir, North Carolina)
- College: Marshall (2009–2010)
- NBA draft: 2010: 2nd round, 33rd overall pick
- Drafted by: Sacramento Kings
- Playing career: 2010–present
- Position: Center

Career history
- 2010–2012: Sacramento Kings
- 2010–2012: →Reno Bighorns
- 2012–2013: Sioux Falls Skyforce
- 2013: Rio Grande Valley Vipers
- 2013: Amchit Club
- 2013: Sichuan Blue Whales
- 2013–2014: Al Mouttahed Tripoli
- 2014: Jiangsu Tongxi
- 2014: Iowa Energy
- 2014–2019: Miami Heat
- 2014: →Sioux Falls Skyforce
- 2019–2020: Portland Trail Blazers
- 2020–2021: Sacramento Kings
- 2021–2022: Utah Jazz
- 2023: Piratas de Quebradillas
- 2025: Cangrejeros de Santurce
- 2025–2026: Shanghai Sharks

Career highlights
- NBA All-Defensive Second Team (2016); NBA rebounding leader (2017); 2× NBA blocks leader (2016, 2020); CBA champion (2026); CBA Club Cup champion (2026); CBA Defensive Player of the Year (2026); All-LBL First Team (2014); LBL blocks leader (2014); NBL-China champion (2013); NBL-China Finals MVP (2013); NBL-China Defensive Player of the Year (2013); BSN Defensive Player of the Year (2023); BSN rebounding leader (2023); BSN blocks leader (2023); NBA G League champion (2013); NCAA blocks leader (2010); Second-team All-Conference USA (2010); Conference USA Defensive Player of the Year (2010); Conference USA Freshman of the Year (2010)
- Stats at NBA.com
- Stats at Basketball Reference

Hassan Niam Whiteside (born June 13, 1989) is an American professional basketball player who last played for the Shanghai Sharks of the Chinese Basketball Association. He played college basketball for the Marshall Thundering Herd before being selected in the second round by the Sacramento Kings in the 2010 NBA draft. After joining the Miami Heat in 2014, Whiteside was named to the NBA All-Defensive Second Team in 2016, when he also led the NBA in blocks. He led the league in rebounding in 2017. He was traded to the Portland Trail Blazers and again led the league in blocks in his first season with Portland. Whiteside has also played on Chinese, Lebanese and Puerto Rican teams.

== Early life ==
Whiteside grew up with six siblings and a single mother. Born and raised in Gastonia, North Carolina, he attended three high schools in two years within the area: Hunter Huss High School, Ashbrook High School, and Forestview High School.

For his junior year of high school in 2006–2007, Whiteside moved in with his father in Newark, New Jersey, playing at East Side High School. After averaging 18 points, 10 rebounds, and 5.5 blocked shots per game, Whiteside went back to North Carolina for the 2007–2008 school year and attended Hope Christian Academy in Kings Mountain, North Carolina. In 2008–2009, he played prep basketball at The Patterson School in Lenoir, North Carolina, where he helped lead Patterson to a 34–2 record and a No. 1 national ranking with future Marshall teammate DeAndre Kane.

Whiteside was rated as the No. 19 center in the Class of 2009 according to Scout.com, and ranked as the No. 87 recruit in the Class of 2009 by Rivals.com. He played in the 2009 Reebok All-American preview game, and was a member of both the United Celtics (NC) AAU Team and the New Jersey Panthers AAU team as a high schooler.

== College career ==
Whiteside chose Marshall over UNC Charlotte, South Carolina, Kentucky, Auburn, and Mississippi State.

Whiteside came to Marshall University under the radar during the start of the 2009–10 season, but it did not take long for him to make national attention. He was spotlighted in the edition of December 28 of ESPN The Magazine's College Basketball column after he amassed 14 points, 17 rebounds and nine blocked shots over 29 minutes in a 60–53 win over the Ohio University Bobcats on November 28. A few weeks later on December 12, Whiteside recorded the Thundering Herd's first triple-double in a 105–54 rout of the Brescia Bearcats, scoring 17 points, grabbing 14 rebounds and blocking 11 shots. Whiteside would go on to have two more triple-doubles on the year against the UCF Knights on January 13, and February 27. He finished the season as the nation's leader in blocked shots with 182, and he also broke the C-USA record held by Tulsa's Jerome Jordan for most blocked shots in a single season and the Marshall record for the most blocked shots in a single season and career all in his first year. The 182 blocks were also a national record for a freshman in a single season, topping 177 by BYU's Shawn Bradley in 1990–91.

On March 29, 2010, Whiteside declared himself eligible for the 2010 NBA draft, after Marshall head coach, Donnie Jones, accepted the head coaching job at Conference USA rival UCF Knights.

== Professional career ==
=== Sacramento Kings (2010–2012) ===
Whiteside was selected by the Sacramento Kings with the 33rd overall pick in the 2010 NBA draft. He played in the Kings' season opener, recording two fouls in two minutes against the Minnesota Timberwolves, before failing to appear in another game for the Kings all season. He spent time with the Kings' D-League affiliate, the Reno Bighorns, between November 29 and January 9, before being ruled out for four to six months on March 4 after undergoing surgery to repair a partially torn patellar tendon in his left knee.

Between January 1 and February 3 of the lockout-shortened 2011–12 season, Whiteside was on assignment with the Reno Bighorns. Between February 15 and April 11, he played in 18 games for the Kings, including having a 10-rebound effort on April 8 against the Houston Rockets. On July 16, 2012, he was waived by the Kings.

=== Sioux Falls Skyforce (2012–2013) ===
On December 14, 2012, Whiteside was acquired by the Sioux Falls Skyforce of the NBA Development League.

=== Rio Grande Valley Vipers (2013) ===
On January 4, 2013, Whiteside was traded to the Rio Grande Valley Vipers in exchange for Damian Saunders.

=== Amchit Club (2013) ===
Whiteside left the Vipers prior to the playoffs and joined Lebanese club Amchit Club in late April 2013.

=== Sichuan Blue Whales (2013) ===
After three games for Amchit in early May, Whiteside left Lebanon and joined the Chinese NBL team Sichuan Blue Whales. In his first game with the Blue Whales, Whiteside recorded 28 points and 21 rebounds in an 85–69 win over Hebei Xianglian. In 27 games, he averaged 25.7 points, 16.6 rebounds, 1.4 steals and 5.1 blocks per game.

=== Al Mouttahed Tripoli (2013–2014) ===
In November 2013, Whiteside moved to Lebanon after signing with Al Mouttahed Tripoli.

=== Jiangsu Tongxi (2014) ===
In April 2014, Whiteside was released by Tripoli and returned to China. He joined Chinese NBL team Jiangsu Tongxi, where in 17 games, he averaged 29.6 points, 16.4 rebounds, 1.3 assists and 4.3 blocks per game.

=== Iowa Energy (2014) ===
After spending Summer League with the Toronto Raptors and preseason with the Memphis Grizzlies, Whiteside joined the Grizzlies' D-League affiliate, the Iowa Energy, in November 2014. On November 19, he was called up by the Grizzlies to fill out their roster against Toronto due to multiple injuries. He was waived the next day and re-joined Iowa.

=== Miami Heat (2014–2019) ===
==== 2014–15 season ====
On November 24, 2014, Whiteside signed with the Miami Heat. On December 13, he was assigned to the Sioux Falls Skyforce, but was recalled two days later. On January 4, 2015, he recorded his first career double-double with 11 points, 10 rebounds and 5 blocks in an 88–84 win over the Brooklyn Nets.

On January 11, 2015, Whiteside recorded a then career-high 23 points, 16 rebounds, 2 steals and 2 blocks in a 104–90 win against the Los Angeles Clippers. On January 25, he recorded his first career triple-double with 14 points, 13 rebounds, and franchise record 12 blocks in a 96–84 win over the Chicago Bulls. In the process, Whiteside became just the fourth player in the previous 25 years with at least 12 points, 12 rebounds and 12 blocks in a game, and the first player since Manute Bol with 12 blocks off the bench in 25 minutes or less. Bol had 13 blocks in 23 minutes. On February 4, he scored a then career-high 24 points on 12-of-13 shooting along with 20 rebounds in a loss to the Minnesota Timberwolves. His 90% field goal shooting and his 20/20 night made him one of only four players in NBA history to achieve such a feat.

On March 2, 2015, Whiteside got into a fight with Alex Len of the Phoenix Suns. The following day, the NBA fined Whiteside $15,000 for his role in the altercation. On March 10, he was suspended for one game without pay for striking Kelly Olynyk during the Heat's March 9 loss to the Boston Celtics. He went on to finish fourth in the NBA Most Improved Player Award voting. During his first season with the Heat, Whiteside averaged a double-double with 11.8 points and 10 rebounds per game.

==== 2015–16 season ====
On November 1, 2015, Whiteside scored a then career-high 25 points in a 109–89 win over the Houston Rockets. On November 17, he recorded his second career triple-double with 22 points, 14 rebounds and 10 blocks in a loss to the Minnesota Timberwolves. He became the seventh player in NBA history with multiple points-rebounds-blocks triple-doubles. On November 23, in a game against the New York Knicks, Whiteside blocked five shots, giving him 63 through 13 games. The previous Heat record for blocks at this point of the season belonged to Alonzo Mourning, who had 50 to open the 1998–99 season. On December 9, he recorded three blocks against the Charlotte Hornets, thus opening the season with two or more blocks in all 20 games, trailing only Mark Eaton (24, 1988–89 with Utah) and Shaquille O'Neal (23, 1992–93 with Orlando) for longest streaks to start a season. His streak ended at 21 after he failed to record a block on December 13 against the Memphis Grizzlies.

On January 15, 2016, Whiteside recorded his third career triple-double with 19 points, 17 rebounds and 11 blocked shots in a 98–95 win over the Denver Nuggets. Between January 22 and February 2, he missed six games with a left hip injury. He returned to action on February 3, recording 10 points, nine rebounds and five blocks in 17 minutes off the bench in a 93–90 win over the Dallas Mavericks. Two days later, he recorded his third triple-double of the season and fourth of his career with 10 points, 10 rebounds and 10 blocked shots in 27 minutes off the bench in a 98–95 win over the Charlotte Hornets. On February 20, he recorded 25 points and 23 rebounds off the bench in a 114–94 win over the Washington Wizards, marking just the 11th time in NBA history that a player has had at least 20 points and 20 rebounds in a game off the bench. Whiteside also blocked two shots in that game, giving him 300 with the Heat in 94 games, which is the fastest a Heat player has reached the 300-block mark. Alonzo Mourning was the previous fastest as he needed 108 games to accomplish the feat. In the Heat's next game the following day against the Indiana Pacers, Whiteside grabbed his 1,000th career rebound in his 95th game, marking the fastest anyone has reached that milestone in Heat history, ahead of Alonzo Mourning (96), Kevin Willis (98) and Shaquille O'Neal (99). On March 1, he recorded a career-high 26 points and 14 rebounds in a 129–111 win over the Chicago Bulls. He topped that mark on March 28, scoring 27 points in a 110–99 win over the Brooklyn Nets.

The Heat finished the regular season as the third seed in the Eastern Conference with a 48–34 record. Whiteside finished as the league's leading shot-blocker in 2015–16, and he earned selection to the NBA All-Defensive Second Team. In the first round of the playoffs, the Heat faced the sixth-seeded Charlotte Hornets, and in a Game 1 win on April 17, Whiteside made his postseason debut with 21 points and 11 rebounds. The Heat went on to lose to the Toronto Raptors in the second round.

==== 2016–17 season ====
On July 7, 2016, Whiteside re-signed with the Heat on a four-year, $98 million contract. Whiteside became the first player in NBA history to go from a league minimum salary to a max level contract. In the Heat's season opener on October 26, Whiteside recorded 18 points, 14 rebounds and four blocked shots in a 108–96 win over the Orlando Magic. On October 30, he tied his career high with 27 points and grabbed 15 rebounds in a 106–99 loss to the San Antonio Spurs. With 21 points and 16 rebounds against the Toronto Raptors on November 4, Whiteside recorded his fifth straight double-double, a franchise record streak to open a season. On November 10, he recorded 20 points and 20 rebounds against the Chicago Bulls for his third career 20–20 game. The only player to have more in a Heat uniform is Rony Seikaly, with 12. Five days later, he scored 19 points and grabbed an NBA season-high 25 rebounds in a 93–90 loss to the Atlanta Hawks. On November 21, in a loss to the Philadelphia 76ers, Whiteside set a career high with 32 points while reaching double digits in rebounds for the 13th consecutive game to start the season. On December 14, he recorded 26 points and 22 rebounds in a 95–89 win over the Indiana Pacers, marking his fourth career 20–20 game. Whiteside went on to miss four games in early January with a right retinal contusion. On February 1, 2017, Whiteside grabbed his 2,000th rebound in a 116–93 win over Atlanta; he finished the game with 18 points and 18 rebounds. Three days later, he scored 30 points and grabbed 20 rebounds in just 27 minutes in a 125–102 win over the Philadelphia 76ers, extending Miami's winning streak to 10. The 30–20 game was the first of his career, and the ninth in Heat history including playoffs. He joined Bill Laimbeer as the only players in NBA history to post a 30-point, 20-rebound game in no more than 27 minutes—Laimbeer did it in the 1984–85 season. On March 12, he had 26 points and 21 rebounds in a 102–98 loss to Indiana. It was Whiteside's fifth 20/20 game this season. He also tied his career high with 10 offensive rebounds in the game. On March 21, he had a 23-point, 14-rebound performance in a 112–97 win over the Phoenix Suns. He reached 936 rebounds for the season during the game, setting a single-season franchise record by going two above Seikaly's 1991–92 total (934). Whiteside also recorded his 57th double-digit rebound game of the season, a Heat record—one more than Seikaly in 1991–92. On April 2 against Denver, Whiteside became the first Heat player to record 1,000 points and 1,000 rebounds in a season. Whiteside finished the season as the league's leading rebounder.

==== 2017–18 season ====
In the Heat's season opener against the Orlando Magic on October 18, 2017, Whiteside had 26 points and 22 rebounds in a 116–109 loss, becoming the first player since Kevin Garnett in 2007 to score at least 20 points and grab at least 20 rebounds on opening night. On November 1, 2017, he returned from a five-game absence with a bruised knee and scored 13 points and grabbed 14 rebounds in a 97–91 win over the Chicago Bulls. On December 26, 2017, he returned from an 11-game absence with a bone bruise in his left knee and had seven points and eight rebounds in 18 minutes in a 107–89 win over the Orlando Magic. On January 17, 2018, he had a season-high 27 points, 13 rebounds and six blocks to lead the Heat to a 106–101 victory over the Milwaukee Bucks. Whiteside missed nine games in March with a hip injury.

==== 2018–19 season ====
On October 29, 2018, Whiteside had an NBA season-high 24 rebounds to go with 16 points and five blocked shots in a 123–113 loss to the Sacramento Kings. On November 7, he had 29 points, 20 rebounds and an NBA season-high nine blocked shots in a 95–88 win over the San Antonio Spurs. Whiteside had eight blocked shots in the first half, setting a Heat record for any half; the previous first-half mark was seven by Alonzo Mourning in 1999, while the second-half mark is seven by Whiteside. On November 20, he had 21 points and 23 rebounds in a 104–92 loss to the Brooklyn Nets. In March 2019, he was relegated to a reserve role after coming off a hip injury.

=== Portland Trail Blazers (2019–2020) ===
On July 6, 2019, Whiteside was traded to the Portland Trail Blazers as part of a four-team trade also involving the Los Angeles Clippers, and Philadelphia 76ers. On November 29, 2019, Whiteside scored 8 points, grabbed 15 rebounds and recorded a season-high 10 blocks. His 10 blocks set a Trail Blazers' franchise record for blocks in a single game. The previous record holder was Bill Walton who recorded 9 blocks in two different occasions.

=== Return to Sacramento (2020–2021) ===
On November 27, 2020, the Sacramento Kings announced that they had signed Whiteside to a one-year contract.

=== Utah Jazz (2021–2022) ===
On August 6, 2021, Whiteside signed with the Utah Jazz. He spent the season as backup to Rudy Gobert. Despite playing only 17.9 minutes per game, Whiteside averaged 1.6 blocks per game, ranking 8th in the league in that category.

=== Piratas de Quebradillas (2023) ===
On March 14, 2023, Whiteside signed with the Piratas de Quebradillas of the Baloncesto Superior Nacional.

On February 13, 2024, Whiteside informed the Piratas de Quebradillas management of his retirement from basketball.

=== Cangrejeros de Santurce (2025) ===
On April 7, 2025, Whiteside signed officially with the Cangrejeros de Santurce of the Baloncesto Superior Nacional. He also confirmed he didn't retire, he took a one year hiatus to recover from a shoulder injury which required him to have surgery.

=== Shanghai Sharks (2025–2026) ===
In December 2025, Whiteside joined the Shanghai Sharks of the Chinese Basketball Association (CBA). During the 2025–26 season, he averaged 10.8 points, 8.6 rebounds and 1.5 blocks per game.

Whiteside helped Shanghai win the 2026 CBA championship, defeating the Zhejiang Guangsha Lions in the finals to claim the franchise's first league title since 2002. He was named the CBA Defensive Player of the Year and selected to the league's All-Defensive Team.

In September 2026, Whiteside represented Shanghai at the FIBA Intercontinental Cup in Beijing.

== Career statistics ==
Legend
GP	Games played	GS	Games started	MPG	Minutes per game
FG%	Field goal percentage	3P%	3-point field goal percentage	FT%	Free throw percentage
RPG	Rebounds per game	APG	Assists per game	SPG	Steals per game
BPG	Blocks per game	PPG	Points per game	**Bold**	Career high
*	Led the league

=== NBA ===
==== Regular season ====
Year	Team	GP	GS	MPG	FG%	3P%	FT%	RPG	APG	SPG	BPG	PPG
2010–11	Sacramento	1	0	2.0	—	—	—	.0	.0	.0	.0	.0
2011–12	Sacramento	18	0	6.1	.444	—	.417	2.2	.0	.2	.8	1.6
2014–15	Miami	48	32	23.8	.628	—	.500	10.0	.1	.6	2.6	11.8
2015–16	Miami	73	43	29.1	.606	—	.650	11.8	.4	.6	**3.7***	14.2
2016–17	Miami	**77**	**77**	**32.6**	.557	—	.628	**14.1***	.7	**.7**	2.1	**17.0**
2017–18	Miami	54	54	25.3	.540	**1.000**	**.703**	11.4	1.0	**.7**	1.7	14.0
2018–19	Miami	72	53	23.3	.571	.125	.449	11.3	.8	.6	1.9	12.3
2019–20	Portland	67	61	30.0	.621	.571	.686	13.5	**1.2**	.4	2.9*	15.5
2020–21	Sacramento	36	4	15.2	.563	.000	.519	6.0	.6	.3	1.3	8.1
2021–22	Utah	65	8	17.9	**.652**	—	.623	7.6	.4	.3	1.6	8.2
Career		511	332	24.7	.586	.308	.605	10.8	.6	.5	2.2	12.6

==== Playoffs ====
Year	Team	GP	GS	MPG	FG%	3P%	FT%	RPG	APG	SPG	BPG	PPG
2016	Miami	**10**	**10**	**29.1**	**.681**	—	.591	**10.9**	.3	**.8**	**2.8**	**12.0**
2018	Miami	5	5	15.4	.450	—	**.615**	6.0	.2	.0	1.2	5.2
2020	Portland	5	3	21.2	.542	**1.000**	.500	7.0	**.4**	.2	2.0	6.8
2022	Utah	6	0	10.8	.417	—	.250	5.2	.0	.3	1.3	1.8
Career		26	18	20.7	.592	1.000	.560	7.9	.2	.4	2.0	7.3

=== NBA D-League ===
==== Regular season ====
Year	Team	GP	GS	MPG	FG%	3P%	FT%	RPG	APG	SPG	BPG	PPG
2010–11	Reno	14	3	10.6	.509	–	.412	2.7	.1	.2	2.1	4.4
2011–12	Reno	11	**5**	18.9	.521	–	.343	6.5	.4	.5	3.0	7.8
2012–13	Sioux Falls	7	3	16.4	.667	–	.640	7.7	.3	**.7**	1.4	10.3
2012–13	Rio Grande Valley	**29**	0	10.6	.533	.000	**.679**	4.7	.2	.3	2.0	5.7
2014–15	Iowa	3	3	**28.7**	.857	–	.667	**15.7**	.3	.7	**5.3**	**22.0**
2014–15	Sioux Falls	1	1	26.0	**.909**	–	.500	12.0	**2.0**	.0	4.0	21.0
Career		65	13	13.7	.590	.000	.553	5.5	.2	.4	2.3	7.2

=== CBA ===
†	Won CBA championship

==== Regular season ====
Year	Team	GP	MPG	FG%	3P%	FT%	RPG	APG	SPG	BPG	PPG
2025–26†	Shanghai	32	14.8	.667	.750	.532	8.8	.6	.3	1.4	11.0

==== Playoffs ====
Year	Team	GP	MPG	FG%	3P%	FT%	RPG	APG	SPG	BPG	PPG
2026†	Shanghai	6	17.2	.581	.000	.643	7.7	.3	1.0	1.7	9.8

=== College ===
*	Led NCAA Division I

Year	Team	GP	GS	MPG	FG%	3P%	FT%	RPG	APG	SPG	BPG	PPG
2009–10	Marshall	34	23	26.1	.524	.600	.588	8.9	.3	.6	5.4*	13.1

== Awards and honors ==
NCAA

- 2010 Sporting News second team All-American
- 2010 Conference USA Defensive Player of the Year
- 2010 Conference USA Freshman of the Year
- 2010 Conference USA All-Freshman Team
- 2010 A member of FOXSports.com's All-Freshman Team
- 2010 CBSSports.com Freshman All-American Team
- 2010 Conference USA All-Defensive Team
- 2010 Conference USA 7-time Rookie of The Week
- 2010 Second Team All-Conference USA
- 2010 NCAA Second Team All-Freshman Team
- 2010 NCAA Division I blocks leader
- 2019 First NCAA Conference USA player to ever record three triple-doubles in a season

NBA

- NBA All-Defensive Second Team (2016)
- NBA rebounding leader (2017)
- 2× NBA blocks leader (2016, 2020)

== Personal life ==
Whiteside is the son of Hasson Arbubakrr and Debbie Whiteside. His father played in the NFL for the Minnesota Vikings and Tampa Bay Buccaneers from 1983 to 1984. Whiteside has a younger brother named Nassan, who has autism. In 2012, Nassan's Place was incorporated in the state of New Jersey as a non-profit organization. Nassan's Place provides low to moderate income families the opportunity to receive quality and affordable care for their children in a safe and carefree environment.

In January 2017, Whiteside wired $2.75 million to attorney Michael Avenatti as the first payment in a $3 million-settlement with ex-girlfriend Alexis Gardner, who was represented by Avenatti in the settlement. Avenatti allegedly embezzled all but $194,000 of the $3 million that Whiteside paid in total, even though he was legally entitled to only a little more than $1 million in legal fees. This news came to light during an April 10, 2019 indictment of Avenatti by a federal grand jury in Santa Ana, California. "We entered into a mutually agreed upon settlement more than two years ago following the end of our relationship; a settlement that reflected Alexis' investment of time and support over a number of years as Hassan pursued a career in the NBA," Whiteside and Gardner told The Los Angeles Times in a statement released by his agent.

== See also ==
- List of NBA career field goal percentage leaders
- List of NBA annual blocks leaders
- List of NBA single-game blocks leaders
- List of NCAA Division I men's basketball players with 13 or more blocks in a game
- List of NCAA Division I men's basketball season blocks leaders
