= John Whiteside (disambiguation) =

John Whiteside may be:

- John Whiteside (1773–1830), American politician
- John Whiteside (cricketer) (1861–1946), English cricketer
- John Whiteside (curator) (1679–1729), English museum keeper, chaplain, philosopher, and astronomer
