= Kerr Whiteside =

Scottish footballer

Kerr Douglas Whiteside (17 September 1884 – 23 March 1919) was a Scottish footballer. He was born in Dundonald, Ayrshire on 17 September 1884 to parents William and Margaret (née Douglas) Whiteside. At the age of seven he fell from a wharf and was rescued from drowning by a seaman, James Durnan, who pulled Whiteside from the water.

His career began with local side Irvine Victoria whilst working as a blacksmith's labourer before he joined Manchester United in 1907; he made one appearance for the first team whilst at the club, away to Sheffield United, when he played at half back. In 1910 he joined Hurst and skippered the team for five seasons until the club stood down during World War I at the end of the 1914–15 season; he played 169 times for Hurst, scoring 24 goals, during which time the club won the Manchester League title (1912) and two Manchester Junior Cups (1911 & 1912).

Around the time he stopped playing, Whiteside began suffering from tuberculosis. The disease led to his early death on 23 March 1919. He was buried in Shewalton Cemetery in Irvine.
