= Thomas Whitesides =

Australian cricketer (1836–1919)

Personal information
- Born: 7 September 1836; Hobart, Tasmania, Australia
- Died: 24 September 1919 (aged 83); Hobart, Tasmania, Australia

Domestic team information
- Years: Team
- 1858-1869: Tasmania
- Source: Cricinfo, 6 January 2016

Thomas Whitesides (7 September 1836 – 24 September 1919) was an Australian cricketer. He played two first-class matches for Tasmania between 1858 and 1869.

== See also ==
- List of Tasmanian representative cricketers
