= Thomas Whiteside (journalist) =

American journalist (1918–1997)

Thomas Whiteside (April 21, 1918 – October 10, 1997) was an American journalist.

Born in Berwick-Upon-Tweed, he lived in Toronto, Canada before moving to the United States in 1940.

Whiteside studied at the University of Chicago. During World War II, he worked for the Office of War Propaganda, compiling reports on Axis propaganda. His work appeared in Newsweek, The New Republic, and The New Yorker.

Whiteside was instrumental in publicizing the damage of Agent Orange. According to Senator Hart, Whiteside's reporting on Agent Orange was the catalyst for the Congressional hearings regarding the chemical. By the end of the hearings, the Surgeon General had announced restrictions on its use, both domestically and in Vietnam. He led the charge in other revealing reporting, such as on the change in the tomato plant; his January 16, 1977 article on Tomatoes led to a Washington Post article for the broader public about ethylene gas being used on tomatoes sold to grocery stores to simulate ripening. His report covering the police violence against journalists and anti-war demonstrators alike at the 1968 Democratic Convention in Chicago continues to be relevant to reporters putting themselves in harm's way to tell the public not present at an event what truly happened.

He died in West Cornwall, Connecticut on October 10, 1997.

== Awards ==
- 1986 MacArthur Fellows Program

== Works ==
Most of Whiteside's published books are non-fiction works, with an activism focus. One book, Alone Through the Dark Sea is a collection of stories about lonely voyagers.

=== Published books ===
- The Relaxed Sell: A Humorous Account of Advertising in the U.S.A., Oxford University Press, 1954
- The Big Puff, Constable, 1955
- The Tunnel Under the Channel, Simon and Schuster, 1962
- Alone Through the Dark Sea, Braziller, 1964, ISBN 978-0-8076-0275-1
- An Agent in Place: the Wennerström Affair, Viking Press, 1966 (reprint, Ballantine Books, 1983, ISBN 978-0-345-30326-4)
- Twiggy and Justin, Farrar, Straus and Giroux, 1968, ISBN 978-0-374-27980-6
- Defoliation, Ballantine Books, 1970, ISBN 978-0-345-01870-0
- The Withering Rain: America's Herbicidal Folly, Dutton, 1971, ISBN 978-0-525-23575-0
- Selling Death: Cigarette Advertising and Public Health, Liveright, 1971, ISBN 978-0-87140-541-8
- The Investigation of Ralph Nader: General Motors vs One Determined Man, Pocket Books (1972), ISBN 978-0-671-78249-8
- Computer Capers: Tales of Electronic Thievery, Embezzlement, and Fraud, Ty Crowell Co., 1978, ISBN 978-0690017434, 1st printing. 2nd printing, 1979, ISBN 9780451617538. 3rd printing, ISBN 9780283985188.
- The Pendulum and the Toxic Cloud: The Course of Dioxin Contamination, Yale University Press (September 10, 1979), ISBN 978-0-300-02283-4
- The Blockbuster Complex: Conglomerates, Show Business, and Book Publishing, Wesleyan University Press, 1981, ISBN 978-0-8195-5057-6

=== New Yorker articles ===
- Onward and Upward With the Arts: "The Relaxed Sell", 26 May 1950.
- Where Are They Now?: "The Amphibious Pen", 9 February 1951.
- Onward and Upward With the Arts: "No Lobster Men from Neptune", 22 February 1952.
- The Talk of the Town: "After Ball Points, What?", 4 April 1952.
- That Was New York: "Better and Better.", 8 May 1953.
- Profiles: "The Communicator. Profile of Sylvester L. Weaver Jr." part one, 8 October 1954.
- Profiles: "The Communicator. Profile of Sylvester L. Weaver Jr." part two, 15 October 1954.
- Profiles: "Holy Smokestacks, What a Mess", 16 March 1956.
- The Talk of the Town: "Adjustment", 17 January 1958.
- Onward and Upward With the Arts: "Getting There First With Tranquility.", 25 April 1958.
- Profiles: "A Powerful Sense of His Duty", 5 December 1958.
- Profiles: "The Time is Twenty-One After.", 28 August 1959.
- Onward and Upward With the Arts: "The Selling Season: We'll Think About it, Dave", 17 June 1960.
- Onward and Upward With the Arts: "II – The Selling Season: The Massest Medium", 24 June 1960.
- The Talk of the Town: "Horwitt's Horologe", 13 January 1961.
- The Talk of the Town: "Testing Ringdoves", 7 April 1961.
- A Reporter at Large: "The Tunnel in the Chalk" part one, 10 November 1961.
- A Reporter at Large: "The Tunnel in the Chalk" part two, 70 November 1961.
- Comment: On Times Magazine's article on Robert J. Shriver, Peace Corpsman No. 1-A, 29 December 1961.
- Profiles: "The One-Ton Pencil", 9 February 1962.
- The Talk of the Town: "Telstar", 27 July 1962.
- The Talk of the Town: "In Homage", 21 September 1962.
- Annals of Migration: "Something Wrong with the Island.", 1 November 1963.
- A Reporter at Large: "A Cloud of Smoke", 22 November 1963.
- The Talk of the Town: "Brian Epstein, Beatle Man", 20 December 1963.
- The Talk of the Town: "Sister", 6 March 1964.
- Comment: On the wording of Kent Cigarettes' advertisement on the back of the Times, 6 March 1964.
- Annals of Business: "The Soap Conflict", 11 December 1964.
- The Talk of the Town: "Pad 19", 26 March 1965.
- The Talk of the Town: regarding a visit to Cape Kennedy to watch Roy Neal's CBS Broadcast of the launch, 26 March 1965.
- The Talk of the Town: "Heliport", 24 December 1965.
- Annals of Espionage: "An Agent in Place." part one, 18 March 1966.
- The Talk of the Town: "Anti-Heliporters", 25 March 1966.
- Annals of Espionage: "An Agent in Place." part two, 25 March 1966.
- Television: "Ooh, the Head!", 10 June 1966.
- The Talk of the Town: "Victorygraph", 28 October 1966.
- A Reporter at Large: "A Super New Thing", 27 October 1967.
- The Talk of the Town: "Nice Little Cab", 26 July 1968.
- Comment: On CBS' broadcast of Richard Nixon's arrival in Miami, 8 November 1968.
- The Talk of the Town: "Transfer", 4 July 1969.
- The Talk of the Town: "Superjet", 1 August 1969.
- Annals of Television: "The Man from Iron City.", 19 September 1969.
- The Talk of the Town: "Moratorium", 17 October 1969.
- A Reporter at Large: "Defoliation.", 30 January 1970.
- Dept. of Amplification. 6 March 1970.
- Dept. of Amplification. 12 June 1970.
- Dept. of Amplification. 26 June 1970.
- Annals of Advertising: "Cutting Down", 11 December 1970.
- Dept. of Amplification. 6 August 1971.
- The Talk of the Town: "Tea with Twiggy", 10 December 1971.
- Comment: On the Dept. of Defense withdrawing Agent Orange from being handed over to the South Vietnamese, 11 February 1972.
- Profiles: "I – A Countervailing Force", 30 September 1973.
- Profiles: "II – A Countervailing Force", 7 October 1973.
- Profiles: "Dashin' About", 17 February 1974.
- Comment: On the Academy of Sciences report about Agent Orange and on the defoliant's use in Vietnam, 17 March 1974.
- A Reporter at Large: "Smoking Still", 10 November 1974.
- Annals of Television: "Shaking the Tree", 9 March 1975.
- A Reporter at Large: "Anything Adverse?", 13 April 1975.
- Onward and Upward With the Arts: "Din-Din', 24 October 1976.
- A Reporter at Large: "Tomatoes", 16 January 1977.
- The Talk of the Town: "Fireplace Man", 24 April 1977.
- The Talk of the Town: "Frost vs Nixon: A Trial on TV", 8 May 1977.
- Comment: On R.J. Reynolds new brand "Real" and the ad campaign for it. 19 June 1977.
- A Reporter at Large: "The Pendulum and the Toxic Cloud", 17 July 1977.
- Annals of Crime: "Dead Souls in the Computer – I", 14 August 1977.
- The Talk of the Town: "Encyclopedists", 25 September 1977.
- The Talk of the Town: "Digitizing", 6 November 1977.
- Dept. of Amplification. 4 December 1977.
- A Reporter at Large: "Contaminated", 27 August 1978.
- Comment: On dioxin contamination downstream of Dow Chemical in MI. 10 December 1978.
- The Talk of the Town: Letter. 8 April 1979.
- Dept. of Amplification. 15 April 1979.
- Comment: On the use of "risk-benefit assessment" where it concerns companies benefiting over the health of the public. 13 May 1979.
- The Talk of the Town: "Inputs", 23 March 1980.
- Onward and Upward With the Arts: "I – The Blockbuster Complex", 21 September 1980.
- Onward and Upward With the Arts: "II – The Blockbuster Complex", 28 September 1980.
- Onward and Upward With the Arts: "III – The Blockbuster Complex", 5 October 1980.
- Onward and Upward With the Arts: "I – Cable", 12 May 1985.
- Onward and Upward With the Arts: "I – Cable", 19 May 1985.
- Onward and Upward With the Arts: "I – Cable", 26 May 1985.
- Television: "Soviet TV", 8 September 1985.
- Onward and Upward With the Arts: "Standups", 24 November 1985.
- Annals of Business: "C.E.O., T.V.", 28 June 1987.
- Annals of the Cold War: "I – The Yellow-Rain Complex", 3 February 1991.
- Annals of the Cold War: "II – The Yellow-Rain Complex", 10 February 1991.

=== Columbia Journalism Review ===
- "Corridor of Mirrors: the television editorial process, Chicago", Winter 1968–1969. Reprinted December 20, 2021.

=== Unpublished papers ===
Columbia University Libraries has a collection of papers once belonging to Whiteside. The bulk of it is professional in nature: research, photographs, and notes for his articles and books. There are, however, personal papers, dating from 1940 through 1995 as well.
