= Evening Times Champions Cup =

- Organiser(s): Scottish Junior Football Association (SJFA)
- Founded: 1896; 130 years ago
- Region: Greater Glasgow (1896–1927) Central Belt (1931–2002) West of Scotland (2002–)
- Teams: 5 (since 2012–13)
- Current champions: Beith Juniors (1st title)
- Most championships: Pollok (overall, 11 titles)

The Evening Times Champions Cup, the name of the current version, is an association football trophy for clubs of the Junior level in the western part of Scotland. Sponsored by the Glasgow-based newspaper the Evening Times (now branded as Glasgow Times) since its inception, the trophy has been competed for since 1896 and has been recommissioned under many different guises throughout its history. It was originally awarded annually as a league championship trophy, but has latterly been contested in a Super Cup style format for winners of various league divisions and local cups in the region.

== Glasgow Junior League (1896–1927) ==
The original purpose of the trophy was that it would be presented to the winners of the Glasgow Junior League since the inception of competition in 1895–96.

The inaugural winners of the trophy Cambuslang Hibernian would later have its name inscribed on the trophy.

Season	Winner	Runner-up
1895–96	Cambuslang Hibernian	Strathclyde
1896–97	Strathclyde	Cambuslang Hibernian
1897–98	Parkhead	Rutherglen Glencairn
1898–99	Rutherglen Glencairn	Cambuslang Hibernian
1899–1900	Vale of Clyde	Glasgow Perthshire
1900–01	Maryhill and Parkhead	
1900–01	Championship play-off match finished 2–2, trophy shared.	
1901–02	Rutherglen Glencairn	Parkhead
1902–03	Parkhead	Petershill
1903–04	Maryhill	Petershill
1904–05	Maryhill	Strathclyde
1905–06	Ashfield	Strathclyde
1906–07	Ashfield	Maryhill
1907–08	Ashfield	Clydebank Juniors
1908–09	Ashfield	Strathclyde
1909–10	Ashfield	Kirkintilloch Rob Roy
1910–11	Cambuslang Rangers	Strathclyde
1911–12	Cambuslang Rangers	Vale of Clyde
1912–13	Vale of Clyde	Glasgow Perthshire
1913–14	Benburb	Cambuslang Rangers
1914–15	Cambuslang Rangers	Vale of Clyde
1915–16	Cambuslang Rangers	Clydebank Juniors
1916–17	Parkhead	Petershill
1916–17	Championship play-off match was 1–1, replay was 3–2, both at Cathkin Park.	
1917–18	Vale of Clyde	Ashfield
1918–19	Rutherglen Glencairn	Ashfield
1919–20	Vale of Clyde	Petershill
1920–21	Ashfield	Benburb
1921–22	Rutherglen Glencairn	Parkhead
1922–23	Strathclyde	Shettleston
1923–24	Shettleston	Rutherglen Glencairn
1924–25	St Roch's	Parkhead
1925–26	St Roch's	Strathclyde
1925–26	Championship play off match was 4–4, replay was 3–1.	
1926–27	Shettleston	Strathclyde

== Scottish Intermediate League (1927–31) ==
After the intermediate dispute of 1925, the trophy was awarded to the champions of the breakaway Scottish Intermediate League from 1927–28.

The destination of the trophy was determined in a play-off match between the Eastern and Western divisional winners.

Season	Winner	Score	Runner-up	Venue
1927–28	Baillieston (Note: Eastern Division champions.)	1–1	Ashfield (Note: Western Division champions.)	
1927–28	Baillieston	2–1	Ashfield	
1928–29	Ashfield	1–0	Baillieston	
1929–30	Clydebank Juniors	2–2	Bridgeton Waverley	Hawthorn Park
1929–30	Clydebank Juniors	1–1	Bridgeton Waverley	Hawthorn Park
1929–30	Clydebank Juniors	3–2	Bridgeton Waverley	Hawthorn Park
1930–31	Bridgeton Waverley	2–0	Yoker Athletic	

== Central Junior Football League (1931–2002) ==
=== 1931–1968 ===
As of 1931–32, the overall winners of Central Junior League were awarded the trophy.

The trophy was presented to the league champions in seasons with a single division. The Eastern and Western (or 'A' and 'B') division winners would commence to a play-off for the trophy. Semi-finals were required if there were seasons with more than two divisions.

Season	Winner	Score	Runner-up	Venue
1931–32	Shawfield	3–2	Yoker Athletic	
1932–33	Petershill	1–0	Strathclyde	
1933–34	Rutherglen Glencairn	2–1	Yoker Athletic	
1934–35	Clydebank Juniors	N/A	Renfrew	(Note: The Central League winners were the Division A Champions in 1934–35 and 1935–36. No play-off system needed because there was a single division.)
1935–36	Blantyre Victoria	N/A	Morton Juniors	(Note: The Central League winners were the Division A Champions in 1934–35 and 1935–36. No play-off system needed because there was a single division.)
1936–37	Arthurlie	1–0	Shawfield	
1937–38	Morton Juniors	4–2	Cambuslang Rangers	
1938–39	Petershill	3–1	Cambuslang Rangers	
1939–40	Petershill	3–1	Strathclyde	
1940–41	Clydebank Juniors	3–1	Blantyre Victoria	
1941–42	Clydebank Juniors	4–0	Maryhill Harp	
1942–43	Rutherglen Glencairn	2–0	Benburb	
1943–44	St Roch's	2–1	Clydebank Juniors	Shawfield Stadium
1944–45	Clydebank Juniors	4–3	Petershill	Shawfield Stadium
1945–46	Arthurlie	2–1	Blantyre Celtic	Shawfield Stadium
1946–47	Vale of Leven	2–0	Petershill	
1947–48	Kilsyth Rangers	2–1	Pollok	
1948–49	Blantyre Celtic	1–1	Clydebank Juniors	
1948–49	Blantyre Celtic	3–1	Clydebank Juniors	Shawfield Stadium
1949–50	Clydebank Juniors	3–0	Petershill	
1950–51	Duntocher Hibernian	1–1	Benburb	Shawfield Stadium
1950–51	Duntocher Hibernian	1–0	Benburb	Shawfield Stadium
1951–52	Petershill	3–0	Bellshill Athletic	Shawfield Stadium
1952–53	Ashfield	3–2	Clydebank Juniors	Shawfield Stadium
1953–54	Kilsyth Rangers	6–0	Benburb	Shawfield Stadium
1954–55	Ashfield	4–3	Petershill	Shawfield Stadium
1955–56	Petershill	4–0	Parkhead	Shawfield Stadium
1956–57	Kilsyth Rangers	3–0	St Roch's	Shawfield Stadium
1957–58	Duntocher Hibernian	5–3	Parkhead	Shawfield Stadium
1958–59	Johnstone Burgh	5–3	Ashfield	Shawfield Stadium
1959–60	Baillieston	2–0	Shettleston	Shawfield Stadium
1960–61	Greenock	4–2	Maryhill Harp	Shawfield Stadium
1961–62	Kirkintilloch Rob Roy	3–0	Shettleston	Shawfield Stadium
1962–63	Kirkintilloch Rob Roy		Shettleston	
1963–64	Petershill	1–1	Kirkintilloch Rob Roy	Shawfield Stadium
1963–64	Petershill	4–1	Kirkintilloch Rob Roy	Shawfield Stadium
1964–65	Johnstone Burgh	2–1	Shettleston	Firhill Park
1965–66	Greenock	3–2	Cambuslang Rangers	Firhill Park
1966–67	Rutherglen Glencairn	2–0	Cambuslang Rangers	Firhill Park
1967–68	Johnstone Burgh	3–1	Petershill	Firhill Park

=== 1968–1979 ===
The Lanarkshire regional league was absorbed into a new Central region set-up as part of a major restructure ahead of season 1968–69.

The winners of new three-division setup, with Lanarkshire clubs included, would progress to a play-off system for the trophy. The 'B' and 'C' Division winners competed for place in the final against the 'A' Division winners.

Season	Winner	Score	Runner-up	Venue
1968–69	Petershill (Note: Team were also Division A winners.)	1–1	Pollok (Note: Team were also Division B winners.)	
1968–69	Petershill	2–2	Pollok	
1968–69	Petershill	3–1	Pollok	
1969–70	Vale of Leven	3–3	Renfrew	
1969–70	Vale of Leven	4–1	Renfrew	
1970–71	Cambuslang Rangers	3–0	Cumbernauld United	Petershill Park
1971–72	Cambuslang Rangers	6–0	St Roch's (Note: Team were also Division C winners.)	Petershill Park
1972–73	Cambuslang Rangers	4–1	St Roch's (Note: St Roch's were also B Division winners.)	Newlandsfield Park
1973–74	Cambuslang Rangers	1–1	Maryhill	Petershill Park
1973–74	The final finished 1–1 (aet). Rangers won 3–2 on penalties.			Petershill Park
1974–75	East Kilbride Thistle	4–3	Larkhall Thistle	Greenfield Park
1975–76	East Kilbride Thistle	3–1	Port Glasgow	Somervell Park
1976–77	Glasgow Perthshire	2–1	Shettleston	Petershill Park
1977–78	Cumbernauld United	1–0	Lesmahagow	Somervell Park
1978–79	Pollok		Port Glasgow	

== Evening Times Cup Winners' Cup (1979–2012) ==
=== 1979–1982 ===
Rebranded as the Evening Times Cup Winners' Cup, the trophy was decided in a play-off system between the winners of Division A, Central League Cup, Sectional League Cup, and McLeod Trophy.

Season	Winner	Score	Runner-up	Venue
1979–80	Pollok (Note: Team were also Central League Cup winners.)			
1980–81	Pollok			
1981–82	Lesmahagow			

=== 1982–2002 ===
As well as the Sectional League Cup and Central League Cup winners, entry to the compensation was expanded to include all divisional champions of the Central region.

Season	Winner	Score	Runner-up	Venue
1982–83	East Kilbride Thistle (Note: Team were also Central League Sectional Cup winners.)			
1983–84	Pollok			
1984–85	Pollok (Note: Team were also Central League Premier Division winners.)			
1985–86	Pollok			
1986–87	Arthurlie			
1987–88	Pollok			
1988–89	Arthurlie			
1989–90	Vale of Clyde			
1990–91	Cambuslang Rangers (Note: Team were also Central League First Division winners.)			
1991–92	Petershill			
1992–93	Lesmahagow			
1993–94	Arthurlie			
1994–95	No competition			
1995–96	Maryhill			
1996–97	Maryhill			
1997–98	Maryhill			
1998–99	Dunipace (Note: Team were also Central League Second Division winners.)			
1999–00	Port Glasgow			
2000–01	Arthurlie			
2001–02	Johnstone Burgh			

=== 2002–2012 ===
Another major restructure took place in 2002, with the Ayrshire and Central regional leagues merged to create the new SJFA West Region setup.

Entry was now permitted to the five divisional champions and five winners of the cup competitions of the West setup.

Season	Winner	Score	Runner-up	Venue
2002–03	Kilsyth Rangers (Note: Team were SJFA West Region Central District First Division winners.)			
2003–04	Pollok (Note: Team were SJFA West Region Premiership and Central Sectional League Cup winners.)			
2004–05	Lanark United (Note: Team were SJFA West Region Central District Second Division winners.)			
2005–06	Irvine Meadow XI (Note: Team were SJFA West Region Ayrshire District Division winners.)			
2006–07	Pollok			
2007–08	Pollok (Note: Team were SJFA West Region Super League Premier Division / Premiership winners.)	3–1	Cumnock (Note: Team were Ayrshire Region Junior Cup winners.)	
2008–09	Irvine Meadow XI	1–0	Pollok (Note: Team were Central Junior League Cup winners.)	Newlandsfield Park
2009–10	Irvine Meadow XI (Note: Team were West of Scotland Junior Cup winners.)	4–0	Kilbirnie Ladeside (Note: Team were Ayrshire Junior League Cup winners.)	
2010–11	Arthurlie	1–0	Shotts Bon Accord (Note: Team were Central Sectional League Cup winners.)	Newlandsfield Park
2011–12	Ashfield	1–0	Irvine Meadow XI (Note: Team were SJFA West Region Super League Premier Division / Premiership and West of Scotland Junior Cup winners.)	Newlandsfield Park

== Evening Times Champions Cup (2012–) ==
As of 2012–13, it was renamed the Evening Times Champions Cup. Entry into the competition was restricted to the five league winners of the West region.

As of 2018–19, the competition would be moved to the beginning of the following season.

Season	Winner	Score	Runner-up	Venue
2012–13	Auchinleck Talbot	3–0	Hurlford United (Note: Team were SJFA West Region Super League First Division / Championship winners.)	
2013–14	Auchinleck Talbot	7–0	Neilston	
2014–15	Pollok	3–1	Blantyre Victoria	Newlandsfield Park
2015–16	Auchinleck Talbot	5–2	Renfrew	
2016–17	Glenafton Athletic	2–0	Glasgow Perthshire	New Tinto Park
2017–18	Beith Juniors	4–1	Petershill	New Tinto Park
2018–19	Competition moved to start of following season.			
2019–20	Final between Auchinleck Talbot and Gartcairn was scrapped.			
2020–21	Not held due to the COVID-19 pandemic.			
