= West of Scotland Junior Cup =

- Organising body: Scottish Junior Football Association (West Region)
- Founded: 1931; 94 years ago
- Abolished: 2020; 5 years ago
- Region: West of Scotland (Note: Ayrshire, Greater Glasgow, Lanarkshire, Renfrewshire)
- Last champions: Beith Juniors (2019, 4th title)
- Most successful club(s): Auchinleck Talbot (12 titles)

The West of Scotland Junior Challenge Cup was an annual Scottish football competition played in a one-leg knockout format (played at 'home' team grounds as drawn, until the final at a neutral venue), organised by the West Region of the Scottish Junior Football Association.

== History ==
The tournament had its origins in the Intermediate dispute of the 1920s, in which most of the leading Junior clubs in the west of Scotland left the Scottish Junior Football Association and formed their own Scottish Intermediate Football Association in 1927, which organised new leagues and cups similar to those run by the SJFA, including the Scottish Intermediate Cup as a replication of the flagship Junior competition, the Scottish Junior Cup. The dispute was resolved in 1931, the rebel clubs rejoined the SJFA and the competitions were continued, with the Scottish Intermediate Cup re-designated the West of Scotland Cup, below the Scottish Cup in the hierarchy. Initially it was open only to the clubs which had been in the intermediates (the historic Glasgow League, now replaced by the Central League, and the Western League in northern Ayrshire which had existed both before and after the dispute) but by 1949 this had been extended to other clubs which had joined those leagues – notably a group in southern Ayrshire – and those in the Lanarkshire League which had continued during the dispute, with a total of 82 clubs entering the 1949–50 edition. The format remained almost unchanged from then on, with mergers in the leagues (Lanarkshire joining Central in 1968, and Central and Ayrshire merging as West Region in 2002) not affecting involvement in the West Cup.

From 2003 until 2012, the winners qualified for the Evening Times Cup Winners Cup along with the other league and cup winners in the region (this thereafter changed to a 'Champions Cup' format for league divisional winners only).

The last winners were Beith Juniors who defeated Kirkintilloch Rob Roy in a Penalty shoot-out (association football) at the 2019 final played at Meadow Park in Irvine; Beith were also finalists in 2018, losing on penalties to Hurlford United at the same venue. The 2020 competition was never completed due to the COVID-19 pandemic.

After the entire West Region joined the senior pyramid structure in 2020, a new league competition, the West of Scotland League, was created to accommodate them. A new West of Scotland League Cup (the spiritual successor of the West of Scotland Junior Cup, but not officially linked to it) was also introduced – its first winners were Hurlford United in 2022.

The Junior competition should not be confused with the West Of Scotland Amateur Cup operated by the Scottish Amateur Football Association, encompassing a similar geographical area and occupying a similar prominence below the Scottish Amateur Cup, nor with a West of Scotland Cup for Under-21 teams operated by the Scottish Youth FA.

== Finals ==
- (R) = Won after a replay/2nd replay.
- (aet) = Result after extra time.
- (P) = Won on penalties.

| Season | Winner | Score | Runner-up | League |
|---|---|---|---|---|
| 1927–28 | Scottish Intermediate Cup | | | |
| 1928–29 | Scottish Intermediate Cup | | | |
| 1929–30 | Scottish Intermediate Cup | | | |
| 1930–31 | Scottish Intermediate Cup | | | |
| 1931–32 | Irvine Meadow | 2–0 | Kirkintilloch Rob Roy | Western |
| 1932–33 | Strathclyde | 3–1 | Kirkintilloch Rob Roy | Central (I) |
| 1933–34 | Wishaw Juniors | 3–1 | Kirkintilloch Rob Roy | Lanarkshire |
| 1934–35 | Ardrossan Winton Rovers | 2–2 | Arthurlie | Western |
| 1934–35 | Ardrossan Winton Rovers | 4–0 (R) | Arthurlie | Western |
| 1935–36 | Bridgeton Waverley | 1–1 | Vale of Clyde | Central (I) |
| 1935–36 | Bridgeton Waverley | 3–2 (R) | Vale of Clyde | Central (I) |
| 1936–37 | Parkhead | 2–0 | Petershill | Central (I) |
| 1937–38 | St Anthony's | 3–0 | Shieldmuir Celtic | Central (I) |
| 1938–39 | Shawfield | 2–0 | Clydebank Juniors | Central (I) |
| 1939–40 | Glasgow Perthshire | 2–1 | Morton Juniors | Central (I) |
| 1940–41 | Benburb | 3–1 | Blantyre Victoria | Central (I) |
| 1941–42 | Benburb | 2–0 | Glasgow Perthshire | Central (I) |
| 1942–43 | Arthurlie | 2–1 | Rutherglen Glencairn | Central (I) |
| 1943–44 | Blantyre Victoria | 3–1 | Yoker Athletic | Central (I) |
| 1944–45 | Pollok | 3–3 | Glasgow Perthshire | Central (I) |
| 1944–45 | Pollok | 6–1 (R) | Glasgow Perthshire | Central (I) |
| 1945–46 | Saltcoats Victoria | 3–1 | Cambuslang Rangers | Western |
| 1946–47 | Saltcoats Victoria | 4–1 | Kilbirnie Ladeside | Western |
| 1947–48 | Auchinleck Talbot | 1–1 | Blantyre Celtic | Western |
| 1947–48 | Auchinleck Talbot | 1–0 (R) | Blantyre Celtic | Western |
| 1948–49 | Newarthill Hearts | 2–1 | Auchinleck Talbot | Lanarkshire |
| 1949–50 | Clydebank Juniors | 3–1 | Dunipace | Central (I) |
| 1950–51 | Irvine Meadow | 2–1 | Wishaw Juniors | Western |
| 1951–52 | Petershill | 2–0 | Irvine Victoria | Central (I) |
| 1952–53 | Baillieston Juniors | 2–1 | Wishaw Juniors | Central (I) |
| 1953–54 | Kilsyth Rangers | 1–0 | Duntocher Hibernian | Central (I) |
| 1954–55 | Douglas Water Thistle | 3–3 | Maryhill Harp | Lanarkshire |
| 1954–55 | Douglas Water Thistle | 3–2 (R) | Maryhill Harp | Lanarkshire |
| 1955–56 | Irvine Meadow | 4–1 | Clydebank Juniors | Western |
| 1956–57 | Lesmahagow | 2–1 | Baillieston Juniors | Lanarkshire |
| 1957–58 | Petershill | 3–1 | Beith Juniors | Central (I) |
| 1958–59 | Johnstone Burgh | 1–0 | Kilsyth Rangers | Central (I) |
| 1959–60 | Cambuslang Rangers | 2–0 | Thorniewood United | Central (I) |
| 1960–61 (Note: 2-legged final played.) | Kirkintilloch Rob Roy | 0–0 (L1) | Cambuslang Rangers | Central (I) |
| 1960–61 | Kirkintilloch Rob Roy | 5–4 (L2) | Cambuslang Rangers | Central (I) |
| 1961–62 | Irvine Meadow | 2–2 (L1) | Greenock Juniors | Western |
| 1961–62 | Irvine Meadow | 4–0 (L2) | Greenock Juniors | Western |
| 1962–63 | Kirkintilloch Rob Roy | 3–2 (L1) | Neilston | Central (I) |
| 1962–63 | Kirkintilloch Rob Roy | 4–0 (L2) | Neilston | Central (I) |
| 1963–64 | Shotts Bon Accord | 3–2 (L1) | Cambuslang Rangers | Lanarkshire |
| 1963–64 | Shotts Bon Accord | 2–2 (L2) | Cambuslang Rangers | Lanarkshire |
| 1964–65 | Johnstone Burgh | 1–2 (L1) | Beith Juniors | Central (I) |
| 1964–65 | Johnstone Burgh | 4–3 (L2) | Beith Juniors | Central (I) |
| 1964–65 | Johnstone Burgh | 1–0 (R) | Beith Juniors | Central (I) |
| 1965–66 (Note: 2-legged final played, but only aggregate score recorded.) | Beith Juniors | 6–4 (AGG) | Cambuslang Rangers | Western |
| 1966–67 | Beith Juniors | 5–3 (AGG) | Greenock Juniors | Western |
| 1967–68 | Kilsyth Rangers | 1–2 (L1) | Kilbirnie Ladeside | Central (I) |
| 1967–68 | Kilsyth Rangers | 4–1 (L2) | Kilbirnie Ladeside | Central (I) |
| 1968–69 | Petershill | 5–1 | Irvine Meadow | Central (II) |
| 1969–70 | Irvine Meadow | 0–0 | Greenock Juniors | Ayrshire |
| 1969–70 | Irvine Meadow | 2–1 (R) | Greenock Juniors | Ayrshire |
| 1970–71 | Irvine Meadow | 1–0 | Cambuslang Rangers | Ayrshire |
| 1971–72 | Cambuslang Rangers | 2–1 | Kilbirnie Ladeside | Central (II) |
| 1972–73 | Cambuslang Rangers | 4–2 | Irvine Meadow | Central (II) |
| 1973–74 | East Kilbride Thistle | 3–1 | Cambuslang Rangers | Central (II) |
| 1974–75 | Shettleston | 3–2 | Lesmahagow | Central (II) |
| 1975–76 | Arthurlie | 1–1 | East Kilbride Thistle | Central (II) |
| 1975–76 | Arthurlie | 1–0 (R) | East Kilbride Thistle | Central (II) |
| 1976–77 | Lanark United | 2–0 | Petershill | Central (II) |
| 1977–78 | Arthurlie | 1–0 | Kirkintilloch Rob Roy | Central (II) |
| 1978–79 | Auchinleck Talbot | 4–0 | Cumnock Juniors | Ayrshire |
| 1979–80 | Auchinleck Talbot | 2–1 | Kirkintilloch Rob Roy | Ayrshire |
| 1980–81 | Auchinleck Talbot | 1–1 | Cumnock Juniors | Ayrshire |
| 1980–81 | Auchinleck Talbot | 1–0 (R) | Cumnock Juniors | Ayrshire |
| 1981–82 | Auchinleck Talbot | 3–0 | Rutherglen Glencairn | Ayrshire |
| 1982–83 | Benburb | 2–2 (P) | Port Glasgow | Central (II) |
| 1983–84 | Auchinleck Talbot | 3–2 | Cumnock Juniors | Ayrshire |
| 1984–85 | Auchinleck Talbot | 3–2 | Glenafton Athletic | Ayrshire |
| 1985–86 | Auchinleck Talbot | 3–2 | Pollok | Ayrshire |
| 1986–87 | Pollok | 3–2 | Auchinleck Talbot | Central (II) |
| 1987–88 | Auchinleck Talbot | 2–1 | Annbank United | Ayrshire |
| 1988–89 | Auchinleck Talbot | 1–0 | Shotts Bon Accord | Ayrshire |
| 1989–90 | Irvine Meadow | 4–1 | Larkhall Thistle | Ayrshire |
| 1990–91 | Largs Thistle | 1–0 | Renfrew | Ayrshire |
| 1991–92 | Pollok | 1–0 | Beith Juniors | Central (II) |
| 1992–93 | Shettleston | 2–0 | Lesmahagow | Central (II) |
| 1993–94 | Kilwinning Rangers | 2–0 | Shettleston | Ayrshire |
| 1994–95 | Shettleston | 1–1 (P) | Pollok | Central (II) |
| 1995–96 | Petershill | 2–1 | Maryhill | Central (II) |
| 1996–97 | Arthurlie | 5–0 | Irvine Meadow | Central (II) |
| 1997–98 | Pollok | 3–1 | Petershill | Central (II) |
| 1998–99 | Kilwinning Rangers | 2–1 | Arthurlie | Ayrshire |
| 1999–2000 | Pollok | 2–1 | Glenafton Athletic | Central (II) |
| 2000–01 | Maryhill | 1–0 | Auchinleck Talbot | Central (II) |
| 2001–02 | Benburb | 3–2 | Johnstone Burgh | Central (II) |
| 2002–03 | Glenafton Athletic | 4–2 | Bellshill Athletic | West (Ayrshire) |
| 2003–04 | Maryhill | 3–1 | Bellshill Athletic | West (Central) |
| 2004–05 | Troon | 4–3 | Arthurlie | West (Ayrshire) |
| 2005–06 | Glenafton Athletic | 1–1 (P) | Maryhill | West (Ayrshire) |
| 2006–07 | Petershill | 2–1 | Kilbirnie Ladeside | West (Central) |
| 2007–08 | Kilbirnie Ladeside | 5–1 | Pollok | West (Ayrshire) |
| 2008–09 | Beith Juniors | 2–1 | Auchinleck Talbot | West (Ayrshire) |
| 2009–10 | Irvine Meadow | 1–0 | Kirkintilloch Rob Roy | West (Ayrshire) |
| 2010–11 | Arthurlie | 1–0 | Pollok | West (Central) |
| 2011–12 | Irvine Meadow | 2–0 | Ashfield | West (Ayrshire) |
| 2012–13 | Glenafton Athletic | 2–2 (P) | Glasgow Perthshire | West (Ayrshire) |
| 2013–14 | Auchinleck Talbot | 2–0 | Troon | West (Ayrshire) |
| 2014–15 | Arthurlie | 4–2 | Kilwinning Rangers | West (Central) |
| 2015–16 | Auchinleck Talbot | 2–0 | Hurlford United | West (Ayrshire) |
| 2016–17 | Pollok | 2–2 (P) | Cumnock Juniors | West (Central) |
| 2017–18 | Hurlford United | 2–2 (P) | Beith Juniors | West (Ayrshire) |
| 2018–19 | Beith Juniors | 1–1 (P) | Kirkintilloch Rob Roy | West (Ayrshire) |
| 2019–20 | Cancelled due to the COVID-19 pandemic | | | |

== Club Performance ==
| Club | Winner | Runner-up | League (when winner) (Note: SJFA league in which the club was playing each time they won the West of Scotland Cup.) |
|---|---|---|---|
| Auchinleck Talbot | 12 | 4 | Western (1); Ayrshire (9); West (Ayrshire) (2) |
| Irvine Meadow | 9 | 3 (Note: In addition, runners-up in Scottish Intermediate Cup on 1 occasion.) | Western (4); Ayrshire (3); West (Ayrshire) (2) |
| Arthurlie | 6 | 3 | Central (I) (1); Central (II) (3); West (Central) (2) |
| Pollok | 6 | 3 | Central (I) (1); Central (II) (4); West (Central) (1) |
| Petershill | 5 | 3 | Central (I) (2); Central (II) (2); West (Central) (1) |
| Beith Juniors | 4 | 4 | Western (2); West (Ayrshire) (2) |
| Benburb | 4 | 0 | Central (I) (2); Central (II) (1); West (Central) (1) |
| Cambuslang Rangers | 3 | 6 | Central (I) (1); Central (II) (2) |
| Glenafton Athletic | 3 | 2 | West (Ayrshire) (3) |
| Shettleston | 3 | 1 | Central (II) (3) |
| Kirkintilloch Rob Roy | 2 | 7 | Central (I) (2) |
| Maryhill | 2 | 2 | Central (II) (1); West (Central) (1) |
| Johnstone Burgh | 2 | 1 | Central (I) (2) |
| Kilsyth Rangers | 2 | 1 | Central (I) (2) |
| Kilwinning Rangers | 2 | 1 | Ayrshire (2) |
| Saltcoats Victoria | 2 | 0 | Western (2) |
| Kilbirnie Ladeside | 1 | 4 | West (Ayrshire) (1) |
| Glasgow Perthshire | 1 | 3 | Central (I) (1) |
| Clydebank Juniors | 1 (Note: In addition, winners of Scottish Intermediate Cup on 1 occasion.) | 2 | Central (I) (1) |
| Wishaw Juniors | 1 | 2 | Lanarkshire |
| Lesmahagow | 1 | 2 | Lanarkshire |
| Hurlford United | 1 | 1 | West (Ayrshire) (1) |
| Troon | 1 | 1 | West (Ayrshire) (1) |
| East Kilbride Thistle | 1 | 1 | Central (II) (1) |
| Blantyre Victoria | 1 | 1 | Central (I) (1) |
| Shotts Bon Accord | 1 | 1 | Lanarkshire |
| Baillieston Juniors | 1 | 1 | Central (I) (1) |
| Bridgeton Waverley | 1 | 0 | Central (I) (1) |
| Ardrossan Winton Rovers | 1 | 0 | Western (1) |
| Douglas Water Thistle | 1 | 0 | Lanarkshire |
| Largs Thistle | 1 | 0 | Ayrshire (1) |
| Newarthill Hearts | 1 | 0 | Lanarkshire |
| Parkhead | 1 | 0 | Central (I) (1) |
| Shawfield | 1 | 0 | Central (I) (1) |
| St Anthony's | 1 | 0 | Central (I) (1) |
| Strathclyde | 1 | 0 | Central (I) (1) |
| Greenock Juniors | 0 | 3 | N/A |
| Cumnock Juniors | 0 | 3 | N/A |
| Bellshill Athletic | 0 | 2 | N/A |
| Rutherglen Glencairn | 0 | 2 | N/A |
| Ashfield | 0 (Note: Winners of Scottish Intermediate Cup on 2 occasions.) | 1 | N/A |
| Yoker Athletic | 0 | 1 | N/A |
| Annbank United | 0 | 1 | N/A |
| Blantyre Celtic | 0 | 1 | N/A |
| Dunipace | 0 | 1 | N/A |
| Duntocher Hibernian | 0 | 1 | N/A |
| Larkhall Thistle | 0 | 1 | N/A |
| Irvine Victoria | 0 | 1 | N/A |
| Morton Juniors | 0 | 1 | N/A |
| Maryhill Harp | 0 | 1 | N/A |
| Shieldmuir Celtic | 0 | 1 | N/A |
| Neilston Juniors | 0 | 1 | N/A |
| Port Glasgow | 0 | 1 | N/A |
| Renfrew | 0 | 1 | N/A |
| Thorniewood United | 0 | 1 | N/A |
| Vale of Clyde | 0 | 1 | N/A |
