= Glasgow Junior Football League =

Scottish football league

The Glasgow Junior Football League (GJL) was a football league competition operated under the Scottish Junior Football Association between 1895 and 1927. As its name suggests, it was primarily for teams in the Glasgow area, but did include teams from towns outside the city; conversely, other leagues existed concurrently (such as the Scottish Junior Football League) and some teams based in Glasgow played in those.

The league – the champions of which were awarded the Evening Times Trophy – was seen as one of the strongest in Scotland, with its clubs winning or reaching the final of the national knockout competition, the Scottish Junior Cup, several times. Membership varied, with mergers involving other leagues occurring on various occasions and individual teams being enticed to join the GJL from those leagues.

Having continued through World War I, the GJL was dissolved in 1927 when the intermediate dispute occurred; however its members (and other clubs) formed the Scottish Intermediate Football League which was contested for four years. In 1931, the Central Junior Football League was formed, with notes from its 1932 AGM stating that it was the 32nd such meeting, suggesting that it was considered a continuation of the pre-1927 GJL. This setup continued until 1968 when the Central League merged with the long-running Lanarkshire Junior Football League as the Central Region, and eventually 2002 the Ayrshire Junior Football League (many of whose clubs had also been involved in the intermediate dispute of the 1920s, although they played in a separate division) joined to create the Scottish Junior Football Association, West Region.

Two of the clubs who participated in the first season of the Glasgow Junior League in 1895–96 – Maryhill and Vale of Clyde – played in the SJFA West in 2019–20, and others who joined in the 19th century (Ashfield, Glasgow Perthshire, Petershill and Rutherglen Glencairn) also survived into the 21st. At the end of that season – which was curtailed due to the coronavirus pandemic – all 63 West Region clubs left the SJFA setup to join a new West of Scotland Football League in the Senior pyramid, bringing 125 years of Junior league football in the region (including the intermediate years) to an end.

== Champions ==
Key:

Club also won the Scottish Junior Cup (doubles in **bold**).
Club were also runners-up in the Scottish Junior Cup

Season	Winner	Runner-up	Other member in Scottish Cup final
1895–96	**Cambuslang Hibernian**	Strathclyde	Parkhead
1896–97	**Strathclyde**	Cambuslang Hibernian	
1897–98	Parkhead	Rutherglen Glencairn	
1898–99	Rutherglen Glencairn	Cambuslang Hibernian	Parkhead
1899–1900	Vale of Clyde	Glasgow Perthshire	**Maryhill**
1900–01	Maryhill / Parkhead (shared)		Maryhill
1901–02	**Rutherglen Glencairn**	Parkhead	Maryhill
1902–03	**Parkhead**	Petershill	
1903–04	Maryhill	Petershill	Vale of Clyde
1904–05	Maryhill	Strathclyde	Ashfield
1905–06	Ashfield	Strathclyde	
1906–07	Ashfield	Maryhill	Strathclyde
1907–08	Ashfield	Clydebank Juniors	(Note: GJL teams did not enter in 1907–08 due to a dispute with the SJFA.)
1908–09	Ashfield	Strathclyde	
1909–10	**Ashfield**	Kirkintilloch Rob Roy	
1910–11	Cambuslang Rangers	Strathclyde	Petershill
1911–12	Cambuslang Rangers	Vale of Clyde	Petershill
1912–13	Vale of Clyde	Glasgow Perthshire	
1913–14	Benburb	Cambuslang Rangers	Ashfield
1914–15	Cambuslang Rangers	Vale of Clyde	Parkhead
1915–16	Cambuslang Rangers	Clydebank Juniors	Petershill
1916–17	Parkhead	Petershill	
1917–18	Vale of Clyde	Ashfield	Petershill
1918–19	**Rutherglen Glencairn**	Ashfield	
1919–20	Vale of Clyde	Petershill	Parkhead
1920–21	Ashfield	Benburb	Kirkintilloch Rob Roy
1921–22	Rutherglen Glencairn	Parkhead	
1922–23	Strathclyde	Shettleston	
1923–24	Shettleston	Rutherglen Glencairn	Parkhead
1924–25	St Roch's	Parkhead	St Anthony's
1925–26	St Roch's	Strathclyde	
1926–27	Shettleston	Strathclyde	Rutherglen Glencairn

== List of winners ==
Club	Winners	Runner-up	First win	Last win
Ashfield	6	2	1905–06	1920–21
Parkhead (Note: Includes one shared title, counted for both teams.)	4	3	1897–98	1916–17
Vale of Clyde	4	2	1899–1900	1919–20
Rutherglen Glencairn	4	2	1898–99	1921–22
Cambuslang Rangers	4	1	1910–11	1915–16
Maryhill	3	1	1900–01	1904–05
Strathclyde	2	7	1896–97	1922–23
Shettleston	2	1	1923–24	1926–27
St Roch's	2	0	1924–25	1925–26
Cambuslang Hibernian	1	2	1895–96	
Benburb	1	1	1913–14	
Petershill	0	4	–	
Glasgow Perthshire	0	2	–	
Clydebank Juniors	0	2	–	
Kirkintilloch Rob Roy	0	1	–	
