= Parkhead F.C. =

Former association football club in Glasgow City, Scotland

Coordinates: 55.84583°N 4.192851°W

Parkhead
- Full name: Parkhead Football Club
- Founded: 1880
- Dissolved: 1963
- Ground: The Sheddens; Helenslea Park, Glasgow; New Helenslea Park, Glasgow
- League: Glasgow Junior League 1895–1927; Scottish Intermediate League 1927–1931; Central Junior League 1931–1963
Home colours

Parkhead Football Club was a Scottish football club from the Parkhead district of Glasgow who played in Scottish Junior Football Association competitions from their formation in 1880 until going out of business in 1963. In the early years of the Scottish Junior Cup, Parkhead appeared in nine finals and won the cup five times. The club supplied eight players who went on to become full Scotland internationals later in their careers and Andy Auld who played five times for the US national team.

== History ==
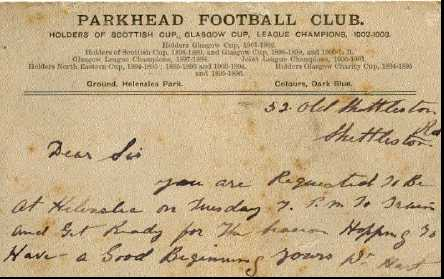
A ticket to the game in 1903

Across London Road from Westthorn Park there was a football ground with an ash pitch, earthen terracing, and a perimeter fence of black-painted corrugated iron. This was the home ground of Parkhead Juniors Football Club. Founded in 1880 it was the oldest team in the Scottish Junior League. They were one of the eight founder members in 1895 of the Glasgow Junior League, the strongest Junior league of the era.

They won the Scottish Junior Cup five times (1899, 1903, 1915, 1920 and 1924), and appeared as finalists in eight out of the 12 seasons from 1911. "If no single club could claim total dominance over the period (i.e. the first half of the 20th century) Parkhead at least merit an honourable mention with three league titles (one shared); four Glasgow Cups; two Junior cups and three other appearances in the final". On 10 April 1924, at the semi-final of the 1923–24 season they met neighbours Bridgeton Waverley at Celtic Park where they faced a crowd of 11,500, even though the SFA cup final was taking place at Hampden Park at the same time. Another strong Junior side, Strathclyde, were also based close by, but none of the three clubs survived into the late 20th century.

Parkhead was still playing in the 1950s, but became defunct in June 1963. In the later 1960s/early 1970s about a third of the ground at the Cuthelton Street/top-end-of Methven St junction was taken up by housing development, the rest of the ground down to London Road being turned into a landscaped area open to the public. The only buildings on the site in the 2010s are named after Helenslea: a nursery school and community centre.

== Colours ==
The club wore dark blue jerseys.

== Ground ==
Originally playing at The Sheddens on Old Shettleston Road, the club moved to Helenslea Park near current day Beattock/Sorby Streets in 1892 before development forced the club further out towards the Newbank/Lilybank area and into New Helenslea Park. The entrance was in Methven Street, but there were turnstiles on Cuthelton Street, just down a little from the "Wee Farm" shop (which was still extant in 2009) and across from Parkhead Fire Station (opened in December 1952).

== Scottish Junior Cup finals record ==
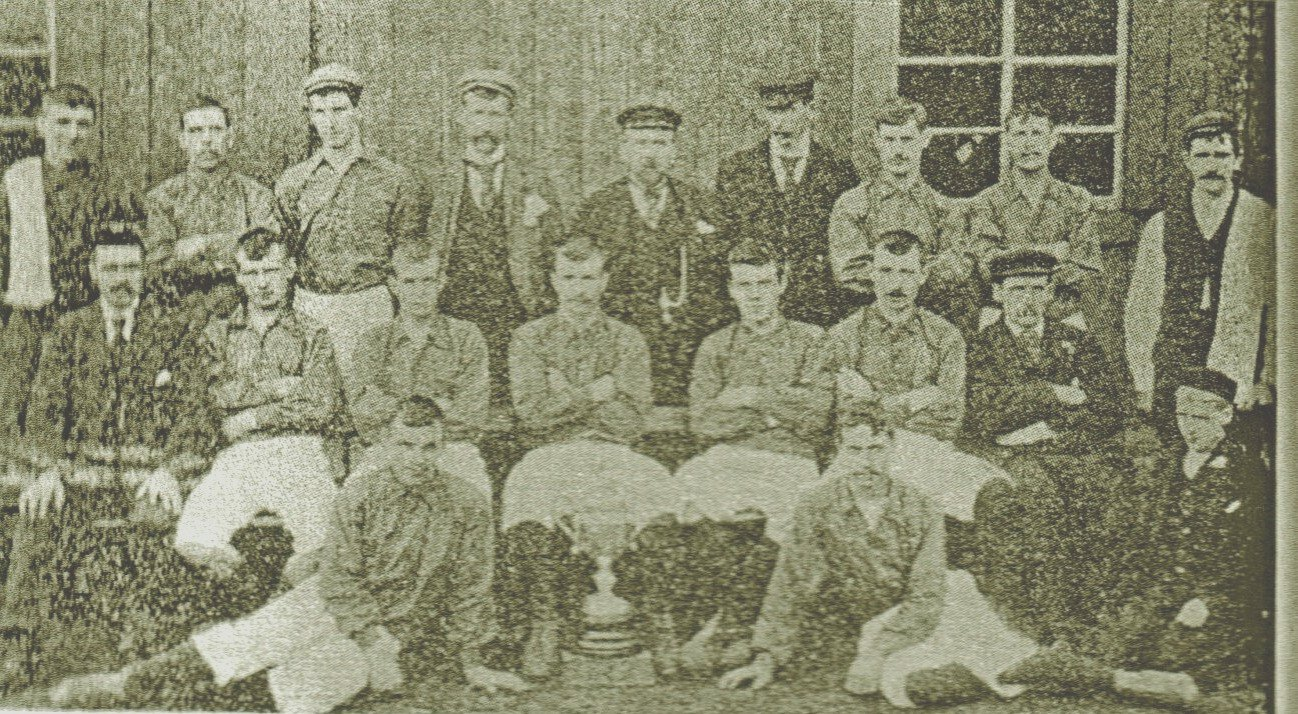
Parkhead Juniors, Scottish Junior Cup finalists 1896 - the trophy shown is believed to be the North Eastern Cup which they won in the same season.

Season	Opponent	Result
1895–96	Cambuslang Hibernian	1–2
1897–98	Dalziel Rovers	1–2
1898–99	Westmarch XI	4–1
1902–03	Larkhall Thistle	3–0
1903–04	Vale of Clyde	0–3
1914–15	Port Glasgow Athletic	2–0
1915–16	Petershill	0–2
1919–20	Cambuslang Rangers	2–0
1923–24	Baillieston	3–1 (after 1–1 draw)

== Honours ==
List of Parkhead honours;

- Scottish Junior Cup: 1898–99, 1902–03, 1914–15, 1919–20, 1923–24
- Glasgow Junior League: 1897–98, 1900–01, 1902–03, 1916–17
- West of Scotland Junior Cup: 1936–37
- Glasgow Junior Cup: 1898–99, 1900–01, 1901–02, 1902–03, 1915–16, 1924–25, 1950–51, 1955–56, 1956–57
- Glasgow Junior Consolation Cup: 1921–22
- North Eastern Junior Cup: 1903–04, 1912–13, 1916–17, 1924–25
- Glasgow Junior Charity Cup: 1911–12, 1912–13, 1951–52
- Glasgow Eastern Charity Cup: 1941–42, 1944–45, 1953–54, 1958–59
- Smyllum Charity Cup: 1921–22

== See also ==
Category:Parkhead F.C. players
