= Strathclyde F.C. =

Association football club in Glasgow City, Scotland

Coordinates: 55.846621°N 4.201832°W

Strathclyde
- Full name: Strathclyde Football Club
- Nickname(s): Strathies
- Founded: 1894
- Dissolved: 1965
- Ground: Springfield Park; Glasgow
- League: Glasgow Junior League; 1895–1927; Scottish Intermediate League; 1927–31; Central Junior League; 1931–65
Home colours

Strathclyde Football Club was a Scottish football club based in Glasgow, who played in Scottish Junior Football Association competitions from 1894 until they went out of business in 1965. They won the Scottish Junior Cup on three occasions.

== History ==
The club was formed in 1894 by followers of defunct Scottish Football League club Thistle, based in the Dalmarnock district of Glasgow. Thistle had spent their early years (up to 1892) playing at Beechwood Park located off Strathclyde Street, hence the name choice for the new team (the ground is not to be confused with the stadium of that name which was home to Leith Athletic F.C. in the same era).

Strathclyde won the Scottish Junior Cup for the first time in 1896–97 and went on to win twice more in 1906–07 and 1925–26. In the league, they were Glasgow Junior Football League winners in 1896–97 and 1922–23 (plus runners-up seven times), and runners-up in the Central Junior League in 1932–33 and 1939–40. They lost the lease on Springfield Park in 1965 and prepared to spend a year in exile at East Kilbride, but did not participate in the 1965–66 season, before going out of business in 1966 following a fire at the original ground with no new home forthcoming.

Springfield Park was later taken over by Celtic but never developed, and the site of the ground became part of the Athletes' Village for the 2014 Commonwealth Games.

== Colours ==
The club wore light blue jerseys.

== Ground ==
The club started out playing at Beechwood Park. In 1919, Strathclyde moved to New Springfield Park situated next to Belvidere Hospital towards Parkhead, becoming near-neighbours of Celtic as well as fellow strong Junior clubs Bridgeton Waverley and Parkhead F.C., neither of which survived into the late 20th century.

== Former players ==
Former players of the club include Archie Baird and Willie Waddell, who both went on to be capped at full international level for Scotland.

== Honours ==
- Scottish Junior Cup winners: 1896–97, 1906–07, 1925–26
- Glasgow Junior League winners: 1896–97, 1922–23
- Glasgow Junior League Cup winners: 1921–22, 1922–23
- West of Scotland Junior Cup winners: 1932–33
- Central League Cup winners: 1940–41

== Sources ==
- Scottish Football Historical Archive
