= Central Junior Football League =

Scottish football competition

The Central Junior Football League was a football league competition operated under the Scottish Junior Football Association between 1931 and 2002, with an expansion of its membership in 1968.

Covering the Greater Glasgow area and also including teams in Lanarkshire and Renfrewshire from the outset, the Central league was created following the Intermediate dispute raised in 1927 by many of the Junior teams in relation to compensation payments for their players moving to Scottish Football League clubs, which in that era was a very common route of progression into the top professional level (whereas towards the end of the 20th century the Senior clubs would typically develop young players within their own youth systems, with Junior squads usually consisting of players of various ages who had been deemed not quite good enough for the professional level, and moving up from Junior to Senior being more the exception than the norm as in the past). The dispute lasted four years, with none of the teams from the powerful Glasgow Junior Football League entering the Scottish Junior Cup and instead playing in separate competitions. In 1931 these teams returned to the SJFA and the Central league was created, although notes from its 1932 AGM stated that it was the 32nd such meeting, suggesting that internally it was considered a continuation of the pre-1927 GJL. The Scottish Intermediate Cup was retained but re-designated the West of Scotland Junior Cup which has survived to the present day.

The Central League continued to provide many finalists in the Scottish Junior Cup, although its membership was somewhat weakened in the 1960s when several teams who had been successful in the GJL era (primarily Parkhead, Strathclyde and Shawfield) folded, due in part to changes of the urban environment in which they had drawn their support, with traditional communities being rebuilt and many residents rehomed in new peripheral estates or new towns outside the city. Clydebank also left to become a senior club.

A reorganisation of the Junior level across Scotland in 1968 resulted in the Lanarkshire Junior Football League, which had existed since 1891 but had never been as successful as the Glasgow and Central leagues which instead drew the best Lanarkshire teams away into their setup, was fully integrated into the new Central 'region', one of six in the country. In that period, Cambuslang Rangers (coincidentally one of those members based in Lanarkshire but always affiliated with Glasgow leagues) were the strongest club, but their dominance faded after the mid-1970s.

From the 1968 merger until 1982, a three-division setup was in operation, organised on merit (i.e. a hierarchy with promotion and relegation between them, rather than three sections of equal prominence split geographically) but with an end-of-season playoff between the three divisional winners to determine the overall champion who claimed the Evening Times Trophy, resulting in six of those fourteen seasons being won by the 'B Division' winners, and one – 1979–80 – in which the 'C Division' winners, Blantyre Victoria, were declared champions, although the format of the Evening Times Trophy had been amended to the Cup Winners' Cup a year earlier. In the next two seasons, Pollok then Lesmahagow were both overall champions and Evening Times Trophy winners before the playoffs were discontinued and the 1982–83 'A Division' winners were automatically declared the champions. This system then remained in place until 2002, when the Central region (in which Pollok had become the dominant force) was merged with the Ayrshire Junior Football League that had become increasingly strong in the 1990s in terms of supplying Scottish Junior Cup finalists, to form the Scottish Junior Football Association, West Region, one of three large regions. At the end of the 2019–20 season – which was curtailed due to the coronavirus pandemic – all 63 West Region clubs left the SJFA setup to join a new West of Scotland Football League in the Senior pyramid, bringing 125 years of Junior league football in the region (including the intermediate years) to an end.

== Champions ==
=== 1931–1968 era ===
Key:

Club also won the Scottish Junior Cup (doubles in **bold**).
Club were also runners-up in the Scottish Junior Cup.

Season	Winner	Runner-up (Note: In some seasons, this was the losing finalist in a playoff between two section winners.)	Other member in Scottish Cup final
1931–32	Shawfield	Yoker Athletic	Glasgow Perthshire
1932–33	Petershill	Strathclyde	Yoker Athletic
1933–34	Rutherglen Glencairn	Yoker Athletic	Benburb
1934–35	Clydebank Juniors	Renfrew	Petershill
1935–36	Blantyre Victoria	Morton Juniors	Yoker Athletic
1936–37	**Arthurlie**	Shawfield	Kirkintilloch Rob Roy
1937–38	Morton Juniors	Cambuslang Rangers	Benburb
1938–39	Petershill	Cambuslang Rangers	Rutherglen Glencairn
1939–40	Petershill	Strathclyde	Maryhill
1940–41	Clydebank Juniors	Blantyre Victoria	Glasgow Perthshire
1941–42	**Clydebank Juniors**	Maryhill Harp	Vale of Clyde
1942–43	Rutherglen Glencairn	Benburb	Kirkintilloch Rob Roy
1943–44	St Roch's	Clydebank Juniors	Glasgow Perthshire
1944–45	Clydebank Juniors	Petershill	Cambuslang Rangers
1945–46	Arthurlie	Blantyre Celtic	
1946–47	Vale of Leven	Petershill	Shawfield
1947–48	Kilsyth Rangers	Pollok	
1948–49	Blantyre Celtic	Clydebank Juniors	Petershill
1949–50	Clydebank Juniors	Petershill	Blantyre Victoria
1950–51	Duntocher Hibernian	Benburb	Petershill
1951–52	Petershill	Bellshill Athletic	
1952–53	Ashfield	Clydebank Juniors	Vale of Leven
1953–54	Kilsyth Rangers	Benburb	
1954–55	Ashfield	Petershill	Kilsyth Rangers
1955–56	**Petershill**	Parkhead	
1956–57	Kilsyth Rangers	St Roch's	
1957–58	Duntocher Hibernian	Parkhead	
1958–59	Johnstone Burgh	Ashfield	Shettleston
1959–60	Baillieston Juniors	Shettleston	Greenock Juniors
1960–61	Greenock Juniors	Maryhill Harp	Cambuslang Rangers
1961–62	**Kirkintilloch Rob Roy**	Shettleston	Renfrew
1962–63	Kirkintilloch Rob Roy	Shettleston	
1963–64	Petershill	Kirkintilloch Rob Roy	Cambuslang Rangers
1964–65	Johnstone Burgh	Shettleston	Baillieston Juniors
1965–66	Greenock Juniors	Cambuslang Rangers	
1966–67	Rutherglen Glencairn	Cambuslang Rangers	Kilsyth Rangers
1967–68	**Johnstone Burgh**	Petershill	

=== 1968–2002 era ===
Key:

Club also won the Scottish Junior Cup (doubles in **bold**).
Club were also runners-up in the Scottish Junior Cup.

Season	Winner	Runner-up	Other member in Scottish Cup final
1968–69 (Note: Denotes overall champion (Evening Times Trophy winner) and losing finalist after playoffs involving A, B and C Division winners.)	Petershill (Note: Petershill were also A Division winners.)	Pollok (Note: Shotts Bon Accord were A Division runners-up.)	Cambuslang Rangers
1969–70	Vale of Leven (Note: Renfrew were A Division winners.)	Renfrew	Blantyre Victoria
1970–71	**Cambuslang Rangers** (Note: Cumbernauld United were A Division winners.)	Cumbernauld United (Note: Petershill were A Division runners-up.)	
1971–72	**Cambuslang Rangers** (Note: Cambuslang Rangers were also A Division winners.)	St Roch's (Note: Pollok were A Division runners-up.)	
1972–73	Cambuslang Rangers	St Roch's (Note: East Kilbride Thistle were A Division runners-up.)	
1973–74	**Cambuslang Rangers**	Maryhill	
1974–75	East Kilbride Thistle (Note: East Kilbride Thistle were also A Division winners.)	Larkhall Thistle (Note: Johnstone Burgh were A Division runners-up.)	Rutherglen Glencairn
1975–76	East Kilbride Thistle	Port Glasgow (Note: Shettleston were A Division runners-up.)	
1976–77	Glasgow Perthshire (Note: Shettleston were A Division winners.)	Shettleston (Note: Kirkintilloch Rob Roy were A Division runners-up.)	Kirkintilloch Rob Roy
1977–78	Cumbernauld United (Note: Lesmahagow were A Division winners.)	Lesmahagow	Stonehouse Violet
1978–79	Pollok (Note: Port Glasgow were A Division winners.)	Port Glasgow (Note: Renfrew were A Division runners-up.)	
1979–80	Blantyre Victoria (Note: East Kilbride Thistle were A Division winners.)	East Kilbride Thistle (Note: Glasgow Perthshire were A Division runners-up.)	Baillieston Juniors
1980–81	Pollok (Note: Pollok were also A Division winners.)	Blantyre Victoria	Arthurlie
1981–82	Lesmahagow	East Kilbride Thistle (Note: Larkhall Thistle were A Division runners-up.)	Blantyre Victoria
1982–83	Petershill	Baillieston Juniors	East Kilbride Thistle
1983–84	Petershill	Pollok	Baillieston Juniors
1984–85	**Pollok**	Yoker Athletic	Petershill
1985–86	Pollok	Kilsyth Rangers	
1986–87	Pollok	Baillieston Juniors	
1987–88	Arthurlie	Kilsyth Rangers	Petershill
1988–89	Arthurlie	Pollok	
1989–90	Petershill	Pollok	Lesmahagow
1990–91	Pollok	Arthurlie	
1991–92	Lesmahagow	Petershill	
1992–93	Petershill	Pollok	
1993–94	Arthurlie	Lesmahagow	
1994–95	Pollok	Arthurlie	
1995–96	Pollok	Petershill	
1996–97	Maryhill	Pollok	
1997–98	Shotts Bon Accord	Maryhill	Arthurlie
1998–99	Maryhill	Pollok	
1999–2000	Benburb	Pollok	Johnstone Burgh
2000–01	Arthurlie	Benburb	Renfrew
2001–02	Johnstone Burgh	Larkhall Thistle	

== List of winners ==
Club	1931–1968 era				1968–2002 era				Overall	
Club	Win	R-up	First win	Last win	Win	R-up	First win	Last win	Win	R-up
Petershill	6	5	1932–33	1963–64	5 (Note: Were 'Division A' winners on 1 additional occasion between 1969 and 1982, but did not win champions playoff final so instead recorded as runner-up.)	2 (Note: Were 'Division A' runners-up on 1 additional occasion between 1969 and 1982, but not involved in champions playoffs.)	1968–69	1992–93	11	7
Pollok	0	1	N/A		8	8	1978–79	1994–95	8	8
Arthurlie	2	0	1936–37	1945–46	4	2	1987–88	2000–01	6	2
Clydebank Juniors	5	3	1934–35	1949–50	0	0	N/A		5	3
Cambuslang Rangers	0	4	N/A		4	0	1970–71	1973–74	4	4
Johnstone Burgh	3	0	1958–59	1967–68	1	0	2001–02		4	0
Kilsyth Rangers	3	0	1947–48	1956–57	0	2	N/A		3	2
Rutherglen Glencairn	3	0	1933–34	1966–67	0	0	N/A		3	0
East Kilbride Thistle	0	0	N/A		2 (Note: Were 'Division A' winners on 2 additional occasions between 1969 and 1982, but did not win champions playoff final so instead recorded as runner-up.)	2 (Note: Were 'Division A' runners-up on 3 additional occasions between 1969 and 1982, but not involved in champions playoffs.)	1974–75	1975–76	2	2
Maryhill	0	0	N/A		2	2	1996–97	1998–99	2	2
Lesmahagow	0	0	N/A		2	2	1981–82	1991–92	2	2
Blantyre Victoria	1	1	1935–36		1	1	1979–80		2	2
Ashfield	2	1	1952–53	1954–55	0	0	N/A		2	1
Kirkintilloch Rob Roy	2	1	1961–62	1962–63	0	0 (Note: Were 'Division A' runners-up on 2 additional occasions between 1969 and 1982, but not involved in champions playoffs.)	N/A		2	1
Vale of Leven	1	0	1946–47		1	0	1969–70		2	0
Greenock Juniors	2	0	1960–61	1965–66	0	0	N/A		2	0
Duntocher Hibernian	2	0	1950–51	1957–58	0	0	N/A		2	0
Benburb	0	3	N/A		1	1	1999–2000		1	4
St Roch's	1	1	1943–44		0	2	N/A		1	3
Baillieston Juniors	1	0	1959–60		0	2	N/A		1	2
Cumbernauld United	0	0	N/A		1	1	1977–78		1	1
Blantyre Celtic	1	1	1948–49		0	0	N/A		1	1
Morton Juniors	1	1	1937–38		0	0	N/A		1	1
Shawfield	1	1	1931–32		0	0	N/A		1	1
Shotts Bon Accord	0	0	N/A		1	0	1997–98		1	0
Glasgow Perthshire	0	0	N/A		1	0	1976–77		1	0
Shettleston	0	4	N/A		0	1	N/A		0	5
Yoker Athletic	0	2	N/A		0	1	N/A		0	3
Renfrew	0	1	N/A		0	1	N/A		0	2
Larkhall Thistle	0	0	N/A		0	2	N/A		0	2
Port Glasgow	0	0	N/A		0	2	N/A		0	2
Strathclyde	0	2	N/A		0	0	N/A		0	2
Maryhill Harp	0	2	N/A		0	0	N/A		0	2
Bellshill Athletic	0	1	N/A		0	0	N/A		0	1
