= Ayrshire Junior Football League =

The Ayrshire Junior Football League, known as the Western Junior League from 1919 until 1968, was a football league competition operated in Ayrshire under the Scottish Junior Football Association which operated until a merger in 2002.

The league was formed in the aftermath of World War I, primarily from clubs in the territory which today is North Ayrshire that had participated in smaller leagues such as the Irvine & District competition. After only a few years of operation, the Western clubs became embroiled in the Intermediate dispute relating to compensation payments due to clubs joining Scottish Football League teams, and along with the larger and more powerful Glasgow Junior Football League, broke away from the SJFA and its flagship tournament, the Scottish Junior Cup in 1927 to form a rival Intermediate Association, although still playing in a separate division from the Glasgow clubs.

The dispute was resolved in 1931 and the Western League resumed alongside a new Central League for the Glasgow clubs, with the former Scottish Intermediate Cup which had been contested between them now named the West of Scotland Junior Cup as an additional trophy to the Scottish Cup, with clubs from the Lanarkshire Junior Football League also taking part. The membership was soon expanded in 1934 with a group of clubs from the mining villages of south-east Ayrshire whose local league, founded in 1920 had folded (clubs in the north had been reluctant to admit them previously due to travel difficulties involved, a factor which had also prevented local clubs joining other leagues such as the Scottish Junior Football League in the past).

In 1968 the Junior football system across Scotland was reorganised, with Lanarkshire's league merging with the Central setup. The league in Ayrshire remained largely unchanged as one of six across the country, although the name was changed from the Western League to the Ayrshire Regional League and the few clubs which had been playing in it which were not based in the region moved to the Central leagues. From 1946 to 1976 the league was divided into North and South sections with the winners in a playoff to decide the overall champion, and thereafter two merit divisions were formed with a dozen clubs in each and promotion/relegation between them. It was at this point that Auchinleck Talbot, Scottish Cup winners in the 1940s but never a consistent force and without a major trophy in several years, rose to dominate the Junior grade at both regional and national levels, which generally continued into the 21st century.

The divisional setup remained until 2002, when the largest clubs in Ayrshire and Central merged under a two-tier Super League within a new Scottish Junior Football Association, West Region to increase the number of lucrative matches to be played between them (the three regions in the east of the country did likewise). A lower division of the West Region was designated specifically for legacy Ayrshire clubs in parallel with two for Central clubs, until 2018 when it was decided to organise all divisions on a regional basis. Some local cups still retained the link to Ayrshire.

== Champions ==
=== 1919–1968 era ===
Key:

Club also won the Scottish Junior Cup (doubles in **bold**).
Club were also runners-up in the Scottish Junior Cup.

Season	Winner	Runner-up	Other member in Scottish Cup final
1919–20	Ardrossan Winton Rovers		
1920–21	Kilwinning Rangers		
1921–22	Irvine Meadow		Kilwinning Rangers
1922–23	Kilwinning Rangers		
1923–24	Saltcoats Victoria	Ardeer Thistle	
1924–25	Ardeer Thistle		
1925–26	**Saltcoats Victoria**		
1926–27	Saltcoats Victoria		
1927–28	Western Intermediate League		
1928–29	Western Intermediate League		
1929–30	Western Intermediate League		
1930–31	Western Intermediate League		
1931–32	Kilwinning Rangers	Irvine Meadow	
1932–33	Irvine Meadow		
1933–34	Ardrossan Winton Rovers	Kilwinning Rangers	
1934–35	Glenafton Athletic	Kilwinning Rangers	
1935–36	Cumnock Juniors	Irvine Victoria	
1936–37	Cumnock Juniors	Glenafton Athletic	
1937–38	Johnstone Athletic	Saltcoats Victoria	
1938–39	Saltcoats Victoria	Ardeer Recreation	
1939–40	Johnstone Athletic	Auchinleck Talbot	
1940–41	Ardeer Recreation		
1941–42	Ardeer Recreation		
1942–43	Ardeer Recreation	Hurlford United	
1943–44	Ardeer Recreation	Kilmarnock Juniors	
1944–45	Ardeer Recreation	Hurlford United	
1945–46	Saltcoats Victoria	Muirkirk	
1946–47	Neilston Juniors	Lugar Boswell Thistle	
1947–48	Kilbirnie Ladeside	Auchinleck Talbot	Irvine Meadow
1948–49	Irvine Meadow	Annbank United	Auchinleck Talbot
1949–50	Kilbirnie Ladeside	Annbank United	Cumnock Juniors
1950–51	Irvine Meadow	Craigmark Burntonians	
1951–52	**Kilbirnie Ladeside**	Cumnock Juniors	
1952–53	Cumnock Juniors	Kilbirnie Ladeside	Annbank United
1953–54	Lugar Boswell Thistle	Irvine Meadow	
1954–55	Irvine Meadow	Auchinleck Talbot	
1955–56	Lugar Boswell Thistle	Irvine Meadow	
1956–57	Irvine Meadow	Auchinleck Talbot	
1957–58	**Irvine Meadow**	Whitletts Victoria	
1958–59	Glenafton Athletic	Irvine Meadow	
1959–60	Ardeer Thistle	Darvel	
1960–61	Irvine Meadow	Glenafton Athletic	
1961–62	Glenafton Athletic	Irvine Meadow	
1962–63	Glenafton Athletic	Beith Juniors	Irvine Meadow
1963–64	Glenafton Athletic	Beith Juniors	
1964–65	Beith Juniors	Kello Rovers	
1965–66	Kilwinning Rangers	Glenafton Athletic	
1966–67	Darvel	Beith Juniors	
1967–68	Kilbirnie Ladeside	Craigmark Burntonians	

=== 1968–2002 era ===
Key:

Club also won the Scottish Junior Cup (doubles in **bold**).
Club were also runners-up in the Scottish Junior Cup.

Season	Winner	Runner-up	Other member in Scottish Cup final
1968–69	Beith Juniors	Kello Rovers	
1969–70	Irvine Meadow	Hurlford United	
1970–71	Irvine Meadow	Cumnock Juniors	
1971–72	Cumnock Juniors	Kilbirnie Ladeside	
1972–73	Hurlford United	Irvine Meadow	
1973–74	Cumnock Juniors	Irvine Victoria	
1974–75	Kello Rovers	Kilbirnie Ladeside	
1975–76	Kilbirnie Ladeside	Cumnock Juniors	
1976–77	**Kilbirnie Ladeside**	Cumnock Juniors	
1977–78	Auchinleck Talbot	Cumnock Juniors	
1978–79	Auchinleck Talbot	Beith Juniors	Cumnock Juniors
1979–80	Auchinleck Talbot	Craigmark Burntonians	
1980–81	Cumnock Juniors	Auchinleck Talbot	
1981–82	Cumnock Juniors	Auchinleck Talbot	
1982–83	Glenafton Athletic	Kello Rovers	
1983–84	Cumnock Juniors	Auchinleck Talbot	
1984–85	Cumnock Juniors	Annbank United	
1985–86	**Auchinleck Talbot**	Irvine Meadow	
1986–87	**Auchinleck Talbot**	Craigmark Burntonians	Kilbirnie Ladeside
1987–88	**Auchinleck Talbot**	Cumnock Juniors	
1988–89	Irvine Meadow	Auchinleck Talbot	Cumnock Juniors
1989–90	Auchinleck Talbot	Cumnock Juniors	
1990–91	**Auchinleck Talbot**	Kilbirnie Ladeside	
1991–92	**Auchinleck Talbot**	Kilwinning Rangers	Glenafton Athletic
1992–93	**Glenafton Athletic**	Irvine Meadow	
1993–94	Irvine Meadow	Auchinleck Talbot	Largs Thistle
1994–95	Auchinleck Talbot	Beith Juniors	
1995–96	Cumnock Juniors	Glenafton Athletic	
1996–97	Auchinleck Talbot	Glenafton Athletic	
1997–98	Cumnock Juniors	Auchinleck Talbot	
1998–99	**Kilwinning Rangers**	Auchinleck Talbot	
1999–2000	Kilwinning Rangers	Auchinleck Talbot	
2000–01	Auchinleck Talbot	Glenafton Athletic	
2001–02	Glenafton Athletic	Cumnock Juniors	Auchinleck Talbot

== List of winners ==
Club	1919–1968 era				1968–2002 era				Overall	
Club	Win	R-up (Note: Records from the 1919–1968 era are incomplete as per cited sources; not all runners-up are accounted for (missing South section finalist when winner was from North section).)	First win	Last win	Win	R-up	First win	Last win	Win	R-up
Auchinleck Talbot	0	4	N/A		12	8	1978–79	2000–01	12	12
Irvine Meadow	8 (Note: Also won the Western Intermediate League on 1 occasion.)	4 (Note: Also runners-up in the Western Intermediate League on 1 occasion.)	1921–22	1960–61	4	3	1969–70	1993–94	12	7
Cumnock Juniors	3	1	1935–36	1952–53	8	7	1971–72	1997–98	11	8
Glenafton Athletic	5	2	1934–35	1963–64	3	3	1982–83	2001–02	8	5
Kilbirnie Ladeside	4	1	1947–48	1967–68	2	3	1975–76	1976–77	6	4
Kilwinning Rangers	6 (Note: Also won the Western Intermediate League on 2 occasions.)	2	1920–21	1965–66	2	1	1998–99	1999–2000	8	3
Ardeer Recreation	6	0	1940–41	1959–60	0	0	N/A		6	0
Saltcoats Victoria	5	0	1923–24	1945–46	0	0	N/A		5	0
Beith Juniors	1	3	1964–65		1	2	1968–69		2	5
Ardrossan Winton Rovers	2	0	1919–20	1933–34	0	0	N/A		2	0
Lugar Boswell Thistle	2	0	1953–54	1955–56	0	0	N/A		2	0
Johnstone Athletic	2	0	1937–38	1939–40	0	0	N/A		2	0
Kello Rovers	0	0	N/A		1	2	1974–75		1	2
Hurlford United	0	0	N/A		1	1	1972–73		1	1
Neilston Juniors	1	0	1946–47		0	0	N/A		1	0
Darvel	1	0	1966–67		0	0	N/A		1	0
Ardeer Thistle	1	0	1924–25		0	0	N/A		1	0
Annbank United	0	1	N/A		0	1	N/A		0	2
Craigmark Burntonians	0	1	N/A		0	2	N/A		0	3
Whitletts Victoria	0	1	N/A		0	0	N/A		0	1
Irvine Victoria	0	0	N/A		0	1	N/A		0	1
