= Clydebank Juniors F.C. =

Scottish football club

Clydebank Juniors
- Full name: Clydebank Juniors Football Club
- Founded: 1899 (as Duntocher F.C.)
- Dissolved: 1964 (merged with East Stirlingshire F.C.)
- Ground: Kilbowie Park, Clydebank (1900–1939); New Kilbowie Park, Clydebank (1939–1964)

Clydebank Juniors F.C. was a Junior Football club based in the Scottish town of Clydebank. Formed in 1899 as Duntocher F.C., in the neighbouring village of Duntocher, they played their home games at Kilbowie Park in Clydebank.

In 1964 the club was merged with Falkirk-based club, East Stirlingshire F.C. After one year the merger was overturned and a new Clydebank football team formed.

== History ==
Clydebank Juniors were formed in the village of Duntocher in 1899, under the name of Duntocher F.C, as the result of a breakaway from another local junior club, Duntocher Hibernian. They changed their name to Clydebank Juniors in 1900 on moving to the town itself. They were based at the original Kilbowie Park prior to the construction of an upgraded ground (often called "New Kilbowie") in 1939. Between 1930 and 1950 Clydebank Juniors won a number of Junior Football prizes, including five Central League titles, one Intermediate League, two West Of Scotland Junior Cups and, most notably, the 1942 Scottish Junior Cup. The club's ground was rebuilt on the same site in 1939, and whilst retaining its original name was often referred to as "New Kilbowie".

=== Merger ===
In 1964 the Steedman brothers, Jack and Charlie, owners of East Stirlingshire F.C., controversially merged their club with Clydebank Juniors. The new club, whose name was usually abbreviated to E.S. Clydebank, inherited East Stirlingshire's place in Division Two, playing home matches at Kilbowie. After a year, a legal challenge by East Stirlingshire supporters led to them resuming their former identity back in Falkirk. E.S. Clydebank's single season is generally considered by historians and statisticians as a contiguous part of East Stirlingshire's record, as the merged club was never elected to the SFA or League in its own right.

==== Aftermath ====
The Steedmans elected to remain at Clydebank, establishing a new club at senior level, named Clydebank F.C.

== Honours ==
- Scottish Junior Cup:
  - Winners: 1941–42
- West of Scotland Cup: 1929–30, 1949–50
- Intermediate League: 1929–30
- Central League: 1934–35, 1940–41, 1941–42, 1944–45, 1949–50
- Glasgow Dryburgh Cup: 1929–30, 1932–33, 1934–35
- Pompey Cup: 1951–52, 1960–61
- Evening Times Trophy: 1934–35, 1940–41, 1941–42, 1944–45, 1949–50

== See also ==
- Category:Clydebank Juniors F.C. players
- History of football in Clydebank
