= 1919–20 in Scottish football =

Football in Scotland
- Season: 1919–20

1919–20 in Scottish football

Division One champions
- Rangers

Scottish Cup winners
- Kilmarnock

Junior Cup winners
- Parkhead

Scotland national team
- 1920 BHC

The 1919–20 season was the 47th season of competitive football in Scotland and the 30th season of the Scottish Football League. The number of teams in the Scottish League was increased from 18 to 22. Those clubs who were asked to retire for geographical reasons at the end of the 1916–17 season – Aberdeen, Dundee and Raith Rovers – returned, while Albion Rovers were elected.

== Scottish Football League ==
Pos	Team	Pld	W	D	L	GF	GA	GD	Pts
1	Rangers (C)	42	31	9	2	106	25	+81	71
2	Celtic	42	29	10	3	89	31	+58	68
3	Motherwell	42	23	11	8	74	53	+21	57
4	Dundee	42	22	6	14	79	65	+14	50
5	Clydebank	42	20	8	14	79	65	+14	48
6	Morton	42	16	13	13	71	48	+23	45
7	Airdrieonians	42	17	10	15	57	43	+14	44
8	Third Lanark	42	16	11	15	56	62	−6	43
9	Kilmarnock	42	20	3	19	59	73	−14	43
10	Ayr United	42	15	10	17	72	69	+3	40
11	Dumbarton	42	13	13	16	57	65	−8	39
12	St Mirren	42	15	8	19	63	81	−18	38
13	Partick Thistle	42	13	12	17	51	62	−11	38
14	Queen's Park	42	14	10	18	67	73	−6	38
15	Heart of Midlothian	42	14	9	19	57	72	−15	37
16	Clyde	42	14	9	19	64	71	−7	37
17	Aberdeen	42	11	13	18	46	64	−18	35
18	Hibernian	42	13	7	22	60	79	−19	33
19	Raith Rovers	42	11	10	21	61	83	−22	32
20	Falkirk	42	10	11	21	45	74	−29	31
21	Hamilton Academical	42	11	7	24	56	86	−30	29
22	Albion Rovers	42	10	8	24	43	77	−34	28

Source: "1919-1920 SFL - SPFL Archive". SPFL.
(C) Champions

Champions: Rangers

== Other honours ==
=== Cup honours ===
==== National ====
Competition	Winner	Score	Runner-up
Scottish Cup	Kilmarnock	3 – 2	Albion Rovers
Scottish Qualifying Cup	Bathgate	2 – 0	Cowdenbeath
Scottish Junior Cup	Parkhead	2 – 0	Cambuslang Rangers
Scottish Amateur Cup	Queen's Park Victoria XI (Note: The Victoria XI were the fourth XI of Queen's Park.)	3 – 1	Civil Service Strollers

==== County ====
Competition	Winner	Score	Runner-up
Aberdeenshire Cup	Aberdeen	2 – 1 (Note: Second replay needed.)	Buckie Thistle
Ayrshire Cup	Stevenston United	1 – 0	Galston
Dumbartonshire Cup	Clydebank		
East of Scotland Shield	Hearts	3 – 1 (Note: Replay needed.)	Hibernian
Fife Cup	Dunfermline Athletic	3 – 1	Cowdenbeath
Forfarshire Cup	Dundee Hibs	1 – 0	Dundee
Glasgow Cup	Celtic	1 – 0	Partick Thistle
Lanarkshire Cup	Hamilton	2 – 1	Albion Rovers
Linlithgowshire Cup	Bathgate		Armadale
North of Scotland Cup	Clachnacuddin	2 – 1	Caledonian
Perthshire Cup	Blairgowrie	3 – 2	Morrisonians
Renfrewshire Cup	Morton	2 – 0	St Mirren
Southern Counties Cup	Nithsdale Wanderers	2 – 0	St Cuthbert Wanderers
Stirlingshire Cup	Falkirk	3 – 1	East Stirling

=== Non-league honours ===
Highland League

Top Three
Pos	Team	Pld	W	D	L	GF	GA	GD	Pts
1	Buckie Thistle	18	14	3	1	52	22	+30	31
2	Clachnacuddin	18	14	1	3	59	25	+34	29
3	Inverness Caledonian	18	11	2	5	52	30	+22	24

Otger Senior Leagues

Division	Winner
Banffshire League	unfinished
Border Senior League	Coldstream
Central League	Bo'ness
Eastern League	Dundee Hibernian
Northern League	Montrose
Perthshire League	Blairgowrie Amateurs
Western League	Stevenston United

== Scotland national team ==
Date	Venue	Opponents	Score	Competition	Scotland scorer(s)
26 February 1920	Ninian Park, Cardiff (A)	Wales	1–1	BHC	Tommy Cairns
13 March 1920	Celtic Park, Glasgow (H)	Ireland	3–0	BHC	Andrew Wilson, Alan Morton, Andy Cunningham
10 April 1920	Hillsborough Stadium, Sheffield (A)	England	4–5	BHC	Tom Miller (2), Alex Donaldson, Andrew Wilson

Key:

- (H) = Home match
- (A) = Away match
- BHC = British Home Championship

== Other national teams ==
=== Scottish League XI ===
Date	Venue	Opponents	Score (Note: Scottish League XI's score is shown first.)	Scotland scorer(s)
5 November 1919	Windsor Park, Belfast (A)	(Northern Ireland) Irish League XI	2–0	
20 March 1920	Celtic Park, Glasgow (H)	(England) Football League XI	0–4	

== See also ==
- 1919–20 Aberdeen F.C. season
