= Intermediate dispute =

Dispute in Scottish football

The Intermediate dispute was a major split in Scottish football which lasted from 1925 to 1931 and concerned the compensation that Junior clubs received when one of their players moved to a Senior football league side. Although largely confined to the West of Scotland, the dispute involved many of the best Junior clubs in the country, setting them in direct conflict with both the Scottish Football Association (SFA) and their own organisation, the Scottish Junior Football Association (SJFA).

== History ==
The dispute was principally led by the Glasgow Junior Football League (GJL). The GJL was the strongest Junior league in Scotland, having provided fifteen of the twenty-six Scottish Junior Cup winners since the turn of the century. Its clubs were increasingly dissatisfied with the behaviour of Senior clubs, in both Scotland and England, who would often approach a player without first contacting the Junior club themselves, then offering little or no compensation for that player if signed. In 1925, the GJL introduced a new player registration form, known as the "White Form". This document gave clubs a two-year option on a players services, enabling greater compensation to be demanded and became the principle to unite the Intermediate movement.

In March 1927, sixty-two clubs met to form the Scottish Intermediate Junior Football Association and a split with the Scottish Junior Football Association became inevitable. The SJFA sympathised with the Intermediate cause but would not sanction a breakaway. The Intermediates for their part, felt that the SJFA had failed to negotiate powerfully enough on their behalf with the Scottish Football Association. The reaction of the SFA was simply to prohibit the signing of any registered Intermediate player. In practice however, once a transfer fee was agreed between Senior and Intermediate clubs, a player's registration was cancelled, evidence destroyed, and the player could sign as a free agent.

In June 1927, the powerful GJL dissolved itself at its AGM and its twenty member clubs were joined by a further twenty from other leagues to form the breakaway Scottish Intermediate Football League. Winners of this league lifted the Evening Times Trophy, previously awarded to the Glasgow Junior League champions. In Ayrshire, the Western Junior Football League reformed as the Western Intermediate Football League at the same time with sixteen out of the eighteen clubs supporting the dispute. Clubs in Fife also showed an interest however the prospect of increased travel meant their participation was not viable. From the beginning of season 1927–28, Intermediate clubs began to compete in separate competitions, including their own Scottish Intermediate Cup (i.e. they did not take part in the Scottish Junior Cup).

For the next four seasons, despite much negotiation, both sides in the dispute maintained their positions. Numbers in the Intermediate leagues however were beginning to dwindle. A combination of clubs folding and defections to Junior leagues meant that by 1931, only forty-two Intermediate sides remained. Some influential clubs, including Irvine Meadow, started to push for a resolution. A series of meetings in February 1931 led to one final meeting on 27 May 1931 when the Intermediate clubs and SFA agreed terms with only two clubs voting against. A standard transfer fee of £75 was introduced for a professional Junior player. Provisional transfer arrangements also made it easier for clubs to keep their players whilst still involved in major competitions. With this compromise reached, the Scottish Intermediate Association renamed itself the West of Scotland Junior FA. It was also decided not to reform the GJL but to keep the Scottish Intermediate League format as the Central Junior Football League. The Scottish Intermediate Cup was also renamed as the West of Scotland Junior Cup, and whilst it was initially only open to the 'breakaway' clubs it is now open to all junior clubs in the region.

== Winners of Intermediate competitions ==
Scottish Intermediate Cup

1927–28 Ashfield

1928–29 Ashfield

1929–30 Clydebank Juniors

1930–31 Yoker Athletic

Scottish Intermediate League

1927–28 Baillieston
Runners-up: Ashfield

1928–29 Ashfield
Runners-up: Baillieston

1929–30 Clydebank Juniors
Runners-up: Bridgeton Waverley

1930–31 Bridgeton Waverley
Runners-up: Yoker Athletic

Scottish Intermediate League Cup

1927–28 Kirkintilloch Rob Roy

1928–29 Ashfield

1929–30 Clydebank Juniors

1930–31 Pollok

Glasgow Intermediate Cup

1927–28 Kirkintilloch Rob Roy

1928–29 Ashfield

1929–30 Clydebank Juniors

1930–31 Pollok

Western Intermediate League

1927–28 Kilwinning Rangers
Runners-up: Kilwinning Eglinton

1928–29 Irvine Meadow XI
Runners-up: Ardeer Thistle

1929–30 Kilwinning Eglinton
Runners-up: Troon Athletic

1930–31 Kilwinning Rangers
Runners-up: Irvine Meadow XI

Western Intermediate League Cup

1927–28 Irvine Meadow XI

1928–29 Irvine Meadow XI

1929–30 Kilwinning Rangers

1930–31 Darvel
