= St Roch's F.C. =

Association football club in Scotland

St Roch's
- Full name: St Roch's Football Club
- Nickname: The Candy Rock
- Founded: 1920
- Ground: James McGrory Park, Glasgow
- Capacity: 4,220
- Coordinates: 55°52′37″N 4°12′11″W
- President: Richard Todd
- Manager: Iain Kennedy
- League: West of Scotland League Premier Division
- 2025–26: West of Scotland League First Division, 2nd of 16 (promoted)
- Website: https://www.monthecandy.com/
Home colours	Away colours

St Roch's Football Club is a Scottish football club, based in Royston Road, Germiston, Glasgow. Nicknamed "the Candy Rock", they were formed in 1920 and play at James McGrory Park. They currently compete in the West of Scotland League Premier Division. They wear green and white stripes.

St Roch's was the first club of Jimmy McGrory, the British record goalscorer with 550 goals. McGrory, who grew up in the Garngad area where the club originated, began playing for them aged just 11. After helping the club win the Scottish Junior Cup in 1922, scoring in the final, he joined Celtic the following season.

== Honours ==
- Scottish Junior Cup
  - Winners: 1921–22

=== Other honours ===
- Glasgow Junior League winners: 1924–25, 1925–26
- Central League champions: 1943–44
- Central League B Division winners: 1972–73
- Central League C Division winners: 1971–72
- Central Division One winners: 1983–84
- Central Division Two winners: 1994–95
- Glasgow Dryburgh Cup: 1924–25, 1936–37, 1943–44, 1959–60, 1961–62

== Stadium ==
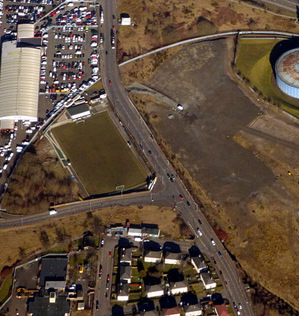
Aerial view of the ground

St Roch's play at James McGrory Park on Royston Road. Originally called Provanmill Park, the ground was renamed in honour of Jimmy McGrory in 2013.
