= Benburb F.C. =

Association football club in Glasgow City, Scotland

Benburb
- Full name: Benburb Football Club
- Nickname: The Bens
- Founded: 1885
- Ground: New Tinto Park, Glasgow
- Capacity: 1,000
- Coordinates: 55°51′8″N 4°19′36″W
- Manager: Ross Cusick
- League: West of Scotland League First Division
- 2025–26: West of Scotland League First Division, 10th of 16
- Website: benburbfootballclub.com
Home colours	Away colours

Benburb Football Club is a Scottish football club, based in Govan, Glasgow. Formed in 1885, the club is a member of the Scottish Junior Football Association and currently competes in the West of Scotland Football League. Benburb's colours are blue and white.

The team have been managed since February 2024 by Marty Campbell. Campbell took over from former Airdrie defender Paul Lovering (who had in turn succeeded his father Frank who had been in the job for the previous thirteen seasons.)

== History ==
The origins of the club name are not fully documented, although it has been suggested that the club's name indicates roots in what is now Northern Ireland, with a village of the same name being located there, and a significant battle taking place there during the 1640s. The suggestion is that the club was formed by Northern Irish immigrants to Glasgow, but this is not clear. It appears the first team known as Benburb was formed in the Govanhill area of Glasgow (then a separate burgh) in about 1885. After an aborted merger with a Gorbals team, Crown Athletic, in 1895, a reformed Benburb FC played in the nearby Oatlands neighbourhood until June 1898, when its ground, Braehead Park, was taken over by Glasgow Corporation to be incorporated into the new Richmond Park. That team disbanded, but a 'new' Benburb FC played during the new season later that year and there is thought to be a strong connection between the two clubs.

The new Benburb FC eventually found its home in the Govan area, some 5 kilometres (3.1 mi) miles to the north-west of Oatlands. Initially taking over Govandale Park (situated between the south bank of the River Clyde and Govan Old Parish Church) from the defunct Linthouse club in 1900, they moved south as the demands of industry for the land in central Govan increased, first in 1911 to a park on Broomloan Road owned by Govan Police Force, then in 1925 to an open plot at Craigton Park, Drumoyne, immediately north of the Inverclyde Line railway tracks. In spite of the upheaval, they remained members of the various Junior leagues covering the Glasgow area continuously since 1905.

From 1932 until 29 March 2014, Benburb was based at the purpose-built Tinto Park, which in its heyday could hold 10,000 spectators but latterly fell badly into disrepair. After the final match on that day – a 2–1 victory against Johnstone Burgh in a Central League Division 1 game – the land was prepared for housebuilding. The 2014–15 season was spent ground-sharing with Neilston Juniors while a new ground was built adjacent to the old one (on the same land which was previously Craigton Park). New Tinto Park, now just north of both the railway and the M8 motorway and fitted with 3G artificial turf, became the new home for the club in summer 2015 (although the facilities were not fully completed until a few months later).

New Tinto Park has also been used as the home ground for Rangers W.F.C. from 2015 to 2019, and for Rossvale (originally from Bishopbriggs) since 2019. Harmony Row Juniors now ground share at New Tinto Park

== Honours ==
Scottish Junior Cup

- Winners (2): 1933–34, 1935–36
- Runners-up (3): 1937–38, 1942–43, 1979–80

=== Other Honours ===
- Central League: 1999–00
- West of Scotland Cup: 1940–41, 1941–42, 1982–83, 2001–02
- Glasgow Junior League: 1913–14
