= Cambuslang Rangers F.C. =

Association football club in Scotland

Cambuslang Rangers
- Full name: Cambuslang Rangers Football Club
- Nicknames: The Lang, Camby, The Wee Gers
- Founded: 1899
- Ground: Somervell Park, Cambuslang
- Capacity: 3,000
- Coordinates: 55°49′17″N 4°10′33″W
- Manager: Paul McColl
- League: West of Scotland League First Division
- 2025–26: West of Scotland League Second Division, 9th of 16 (promoted)
- Website: https://www.cambuslangrangers.co.uk
Home colours	Away colours

Cambuslang Rangers Football Club are a Scottish football club based in Cambuslang, South Lanarkshire. Nicknamed The Lang, Camby or The Wee Gers, they were formed in 1899, and play at Somervell Park, in blue strips (uniforms).

They will play in the West of Scotland Football League Conference B from season 2021–22 after moving from the West Region of the Scottish Junior Football Association in 2020. They were awarded the title of 'Scottish Junior team of the 20th century' by the SJFA due to the honours they won in the 1970s.

== History ==
=== Formation and early years (1891–1933) ===
Originally named Leeside FC (founded in 1891) and joining the junior ranks in 1892. The club were later renamed, Clyde Rovers in 1896 before merging with Cambuslang Rovers and another Cambuslang based side, Halfway FC in 1899. In their first year The club shared grounds with the now defunct Cambuslang FC. Following Cambuslang FC's demise in 1897, Rovers took control of Bogshole Park, later to be renamed Mains Park which would be retained following the merger. Cambuslang Rangers FC would also play matches at Westburn Park where Cambuslang Hibernian were previously situated.

In 1904 Cambuslang Rangers moved to their new home ground, Somervell Park, which has remained their home since.

In the 1910–11 season, Cambuslang Rangers achieved their first successes by winning the Glasgow Junior League and Glasgow Junior Cup double. That would kick off the club's first spell of success as they went on to win the league in 1911–12, 1914–15 and 1915–16 before the Glasgow Junior League dissolved in 1927. The Lang would also win the Glasgow Junior Cup three more times (in 1920–21, 1926–27 and 1932–33 respectively) during this period.

=== First Scottish Junior Cup (1933–1959) ===
The club would win their first Scottish Junior Cup in the 1937–38 season. They had previously reached the final twice before, finishing runners up in 1919–20 and 1926–27. But this time though, it would be Cambuslang who would lift the trophy after two goals from Taylor and McGhie secured a 3–2 win over Benburb FC in front of a crowd of 28,000.

=== Dominance (1959–1974) ===
The 1959–60 season would set the foundations for a spell of dominance in the Junior game as Cambuslang Rangers beat Thorniewood United 2–0 to win the West Of Scotland Cup.

In the 1960–61 season, Cambuslang lost in the finals of five different competitions, including the West of Scotland Cup and the Scottish Junior Cup.

The club would again lift the Glasgow Junior Cup in 1963–64, doing the same again in two consecutive seasons between 1965 and 1967 before the club achieved four more Scottish Junior Cup triumphs in the space of just six years. The first of these ended a 31-year wait, having lost in three previous finals during that time (1944–45, 1960–61 and 1963–64). Cambuslang Rangers would face Kirkintilloch Rob Roy in the 1968–69 final, with a single goal from Keith Nelson being enough to give Cambuslang their second Scottish Junior Cup. This achievement proceeded two consecutive Central League Cups (in 1968–69 and 1969–70), four Central League titles in a row (1970 to 1974) and the Central Sectional League Cup in the 1970–71 season.

There was also three further Scottish Junior Cups won between 1970 and 1974 taking the club's tally to five. The club would beat Newtongrange Star 2–1 in 1971 before repeating the achievement, this time overcoming Bonnyrigg Rose 3–2 after goals from Cummings, McCallum and Brown. Cambuslang's string of trophies only split by a single defeat in the 1972–73 final second replay by the hands of Irvine Meadow, losing by 1–0 after the previous two matches were drawn 2–2 and 3–3. However, despite the setback Cambuslang Rangers completed the Junior Cup dominance in the following season, defeating Linlithgow Rose 3–1 with Cummings again getting on the scoresheet twice and Morrison also bagging a goal to complete The Lang's Scottish Junior Cup triumphs to date.

=== The dormant years (1975–1999) ===
Cambuslang struggled to replicate their achievements and it took over ten years for them to win another trophy. In 1986 the club won the Central District First Division title, and managed to repeat this in the 1989–90 and 1990–91 seasons – that 1990–91 side also won the Evening Times Cup Winners Cup making it a double for that season.

=== Millennial era (2000–2018) ===
Despite winning the Central Sectional League Cup again in the 2000–01 season Cambuslang Rangers again continued to struggle in terms of success during the 2000s.

As the 2010s began a spell of success seemed to be returning after the club's Central District Second Division league win in 2013 was later followed by a Glasgow Junior Cup in the 2015–16 campaign under the leadership of former player Paul McColl.

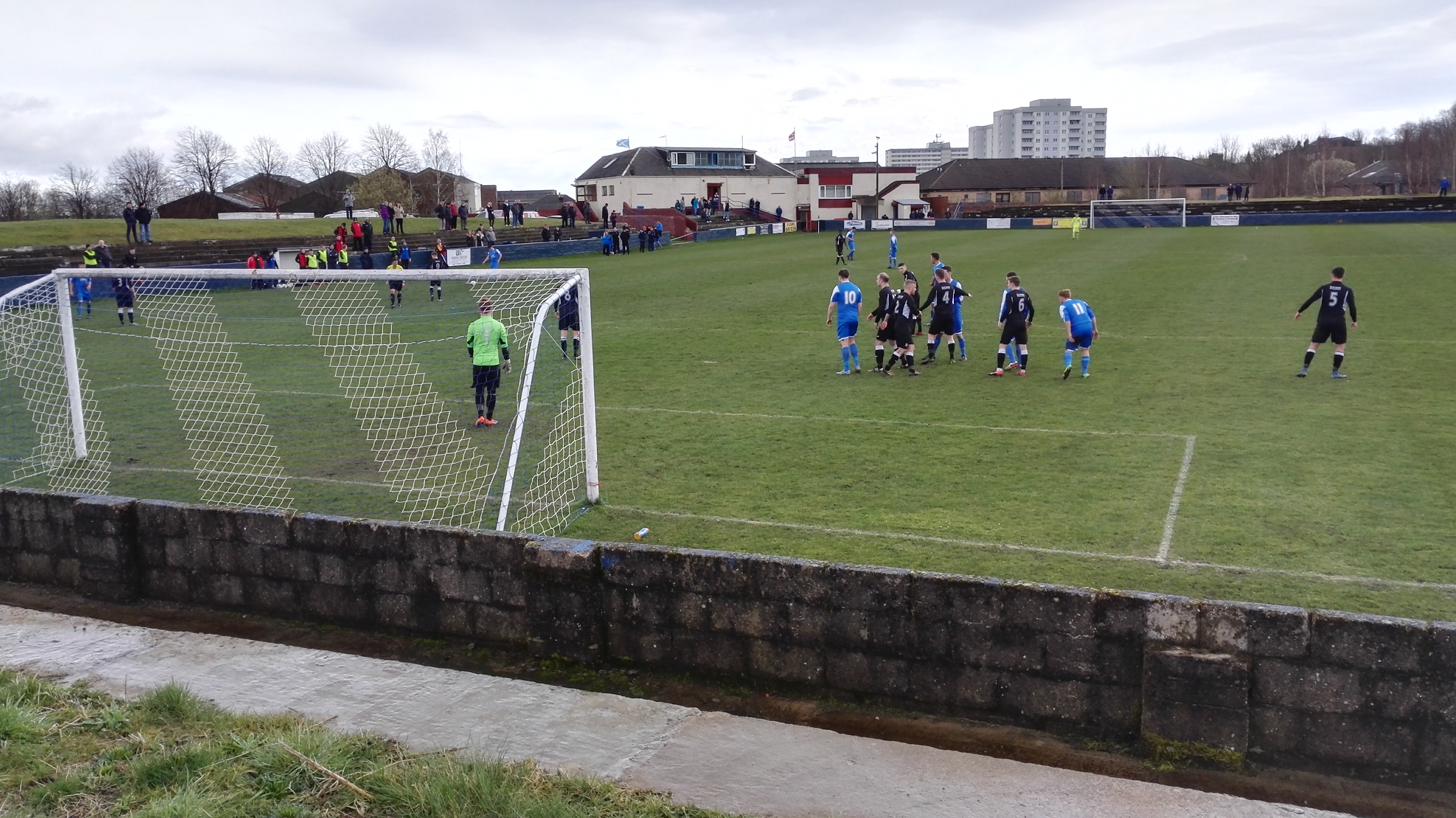
During a match against Wishaw, 2017

Under McColl's management, Cambuslang Rangers would continue to succeed on the park as they won back-to-back promotions in the 2016–17 and 2017–18 seasons before he left his position in January 2019.

=== Financial difficulties and re-emergence (since 2019) ===
Whilst all was seemingly going well on the park behind the scenes, Cambuslang Rangers had financial difficulties which culminated in the club being on the verge of extinction at the end of 2018. This led to the club having to let go of most of their players, with only two opting to stay, and committee members resigning from their positions.

In January 2019, local businessman David Kerr stepped up and took charge of the club. Following the departure of McColl, the club would have to appoint a new manager and draft in players to see out the 2018–19 season.

After successfully completing the season, the club introduced an academy set-up with the aim to develop local young players for the first team with age groups ranging from 'Camby Cubs' to U21s. In May 2020, the club announced that under-21 players Scott Williamson and Campbell Gray would be the first players in the club's history to graduate from the youth academy to the first team. The club also announced that Billy Campbell and Paul McColl would be co-managers for the 2020–21 campaign.

In August 2020 Chairman David Kerr stepped down from his post, leaving the club in a much healthier state than when he took over.

In October 2020 due to the COVID-19 pandemic the committee made the decision to pull the club from all league action.

== Academy ==
In November 2021, Cambuslang Rangers restructured their youth academy to establish a “professional youth football setup within the club”. The new academy was launched with the appointment of John Sneddon as Academy Director and Steven Owens as Academy Coaching Director. Sneddon stated that the academy would be an “excellent opportunity to put the academy front and centre and be the place to deliver the pathway to first team football.”

In March 2022, the Cambuslang Rangers Academy grabbed media attention, having progressed several youth players into the first team within a matter of months. The Daily Record stated the academy was “already proving a huge success” under Sneddon and Owens’ leadership.

Ahead of the 22/23 season, the academy launched their plan to create unity across the set-up. Each team wear the same royal blue strips across all year groups. The crest worn is identical as the first team, with “Cambuslang Rangers Football Academy” wrapped around a circular badge.

== Crest and colours ==
The Cambuslang Rangers club crest is an initialisation of the club's name with the letters C.R.F.C. interweaved inside the crest.

In the 1990s the club name and established year were added around the crest and have remained there to avoid confusion with the Rangers FC crest.

In November 2021, Cambuslang Rangers launched their new brand marks as well as a new club crest which sported a prominent circle shape to signify a unity between the club and community.

When all of the Cambuslang clubs merged the Cambuslang Rovers traditional blue shirts would be retained and Cambuslang Hibernian's blue shorts and socks would add to it with only the green shirt being dropped from the strip.

Today the club still play in an all royal blue strip although traditionally, throughout the 20th century they mainly wore royal blue shirts, white shorts and white socks. The club have also known to play in yellow or white shirts with blue shorts and socks during the late 1960s and early 1970s however these strips were mainly worn to avoid clashing with opposition colours. In recent times Cambuslang have been known to wear a change kit colour of red.

== Influential players ==
While most of the 1970s players are held in high regard such as Bobby Brown, Keith Nelson, John Cummings, Billy Patterson and more, supporters tend to consider Willie McCallum as the club's best-ever player. He was a mainstay and major asset to the club in the 1970s and was often asked for his autograph which is very rare for players at junior level.

== Current squad ==
As of 20 July 2021

Note: Flags indicate national team as defined under FIFA eligibility rules; some limited exceptions apply. Players may hold more than one non-FIFA nationality.

No.	Pos.	Nation	Player
1	GK	SCO	Mateusz Miller
3	DF	SCO	Callum McLean
5	DF	SCO	Ryan Frances
6	MF	SCO	Jay Nelson
7	MF	SCO	Gary Griffin
10	FW	SCO	John Patrick Queen
11	FW	SCO	Ben Richford
14	MF	SCO	Dean Farmer
15	MF	SCO	Jamie Prete
16	FW	SCO	Kiegan Parker
17	DF	SCO	Lee McLelland

No.	Pos.	Nation	Player
19	MF	SCO	Paul Gordon
21	MF	SCO	Kieran Christie
22	MF	SCO	Ryan Stewart
23	MF	SCO	Anthony Stevenson
--	DF	SCO	Lewis Slivinski
--	DF	SCO	Terry Hewitt
--	MF	SCO	David Templeton
--	MF	SCO	Lewis Whitelaw
--	FW	ALB	Armand Dollani
--	FW	ENG	Isaac Layne

== On loan ==
Note: Flags indicate national team as defined under FIFA eligibility rules; some limited exceptions apply. Players may hold more than one non-FIFA nationality.

No. / Pos. / Nation / Player; 24 / GK / ESP / Fermin Jiminez (on loan at Larkhall Thistle)	No. / Pos. / Nation / Player; -- / FW / SCO / Scott McKean (on loan at Larkhall Thistle)

== Coaching staff ==
Position	Name
Manager	Paul McColl
First Team Coach	David Smith
Academy Director	John Sneddon
Academy Coaching Director	Steven Owens

== Supporters ==
Cambuslang Rangers attracted big crowds through most of the 20th century with as many as tens of thousands attending each week to see the club compete. These supporters were mainly local employees at the neighbouring local business, Hoover. However, since Hoover's liquidation the crowds have been impacted at Somervell Park.

In more recent times the club typically have attendances of around 200 per home game.

In October 2019 the club set up a singing section known as the Somervell Boys which contains mainly local youths who bring noise to matches and was described by the club as a group which "generate a positive and colourful atmosphere" for the club.

Cambuslang Rangers have been playing matches at their home ground of Somervell Park since 1904 and have a record attendance of 13,500.

== Club anthem ==
Since 2019 the club have adopted the Bay City Rollers classic "Shang-A-Lang" as their club anthem due to the title reflecting their nickname 'The Lang'.

== Rivalries ==
Cambuslang Rangers main rivalry is with their geographic neighbours, Rutherglen Glencairn which has existed since the early days of Cambuslang Rangers merging and has continued to this day as the club's main local rivals.

== Notable former players ==
- Brian Ahern
- Crawford Baptie
- Hugh Burns
- Kenny Campbell
- Peter Coleman
- Billy Collings
- John Cummings
- John Gemmell
- Mark Gilhaney
- Arthur Graham
- Kyle Hutton
- Niall Hopper
- Jimmy Jackson
- Willie Logie
- Brian Martin
- Charlie McCully
- Bobby Murdoch
- Keith Nelson
- Benny Rooney
- Tommy Tait
- Matt Tees
- Andy Wilson

== Honours ==
=== Cups ===
- Scottish Junior Cup: Winners 1937–38, 1968–69, 1970–71, 1971–72, 1973–74
  - Runners-up 1919–20, 1926–27, 1944–45, 1960–61, 1963–64, 1972–73
- West of Scotland Cup: 1959–60, 1971–72, 1972–73
- Glasgow Junior Cup: 1911–12, 1920–21, 1926–27, 1932–33, 1946–47, 1963–64, 1965–66, 1966–67
- Central League Cup: 1968–69, 1969–70
- Central (Beatons Coaches) Sectional League Cup: 1970–71, 2000–01
- Evening Times Cup Winners Cup: 1990–91

=== Leagues ===
- Central League: 1970–71, 1971–72, 1972–73, 1973–74
- Central League A Division: 1971–72, 1972–73, 1973–74
- Glasgow Junior League: 1910–11, 1911–12, 1914–15, 1915–16
- Central League B Division: 1970–71
- Central League First Division: 1985–86, 1989–90, 1990–91
- West Region Central First Division: 2016–17
- West Region Central Second Division: 2012–13
- West of Scotland Football League Conference B: 2021–22
