= Maryhill F.C. =

Association football club in Glasgow, Scotland

Maryhill
- Full name: The Maryhill Football Club
- Nickname: The Hill
- Founded: 1884
- Ground: Lochburn Park, Glasgow
- Capacity: 1,800 (205 seated)
- Coordinates: 55°53′28″N 4°17′16″W
- Manager: Ross Wilson
- League: West of Scotland League First Division
- 2025–26: West of Scotland League Second Division, 7th of 16 (promoted)
- Website: https://maryhillfc.com
Home colours	Away colours

Maryhill Football Club are an association football team based in the Maryhill area of Glasgow, Scotland. The team is a member of the Scottish Junior Football Association, now playing in the West of Scotland Football League First Division in the 2026–27 season.

== History ==
Formed in 1884 as a Junior club, Maryhill were beaten finalists in the second-ever Scottish Junior Cup in 1887–88 and turned senior the following season. The club entered the Scottish Cup three years running from 1888 but never got further than the second round, suffering 9–3 and 7–2 defeats to Third Lanark and Linthouse respectively in 1889 and 1890. Maryhill eventually returned to the Junior ranks in 1894 with some success, reaching four national cup finals in eight years. The Hill also won a wartime final in 1940.

Post-war they were not one of the bigger Junior clubs, but investment from a wealthy backer, Ronnie MacDonald, in the 1990s brought a period of success. The team plays at Lochburn Park, and has done since 1897. Club colours are red and black.

The club received national news attention in April 2017 when Gavin Stokes scored the fastest goal on record in world football history in a home game against Clydebank, with his advance to the top corner from the midline timed at 2.1 seconds

In June 2019 it was announced that ICW (Insane Championship Wrestling) was to sponsor the club.

Ross Wilson is the club's manager having been appointed in June 2026, following the departure of Mark Young.

== Current squad ==
Note: Flags indicate national team as defined under FIFA eligibility rules; some limited exceptions apply. Players may hold more than one non-FIFA nationality.

No.	Pos.	Nation	Player
—	GK	SCO	Jamie Wright
—	GK	SCO	Lee Nelson
—	DF	SCO	Nathan Carmichael
—	DF	SCO	Adam Kirk
—	DF	SCO	Jethy Kinavuidi
—	DF	SCO	Fraser MacDuff
—	DF	SCO	Callum Drummond
—	DF	SCO	Angus MacLean
—	DF	SCO	Nazar Volshyn
—	DF	SCO	Wade Wyngard
—	MF	SCO	Liam Reid
—	MF	SCO	Coby O'Brien

No.	Pos.	Nation	Player
—	MF	SCO	Jamie Hogg
—	MF	SCO	Ross Daly
—	MF	SCO	Ciaran Shaw
—	FW	SCO	Ben Murphy
—	FW	SCO	Roan Mina
—	FW	SCO	Israel Onwubiko
—	FW	SCO	Euan McLuckie
—	FW	SCO	Taylor Fadian

== Coaching staff ==
Role	Name
Manager	(Scotland) Ross Wilson
Assistant Manager	(Scotland) Paul McKay
Goalkeeping Coach	(Scotland) Marc Gallagher

== League History (2011-Present) ==
Year	Division	Tier	Position	P	W	D	L	F	A	GD	Pts
2011/12	Central District Div 2	4	5	20	11	1	8	44	34	10	34
2012/13	Central District Div 2	4	2	20	14	2	4	52	32	20	44
2013/14	Central District Div 1	3	9	24	9	4	11	40	44	-4	31
2014/15	Central District Div 1	3	3	26	15	5	6	65	42	23	50
2015/16	Central District Div 1	3	2	26	17	2	7	54	34	20	53
2016/17	Superleague Div 1	2	10	26	9	4	13	35	60	-25	31
2017/18	Superleague Div 1	2	13	26	2	6	18	24	62	-38	12
2018/19	League One	3	12	30	12	0	18	46	82	-36	36
2019/20	League One	3	12	21	7	2	12	41	70	-29	23
2020/21	Conference A	N/A	9	6	2	1	3	6	9	-3	7
2021/22	Conference A	N/A	8	30	15	4	11	62	61	1	49
2022/23	WoSFL Div 2	3	12	30	11	3	16	53	57	-4	36
2023/24	WoSFL Div 2	3	7	30	12	8	10	58	54	4	44
2024/25	WoSFL Div 2	3	8	30	11	8	11	65	57	8	41
2025/26	WoSFL Div 2	3	5	30	15	6	9	77	54	23	51

== Famous players ==
- Jimmy Speirs, played one season at Maryhill, before joining Rangers and representing Scotland.
- Tommy Burns, former Celtic and Scotland player began his playing career at Maryhill.
- Jim Casey, former Celtic player and Scotland under-21 international.
- (Scotland) Jim Duffy, former player for, and later manager of, Morton and also manager of Dundee, among others. 1984–85 Scottish PFA Players' Player of the Year.
- (Scotland) Alex Harley, Scottish Football League top scorer in 1960–61 with 42 goals for Third Lanark.
- (Scotland) Pat McCluskey, former Celtic player with six Scottish under-23 caps.
- Danny McGrain, won 62 caps for Scotland and made 439 league appearances for Celtic between 1970 and 1987.
- Davie Meiklejohn, former Rangers captain and Scotland international.
- Paul Wilson, former Celtic and Scotland player.

== Honours ==
Scottish Junior Cup

- Winners: 1899–1900, 1939–40
- Runners-up: 1887–88, 1900–01, 1901–02, 1906–07

=== Other Honours ===
- West of Scotland Cup winners: 2000–01, 2003–04
- Central League Premier Division champions: 1996–97, 1997–98
- Glasgow Junior League champions: 1900–01, 1903–04, 1904–05
- West Central Division Two champions: 2012–13
