= Ashfield F.C. =

Association football club in Scotland

Ashfield
- Full name: Ashfield Football and Athletic Club
- Nickname: The Field
- Founded: 1886
- Ground: Stepford Football Centre, Glasgow
- Capacity: 500
- Coordinates: 55°51′31″N 4°7′33″W
- Chairman: Paul Maxwell
- Manager: Peter Hill
- League: West of Scotland League Second Division
- 2025–26: West of Scotland League Second Division, 13th of 16
- Website: https://www.ashfieldfootballclub.com/
Home colours

Ashfield Football Club are a Scottish football club originally based in the Possilpark area of north Glasgow. The club compete in the West of Scotland League Second Division and wear black and white hooped strips.

Formed in 1886, they were based at Saracen Park, which they shared latterly with the Glasgow Tigers speedway team; Ashfield moved in December 2022 to the Stepford Football Centre in Swinton and were promoted at the end of the season to the West of Scotland League First Division. They will continue to play at Stepford until a new ground is located/built.

In July 2018, former Ashfield player Paul Maxwell took over as manager; with former player Ryan Cairley taking over as assistant, and after four successful years moved to take up role of managing director. Michael Oliver took over the reins in June 2022; supported by assistant manager Jamie Broadfoot.

== Honours ==
- Scottish Junior Cup
  - Winners: 1893–94, 1894–95, 1904–05, 1909–10
  - Runners-up: 1913–14, 1920–21
- Central Junior Football League
  - Winners: 1952–53, 1954–55
- Glasgow Junior Football League
  - Winners: 1905–06, 1906–07, 1907–08, 1908–09, 1909–10, 1920–21
- Scottish Intermediate Football League
  - Winners: 1928–29
- West Super League First Division
  - Winners: 2010–11
- Central League C Division
  - Winners: 1968–69
- West Region Central Second Division
  - Winners: 2006–07

Promotion from the WoS PDM Buildbase Second Division 2022/2023

- Central Region Division Two
  - Winners: 1990–91

=== Other Honours ===
- Evening Times Cup winners 2011–12
- West of Scotland Junior Cup winners: 1927–28, 1928–29
- Glasgow Junior Cup winners: 1893–94, 1905–06, 1906–07, 1907–08, 1908–09, 1909–10, 1914–15, 1925–26, 1951–52, 1952–53, 1962–63
- Glasgow Dryburgh Cup: 1926–27, 1928–29, 1946–47, 1952–53, 1962–63
- Maryhill Charity Cup: 1898, 1918

== Former players ==
1. Players that have played/managed in the Football League or any foreign equivalent to this level (i.e. fully professional league).

- Johnny Quigley - Nottingham Forest, Huddersfield Town, Bristol City, Mansfield Town
- Walter Smith - Dundee Utd, Glasgow Rangers, Everton, Scotland
- Bobby Parker
- Bill Finlayson
- Blair Lochhead

2. Players with full international caps.

- Archie Gray
- Tommy Ring
- Alex Massie
- Alex James
- Bobby Neill
- Jimmy Gibson
- Johnny Crum
- Jimmy Blair
- Stevie Chalmers

3. Players that hold a club record or have captained the club.
