= Kirkintilloch Rob Roy F.C. =

Association football club in Scotland

Kirkintilloch Rob Roy
- Full name: Kirkintilloch Rob Roy Football Club
- Nicknames: The Rabs, The Roy
- Founded: 1878
- Ground: Kirkintilloch Community Sports Complex, Kirkintilloch
- Coordinates: 55°55′59″N 4°9′50″W
- President: Neil Anderson
- Manager: John Gibson
- League: West of Scotland League Premier Division
- 2025–26: West of Scotland League First Division, 6th of 16 (promoted)
- Website: https://www.robroy.org.uk/
Home colours	Away colours

Kirkintilloch Rob Roy Football Club are a Scottish football club based in the town of Kirkintilloch, East Dunbartonshire. Nicknamed The Rabs or The Roy, they were formed in 1878. They wear red and black hoops and currently compete in the West of Scotland League Premier Division.

== History ==
They are named after a defunct curling club which bore the same name, formed in 1855.

The well-known footballer Chic Charnley had a spell playing for The Rabs as did ex-Rangers defender Marvin Andrews. The Rabs have had many famous names playing for them – Joe McBride, Stevie Chalmers, George Young, Andy Lynch and Andy Ritchie.

The Rabs also featured in the very first televised Scottish Junior Cup Final on STV when they played Kilbirnie Ladeside in the 1977 final at Hampden Park, Glasgow, in front of a crowd of 11,476.

On 15 May 1963, Chelsea (who had just gained promotion to the top tier of the Football League) came to Adamslie Park to play Rob Roy in what was billed as a "Freedom from Hunger" charity match. Chelsea won 3–2 with their goals coming from Jimmy Mulholland (two goals) and Peter Houseman. Cooper and Reid (penalty) had pulled Rob Roy back to 2–2 before Houseman's winner.

After season 2007–08, Rob Roy were promoted to the Super Premier Division of the West Region. In season 2008–09 they finished a respectable sixth in the top division and also reached, for the first time in nearly 30 years, the semi-finals of the Scottish Junior Cup; they narrowly lost 1–0 on aggregate to the subsequent winners, Auchinleck Talbot. Season 2016–17 was Rob Roy's eighth season in the Super Premier Division of the West Region, a season where the club achieved a record high finish of 2nd and a record high points total of 43 as well as adding the Central League Cup to the trophy cabinet.

== Stadium ==
From 2014–15 to 2023–24, the team played their home games at Guy's Meadow, home of Cumbernauld United, whilst they waited for a new home ground to be built in Kirkintilloch. They previously played at Adamslie Park from 1926 until 2014. The opening game was against Petershill in which saw Petershill win the first match at Adamslie Park. Previously they had played at Smillies Pond (Coxdale Park) in the 1878/79 season, followed by a spell at a ground in the Broadcroft area of the town (where the Lion Foundry would be built) until 1889. The club then moved to Kelvindale Park, situated beside the River Kelvin which would remain their home until 1926. The decision to move once again from Kelvindale Park was due to the ground being no longer viable for the clubs needs.

After several years of unsuccessful attempts to sell the ground to keep Kirkintilloch Rob Roy financially viable (the club's social club having closed with debts of around £30,000), it was announced in April 2014 that the last match to be played at Adamslie Park would be a friendly against Rangers on Sunday 18 May, the ground having been sold to the housing developer Regency Homes for £3 million. The last competitive match to be played at Adamslie Park was a league relegation playoff match on Tuesday 3 June 2014 against Shotts. The match ended in a 1–1 draw, with the Rabs eventually being relegated.

The club also announced that, during the 2014–15 season, they would groundshare with Cumbernauld United at Guy's Meadow before moving to a new stadium in the Southbank area of Kirkintilloch. Aspirations for the new stadium were that it would have a modern stand with a capacity for 500 spectators as well as other modern facilities including FIFA's approved 4G pitch. However it was another 10 years before they returned to Kirkintilloch.

In May 2024, it was announced that Kirkintilloch Community Sports Club (the charitable wing of the football club set up in 2013) had successfully leased Kirkintilloch Community Sports Complex in the Southbank area of the town for 25 years, and the club has played at this ground since the 2024–25 season. The Stadium includes a full-size, artificial 3G sports pitch with floodlighting, which can divide into three seven-a-side pitches; a covered Main Stand and VIP Stand spectator seating for 302; standing areas for spectating and wheelchair friendly viewing areas; a pavilion building including changing facilities (4 changing rooms); reception area, café snack space, and toilets; and car/bus parking including electric car charging points and bike stands.

On Saturday 28 July 2024, Rob Roy played their first home game in Kirkintilloch in over ten years at the KCSC. Kyle Macdonald scored in the 7th minute to secure a 1-0 victory over Renfrew FC in the Rabs’ homecoming.

== Current squad ==
As of 30 September 2026

Note: Flags indicate national team as defined under FIFA eligibility rules; some limited exceptions apply. Players may hold more than one non-FIFA nationality.

No.	Pos.	Nation	Player
—	GK	SCO	Kyle Aitken
—	GK	SCO	Grant Lockhart
—	DF	SCO	Sam Archibald
—	DF	SCO	Luke Doran
—	DF	SCO	Scott Gibson
—	DF	SCO	Scott Granger
—	DF	SCO	Marcus Lavery
—	DF	SCO	Michael McGarahan
—	DF	SCO	Stephen White
—	MF	SCO	Aiden Allan
—	MF	SCO	Michael Baber
—	MF	SCO	Josh Bolan

No.	Pos.	Nation	Player
—	MF	SCO	Greg Burns
—	MF	SCO	Ross Caldwell
—	MF	USA	Ryan Kane
—	MF	POL	Kamil Król
—	MF	SCO	Cole McIntyre
—	FW	SCO	Kieran Breslin (on loan from Stirling Albion)
—	FW	SCO	Andy Gallacher
—	FW	SCO	Scott Jarvie
—	FW	SCO	Jamie McLean
—	FW	SCO	Billy Mortimer
—	FW	SCO	Callum Shearer (on loan from Dunfermline Athletic)

== Management team ==
Position	Name
Head of Football Operations	Kevin McGoldrick
Manager	John Gibson
Assistant	John Bell
First Team Coach	Franny Thacker
Goalkeeper Coach	Jack Steel

== Honours ==
Scottish Junior Cup

- Winners: 1920–21, 1942–43, 1961–62
- Runners-up: 1905–06, 1931–32, 1936–37, 1968–69, 1976–77
- Semi Finalists on 11 Occasions

South Region Challenge Cup

- Runners-up: 2023–24

West Of Scotland Cup

- Winners: 1960–61, 1962–63

Central League Champions

- Winners:1961–62, 1962–63

SJFA West Super League First Division

- Winners: 2007–08

SJFA West Central Division One

- Winners: 2006–07

Central Sectional League Cup

- Winners : 1971–72, 1973–74, 2016–17

Central Cup

- Winners : 1923–24, 1927–28, 1931–32

=== Other Trophies ===
- Glasgow Dryburgh Cup: 1923–24, 1927–28, 1931–32
- Jubilee Cup Winners 1977
- Coronation Cup Winners 1954–55, 1957–58, 1960–61
- Evening Times Trophy 1961–62, 1962–63, 1963–64

== Former players ==
1. Players that have played/managed in the Scottish Football League or any foreign equivalent to this level (i.e. fully professional league).
2. Players with full international caps.
3. Players that hold a club record.

- (Trinidad and Tobago) Marvin Andrews
- (Scotland) Phil Cannie
- (Scotland) Stevie Chalmers
- (Scotland) Chic Charnley
- (Scotland) Adam Coakley
- (Scotland) Joe Fascione
- (Scotland) Kevin Finlayson
- (Scotland) Dean Keenan
- (Scotland) Andy Lynch
- (Scotland) Joe McBride
- (Scotland) Danny O'Donnell
- (Scotland) Andy Ritchie
- (Scotland) George Young
- (Scotland) Sammy Black
