= Scottish Junior Football Association =

Scottish sporting body, founded 1886

- Founded: 1886 (140 years ago)
- Headquarters: Hampden Park, Glasgow
- Chief Operating Officer: Alex McDowall
- Website: http://www.scottishjuniorfa.com/

The Scottish Junior Football Association (SJFA) is an affiliated national association of the Scottish Football Association and is the governing body for the junior grade of football in Scotland. The term "junior" refers to the level of football played, not the age of the players. The closest equivalent terminology would be non-League football in England, the difference being that junior football in Scotland was not similarly integrated into its football league system until 2021.

Founded in 1886, the SJFA is responsible for disciplinary matters within the grade, certain player registration procedures and organising the annual Scottish Junior Cup. Other league and cup competitions are organised by regional committees. The association headquarters are at Hampden Park, Glasgow, which is Scotland's national football stadium. There was an earlier Scottish Junior FA, which was founded in Glasgow in October 1880. This body also ran a Scottish Junior Cup competition during 1880–81 season but appears to have disbanded at the end of that season.

== History ==
The first incarnation of the SJFA logo

The second incarnation of the SJFA logo

The SJFA was formed in Glasgow on 2 October 1886 and the first season's Junior Cup saw 39 clubs take part. Junior football had existed since the early 1880s, initially as separate local associations across Scotland for clubs not in membership of the SFA. This new national association acted as an umbrella for these local junior associations, as well as establishing the Scottish Junior Cup, a national cup competition. The first three winners of the Scottish Junior Cup all joined the SFA and stepped up to senior level. Gradually, a number of junior leagues grew in strength — particularly in Glasgow, where leading clubs drew large crowds. The Glasgow Junior FA, having seen a number of its proposals rejected at SJFA meetings, seceded from the SJFA in 1907 but returned a year later. Further disputes occurred in 1922 over "poaching" clubs and, in 1927, the GJFA was instrumental in the Intermediate dispute which split the SJFA for four seasons. The record number of clubs to enter the Junior Cup was 412 in 1922–23.

The local associations continued to run their leagues until 1968, when the SJFA instituted major reforms. This first phase of regionalisation removed the need for the many local associations, replacing them instead with six regional committees. These six regions — Ayrshire, Central, East, Fife, Tayside and North — still exist, to a certain extent, as divisions in the national league structure and as operators of certain cup competitions.

The last major league reform took place in 2002, with the six regions "merging" to create a three-pronged regional league setup consisting of East, North, and West regions (see "Organisation and regions").

Since the 2007–08 season, up to four Junior sides have been able to qualify for the Scottish Cup. The four teams are the three Superleague winners (West, East and North) and the Scottish Junior Cup winners, all from the previous season. In the 2015–16 season, Linlithgow Rose became the first junior team to reach the last 16 of the Scottish Cup after beating Forfar Athletic. (see "Juniors in the Scottish Cup").

In 2011, the Scottish Football Association created two new operational boards, Professional and Non-Professional, to provide more focused governance in these differing areas of the game. Junior football is represented on the Non-Professional Game Board alongside other organisations such as the East of Scotland Football League, South of Scotland Football League and Scottish Amateur Football Association.

== Name ==
The term "junior" does not relate to the age of players. Football for young players is generally known as "Youth" (up to Under-19) or "Juvenile" (which is to Under-21 level) football. In the late 19th century, membership of the SFA conferred "senior" status on a club and the junior grade developed outside the SFA framework. Today, the senior grade of football in Scotland is played in the Scottish Professional Football League (until 2013 divided into the Scottish Premier League and the Scottish Football League), as well as the six senior non-leagues: the Highland Football League, the Lowland Football League, the North Caledonian League the East of Scotland Football League, the South of Scotland Football League and the West of Scotland Football League. Over time, as various local football associations and leagues — both junior and senior — have risen in strength, or in some cases disappeared completely. Scottish football developed its current pattern with either junior or senior non-leagues taking precedence in various parts of the country with some occasional overlap. Nowadays, membership of the SJFA automatically confers on a club registered membership of the SFA; however, junior and senior non-league clubs still play in separate competitions.

Despite the lesser media coverage the juniors get, many of the club sides are fairly popular, and some of the bigger games (such as the local derbies between Arthurlie and Pollok, and Cumnock Juniors vs. Auchinleck Talbot) can attract attendances in the thousands. Crowds were far bigger in the past (76,000 for the Junior Cup Final in 1951, with nearly 90,000 watching the semi-finals (including a replay) compared to the level of support attracted now.

== Organisation and regions ==
The SJFA has 112 member clubs, comprising: Midlands League (19 clubs), North of Scotland League (33 clubs) in SJFA-administered leagues, as well as 52 West of Scotland League and 8 East of Scotland League teams who have retained their membership or rejoined the SJFA after moving leagues.

=== Member clubs ===
Midlands League (19)

Arbroath Victoria, Blairgowrie, Brechin Victoria, Broughty Athletic, Carnoustie Panmure, Coupar Angus, Downfield, Dundee North End, Dundee St. James, Dundee Violet, East Craigie, Forfar United, Forfar West End, Kirriemuir Thistle, Letham, Lochee Harp, Lochee United, Scone Thistle, Tayport

North of Scotland League (33)

Aberdeen East End, Aberdeen University, Banchory St Ternan, Banks O' Dee Juniors, Bridge of Don Thistle, Buchanhaven Hearts, Buckie Rovers, Burghead Thistle, Colony Park, Cruden Bay, Culter, Deveronside, Dufftown, Dyce, Ellon United, Forres Thistle, Fraserburgh United, Glentanar, Hall Russell United, Hermes, Islavale, Longside, Lossiemouth United, Maud, Montrose Roselea, Nairn St Ninian, New Elgin, Newmachar United, Rothie Rovers, Stonehaven, Stoneywood Parkvale, Sunnybank, Whitehills

East of Scotland League (8)

Armadale Thistle, Bathgate Thistle, Harthill Royal, Livingston United, Pumpherston, Stoneyburn, Syngenta ^{[SFA]}, West Calder United

West of Scotland League (52)

Ardeer Thistle, Ardrossan Winton Rovers, Arthurlie, Ashfield, Auchinleck Talbot ^{[SFA]}, Beith Juniors, Belshill Athletic, Benburb ^{[SFA]}, Blantyre Victoria, Cambuslang Rangers, Carluke Rovers, Craigmark Burntonians, Cumbernauld United, Cumnock Juniors ^{[SFA]}, Dalry Thistle, Darvel ^{[SFA]}, East Kilbride Thistle, Gartcairn, Glasgow Perthshire, Glasgow United, Glenafton Athletic, Greenock, Hurlford United, Irvine Meadow XI ^{[SFA]}, Irvine Victoria, Johnstone Burgh, Kilbirnie Ladeside, Kilsyth Rangers, Kirkintilloch Rob Roy, Lanark United, Largs Thistle, Larkhall Thistle, Lesmahagow, Lugar Boswell Thistle, Maryhill, Maybole, Muirkirk, Newmains United, Petershill, Rossvale, Royal Albert, Rutherglen Glencairn ^{[SFA]}, St. Anthony's, St. Roch's, Saltcoats Victoria, Shotts Bon Accord, Thorniewood United, Troon, Vale of Clyde, Vale of Leven, Wishaw, Yoker Athletic

Note

^{SFA} Club with an SFA Licence

=== League structure ===
Currently there are two regional junior league systems: the East Region with a single division and the North Region with two divisions. The top division of each region sits at tier 6 of the Scottish football league system, with a play-off enabling promotion to the Highland League for clubs with an SFA licence.

There was previously a West Region league system which contained 63 clubs at the end of the 2019–20 season, prior to its members leaving the Juniors to join a new West of Scotland Football League in the senior pyramid. 53 of those clubs kept their membership of the SJFA in order to enter the Scottish Junior Cup. A similar move had also greatly reduced the East Region's membership two years earlier when 25 clubs joined the East of Scotland Football League ahead of the 2018–19 season, with a further 20 clubs making the move over the next three years.

Tier	East Region (ERSJFA)	North Region (NRJFA)
6	Midlands League 19 clubs playing 36 games ↑ 1 promotion playoff spot to Highland League	North Region League Premier Division 14 clubs playing 26 games ↑ 1 promotion playoff spot to Highland League ↓ 2 relegation spots
7		North Region League Championship 16 clubs playing 30 games ↑ 4 promotion spots

==== Leagues by period ====
Before WWII								After WWII	1st re-organisation	2nd re-organisation	Pyramid
								Dumfries & District Amateur Junior League 1945–1951			
		Border Junior League 1912–1922		East of Scotland Junior League 1922–1929	Border Junior League 1926–1929						
Edinburgh & District Junior League 1892–1897	Leith & District League 1897–1898			East of Scotland Junior League 1922–1929	Midlothian Junior League 1929–1941			Edinburgh & District Junior League 1945–1968	East Region Junior League 1968–2002	SJFA East Region League 2002–2021	
		East of Scotland Junior League (Note: Named Edinburgh Junior League between 1904 and 1912, Lothian Junior League between 1915 and 1918.) 1904–1922		East of Scotland Junior League 1922–1929	Midlothian Junior League 1929–1941			Edinburgh & District Junior League 1945–1968	East Region Junior League 1968–2002	SJFA East Region League 2002–2021	
Midlothian Junior League 1892–1922				East of Scotland Junior League 1922–1929	Midlothian Junior League 1929–1941			Edinburgh & District Junior League 1945–1968	East Region Junior League 1968–2002	SJFA East Region League 2002–2021	
		Linlithgowshire Junior League 1904–1922		East of Scotland Junior League 1922–1929	Midlothian Junior League 1929–1941			Edinburgh & District Junior League 1945–1968	East Region Junior League 1968–2002	SJFA East Region League 2002–2021	
East Lothian Junior League 1893–1915				East of Scotland Junior League 1922–1929	Midlothian Junior League 1929–1941			Edinburgh & District Junior League 1945–1968	East Region Junior League 1968–2002	SJFA East Region League 2002–2021	
		Fife Junior League 1913–1919	Fife Junior League 1919–1921	Fife County Junior League 1921–1968					Fife Region Junior League 1968–2002	SJFA East Region League 2002–2021	
		Fife Junior League 1913–1919	West of Fife Junior League 1919–1921	Fife County Junior League 1921–1968					Fife Region Junior League 1968–2002	SJFA East Region League 2002–2021	
		East Neuk Junior League 1908–1922							Fife Region Junior League 1968–2002	SJFA East Region League 2002–2021	
	Angus Junior League (Note: Named Segell Challenge Cup League between 1897 and 1900, Forfar & Brechin Junior League between 1900 and 1901, Forfar & District Junior League between 1902 and 1930.) 1897–1969								Tayside Region Junior League (Note: Originally named Midland Region Junior League between 1969 and 1975.) 1969–2002	SJFA East Region League 2002–2021	Midlands League 2021–
Arbroath & District League 1893–1924									Tayside Region Junior League 1969–2002	SJFA East Region League 2002–2021	Midlands League 2021–
Montrose Junior League 1892–1906									Tayside Region Junior League 1969–2002	SJFA East Region League 2002–2021	Midlands League 2021–
		Kincardineshire Junior League 1907–1932			Montrose and Kincardineshire League 1932–1936	Montrose & Kincardineshire Junior League 1936–1939			Tayside Region Junior League 1969–2002	SJFA East Region League 2002–2021	Midlands League 2021–
								Kincardineshire Junior League (Note: Originally named Angus & Kincardineshire Junior League between 1946 and 1948.) 1946–1955	Tayside Region Junior League 1969–2002	SJFA East Region League 2002–2021	Midlands League 2021–
Dundee & District Junior League 1894–1969									Tayside Region Junior League 1969–2002	SJFA East Region League 2002–2021	Midlands League 2021–
						Perthshire Junior League (Note: Originally named Perth & District Junior League between 1928 and 1942.) 1928–1969			Tayside Region Junior League 1969–2002	SJFA East Region League 2002–2021	Midlands League 2021–
Perthshire Junior League (Note: Originally named Perth & District Junior League between 1899 and 1914.) 1899–1929									Tayside Region Junior League 1969–2002	SJFA East Region League 2002–2021	Midlands League 2021–
		Aberdeenshire & District Junior League 1901–1968							North Region Junior League 1968–2001	SJFA North Region League 2001–	
		Morayshire Junior League 1905–1968							North Region Junior League 1968–2001	SJFA North Region League 2001–	
		Buckie & District Junior League 1905–1936							North Region Junior League 1968–2001	SJFA North Region League 2001–	
			Ross-shire Junior League 1920–1945						North Region Junior League 1968–2001	SJFA North Region League 2001–	
	North of Scotland Junior League 1896–1935						North of Scotland Junior League 1935–1938		North Region Junior League 1968–2001	SJFA North Region League 2001–	
	North of Scotland Junior League 1896–1935						→ North of Scotland 2nd XI League 1935–		North Region Junior League 1968–2001	SJFA North Region League 2001–	
Kilmarnock & District Junior League 1895–1921									Ayrshire Region Junior League 1968–2002	SJFA West Region League 2002–2020	
Ayr & District Junior League 1896–1922				South Ayrshire Junior League (Note: Named Ayrshire Southern League between 1926 and 1928, Ayrshire Junior League between 1928 and 1931.) 1926–1932					Ayrshire Region Junior League 1968–2002	SJFA West Region League 2002–2020	
			South Ayrshire Junior League 1920–1926	South Ayrshire Junior League 1926–1932					Ayrshire Region Junior League 1968–2002	SJFA West Region League 2002–2020	
	Ayrshire Junior League 1899–1905								Ayrshire Region Junior League 1968–2002	SJFA West Region League 2002–2020	
		Cumnock & District Junior League 1902–1914							Ayrshire Region Junior League 1968–2002	SJFA West Region League 2002–2020	
		Irvine & District Junior League 1907–1920							Ayrshire Region Junior League 1968–2002	SJFA West Region League 2002–2020	
			Western Junior League 1919–1927		Western Intermediate League 1927–1931	Western League 1931–1968			Ayrshire Region Junior League 1968–2002	SJFA West Region League 2002–2020	
			Western Junior League 1919–1927						Central Region Junior League 1968–2002	SJFA West Region League 2002–2020	
	Renfrewshire Junior League (Note: Originally Named Western Junior League between 1898 and 1902.) 1897–1934								Central Region Junior League 1968–2002	SJFA West Region League 2002–2020	
Glasgow Junior League 1895–1927					Scottish Intermediate League 1927–1931	Scottish Central Junior League 1931–1968			Central Region Junior League 1968–2002	SJFA West Region League 2002–2020	
Lanarkshire Junior League 1891–1968									Central Region Junior League 1968–2002	SJFA West Region League 2002–2020	
	Stirlingshire Junior League (Note: Originally named Stirling & District Junior League between 1896 and 1901.) 1896–1927								Central Region Junior League 1968–2002	SJFA West Region League 2002–2020	
	Clackmannanshire Junior League 1896–1909								Central Region Junior League 1968–2002	SJFA West Region League 2002–2020	
	Dumbartonshire Junior League 1898–1913								Central Region Junior League 1968–2002	SJFA West Region League 2002–2020	
		Scottish Junior League 1908–1947							Central Region Junior League 1968–2002	SJFA West Region League 2002–2020	
						Campbeltown & District Junior League 1930–1940					

== Cup competitions ==
As well as the local leagues, there are a number of local cup competitions competed for; however, the biggest competition is the Scottish Junior Cup, which every junior club competes for annually, with the final generally held at the end of May. This cup was established in 1886. The final broadcast live on BBC Alba. The cup's sponsor for 18 years, until the start of the 2006–07 season, was OVD Demerara Rum, replaced at the semi-final stage of the 2006–07 competition by Scottish coach operator Citylink. The airline Emirates sponsored the tournament from 2009 to 2013 and ETHX Energy was the sponsor for 2015–16. The current tournament sponsor is Macron.

== Juniors in the Scottish Cup ==
The first attempt by the Scottish Football Association to allow Junior representation in the Scottish Cup was voted down in June 2005. In June 2007 however, the SFA did approve changes to the way that all non-league clubs entered the Scottish Cup. The North and South Qualifying Cups for full and associate member clubs in non-league football, which had both sent their four semi-finalists into the main competition, were scrapped and all these clubs now qualified automatically for the first round. In addition, the winners of the East of Scotland Football League, South of Scotland Football League and top two clubs in the Highland Football League all received a bye to the second round, even if that club was only a registered member of the SFA.

Further to this move, allowing registered member clubs to qualify for the Scottish Cup for the first time, it was announced that the winners of the Scottish Junior Cup, North Superleague, East Superleague and West of Scotland Super League Premier Division would qualify for the first round. This process has continued with the winners of the Scottish Amateur Cup qualifying for the first round from 2015 onwards. Girvan still qualified for the Scottish Cup from 2007 as a result of their historic full membership of the SFA. In 2014, they were joined as annual entrants to the competition by Banks O' Dee and Linlithgow Rose who achieved the SFA National Club Licensing criteria. Girvan themselves were awarded a National Club License in June 2016.

If a Junior club does a "double" by winning their respective Superleague championship and the Junior Cup, runners-up do not qualify and the Juniors are only represented by three qualifying entrants. This occurred in the 2007–08 Scottish Cup which was the first competition since the changes as Linlithgow Rose had won both league and cup. Rose performed the best of all three Junior qualifiers in this inaugural season, reaching the fourth round before losing to eventual finalists, Queen of the South. Of the other early entrants, Pollok defeated St Cuthbert Wanderers before taking Montrose to a replay in Glasgow, watched by 1,873 spectators. North champions Culter defeated two East of Scotland League clubs before losing to Highland League side Huntly in the third round.

In the 2008–09 competition, Banks O' Dee achieved the first double figure scoreline by a Junior club, with a 10–0 defeat of Highland League Fort William. This was bettered in the 2016–17 cup by Bonnyrigg Rose Athletic, whose 14–0 defeat of Burntisland Shipyard remains the largest margin of victory by a Junior side in the competition.

Irvine Meadow became the first Junior side to knock out Scottish Football League opposition in 2009, defeating Arbroath in the third round and became the first side to face Premier League opposition when they drew Hibernian in the next round. Linlithgow Rose's defeat of Forfar Athletic in the 2015–16 competition saw them become the first Junior side to reach the fifth round. In 2016-17 Bonnyrigg defeated Scottish Championship side Dumbarton away from home in the third Round.

In the intervening years, Junior clubs have had reasonable success with several clubs defeating Scottish Football League opposition. These results are listed below:

28 November 2009	Irvine Meadow	1−0	Arbroath	Irvine
	Barr 36'	Report		Stadium: Meadow Park; Attendance: 1,150

23 October 2010	Albion Rovers	0−1	Sunnybank	Coatbridge
15:00		Report	10' Gordon	Stadium: Cliftonhill Stadium; Attendance: 357

23 October 2010	Bo'ness United	2−1	Queen's Park	Bo'ness
	Fleming 45' (pen.); Shields 75'	Report	9' Brough	Stadium: Newtown Park; Attendance: 1,271

8 November 2014	Bo'ness United	5−4	Elgin City	Bo'ness
	Gribben 4', 31'; Snowdon 17'; Campbell 65'; Walker 77'	Report	11' (pen.), 42' Sutherland; 72' Nicolson; 88' Andrews	Stadium: Newtown Park; Attendance: 1,280

26 January 2016	Forfar Athletic	0−1 (a.e.t.)	Linlithgow Rose	Forfar
		Report	115' Kelbie	Stadium: Station Park; Attendance: 1,168

6 December 2016	Dumbarton	0–1	Bonnyrigg Rose	Dumbarton
19:45		Flashscores.com	Nelson 86'	Stadium: Dumbarton Football Stadium; Attendance: 632

19 January 2019	Auchinleck Talbot	1–0	Ayr United	Auchinleck
12:15	McCracken 78'	Report		Stadium: Beechwood Park; Attendance: 3,100; Referee: Euan Anderson

19 October 2019	Auchinleck Talbot	1–0	Cove Rangers	Auchinleck
14:30	Hyslop 88'			Stadium: Beechwood Park; Attendance: 750; Referee: Kevin Graham

== Scotland Junior international team ==
Scotland Juniors
- Head coach: Keith Burgess
- Captain: Craig Pettigrew
- Most caps: Bert McNab (12)
- Top scorer: George Wilson (7); Dennis Gray (7)
First colours

First international
- Scotland 10–1 England (Hamilton, Scotland; 11 May 1889)

Biggest win
- Scotland 11–0 Ireland (Glasgow, Scotland; 15 February 1890)

Biggest defeat
- England 5–0 Scotland (Wolverhampton, England; 9 April 1927)

Juniors also play internationally, with the best players being picked to play for the Scottish Junior international team against other countries' non-league select teams. The Umbro-sponsored Junior International Quadrangular Tournament takes place every two years and is contested between teams from Scotland, the Republic of Ireland, Northern Ireland and the Isle of Man. The tournament is hosted in turn by each country, with matches taking place at the larger junior grounds in the host country, such as Dunterlie Park, Pollok's Newlandsfield and Petershill Park when the tournament was held in Scotland in 2005. The team's most capped player is Bert McNab, of Petershill, who won 12 caps between 1951 and 1955.

The team have been led since 2008 by former Glenrothes, Tayport and Kelty manager, Keith Burgess.

=== Team history ===
After the formation of the Scottish Junior Football Association in 1886, officials began to explore opportunities for representative international matches. On receipt of a £17 guarantee, the Lancashire Junior League in England agreed to raise a team, and on 11 May 1889 the first junior international was played at Douglas Park, Hamilton, with Scotland winning 10–1. A return fixture could not be arranged as the Lancashire league could not provide a sufficient guarantee.

On 15 February 1890, Scotland played their first match against Ireland at Hibernian Park, Glasgow. The 11–0 scoreline in the hosts' favour remains a record victory for the Scottish Junior international team. This fixture did become an annual event, and on 14 February 1891 the team travelled to Belfast for their first away match, a 1–1 draw at Ulsterville, the home of Linfield.

In 1894, games against England resumed with a fixture against Birmingham & District Counties F.A. in Leamington. These games continued until World War II, then were revived for a short period in the 1970s. Scotland suffered a record 5–0 defeat in the 1927 fixture at Molineux, Wolverhampton. Games against Wales began in 1912 with a fixture against a representative side of the North Wales Coast F.A, the first game taking place in Bangor on 13 April, Scotland winning 2–1.

In 1920, the Scottish Junior international side created history by being the first representative football side from Scotland to undertake a foreign tour. In June, a party of 13 players and three officials visited Norway and played three games each in Stavanger and Bergen. The full Scottish national side did not play a match outwith the British Isles until 1929 when they also travelled to Norway.

A game against the Irish Free State was played on 9 March 1929 in Dublin with Scotland winning 2–1 but regular games against a Republic of Ireland side did not begin until 1947. The first game in this series was played at Dalymount Park, Dublin on 25 May, with Scotland winning 3–2.

In September 1975, the team travelled to Osnabrück, West Germany, to play three matches against a BAOR Select side, winning two of the games.

The number of games against the different home nations has varied in regularity over the years. From 1958 until 1967, Northern Ireland were Scotland's only opponents, while in the 1970s there was an eight-year gap between the two sides meeting. Currently, games against England and Wales are in abeyance, and the team contest the biannual Quadrangular Tournament with friendly and testimonial matches arranged intermittently in the intervening seasons.

=== Current squad ===
The following players were selected for the Junior International Quadrangular Tournament which was held in Glasgow, from 11 to 14 October 2017.

Position	Name	Club
GK	Richie Barnard	Linlithgow Rose
GK	Andy Leishman	Auchinleck Talbot
DF	Jonathan Brown	Bonnyrigg Rose Athletic
DF	Nicky Docherty	Beith Juniors
DF	Andy Forbes	Penicuik Athletic
DF	Dean Hoskins	Bonnyrigg Rose Athletic
DF	Colin Leiper (withdrew)	Linlithgow Rose
DF	Richie McKillen (withdrew)	Hurlford United
DF	Ewan Moyes	Bonnyrigg Rose Athletic
DF	Craig Pettigrew	Auchinleck Talbot
DF	Mark Sideserf	Pollok
MF	Ross Brash	Pollok
MF	Paul Burns	Cumnock Juniors
MF	Phil Johnston	Clydebank
MF	Lewis Mackenzie	Dundonald Bluebell
MF	Gary McCann	Pollok
MF	Colin Spence	Arthurlie
MF	Bryan Young	Pollok
FW	Bryan Boylan	Kilwinning Rangers
FW	David McKenna	Beith Juniors
FW	Keir Milliken	Beith Juniors
FW	Graham Wilson	Auchinleck Talbot

=== Notable players ===
The following list, with one exception, notes players who all went on to gain full international honours for Scotland after winning junior international caps, the junior club with which they played at the time and the year of their junior cap.

Bob Foyers was a member of the team which played the first ever Scotland Junior international fixture in May 1889, and after joining St Bernard's the following year, became the first dual Junior/Senior international in 1893 when capped against Wales.

Harry Rennie earned his Junior cap as a defender and signed for Morton as such, but became a goalkeeper aged 23 in 1897 and won ten Senior caps in his new position.

The highest number of players from a Junior international match to go on to win Senior caps is four. In April 1896, Hugh Morgan, Willie Muir, Tommy Low and Bobby Walker, helped Scotland defeat England 4–0 at Aston Villa's Wellington Road ground. A further six players from the team also stepped up to Senior football.

The one exception noted on the list is Paul Wilson. The former Celtic forward was capped in 1980 after his Senior career while turning out for Blantyre Celtic, alongside another former Celt and dual international, Jimmy Johnstone.

Two players also received full caps for other nations after playing for Scotland Juniors: Archie Blue for Australia and Tommy O'Hara for the United States.

Name	Club	Year(s)
Bob Foyers	Burnbank Swifts	1889
Nicol Smith	Darvel Juniors	1893
John Fyfe	South Western	1893
Harry Rennie	Greenock Volunteers	1895
Hugh Morgan	Longriggend Wanderers	1896
Willie Muir	Glenbuck Athletic	1896
Tommy Low	Parkhead	1896
Bobby Walker	Dalry Primrose	1896
Bobby Templeton	Kilmarnock Rugby XI	1898
David Lindsay	Rutherglen Glencairn	1899
Jimmy Raeside	Parkhead	1899
Donald Colman	Maryhill	1899–1903
George Key	Parkhead	1899
Willie Lennie	Maryhill	1901
Alec Bennett	Rutherglen Glencairn	1902–1903
Andrew Richmond	Parkhead	1903
Jimmy Lawrence	Glasgow Perthshire	1904
Jimmy Croal	Falkirk Juniors	1905
Jimmy Brownlie	Blantyre Victoria	1906
William Key	Vale of Clyde	1899
Jimmy Gordon	Renfrew Victoria	1907
Andy Cunningham	Newmilns	1908
Peter Nellies	Douglas Water Thistle	1908
Kenny Campbell	Cambuslang Rangers	1911
Tommy McInally	St Anthony's	1919
John Gilchrist	St Anthony's	1919
Jimmy Dunn	St Anthony's	1920
James Hamilton	Vale of Clyde	1922
Dougie Gray	Mugiemoss	1925
Benny Yorston	Mugiemoss	1925
Jimmy Connor	Glasgow Perthshire	1926
Danny Liddle	Wallyford Bluebell	1929
Scot Symon	Dundee Violet	1930
Matt Armstrong	Port Glasgow Athletic	1931
Bobby Hogg	Royal Albert	1931
Johnny Crum	Ashfield	1932
Bobby Beattie	Kilwinning Rangers	1933
Frank Murphy	Maryhill Hibernians	1933
Jock Brown	Prestwick Glenburn Rovers / Shawfield	1934 / 1935
John Kelly	Arthurlie	1939
Bobby Dougan	Shawfield	1947
Johnny Anderson	Arthurlie	1948
Dave Mackay	Newtongrange Star	1953
George Mulhall	Kilsyth Rangers	1953
Alex Scott	Bo'ness United	1953–1955
Andy Weir	Arthurlie	1955
Pat Quinn	Bridgeton Waverley	1956
Paddy Crerand	Duntocher Hibernian	1958
Stevie Chalmers	Ashfield	1959
Jim Scott	Bo'ness United	1959
Jimmy Johnstone	Blantyre Celtic	1962
John "Dixie" Deans	Neilston Juniors	1965
Drew Jarvie	Kilsyth Rangers	1967
Willie Pettigrew	East Kilbride Thistle	1973
Ian Wallace	Yoker Athletic	1974
Paul Wilson	Blantyre Celtic	1980
Brian Martin	Shotts Bon Accord	1983

== Tournament records ==
=== Quadrangular Tournament ===
Year	Host nation	Round	Position	GP	W	D	L	GS	GA
1993–94	Republic of Ireland	Final	1st	2	2	0	0	3	1
1994–95	Scotland	Final	2nd	2	1	0	1	7	4
1995–96	Isle of Man	3rd place play-off	3rd	2	1	0	1	4	1
1996–97	Northern Ireland	Final	1st	2	2	0	0	6	3
1997–98	Republic of Ireland	3rd place play-off	3rd	2	1	0	1	4	2
1998–99	Scotland	Final	2nd	2	1	1	0	5	1
1999–00	Isle of Man	Final	2nd	2	1	0	1	2	3
2000–01^{1}	Northern Ireland	–	2nd	3	2	0	1	5	2
2003–04	Republic of Ireland	–	1st	3	1	2	0	6	4
2004–05	Scotland	–	1st	3	2	0	1	4	1
2007–08	Isle of Man	–	1st	3	2	1	0	8	6
2009–10	Northern Ireland	–	1st	3	2	1	0	6	3
2013	Republic of Ireland	–	2nd	3	2	0	1	10	4
2017	Scotland	–	2nd	3	2	1	0	5	3
Total				35	22	6	7	75	38

^{1}Round-robin tournament format used from 2000–01 onwards.
