= Vale of Clyde F.C. =

Association football club in Scotland

Vale of Clyde
- Full name: Vale of Clyde Football Club
- Nickname: Tin Pail
- Founded: 1873 (contemporary sources suggest 1885)
- Ground: Fullarton Park, Glasgow
- Capacity: 3,000 (150 seats)
- Coordinates: 55°50′20″N 4°10′12″W
- Manager: John Hughes
Home colours	Away colours

Vale of Clyde Football Club are a Scottish football club based in the East End of Glasgow. Nicknamed Tin Pail, the club officially date their founding in 1873, although contemporary press reports don't actually date the club until 1885, and is based at Fullarton Park in the Fullarton neighbourhood (near to Tollcross and Auchenshuggle). Since the leagues were reconstructed in 2002, Vale of Clyde have played in various divisions in the West Region of the Scottish Junior Football Association but now play in the West of Scotland League Premier Division. The team colours are blue, red and white.

Possibly the oldest Junior club still in existence and certainly among the oldest handful, the club were one of the most successful sides in the game's early era and won the Scottish Junior Cup on three occasions as well as several prominent regional competitions, although since World War II they have won little and existed as a minor presence.

In 2020, it was confirmed that Vale of Clyde (along with the 62 other West Region Junior clubs) had successfully applied to join the new West of Scotland Football League in the senior pyramid.

== Honours ==
=== Scottish Junior Cup ===
- Winners: 1890–91, 1892–93, 1903–04
- Runners-up: 1941–42

=== West of Scotland Football League ===
- Third Division winners: 2022–23

=== Other honours ===
- Glasgow Junior Football League winners: 1899–1900, 1912–13, 1917–18, 1919–20
- Glasgow Junior Cup: 1891–92, 1892–93, 1897–98, 1917–18
- Glasgow Dryburgh Cup: 1933–34
- Central League Cup: 1988–89
- Evening Times Cup Winners Cup: 1989–90
- Central League Division One winners 2004–05
