= Petershill F.C. =

Association football club in Glasgow City, Scotland

Petershill
- Full name: Petershill Football Club
- Nickname: Peasy
- Founded: 1897
- Ground: New Petershill Park, Glasgow
- Capacity: 2000 (562 seated)
- Coordinates: 55°52′40″N 4°13′47″W
- Chairman: John Murray
- Manager: Martin Lauchlan
- League: West of Scotland League First Division
- 2025–26: West of Scotland League First Division, 11th of 16
Home colours	Away colours

Petershill Football Club are a Scottish football club from Springburn in the north of Glasgow. Nicknamed the Peasy, they were formed in 1897 and are traditionally one of the stronger clubs at their level, although they have not been as successful in recent years as they have been historically.

They play at New Petershill Park: a modern stadium with a capacity of 2,000 including a 562 all-seated stand. Petershill currently compete in the West of Scotland League First Division. The colours of their strip are maroon and white.

An unrelated senior club also named Petershill operated in Springburn between 1877 and 1883 and participated in the early Scottish Cup seasons, before merging with Northern; the year of Northern's subsequent dissolution was 1897, the same as the formation of Petershill, albeit the club history does not mention any link to Northern, nor to Cowlairs, another former SFL team in Springburn which had folded in 1896.

The club share a healthy rivalry with Maryhill.

== Current squad ==
As of 17 August 2023

Note: Flags indicate national team as defined under FIFA eligibility rules; some limited exceptions apply. Players may hold more than one non-FIFA nationality.

No.	Pos.	Nation	Player
—	GK	SCO	KP McAllister
—	GK	SCO	Steven McNeil
—	DF	SCO	Lorenzo Giovanazzi
—	DF	SCO	Joe Campbell
—	DF	SCO	Luke Ramsay
—	DF	SCO	Ross McCabe
—	DF	SCO	Craig McGregor
—	MF	SCO	Paul Fee
—	MF	SCO	Darren Miller
—	MF	SCO	Dom Morgan
—	MF	SCO	PJ McGiff

No.	Pos.	Nation	Player
—	MF	SCO	Willie Robertson
—	MF	SCO	Jamie Adam
—	MF	SCO	Jordan Marshall
—	MF	SCO	Kyle McLachlan
—	FW	SCO	Thomas Sinclair
—	FW	SCO	Cammy McNeil
—	FW	SCO	Lennon Houston
—	FW	SCO	Ryan Thomson
—	FW	SCO	Del Hepburn {{fs
—	FW	SCO	Craig Methven player|nat=SCO|pos=FW|name=Connor Higgins}}(on loan from Clydebank)

== Honours ==
Scottish Junior Cup

- Winners: 1911–12, 1915–16, 1917–18, 1950–51, 1955–56
- Runners-up: 1910–11, 1934–35, 1948–49, 1984–85

SJFA West of Scotland Super League First Division

- Winners: 2017–18

West of Scotland League

- Conference C winners: 2021–22

Other Honours

- West of Scotland Cup winners: 1951–52, 1957–58, 1968–69, 1995–96, 2006–07
- Central League champions: 1932–33, 1938–39, 1939–40, 1951–52, 1955–56, 1963–64, 1968–69
- Central League A Division winners: 1968–69
- Central League Premier Division winners: 1982–83, 1983–84, 1989–90, 1992–93
- Glasgow Junior Cup: 1903–04, 1912–13, 1933–34, 1943–44, 1949–50, 1954–55, 1960–61, 1964–65
- Glasgow Dryburgh Cup: 1950–51, 1951–52, 1964–65
- Central League Cup: 1973–74, 1974–75, 1991–92, 2009–10
- Central (Beatons Coaches) Sectional League Cup: 1977–78, 1981–82, 1994–95
- Evening Times Cup Winners Cup: 1991–92

== Former players ==
1. Players that have played/managed in the Scottish Football League or any foreign equivalent to this level (i.e. fully professional league).
2. Players with full international caps.
3. Players that hold a club record or have captained the club.

- (Scotland) Torrance Gillick
- (Scotland) James Greechan
- (Scotland) Alex Massie
- (Scotland) John McKenzie
- (Scotland) Benny Rooney
- (Scotland) Ryan Scully
- (Scotland) Willie Clark
