= List of Scottish Junior Football Association clubs =

The Scottish Junior Football Association is affiliated to the Scottish Football Association and administers the Junior grade of association football in Scotland. The following is a list of Scottish Junior Football Association clubs, it does however include clubs which have moved to senior leagues and have remained SJFA members, allowing them to continue competing in the Scottish Junior Cup. Clubs that currently play in the Scottish Professional Football League are listed with a grey background.

Club names in bold are currently members of the Scottish Junior Football Association. Clubs in italics are currently in abeyance while in continued membership of the SJFA.

Name	Region	Location	Founded	Ground	Notable players
25th Old Boys	Defunct (1964)	Aberdeen	1946		Category:25th Old Boys F.C. players
**Aberdeen East End**	**North**	**Aberdeen**	**1887**	**New Advocates Park**	Category:East End F.C. players
Aberdeen Lads Club	Defunct (2009)	Aberdeen	1950	Jamieson Park	Category:Aberdeen Lads Club F.C. players
Aberdeen South United	Defunct (1964)	Aberdeen	1880	Jamieson Park	Category:Aberdeen South United F.C. players
**Aberdeen University**	**North**	**Aberdeen**	**1889**	**Hillhead Centre**	Category:Aberdeen University F.C. players
Alness United	Moved to Amateur (1936)	Alness		Dalmore Park	Category:Alness United F.C. players
Alyth United	Defunct (1981)	Alyth	1928	Diamond Jubilee Park	Category:Alyth United F.C. players
Alva Albion Rangers	Defunct (1962)	Alva	1893	Greenhead Park	Category:Alva Albion Rangers F.C. players
Annan Athletic	In abeyance after Dumfries & District Amateur Junior FA disbanded (1951)	Annan	1942	Galabank	Category:Annan Athletic F.C. players
**Annbank United**	Moved to West of Scotland League (2020)	Annbank	1939	New Pebble Park	Category:Annbank United F.C. players
Arbroath Ashdale	Defunct (1959)	Arbroath	1945	Lower Gayfield	Category:Arbroath Ashdale F.C. players
Arbroath Sporting Club	Defunct (2011)	Arbroath	1959	Seaton Park	Category:Arbroath Sporting Club players
**Arbroath Victoria**	**East**	**Arbroath**	**1882**	**Ogilvy Park**	Category:Arbroath Victoria F.C. players
Ardeer Recreation	Moved to Ayrshire Amateur Football Association (1968)	Stevenston	1929	Recreation Park	Category:Ardeer Recreation F.C. players
**Ardeer Thistle**	Moved to West of Scotland League (2020)	Stevenston	1900	Ardeer Stadium	Category:Ardeer Thistle F.C. players
**Ardrossan Winton Rovers**	Moved to West of Scotland League (2020)	Ardrossan	1900	Winton Park	Category:Ardrossan Winton Rovers F.C. players
**Armadale Thistle**	Moved to East of Scotland League (2021)	Armadale	1936	Volunteer Park	Category:Armadale Thistle F.C. players
Arniston Rangers	Moved to East of Scotland League (2018)	Gorebridge	1878	Newbyres Park	Category:Arniston Rangers F.C. players
**Arthurlie**	Moved to West of Scotland League (2020)	Barrhead	1874	Dunterlie Park	Category:Arthurlie F.C. players
**Ashfield**	Moved to West of Scotland League (2020)	Possilpark	1886	Saracen Park	Category:Ashfield F.C. players
**Auchinleck Talbot**	Moved to West of Scotland League (2020)	Auchinleck	1909	Beechwood Park	Category:Auchinleck Talbot F.C. players
Baillieston Juniors	Defunct (2005)	Baillieston	1919	Station Park	Category:Baillieston Juniors F.C. players
Balbeggie	Defunct (2005)	Balbeggie	1970	Redfield Park	Category:Balbeggie F.C. players
Balgonie Scotia	Moved to Amateur (1954)	Coaltown of Balgonie	1896	School Park	Category:Balgonie Scotia F.C. players
Ballingry Rovers	Defunct (2014)	Glencraig	1952	Ore Park	Category:Ballingry Rovers F.C. players
**Banchory St. Ternan**	**North**	**Banchory**	**1992**	**Milton Park**	Category:Banchory St. Ternan F.C. players
Bankfoot Athletic	Defunct (2014)	Bankfoot	1919	Coronation Park	Category:Bankfoot Athletic F.C. players
**Banks O' Dee**	**North**	**Aberdeen**	**1902**	**Spain Park**	Category:Banks o' Dee F.C. players
**Bathgate Thistle**	Moved to East of Scotland League (2021)	Bathgate	1937	Creamery Park	Category:Bathgate Thistle F.C. players
Bedlay	Defunct (1952)	Annathill	1912	School Park	Category:Bedlay F.C. players
**Beith Juniors**	Moved to West of Scotland League (2020)	Beith	1938	Bellsdale Park	Category:Beith Juniors F.C. players
Bellshill Athletic	Moved to West of Scotland League (2020)	Bellshill	1897	Rockburn Park	Category:Bellshill Athletic F.C. players
**Benburb**	Moved to West of Scotland League (2020)	Govan	1900	New Tinto Park	Category:Benburb F.C. players
Bishopmill United	Defunct (2014)	Elgin	1882	Pinefield	Category:Bishopmill United F.C. players
Blackburn United	Moved to East of Scotland League (2018)	Blackburn	1978	New Murrayfield Park	Category:Blackburn United F.C. players
**Blairgowrie**	**East**	**Blairgowrie and Rattray**	**1946**	**Davie Park**	Category:Blairgowrie F.C. players
Blantyre Celtic	Defunct (1992)	Blantyre	1914	Craighead Park	Category:Blantyre Celtic F.C. players
**Blantyre Victoria**	Moved to West of Scotland League (2020)	Blantyre	1890	Castle Park	Category:Blantyre Victoria F.C. players
Bo'ness Athletic	Moved to East of Scotland League (2021)	Bo'ness	2019	Newtown Park	Category:Bo'ness Athletic F.C. players
Bo'ness United	Moved to East of Scotland League (2018)	Bo'ness	1945	Newtown Park	Category:Bo'ness United F.C. players
Bon Accord Juniors	Defunct (1997)	Aberdeen	1986	Keith Park	Category:Bon Accord Juniors F.C. players
Bonnybridge Juniors	Defunct (2003)	Bonnybridge	1948	Duncan Stewart Memorial Park	Category:Bonnybridge Juniors F.C. players
Bonnyrigg Rose	Moved to East of Scotland League (2018)	Bonnyrigg	1890	New Dundas Park	Category:Bonnyrigg Rose F.C. players
Brechin Matrix	Defunct (1969)	Brechin	1944	Matrix Park	Category:Brechin Matrix F.C. players
**Brechin Victoria**	**East**	**Brechin**	**1917**	**Victoria Park**	Category:Brechin Victoria F.C. players
**Bridge of Don Thistle**	**North**	**Aberdeen**	**1983**	**Aberdeen Sports Village**	Category:Bridge of Don Thistle F.C. players
Bridgeton Waverley	Defunct (1962)	Glasgow	1924	New Barrowfield Park	Category:Bridgeton Waverley F.C. players
**Broughty Athletic**	**East**	**Dundee**	**1920**	**Whitton Park**	Category:Broughty Athletic F.C. players
Broxburn Athletic	Moved to East of Scotland League (2018)	Broxburn	1948	Albyn Park	Category:Broxburn Athletic F.C. players
Bonnyton Thistle	Moved to Amateur (1914)	Kilmarnock	1912	The Synergy Arena	Category:Bonnyton Thistle F.C. players
**Buchanhaven Hearts**	**North**	**Peterhead**	**1908**	**Raemoss Park**	Category:Buchanhaven Hearts F.C. players
**Buckie Rovers**	**North**	**Buckie**	**1889**	**Merson Park**	Category:Buckie Rovers F.C. players
Buckie Thistle	Moved to Highland League (1909)	Buckie	1886	Victoria Park	Category:Buckie Thistle F.C. players
**Burghead Thistle**	**North**	**Burghead**	**1889**	**Forest Park**	Category:Burghead Thistle F.C. players
Burnbank Athletic	Defunct (1962)	Hamilton	1885	Russell Park	Category:Burnbank Athletic F.C. players
Caberfeidh	Defunct (1988)	New Elgin	1972	Dovecote Park	Category:Caberfeidh F.C. players
**Caledonian Locomotives**	Moved to West of Scotland League (2020)	Springburn	1976	Petershill Park	Category:Caledonian Locomotives F.C. players
Cambuslang Hibernian	Defunct (1908)	Cambuslang	1884	Westburn Park	Category:Cambuslang Hibernian F.C. players
**Cambuslang Rangers**	Moved to West of Scotland League (2020)	Cambuslang	1899	Somervell Park	Category:Cambuslang Rangers F.C. players
Camelon Juniors	Moved to East of Scotland League (2018)	Camelon	1920	Carmuirs Park	Category:Camelon Juniors F.C. players
Campbeltown Hearts	In abeyance after Campbeltown & District Junior FA disbanded (1939)	Campbeltown	1934	Kintyre Park	Category:Campbeltown Hearts F.C. players
Campbeltown United	In abeyance after Campbeltown & District Junior FA disbanded (1939)	Campbeltown	1929	Kintyre Park	Category:Campbeltown United F.C. players
Canonbie	Moved to Senior (1914)	Canonbie	1887		Category:Canonbie F.C. players
**Carluke Rovers**	Moved to West of Scotland League (2020)	Carluke	1887	John Cumming Stadium	Category:Carluke Rovers F.C. players
**Carnoustie Panmure**	**East**	**Carnoustie**	**1936**	**Laing Park**	Category:Carnoustie Panmure F.C. players
Castlehill Colliery	Defunct (1975)	Blairhall	1920	Woodside Park	Category:Castlehill Colliery F.C. players
Cattofield	Defunct (1961)	Aberdeen	1901	Cattofield Park	Category:Cattofield F.C. players
Chirnside United	Moved to Border Amateur League (1930)	Chirnside	1890	Comrades Park	Category:Chirnside United F.C. players
Civil Service Strollers	Moved to Border Senior League (1922)	Edinburgh	1908	Christie Gillies Park	Category:Civil Service Strollers F.C. players
Clackmannan	Defunct (1995)	Clackmannan	1961	King George V Park	Category:Clackmannan F.C. players
Cleland	Defunct (1960)	Cleland	1938	Corn Park	Category:Cleland F.C. players
Clydebank	Moved to West of Scotland League (2020)	Clydebank	2003	Holm Park	Category:Clydebank F.C. players
Clydebank Juniors	Merged with East Stirlingshire (Scottish League) (1964)	Clydebank	1899	New Kilbowie Park	Category:Clydebank Juniors F.C. players
**Colony Park**	**North**	**Inverurie**	**1978**	**Colony Park**	Category:Colony Park F.C. players
Coltness United	Defunct (1966)	Newmains	1898	Victoria Park	Category:Coltness United F.C. (1898) players
Comrie Colliery	Defunct (1988)	Steelend	1946	Woodside Park	Category:Comrie Colliery F.C. players
Corinthians	Defunct (1966)	Peterhead	1964		Category:Corinthians F.C. (Scotland) players
**Coupar Angus**	**East**	**Coupar Angus**	**1935**	**Foxhall Park**	Category:Coupar Angus F.C. players
Cove Rangers	Moved to Highland League (1986)	Aberdeen	1922	Balmoral Stadium	Category:Cove Rangers F.C. players
Cowal	Defunct (1976)	Dunoon	1922	Black Park	Category:Cowal F.C. players
**Craigmark Burntonians**	Moved to West of Scotland League (2020)	Dalmellington	1946	Station Park	Category:Craigmark Burntonians F.C. players
Craigroyston	Moved to East of Scotland League (2018)	Edinburgh	1976	St Mark's Park	Category:Edinburgh C.F.C. players
Crichton Royal Infirmary	Moved to Amateur (1951)	Dumfries	1888	Crichton Park	Category:Crichton Royal Infirmary F.C. players
Crieff Earngrove	Defunct (1927)	Crieff	1981	Market Park	Category:Crieff Earngrove Infirmary F.C. players
Crombie Sports	Defunct (2007)	Aberdeen	1986	Grandholm Park	Category:Crombie Sports F.C. players
Crossgates Primrose	Moved to East of Scotland League (2018)	Crossgates	1887	Humbug Park	Category:Crossgates Primrose J.F.C. players
**Cruden Bay**	**North**	**Cruden Bay**	**1934**	**Watson Park**	Category:Cruden Bay F.C. players
**Culter**	**North**	**Peterculter**	**1891**	**Crombie Park**	Category:Culter F.C. players
**Cumbernauld United**	Moved to West of Scotland League (2020)	Cumbernauld	1964	Guy's Meadow	Category:Cumbernauld United F.C. players
Cuminestown	Defunct (1994)	Cuminestown	1971	Tennant Park	Category:Cuminestown F.C. players
**Cumnock Juniors**	Moved to West of Scotland League (2020)	Cumnock	1912	Townhead Park	Category:Cumnock Juniors F.C. players
Dalkeith Thistle	Moved to East of Scotland League (2018)	Dalkeith	1892	Kings Park	Category:Dalkeith Thistle F.C. players
**Dalry Thistle**	Moved to West of Scotland League (2020)	Dalry	1920	Merksworth Park	Category:Dalry Thistle F.C. players
Dalziel Rovers	Defunct (1910)	Motherwell	1892	Meadow Park	Category:Dalziel Rovers F.C. players
Darvel	Moved to West of Scotland League (2020)	Darvel	1889	Recreation Park	Category:Darvel F.C. players
Dennistoun Waverley	Defunct (1968)	Glasgow	1939	Haghill Park	Category:Dennistoun Waverley F.C. players
Denny Hibernian	Defunct (1934)	Denny	1907	School Loan	Category:Denny Hibernian F.C. players
**Deveronside**	**North**	**Banff**	**1977**	**Canal Park**	Category:Deveronside F.C. players
Douglas Water Thistle	Defunct (1962)	Douglas Water	1899	Welfare Sports Ground	Category:Douglas Water Thistle F.C. players
Douglasdale	Defunct (1962)	Douglas	1927	Barnhill Park	Category:Douglasdale F.C. players
**Downfield**	**East**	**Dundee**	**1904**	**Downfield Park**	Category:Downfield F.C. players
Dreghorn	Defunct (1969)	Dreghorn	1949	Fordside Park	Category:Dreghorn F.C. players
Drumlemble	Defunct (1962)	Kintyre	1920	Fordside Park	Category:Drumlemble F.C. players
**Dufftown**	**North**	**Dufftown**	**1890**	**Westburn Park**	Category:Dufftown F.C. players
Dunfermline Athletic	Moved to Northern League (1902)	Dunfermline	1885		Category:Dunfermline Athletic F.C. players
Dunbar United	Moved to East of Scotland League (2018)	Dunbar	1925	New Countess Park	Category:Dunbar United F.C. players
Dundee Arnot	Defunct (1960)	Dundee	1892	Eastfield Park	Category:Dundee Arnot F.C. players
**Dundee North End**	**East**	**Dundee**	**1895**	**North End Park**	Category:Dundee North End F.C. players
Dundee Osborne	Defunct (1983)	Dundee	1910	East End Park	Category:Dundee Osborne F.C. players
**Dundee St James**	**East**	**Dundee**	**2017**	**Fairfield Park**	Category:Dundee St James F.C. players
Dundee St Joseph's	Defunct (1999)	Dundee	1904	Midmill Park	Category:Dundee St Joseph's F.C. players
**Dundee Violet**	**East**	**Dundee**	**1883**	**Glenesk Park**	Category:Dundee Violet F.C. players
Dundonald Bluebell	Moved to East of Scotland League (2018)	Cardenden	1938	Moorside Park	Category:Dundonald Bluebell F.C. players
Dunipace	Moved to East of Scotland League (2018)	Denny	1888	Westfield Park	Category:Dunipace F.C. players
Duntocher Hibernian	Defunct (1980)	Duntocher	1894	Glenhead Park	Category:Duntocher Hibernian F.C. players
**Dyce Juniors**	**North**	**Dyce**	**1989**	**Ian Mair Park**	Category:Dyce F.C. players
**East Craigie**	**East**	**Dundee**	**1880**	**Craigie Park**	Category:East Craigie F.C. players
Easthouses & Mayfield United	Defunct (1969)	Easthouses	1966		Category:Easthouses & Mayfield United F.C. players
Easthouses Lily Miners Welfare	Moved to East of Scotland League (2018)	Easthouses	1969	Newbattle Complex	Category:Easthouses Lily Miners Welfare F.C. players
**East Kilbride Thistle**	Moved to West of Scotland League (2020)	East Kilbride	1968	The Showpark	Category:East Kilbride Thistle F.C. players
Edinburgh United	Moved to East of Scotland League (2018)	Edinburgh	1985	Paties Road Stadium	Category:Edinburgh United F.C. players
**Ellon United**	**North**	**Ellon**	**1890**	**The Meadows**	Category:Ellon United F.C. players
Elmwood	Defunct (2005)	Dundee	1986	Glenesk Park	Category:Elmwood F.C. (Scotland) players
Errol	Moved to Perthshire Amateur Football Association (1974)	Errol	1936	Public Park	Category:Errol F.C. players
Falkirk Juniors	Defunct (2016)	Grangemouth	2011	Grangemouth Stadium	Category:Falkirk Juniors F.C. players
**Fauldhouse United**	Moved to East of Scotland League (2021)	Fauldhouse	1919	Park View	Category:Fauldhouse United F.C. players
Fochabers	Defunct (2017)	Fochabers	1983	Fochabers Pavilion	Category:Fochabers F.C. players
**Forfar United**	**East**	**Forfar**	**1974**	**Guthrie Park**	Category:Forfar Albion F.C. players
**Forfar West End**	**East**	**Forfar**	**1892**	**Strathmore Park**	Category:Forfar West End F.C. players
Formartine United	Moved to Highland League (2009)	Pitmedden	1948	North Lodge Park	Category:Formartine United F.C. players
**Forres Thistle**	**North**	**Forres**	**1906**	**Logie Park**	Category:Forres Thistle F.C. players
Forth Wanderers	Moved to West of Scotland League (2020)	Forth	1904	Kingshill Park	Category:Forth Wanderers F.C. players
Frances Colliery	Defunct (1979)	Coaltown of Wemyss	1957	School Park	Category:Frances Colliery F.C. players
**Fraserburgh United**	**North**	**Fraserburgh**	**1976**	**College Park**	Category:Fraserburgh United F.C. players
**Gartcairn**	Moved to West of Scotland League (2020)	Airdrie	2015	MTC Park	Category:Gartcairn F. A. Juniors players
**Girvan**	Moved to West of Scotland League (2020)	Girvan	1947	Hamilton Park	Category:Girvan F.C. players
**Glasgow Perthshire**	Moved to West of Scotland League (2020)	Possilpark	1890	Keppoch Park	Category:Glasgow Perthshire F.C. players
**Glasgow United** (known as Shettleston until 2021)	Moved to West of Scotland League (2020)	Shettleston	1903	Greenfield Park	Category:Glasgow United F.C. players
**Glenafton Athletic**	Moved to West of Scotland League (2020)	New Cumnock	1930	Loch Park	Category:Glenafton Athletic F.C. players
Glenboig	Defunct (1988)	Glenboig	1973	Carrick Park	Category:Glenboig F.C. players
Glenrothes	Moved to East of Scotland League (2019)	Glenrothes	1964	Warout Stadium	Category:Glenrothes F.C. players
**Glentanar**	**North**	**Aberdeen**	**1978**	**Woodside Sports Complex**	Category:Glentanar F.C. players
Gourock	Defunct (1965)	Gourock	1919	Drumshantie Park	Category:Gourock F.C. players
Grangemouth Rovers	Defunct (1979)	Grangemouth	1972	Grangemouth Sports Stadium	Category:Grangemouth Rovers F.C. players
Grangemouth United	Defunct (1966)	Grangemouth	1956	Forthside Park	Category:Grangemouth United F.C. players
**Greenock Juniors**	Moved to West of Scotland League (2020)	Greenock	1956	Ravenscraig Stadium	Category:Greenock Juniors F.C. players
Gretna	Moved to Carlisle & District League (1947)	Gretna	1946	Raydale Park	Category:Gretna F.C. players
Haddington Athletic	Moved to East of Scotland League (2018)	Haddington	1939	Millfield Park	Category:Haddington Athletic F.C. players
Halbeath	Defunct (1993)	Halbeath	1970	Village Park	
**Hall Russell United**	**North**	**Bridge of Don**	**1968**	**Denmore Park**	Category:Hall Russell United F.C. players
Hall Russell's & Company	Defunct (1963)	Aberdeen	1915		Category:Hall Russell's & Company F.C. players
**Harthill Royal**	Moved to West of Scotland League (2021)	Harthill	1992	Gibbshill Park	Category:Harthill Royal F.C. players
Hearts of Beath	Defunct (1941)	Hill of Beath	1886	Keir's Park	Category:Hearts of Beath F.C. players
Hearts of Liddesdale	Moved to Amateur (1927)	Newcastleton	1880	Public Park	Category:Hearts of Liddesdale F.C. players
**Hermes**	**North**	**Aberdeen**	**1968**	**Uniconn Park**	Category:Hermes F.C. players
Hill of Beath Hawthorn	Moved to East of Scotland League (2018)	Hill of Beath	1975	Keir's Park	Category:Hill of Beath Hawthorn F.C. players
Hill Rovers	Moved to Amateur (1955)	Inverness	1935		Category:Hill Rovers F.C. players
**Hurlford United**	Moved to West of Scotland League (2020)	Hurlford	1938	Blair Park	Category:Hurlford United F.C. players
Hydro Dynamo	Defunct (1977)	Dundee	1973	Glenesk Park	Category:Hydro Dynamo F.C. players
Insch	Defunct (1994)	Insch	1987		Category:Insch F.C. players
Inverkeithing United	Defunct (1963)	Inverkeithing	1906	Ballast Bank	Category:Inverkeithing United F.C. players
Inverness City	Defunct (2019)	Inverness	2006	Lister Park	Category:Inverness City F.C. players
Inverurie Loco Works	Moved to Highland League (2001)	Inverurie	1903	Harlaw Park	Category:Inverurie Loco Works F.C. players
**Irvine Meadow XI**	Moved to West of Scotland League (2020)	Irvine	1897	Meadow Park	Category:Irvine Meadow XI F.C. players
**Irvine Victoria**	Moved to West of Scotland League (2020)	Irvine	1904	Victoria Park	Category:Irvine Victoria F.C. players
**Islavale**	**North**	**Keith**	**1949**	**Simpson Park**	Category:Islavale F.C. players
Jeanfield Swifts	Moved to East of Scotland League (2018)	Perth	1928	Riverside Stadium	Category:Jeanfield Swifts F.C. players
Johnshaven Dauntless	In abeyance (1960)	Johnshaven	1909	Wairds Park	Category:Johnshaven Dauntless F.C. players
Johnstone Athletic	Defunct (1941)	Johnstone	1936	Newfield Park	Category:Johnstone Athletic F.C. players
**Johnstone Burgh**	Moved to West of Scotland League (2020)	Johnstone	1956	Keanie Park	Category:Johnstone Burgh F.C. players
**Kello Rovers**	Moved to West of Scotland League (2020)	Kirkconnel	1903	Nithside Park	Category:Kello Rovers F.C. players
Kelty Hearts	Moved to East of Scotland League (2017)	Kelty	1975	New Central Park	Category:Kelty Hearts F.C. players
Kelty Rangers	Defunct (1970)	Kelty	1930	North End Park	Category:Kelty Rangers F.C. players
Kennoway Star Hearts	Moved to East of Scotland League (2020)	Star	2013	Treaton Park	Category:Kennoway Star Hearts F.C. players
**Kilbirnie Ladeside**	Moved to West of Scotland League (2020)	Kilbirnie	1901	Valefield Park	Category:Kilbirnie Ladeside F.C. players
**Kilsyth Rangers**	Moved to West of Scotland League (2020)	Kilsyth	1913	Duncansfield Park	Category:Kilsyth Rangers F.C. players
Kilwinning Eglinton	Defunct (1937)	Kilwinning	1893	Blacklands Park	Category:Kilwinning Eglinton F.C. players
Kilwinning Rangers	Moved to West of Scotland League (2020)	Kilwinning	1899	Kilwinning Sports Club	Category:Kilwinning Rangers F.C. players
Kinnoull	Moved to East of Scotland League (2019)	Perth	1943	Tulloch Park	Category:Kinnoull F.C. players
Kirkcaldy & Dysart	Moved to East of Scotland League (2020)	Kirkcaldy	1969	Denfield Park	Category:Kirkcaldy YM F.C. players
**Kirkintilloch Rob Roy**	Moved to West of Scotland League (2020)	Cumbernauld	1878	Guy's Meadow	Category:Kirkintilloch Rob Roy F.C. players
**Kirriemuir Thistle**	**East**	**Kirriemuir**	**1921**	**Westview Park**	Category:Kirriemuir Thistle F.C. players
**Lanark United**	Moved to West of Scotland League (2020)	Lanark	1920	Moor Park	Category:Lanark United F.C. players
**Largs Thistle**	Moved to West of Scotland League (2020)	Largs	1889	Barrfields Stadium	Category:Largs Thistle F.C. players
**Larkhall Thistle**	Moved to West of Scotland League (2020)	Larkhall	1878	Gasworks Park	Category:Larkhall Thistle F.C. players
**Lesmahagow**	Moved to West of Scotland League (2020)	Lesmahagow	1885	Craighead Park	Category:Lesmahagow F.C. players
**Letham**	**East**	**Perth**	1960	Seven Acres	Category:Letham F.C. players
Leven	Defunct (1990)	Leven	1968	King George V Park	Category:Leven F.C. players
Lewis United	Defunct (2018)	Aberdeen	1942	Aberdeen Sports Village	Category:Lewis United F.C. players
Linlithgow Rose	Moved to East of Scotland League (2018)	Linlithgow	1889	Prestonfield	Category:Linlithgow Rose F.C. players
Linlithgow Rose Community	Moved to Stirling & District Amateur Football Association (2021)	Linlithgow	2019	Xcite Linlithgow	
**Livingston United**	Moved to East of Scotland League (2021)	Livingston	1970	Station Park	Category:Livingston United F.C. players
Loanhead Mayflower	Defunct (1965)	Loanhead	1947	Memorial Ground	Category:Loanhead Mayflower F.C. players
**Lochee Harp**	**East**	**Dundee**	**1904**	**Beechwood Park**	Category:Lochee Harp F.C. players
**Lochee United**	**East**	**Dundee**	**1892**	**Thomson Park**	Category:Lochee United F.C. players
Lochgelly Albert	Moved to East of Scotland League (2020)	Lochgelly	1926	Gardiners Park	Category:Lochgelly Albert F.C. players
Lochore Welfare	Moved to East of Scotland League (2020)	Crosshill	1934	Central Park	Category:Lochore Welfare F.C. players
Lossiemouth United	Defunct (2015)	Lossiemouth	1962	Coulardbank Playing Fields	Category:Lossiemouth United F.C. players
**Longside**	**North**	**Longside**	**1933**	**Davidson Park**	Category:Longside F.C. players
**Lugar Boswell Thistle**	Moved to West of Scotland League (2020)	Lugar	1878	Rosebank Park	Category:Lugar Boswell Thistle F.C. players
Luncarty	Moved to East of Scotland League (2020)	Luncarty	1886	Brownlands Park	Category:Luncarty F.C. players
**Maryhill**	Moved to West of Scotland League (2020)	Maryhill	1884	Lochburn Park	Category:Maryhill F.C. players
Maryhill Hibernians	Defunct (1967)	Maryhill	1923	Kelvinvale Park	Category:Maryhill Harp F.C. players
**Maud**	**North**	**Maud**	**1973**	**Pleasure Park**	Category:Maud F.C. players
**Maybole Juniors**	Moved to West of Scotland League (2020)	Maybole	1946	Ladywell Stadium	Category:Maybole F.C. (1895) players
**Montrose Roselea**	**North**	**Montrose**	**1930**	**Broomfield Park**	Category:Montrose Roselea F.C. players
**Muirkirk Juniors**	Moved to West of Scotland League (2020)	Muirkirk	1937	Ladeside Park	Category:Muirkirk F.C. players
Musselburgh Athletic	Moved to East of Scotland League (2018)	Musselburgh	1934	Olivebank Stadium	Category:Musselburgh Athletic F.C. players
**Nairn St. Ninian**	**North**	**Nairn**	**1968**	**Showfield Park**	Category:Nairn St. Ninian F.C. players
Neilston	Moved to West of Scotland League (2020)	Neilston	1945	Brig O' Lea Stadium	Category:Neilston F.C. players
**New Elgin**	**North**	**Elgin**	**1896**	**Nicol-Togneri Park**	Category:New Elgin F.C. players
New Stevenston United	Defunct (1956)	New Stevenston	1937	Klondyke Park	Category:New Stevenston United F.C. players
Newarthill Hearts	Defunct (1960)	Kilbirnie	1932	Moss Park	Category:Newarthill Hearts F.C. players
Newburgh	Moved to East of Scotland League (2020)	Newburgh	1909	East Shore Park	Category:Newburgh F.C. players
**Newmachar United**	**North**	**Newmachar**	**1987**	**Charles Gordon Park**	Category:Newmachar United F.C. players
**Newmains United**	Moved to West of Scotland League (2020)	Newmains	2006	Victoria Park	Category:Newmains United F.C. players
Newtongrange Star	Moved to East of Scotland League (2018)	Newtongrange	1890	New Victoria Park	Category:Newtongrange Star F.C. players
Oakley United	Moved to East of Scotland League (2018)	Oakley	1964	Blairwood Park	Category:Oakley United F.C. players
Parkhead	Defunct (1963)	Glasgow	1880	Helenslea Park	Category:Parkhead F.C. players
Penicuik Athletic	Moved to East of Scotland League (2018)	Penicuik	1888	Penicuik Park	Category:Penicuik Athletic F.C. players
**Petershill**	Moved to West of Scotland League (2020)	Springburn	1897	Petershill Park	Category:Petershill F.C. players
**Pollok**	Moved to West of Scotland League (2020)	Newlands	1908	Newlandsfield Park	Category:Pollok F.C. players
Port Glasgow Juniors	Moved to West of Scotland League (2020)	Port Glasgow	1948	Port Glasgow Community Stadium	Category:Port Glasgow F.C. players
Preston Athletic	Moved to East of Scotland League (1994)	Prestonpans	1945	Pennypit Park	Category:Preston Athletic F.C. players
**Pumpherston**	Moved to East of Scotland League (2021)	Pumpherston	1990	Recreation Park	Category:Pumpherston F.C. players
Queen's Park Hampden XI	Defunct (1880)	Glasgow	1880	Hampden Park (I)	Category:Queen's Park Hampden XI F.C. players
RAF Lossiemouth	Moved to Moray District Welfare Association (2012)	Lossiemouth	1970	RAF Lossiemouth	Category:RAF Lossiemouth F.C. players
Raith Rovers	Moved to Midland League (1891)	Kirkcaldy	1883		Category:Raith Rovers F.C. players
Raith Rovers Juniors	Defunct (1906)	Kirkcaldy	1905		Category:Raith Rovers Juniors F.C. players
**Renfrew**	Moved to West of Scotland League (2020)	Renfrew	1912	New Western Park	Category:Renfrew F.C. players
Rosslyn	Defunct (1957)	Dysart	1910	Station Park	Category:Rosslyn F.C. players
**Rothie Rovers**	**North**	**Rothienorman**	**1985**		Category:Rothie Rovers F.C. players
Rosyth	Moved to East of Scotland League (2020)	Rosyth	1992	Recreation Park	Category:Rosyth F.C. players
Royal Albert	Moved to West of Scotland League (2020)	Stonehouse	1878	Tileworks Park	Category:Royal Albert F.C. players
Rutherglen Glencairn	Moved to West of Scotland League (2020)	Rutherglen	1896	Celsius Stadium	Category:Rutherglen Glencairn F.C. players
**Saltcoats Victoria**	Moved to West of Scotland League (2020)	Saltcoats	1911	Campbell Park	Category:Saltcoats Victoria F.C. players
Sauchie Juniors	Moved to East of Scotland League (2018)	Sauchie	1960	Beechwood Park	Category:Sauchie Juniors F.C. players
Sauchie Juniors Community	Defunct (2021)	Sauchie	2019	Beechwood Park	
**Scone Thistle**	**East**	**Scone**	**1882**	**Farquharson Park**	Category:Scone Thistle F.C. players
Shawfield	Defunct (1960)	Glasgow	1918	Rosebery Park	Category:Shawfield F.C. players
**Shotts Bon Accord**	Moved to West of Scotland League (2020)	Shotts	1950	Hannah Park	Category:Shotts Bon Accord F.C. players
Shotts United	Defunct (1938)	Shotts	1903	Stanes Park	Category:Shotts United F.C. players
**Spey Valley United**	**North**	**Cromdale**	**2016**	**Cromdale Park**	Category:Spey Valley United F.C. players
St Andrews United	Moved to East of Scotland League (2018)	St Andrews	1920	Barnetts Park	Category:St Andrews United F.C. players
**St. Anthony's**	Moved to West of Scotland League (2020)	Cardonald	1902	McKenna Park	Category:St Anthony's F.C. players
**St. Roch's**	Moved to West of Scotland League (2020)	Provanmill	1921	James McGrory Park	Category:St Roch's F.C. players
Steelend Victoria	Defunct (2014)	Steelend	1995	Woodside Park	Category:Steelend Victoria F.C. players
**Stonehaven**	**North**	**Stonehaven**	**1919**	**Glenury Park**	Category:Stonehaven F.C. players
Stonehouse Violet	Defunct (2012)	Stonehouse	1924	Tilework Park	Category:Stonehouse Violet F.C. players
**Stoneyburn**	Moved to East of Scotland League (2021)	Stoneyburn	1983	Beechwood Park	Category:Stoneyburn F.C. players
**Stoneywood Parkvale**	**North**	**Aberdeen**	**2016**	**Clark Commercial Park**	Category:Stoneywood Parkvale F.C. players
Strathclyde	Defunct (1965)	Glasgow	1894	Springfield Park	Category:Strathclyde F.C. players
Strathspey Thistle	Moved to Highland League (2009)	Grantown-on-Spey	1993	Seafield Park	Category:Strathspey Thistle F.C. players
**Sunnybank**	**North**	**Aberdeen**	**1946**	**Heathryfold Park**	Category:Sunnybank F.C. players
**Syngenta**	Moved to East of Scotland League (2021)	Grangemouth	2019	Ochilview Park	Category:Syngenta F.C. players
**Tayport**	**East**	**Tayport**	**1947**	**The Canniepairt**	Category:Tayport F.C. players
**Thorniewood United**	Moved to West of Scotland League (2020)	Viewpark	1924	Robertson Park	Category:Thorniewood United F.C. players
Thornton Hibs	Moved to East of Scotland League (2020)	Thornton	1935	Memorial Park	Category:Thornton Hibs F.C. players
Tranent (formerly Tranent Juniors)	Moved to East of Scotland League (2018)	Tranent	1911	Foresters Park	Category:Tranent F.C. players
**Troon**	Moved to West of Scotland League (2020)	Troon	1946	Portland Park	Category:Troon F.C. players
Tulliallan Thistle	Defunct (2003)	Kincardine	1962	Burnside Park	Category:Tulliallan Thistle F.C. players
Turriff United	Moved to Highland League (2009)	Turriff	1954	The Haughs	Category:Turriff United F.C. players
Vale of Clyde	Moved to West of Scotland League (2020)	Tollcross	1873	Fullarton Park	Category:Vale of Clyde F.C. players
**Vale of Leven**	Moved to West of Scotland League (2020)	Alexandria	1939	Millburn Park	Category:Vale of Leven F.C. players
Wellesley	Defunct (1940)	Buckhaven	1919	School Park	Category:Wellesley F.C. players
**West Calder United**	Moved to East of Scotland League (2021)	West Calder	1950	Hermand Park	Category:West Calder United F.C. players
Whitburn	Moved to East of Scotland League (2021)	Whitburn	1933	Central Park	Category:Whitburn F.C. players
**Whitehills**	**North**	**Whitehills**	**1999**	**School Park**	Category:Whitehills F.C. players
**Whitletts Victoria**	Moved to West of Scotland League (2020)	Ayr	1944	Dam Park	Category:Whitletts Victoria F.C. players
**Wishaw**	Moved to West of Scotland League (2020)	Wishaw	1885	Beltane Park	Category:Wishaw F.C. players
**Yoker Athletic**	Moved to West of Scotland League (2020)	Clydebank	1886	Holm Park	Category:Yoker Athletic F.C. players
