= Lanarkshire Junior Football League =

The Lanarkshire Junior Football League was a football league competition operated in Lanarkshire under the Scottish Junior Football Association which operated from 1891, being the oldest-running regional competition of its kind until a merger in 1968.

The league was formed in 1891, at which point six of the ten finalists in the 5-year history of the Scottish Junior Cup had been from Lanarkshire (not counting those in the city of Glasgow under its boundaries of the time) indicating a strong presence at Junior level, with teams forming in many towns and villages involved in the thriving coal mining and steelworking industries. However, by 1895 a rival Glasgow Junior Football League was formed, and that quickly became a superior competition due to the abundance of players, higher attendances and lower costs associated with travelling. The proximity of the big city also caused problems for the Lanarkshire league organisers, with the clubs based in their territory consistently seeking to join the GJL, while the short distances involved made it feasible to do so whenever they were considered a useful addition. Some Lanarkshire clubs also switched between their local league and the Scottish Junior Football League, which had no specific territory but also existed in the shadow of the Glasgow-based league until it folded in the 1940s.

Unlike the GJL and the Western Junior Football League (the equivalent based in Ayrshire), the Lanarkshire league was not involved in the Intermediate dispute relating to compensation payments due to clubs joining Scottish Football League teams, although several of its members defected to the rebel group, some never returning; during those clubs' four-year absence from the Scottish Junior Cup, Lanarkshire's Burnbank Athletic reached the final twice. When then dispute was resolved in 1931, a new regional knockout tournament, the West of Scotland Junior Cup, was carried over from the Intermediate setup, and after a few years the Lanarkshire league clubs were invited to take part, although as in the Scottish Cup, teams were involved in the latter stages only occasionally (5 wins in 34 editions), the competition being dominated by the GJL's successor, the Central League. Unlike most of Junior football, the Lanarkshire league went into abeyance for five years during World War II, with clubs playing in the 'Lanark & Lothians Junior League' during the conflict.

In 1968 the Junior football system across Scotland was reorganised, with Lanarkshire's league (which now only had ten member clubs due to defections, and several clubs folding as traditional industries declined and entire communities dispersed) merging into the Central setup. It was the first Scottish Junior league to be established, at the time of its dissolution it was the longest-running.

== Champions ==
Key:

Club also won the Scottish Junior Cup (doubles in **bold**).
Club were also runners-up in the Scottish Junior Cup.

Season	Winner	Runner-up	Other member in Scottish Cup final
1891–92	Newmains Thistle	Haywood Wanderers	
1892–93	Blantyre Victoria	Larkhall Thistle	
1893–94	Blantyre Victoria	Longriggend Wanderers	
1894–95	Mossend Celtic	Longriggend Wanderers	
1895–96	Larkhall Thistle	Longriggend Wanderers	
1896–97	Burnbank Athletic	Dalziel Rovers	
1897–98	**Dalziel Rovers**	Mossend Celtic	
1898–99	Dalziel Rovers	Holytown Thistle	
1899–1900	Holytown Thistle	Cadzow Oak	
1900–01	**Burnbank Athletic**	Cadzow Oak	
1901–02	Burnbank Athletic	Carluke Rovers (Note: Playing as 'Carluke Milton Rovers'.)	
1902–03	Burnbank Athletic	Bellshill Athletic (Note: Playing as 'Bellshill and Clydesdale United'.)	Larkhall Thistle
1903–04	Burnbank Athletic	Dalziel Rovers	
1904–05	Dalziel Rovers	Bellshill Athletic	
1905–06	Blantyre Victoria	Burnbank Athletic	
1906–07	East Benhar Heatherbell	Quarter Huttonbank	
1907–08	Quarter Huttonbank	Newton Villa	Larkhall Thistle
1908–09	Quarter Huttonbank	Mossend Hibernian	
1909–10	Larkhall United	Cleland Rangers	
1910–11	Blantyre Victoria	Larkhall United	Burnbank Athletic
1911–12	Burnbank Athletic	Larkhall United	
1912–13	Larkhall Thistle	Fauldhouse West Rovers	
1913–14	**Larkhall Thistle**	Mossend Hibernian	
1914–15	Larkhall United	Mossend Hibernian	
1915–16	Burnbank Athletic	Blantyre Victoria	
1916–17	Blantyre Celtic (Note: Playing as 'Blantyre United'.)	Mossend Hibernian	
1917–18	Cleland (Note: Playing as 'Cleland Rovers'.)	Newarthill Thistle	
1918–19	Not played		
1919–20	Blantyre Victoria	Blantyre Celtic	
1920–21	Cleland	Blantyre Celtic	
1921–22	Cleland	Blantyre Celtic	
1922–23	Carluke Rovers	Blantyre Victoria	
1923–24	Shotts United	Fauldhouse United	
1924–25	Shotts United	Cadzow St Anne's	
1925–26	Wishaw Juniors	Cadzow St Anne's	
1926–27	Blantyre Victoria	Fauldhouse United	
1927–28	Coalburn United	Law Scotia	Burnbank Athletic
1928–29	Burnbank Athletic	Douglas Water Thistle	
1929–30	Coalburn United	Shotts Battlefield	
1930–31	Shotts Battlefield	Larkhall Thistle	Burnbank Athletic
1931–32	Larkhall Thistle	Forth Wanderers	
1932–33	Douglas Water Thistle	Larkhall Thistle	
1933–34	Royal Albert Athletic	Wishaw Juniors	
1934–35	Wishaw Juniors	Royal Albert Athletic	
1935–36	Royal Albert Athletic	Larkhall Thistle	
1936–37	Royal Albert Athletic	Wishaw Juniors	
1937–38	Holytown United	Newarthill Hearts	
1938–39	Stonehouse Violet	Coltness United	
1939–40	New Stevenston United	Carluke Rovers	
1940–41	Burnbank Athletic	Carluke Rovers	
1941–42	Not played		
1942–43	Not played		
1943–44	Not played		
1944–45	Not played		Burnbank Athletic (Note: LJL club playing in wartime 'Lanark & Lothians Junior League'.)
1945–46	Wishaw Juniors	Larkhall Thistle	
1946–47	Burnbank Athletic	Coltness United	
1947–48	Larkhall Thistle	Mount Ellon United	
1948–49	Newarthill Hearts	Forth Wanderers	
1949–50	New Stevenston United	Cleland	
1950–51	Thorniewood United	Stonehouse Violet	
1951–52	Larkhall Thistle	Shotts Bon Accord	
1952–53	Lesmahagow	Carluke Rovers	
1953–54	Coltness United	Thorniewood United	
1954–55	Douglas Water Thistle	Stonehouse Violet	
1955–56	Thorniewood United	Douglas Water Thistle	
1956–57	Carluke Rovers	Coltness United	
1957–58	**Shotts Bon Accord**	Carluke Rovers	
1958–59	Carluke Rovers	Thorniewood United	
1959–60	Thorniewood United	Lanark United	
1960–61	Shotts Bon Accord	Thorniewood United	
1961–62	Shotts Bon Accord	Thorniewood United	
1962–63	Shotts Bon Accord	Wishaw Juniors	
1963–64	Thorniewood United	Shotts Bon Accord	
1964–65	Shotts Bon Accord	Larkhall Thistle	
1965–66	Forth Wanderers	Carluke Rovers	
1966–67	Shotts Bon Accord	Larkhall Thistle	
1967–68	Shotts Bon Accord	Larkhall Thistle	

== List of winners ==
Club	Winners	Runners-up	First win	Last win
Burnbank Athletic	10	1	1896–97	1946–47
Shotts Bon Accord	7	2	1957–58	1967–68
Larkhall Thistle	6	'8	1895–96	1951–52
Blantyre Victoria	6	2	1892–93	1926–27
Thorniewood United	4	4	1950–51	1963–64
Carluke Rovers	3	6	1922–23	1958–59
Wishaw Juniors	3	3	1925–26	1945–46
Dalziel Rovers	3	2	1897–98	1904–05
Royal Albert Athletic	3	1	1933–34	1936–37
Cleland	3	1	1917–18	1921–22
Larkhall United	2	2	1909–10	1914–15
Douglas Water Thistle	2	2	1932–33	1954–55
Quarter Huttonbank	2	1	1907–08	1908–09
New Stevenston	2	0	1939–40	1949–50
Shotts United	2	0	1923–24	1924–25
Coalburn United	2	0	1927–28	1929–30
Blantyre Celtic	1	3	1916–17	
Coltness United	1	3	1953–54	
Forth Wanderers	1	2	1965–66	
Stonehouse Violet	1	2	1938–39	
Mossend Celtic	1	1	1894–95	
Newarthill Hearts	1	1	1948–49	
Shotts Battlefield	1	1	1978–79	
Holytown Thistle	1	1	1899–1900	
Lesmahagow	1	0	1952–53	
East Benhar Heatherbell	1	0	1906–07	
Newmains Thistle	1	0	1891–92	
Holytown United	1	0	1937–38	
Mossend Hibernian	0	4	N/A	
Longriggend Wanderers	0	3	N/A	
Bellshill Athletic	0	2	N/A	
Fauldhouse United	0	2	N/A	
Cadzow Oak	0	2	N/A	
Cadzow St Anne's	0	2	N/A	
Lanark United	0	1	N/A	
Cleland Rangers	0	1	N/A	
Fauldhouse West Rovers	0	1	N/A	
Haywood Wanderers	0	1	N/A	
Mount Ellon United	0	1	N/A	
Newton Villa	0	1	N/A	
