= East Junior Football League =

Junior football league competition in Scotland

The East Junior Football League, also known as the Edinburgh & District Junior League, the Midlothian Junior League and the Lothians Junior League, was a football league competition operated in Edinburgh, the Lothians and Falkirk under the Scottish Junior Football Association. It had fluctuations in membership and territory but had a continuous operation as the top league in the east of Scotland until a merger in 2002; it existed as the Lothians District for a further four years as a second-tier league before the name was discontinued in 2006.

== History ==
Junior football competitions had been organised in the Edinburgh area since the 1890s, with a Edinburgh & District Junior League formed in 1892 followed by other small groups in each part of the Lothians region surrounding the city; by the 1910s, the Midlothian Junior League emerged as the strongest of these, drawing membership from the many small mining communities which regularly produced skilled players and attracted a loyal local support. The East of Scotland Junior League covering all parts was set up in a 1922 reorganisation, but this was at the same time as the formation of the East of Scotland Football League (EoSFL), an unrelated 'senior' organisation below, and more closely linked to, the professional Scottish Football League. The majority of emerging clubs within Edinburgh and those in the Scottish Borders joined the EoSFL rather than the East Juniors, who were unable to successfully agree on a new format in this lopsided geography, with the predominant Midlothian clubs and those in East Lothian breaking away to form a new Midlothian Junior League in 1928. Those in West Lothian found themselves with little option but to apply for this 'rebel' setup, which retained the Midlothian name until its suspension during World War II. After the war, some teams from the defunct Scottish Junior Football League from further afield joined the setup, and the league was again renamed Edinburgh & District but operated with 'West' and 'Mid & East' divisions whose winners would play off for the championship.

Despite the true footballing strength of the area never being fully recognised due to the enduring split between the Juniors and the EoSFL, the Edinburgh & District Junior League was considered sufficiently strong to form the East Region, one of the six 'regions' across Scotland in a re-organisation of Junior football in 1968, requiring little adjustment to its operations (the West–east divisions remained until 1973). The period following the change was successful for the territory in terms of East member clubs reaching the Scottish Junior Cup final, achieving this 9 times (3 wins) in 15 years, compared with 15 appearances (8 wins) in the previous 42 years. This was followed by another strong spell with 7 finals (3 wins) in the 14 years from 1989.

However, the small-town teams in the region had generally declined with the closure of local heavy industry, and the surviving clubs looked to boost their income by playing more matches against the leading teams in other areas. In 2002 the new East Region Superleague was created in the east of the country in combination with the Fife League and the Tayside League. The East setup was retained as a feeder division to the Superleague as the Lothians District along with the other historic areas until 2006, when they were fully integrated into the East Region; the Lothians section became the South Division below the Super League and a new Premier Division. The pattern of local appearances in the Scottish Cup final continued at a similar rate, with 3 of 8 finalists lifting the trophy over a 12-year period.

=== Later movement of East clubs ===
In 2018, a large group of East Junior clubs (18 from the old Lothians) joined the East of Scotland (EoSFL) association en masse, aspiring to gain entry to the senior Scottish Professional Football League in future years; This would mean the traditional EoSFL teams and East Juniors could finally be playing together, although with so many teams moving at once, there was not immediate parity, as the new members were placed in a multi-conference system with only one promotion place made available to the Lowland League (where the likes of Spartans had established themselves) and the majority facing some years of battling with their old rivals to make it to the next level. Back in the East Juniors, the remaining teams formed the majority of a new Super League South in 2019 along with those from Fife who had chosen not to switch.

== Champions ==
=== 1922–1968 era ===
Key:

Club also won the Scottish Junior Cup (doubles in **bold**).
Club were also runners-up in the Scottish Junior Cup.

Season	Winner	Runner-up	Other member in Scottish Cup final
1922–23	Newtongrange Star (Note: Separate West Section played, won by Livingston United.) (Note: Separate South Section played, won by Gala Hailes Villa.)	Musselburgh Bruntonians	Arniston Rangers
1923–24	Newtongrange Star (Note: Separate West Section played, won by Linlithgow Rose.) (Note: Separate South Section played, won by Vale of Leithen.)	Bonnyrigg Rose Athletic	
1924–25	Newtongrange Star (Note: Separate South Section played, won by Duns.)	Bonnyrigg Rose Athletic	
1925–26	Newtongrange Star (Note: Separate West Sectionplayed, won by Vale of Grange.)	Portobello Thistle	
1926–27	Newtongrange Star (Note: Separate West Lothian Junior Lesgue played.)	Wallyford Bluebell	
1927–28	Dunbar United (Note: Winners of playoff between clubs who finished top of 'A' Division and 'B' Division.)	Dalkeith Thistle (Note: Losers of playoff between clubs who finished top of 'A' Division and 'B' Division.)	
1928–29	Tranent Juniors (Note: Winners of playoff between clubs who finished top of 'West' Division and 'East' Division.)	Stoneyburn Juniors (Note: Losers of playoff between clubs who finished top of 'West' Division and 'East' Division.)	
1929–30	**Newtongrange Star**	Tranent Juniors	
1930–31	Tranent Juniors	Rosewell Rosedale	
1931–32	Dalkeith Thistle	Tranent Juniors	
1932–33	Newtongrange Star (Note: Title was revoked then reinstated after protest and appeal regarding ineligible player.)	Musselburgh Bruntonians	Tranent Juniors
1933–34	Blackburn Athletic	Bo'ness Cadora	
1934–35	Stoneyburn Juniors	Bo'ness Cadora	Tranent Juniors
1935–36	Bo'ness Cadora	Arniston Rangers	
1936–37	Tranent Juniors	Musselburgh Athletic	
1937–38	Bonnyrigg Rose Athletic	Winchburgh Juniors	
1938–39	Stoneyburn Juniors	Whitburn Juniors	
1939–40	Armadale Thistle	Tranent Juniors	
1940–41	Armadale Thistle	Winchburgh Juniors	
1941–42	Not played		
1942–43	Not played		
1943–44	Not played		
1944–45	Not played		
1945–46	**Fauldhouse United**	Bo'ness United	
1946–47	Bo'ness United	Whitburn Juniors	
1947–48	**Bo'ness United**	Armadale Thistle	
1948–49	Bo'ness United	Armadale Thistle	
1949–50	Armadale Thistle (Note: Winners of playoff between clubs who finished top of 'West' Division and 'Mid-East' Division.)	Arniston Rangers (Note: Losers of playoff between clubs who finished top of 'West' Division and 'Mid-East' Division.)	
1950–51	Newtongrange Star	Camelon Juniors	
1951–52	Newtongrange Star	Broxburn Athletic	Camelon Juniors
1952–53	Armadale Thistle	Newtongrange Star	
1953–54	Arniston Rangers	Bo'ness United	
1954–55	Newtongrange Star (Note: 'West' Division winners Bo'ness United refused to play the championship playoff in Midlothian as they had done so and lost the previous season - the league awarded the title to 'Mid-East' Division winners Newtongrange Star without a match being played.)	Bo'ness United	
1955–56	Dalkeith Thistle	Broxburn Athletic	
1956–57	Haddington Athletic	Broxburn Athletic	
1957–58	Bo'ness United	Ormiston Primrose	Pumpherston
1958–59	Newtongrange Star	Bo'ness United	
1959–60	Loanhead Mayflower	West Calder United	
1960–61	Dalkeith Thistle	Armadale Thistle	Dunbar United
1961–62	Dunbar United	Whitburn Juniors	
1962–63	Sauchie Juniors	Newtongrange Star	
1963–64	Bonnyrigg Rose Athletic	Whitburn Juniors	
1964–65	**Linlithgow Rose**	Bonnyrigg Rose Athletic	
1965–66	Linlithgow Rose	Bonnyrigg Rose Athletic	Whitburn
1966–67	Linlithgow Rose	Bonnyrigg Rose Athletic	
1967–68	Linlithgow Rose	Newtongrange Star	

=== 1968–2002 era ===
Club also won the Scottish Junior Cup (doubles in **bold**).
Club were also runners-up in the Scottish Junior Cup.

Season	Winner	Runner-up (Note: Runners-up incomplete.)	Other member in Scottish Cup final
1968–69	Bo'ness United (Note: Winners of playoff between clubs who finished top of 'West' Division and 'Mid-East' Division.)	Newtongrange Star (Note: Losers of playoff between clubs who finished top of 'West' Division and 'Mid-East' Division.)	
1969–70	Arniston Rangers	Pumpherston	Penicuik Athletic
1970–71	Musselburgh Athletic	Broxburn Athletic	Newtongrange Star
1971–72	Arniston Rangers	Whitburn Juniors	Bonnyrigg Rose Athletic
1972–73	Broxburn Athletic	Musselburgh Athletic	
1973–74	Broxburn Athletic	Musselburgh Athletic	Linlithgow Rose
1974–75	Linlithgow Rose	Dalkeith Thistle	
1975–76	Bonnyrigg Rose Athletic	Arniston Rangers	Bo'ness United
1976–77	Bonnyrigg Rose Athletic	Linlithgow Rose	
1977–78	Linlithgow Rose	Bonnyrigg Rose Athletic	
1978–79	Penicuik Athletic	Camelon Juniors	Bo'ness United
1979–80	Camelon Juniors	Linlithgow Rose	
1980–81	Penicuik Athletic	Arniston Rangers	
1981–82	Linlithgow Rose	Bonnyrigg Rose Athletic	
1982–83	Fauldhouse United	Tranent Juniors	Bo'ness United
1983–84	Linlithgow Rose	Broxburn Athletic	Bo'ness United
1984–85	Bonnyrigg Rose Athletic	Whitburn Juniors	
1985–86	Whitburn Juniors	Linlithgow Rose	
1986–87	Whitburn Juniors	Newtongrange Star	
1987–88	Linlithgow Rose	Whitburn Juniors	
1988–89	Whitburn Juniors	Linlithgow Rose	Ormiston Primrose
1989–90	Whitburn Juniors	Bo'ness United	
1990–91	Newtongrange Star	Fauldhouse United	
1991–92	Newtongrange Star	Bo'ness United	
1992–93	Fauldhouse United	Whitburn Juniors	
1993–94	Camelon Juniors	Newtongrange Star	
1994–95	**Camelon Juniors**	Whitburn Juniors	
1995–96	Whitburn Juniors	Arniston Rangers	Camelon Juniors
1996–97	Linlithgow Rose	Bonnyrigg Rose Athletic	
1997–98	Whitburn Juniors	Linlithgow Rose	
1998–99	Linlithgow Rose	Whitburn Juniors	
1999–2000	Linlithgow Rose	Newtongrange Star	Whitburn Juniors
2000–01	Whitburn Juniors	Linlithgow Rose	
2001–02	**Linlithgow Rose**	Whitburn Juniors	

== List of winners ==
Club	1922–1968 era				1968–2002 era				Overall	
Club	Win	R-up	First win	Last win	Win	R-up	First win	Last win	Win	R-up
Newtongrange Star	11	3	1922–23	1958–59	2	4	1990–91	1991–92	13	7
Linlithgow Rose	4	0	1964–65	1967–68	9	5	1974–75	2001–02	13	6
Whitburn Juniors	0	4	N/A		7	7	1985–86	2000–01	7	11
Bonnyrigg Rose Athletic	2	5	1937–38	1963–64	3	3	1975–76	1984–85	5	8
Bo'ness United	4	4	1948–49	1957–58	1	2	1968–69		5	6
Armadale Thistle	4	2	1939–40	1952–53	0	0	N/A		4	2
Arniston Rangers	1	2	1953–54		2	3	1969–70	1971–72	3	5
Tranent Juniors	3	3	1928–29	1936–37	0	1	N/A		3	4
Camelon Juniors	0	1	N/A		3	1	1979–80	1994–95	3	2
Dalkeith Thistle	3	1	1931–32	1960–61	0	1	N/A		3	2
Fauldhouse United	1	0	1945–46		2	1	1982–83	1992–93	3	1
Broxburn Athletic	0	3	N/A		2	2	1972–73	1973–74	2	5
Stoneyburn Juniors	2	1	1934–35	1938–39	0	0	N/A		2	1
Penicuik Athletic	0	0	N/A		2	0	1978–79	1980–81	2	0
Dunbar United	2	0	1927–28	1961–62	0	0	N/A		2	0
Musselburgh Athletic	0	3	N/A		1	2	1970–71		1	5
Bo'ness Cadora	1	2	1935–36		0	0	N/A		1	2
Blackburn Athletic	1	0	1933–34		0	0	N/A		1	0
Haddington Athletic	1	0	1956–57		0	0	N/A		1	0
Loanhead Mayflower	1	0	1959–60		0	0	N/A		1	0
Sauchie Juniors	1	0	1962–63		0	0	N/A		1	0
Winchburgh Juniors	0	2	N/A		0	0	N/A		0	2
West Calder United	0	1	N/A		0	0	N/A		0	1
Pumpherston	0	0	N/A		0	1	N/A		0	1
Ormiston Primrose	0	1	N/A		0	0	N/A		0	1
Portobello Thistle	0	1	N/A		0	0	N/A		0	1
Rosewell Rosedale	0	1	N/A		0	0	N/A		0	1
Wallyford Bluebell	0	1	N/A		0	0	N/A		0	1
