= John Millsopp =

Scottish footballer (1930–1952)

Personal information
- Date of birth: 17 July 1930
- Place of birth: Cambuslang, Scotland
- Date of death: 17 September 1952 (aged 22)
- Place of death: Glasgow, Scotland
- Position: Wing half

Youth career
- Blantyre Celtic
- 1947–1950: Celtic

Senior career*
Years	Team	Apps	(Gls)
1950–1952	Celtic	19	(1)
- * Club domestic league appearances and goals

John 'Jackie' Millsopp (17 July 1930 – 17 September 1952) was a Scottish footballer who played for Celtic.

== Career and death ==
Having joined as a youth player from Junior club Blantyre Celtic three years earlier, Millsopp made his debut for Celtic in a Glasgow Cup tie against Queens Park in September 1950.

Capable of playing in several positions, by 1952 he was establishing himself in the Celtic side when he suffered a burst appendix; he died in hospital from complications shortly afterwards at the age of 22.

Players from Celtic and Old Firm rivals Rangers were among a large crowd of mourners who attended the funeral in Millsopp's home town of Cambuslang, which took place on the morning of a match between the teams on 20 September 1952.
