= Geordie Campbell =

Scottish-Canadian soccer player

Personal information
- Full name: George Campbell
- Date of birth: 13 August 1884
- Place of birth: Glasgow, Scotland
- Date of death: 21 February 1952 (aged 67)
- Place of death: Toronto, Canada
- Position: Defender

Senior career*
| Years | Team | Apps | (Gls) |
- Renfrew Victoria
| 1904–1911 | Toronto Thistles | | |
| 1918–1928 | Toronto Scottish | | |

International career
| 1925 | Canada | 1 | (0) |
- * Club domestic league appearances and goals

George Campbell (13 August 1884 – 21 February 1952) was a Scottish-Canadian soccer player.

== Career ==
The nephew of Scottish international John Campbell (capped once in 1880), Campbell began playing with Renfrew Victoria in the Scottish junior leagues. He later emigrated to Canada where in 1904 he played with Toronto Thistles. Throughout his tenure with Toronto Thistles he won the Ontario Cup in 1905, 1906, 1907, and 1909. In 1918, he signed with Toronto Scottish and played in the Inter-City League and later in the National Soccer League. His achievements with Toronto Scottish included the Challenge Trophy in 1921, and further Ontario Cups in 1918, 1921, and 1922.

He was inducted as a player into The Soccer Hall of Fame (Canada) in 2000. On 24 May 2012 he was selected as the Soccer Hall of Fame's Best XI team in 50 Years from 1912 to 1962.

== International career ==
Campbell made his debut for the Canada men's national soccer team on 27 June 1925 against the United States in a friendly match.
