= FWFC =

FWFC can refer to one of the following Scottish association football clubs:

- Fort William F.C.
- Forth Wanderers F.C.
