= Jock Gibson (footballer) =

American soccer player

Personal information
- Full name: John Rutherford Gibson
- Date of birth: 23 March 1898
- Place of birth: Philadelphia, Pennsylvania, United States
- Date of death: July 1974 (aged 76)
- Place of death: Luton, England
- Height: 5 ft 9 in (1.75 m)
- Position: Full-back

Senior career*
Years	Team	Apps	(Gls)
1918–1919	Netherburn		
1919–1920	Blantyre Celtic		
1920–1922	Sunderland	4	(0)
1922–1929	Hull City	21	(0)
1929–1933	Sheffield United	74	(0)
1933–1934	Luton Town	3	(0)
1934–193?	Vauxhall Motors (Luton)		
- * Club domestic league appearances and goals

John Rutherford Gibson (23 March 1898 – July 1974) was an American professional soccer player who played as a full-back for Sunderland.
