= Joe Murray (footballer) =

Scottish footballer (1914–1990)

Personal information
- Full name: Joseph Murray
- Date of birth: 1914
- Place of birth: Uddingston, Scotland
- Date of death: 31 October 1990 (age 76)
- Place of death: Uddingston, Scotland
- Height: 5 ft 8 in (1.73 m)
- Position: Left half

Senior career*
Years	Team	Apps	(Gls)
- Overton Athletic
1933–1936	Hamilton Academical	46	(1)
1936	Ayr United	0	(0)
1936–1938	Brentford	1	(0)
1938–1939	Partick Thistle	1	(0)
1939–1940	Stenhousemuir	4	(0)
1940–1941	Burnbank Athletic		
1943–1946	Blantyre Celtic		
1946–1947	Thorniewood United		
- * Club domestic league appearances and goals

Joseph Murray (1914 – 31 October 1990), sometimes known as Joker Murray, was a Scottish professional footballer who played as a left half in the Scottish League for Hamilton Academical and Partick Thistle.

== Career statistics ==
Appearances and goals by club, season and competition
Club	Season	League			National Cup		Other		Total	
Club	Season	Division	Apps	Goals	Apps	Goals	Apps	Goals	Apps	Goals
Hamilton Academical	1933–34	Scottish First Division	23	0	2	0	2 (Note: Appearances in Lanarkshire Cup)	0	27	0
Hamilton Academical	1934–35	Scottish First Division	12	0	7	0	0	0	19	0
Hamilton Academical	1935–36	Scottish First Division	11	1	1	0	1	0	13	1
Hamilton Academical	Total		46	1	10	0	3	0	59	1
Brentford	1936–37	First Division	1	0	0	0	—		1	0
Partick Thistle	1938–39	Scottish First Division	1	0	0	0	—		1	0
Career total			48	1	10	0	3	0	61	1

== Honours ==
Mid-Annandale

- Southern Counties Charity Cup: 1932–33

Hamilton Academical 'A'

- Scottish 2nd XI Cup: 1933–34

Ayr United

- Ayrshire Cup: 1935–36
