= 1999–2000 Scottish Junior Cup =

Tournament details
- Country: Scotland
- Teams: 163

Final positions
- Champions: Whitburn
- Runners-up: Johnstone Burgh

Tournament statistics
- Matches played: 162 (not including replays)

The 1999–2000 Scottish Junior Cup was a competition in Scottish Junior football. It was won by Whitburn; they defeated Johnstone Burgh 4–3 on penalties after drawing 2–2 in the final.

== First round ==
These ties were scheduled to take place on Saturday 9 October 1999.

Home team	Score	Away team

== Second round ==
These ties were scheduled to take place on Saturday 6 November 1999.

Home team	Score	Away team

== Third round ==
These ties were scheduled to take place on Saturday, 4 December 1999

Home team	Score	Away team

== Fourth round ==
These ties were scheduled to take place on Saturday, 15 January 2000.

Home team	Score	Away team

== Fifth round ==
These ties were scheduled to take place on Saturday, 12 February 2000.

Home team	Score	Away team
Benburb	3 – 0	Larkhall Thistle
Cumnock Juniors	3 – 0	Kilbirnie Ladeside
Johnstone Burgh	2 – 1	Glenafton Athletic
Lanark United	2 – 0	Thornton Hibs
Maybole Juniors	3 – 0	Arbroath Sporting Club
Neilston	2 – 3	Whitburn
Newtongrange Star	2 – 0	Sunnybank
Shotts Bon Accord	2 – 2	Carnoustie Panmure
replay	2 – 1	

== Quarter finals ==
These ties were played on Saturday 11 March 2000.

Home team	Score	Away team
Benburb	2 – 1	Newtongrange Star
Johnstone Burgh	2 – 1	Cumnock Juniors
Lanark United	0 – 2	Shotts Bon Accord
Whitburn	3 – 1	Arbroath Sporting Club

== Semi-finals ==
These ties were played on 28 April 2000 & 5 May 2000, respectively.

Home team	Score	Away team	Venue
Benburb	1 – 1	Whitburn	
Johnstone Burgh	2 – 2	Shotts Bon Accord	

== Final ==
The final took place on Sunday 28 May 2000.

Home team	Score	Away team	Venue
Whitburn	2 – 2	Johnstone Burgh	Firhill Stadium, Partick Thistle
