= Dalziel Rovers F.C. =

Former association football club in Scotland

Dalziel Rovers
- Full name: Dalziel Rovers Football Club
- Founded: 1887
- Dissolved: 1911
- Ground: Meadow Park
Home colours

Dalziel Rovers F.C. was a Scottish Junior Football Association club from Motherwell, Lanarkshire, Scotland, which won the Scottish Junior Cup in 1898.

== History ==
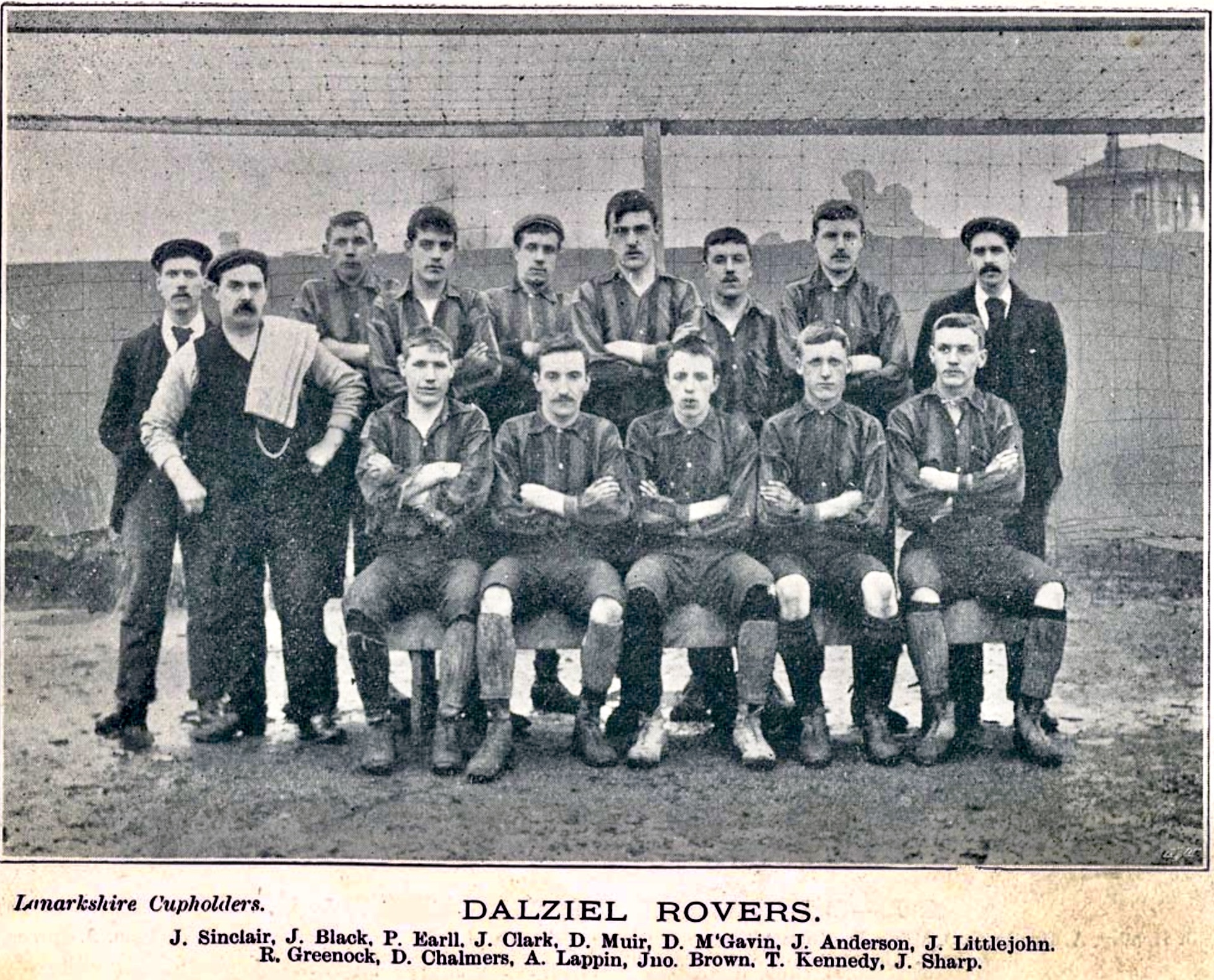
The 1896–97 Dalziel Rovers side which went on to win the Lanarkshire Junior Cup three seasons in a row

The earliest record of the club is from the 1887–88 season.

The club had an inconspicuous first few years, and even in 1891 merged with three other clubs under the Rovers name. In the 1897–98 season, the Rovers did not suffer a single defeat, the season culminating with the Rovers beating Parkhead 2–1 in the Junior Cup final, in front of 7,000 spectators at Meadowside. The club was favoured to retain the trophy, but, in "one of the greatest surprises of the football season", lost to the Westmarch XI at Helenslee Park, conceding the only goal of the game in the 84th minute, having dominated the game.

The triumph was in a run of three successive wins in the Lanarkshire Junior Cup, from 1896–97 to 1898–99, a competition the club won for the last time in 1906–07. The club also took the Lanarkshire Junior Football League in 1897–98 and 1898–99.

The club's success however proved its downfall, with many players leaving for senior football after the 1898–99 season, and a ground move also took attention away from replenishing the squad. After a poor 1910–11 season, in which the club finished bottom of the Lanarkshire Junior League, the club disbanded.

== Colours ==
The earliest record of the club's colours is of black and gold shirts. By 1896 the colours were black and red, although the old shirts seem to have been retained as a change kit.

== Ground ==
The club originally played at Airbles Street, moving to Ladywell Park on Orchard Road in November 1890. Before the 1897–98 season the club moved to a new ground, called Factory Park, back on Airbles Street, and in September 1899 moved once more, to Meadow Park.

== Notable players ==
- * Notable players ( 5 )
- Walter Cowan, the club's captain in the early 1890s.
