= Westmarch XI F.C. =

Former association football club in Scotland

Westmarch XI
- Full name: Westmarch XI Football Club
- Founded: 1886
- Dissolved: 1903
- Ground: Underwood Park
Home colours

The Westmarch XI was an association football club from Paisley, Renfrewshire, which was once runner-up in the Scottish Junior Cup.

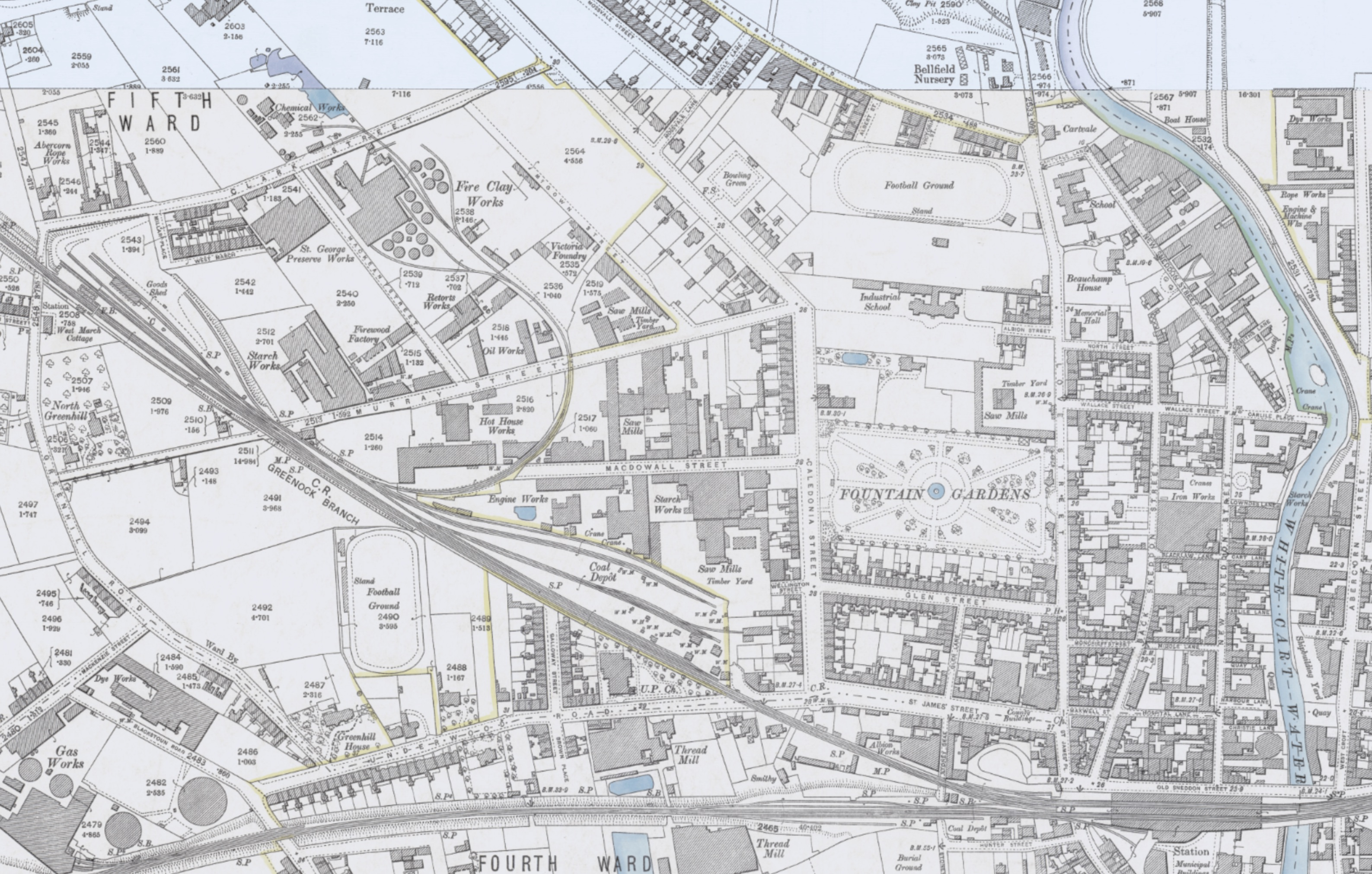
Extract from the Ordnance Survey map Renfrewshire XII.2, published 1897, of Paisley, showing the locations of Underwood Park (bottom left) and Love Street (top right). Caledonia Park was probably the field numbered 2540 to the north of Underwood Park.

== History ==
The club was formed in 1886 as a Junior side affiliated with St Mirren; in common with a number of other such clubs, such as the Queen's Park Hampden XI or the Third Lanark Cathkin XI, rather than being named a reserve or Junior side, the entity took its name from the parent club's ground. The club retained the name after St Mirren was forced to move from Westmarch in 1894, and for two years the Westmarch XI and St Mirren played at different grounds.

However, at the start of the 1896–97 season, St Mirren formed another junior side - simply called St Mirren Juniors - to fill the gap at Love Street when the senior side was playing away. Although the Westmarch XI continued for the season as affiliated with St Mirren, St Mirren Juniors and Westmarch XI even having fixtures with each other, from the 1897–98 season the Westmarch XI switched affiliation to the now-nearer Abercorn F.C., moving to the latter's Underwood Park. This was a help to Abercorn, as the Westmarch admission fees could offset Abercorn's debts, and the club even made a bid to join the Glasgow Junior League, which was declined as the League did not (yet) want to look outside the city.

The club signed off its affiliation with St Mirren by winning the Renfrewshire Junior Cup for the first time, beating Greenock Volunteers 2–0 at Cappielow Park, thanks to an own goal and a Keith goal from a corner; and the club proposed a new league (along with St Mirren Juniors) for Renfrewshire and Dunbartonshire clubs in 1897–98. The league did not take off in that form until 1898–99, and after three middling seasons, the league collapsed in 1901–02, the XI losing a play-off match against Overton for the truncated title.

Westmarch soon outpaced St Mirren Juniors, including beating their rivals 6–0 in the 1897–98 Scottish Junior Cup, and in 1898–99 reached the Junior Cup Final, a backs-to-the-wall late 1–0 win over holders Dalziel Rovers in the semi-final at Helenslee Park being considered a major shock. The XI however lost 4–1 to Parkhead in the final, at Meadowside, albeit the result did not represent the pattern of play, Parkhead scoring two late breakaway goals as the XI dominated the second half.

The club also had success at county level in Cup competitions. In 1900–01, the Paisley Charity Cup was played by Junior clubs for the only time, and Westmarch took the trophy. It also won the Renfrewshire Junior Cup for the second and last time in 1898–99, again at Cappielow, with three first-half goals against Port Glasgow Athletic Juniors.

The club remained strong until the 1902–03 season, joining the Glasgow & District Junior League, and being ranked 4th (out of 10) in the uncompleted table; however the club dissolved in August 1903, seemingly unexpectedly as the club's secretary had just been named as a vice-president of the League. The name was revived briefly in 1909 by Paisley White Star for Scottish Junior Cup ties.

== Colours ==
The club is known to have worn white shirts in 1898–99, which were also Abercorn's colours at the time, so the club may have worn the same colours as its parent club. It would therefore have worn black and white stripes before 1897 and white afterwards.

== Ground ==
As the name suggested, the club played originally at Westmarch. When St Mirren was forced to move to Love Street in 1894, the Westmarch XI did not follow, but instead moved to Caledonia Park, on Mackean Street, the former home of Paisley Athletic, and much closer to Abercorn than to St Mirren. In 1897 the club confirmed its shift of allegiance by moving to Underwood Park.

== Notable players ==
A number of players were called up from the club's ranks to play for the parent club, including:

- St Mirren: James Dunlop
- Abercorn: John Hunter, Robert Dalrymple, George Black.

One Westmarch player won a Junior international cap while with the club - defender William Herd, who appeared against Ireland in 1899.
