= Renfrew Victoria F.C. =

Former association football club in Scotland

Renfrew Victoria
- Full name: Renfrew Victoria Football Club
- Nicknames: the Vic, the Royalists
- Founded: 1890
- Dissolved: 1910
- Ground: Western Park
Home colours

Renfrew Victoria F.C. was a Scottish Junior Football Association club from Renfrew, Scotland, which reached the final of the Scottish Junior Cup in 1894 and 1905.

== History ==
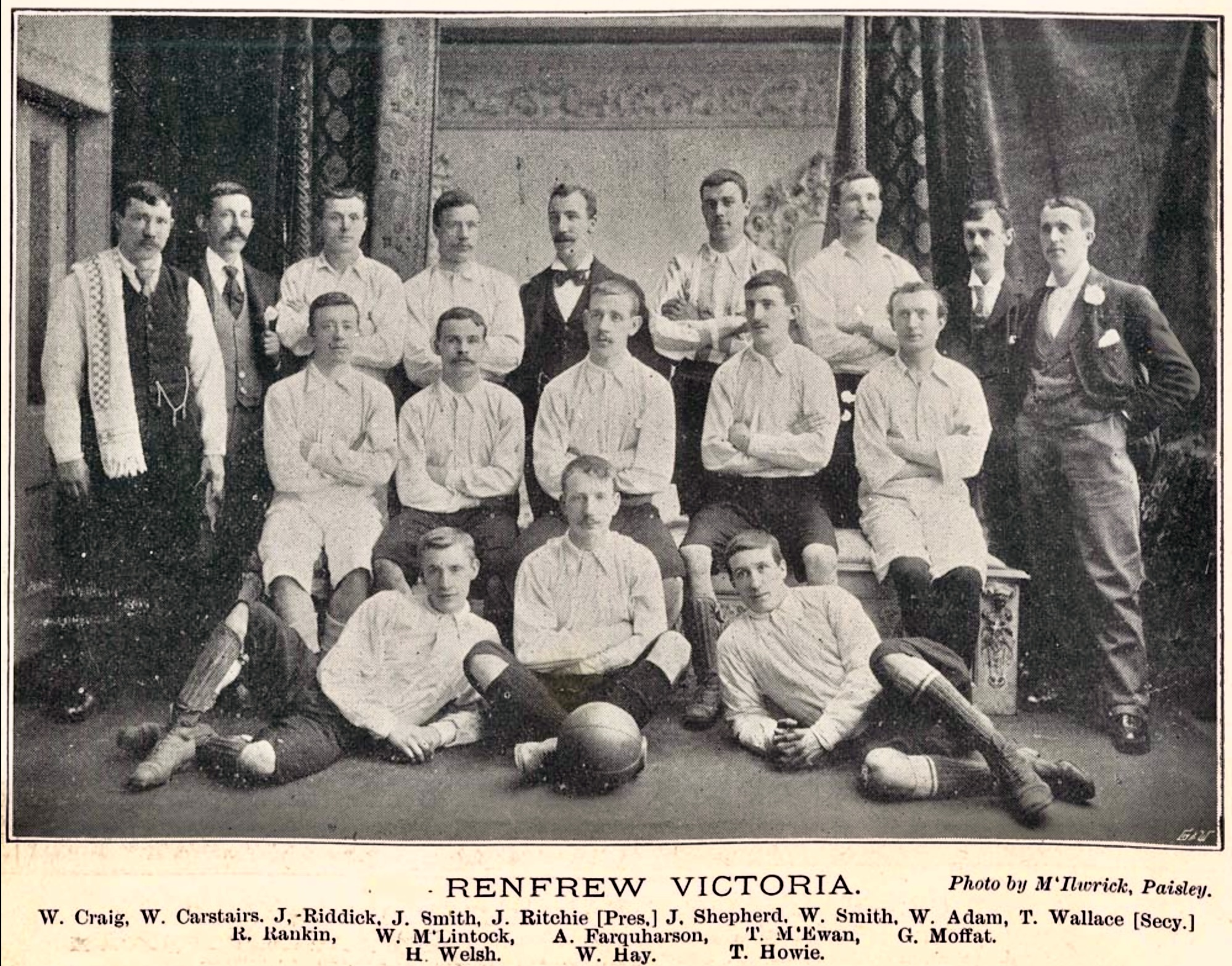
The Renfrew Victoria Football Club from the Scottish Junior Portfolio, published 1897.

The first reference to the club is of its playing in the Renfrewshire Junior Cup in the 1890–91 season. The Vic entered the Scottish Junior Cup for the first time in 1893–94, Renfrew surprised many by reaching the final, played at Abercorn's Underwood Park, but the Vic did not show up well on the day, and lost 3–1 to Ashfield. The decisions of referee McPhee so angered the Vic fans that at one point they rushed the pitch and knocked him down, and in the ensuing melée many of the players joined in; the Vic protested against the result, but the protest was dismissed, and the Scottish JFA censured the Renfrew side for failing to protect the referee. The club also reached the final of the Renfrewshire Junior Cup the same season, but went down to the Greenock Volunteers.

The club did finally win the Renfrewshire Junior Cup in 1904, with an easy 4–0 win over Levern Victoria at Love Street, by which time it had joined the Glasgow Junior League, becoming (in 1902) the first club outside the city to play in the competition. It generally struggled in the competition, finishing bottom in 1908–09, but it had had some success in local competitions, winning two competitions in Paisley in 1901 and the South Western Cup twice.

While a member of the Glasgow League, the Vic reached the Junior Cup final for a second and final time, in 1905, again facing Ashfield, this time at Meadowside. In front of a crowd of 12,000, the Vic went down 2–1, a late breakaway goal clinching the cup for Ashfield.

The club moved to the Scottish Junior League for 1909–10, finishing 11th out of 14 clubs, with 21 points. Unfortunately, the management of the club "got into bad hands and dry rot set in", and the club dissolved in August 1910. Despite various efforts to resuscitate the club, and occasional confusion between the Victoria and the new Renfrew F.C., the club was never revived.

== Colours ==
The club wore white shirts and black shorts.

== Ground ==
The club originally played on the Renfrew Public Park. This was unsatisfactory and there were repeated pleas to move to a more suitable ground, such as Glebe Park or Hairst Street. The club finally secured a new ground at Loanhead Park in September 1897, and in 1899 made its final move, to Western Park, next to the railway terminus.

== Honours ==
- Scottish Junior Cup
  - Runner-up: 1893–94, 1904–05
- Renfrewshire Junior Cup
  - Winner: 1903–04
  - Runner-up: 1893–94
- South Western Cup
  - Winner: 1904–05, 1905–06
- Paisley & District Junior Cup
  - Winner: 1900–01
- Paisley Junior Charity Cup
  - Winner: 1900–01

== Notable players ==
- Notable players ( 8 )
- Jimmy/Jamie Gordon, right half, who played international football at junior level before joining Rangers during the 1906–07 season.
- Andrew Lees, centre-back, who joined Motherwell in 1917.
- Donald Cameron, goalkeeper, who played every Victoria game in the 1908–09 and 1909–10 seasons, before joining Leicester Fosse.
