= Walter Cowan (footballer) =

Scottish footballer

Personal information
- Full name: Walter Gowans Cowan
- Date of birth: 1874
- Place of birth: Dalziel, Scotland
- Date of death: 1960 (aged 85–86)
- Place of death: Springburn, Scotland
- Positions: Inside forward; wing half

Senior career*
Years	Team	Apps	(Gls)
1893–1895	Motherwell	29	(19)
1895–1897	Sunderland	17	(7)
1897–1902	Motherwell	87	(14)
- * Club domestic league appearances and goals

Walter Gowans Cowan (1874 – 1960) was a Scottish professional footballer who played as an inside forward or wing half for Motherwell and Sunderland.
