= Stonehouse Violet F.C. =

Former association football club in Scotland

Stonehouse Violet
- Full name: Stonehouse Violet Football Club
- Nickname(s): Violet
- Founded: 1924
- Dissolved: 2012
- Ground: Tilework Park; Union Street; Stonehouse

Stonehouse Violet Football Club was a Scottish football club, based in Stonehouse, South Lanarkshire (situated between Larkhall and Strathaven). The last incarnation of the club formed in 1966 as Stonehouse Thistle, changing their name to Violet in 1969. A previous Stonehouse Violet club had played at Loch Park in the town from 1924 until 1961. Members of the Scottish Junior Football Association, they competed in the Lanarkshire League, the Central Regional League and latterly in the SJFA West Region. The club were based at Tilework Park and wore blue, orange and white strips (uniforms). Violet were runners-up in the 1977–78 Scottish Junior Cup.

They were forced to withdraw from league competition in December 2008 due to financial difficulties, but retained non-playing membership of the SJFA and rejoined the Central Second Division for the start of season 2010–11. The club, however, folded again on 11 January 2012, citing lack of local support.

== Honours ==
Scottish Junior Cup: Runners-up: 1977–78

Central League Second Division: Winners: 1982–83

- Lanarkshire League winners: 1938–39
- Lanarkshire Hozier Cup: 1937–38, 1938–39

== Notable player links ==
- Tom Forsyth - Rangers, Motherwell & Scottish International
- Brian Martin - St. Mirren, Motherwell & Scottish International
