= Denny Hibernian F.C. =

Defunct association football club from Scotland

- Full name: Denny Hibernian Football Club
- Nicknames: Hibs; Denny Hibs
- Founded: 1906
- Dissolved: 1933
- Ground: School Loan
Home colours

Denny Hibernian F.C. was a Scottish Junior football club from Denny, Falkirk, active before the Second World War, which won the Scottish Junior Cup on one occasion.

== History ==
Denny Hibs were founded in May 1906, at the instigation of James McBryde, a former Stenhousemuir centre-half. The club was drawn to face Dunipace, the Scottish Junior Cup holders, for its first competitive match, in the first round of the 1906–07 Junior Cup, and were one minute away from knocking the holders out; the club eventually succumbed in a replay. Off the back of that result, the Hibs applied to join the Stirlingshire Junior League, which had recently lost two members, but although the club was accepted as a member of the Stirlingshire association, it was turned down on the casting vote of the League chairman. The club instead joined the Clackmannanshire Junior League for 1907–08, and the Hibs won the title, although it did not return to the league for 1908–09.

The Hibs joined the Scottish Junior Football League in 1927–28, in the East division, and although it finished bottom in its first season, it improved to the extent that it won the division in 1930–31 (although it lost the overall title play-off to Dumbarton Harp United, in part due to Malcolm Comrie missing the second half through injury), and the Victory Cup in 1931–32. The club had a tantalizing season in 1928–29, reaching five cup finals, but losing them all.

The club reached three Scottish Junior Cup finals, winning once, in 1930–31. The triumph was suffused with such controversy that the club did not receive the trophy until the week before the 1931–32 final. The 1931 final, at Tynecastle Park, was against Burnbank Athletic, and inside-right McDonough scored the only goal for Denny after 25 minutes. However, on the final whistle, Burnbank put in a protest, on the basis that Denny goalkeeper Joe Toner had played in a pre-season tournament without the SJFA's authorization, and the trophy was withheld; the SJFA upheld the protest by a 5–4 majority and ordered a replay, to which Denny refused to turn up, pending a claim for an interdict in the court in Glasgow. The court refused the interdict, so the replay was rescheduled, but this time the Swifts refused to turn up, so the SJFA finally presented the trophy to Denny nearly a year late.

The legal rows continued to rumble on, and in May 1932 the SJFA suspended the Hibs for non-payment of a fine, which nearly scuppered the club's appearance in the final of the Stirlingshire Junior Cup; the club paid the fine, and beat Camelon Juniors in the final at Brockville Park.

At the height of its powers, however, the club folded. Before the 1933–34 season, the club's ground was requisitioned for a new school, and, unable instantly to secure a new ground, the club committee decided to go into abeyance for the year; however the club was never resurrected. The name was continued by a Juvenile side until 1935.

== Colours ==
The club wore green jerseys and white shorts.

== Ground ==
The club's ground was known as School Loan Park. Its highest recorded attendance was 2,000 for a Junior Cup fourth round tie with Forthill Athletic on 9 January 1932.

== Notable players ==
- Notable players ( 13 )

The club's most famous player was Jimmy McMullan, one of Scotland's Wembley Wizards of 1928, whose first season of competitive football in 1911–12 was with Denny Hibs.

However, the most famous individual associated with the club was Matt Busby, who played for the Hibs in 1928.

== Honours ==
- Scottish Junior Cup
  - Winner: 1930–31
  - Runner-up: 1911–12, 1928–29
- Scottish Junior League (East)
  - Winner: 1930–31
- Scottish Junior League Victory Cup
  - Winner: 1931–32
- Stirlingshire District League
  - Winner: 1910–11
- Stirlingshire District League Cup
  - Winner: 1925–26
- Stirlingshire Junior Cup
  - Winner: 1916–17, 1921–22, 1931–32

Stirling District Cup

  - Wunner: 1910–11, 1931–32
- Falkirk District Cup
  - Winner: 1916–17, 1923–24, 1930–31
- Clackmannanshire League
  - Winner: 1907–08
