= Lesmahagow F.C. =

Association football club in Scotland

Lesmahagow
- Full name: Lesmahagow Junior Football Club
- Nickname: The Gow
- Founded: 18 March 1930
- Ground: Craighead Park, Lesmahagow
- Coordinates: 55°38′31″N 3°52′58″W
- Chairman: Robert Irving
- Manager: Daryl Meikle
- League: West of Scotland League First Division
- 2025–26: West of Scotland League Second Division, 5th of 16 (promoted)
Home colours

Lesmahagow Junior Football Club is a Scottish and football and club based in the town of Lesmahagow, South Lanarkshire, seen just off the M74 motorway approximately 25 miles south of Glasgow.

== Early Clubs ==
Before the formation of the current club, three other clubs from Lesmahagow had played in the Junior grade for at least some of their history:

Nethanvale Swifts

Nethanvale Swifts were formed after a meeting held in the village on 23 September 1885, although it appears that their first match wasn't until New Year's Day 1886. They entered a short period of inactivity sometime after May 1890, before being ‘resurrected’ in February 1891 and joining the Lanarkshire Junior League for the 1891–92 season. By December 1891, they had left the league having lost the three games they had played (conceding 29 goals and scoring 3 in the process) and failing to turn up for another. By February 1892, it seems that they were playing Juvenile football and broke up shortly afterwards.

Swifts had at least two home grounds during their existence. The first known ground was "the field owned by Mr. Lambie", which was replaced by a second donated by either a Mr. McDonald, Ellenbank or a Mr. Donald of Elmbank in December 1891.

Nethanvale Thistle

On 9 April 1894 a new club, Nethanvale Thistle, placed a notice in the Scottish Referee seeking an opponent for a home game on 16 April. At least a couple of the players who had featured for the Swifts were also playing with the ‘new’ club, goalkeeper G. McNeish and Bobbie Hamilton, a ‘back’, among them.

Thistle played in the Lanarkshire Junior Alliance between 1894 and 1899 (withdrawing after 9 games of their final season). For the 1900–01 season, they played in the Strathaven & District Junior League and then entered a period of inactivity until 1905. They joined the Lanarkshire Junior League Division 2 in 1907–08. Following another break in 1915–16, the club had a final season in the Lanarkshire Junior League in 1916–17. After this the club appears to disappear from the Junior records, but a club operating under the same name were drawn away to Coalburn Thistle in the first round of the Lanarkshire Juvenile Cup in 1923.

Thistle reportedly played their home matches at Milton Park, a recreation ground opposite Lesmahagow Cemetery. By 1922, the first council houses had been constructed on the land, perhaps explaining at least part of the reason for the club's sad demise.

Lesmahagow United

Lesmahagow United became active in 1920, playing in the Auchenheath & District Juvenile League. For the 1922–23 season, they moved up to the Lanarkshire Junior League Second Division where they would remain for four relatively uneventful seasons before disbanding.

United's original home ground is reported to have been at Auldton before they later moved to Bogside.

== Lesmahagow Junior Football Club ==
Formation

On the evening of Tuesday 18 March 1930, "there was a large gathering at a meeting held in the I.O.G.T. Hall ... for the purpose of forming a football club. Mr John Thorburn occupied the chair. A field has been secured at Woodhead Farm, near New Trows. The following office-bearers were appointed: President, Mr Robert Whyte; vice-president, Mr John Thorburn; joint secretary, Mr H. Dyet and Mr James Murray; treasurer, Mr James Haldane; match secretary, Mr James Scanlon; committee—Messrs 'W. Colthart, James Brown, John Simpson, Robert Wylie, W. MacCormick, Gavin Pirrie, James Macintyre, Robert Laird, William Murray, Gavin Young, and Archie Clark. It was decided to hold a weekly dance for the purpose of raising funds. Several other proposals were left in the hands of the committee for inauguration."

Home Grounds

Between August 1930 and March 1932, the club played their home games at Woodhead. Since then, they have played at their current home of Craighead Park.

During 1930, the site of what is now Craighead Park had been identified as a potential location for a new football ground. The field was owned by Mr. Tom Walker of Craighead Mill and was subsequently leased from him. However, it presented a few challenges as far as a football pitch was concerned.

Firstly, the Galrig Burn, after coming under Carlisle Road, dropped quickly to the field, splitting it in two. To provide an area large enough for a pitch, the burn had to be diverted to the west side of the field. To the east side stood a hill of sand, known as Foxy Knowe. When a new channel for the burn was excavated, sand from here was used to fill in the old channel and to level the ground. To bring the sand down, a corrugated iron chute constructed and the sand shovelled into this.

Secondly, the village coup was at Craighead. At first, it was only at the main entrance to the field but gradually it was built right round the south and east sides. The local men who were volunteering to build Craighead Park found that as the coup gradually spread round the field, the slope was ideal for building a terracing. To create the terracing, many hours were spent bringing in large stones, Milton Primary was fairly new and a lot of left over stones were moved to Craighead as the first part of the terracing took shape.

Various other items would also ‘appear’ at the field; iron gates and posts arrived mysteriously, supports for the newly channelled burn were suddenly lying at the field. For materials that had to be bought, a few donations came in and fund raising events took place. In November 1930, a gramophone concert in the Jubilee Hall raised £8-0-1. In April 1931, a bazaar raised £56-11-4. By this time, it was confidently being predicted the field would be ready for the start of the next season.

On 5 March 1932, just over 18 months from their first league game against Burnbank Athletic (which they had lost 4–1), Lesmahagow defeated Lanark United 6–1 in a Lanarkshire Consolation Cup first round tie. The Carluke & Lanark Gazette reported that this game had been expected to mark the opening of the new ground. While that hadn't been the case, it would be the last home game played at Woodhead.

The first game played at Craighead Park was a Lanarkshire Junior League match against Newton Villa on 12 March 1932. At this time, there was no pavilion at the ground, with the players changing at Milton Mill on the other side of the River Nethan. A large attendance saw club Vice-president John Simpson ask Major Thomas Lander of Auchtyfardle to kick off. The match ended in a 0–0 draw, with the Public Band playing to entertain the supporters before the game and at half-time.

The Wishaw Press report of the 1933 Hozier Challenge Cup final between Douglas Water Thistle and Wishaw, which was held at Craighead rather than in Lanark as was normal, noted that "The field has a picturesque setting there being a natural terrace at one side that can accommodate thousands and which affords on excellent view. There is a rise on the pitch and some of the players appeared to have difficulty in keeping their feet although the day was sunny and dry." An Evening Times feature on the same final, which Douglas Water won, explained the reason for the change of venue for the final: "This was a tribute to the "Haigie" people, whose energies in preparing the place I had heard much about from ... the late Major Lander of Auchtyfardle".

League History

Lesmahagow Juniors have played league football in the Lanarkshire Junior League (1930–1968), Central Region Junior League (1968–2002), the West Region Junior League (2002–2020), and the West of Scotland Football League (2021–present).

The club currently plays in the West of Scotland League First Division.

Honours

- South Lanarkshire Hozier Challenge Cup: 1933/34, 1934/35, 1958/59
- Lanarkshire Junior League Cup: 1936/37
- Lanarkshire Junior Cup: 1938/39, 1947/48
- Lanarkshire Junior League: 1952/53
- West of Scotland Junior Cup: 1956/57
- Lanarkshire Central Cup: 1966/67
- Central Region 'Pint-A-Man' Trophy: 1969/70
- McLeod Trophy: 1973/74, 1974/75, 1975/76
- Central Region A Division: 1977/78
- Central Region B Division: 1981/82
- Central Region Championship: 1981/82
- Central Region Evening Times Cup Winners' Cup: 1981/82, 1992/93(bald)
- Central Region First Division: 1988/89
- Scottish Junior Cup: Runners-up 1989/90
- Clydesdale District Cup: 1990/91, 1991/92, 1993/94, 1996/97, 2006/07, 2014/15, 2015/16, 2017/18, 2023/24
- Central Region Premier Division: 1991/92
- Central Region League Cup: 1992/93
- Central Region Sectional League Cup: 1993/94
- West Region Central Division One: 2005/06
