= Forth Wanderers F.C. =

Association football club in Scotland

Forth Wanderers
- Full name: Forth Wanderers Football Club
- Nickname: Wanderers
- Founded: 1904
- Ground: Kingshill Park, Forth
- Coordinates: 55°46′14″N 3°40′56″W
- Manager: Gerry Ward
- League: West of Scotland League Second Division
- 2025–26: West of Scotland League Second Division, 16th of 16
Home colours	Away colours

Forth Wanderers Football Club are a Scottish football club based in the village of Forth, South Lanarkshire. Formed in 1904 they compete in the West of Scotland League Second Division and play in red strips with a white trim with a second strip of all black.

== History ==
Since 1934 they have played at Kingshill Park in the village, however they have had to share with Carluke Rovers for a spell and play on a public park in Carnwath when this ground proved unusable. The team's first games were played at Pleasure Park before the Wanderers moved to Hie Dyke in 1929. It was 5 years later until they moved to what is their current home, Kingshill Park in 1934.

Forth have supplied two Scottish international goalkeepers in George Wood and Rab Douglas. Rangers legend Willie Waddell came from the village and starred for the team in his pre-Ibrox days.

Wanderers reached the semi-finals of the Scottish Junior Cup in 1981 and their home quarter-final tie versus East Kilbride Thistle attracted a record crowd of 2,324.

The team is managed by Gerry Ward. On the 10th August 2026 the club signed Striker Kyle Lafferty from Johnstone Burgh for a club record fee.

== Current squad ==
As of 17th July 2026

Note: Flags indicate national team as defined under FIFA eligibility rules; some limited exceptions apply. Players may hold more than one non-FIFA nationality.

No.	Pos.	Nation	Player
1	GK	SCO	James Scott
2	DF	SCO	Marky Munro
3	DF	SCO	Connor Neilson
4	DF	SCO	Olly Tobin
5	DF	SCO	Terry Hewitt
6	MF	SCO	Tiger Lawson
7	FW	SCO	Eddie Ferns
8	MF	SCO	Nicki Paterson
9	FW	SCO	Kyle Caig
10	MF	SCO	Ross McKenzie
11	MF	SCO	Enzo Wright

No.	Pos.	Nation	Player
12	DF	SCO	Chad Shand
14	FW	SCO	Connor Phairs
15	MF	SCO	Micheal McMullin
16	DF	SCO	Danny McKenzie
17	FW	SCO	Jordon Love
18	MF	SCO	Kyle Lafferty
19	MF	SCO	Kyle Laughlin
20	GK	SCO	Craig Murdoch
21	DF	SCO	Aaron McFarlane
22	GK	SCO	Chris Smith
23	DF	SCO	Craig Forbes

== Honours ==
- Lanarkshire League winners: 1965–66
- Central League B Division winners: 1979–80
- Lanarkshire Junior Cup: 1959–60
- Lanarkshire Hozier Cup: 1913–14
- Central League Cup: 1984–85
- Scottish Junior Cup semi-finalists 1980–81
- Strathclyde Demolition Cup Runners-up: 2024-25

== Forth Wanderers Band ==
In a Reddit AMA in 2025, the indie band of the same name 'Forth Wanderers' admitted they decided on their name due to a "random wikipedia article generator" that spat them out to this very webpage, proving fan theories surrounding the name to be correctly associated with "the wanderers in forth, scotland". https://www.reddit.com/r/indieheads/comments/1mhg16o/we_are_forth_wanderers_ask_us_anything/

The USA band, originating in Montclair, NJ had a successful run from 2013 to 2018, before going on a 7 year long hiatus. The band returned to form, surprising fans with a new Bandcamp single titled: 'To Know Me/To Love Me' in 2025, followed by the release of a new album: 'The Longer This Goes On' on the 18th of July, 2025.
