= Burnbank Athletic F.C. =

Former association football club in Scotland

Burnbank Athletic
- Full name: Burnbank Athletic Football Club
- Founded: 1885 (as Burnbank Swifts)
- Dissolved: 1962
- Ground: Russell Park; Burnbank, Hamilton
Home colours

Burnbank Athletic Football Club was a Scottish football club based in the Burnbank area of Hamilton, South Lanarkshire. It played primarily in Scottish Junior Football Association competitions from 1885 until it went out of business in 1962, and won the Scottish Junior Cup on five occasions. The club started up again in 2004.

== History ==
=== Burnbank Swifts ===
Burnbank Swifts
- Full name: Burnbank Swifts Football Club
- Nickname(s): the Swifts
- Ground: Victoria Park
Home colours

Formed in 1885 as Burnbank Swifts, the club was one of the most successful sides in the early years of the Junior game. They provided four of the team which played England in the first Scotland Junior international fixture in May 1889, with forward Jock Espie scoring the side's first ever goal. Espie later enjoyed a career in England with Burnley and Manchester City while full-back Bob Foyers went on to play for Newcastle United and the Scotland senior side.

Having won the Scottish Junior Cup twice in succession in 1888–89 and 1889–90, the club turned to Senior football and entered the 1890–91 Scottish Cup. An 11–0 thrashing of United Abstainers was an auspicious debut and Burnbank eventually reached the fourth round before losing 1–0 to Royal Albert. The club finished the season on a high - beating Airdriehill 9–1 in the final of the Coatbridge Express Cup.

Swifts accepted an invitation to join the inaugural season of the Scottish Football Federation in 1891–92, and was considered one of the title favourites, which seemed to be borne out by the team winning its first match (against Kilmarnock Athletic) 7–1. However the season proved to be disastrous, and the club quit the Federation at the end of the season.

The Swifts flirted again with league football in 1895, joining the Scottish Football Alliance but again, only for one season.

=== Return to Junior football: Burnbank Athletic ===
The club returned to Junior football in 1898 and changed their name to Burnbank Athletic in 1900. This immediately preceded their third Scottish Junior Cup victory in 1900–01 and Athletic went on to win the trophy twice more in 1910–11 and 1944–45. The club went out of business in 1962.

Other former Burnbank players include Tommy Cairns, Bobby Shearer, Willie Telfer and Jimmy Watson who all went on to win full international caps for Scotland later in their careers.

== Colours ==
The club originally played in blue and white; after a season it changed to black and white, and from 1888 wore maroon shirts and navy shorts. On the club's return to junior football, it adopted black and gold, originally in stripes but gold shirts with black trim by the 1960s.

== Scottish Junior Cup finals record ==
Season	Opponent	Result
1888–89	West Benhar Violet	4–1
1889–90	Benburb	3–1 (replay after protest)
1900–01	Maryhill	2–0
1910–11	Petershill	1–0 (after 1–1 draw)
1927–28	Maryhill Hibernian	2–6
1930–31	Denny Hibernian	0–1 (match protested but not replayed)
1944–45	Cambuslang Rangers	3–1 (replay after protest)

== Honours ==
- Scottish Junior Cup winners: 1888–89, 1889–90, 1900–01, 1910–11, 1944–45
  - Runners-up: 1927–28, 1930–31
- Scottish Junior League winners: 1917–18
- Lanarkshire Junior League winners: 1896–97, 1900–01, 1901–02, 1902–03, 1903–04, 1911–12, 1915–16, 1928–29, 1940–41, 1946–47
- Lanarkshire Junior League Cup winners: 1928–29, 1958–59

== Former players ==
1. Players that have played/managed in the top two divisions of the Scottish Football League or any foreign equivalent to this level (i.e. fully professional league).
2. Players with full international caps.
3. Players that hold a club record or have captained the club.

- (Scotland) Joe Murray

== Sources ==
- Scottish Football Historical Archive
