= 1952–53 in Scottish football =

Division A champions
- Rangers

Division B champions
- Stirling Albion

Division C (North & East) champions
- Aberdeen 'A'

Division C (South & West) champions
- Rangers 'A'

Scottish Cup winners
- Rangers

League Cup winners
- Dundee

Division C League Cup winners
- Aberdeen 'A' or Rangers 'A'

Junior Cup winners
- Vale of Leven

Scotland national team
- 1953 BHC

The 1952–53 season was the 80th season of competitive football in Scotland and the 56th season of the Scottish Football League.

== Scottish League Division A ==
Rangers won the title with a 1–1 draw in their last match, away to Queen of the South. Rangers equalised with 17 minutes to go and thereby won the league on goal average from Hibernian, thus preventing Hibs from winning their third title in a row.

Pos	Team	Pld	W	D	L	GF	GA	GR	Pts
1	Rangers	30	18	7	5	80	39	2.051	43
2	Hibernian	30	19	5	6	93	51	1.824	43
3	East Fife	30	16	7	7	72	48	1.500	39
4	Heart of Midlothian	30	12	6	12	59	50	1.180	30
5	Clyde	30	13	4	13	78	78	1.000	30
6	St Mirren	30	11	8	11	52	58	0.897	30
7	Dundee	30	9	11	10	44	37	1.189	29
8	Celtic	30	11	7	12	51	54	0.944	29
9	Partick Thistle	30	10	9	11	55	63	0.873	29
10	Queen of the South	30	10	8	12	43	61	0.705	28
11	Aberdeen	30	11	5	14	64	68	0.941	27
12	Raith Rovers	30	9	8	13	47	53	0.887	26
13	Falkirk	30	11	4	15	53	63	0.841	26
14	Airdrieonians	30	10	6	14	53	75	0.707	26
15	Motherwell	30	10	5	15	57	80	0.713	25
16	Third Lanark	30	8	4	18	52	75	0.693	20

Source: RSSSF

Champions: Rangers
Relegated: Motherwell, Third Lanark

== Scottish League Division B ==
Pos	Team	Pld	W	D	L	GF	GA	GD	Pts	Promotion or relegation
1	Stirling Albion	30	20	4	6	64	43	+21	44	Promotion to the 1953–54 Division A
2	Hamilton Academical	30	20	3	7	72	40	+32	43	Promotion to the 1953–54 Division A
3	Queen's Park	30	15	7	8	70	46	+24	37	
4	Kilmarnock	30	17	2	11	74	48	+26	36	
5	Ayr United	30	17	2	11	76	56	+20	36	
6	Morton	30	15	3	12	79	57	+22	33	
7	Arbroath	30	13	7	10	52	57	−5	33	
8	Dundee United	30	12	5	13	52	56	−4	29	
9	Alloa Athletic	30	12	5	13	63	68	−5	29	
10	Dumbarton	30	11	6	13	58	67	−9	28	
11	Dunfermline Athletic	30	9	9	12	51	58	−7	27	
12	Stenhousemuir	30	10	6	14	56	65	−9	26	
13	Cowdenbeath	30	8	7	15	37	54	−17	23	
14	St Johnstone	30	8	6	16	41	63	−22	22	
15	Forfar Athletic	30	8	4	18	54	88	−34	20	
16	Albion Rovers	30	5	4	21	44	77	−33	14	

Source: "1952-1953 Division B - SPFL Archive". SPFL.

Promoted: Stirling Albion, Hamilton Academical

== Scottish League Division C ==
Section	Winner	Runner-up
South-West	Rangers 'A'	Partick Thistle 'A'
North-East	Aberdeen 'A'	Hibernian 'A'

== Cup honours ==
Competition	Winner	Score	Runner-up
Scottish Cup	Rangers	1 – 0 (rep.)	Aberdeen
League Cup	Dundee	2–0	Kilmarnock
Junior Cup	Vale of Leven	1–0	Annbank United

== Other Honours ==
=== National ===
Competition	Winner	Score	Runner-up
Scottish Qualifying Cup - North	Buckie Thistle	4 – 2 *	Inverness Thistle
Scottish Qualifying Cup - South	Peebles Rovers	6 – 5 *	Tarff Rovers
Coronation Cup	Celtic	2 – 0	Hibernian

=== County ===
Competition	Winner	Score	Runner-up
Aberdeenshire Cup	Buckie Thistle		
Ayrshire Cup	Kilmarnock	5 – 0 *	Ayr United
East of Scotland Shield	Hibernian	4 – 2	Hearts
Fife Cup	East Fife	1 – 1 ‡	Raith Rovers
Forfarshire Cup	Brechin City	2 – 1	Dundee United
Glasgow Cup	Partick Thistle	3 – 1	Rangers
Lanarkshire Cup	Motherwell	3 – 0	Albion Rovers
Renfrewshire Cup	Morton	2 – 0	Babcock & Wilcox
Stirlingshire Cup	Dumbarton	3 – 1	East Stirling

- * - aggregate over two legs
- ‡ - trophy shared

=== Highland League ===
Top Three
Pos	Team	Pld	W	D	L	GF	GA	GD	Pts
1	Elgin City	28	23	1	4	84	37	+47	47
2	Buckie Thistle	28	18	5	5	88	36	+52	41
3	Inverness Caledonian	28	19	3	6	86	44	+42	41

== Scotland national team ==
Date	Venue	Opponents	Score	Competition	Scotland scorer(s)
18 November 1952	Ninian Park, Cardiff (A)	Wales	2–1	BHC	Billy Liddell, Allan Brown
5 November 1952	Hampden Park, Glasgow (H)	Northern Ireland	1–1	BHC	Lawrie Reilly
18 April 1953	Wembley Stadium, London (A)	England	2–2	BHC	Lawrie Reilly (2)
6 May 1953	Hampden Park, Glasgow (H)	Sweden	1–2	Friendly	Bobby Johnstone

Scotland and England shared victory in the 1953 British Home Championship.

Key:

- (H) = Home match
- (A) = Away match
- BHC = British Home Championship
