= Blantyre Celtic F.C. =

Former association football club in Scotland

Coordinates: 55.792517°N 4.078640°W

Blantyre Celtic
- Full name: Blantyre Celtic Football Club
- Founded: 1914 (as Blantyre United)
- Dissolved: 1993
- Ground: Craighead Park; Blantyre
- League: Lanarkshire Junior League; 1914–1928; Scottish Intermediate League; 1928–1931; Central Junior League; 1931–1988, 1991–92
Home colours

Blantyre Celtic Football Club was a Scottish football club Blantyre, South Lanarkshire which played under the auspices of the Scottish Junior Football Association.

== History ==
Formed in 1914 as Blantyre United, the club changed its name to Blantyre Celtic two years later. IIts local rival was Blantyre Victoria, known locally as the Vics. In many ways they were the poorer cousin, as they existed in a poorer area of the village and lacked the financial support that the Vics gained from having a large social club attached to their home ground.

The club reached the semi-finals of the Scottish Junior Cup three times: (1923–24, 1937–38 and 1945–46) but lost on each occasion. The football side collapsed near the end of the 1992–93 season; the Celts could only muster 8 players for a Central League match at Johnstone Burgh in April, and rather than turning up, rang to withdraw from the fixture 20 minutes before kick-off, when the Burgh players were already on the pitch. As this was the third time in the season the Celts had withdrawn from a fixture, the Central League suspended the club, and at the end of the season, expunged the club's record (which stood at 7 points - all from draws - after 13 games), and turned down an application to re-join for the 1993–94 season. The Celtic social club continued; the football debt was not settled until the sale of the club's ground in 1998.

In 2010, the club reformed as an amateur team in the Blantyre area.

== Colours ==
Blantyre Celtic played in green and white hoops, identical to those of their namesake Celtic.

== Ground ==
After spending 3 years at St Joseph's Church Hall, the club moved to Craighead Park, which (between 1982 and 1986) as also used by the Glasgow Tigers speedway team as their home track. The cost of purchase of the new ground was met by pitmen giving up a day's wages to contribute to the fund.

== Honours ==
- Lanarkshire Junior Football League winners: 1916–17
- Central Junior League winners: 1948–49
- William Blaney " Good Conduct Trophy" winners 1968

== Former players ==
1. Players that have played/managed in the top two divisions of the Scottish Football League or any foreign equivalent to this level (i.e. fully professional league).
2. Players with full international caps.
3. Players that hold a club record or have captained the club.

- (Scotland) Tom Adamson
- (Scotland) Jimmy Johnstone
- (Scotland) Doug Fraser
- (Scotland) Joe Murray
- (Scotland) Adam Plunkett
- (Scotland) Willie Smith
- (Scotland) Paul Wilson

== Sources ==
- Scottish Football Historical Archive
