= Scottish Junior Cup =

- Organiser(s): Scottish Junior Football Association
- Founded: 1886 (140 years ago)
- Region: Scotland
- Teams: 127 (2024–25)
- Current champions: Auchinleck Talbot (15th title)
- Most championships: Auchinleck Talbot (15 titles)

The Scottish Junior Cup is an annual football competition organised by the Scottish Junior Football Association (SJFA). The competition has been held every year since the inception of the SJFA on the 2nd October 1886 and, as of the 2023–24 edition, 112 teams compete in the tournament. The cup has an unseeded knockout format with no replays, semi-finals played over two legs, and the final usually played at a neutral venue of an SPFL club.

Since the 2006–07 season, the winner of the Junior Cup Final has qualified for the following season's senior Scottish Cup. The competition is named the Clydebuilt Home Improvements Scottish Junior Cup for sponsorship reasons.

Auchinleck Talbot are the current holders.

== Format ==
The competition is open to all member clubs of Scottish Junior Football Association, and all clubs in tier 6 and below in the Scottish pyramid system on payment of entry fee, subject to the approval of the committee.

Matches which are tied after 90 minutes proceed directly to penalty kicks, and semi-finals take place over two legs. Prior to the 2020–21 season, drawn matches were replayed.

== History ==
The Cup has been competed for since the 1886–87 season, when Fairfield Govan became the first winners. The SJFA purchased an exact replica in 2007, to replace the original which was showing its age.

Auchinleck Talbot are the most successful club, winning the trophy 15 times to date, including three times in a row from 1986 to 1988 and 2018 to 2022 (no team won in 2020 and 2021 due to the COVID-19 pandemic).

The record attendance for a Junior Cup Final is 77,650 for the 1951 final between Petershill and Irvine Meadow XI.

== Sponsorship ==
The cup's long-term sponsor, the OVD Rum company, which, as of 2006, had an eighteen-year-long association with the competition, withdrew their backing before the start of the 2006–07 competition. Unlike most other sponsored contests whose names change often, OVD had become so ingrained into the Scottish Junior Cup that it was often simply referred to as the "OVD Junior Cup". The Scottish Junior Football Association announced in 2006 that they would provide the sponsorship and prize money themselves, meaning the cup would be known simply as the Scottish Junior Cup. A new sponsor was found during the 2006–07 competition for the semi-finals and final - Scottish Citylink, a long-distance coach operator. The competition was sponsored by Emirates between 2009 and 2013. The tournament was without a sponsor in 2013–14, with Barr Construction sponsoring the final only, then the SJFA entered a partnership with Dementia Scotland for the latter stages of the 2014–15 competition.

The cup had been without a sponsor since ETHX Energy sponsored the 2015–16 competition. However, from 2018, sportswear company Macron sponsored the tournament for three seasons.

== Finals ==
- (R) = Won after a replay/2nd replay.
- (aet) = Result after extra time.
- (P) = Won on penalties.

Season	Winner	Score	Runner-up	Venue	Attendance	League
1886–87	Fairfield Govan	3–1 (Note: Result protested.)	Edinburgh Woodburn	Argyle Park (Govan)		N/A
1886–87	Fairfield Govan	3–1 (R)	Edinburgh Woodburn	Argyle Park (Govan)		N/A
1887–88	Wishaw Thistle	3–2	Maryhill	Gasworks Park (Larkhall)		N/A
1887–88	Wishaw Thistle	1–2 (R)	Maryhill	Gasworks Park (Larkhall)		N/A
1887–88	Wishaw Thistle	3–1 (2R)	Maryhill	Ibrox Park (I)		N/A
1888–89	Burnbank Swifts	4–1	West Benhar Violet	Gasworks Park (Larkhall)		N/A
1889–90	Burnbank Swifts	3–0	Benburb	West End Park Hamilton)	13,000	N/A
1889–90	Burnbank Swifts	3–1 (R)	Benburb	Raploch Park (Larkhall)	14,500	N/A
1890–91	Vale of Clyde	1–1	Chryston Athletic	Ibrox Park (I)	11,000	N/A
1890–91	Vale of Clyde	2–0 (R)	Chryston Athletic	Whitefield Park	12,500	N/A
1891–92	Minerva	5–2	West Benhar Violet	Cathkin Park (I)		N/A
1892–93	Vale of Clyde	3–0	Dumbarton Fern	Boghead Park		Scottish
1893–94	Ashfield	3–0	Renfrew Victoria	Underwood Park (Paisley)		N/A
1894–95	Ashfield	1–1	West Calder Wanderers	Underwood Park (Paisley)		N/A
1894–95	Ashfield	2–1 (R)	West Calder Wanderers	Tynecastle Park	9,856	N/A
1895–96	Cambuslang Hibs	2–1	Parkhead	Celtic Park	11,000	Glasgow
1896–97	Strathclyde	3–2	Dunfermline Juniors	Celtic Park		Glasgow
1896–97	Strathclyde	3–0 (R)	Dunfermline Juniors	Tynecastle Park		Glasgow
1897–98	Dalziel Rovers	2–1	Parkhead	Meadowside	7,000	Lanarkshire
1898–99	Parkhead	4–1	Westmarch XI	Meadowside	12,650	Glasgow
1899–1900	Maryhill	3–2	Kilmarnock Rugby XI	St Mirren Park (Love Street)	11,000	Glasgow
1900–01	Burnbank Athletic	2–0	Maryhill	Exhibition Ground (Glasgow)	13,000	Lanarkshire
1901–02	Rutherglen Glencairn	1–0	Maryhill	Meadowside	13,000	Glasgow
1902–03	Parkhead	3–0	Larkhall Thistle	Meadowside	11,000	Glasgow
1903–04	Vale of Clyde	3–0	Parkhead	Celtic Park	10,000	Glasgow
1904–05	Ashfield	2–1	Renfrew Victoria	Meadowside	12,000	Glasgow
1905–06	Dunipace Juniors	2–2	Kirkintilloch Rob Roy	Meadowside	9,000	Stirlingshire
1905–06	Dunipace Juniors	1–0 (R)	Kirkintilloch Rob Roy	Brockville Park	9,000	Stirlingshire
1906–07	Strathclyde	1–1	Maryhill	Meadowside	15,000	Glasgow
1906–07	Strathclyde	1–1 (R)	Maryhill	Meadowside		Glasgow
1906–07	Strathclyde	1–0 (2R)	Maryhill	Meadowside	8,000	Glasgow
1907–08	Larkhall Thistle	1–0	Queen's Park Hampden XI	Meadowside	7,000	Lanarkshire (Note: Glasgow Junior Football League teams did not enter.)
1908–09	Kilwinning Rangers	0–0	Strathclyde	Shawfield Stadium	12,000	Irvine & District
1908–09	Kilwinning Rangers	1–0 (R)	Strathclyde	Rugby Park	8,000	Irvine & District
1909–10	Ashfield	0–1	Kilwinning Rangers	Firhill Stadium	20,000	Glasgow
1909–10	Ashfield	3–0 (R)	Kilwinning Rangers	Firhill Stadium	18,000	Glasgow
1910–11	Burnbank Athletic	1–1	Petershill	Firhill Stadium	16,000	Lanarkshire
1910–11	Burnbank Athletic	1–0 (R)	Petershill	Firhill Stadium	7,000	Lanarkshire
1911–12	Petershill	5–0	Denny Hibs	Firhill Stadium	15,000	Glasgow
1912–13	Inverkeithing United	1–0	Dunipace Juniors	Firhill Stadium	15,000	Fife
1913–14	Larkhall Thistle	1–1	Ashfield	Firhill Stadium	25,000	Lanarkshire
1913–14	Larkhall Thistle	0–0 (R)	Ashfield	Firhill Stadium	20,000	Lanarkshire
1913–14	Larkhall Thistle	1–0 (2R)	Ashfield	Cathkin Park	17,000	Lanarkshire
1914–15	Parkhead	2–0	Port Glasgow Athletic	Firhill Stadium	25,000	Glasgow
1915–16	Petershill	2–0	Parkhead	Firhill Stadium	24,000	Glasgow
1916–17	St Mirren Juniors	0–0	Renfrew	Firhill Stadium	30,000	Scottish
1916–17	St Mirren Juniors	1–0 (R)	Renfrew	Firhill Stadium	20,000	Scottish
1917–18	Petershill	N/A	(no final played)	N/A	N/A	Glasgow
1918–19	Rutherglen Glencairn	1–1	St Anthony's	Hampden Park	39,969	Glasgow
1918–19	Rutherglen Glencairn	1–0 (R)	St Anthony's	Hampden Park	35,000	Glasgow
1919–20	Parkhead	2–0	Cambuslang Rangers	Hampden Park	22,453	Glasgow
1920–21	Kirkintilloch Rob Roy	1–0	Ashfield	Hampden Park	26,000	Glasgow
1921–22	St Roch's	2–1	Kilwinning Rangers	Firhill Stadium	15,000	Scottish
1921–22	St Roch's	2–1 (R)	Kilwinning Rangers	Firhill Stadium	25,000	Scottish
1922–23	Musselburgh Bruntonians	2–0	Arniston Rangers	Tynecastle Park	20,000	East of Scotland
1923–24	Parkhead	1–1	Baillieston Juniors	Firhill Stadium	12,000	Glasgow
1923–24	Parkhead	3–1 (R)	Baillieston Juniors	Firhill Stadium	12,000	Glasgow
1924–25	Saltcoats Victoria	1–1	St Anthony's	Firhill Stadium	18,000	Western
1924–25	Saltcoats Victoria	3–3 (R) (aet)	St Anthony's	St Mirren Park (Love Street)	12,000	Western
1924–25	Saltcoats Victoria	2–1 (2R)	St Anthony's	Firhill Stadium	21,000	Western
1925–26	Strathclyde	1–1	Bridgeton Waverley	Firhill Stadium	30,000	Glasgow
1925–26	Strathclyde	2–0 (R)	Bridgeton Waverley	Firhill Stadium	20,000	Glasgow
1926–27	Rutherglen Glencairn	2–1	Cambuslang Rangers	Hampden Park	25,000	Glasgow
1927–28	Maryhill Hibernians	6–2	Burnbank Athletic	Firhill Stadium	8,000	Scottish (Note: Clubs involved in the Intermediate dispute did not take part.)
1928–29	Dundee Violet	2–0	Denny Hibs	Tynecastle Park	8,000	Dundee
1928–29	Dundee Violet	2–2 (R)	Denny Hibs	Dens Park	10,341	Dundee
1928–29	Dundee Violet	4–0 (2R)	Denny Hibs	Dens Park	9,556	Dundee
1929–30	Newtongrange Star	3–0	Hall Russell	Tynecastle Park	17,000	Midlothian
1930–31	Denny Hibs	1–0	Burnbank Athletic	Tynecastle Park	10,000	Scottish
1931–32	Glasgow Perthshire	2–1	Kirkintilloch Rob Roy	Firhill Stadium	13,000	Central (I)
1932–33	Yoker Athletic	0–0	Tranent	Tynecastle Park	22,128	Central (I)
1932–33	Yoker Athletic	4–2 (R)	Tranent	Hampden Park	11,849	Central (I)
1933–34	Benburb	3–1	Bridgeton Waverley	Ibrox Stadium	13,000	Central (I)
1934–35	Tranent	6–1	Petershill	Ibrox Stadium	22,000	Midlothian
1935–36	Benburb	1–1	Yoker Athletic	Hampden Park	16,000	Central (I)
1935–36	Benburb	1–0 (R)	Yoker Athletic	Hampden Park	12,000	Central (I)
1936–37	Arthurlie	5–1	Kirkintilloch Rob Roy	Celtic Park	28,508	Central (I)
1937–38	Cambuslang Rangers	3–2	Benburb	Celtic Park	28,058	Central (I)
1938–39	Rutherglen Glencairn	2–1	Shawfield	Celtic Park	22,363	Central (I)
1939–40	Maryhill	1–0	Morton Juniors	Celtic Park	26,000	Central (I)
1940–41	Glasgow Perthshire	2–2	Armadale Thistle	Firhill Stadium	22,000	Central (I)
1940–41	Glasgow Perthshire	0–0 (R)	Armadale Thistle	Firhill Stadium	8,000	Central (I)
1940–41	Glasgow Perthshire	3–1 (2R)	Armadale Thistle	Tynecastle Park	15,000	Central (I)
1941–42	Clydebank Juniors	4–2	Vale of Clyde	Shawfield Stadium	24,579	Central (I)
1942–43	Kirkintilloch Rob Roy	1–1	Benburb	Shawfield Stadium	15,000	Central (I)
1942–43	Kirkintilloch Rob Roy	0–0 (R)	Benburb	Hampden Park	15,000	Central (I)
1942–43	Kirkintilloch Rob Roy	3–1 (2R)	Benburb	Hampden Park	25,000	Central (I)
1943–44	Glasgow Perthshire	1–0	Blantyre Victoria	Hampden Park	32,000	Central (I)
1944–45	Burnbank Athletic	1–2	Cambuslang Rangers	Hampden Park	32,650	Lanarkshire
1944–45	Burnbank Athletic	3–1 (R)	Cambuslang Rangers	Hampden Park	25,000	Lanarkshire
1945–46	Fauldhouse United	2–0	Arthurlie	Hampden Park	46,326	East of Scotland
1946–47	Shawfield	1–1	Bo'ness United	Hampden Park	56,410	Central (I)
1946–47	Shawfield	2–1 (R)	Bo'ness United	Hampden Park	26,521	Central (I)
1947–48	Bo'ness United	2–1	Irvine Meadow	Hampden Park	55,602	Edinburgh & District
1948–49	Auchinleck Talbot	3–2	Petershill	Hampden Park	68,837	Western
1949–50	Blantyre Victoria	3–0	Cumnock Juniors	Hampden Park	44,402	Central (I)
1950–51	Petershill	1–0	Irvine Meadow	Hampden Park	77,650	Central (I)
1951–52	Kilbirnie Ladeside	1–0	Camelon Juniors	Hampden Park	69,959	Western
1952–53	Vale of Leven	1–0	Annbank United	Hampden Park	55,800	Central (I)
1953–54	Sunnybank	2–1	Lochee Harp	Hampden Park	22,600	Aberdeen & District
1954–55	Kilsyth Rangers	0–0	Duntocher Hibs	Hampden Park	64,976	Central (I)
1954–55	Kilsyth Rangers	4–1 (R)	Duntocher Hibs	Hampden Park	30,000	Central (I)
1955–56	Petershill	4–1	Lugar Boswell Thistle	Hampden Park	64,702	Central (I)
1956–57	Banks o' Dee	1–0	Kilsyth Rangers	Hampden Park	30,800	Aberdeen & District
1957–58	Shotts Bon Accord	2–0	Pumpherston	Hampden Park	33,000	Lanarkshire
1958–59	Irvine Meadow	2–1	Shettleston	Hampden Park	65,211	Western
1959–60	St Andrews United	3–1	Greenock Juniors	Hampden Park	34,603	Fife
1960–61	Dunbar United	2–2	Cambuslang Rangers	Hampden Park	20,000	Edinburgh & District
1960–61	Dunbar United	2–0 (R)	Cambuslang Rangers	Hampden Park	23,122	Edinburgh & District
1961–62	Kirkintilloch Rob Roy	1–1	Renfrew	Hampden Park	49,000	Central (I)
1961–62	Kirkintilloch Rob Roy	1–0 (R)	Renfrew	Hampden Park	19,500	Central (I)
1962–63	Irvine Meadow	2–1	Glenafton Athletic	Hampden Park	21,384	Western
1963–64	Johnstone Burgh	1–1	Cambuslang Rangers	Hampden Park	49,115	Central (I)
1963–64	Johnstone Burgh	3–0 (R)	Cambuslang Rangers	Hampden Park	23,000	Central (I)
1964–65	Linlithgow Rose	4–1	Baillieston Juniors	Hampden Park	35,000	Edinburgh & District
1965–66	Bonnyrigg Rose Athletic	1–1	Whitburn	Hampden Park	19,430	Edinburgh & District
1965–66	Bonnyrigg Rose Athletic	6–1 (R)	Whitburn	Hampden Park	10,000	Edinburgh & District
1966–67	Kilsyth Rangers	1–1	Rutherglen Glencairn	Hampden Park	22,000	Central (I)
1966–67	Kilsyth Rangers	3–1 (R)	Rutherglen Glencairn	Hampden Park	11,500	Central (I)
1967–68	Johnstone Burgh	2–2	Glenrothes	Hampden Park	28,800	Central (I)
1967–68	Johnstone Burgh	4–3 (R)	Glenrothes	Hampden Park	21,720	Central (I)
1968–69	Cambuslang Rangers	1–0	Kirkintilloch Rob Roy	Hampden Park	32,524	Central (II)
1969–70	Blantyre Victoria	1–1	Penicuik Athletic	Hampden Park		Central (II)
1969–70	Blantyre Victoria	1–0 (R)	Penicuik Athletic	Hampden Park	14,225	Central (II)
1970–71	Cambuslang Rangers	2–1	Newtongrange Star	Hampden Park	24,676	Central (II)
1971–72	Cambuslang Rangers	1–1	Bonnyrigg Rose Athletic	Hampden Park	20,000	Central (II)
1971–72	Cambuslang Rangers	3–2 (R)	Bonnyrigg Rose Athletic	Hampden Park	14,000	Central (II)
1972–73	Irvine Meadow	2–2	Cambuslang Rangers	Hampden Park	22,242	Ayrshire
1972–73	Irvine Meadow	3–3 (R) (aet)	Cambuslang Rangers	Hampden Park		Ayrshire
1972–73	Irvine Meadow	1–0 (2R)	Cambuslang Rangers	Hampden Park	24,917	Ayrshire
1973–74	Cambuslang Rangers	3–1	Linlithgow Rose	Hampden Park	22,830	Central (II)
1974–75	Glenrothes	1–0	Rutherglen Glencairn	Hampden Park	17,776	Fife
1975–76	Bo'ness United	3–0	Darvel	Hampden Park	20,161	East
1976–77	Kilbirnie Ladeside	3–1	Kirkintilloch Rob Roy	Hampden Park	11,476	Ayrshire
1977–78	Bonnyrigg Rose Athletic	1–0	Stonehouse Violet	Hampden Park	8,325	East
1978–79	Cumnock Juniors	1–0	Bo'ness United	Hampden Park	13,692	Ayrshire
1979–80	Baillieston Juniors	2–2	Benburb	Hampden Park	10,702	Central (II)
1979–80	Baillieston Juniors	2–0 (R) (aet)	Benburb	Hampden Park	9,367	Central (II)
1980–81	Pollok	1–0	Arthurlie	Hampden Park	13,518	Central (II)
1981–82	Blantyre Victoria	1–0	Baillieston Juniors	Ibrox Stadium	10,000	Central (II)
1982–83	East Kilbride Thistle	2–0	Bo'ness United	Ibrox Stadium	15,000	Central (II)
1983–84	Bo'ness United	2–0	Baillieston Juniors	Ibrox Stadium	15,000	East
1984–85	Pollok	1–1	Petershill	Hampden Park	8,907	Central (II)
1984–85	Pollok	3–1 (R)	Petershill	Hampden Park	7,004	Central (II)
1985–86 (Note: Centenary competition)	Auchinleck Talbot	3–2	Pollok	Hampden Park	7,689	Ayrshire
1986–87	Auchinleck Talbot	1–1	Kilbirnie Ladeside	Rugby Park		Ayrshire
1986–87	Auchinleck Talbot	1–0 (R)	Kilbirnie Ladeside			Ayrshire
1987–88	Auchinleck Talbot	1–0	Petershill			Ayrshire
1988–89	Cumnock Juniors	1–0	Ormiston Primrose	Rugby Park	8,300	Ayrshire
1989–90	Hill of Beath Hawthorn	1–0	Lesmahagow	Rugby Park		Fife
1990–91	Auchinleck Talbot	1–0	Newtongrange Star	Brockville Park	8,500	Ayrshire
1991–92	Auchinleck Talbot	4–0	Glenafton Athletic	Firhill Stadium	6,966	Ayrshire
1992–93	Glenafton Athletic	1–0	Tayport	Firhill Stadium	6,250	Ayrshire
1993–94	Largs Thistle	1–0	Glenafton Athletic	Ibrox Stadium	8,668	Ayrshire
1994–95	Camelon Juniors	2–0	Whitburn	Fir Park	8,018	East
1995–96	Tayport	2–0 (aet)	Camelon Juniors	Fir Park	4,652	Tayside
1996–97	Pollok	3–1	Tayport	Fir Park	3,523	Central (II)
1997–98	Arthurlie	4–0	Pollok	Fir Park	4,751	Central (II)
1998–99	Kilwinning Rangers	1–0	Kelty Hearts	Firhill Stadium	7,525	Ayrshire
1999–2000	Whitburn	2–2 (P)	Johnstone Burgh	Firhill Stadium	7,012	East
2000–01	Renfrew	0–0 (P)	Carnoustie Panmure	Firhill Stadium	5,252	Central (II)
2001–02	Linlithgow Rose	1–0	Auchinleck Talbot	Firhill Stadium	6,966	East
2002–03	Tayport	1–0 (aet)	Linlithgow Rose	Firhill Stadium	4,613	East Region
2003–04	Carnoustie Panmure	0–0 (P)	Tayport	Firhill Stadium	3,030	East Region
2004–05	Tayport	2–0	Lochee United	Tannadice Park	6,868	East Region
2005–06	Auchinleck Talbot	2–1	Bathgate Thistle	Rugby Park	7,469	West Region
2006–07	Linlithgow Rose	2–1 (aet)	Kelty Hearts	East End Park	9,304	East Region
2007–08	Bathgate Thistle	2–1	Cumnock Juniors	Rugby Park	6,117	East Region
2008–09	Auchinleck Talbot	2–1	Clydebank	Rugby Park	8,122	West Region
2009–10	Linlithgow Rose	1–0	Largs Thistle	Rugby Park	5,788	East Region
2010–11 (Note: 125th Anniversary competition)	Auchinleck Talbot	2–1 (aet)	Musselburgh Athletic	Rugby Park	6,025	West Region
2011–12	Shotts Bon Accord	2–1	Auchinleck Talbot	Almondvale Stadium	4,026	West Region
2012–13	Auchinleck Talbot	1–0	Linlithgow Rose	Almondvale Stadium	6,492	West Region
2013–14	Hurlford United	3–0	Glenafton Athletic	Rugby Park	5,854	West Region
2014–15	Auchinleck Talbot	2–1	Musselburgh Athletic	Rugby Park	5,186	West Region
2015–16	Beith Juniors	1–1 (P)	Pollok	Rugby Park	4,877	West Region
2016–17	Glenafton Athletic	2–1	Auchinleck Talbot	Rugby Park	6,144	West Region
2017–18	Auchinleck Talbot	3–2	Hurlford United	Rugby Park	4,874	West Region
2018–19	Auchinleck Talbot	2–0	Largs Thistle	New Douglas Park	4,629	West Region
2019–20	Competition postponed at the semi-final stage due to the COVID-19 pandemic and later cancelled					
2020–21	No competition due to the COVID-19 pandemic					
2021–22	Auchinleck Talbot	2–0	Yoker Athletic	Rugby Park	3,500	West of Scotland
2022–23	Cumnock Juniors	1–0	Rutherglen Glencairn	Broadwood Stadium	4,034	West of Scotland
2023–24	Darvel	2–1	Arthurlie	Broadwood Stadium	3,491	West of Scotland
2024–25	Johnstone Burgh	1–1 (P)	Tranent	Broadwood Stadium	4,538	West of Scotland
2025–26	Auchinleck Talbot	2–1	Largs Thistle	Broadwood Stadium	3,481	West of Scotland

== Club performance ==
As of after 2025–26

Clubs which are currently members of the SJFA are indicated in bold.

Club	Winner	Runner-up	League (when winner) (Note: SJFA league in which the club was playing each time they won the Scottish Cup.)
**Auchinleck Talbot**	**15**	3	Western (1); Ayrshire (5); West Region (7); West of Scotland (2)
**Cambuslang Rangers**	5	**6**	Central (I) (1); Central (II) (4)
**Petershill**	5	5	Glasgow (3); Central (I) (2)
Parkhead	5	4	Glasgow (5)
Burnbank Swifts / Burnbank Athletic	5	2	Lanarkshire (5)
Linlithgow Rose	4	3	Edinburgh & District (1); East (1); East Region (2)
Rutherglen Glencairn	4	3	Glasgow (3); Central (I) (1)
**Ashfield**	4	2	Glasgow (4)
**Kirkintilloch Rob Roy**	3	5	Glasgow (1); Central (I) (2)
Bo'ness United	3	3	Edinburgh & District (1); East (2)
**Pollok**	3	3	Central (II) (3)
**Tayport**	3	3	Tayside (1); East Region (2)
**Cumnock Juniors**	3	2	Ayrshire (2); West of Scotland (1)
**Irvine Meadow XI**	3	2	Western (2); Ayrshire (2)
**Blantyre Victoria**	3	1	Central (I) (1); Central (II) (2)
**Johnstone Burgh**	3	1	Central (I) (2); West of Scotland (1)
Strathclyde	3	1	Glasgow (3)
Vale of Clyde	3	1	Glasgow (3)
**Glasgow Perthshire**	3	0	Central (3)
**Benburb**	2	4	Central (I) (2)
**Glenafton Athletic**	2	4	Ayrshire (1); West Region (1)
**Maryhill**	2	4	Glasgow (1); Central (I) (1)
**Arthurlie**	2	3	Central (I) (1); Central (II) (1)
Kilwinning Rangers	2	2	Irvine & District (1); Ayrshire (1)
Bonnyrigg Rose Athletic	2	1	Edinburgh & District (1); East (1)
**Kilbirnie Ladeside**	2	1	Western (1); Ayrshire (1)
**Kilsyth Rangers**	2	1	Central (I) (2)
**Larkhall Thistle**	2	1	Lanarkshire (2)
**Shotts Bon Accord**	2	0	Lanarkshire (1); West Region (1)
Baillieston Juniors	1	4	Central (I) (1)
**Largs Thistle**	1	3	Ayrshire (1)
Camelon Juniors	1	2	East (1)
Denny Hibs	1	2	Scottish (1)
Musselburgh Bruntonians / Musselburgh Athletic	1	2	East of Scotland (1)
Newtongrange Star	1	2	Midlothian (1)
**Renfrew**	1	2	Central (II) (1)
Tranent	1	2	Midlothian (1)
Whitburn	1	2	East (1)
**Yoker Athletic**	1	2	Central (I) (1)
**Bathgate Thistle**	1	1	East Region (1)
**Carnoustie Panmure**	1	1	East Region (1)
Clydebank	1	1	Central (I) (1)
Darvel	1	1	West of Scotland (1)
Dunipace Juniors	1	1	Stirlingshire (1)
Glenrothes	1	1	Fife (1)
**Hurlford United**	1	1	West Region (1)
Shawfield	1	1	Central (I) (1)
**Banks o' Dee**	1	0	Aberdeen (1)
**Beith Juniors**	1	0	West Region (1)
Cambuslang Hibs	1	0	Glasgow (1)
Dalziel Rovers	1	0	Lanarkshire (1)
Dunbar United	1	0	Edinburgh & District (1)
**Dundee Violet**	1	0	Dundee (1)
**East Kilbride Thistle**	1	0	Central (II) (1)
Fairfield Govan	1	0	N/A
**Fauldhouse United**	1	0	East of Scotland (1)
Hill of Beath Hawthorn	1	0	Fife (1)
Inverkeithing United	1	0	Fife (1)
Maryhill Hibernians	1	0	Scottish (1)
Minerva	1	0	N/A
**Saltcoats Victoria**	1	0	Ayrshire (1)
St Andrews United	1	0	Fife (1)
St Mirren Juniors	1	0	Scottish (1)
**St Roch's**	1	0	Scottish (1)
**Sunnybank**	1	0	Aberdeen (1)
**Vale of Leven**	1	0	Central (I) (1)
**Wishaw Thistle**	1	0	N/A
Bridgeton Waverley	0	2	N/A
Kelty Hearts	0	2	N/A
Renfrew Victoria	0	2	N/A
**St Anthony's**	0	2	N/A
West Benhar Violet	0	2	N/A
**Annbank United**	0	1	N/A
**Armadale Thistle**	0	1	N/A
Arniston Rangers	0	1	N/A
Chryston Athletic	0	1	N/A
Dumbarton Fern	0	1	N/A
Dunfermline Juniors	0	1	N/A
Duntocher Hibs	0	1	N/A
Edinburgh Woodburn	0	1	N/A
**Greenock Juniors**	0	1	N/A
**Hall Russell**	0	1	N/A
Kilmarnock Rugby XI	0	1	N/A
**Lesmahagow**	0	1	N/A
**Lochee Harp**	0	1	N/A
**Lochee United**	0	1	N/A
**Lugar Boswell Thistle**	0	1	N/A
Morton Juniors	0	1	N/A
Ormiston Primrose	0	1	N/A
Penicuik Athletic	0	1	N/A
Port Glasgow Athletic	0	1	N/A
**Pumpherston**	0	1	N/A
Queen's Park Hampden XI	0	1	N/A
**Shettleston**	0	1	N/A
Stonehouse Violet	0	1	N/A
West Calder Wanderers	0	1	N/A
Westmarch XI	0	1	N/A

== League performance ==
As of after 2025–26

League in which Cup winner played	Operating years	Clubs (Note: Total number of clubs who won the Scottish Cup while attached to the league.)	Years (Note: Total number of years in which a club from the league won the Scottish Cup.)
Central (I)	1931–1968	15 (Note: Glasgow Perthshire, Yoker Athletic, Benburb, Athurlie, Cambuslang Rangers, Rutherglen Glencairn, Maryhill, Clydebank Juniors, Kirkintilloch Rob Roy, Shawfield, Blantyre Victoria, Petershill, Vale of Leven, Kilsyth Rangers, Johnstone Burgh.)	22 (Note: 1931–32, 1932–33, 1933–34, 1935–36, 1936–37, 1937–38, 1938–39, 1939–40, 1940–41, 1941–42, 1942–43, 1943–44, 1946–47, 1949–50, 1950–51, 1952–53, 1954–55, 1955–56, 1961–62, 1963–64, 1966–67, 1967–68.)
Glasgow	1895–1927	9 (Note: Cambuslang Hibs, Strathclyde, Parkhead, Maryhill, Rutherglen Glencairn, Vale of Clyde, Ashfield, Petershill, Kirkintilloch Rob Roy.)	20 (Note: 1895–96, 1896–97, 1898–99, 1899–1900, 1901–02, 1902–03, 1903–04, 1904–05, 1906–07, 1909–10, 1911–12, 1914–15, 1915–16, 1917–18, 1918–19, 1919–20, 1920–21, 1923–24, 1925–26, 1927–28.)
Central (II)	1968–2002	7 (Note: Blantyre Victoria, Cambuslang Rangers, Baillieston Juniors, Pollok, East Kilbride Thistle, Arthurlie, Renfrew.)	13 (Note: 1968–69, 1969–70, 1970–71, 1971–72, 1973–74, 1979–80, 1980–81, 1981–82, 1982–83, 1984–85, 1996–97, 1997–98, 2000–01.)
Ayrshire	1968–2002	7 (Note: Irvine Meadow, Kilbirnie Ladeside, Cumnock Juniors, Auchinleck Talbot, Glenafton Athletic, Largs Thistle, Kilwinning Rangers.)	12 (Note: 1972–73, 1976–77, 1978–79, 1985–86, 1986–87, 1987–88, 1988–89, 1990–91, 1991–92, 1992–93, 1993–94, 1998–99.)
West Region	2002–2020	5 (Note: Auchinleck Talbot, Shotts Bon Accord, Hurlford United, Beith Juniors, Glenafton Athletic.)	11 (Note: 2005–06, 2008–09, 2010–11, 2011–12, 2012–13, 2013–14, 2014–15, 2015–16, 2016–17, 2017–18, 2018–19.)
Edinburgh / Midlothian / East of Scotland	1922–1968	8 (Note: Musselburgh Bruntonians, Newtongrange Star, Tranent, Fauldhouse United, Bo'ness United, Dunbar United, Linlithgow Rose, Bonnyrigg Rose Athletic.)	8 (Note: 1922–23, 1929–30, 1934–35, 1945–46, 1947–48, 1960–61, 1964–65, 1965–66.)
Lanarkshire	1891–1968	4 (Note: Dalziel Rovers, Burnbank Athletic, Larkhall Thistle, Shotts Bon Accord.)	7 (Note: 1897–98, 1900–01, 1907–08, 1910–11, 1913–14, 1944–45, 1957–58.)
Irvine & District / Western	1907–1968	5 (Note: Kilwinning Rangers, Saltcoats Victoria, Auchinleck Talbot, Kilbirnie Ladeside, Irvine Meadow.)	6 (Note: 1908–09, 1924–25, 1948–49, 1951–52, 1958–59, 1962–63.)
East	1968–2002	5 (Note: Bo'ness United, Bonnyrigg Rose Athletic, Camelon Juniors, Whitburn, Linlithgow Rose.)	6 (Note: 1975–76, 1977–78, 1983–84, 1994–95, 1999–2000, 2001–02.)
East Region / Midlands	2002–	4 (Note: Tayport, Carnoustie Panmure, Linlithgow Rose, Bathgate Thistle.)	6 (Note: 2002–03, 2003–04, 2004–05, 2006–07, 2007–08, 2009–10.)
Scottish	1892–1947	5 (Note: Vale of Clyde, St Mirren Juniors, St Roch's, Maryhill Hibs, Denny Hibs.)	5 (Note: 1892–93, 1916–17, 1921–22, 1927–28, 1930–31.)
Fife	1921–2002	4 (Note: Inverkeithing United, St Andrews United, Glenrothes, Hill of Beath Hawthorn.)	4 (Note: 1912–13, 1959–60, 1974–75, 1989–90.)
West of Scotland	2021–	4 (Note: Auchinleck Talbot, Cumnock, Darvel, Johnstone Burgh.)	5 (Note: 2021–2022, 2022–2023, 2023–2024, 2024–2025, 2025–2026.)
Aberdeen & District (Note: No clubs from the North regional league formed in 1968, or from its successor, the North Region formed in 2001, has won the Scottish Cup or reached the final.)	1901–1968	2 (Note: Sunnybank, Banks o' Dee.)	2 (Note: 1953–54, 1956–57.)
Dundee / Midland	1894–1969	1 (Note: Dundee Violet.)	1 (Note: 1928–29.)
Tayside	1969–2002	1 (Note: Tayport.)	1 (Note: 1995–96.)
Stirlingshire	1893–1927	1 (Note: Dunipace.)	1 (Note: 1905–06.)
