= William McLaughlin =

William McLaughlin may refer to:

- Bill McLaughlin Australian rugby union player
- Billy McLaughlin (political strategist), American political strategist
- Billy McLaughlin, American musician
- Willie McLaughlin (1878–1946), Scottish footballer
- William McLaughlin (baseball) (1861–1936), Major League Baseball shortstop
- William McLaughlin (politician) (born 1932), American politician from Michigan
- William I. McLaughlin (born 1935), retired American space scientist
- W. Earle McLaughlin (1915–1991), Canadian banker
