= Whitehouse.gov =

Official website of the White House

whitehouse.gov
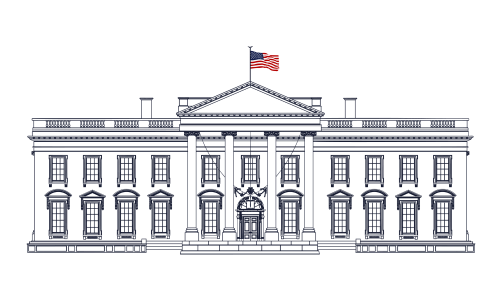
- Website type: US government
- Available in: English; Spanish (archives only) (Note: As of the second Trump administration, a Spanish version is not available and it was also not available in the previous archived version of the website during the first Trump administration. Archived Spanish versions of the website under the Biden, Obama, and Bush administrations remain available.)
- Owner: Federal government of the United States
- Website: whitehouse.gov; wh.gov (redirect link)
- Commercial: No
- Launched: July 29, 1994; 32 years ago
- Current status: Active
- Written in: WordPress

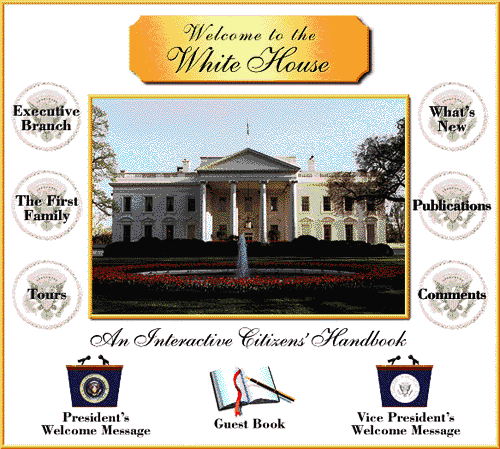
The website during the presidency of Bill Clinton in 1995

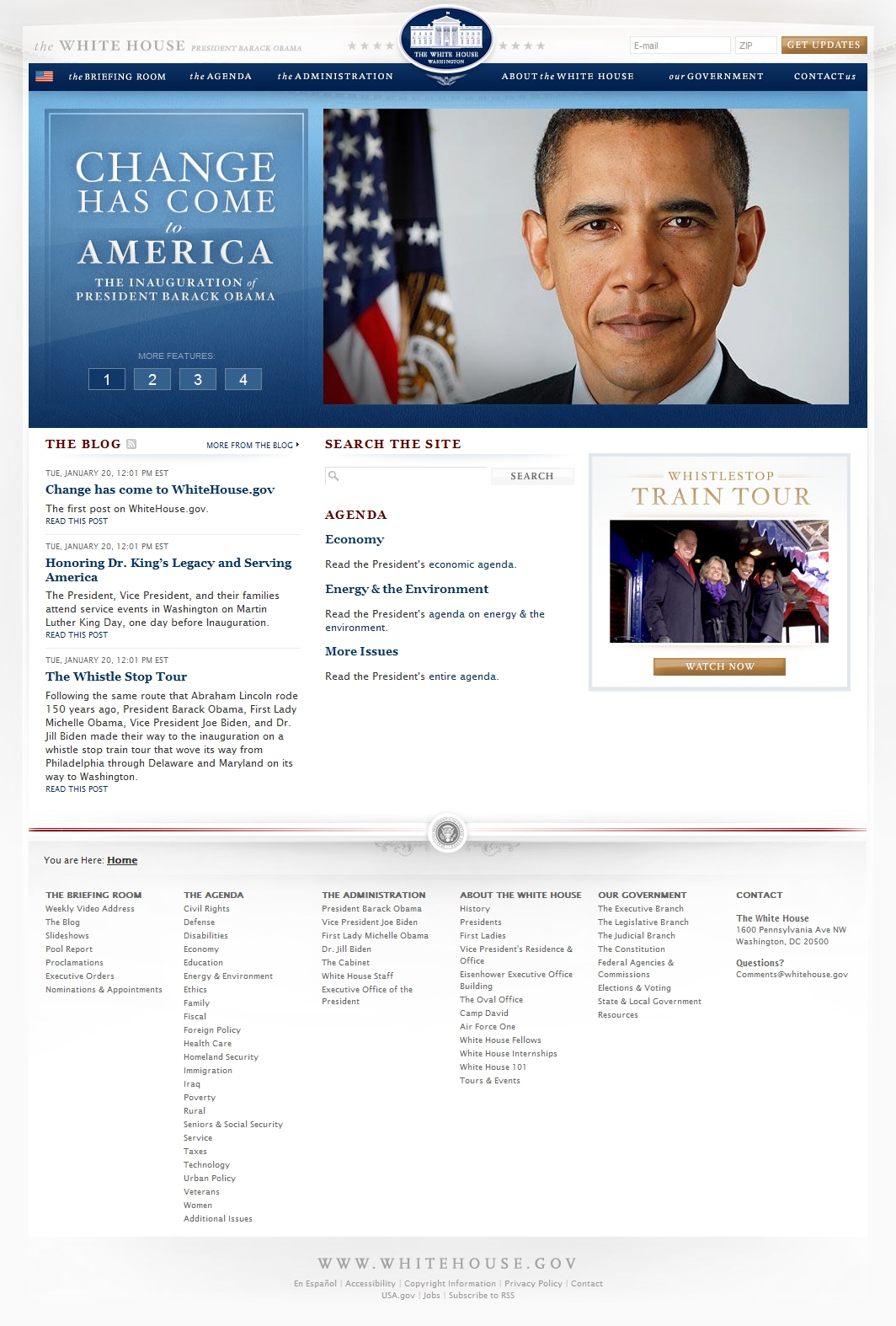
The website following the first inauguration of Barack Obama in 2009

whitehouse.gov or wh.gov is the official website of the White House and is managed by the Office of Digital Strategy of the White House Office under the Executive Office of the President of the United States. It was launched in 1994 by the Clinton administration. The content of the website is in the public domain or licensed under Creative Commons Attribution license.

== Content ==
The content of the White House website is designed to be an open portfolio for the public to know the current operations of the president during their presidency. The website contains information about the president, the vice president, their families, press releases, proclamations, executive orders, and a transcript of speeches by White House officials, though in May 2025, Donald Trump had nearly all of his transcripts from his second presidency removed and replaced by limited video footage after it was revealed that only 20% had been posted.

The website also provides information about the current issues the president and vice president address (like education, healthcare, etc.), also providing information about the history of the White House building, Air Force One, and Camp David. The website also reviews the structure of the Federal Government of the United States, including details about state and local government, along with voting and elections.

The website also offers information about getting involved with the White House. This includes directions on how to write or call the White House, as well as details about the White House Internship Program and the White House Fellows Program.

The site also contains information about the current Cabinet of the United States and the Executive Office of the President of the United States.

=== Site differences in each administration ===
After a new administration is sworn in on Inauguration Day, the website is immediately redesigned for the new administration. Past administration websites are archived by the National Archives.

=== Civic engagement ===
On September 1, 2011, David Plouffe, Senior Advisor to the President of the United States to Barack Obama, announced in an email that the White House was releasing "We the People", an online platform for the public to create petitions to the US Government. The launch of the petitioning platform was announced by Katelyn Sabochik on September 22, 2011, in a White House blog post.

On December 19, 2017, the Trump administration announced its intention to temporarily shut down the platform and replace it with a "new platform [that] would save taxpayers more than $1m a year", though ultimately it was retained in its initial form. On January 20, 2021, the day of the inauguration of Joe Biden, the platform started redirecting to the main whitehouse.gov domain, marking the discontinuance of the feature by the incoming administration. It has not been relaunched since.

== Platform ==
In July 2001, the White House started switching their web servers to an operating system based on Red Hat Linux and using the Apache HTTP Server. The installation was completed in February 2009. In October 2009, the White House web servers adopted Drupal, a free and open-source content management system, which runs on Red Hat Enterprise Linux.

In December 2017, the first Trump administration launched a redesigned website developed using WordPress which it claimed would save taxpayers "almost $3 million per year".

In March 2026, the second Trump administration launched an official White House mobile app following a cryptic marketing campaign on social media. The app features access to White House livestreams and real-time updates, a news tab with White House press releases, a social media tab showing the White House social media posts on a number of platforms, and a photo gallery. The app also includes a tipline for ICE and options to sign up for a newsletter and to contact the White House.

== See also ==
- whitehouse.com, a former adult website
- whitehouse.org, a parody website
- List of websites founded before 1995
- White House, the building
- White House Wire, government-controlled news aggregator website
