= List of presidential memoranda by Barack Obama =

United States presidents issue presidential memoranda, which are similar to executive orders and have the force of law on the Executive Branch, but are generally considered less prestigious. Presidential memoranda do not have an established process for issuance or publication; unlike executive orders, they are not numbered.

== List ==
No.	Title/Description	Date signed
1	Pay Freeze	January 21, 2009
2	Freedom of Information Act	January 21, 2009
3	Transparency and Open Government	January 21, 2009
4	Memorandum -- Transparency and Open Government	January 21, 2009
5	Review of the Detention of Ali Saleh Kahlah	January 22, 2009
6	Mexico City Policy and Assistance for Voluntary Population Planning	January 23, 2009
7	The Energy Independence and Security Act of 2007	January 26, 2009
8	California Request for Waiver Under the Clean Air Act	January 26, 2009
9	Presidential Memorandum -- EPA Waiver	January 26, 2009
10	Presidential Memorandum -- Fuel Economy	January 26, 2009
11	Unexpected Urgent Refugee and Migration Needs Related to Gaza	January 27, 2009
12	Memorandum for the Heads of Executive Departments and Agencies	January 30, 2009
13	Presidential Memorandum -- State Children's Health Insurance Program	February 4, 2009
14	Appliance Efficiency Standards	February 5, 2009
15	Transfer of Detainee to Control of the Attorney General	February 27, 2009
16	Memorandum for the Heads of Executive Departments and Agencies	March 3, 2009
17	Memorandum for the Heads of Executive Departments and Agencies - Subject: Government Contracting	March 4, 2009
18	Message to Congress from the President Regarding Export Certification	March 4, 2009
19	Memorandum for the Heads of Executive Departments and Agencies 3-9-09	March 9, 2009
20	Memorandum on Presidential Signing Statements	March 9, 2009
21	Unexpected Urgent Refugee and Migration Needs Related to the Continuing Conflict in Pakistan	March 11, 2009
22	Memorandum for the Heads of Executive Departments and Agencies, 3/20/09	March 20, 2009
23	Presidential Memorandum Regarding Deferred Enforced Departure for Liberians	March 23, 2009
24	Memorandum: Promoting Democracy and Human Rights in Cuba	April 13, 2009
25	Message to Congress from the President	April 21, 2009
26	Presidential Memorandum Regarding Regulatory Review	April 23, 2009
27	Presidential Memorandum for the Secretary of Defense	April 27, 2009
28	Presidential Memorandum for the Secretary of State, 4-30-09	April 30, 2009
29	Presidential Memorandum Regarding The United States Peru Trade Promotion Agreement Implementation Act	May 1, 2009
30	Memorandum from the President for the Chair of the Council on Environmental Quality	May 15, 2009
31	Presidential Memorandum Regarding Preemption	May 20, 2009
32	Presidential Memorandum Regarding Nuclear Agreement with the United Arab Emirates	May 20, 2009
33	Presidential Memorandum-Classified Information and Controlled Unclassified Information	May 27, 2009
34	Presidential Memorandum on the Embassy in Jerusalem	June 5, 2009
35	Memorandum from the President to the Secretary of State, 6-9-09	June 9, 2009
36	Memorandums from the President regarding Cambodia and Laos	June 12, 2009
37	Memorandum for the Heads of Executive Departments and Agencies on Federal Benefits and Non-Discrimination, 6-17-09	June 17, 2009
38	FACT SHEET: Memorandum of Understanding on Cooperation in the Field of Public Health and Medical Sciences	July 6, 2009
39	Memorandum from the President to the Secretary of State Concerning the Palestinian Authority	July 8, 2009
40	Memorandum from the President Assigning Certain Reporting Functions Under the Supplemental Appropriations Act	July 17, 2009
41	Memorandum from the President for the Heads of Executive Departments and Agencies Regarding Guidelines for Human Stem Cell Research	July 30, 2009
42	Memorandum from the President on the Office of Science and Technology Policy	August 5, 2009
43	Memorandum from the President to the Secretary of Homeland Security	August 6, 2009
44	Presidential Memorandum regarding drug interdiction assistance to Colombia	August 13, 2009
45	Memorandum from the President to the Secretary of Transportation	August 21, 2009
46	Presidential Memorandum-International Boundary and Water Commission Designations	August 31, 2009
47	Presidential Determination of Assistance to the Economic Community of Central African States	September 8, 2009
48	Presidential Determination of Assistance to the Maldives	September 8, 2009
49	Memorandum For The Secretary Of Commerce The Secretary Of Labor The United States Trade Representative	September 11, 2009
50	Memorandum from the President regarding the Trading With the Enemy Act	September 14, 2009
51	Presidential Determination regarding trafficking in persons	September 15, 2009
52	Presidential Memorandum Concerning Medical Liability Reform	September 17, 2009
53	Presidential Determination regarding major illicit drug transit	September 18, 2009
54	Presidential Memorandum Concerning National Security	September 21, 2009
55	Presidential Memorandum to the Secretary of Commerce	September 29, 2009
56	Presidential Memoranda, 9/30/09	September 30, 2009
57	Presidential Memorandum to the Secretary of State	October 8, 2009
58	Presidential Memorandum Brazil Assistance	October 16, 2009
59	Presidential Memorandum on Tribal Consultation	November 5, 2009
60	Presidential Memorandum on Inventory of Files Related to Fort Hood Shooting	November 12, 2009
61	Presidential Memorandum-- Assignment of Functions Under the National Defense	November 30, 2009
62	Presidential Memorandum - Suspension of Limitations Under the Jerusalem Embassy Act	December 3, 2009
63	Presidential Memorandum - Community Health Centers	December 9, 2009
64	Presidential Memorandum - Eleventh Quadrennial Review of Military Compensation	December 11, 2009
65	"Presidential Memorandum-Closure of Dentention [sic] Facilities at the Guantanamo Bay Naval Base". whitehouse.gov. 15 December 2009. Archived from the original on 4 February 2017 – via National Archives.	December 15, 2009
66	Presidential Memorandum - Implementation of the Executive Order, "Classified National Security Information"	December 29, 2009
67	Presidential Memorandum - Aviation Screening	December 29, 2009
68	Presidential Memorandum - Watchlisting Procedures	December 29, 2009
69	Memorandum of Disapproval	December 30, 2009
70	Presidential Memorandum Regarding 12/25/2009 Attempted Terrorist Attack	January 7, 2010
71	Memorandum for the Heads of Executive Departments and Agencies	January 20, 2010
72	Presidential Memorandum -- Blue Ribbon Commission on America's Nuclear Future	January 29, 2010
73	Presidential Memorandum -- A Comprehensive Federal Strategy on Carbon Capture and Storage	February 3, 2010
74	Presidential Memorandum Regarding India	February 3, 2010
75	Presidential Memorandum -- Establishing a Task Force on Childhood Obesity	February 9, 2010
76	Presidential Memorandum Regarding Finding and Recapturing Improper Payments	March 10, 2010
77	Presidential Memorandum - US-India Nuclear Cooperation Approval and Nonproliferation Enhancement Act	March 10, 2010
78	Presidential Memorandum-- Deferred Enforced Departure for Liberians	March 19, 2010
79	Presidential Memorandum--United States Outer Continental Shelf	March 31, 2010
80	Presidential Memorandum-Delegation of a Reporting Authority	April 7, 2010
81	Presidential Determination - Waiver of and Certification of Statutory Provisions Regarding the Palestine Liberation Organization Office	April 7, 2010
82	Presidential Determination - Waiver of Restriction on Providing Funds to the Palestinian Authority	April 7, 2010
83	Presidential Memorandum - Hospital Visitation	April 15, 2010
84	Presidential Memorandum -- America's Great Outdoors	April 16, 2010
85	Presidential Proclamation- National Day of Service and Remembrance for Victims and Survivors of Terrorism	April 16, 2010
86	Presidential Memorandum -- National Defense Authorization Act	April 22, 2010
87	Presidential Memorandum on the Interagency Task Force on Federal Contracting Opportunities for Small Businesses	April 26, 2010
88	Presidential Memorandums -- National Defense Authorization Act	April 28, 2010
89	Presidential Memorandums--United States-India Peaceful Atomic Energy Cooperation Act	April 28, 2010
90	Presidential Memoranda-- Task Force on Space Industry WorkForce and Economic Development	May 3, 2010
91	Presidential Memorandum - United States-India Nuclear Cooperation Approval and Nonproliferation Enhancement Act	May 4, 2010
92	Presidential Memorandum--- Concerning a Nuclear Agreement with Australia.	May 5, 2010
93	Memorandum from the President Regarding a Peaceful Nuclear Agreement with Russia	May 10, 2010
94	Presidential Memorandum -- Improving the Federal Recruitment and Hiring Process	May 11, 2010
95	Presidential Memorandum--Oil Supplemental Package	May 12, 2010
96	Text of a Letter from the President Regarding the National Defense Authorization Act	May 13, 2010
97	Presidential Memorandum Regarding Fuel Efficiency Standards	May 21, 2010
98	Presidential Memorandum Designating the Chairperson of the Defense Production Act Committee	June 1, 2010
99	Presidential Memorandum-Extension of Benefits to Same-Sex Domestic Partners of Federal Employees	June 2, 2010
100	Presidential Memorandum--Suspension of Limitations Under the Jerusalem Embassy Act	June 2, 2010
101	Presidential Memorandum--Delegation of Authority to Appoint Commissioned Officers of the Ready Reserve Corps of the Public Health Service	June 2, 2010
102	Presidential Memorandum--Unexpected Urgent Refugee and Migration Needs Related to Somalia and Food Pipeline Breaks for Refugee and Other Displaced Populations of Concern Globally	June 9, 2010
103	Presidential Memorandum--Disposing of Unneeded Federal Real Estate	June 10, 2010
104	Presidential Memorandum--Enhancing Payment Accuracy Through a "Do Not Pay List"	June 18, 2010
105	Presidential Memorandum--Lobbyists on Agency Boards and Commissions	June 18, 2010
106	Memorandum from the President to the Secretary of Health and Human Services Regarding H.R. 3962	June 25, 2010
107	Presidential Memorandum: Unleashing the Wireless Broadband Revolution	June 28, 2010
108	Memorandum from the President on the Long-Term Gulf Coast Restoration Support Plan	June 30, 2010
109	Presidential Memorandum--Implementation of the National HIV/AIDS Strategy	July 13, 2010
110	Presidential Memorandum--The Presidential POWER Initiative: Protecting Our Workers and Ensuring Reemployment	July 19, 2010
111	Presidential Memorandum -- Delegation of Certain Functions and Authorities	July 21, 2010
112	Presidential Memorandum--Delegation of Certain Functions Under Section 3134 of the National Defense Authorization Act	July 21, 2010
113	Presidential Memorandum--Delegation of Certain Functions Under Section 1264 of the Victims of Iranian Censorship Act	July 21, 2010
114	Presidential Memorandum--Arctic Research and Policy Act	July 22, 2010
115	Presidential Memorandum--Freeze Discretionary Awards, Bonuses and Similar Payments	August 3, 2010
116	Presidential Memorandum--Continuation of U.S. Drug Interdiction Assistance to the Government of Columbia	August 12, 2010
117	Presidential Memorandum--Designation of Officials to Act as Director of the Court Services and Offender Supervision Agency	August 17, 2010
118	Letter from the President -- Blocking Property of Certain Persons with Respect to North Korea	August 30, 2010
119	Presidential Memorandum-Continuation of Authorities Under the Trading With the Enemy Act	September 2, 2010
120	Presidential Memorandum-- Unexpected Urgent Refugee and Migration Needs Resulting from Flooding in Pakistan	September 3, 2010
121	Presidential Memorandum--Trafficking in Persons	September 13, 2010
122	Presidential Memorandum--Accountable Government Initiative	September 14, 2010
123	Presidential Memorandum--Major Illicit Drug Transit or Major Illicit Drug Producing Countries	September 16, 2010
124	Presidential Memorandum--Trafficking Victims Protection Reauthorization Act Delegation of Authority	September 20, 2010
125	Presidential Memorandum--Iran Sanctions Act	September 23, 2010
126	Presidential Memorandum--Aviation Insurance Coverage	September 29, 2010
127	Presidential Memorandum--Task Force on Skills for America's Future	October 4, 2010
128	Presidential Memorandum--Providing Funds to the Palestinian Authority	October 7, 2010
129	Presidential Memorandum--H.R. 3808	October 8, 2010
130	Presidential Memorandum--Refugee Admissions	October 8, 2010
131	Presidential Memorandum--U.S. Drug Interdiction Assistance to Brazil	October 15, 2010
132	Presidential Memorandum--Child Soldiers Prevention Act	October 25, 2010
133	Message from the President to the Senate on the Bilateral Tax Agreement with Luxembourg	November 15, 2010
134	Message from the President to the Senate on the Bilateral Tax Agreement with Hungary	November 15, 2010
135	Presidential Memorandum--Sudan	November 19, 2010
136	Presidential Memorandum--Review of Human Subjects Protection	November 24, 2010
137	Presidential Memorandum--Jerusalem Embassy Act	December 3, 2010
138	Presidential Memorandum--Delegation of Certain Functions and Authorities	December 20, 2010
139	Memorandum -- Adjustments of Certain Rates of Pay	December 22, 2010
140	Presidential Memorandum -- Disestablishment of United States Joint Forces Command	January 6, 2011
141	Memorandum from the President regarding the Richard C. Holbrooke Award for Diplomacy	January 14, 2011
142	Presidential Memoranda - Regulatory Compliance	January 18, 2011
143	Presidential Memoranda - Regulatory Flexibility, Small Business, and Job Creation	January 18, 2011
144	Presidential Memorandum--National Defense Authorization Act	February 7, 2011
145	Presidential Memorandum -- Delegation of Reporting and Other Authorities	February 14, 2011
146	Presidential Memorandum--Administrative Flexibility	February 28, 2011
147	Presidential Memorandum -- Enhanced Collection of Relevant Data and Statistics Relating to Women	March 4, 2011
148	Presidential Memorandum-Unexpected Urgent Refugee and Migration Needs Related to Côte d'Ivoire	March 7, 2011
149	Presidential Memorandum-Unexpected Urgent Refugee and Migration Needs Related to Libya	March 7, 2011
150	Presidential Memorandum--The Designation of Officers of the Office of the Director of National Intelligence to Act as Director of National Intelligence	March 8, 2011
151	Presidential Memorandum--Government Reform for Competitiveness and Innovation	March 11, 2011
152	Letter from the President regarding the commencement of operations in Libya	March 21, 2011
153	Letter from the President regarding a Report on Afghanistan and Pakistan	April 5, 2011
154	Presidential Memorandum--Unified Command Plan 2011	April 6, 2011
155	Presidential Memorandum--Delegation of Functions and Authority under Sections 315 and 325 of Title 32, United States Code	April 14, 2011
156	Presidential Memorandum--Libya	April 26, 2011
157	Text of a Letter--Blocking Property of Senior Officials of the Government of Syria	May 18, 2011
158	Message to the Congress Concerning Further Sanctions on Iran	May 23, 2011
159	Presidential Memorandum--Federal Fleet Performance	May 24, 2011
160	Text of a letter from the President regarding Poland and the Visa Waiver Program	May 28, 2011
161	Presidential Memorandum--Delegation of Authority to Appoint Commissioned Officers of the Ready Reserve Crops of the Public Health Service	May 31, 2011
162	Presidential Memorandum--Jerusalem Embassy Act	June 3, 2011
163	Presidential Memorandum--Overseas Private Investment Corporation	June 6, 2011
164	Presidential Memorandum--Unexpected Urgent Refugee and Migration Needs Related to Libya and Côte d'Ivoire	June 9, 2011
165	Memorandum--Regulation and Independent Regulatory Agencies	July 11, 2011
166	Letter from the President Regarding the Cuban Liberty and Democratic Solidarity Act of 1996	July 15, 2011
167	Presidential Memorandum--Ike Skelton National Defense Authorization Act	July 19, 2011
168	Presidential Memorandum--Blocking Property of Transnational Criminal Organizations	July 25, 2011
169	Presidential Study Directive on Mass Atrocities	August 4, 2011
170	Memorandum from the President Regarding the Unexpected Urgent Refugee and Migration Needs Related to the Horn of Africa	August 8, 2011
171	Memorandum from the President regarding the Continuation of U.S. Drug Interdiction Assistance to the Government of Colombia	August 10, 2011
172	Memorandum from the President Regarding Deferred Enforced Departure for Liberians	August 16, 2011
173	Presidential Memorandum--Blocking Property of the Government of Syria and Prohibiting Certain Transactions with Respect to Syria	August 18, 2011
174	Letter from the President to the Speaker of the House of Representatives	August 30, 2011
175	Presidential Memorandum--Waiver of Restriction on Providing Funds to the Palestinian Authority	August 30, 2011
176	Presidential Memorandum--Speeding Infrastructure Development through More Efficient and Effective Permitting and Environmental Review	August 31, 2011
177	Message from the President Regarding the Continuation of the National Emergency with Respect to Certain Terrorist Attacks	September 9, 2011
178	Notice from the President Regarding the Continuation of the National Emergency with Respect to Certain Terrorist Attacks	September 9, 2011
179	Presidential Memorandum regarding Special Agent Samuel Hicks Families of Fallen Heroes Act	September 12, 2011
180	Presidential Memorandum--American Jobs Act of 2011	September 12, 2011
181	Memorandum from the President regarding the revisions to the Unified Command Plan 2011	September 12, 2011
182	Presidential Memorandum--Trading With the Enemy Act	September 13, 2011
183	Message from the President to Congress	September 15, 2011
184	Memorandum Regarding Pelly Certification and Icelandic Whaling	September 15, 2011
185	Presidential Memorandum--Major Illicit Drug Transit	September 15, 2011
186	Presidential Memorandum--President's Plan for Economic Growth and Deficit Reduction	September 19, 2011
187	Notice regarding the Continuation of the National Emergency with Respect to Persons Who Commit, Threaten to Commit, or Support Terrorism	September 21, 2011
188	Message from the President to Congress regarding the Continuation of the National Emergency with Respect to Persons Who Commit, Threaten to Commit, or Support Terrorism	September 21, 2011
189	Memorandum from the President Regarding the Provision of Aviation Insurance Coverage for Commercial Air Carrier Service in Domestic and International Operations	September 28, 2011
190	Presidential Memorandum--Fiscal Year 2012 Refugee Admissions Numbers and Authorizations of In-Country Refugee Status	September 30, 2011
191	Presidential Memorandum--Trafficking in Persons	September 30, 2011
192	Letter from the President regarding a Report on Afghanistan and Pakistan	September 30, 2011
193	Messages from the President to Congress Regarding Trade Agreements--U.S.-Korea	October 3, 2011
194	Messages from the President to Congress Regarding Trade Agreements--U.S.-Korea	October 3, 2011
195	Messages from the President to Congress Regarding Trade Agreements--U.S.-Panama	October 3, 2011
196	Messages from the President to Congress Regarding Trade Agreements--U.S.-Colombia	October 3, 2011
197	Presidential Memorandum -- Child Soldiers Prevention Act of 2008	October 4, 2011
198	Presidential Memorandum -- Provision of U.S. Drug Interdiction Assistance to the Government of Brazil	October 14, 2011
199	Letter from the President to the Speaker of the House of Representatives and the President Pro Tempore of the Senate Regarding the Lord's Resistance Army	October 14, 2011
200	Notice Regarding the Continuation of the National Emergency with Respect to Significant Narcotics Traffickers Centered in Colombia	October 19, 2011
201	Message Regarding the Continuation of the National Emergency with Respect to Significant Narcotics Traffickers Centered in Colombia	October 19, 2011
202	Message -- Continuation of the National Emergency with Respect to the Situation in or in Relation to the Democratic Republic of the Congo	October 25, 2011
203	Notice -- Continuation of the National Emergency with Respect to the Situation in or in Relation to the Democratic Republic of the Congo	October 25, 2011
204	Presidential Memorandum -- Accelerating Technology Transfer and Commercialization of Federal Research in Support of High-Growth Businesses	October 28, 2011
205	Presidential Memorandum -- Making it Easier for America's Small Businesses and America's Exporters to Access Government Services to Help Them Grow and Hire	October 28, 2011
206	Message -- Continuation of the National Emergency with Respect to Sudan	November 1, 2011
207	Notice -- Continuation of the National Emergency with Respect to Sudan	November 1, 2011
208	Presidential Memorandum -- New START Treaty	November 2, 2011
209	Notice -- Continuation of the National Emergency with Respect to Iran	November 7, 2011
210	Message -- Continuation of the National Emergency with Respect to Iran	November 7, 2011
211	Notice -- Continuation of the National Emergency with Respect to Weapons of Mass Destruction	November 9, 2011
212	Message -- Continuation of the National Emergency with Respect to Weapons of Mass Destruction	November 9, 2011
213	Message from the President to the Senate -- Agreement on Port State Measures to Prevent, Deter, and Eliminate Illegal, Unreported, and Unregulated Fishing	November 14, 2011
214	Message from the President to Congress -- Naval Petroleum Reserves	November 17, 2011
215	Presidential Memorandum -- Managing Government Records	November 28, 2011
216	We Can't Wait: President Signs Memorandum to Modernize Management of Government Records	November 28, 2011
217	Presidential Memorandum -- Implementation of Energy Savings Projects and Performance-Based Contracting for Energy Savings	December 2, 2011
218	Presidential Memorandum -- Suspension of Limitations under the Jerusalem Embassy Act	December 2, 2011
219	Presidential Memorandum -- International Initiatives to Advance the Human Rights of Lesbian, Gay, Bisexual, and Transgender Persons	December 6, 2011
220	Presidential Memorandum -- Determinations under Section 1106(a) of the Omnibus Trade and Competitiveness Act of 1988 - Russian Federation	December 15, 2011
221	Letter from the President to the Speaker of the House of Representatives and the President Pro Tempore of the Senate Regarding the War Powers Resolution	December 15, 2011
222	Presidential Memorandum -- Flexible Implementation of the Mercury and Air Toxics Standards Rule	December 21, 2011
223	Statement by the President on H.R. 2055	December 23, 2011
224	Letter from the President to the Speaker of the House of Representatives and the President of the Senate regarding the Consolidated Appropriations Act, 2012	December 23, 2011
225	Presidential Memorandum -- Delegation of a Certain Function and Authority Conferred upon the President by Section 1235(c) of the Ike Skelton National Defense Authorization Act for Fiscal Year 2011	January 5, 2012
226	Presidential Memorandum--Presidential Determination on the Eligibility of South Sudan to Receive Defense Articles and Defense Services	January 6, 2012
227	Presidential Memorandum -- Certification Concerning U.S. Participation in the United Nations Mission in South Sudan Consistent with Section 2005 of the American Servicemembers' Protection Act	January 10, 2012
228	Letter from the President Regarding the Cuban Liberty and Democratic Solidarity (LIBERTAD) Act of 1996	January 13, 2012
229	President Obama Announces Presidential Delegation to Monrovia, Liberia to attend the Inauguration of Her Excellency Ellen Johnson Sirleaf	January 13, 2012
230	Presidential Memorandum -- Implementing Provisions of the Temporary Payroll Tax Cut Continuation Act of 2011 Relating to the Keystone XL Pipeline Permit	January 18, 2012
231	Letter -- Continuation of the National Emergency with Respect to Terrorists who Threaten to Disrupt the Middle East Peace Process	January 19, 2012
232	Notice -- Continuation of the National Emergency with Respect to Terrorists who Threaten to Disrupt the Middle East Peace Process	January 19, 2012
233	Presidential Memorandum -- Federal Support for the Randolph-Sheppard Vending Facility Program	January 20, 2012
234	Presidential Memorandum--Delegation of Certain Function under Section 308(a) of the Intelligence Authorization Act for Fiscal Year 2012	January 27, 2012
235	Presidential Memorandum -- Delegation of Authority in Accordance with Sections 610 and 652 of the Foreign Assistance Act of 1961	January 30, 2012
236	Presidential Memorandum -- Delegation of Authority Pursuant to Sections 110(d)(4) and 110(f) of the Trafficking Victims Protection Act of 2000, as Amended	February 3, 2012
237	Presidential Memorandum -- Maximizing the Effectiveness of Federal Programs and Functions Supporting Trade and Investment	February 17, 2012
238	Presidential Memorandum -- Driving Innovation and Creating Jobs in Rural America through Biobased and Sustainable Product Procurement	February 21, 2012
239	Letter -- Continuation of the National Emergency with Respect to Cuba and the Emergency Authority Relating to the Regulation of the Anchorage and Movement of vessels	February 23, 2012
240	Notice -- Continuation of the National Emergency with Respect to Cuba and the Emergency Authority Relating to the Regulation of the Anchorage and Movement of vessels	February 23, 2012
241	Notice -- Continuation of the National Emergency with Respect to Libya	February 23, 2012
242	Letter -- Continuation of the National Emergency with Respect to Libya	February 23, 2012
243	Presidential Memorandum -- Delegation of Reporting Function Specified in Section 1043 of the National Defense Authorization Act for Fiscal Year 2012	February 27, 2012
244	Presidential Memorandum -- Proposed Revised Habitat for the Spotted Owl: Minimizing Regulatory Burdens	February 28, 2012
245	Presidential Memorandum to Congress -- Requirements of the National Defense Authorization Act	February 28, 2012
246	Presidential Message to Congress -- Requirements of the National Defense Authorization Act	February 28, 2012
247	Presidential Policy Directive -- Requirements of the National Defense Authorization Act	February 28, 2012
248	Presidential Memorandum -- Treaty Between the Government of the United States of America and the Government of the United Kingdom of Great Britain and Northern Ireland Concerning Defense Trade Cooperation	March 6, 2012
249	Presidential Memorandum -- Delegation of Reporting Functions Specified in Section 1045 of the National Defense Authorization Act for Fiscal Year 2012	March 16, 2012
250	Letter from the President Regarding High Performance Computer Export Controls	March 16, 2012
251	Presidential Memorandum -- Expediting Review of Pipeline Projects from Cushing, Oklahoma, to Port Arthur, Texas, and Other Domestic Pipeline Infrastructure Projects	March 22, 2012
252	Presidential Memoranda -- Trade Act of 1974 Argentina	March 26, 2012
253	Presidential Memoranda -- Trade Act of 1974 South Sudan	March 26, 2012
254	Presidential Memorandum -- Establishing a Working Group on the Intersection of HIV/AIDS, Violence Against Women and Girls, and Gender-related Health Disparities	March 30, 2012
255	Presidential Memorandum -- Presidential Determination Pursuant to Section 1245(d)(4)(B) and (C) of the National Defense Authorization Act for Fiscal Year 2012	March 30, 2012
256	Presidential Memorandum -- Unexpected Urgent Refugee and Migration Needs	April 3, 2012
257	Presidential Memorandum -- Establishing Policies for Addressing Domestic Violence in the Federal Workforce	April 18, 2012
258	Presidential Memorandum -- Delegation of Reporting Functions Specified in Section 1235(c) of the National Defense Authorization Act for Fiscal Year 2012	April 20, 2012
259	Presidential Memorandum -- Delegation of Reporting Functions Specified in Section 8 of the Belarus Democracy Act of 2004, as Amended	April 24, 2012
260	Presidential Memorandum -- Waiver of Restriction on Providing Funds to the Palestinian Authority	April 25, 2012
261	Message -- Continuation of the National Emergency with Respect to Burma	May 17, 2012
262	Notice -- Continuation of the National Emergency with Respect to Burma	May 17, 2012
263	Presidential Memorandum -- Implementing the Prison Rape Elimination Act	May 17, 2012
264	Message from the President to the Senate Regarding a Tax Treaty with Chile	May 17, 2012
265	Presidential Memorandum -- Designation of Officers of the Office of Personnel Management to Act as Director of the Office of Personnel Management	May 21, 2012
266	Presidential Memorandum -- Designation of Officers of the National Archives and Records Administration to Act as Archivist of the United States	May 21, 2012
267	Presidential Memorandum -- Designation of Officers of the Millennium Challenge Corporation to Act as Chief Executive Officer of the Millennium Challenge Corporation	May 21, 2012
268	Presidential Memorandum -- Building a 21st Century Digital Government	May 23, 2012
269	Letter from the President Regarding Sanctions on Foreign Narcotics Kingpins	June 1, 2012
270	Presidential Memorandum -- Suspension of Limitations Under the Jerusalem Embassy Act	June 1, 2012
271	Presidential Memorandum--Improving Repayment Options for Federal Student Loan Borrowers	June 7, 2012
272	Presidential Memorandum--Presidential Determination Pursuant to Section 1245(d)(4)(B) and (C) of the National Defense Authorization Act for Fiscal Year 2012	June 11, 2012
273	Presidential Memorandum -- Delegation of Authority, Child Soldiers Prevention Act of 2008	June 14, 2012
274	Notice--Continuation of the National Emergency with Respect to the Western Balkans	June 22, 2012
275	Letter--Continuation of the National Emergency with Respect to the Western Balkans	June 22, 2012
276	Presidential Memorandum--Presidential Determination on a U.S. Export-Import Bank Transaction with Vietnam	June 25, 2012
277	Letter--Russian Highly Enriched Uranium	June 25, 2012
278	Letter--Designation of the Chair of the United States International Trade Commission	June 25, 2012
279	Presidential Memorandum -- Designation of the Islamic Republic of Afghanistan as a Major Non-NATO A	July 6, 2012
280	Presidential Memorandum -- Delegation of Certain Functions under Section 570(e) of the Foreign Operations, Export Financing, and Related Programs Appropriations Act, 1997	July 11, 2012
281	Presidential Memorandum -- Unexpected Urgent Refugee and Migration Needs With Respect to Mali	July 12, 2012
282	Presidential Memorandum -- Uniformed Services Employment and Reemployment Rights Act (USERRA)	July 19, 2012
283	Fact Sheet: Presidential Memorandum Supporting Veterans’ Employment and Reemployment Across the Federal Workforce	July 19, 2012
284	Presidential Memorandum -- Continuation of U.S. Drug Interdiction Assistance to the Government of Colombia	August 10, 2012
285	Letter from the President Regarding An Alternative Plan for Pay Increases for Civilian Federal Employees	August 21, 2012
286	Presidential Memorandum -- Delegation of Certain Functions and Authority under Section 5(a) of the Tom Lantos Block Burmese Junta's Anti-Democratic Efforts Act of 2008	August 29, 2012
287	Presidential Memorandum -- Presidential Determination on Trading With the Enemy Act	September 10, 2012
288	Notice -- Continuation of the National Emergency with Respect to Certain Terrorist Attacks	September 11, 2012
289	Message -- Continuation of the National Emergency with Respect to Certain Terrorist Attacks	September 11, 2012
290	Notice -- Continuation of the National Emergency with Respect to Persons Who Commit, Threaten to Commit, or Support Terrorism	September 11, 2012
291	Message -- Continuation of the National Emergency with Respect to Persons Who Commit, Threaten to Commit, or Support Terrorism	September 11, 2012
292	Presidential Memorandum -- Presidential Determination on the annual Presidential Determination on Major Illicit Drug Transit and Drug Producing Countries	September 14, 2012
293	Presidential Memorandum -- Presidential Determination with Respect to Foreign Governments' Efforts Regarding Trafficking in Persons	September 14, 2012
294	Presidential Memorandum -- Aviation Insurance Coverage for Commercial Air Carrier Service in Domestic and International Operations	September 27, 2012
295	Presidential Memorandum -- Presidential Determination with respect to the Child Soldiers Prevention Act of 2008	September 28, 2012
296	Presidential Memorandum -- Annual Refugee Admissions Numbers	September 28, 2012
297	Presidential Memorandum -- Delegation of Certain Functions and Authorities under the Iran Threat Reduction and Syria Human Rights Act of 2012	October 9, 2012
298	Presidential Memorandum -- Delegation of Functions to the Secretary of State to Support Assistance by International Financial Institutions for Burma	October 10, 2012
299	Presidential Memorandum -- Provision of U.S. Drug Interdiction Assistance to the Government of Brazil	October 11, 2012
300	Presidential Memorandum -- Directing a Transfer of Ultra-Low Sulfur Diesel Oil from the Northeast Home Heating Oil Reserve for Communities Affected by Hurricane Sandy	November 2, 2012
301	Presidential Memorandum -- Emergency Leave Transfer Program for Federal Employees Adversely Affected by Hurricane Sandy	November 9, 2012
302	Presidential Proclamation -- National Child's Day, 2012	November 20, 2012
303	Presidential Proclamation -- Thanksgiving Day, 2012	November 20, 2012
304	Presidential Memorandum -- National Insider Threat Policy and Minimum Standards for Executive Branch Insider Threat Programs	November 21, 2012
305	Presidential Memorandum -- Designation of Authorized Representative of the Federal Government under Section 7302 of the National Intelligence Reform and Terrorism Prevention Act of 2004	November 28, 2012
306	Presidential Memorandum -- Presidential Determination with respect to the Suspension of Limitations under the Jerusalem Embassy Act	December 4, 2012
307	Presidential Memorandum -- Presidential Determination Pursuant to Section 1245 (d) (4) (B) and (C) of the National Defense Authorization Act for Fiscal Year 2012	December 7, 2012
308	Presidential Memorandum -- Federal Employee Pay Schedules and Rates that are Set by Administrative Discretion	December 21, 2012
309	Presidential Memorandum -- Authorized Representative of the Federal Government Under Section 7302 of the National Intelligence Reform and Terrorism Prevention Act of 2004	December 21, 2012
310	Presidential Memorandum -- National Flood Insurance Program	January 7, 2013
311	Letter from the President to the Speaker of the House of Representatives and the President Pro Tempore of the Senate Regarding the War Powers Resolution	January 13, 2013
312	Presidential Memorandum -- Delegation of Certain Functions Under Section 6 of Public Law 112-150	January 15, 2013
313	Presidential Memorandum -- Tracing of Firearms in Connection with Criminal Investigations	January 16, 2013
314	Presidential Memorandum -- Improving Availability of Relevant Executive Branch Records to the National Instant Criminal Background Check System	January 16, 2013
315	Presidential Memorandum -- Engaging in Public Health Research on the Causes and Prevention of Gun Violence	January 16, 2013
316	Presidential Memorandum -- Rulemaking Concerning the Standards for Designating Positions in the Competitive Service as National Security Sensitive and Related Matters	January 25, 2013
317	Presidential Memorandum -- Presidential Determination Regarding the Unexpected Urgent Refugee and Migration Needs Relating to Syria	January 28, 2013
318	Presidential Memorandum -- Coordination of Policies and Programs to Promote Gender Equality and Empower Women and Girls Globally	January 30, 2013
319	Presidential Memorandum -- Delegation of a Reporting Authority	January 31, 2013
320	Presidential Memorandum -- Delegation of Authority to Suspend the Provisions of Title III of the Cuban Liberty and Democratic Solidarity (LIBERTAD) Act of 1996	January 31, 2013
321	Presidential Memorandum -- Designation of Officers of the Pension Benefit Guaranty Corporation to Act as Director of the Pension Benefit Guaranty Corporation	February 1, 2013
322	Presidential Memorandum -- Presidential Determination Regarding Waiver of Restriction on Providing Funds to the Palestinian Authority	February 8, 2013
323	Presidential Memorandum -- Presidential Determination Regarding Drawdown Under Section 506 (a)(1) of the Foreign Assistance Act of 1961, as Amended, for Chad and France to Support Their Efforts in Mali	February 11, 2013
324	Presidential Nominations Sent to the Senate	February 13, 2013
325	Presidential Memorandum - Delegation of Authority to Submit to the Congress Certain Certifications, Reports, and Notifications	February 20, 2013
326	Presidential Memorandum -- Deferred Enforced Departure for Liberians	March 15, 2013
327	Presidential Memorandum - Delegation of Authority to Appoint Commissioned Officers of the Ready Reserve Corps of the Public Health Service	March 29, 2013
328	Presidential Memorandum -- Delegation of Functions Under Sections 404 and 406 of Public Law 112-208	April 5, 2013
329	Presidential Memorandum -- Federal Employee Pay Schedules and Rates that are set by Administrative Discretion	April 5, 2013
330	Presidential Memorandum -- Presidential Determination on Eligibility of the Federal Republic of Somalia to Receive Defense Articles and Defense Services under the Foreign Assistance Act of 1961, as Amended, and the Arms Export Control Act, as Amended	April 8, 2013
331	Presidential Memorandum -- Presidential Determination on Syria Drawdown	April 11, 2013
332	Presidential Memorandum -- Advancing Pay Equality in the Federal Government and Learning from Successful Practices	May 10, 2013
333	Presidential Memorandum -- Modernizing Federal Infrastructure Review and Permitting Regulations, Policies, and Procedures	May 17, 2013
334	Presidential Memorandum -- Delegation of Functions under Subsection 804(h)(2)(A) of the Foreign Narcotics Kingpin Designation Act	May 31, 2013
335	Presidential Memorandum -- Delegation of Certain Functions and Authorities Under the Iran Freedom and Counter-Proliferation Act of 2012	June 3, 2013
336	Presidential Memorandum -- Emergency Leave Transfer Program for Federal Employees Adversely Affected by the Severe Storms and Tornadoes in Oklahoma	June 3, 2013
337	Presidential Memorandum -- Suspension of Limitations Under the Jerusalem Embassy Act	June 4, 2013
338	Presidential Memorandum -- Presidential Determination Pursuant to Section 1245(d)(4)(B) and (C) of the National Defense Authorization Act for Fiscal Year 2012	June 5, 2013
339	Presidential Memorandum -- Transforming our Nation's Electric Grid Through Improved Siting, Permitting, and Review	June 7, 2013
340	Presidential Memorandum -- Expanding America's Leadership in Wireless Innovation	June 14, 2013
341	Presidential Memorandum -- Delegation of Reporting Functions	June 19, 2013
342	Presidential Memorandum -- Power Sector Carbon Pollution Standards	June 25, 2013
343	Presidential Memorandum -- Expanding National Service	July 15, 2013
344	Presidential Memorandum -- Waiver of Restriction on Providing Funds to the Palestinian Authority	July 26, 2013
345	Presidential Memorandum -- Delegation of Authority to Sections 110(d)(4) and 110(f) of the Trafficking Victims Protection Act of 2000, as Amended	July 29, 2013
346	Presidential Memorandum -- Delegation of Authority Pursuant to Section 404(c) of the Child Soldiers Prevention Act of 2008, as Amended	August 2, 2013
347	Presidential Memorandum -- Continuation of U.S. Drug Interdiction Assistance to the Government of Colombia	August 9, 2013
348	Presidential Memorandum -- Reviewing Our Global Signals Intelligence Collection and Communications Technologies	August 12, 2013
349	Presidential Determination -- Major Drug Transit and Drug Producing Countries for FY 2014	September 13, 2013
350	Presidential Memorandum -- Presidential Determination on Traficking [sic] in Persons	September 17, 2013
351	Presidential Memorandum -- Designation of Officers of the General Services Administration to Act as Administrator of General Services	September 20, 2013
352	Presidential Memorandum -- Designation of Officers of the Office of the Director of National Intelligence to Act as Director of National Intelligence	September 20, 2013
353	Presidential Memorandum -- Delegation of Authority Under Sections 552(c)(2) and 614 of the Foreign Assistance Act of 1961, as Amended	September 27, 2013
354	Presidential Determination-- Child Soldiers	September 30, 2013
355	Presidential Memorandum -- Refugee Admissions for Fiscal Year 2014	October 2, 2013
356	Presidential Memorandum -- Provision of U.S. Drug Interdiction Assistance to the Government of Brazil	October 10, 2013
357	Presidential Memorandum -- Delegation of Functions Under Sections 1261(b) and 1262(a) of Public Law 112-239	October 28, 2013
358	Presidential Determination -- Iran Oil	November 29, 2013
359	Presidential Memorandum -- Federal Leadership on Energy Management	December 5, 2013
360	Presidential Memorandum -- Central African Republic Drawdown	December 10, 2013
361	Presidential Memorandum -- Aviation Insurance	December 27, 2013
362	Presidential Memorandum -- Establishing a Quadrennial Energy Review	January 9, 2014
363	Presidential Determination -- Proposed Third Amendment to the Agreement for Co-operation Between the United States of America and the International Atomic Energy Agency	January 17, 2014
364	Presidential Memorandum -- Delegation of Authority under Section 1245(d)(5) of the National Defense Authorization Act for Fiscal Year 2012	January 20, 2014
365	Memorandum -- Establishing a White House Task Force to Protect Students from Sexual Assault	January 22, 2014
366	Presidential Memorandum -- Retirement Savings Security	January 28, 2014
367	Presidential Memorandum -- Job-Driven Training for Workers	January 30, 2014
368	Presidential Memorandum -- Enhancing Safeguards to Prevent the Undue Denial of Federal Employment Opportunities to the Unemployed and Those Facing Financial Difficulty Through no Fault of Their Own	January 31, 2014
369	Presidential Memorandum -- Certification Concerning U.S. Participation in the United Nations Multidimensional	January 31, 2014
370	Presidential Determination -- Proposed Nuclear Agreement with Vietnam	February 24, 2014
371	Presidential Memorandum -- Creating and Expanding Ladders of Opportunity for Boys and Young Men of Color	February 27, 2014
372	Presidential Memorandum -- Updating and Modernizing Overtime Regulations	March 13, 2014
373	Memorandum -- Iceland and the Fisherman's Protective Act	April 1, 2014
374	Memorandum -- Pelly Certification and Icelandic Whaling	April 1, 2014
375	Presidential Memorandum -- Advancing Pay Equality Through Compensation Data Collection	April 8, 2014
376	Presidential Determination -- South Sudan	May 19, 2014
377	Presidential Memorandum -- Establishing a National Goal and Developing Airport Specific Action Plans to Enhance the Entry Process for International Travelers to the United States	May 22, 2014
378	Presidential Memorandum -- Response to the Influx of Unaccompanied Alien Children Across the Southwest Border	June 2, 2014
379	Presidential Memorandum -- Suspension of Limitations under the Jerusalem Embassy Act	June 2, 2014
380	Presidential Memorandum --Presidential Determination Pursuant to Section 1245(d)(4)(B) and (C) of the National Defense Authorization Act for Fiscal Year 2012	June 4, 2014
381	Presidential Memorandum -- Federal Student Loan Repayments	June 9, 2014
382	Text of a Letter from the President to the Speaker of the House of Representatives and the President Pro Tempore of the Senate	June 16, 2014
383	Presidential Memorandum -- Comprehensive Framework to Combat Illegal, Unreported, and Unregulated Fishing and Seafood Fraud	June 17, 2014
384	Presidential Memorandum -- Creating a Federal Strategy to Promote the Health of Honey Bees and Other Pollinators	June 20, 2014
385	Presidential Memorandum -- Enhancing Workplace Flexibilities and Work-Life Program	June 23, 2014
386	Presidential Memorandum -- Delegation of Reporting Functions Specified in Section 1206(b) of the National Defense Authorization Act for Fiscal Year 2014	June 24, 2014
387	Presidential Memorandum -- Delegation of Authority Pursuant to Section 4 of the Support for United States-Republic of Korea Civil Nuclear Cooperation Act	July 11, 2014
388	Presidential Memorandum -- Expanding Public-Private Collaboration on Infrastructure Development and Financing	July 17, 2014
389	Presidential Memorandum -- Proposed Amendment to the 1958 Agreement Between the Government of the United States of America and the Government of the United Kingdom of Great Britain and Northern Ireland	July 18, 2014
390	Presidential Memorandum -- Establishing a Comprehensive Approach to Expanding Sub-Saharan Africa's Capacity for Trade and Investment	August 4, 2014
391	Presidential Memorandum -- Drawdown Under Section 506(a)(1) of the Foreign Assistance Act of 1961 for France to Support its Counterterrorism Efforts in Mali, Niger, and Chad	August 11, 2014
392	Presidential Memorandum -- Delegation of Authority Under Section 506(a) (1) of the Foreign Assistance Act of 1961	September 10, 2014
393	Presidential Memorandum -- Civil Society	September 23, 2014
394	Presidential Memorandum -- Assistance to Ukraine	September 24, 2014
395	Presidential Memorandum -- Deferred Enforced Departure for Liberians	September 26, 2014
396	Presidential Memorandum -- Certification Concerning U.S. Participation in the United Nations Multidimensional Integrated Stabilization Mission in the Central African Republic Consistent with Section 2005 of the American Servicemembers’ Protection Act	September 26, 2014
397	Presidential Memorandum -- Delegation of Authority under Section 614 of the Foreign Assistance Act of 1961	September 30, 2014
398	Presidential Memorandum -- FY 2015 Refugee Admissions	September 30, 2014
399	Presidential Memorandum -- Determination with Respect to the Child Soldiers Prevention Act of 2008	September 30, 2014
400	Presidential Memorandum -- Providing an Order of Succession Within the Federal Mediation and Conciliation Service	October 17, 2014
401	Memorandum Release -- Providing an Order of Succession Within the Social Security Administration	October 17, 2014
402	Presidential Memorandum -- Authorizing the Exercise of Authority Under Public Law 85-804	November 13, 2014
403	Presidential Memorandum -- Modernizing and Streamlining the U.S. Immigrant Visa System for the 21st Century	November 21, 2014
404	Presidential Memorandum -- Creating Welcoming Communities and Fully Integrating Immigrants and Refugees	November 21, 2014
405	Presidential Memorandum -- Suspension of Limitations under the Jerusalem Embassy Act	December 3, 2014
406	Presidential Memorandum -- Withdrawal of Certain Areas of the United States Outer Continental Shelf from Leasing Disposition	December 16, 2014
407	Presidential Memorandum -- Twelfth Quadrennial Review of Military Compensation Memorandum	January 9, 2015
408	Presidential Memorandum -- Modernizing Federal Leave Policies for Childbirth, Adoption and Foster Care to Recruit and Retain Talent and Improve Productivity	January 15, 2015
409	Presidential Memorandum -- Expanding Federal Support for Predevelopment Activities for Nonfederal Domestic Infrastructure Assets	January 16, 2015
410	Presidential Memorandum -- Withdrawal of Certain Areas of the United States Outer Continental Shelf Offshore Alaska from Leasing Disposition	January 27, 2015
411	Presidential Memorandum: Promoting Economic Competitiveness While Safeguarding Privacy, Civil Rights, and Civil Liberties in Domestic Use of Unmanned Aircraft Systems	February 15, 2015
412	Presidential Memorandum -- Delegation of Authority Under the Ukraine Freedom Support Act of 2014	February 19, 2015
413	Presidential Memorandum -- Determination and Waiver Pursuant to Section 1209 of the Carl Levin and Howard P. "Buck" McKeon National Defense Authorization Act for Fiscal Year 2015	February 20, 2015
414	Presidential Memorandum -- Establishment of the Cyber Threat Intelligence Integration Center	February 25, 2015
415	Presidential Memorandum -- Delegation of Authority Pursuant to Section 1209(b) (2) of the National Defense Authorization Act for Fiscal Year 2015	March 4, 2015
416	Presidential Memorandum -- Student Aid Bill of Rights	March 10, 2015
417	Presidential Memorandum -- Delegation of Authority Pursuant to Section 1278(b)(1) of the National Defense Authorization Act for Fiscal Year 2015	March 12, 2015
418	Presidential Memorandum --Providing an Order of Succession Within the Council on Environmental Quality	March 13, 2015
419	Presidential Memorandum -- Delegation of Authority Under the National Defense Authorization Act for Fiscal Year 2015	March 18, 2015
420	Presidential Memorandum -- Establishing the Director of White House Information Technology and the executive committee for Presidential Information Technology	March 19, 2015
421	Presidential Memorandum -- Expanding Broadband Deployment and Adoption by Addressing Regulatory Barriers and Encouraging Investment and Training	March 23, 2015
422	Presidential Memorandum -- Disposal of Defense High-Level Radioactive Waste in a Separate Repository	March 24, 2015
423	Presidential Memorandum -- Delegation of Authority Pursuant to Section 1236(b)(2) of the National Defense Authorization Act for Fiscal Year 2015	March 25, 2015
424	Presidential Memorandum -- Delegation of Authority Under the National Defense Authorization Act for Fiscal Year 2015	March 27, 2015
425	Presidential Memorandum -- Delegation of Authority to Transfer Certain Funds in Accordance With Section 610 of the Foreign Assistance Act of 1961, for Ukraine loan guarantees	March 31, 2015
426	Memorandum of Disapproval Regarding S.J. Res. 8	March 31, 2015
427	Presidential Memorandum -- Delegation of Reporting Functions Specified in Section 1637(a) of the National Defense Authorization Act for Fiscal Year 2015	April 13, 2015
428	Presidential Memorandum -- Delegation of Authority to Transfer Certain Funds in Accordance with Section 610 of the Foreign Assistance Act of 1961, as Amended	April 16, 2015
429	Delegation of Authority Under Section 506(a)(1) of the Foreign Assistance Act of 1961	April 29, 2015
430	Message to the Congress -- Military Compensation and Retirement Modernization Commission	April 30, 2015
431	Presidential Memorandum -- International Child Abduction Prevention and Return Act	May 7, 2015
432	Presidential Memorandum -- Delegation of Functions Under the Foreign Narcotics Kingpin Designation Act	May 15, 2015
433	Presidential Memorandum -- Creating a Preference for Meat and Poultry Produced According to Responsible Antibiotic-Use Policies	June 2, 2015
434	Letter from the President -- Six Month Consolidated War Powers Resolution Report	June 11, 2015
435	Presidential Determination -- Proposed Agreement for Cooperation Between the Government of the United States of America and the Government of the Republic of Korea Concerning Peaceful Uses of Nuclear Energy	June 11, 2015
436	Message to the Congress --Proposed Agreement for Cooperation Between the Government of the United States of America and the Government of the Republic of Korea Concerning Peaceful Uses of Nuclear Energy	June 16, 2015
437	Presidential Memorandum -- Delegation of Authority Pursuant to Section 8 of the United States-Israel Strategic Partnership Act of 2014	June 19, 2015
438	Notice -- Continuation of the National Emergency with Respect to North Korea	June 22, 2015
439	Presidential Policy Directive -- Hostage Recovery Activities	June 24, 2015
440	Presidential Memorandum -- Delegation of Authority Pursuant to Section 1035 of the National Defense Authorization Act for Fiscal	June 29, 2015
441	Letter from Raul Castro -- Re-establishing Diplomatic Relations and Permanent Diplomatic Missions	July 1, 2015
442	Presidential Letter -- Re-establishing Diplomatic Relations and Permanent Diplomatic Missions	July 1, 2015
443	Presidential Memorandum -- Designation of the Republic of Tunisia as a Major Non-NATO Ally	July 10, 2015
444	Presidential Memorandum -- Delegation of Authority Memorandum	July 17, 2015
445	Presidential Memorandum -- Continuation of U.S. Drug Interdiction Assistance to the Government of Colombia	August 5, 2015
446	Presidential Memorandum -- Delegation of Authority to Transfer Certain Funds in Accordance with Section 610 of the Foreign Assistance Act of 1961	August 28, 2015
447	Letter from the President -- Alternative Pay Plan for the Uniformed Services	August 28, 2015
448	Letter from the President -- Alternative Pay Plan for Federal Civilian Employees	August 28, 2015
449	Notice -- Continuation of the National Emergency with Respect to Persons Who Commit, Threaten to Commit, or Support Terrorism	September 18, 2015
450	Letter -- Continuation of the National Emergency with Respect to Persons Who Commit, Threaten to Commit, or Support Terrorism	September 18, 2015
451	Memorandum for the Heads of Executive Departments and Agencies	September 28, 2015
452	Memorandum -- Determination with Respect to the Child Soldiers Prevention Act of 2008 and Delegation of Authority Under Section 404(c) of the Child Soldiers Prevention Act of 2008	September 29, 2015
453	Presidential Determination and Memorandum -- Determination with Respect to the Child Soldiers Prevention Act of 2008 and Delegation of Authority Under Section 404(c) of the Child Soldiers Prevention Act of 2008	September 29, 2015
454	Presidential Memorandum -- Delegation of Authority Under Sections 506(a)(1) and 552(c)(2) of the Foreign Assistance Act of 1961	September 29, 2015
455	Presidential Determination -- Presidential Determination on Refugee Admissions for Fiscal Year 2016	September 29, 2015
456	Presidential Memorandum -- Presidential Determination with Respect to Foreign Governments' Efforts Regarding Trafficking in Persons	October 5, 2015
457	Presidential Determination with Respect to Foreign Governments' Efforts Regarding Trafficking in Persons	October 5, 2015
458	Message to the Senate -- Treaty between the Government of the United States of America and the Government of the People's Democratic Republic of Algeria on Mutual Legal Assistance in Criminal Matters	October 5, 2015
459	Letter From The President-- War Powers Resolution Regarding Cameroon	October 14, 2015
460	Presidential Memorandum -- Preparing for Implementation of the Joint Comprehensive Plan of Action of July 14, 2015 (JCPOA)	October 18, 2015
461	Presidential Memorandum -- Delegation of Certain Functions and Authorities under Section 213(b)(1) of the Iran Threat Reduction and Syria Human Rights Act of 2012	October 18, 2015
462	Presidential Memoranda -- Adoption Day for the Joint Comprehensive Plan of Action	October 18, 2015
463	Letters -- Continuation of the National Emergency with Respect to Significant Narcotics Traffickers Centered in Colombia	October 19, 2015
464	Notice -- Continuation of the National Emergency with Respect to Significant Narcotics Traffickers Centered in Colombia	October 19, 2015
465	Presidential Memorandum -- Delegation of Authority for Drafting and Submission of the International Trade Data System Annual Report to the Congress	October 20, 2015
466	Presidential Memorandum -- Addressing Prescription Drug Abuse and Heroin Use	October 21, 2015
467	Veto Message -- H.R. 1735	October 22, 2015
468	Presidential Memorandum: Mitigating Impacts on Natural Resources from Development and Encouraging Related Private Investment	November 3, 2015
469	Letter -- Continuation of the National Emergency with Respect to Weapons of Mass Destruction	November 12, 2015
470	Notice -- Continuation of the National Emergency with Respect to Weapons of Mass Destruction	November 12, 2015
471	Memorandum -- Distribution of Department of Defense Funded Humanitarian Assistance in Syria	November 13, 2015
472	Presidential Determination -- Oil and Petroleum Products Purchased from Iran	November 18, 2015
473	Letter -- Blocking Property of Certain Persons Contributing to the Situation in Burundi	November 23, 2015
474	Message -- 2016 Alternate Pay Plan	November 30, 2015
475	Presidential Memorandum -- Suspension of Limitations under the Jerusalem Embassy Act	December 2, 2015
476	Memorandum -- Delegation of Reporting Functions Specified in Section 941 of the Fiscal Year 2014 National Defense Authorization Act	December 2, 2015
477	Letter From The President-- OCO Designation and IMF Emergency Designation	December 18, 2015
478	Memorandum of Disapproval on S.J. Res. 24	December 18, 2015
479	Memorandum of Disapproval on S.J. Res. 23	December 19, 2015
480	Memorandum -- Promoting Smart Gun Technology	January 4, 2016
481	Veto Message from the President -- H.R. 3762	January 8, 2016
482	Presidential Determination -- Unexpected Urgent Refugee and Migration Needs	January 13, 2016
483	Presidential Memorandum ---Delegation of Certain Functions and Authorities under Section 103(b)(2)	January 15, 2016
484	Letter -- Continuation of the National Emergency with Respect to Terrorists Who Threaten to Disrupt the Middle East Peace Process	January 20, 2016
485	Notice -- Continuation of the National Emergency with Respect to Terrorists Who Threaten to Disrupt the Middle East Peace Process	January 20, 2016
486	Memorandum -- Delegation of Authority under the NDAA	January 21, 2016
487	Memorandum -- White House Cancer Moonshot Task Force	January 28, 2016
488	Presidential Memorandum -- Bipartisan Congressional Trade Priorities and Accountability Act of 2015	January 29, 2016
489	Message to the Congress -- District of Columbia's FY 2016 Budget and Financial Plan	February 2, 2016
490	Sequestration Order for Fiscal Year 2017	February 9, 2016
491	Message to the Senate -- The UN Convention on the Use of Electronic Communications in International Contracts	February 10, 2016
492	Message to the Senate -- The UN Convention on the Assignment of Receivables in International Trade	February 10, 2016
493	Notice -- Continuation of the National Emergency With Respect to Libya	February 22, 2016
494	Letter -- Continuation of the National Emergency With Respect to Libya	February 22, 2016
495	Message -- Continuation of the National Emergency With Respect to Cuba	February 24, 2016
496	Presidential Memorandum -- Limiting the Use of Restrictive Housing by the Federal Government	March 1, 2016
497	Notice -- Continuation of the National Emergency with Respect to Zimbabwe	March 2, 2016
498	Message -- Continuation of the National Emergency with Respect to Zimbabwe	March 2, 2016
499	Notice -- Continuation of the National Emergency with Respect to Ukraine	March 2, 2016
500	Message -- Continuation of the National Emergency with Respect to Ukraine	March 2, 2016
501	Notice -- Continuation of the National Emergency with Respect to Venezuela	March 3, 2016
502	Letter -- Continuation of the National Emergency with Respect to Venezuela	March 4, 2016
503	Notice -- Continuation of the National Emergency with Respect to Iran	March 9, 2016
504	Letter -- Continuation of the National Emergency with Respect to Iran	March 9, 2016
505	Presidential Memorandum -- Delegation of Authority Under Section 11 of the Export-Import Bank Reauthorization Act of 2012	March 11, 2016
506	Message -- Blocking Property of the Government of North Korea and the Workers' Party of Korea, and Prohibiting Certain Transactions with Respect to North Korea	March 16, 2016
507	Message to the Senate -- Treaty between the United States of America and the Republic of Kazakhstan on Mutual Legal Assistance in Criminal Matters	March 17, 2016
508	Presidential Memoranda -- Delegation of Authority Pursuant to the Hizballah International Financing Prevention Act of 2015 (Director of National Intelligence)	March 18, 2016
509	Presidential Memoranda -- Delegation of Authority Pursuant to the Hizballah International Financing Prevention Act of 2015 (Secretary of State)	March 18, 2016
510	Presidential Memoranda -- Delegation of Authority Pursuant to the Hizballah International Financing Prevention Act of 2015 (Secretary of the Treasury)	March 18, 2016
511	Presidential Memorandum -- Delegation of Authority Pursuant to Section 3139(a) and (b) of the National Defense Authorization Act for Fiscal Year 2016	March 18, 2016
512	Presidential Memorandum: Building National Capabilities for Long-Term Drought Resilience	March 21, 2016
513	Presidential Memorandum -- Mental Health and Substance Use Disorder Parity Task Force	March 29, 2016
514	Letter -- Continuation of the National Emergency with Respect to Somalia	April 4, 2016
515	Presidential Memorandum -- Delegations of Authority Under Sections 610, 614(a)(1), and 506(a)(2)(A)(i)(II) of the Foreign Assistance Act of 1961	April 12, 2016
516	Message -- Blocking Property And Suspending Entry Into The United States Of Persons Contributing To The Situation In Libya	April 19, 2016
517	Presidential Memorandum -- Promoting Rehabilitation and Reintegration of Formerly Incarcerated Individuals	April 29, 2016
518	Presidential Memorandum -- Delegation of Authority Pursuant to Section 3136(h) of the National Defense Authorization Act for Fiscal Year 2016	May 10, 2016
519	Message -- Continuation of the National Emergency with Respect to Yemen	May 12, 2016
520	Notice -- Continuation of the National Emergency with Respect to Yemen	May 12, 2016
521	Notice -- Continuation of the National Emergency with Respect to Burma	May 17, 2016
522	Message -- Continuation of the National Emergency with Respect to Burma	May 17, 2016
523	Presidential Memorandum -- Delegation of Certain Functions and Authorities under the North Korea Sanctions and Policy Enhancement Act of 2016	May 18, 2016
524	Presidential Memorandum -- Delegation of Authority Under Section 106 of the Bipartisan Congressional Trade Priorities and Accountability Act of 2015	May 24, 2016
525	Presidential Memorandum -- Suspension of Limitations under the Jerusalem Embassy Act	June 1, 2016
526	Veto Message from the President -- - H.J. Res. 88	June 8, 2016
527	Message -- Continuation of the National Emergency With Respect to the Actions and Policies of Certain Members of the Government of Belarus and Other Persons to Undermine Belarus's Democratic Processes or Institutions	June 10, 2016
528	Notice -- Continuation of the National Emergency With Respect to the Actions and Policies of Certain Members of the Government of Belarus and Other Persons to Undermine Belarus's Democratic Processes or Institutions	June 10, 2016
529	Presidential Memorandum -- Proposed Agreement for Cooperation Between the Government of the United States of America and the Government of the Kingdom of Norway Concerning Peaceful Uses of Nuclear Energy	June 10, 2016
530	Letter From The President -- War Powers Resolution	June 13, 2016
531	Message to Congress -- Agreement for Cooperation Between the Government of the United States of America and the Government of the Kingdom of Norway Concerning Peaceful Uses of Nuclear Energy	June 14, 2016
532	Message -- Continuation of the National Emergency with Respect to the Western Balkans	June 21, 2016
533	Message -- Continuation of the National Emergency with Respect to North Korea	June 21, 2016
534	Message to the Senate -- Protocol to the North Atlantic Treaty of 1949 on the Accession of Montenegro	June 28, 2016
535	Presidential Memorandum -- Delegation of Authority Under Sections 614(a)(1) and 610 of the Foreign Assistance Act of 1961	July 13, 2016
536	Presidential Memorandum -- Delegation of Authority Under Section 610 of the Foreign Assistance Act of 1961	July 13, 2016
537	Letter from the President -- War Powers Resolution	July 13, 2016
538	Letter from the President -- War Powers Resolution	July 15, 2016
539	Notice -- Continuation of the National Emergency with Respect to Transnational Criminal Organizations	July 20, 2016
540	Letter -- Continuation of the National Emergency with Respect to Transnational Criminal Organizations	July 20, 2016
541	Presidential Policy Directive -- United States Cyber Incident Coordination	July 26, 2016
542	Annex for Presidential Policy Directive -- United States Cyber Incident Coordination	July 26, 2016
543	Presidential Memorandum -- Delegation of Authority Under Section 1247 of the National Defense Authorization Act for Fiscal Year 2016	July 26, 2016
544	Notice -- Continuation of the National Emergency With Respect to Lebanon	July 27, 2016
545	Letter -- Continuation of the National Emergency With Respect to Lebanon	July 27, 2016
546	Presidential Memorandum -- Delegation of Functions and Authorities under the Protect and Preserve International Cultural Property Act	August 1, 2016
547	Presidential Memorandum -- Delegation of Authority Pursuant to Section 4 and Section 7 of the Electrify Africa Act of 2015	August 3, 2016
548	Presidential Determination -- Continuation of U.S. Drug Interdiction Assistance to the Government of Colombia	August 4, 2016
549	Notice -- Continuation of the National Emergency with Respect to Export Control Regulations	August 4, 2016
550	Letter -- Continuation of the National Emergency with Respect to Export Control Regulations	August 4, 2016
551	Presidential Memorandum -- Delegation of Authority Under Section 614(a)(1) of the Foreign Assistance Act of 1961	August 5, 2016
552	Presidential Memorandum -- Delegation of Authority of Unified Command Plan Responsibilities	August 5, 2016
553	Letter from the President -- Designation of Vice Chair of the United States International Trade Commission	August 11, 2016
554	Presidential Memorandum -- Designation of Officers of the Office of Personnel Management to Act as Director of the Office of Personnel Management	August 12, 2016
555	Presidential Memorandum -- Providing an Order of Succession within the National Endowment for the Humanities	August 12, 2016
556	Notice -- Continuation of the National Emergency with Respect to Certain Terrorist Attacks	August 30, 2016
557	Letter -- Continuation of the National Emergency with Respect to Certain Terrorist Attacks	August 30, 2016
558	Letter from the President -- Pay for Uniformed Services for 2017	August 31, 2016
559	Letter from the President -- Pay for Federal Civilian Employees for 2017	August 31, 2016
560	Letter from the President -- Report of the VA Commission on Care	September 1, 2016
561	Presidential Memorandum -- Emergency Leave Transfer Program for Federal Employees Adversely Affected by the Severe Storms and Flooding in Louisiana	September 6, 2016
562	Presidential Determination -- Major Drug Transit or Major Illicit Drug Producing Countries for Fiscal Year 2017	September 12, 2016
563	Presidential Determination -- Continuation of the Exercise of Certain Authorities Under the Trading With the Enemy Act	September 13, 2016
564	Message to Congress -- Termination of the National Emergency with the Situation in or in Relation to Côte d'Ivoire	September 14, 2016
565	Presidential Message to the Congress -- Restoring Burma's Trade Benefits Under the Generalized System of Preferences (GSP)	September 14, 2016
566	Letter -- Continuation of the National Emergency with Respect to Persons who Commit, Threaten to Commit, or Support Terrorism	September 15, 2016
567	Notice -- Continuation of the National Emergency with Respect to Persons who Commit, Threaten to Commit, or Support Terrorism	September 15, 2016
568	Presidential Memorandum -- Climate Change and National Security	September 21, 2016
569	Letter from the President -- Report to the Congress Regarding the Accession of Montenegro to the North Atlantic Treaty	September 22, 2016
570	Veto Message from the President -- S.2040	September 23, 2016
571	Presidential Proclamation -- National Voter Registration Day, 2016	September 26, 2016
572	Presidential Determination -- Foreign Governments' Efforts Regarding Trafficking in Persons	September 27, 2016
573	Presidential Memorandum -- Deferred Enforced Departure for Liberians	September 28, 2016
574	Presidential Determination -- Refugee Admissions for Fiscal Year 2017	September 28, 2016
575	Presidential Determinations with Respect to the Child Soldiers Prevention Act of 2008, and Delegation of Authority Under Section 404(c) of the Child Soldiers Prevention Act of 2008	September 28, 2016
576	Letter from the President -- Designations for Emergency Funding for Zika Response in Accordance with Section 5 of the Continuing Appropriations and Military Construction, Veterans Affairs, and Related Agencies Appropriations Act, 2017	September 29, 2016
577	Letter from the President -- Funding Designations for Overseas Contingency Operations/Global War on Terrorism in accordance with section 401 of division A and section 114(c) of division C of the Continuing Appropriations and Military	September 29, 2016
578	Presidential Memorandum -- Transfer of Unified Command Plan Responsibilities	September 30, 2016
579	Presidential Memorandum -- Promoting Diversity and Inclusion in the National Security Workforce	October 5, 2016
580	Letter -- Termination of Emergency with Respect to the Actions and Policies of the Government of Burma	October 7, 2016
581	Presidential Policy Directive -- United States-Cuba Normalization	October 14, 2016
582	Letter from the President -- War Powers Resolution	October 14, 2016
583	Letter -- Continuation of the National Emergency with Respect to Significant Narcotics Traffickers Centered in Colombia	October 18, 2016
584	Notice -- Continuation of the National Emergency with Respect to Significant Narcotics Traffickers Centered in Colombia	October 18, 2016
585	Letter -- Continuation of National Emergency with respect to the Democratic Republic of the Congo	October 21, 2016
586	Notice -- Continuation of National Emergency with respect to the Democratic Republic of the Congo	October 21, 2016
587	Letter -- Continuation of National Emergency with Respect to Sudan	October 31, 2016
588	Notice -- Continuation of National Emergency with Respect to Sudan	October 31, 2016
589	Letter -- Continuation of National Emergency with Respect to Iran	November 3, 2016
590	Notice -- Continuation of National Emergency with Respect to Iran	November 3, 2016
591	Letter -- Continuation of the National Emergency with Respect to the Proliferation of Weapons of Mass Destruction	November 8, 2016
592	Notice -- Continuation of the National Emergency with Respect to The Proliferation of Weapons of Mass Destruction	November 8, 2016
593	Letter -- Continuation of the National Emergency with Respect to Burundi	November 9, 2016
594	Notice -- Continuation of the National Emergency with Respect to Burundi	November 9, 2016
595	Letter from the President -- Fiscal Year 2017 Budget amendments	November 10, 2016
596	Presidential Memorandum: Advancing Fair Practices by Education and Training Institutions Serving Service Members, Veterans, Eligible Spouses, and Other Family Members	November 11, 2016
597	Presidential Determination Pursuant to Section 1245(d)(4)(B) and (C) of the National Defense Authorization Act for Fiscal Year 2012	November 14, 2016
598	Presidential Memorandum -- Eligibility of the Multinational Force and Observers to Receive Defense Articles and Defense Services	November 16, 2016
599	Presidential Determination -- Suspension of Limitations under the Jerusalem Embassy Act	December 1, 2016
600	Presidential Determination -- Pursuant to Section 570(a) of the Foreign Operations, Export Financing, and Related Programs Appropriations Act, 1997	December 2, 2016
601	Letter from the President -- Supplemental 6-month War Powers Letter	December 5, 2016
602	Presidential Memorandum -- Steps for Increased Legal and Policy Transparency Concerning the United States Use of Military Force and Related National Security Operations	December 5, 2016
603	Message to Congress -- Brazil Social Security Agreement	December 8, 2016
604	Presidential Determination and Waiver -- Pursuant to Section 2249a of Title 10, United States Code, and Sections 40 and 40A of the Arms Export Control Act to Support U.S. Special Operations to Combat Terrorism in Syria	December 8, 2016
605	Message to the Senate -- Arms Trade Treaty	December 9, 2016
606	Message to the Senate -- UN Convention on Transparency in Treaty-Based Investor-State Arbitration	December 9, 2016
607	Presidential Memoranda -- Minnesota World's Fair 2023	December 9, 2016
608	Presidential Memorandum -- Withdrawal of Certain Portions of the United States Arctic Outer Continental Shelf from Mineral Leasing	December 20, 2016
609	Presidential Memorandum -- Withdrawal of Certain Areas off the Atlantic Coast on the Outer Continental Shelf from Mineral Leasing	December 20, 2016
610	Presidential Memorandum -- Supporting New American Service Members, Veterans, and their Families	December 22, 2016
611	Presidential Memorandum -- Designation of Officers of the National Archives and Records Administration to Act as Archivist of the United States	December 23, 2016
612	Presidential Memorandum -- Providing an Order of Succession within the National Endowment for the Arts	December 23, 2016
613	Presidential Memorandum -- Providing an Order of Succession within the Social Security Administration	December 23, 2016
614	Presidential Memorandum -- Providing an Order of Succession within the Federal Mediation and Conciliation Service	December 23, 2016
615	Letter from the President -- Taking Additional Steps to Address the National Emergency with Respect to Significant Malicious Cyber-Enabled Activities	December 29, 2016
616	Letter from President Obama on Cabinet Exit Memoranda	January 5, 2017
617	Presidential Proclamation -- Boundary Enlargement of the Cascade-Siskiyou National Monument	January 12, 2017
618	Presidential Memorandum -- Promoting Diversity and Inclusion in Our National Parks, National Forests, and Other Public Lands and Waters	January 12, 2017
619	Presidential Proclamations -- Establishment of the Freedom Riders National Monument	January 12, 2017
620	Letter -- Recognizing Positive Actions by the Government of Sudan and Providing for the Revocation of Certain Sudan-Related Sanctions	January 13, 2017
621	Presidential Memorandum -- The Director of the Federal Mediation and Conciliation Service	January 13, 2017
622	Presidential Memorandum -- The Director of the Office of Science and Technology Policy	January 13, 2017
623	Presidential Memorandum -- The Chairman of the Council on Environmental Quality	January 13, 2017
624	Letters from the President -- Designation of the Chair of the United States International Trade Commission	January 13, 2017
625	Presidential Memorandum -- Continuing to Expand Opportunity for All Young People	January 13, 2017
626	Letter -- Continuation of National Emergency with Respect to Terrorists Who Threaten to Disrupt the Middle East Peace Process	January 13, 2017
627	Notice -- Continuation of National Emergency with Respect to Terrorists Who Threaten to Disrupt the Middle East Peace Process	January 13, 2017
628	Notice -- Continuation of the National Emergency with Respect to Libya	January 13, 2017
629	Notice -- Continuation of National Emergency with Respect to Ukraine	January 13, 2017
630	Letter -- Continuation of National Emergency with Respect to Ukraine	January 13, 2017
631	Notice -- Continuation of National Emergency with Respect to Zimbabwe	January 13, 2017
632	Letter -- Continuation of National Emergency with Respect to Zimbabwe	January 13, 2017
633	Letter -- Continuation of National Emergency with Respect to Cuba	January 13, 2017
634	Notice -- Continuation of National Emergency with Respect to Cuba	January 13, 2017
635	Letter -- Continuation of the National Emergency with Respect to Libya	January 13, 2017
636	Notice -- Continuation of the National Emergency with Respect to Venezuela	January 13, 2017
637	Letter -- Continuation of the National Emergency with Respect to Venezuela	January 13, 2017
638	Notice -- Continuation of the National Emergency With Respect to Iran	January 13, 2017
639	Letter -- Continuation of the National Emergency With Respect to Iran	January 13, 2017
640	Presidential Proclamation -- Religious Freedom Day, 2017	January 13, 2017
641	Presidential Memorandum -- Delegating Authority under the National Defense Authorization Act for Fiscal Year 2017	January 17, 2017
642	Messages to the Senate -- Kosovo	January 17, 2017
643	Messages to the Senate -- Serbia Treaties	January 17, 2017
644	Letter from the President -- Report with Respect to Guantanamo	January 19, 2017
