= Whitehouse.com =

Adult entertainment website

- Website type: Adult, news
- Available in: English
- Owner: Dan Parisi
- Website: www.whitehouse.com
- Commercial: Yes
- Launched: May 21, 1997; 29 years ago
- Current status: Active

whitehouse.com is a political entertainment website that first came online in May 1996. According to a statement on the web, it was originally created by Ransom Scott as a known place where uncensored discussion of government policies could occur before adult content was added to make it more profitable. In June 2022, adult content was added back to the website, but was later removed again.

== Controversy ==
The site's hosting of adult content paralleled the dot-com bubble, when Internet development focused on the promotion of websites with .com domains. A person seeking information about the White House, the American landmark residence/place-of-work, might expect to find such a thing at a .com address. The possibility of a minor making this mistake was especially noted. Because of the explicit and commercial content of the site, it was frequently cited as one of the most egregious examples of domain name misuse, up until the domain was sold.

The website whitehouse.org, a humor site that formerly satirized the former U.S. president George W. Bush, remains controversial for similar reasons, although less so because its content is usually much less explicit.

In 2006, PC World ranked Whitehouse.com #13 on its list of "The 25 Worst Web Sites".

== Opposition ==
In December 1997, a cease and desist letter was sent to Parisi from the White House, stating: "…we do not challenge your right to pursue it or to exercise your First Amendment rights, but we do challenge your right to use the White House, the President, and the First Lady as a marketing device. For adult internet users, that device is, at the least, part of a deceptive scheme. For younger Internet users, it has more disturbing consequences." The letter had no effect and the site stayed up.

== Statuses and uses ==
In 2004, Dan Parisi decided to sell the domain, primarily because his son would be going into kindergarten the next year. The sale did not occur. As of 2003, Parisi was making US$1 million annually from the site alone. Parisi had said he did not want to sell the domain name to anyone in the adult entertainment industry, and even claimed to have turned down what was essentially a blank check from a buyer hiding his identity behind his broker.

In November 2005, the domain appeared to be used for a real estate site. In December 2005 it contained only Google ads, with a notice that a site for investigating people by checking their public records would be coming. In March 2006, whitehouse.com called itself "America's Free Speech Forum". It advertised a cartoon contest and presented links to Associated Press political news stories. In July 2006, the site was a real estate site again, and forwarded to www.house.com. As of November 2006, the site was a search engine for people, which searched over 90 million White Pages listings and 14 million Yellow Pages listings. As of June–October 2007, the site had once again changed and now claimed to be "your source for up-to-date information to help you keep track of the major party candidates for President."

Until early 2009, the domain redirected to the previous real estate website again. The site was being used for home loan modification and debt consolidation, with the disclaimer reading that is not "affiliated or endorsed by the U.S. Government". As of September 2009, the site was a local New Jersey-centered video hosting site. The site's main purpose was to host videos of local town hall meetings in New Jersey.

As of July 2010, the site was a blank page with large black letters stating, "Future site of WhiteHouse.com" with no other information or link. As of Sept 2010, the site returned with the Banner Heading of WhiteHouseLawyers.com. The site's purported main purpose was to provide a search portal for personal injury / disability lawyers based on users location. But upon testing user input including name, phone, state, and e-mail, no listing of lawyers was provided. Later that month the site advertised financial aid opportunities. As of June 2011, the site again redirected to www.house.com.

As of October 2015, the domain was parked, displayed a picture of the White House and text advertisement 'search results' relating to the White House, Washington D.C. or adult services. As of June 2016, the site displayed a blank page with black letters stating, "WhiteHouse.com Official Site". The subtext read, "Celebrating our 19th Anniversary (1997-2016)" and "World's Most Famous Adult Site coming back Summer 2016".

As of April 2017, the site was once again parked, with similar content as in its October 2015 version. As of August 2017, the site was being used to protest the Trump administration in the wake of the Unite the Right rally. As of November 2017, the site was again a parked domain. By January 2018, the site contained a collection of brief political news stories with the slogan "Where Hate does not Live!". The website claims to be owned and operated by WhiteHouse Network LLC. WHOIS data suggests the domain is administrated by Dan Parisi.

As of May 2020, the site was offering information about the COVID-19 pandemic, plus an opinion poll on the Trump administration's handling of the COVID-19 crisis in the United States. It still listed "WhiteHouse Network LLC" as its owner. A misspelled disclaimer at the footer of the site claims "WhiteHouse Beta is not affiliated or endorsed by U.S. Gopvernment [sic]". As of January 2020, the site offers betting for senate and house election results.

In 2022, the website relaunched as an "Adult & Free Speech Site" with adult content once again. In 2023 it showed polls and urged visitors to bet on certain outcomes. In 2024 into 2025, it turned into a betting site for politics, similar to Polymarket and without adult content.

== Legacy ==
This type of behavior with trademarks led the United States government to the passage of the Anticybersquatting Consumer Protection Act. The ACPA, however, protects only the registration of trademarks as domain names and would not help the U.S. government with the registration of the names of its offices or agencies.

== See also ==
- typosquatting
- whitehouse.org
