= Edward Goldie (footballer) =

Scottish footballer

Personal information
- Full name: Edward Goldie
- Date of birth: 15 May 1873
- Place of birth: Motherwell, Scotland
- Height: 5 ft 6 in (1.68 m)
- Position: Inside forward

Senior career*
| Years | Team | Apps | (Gls) |
| 1891–1893 | Newton Thistle | | |
| 1893–1894 | Cambuslang Hibernian | | |
| 1894–1897 | Motherwell | 50 | (15) |
| 1897–1898 | Grimsby Town | 26 | (5) |
| 1898–1899 | Reading | | |
| 1899–1??? | Bristol City | | |
- * Club domestic league appearances and goals

Edward Goldie (15 May 1873 – after 1898) was a Scottish professional footballer who played as an inside forward.
