= White House Wire =

American news aggregation website

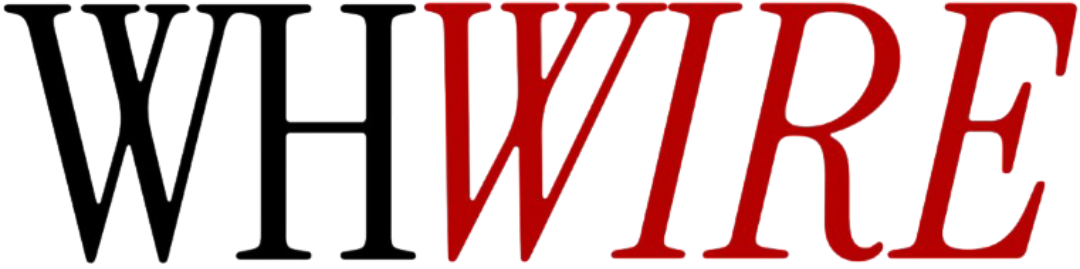

- Home page of the website
- Website type: News aggregator, state media
- Founded: May 1, 2025
- Headquarters: {{{location_country}}}
- Owner: Federal government of the United States
- Creator: Donald Trump
- Website: whitehouse.gov/wire
- Current status: Active

White House Wire, also known as WH Wire, is a news aggregation website launched by US president Donald Trump on May 1, 2025. The site took inspiration from the Drudge Report, a political news aggregation website.

== Origins ==
Trump launched White House Wire on May 1, 2025. The website's purpose is to be a news aggregation website that promotes news favoring Trump to counter criticism of him in the media. The site's design took inspiration from the Drudge Report, a prominent news aggregation website, and has similar looking bulletin-boards with columns that link to pro-Trump news articles. Visitors noted that the site has a white background and is written in large, bold text, similar to the Drudge Report website. It was also noted that the site usually republishes articles with all-caps headlines, just like the Drudge Report. White House Wire styled itself as an "alternative outlet" made for Trump supporters who wanted to see pro-Trump administration content and avoid mainstream media outlets that were labeled by Trump as "fake news". The White House promoted the website on Twitter on the day of its foundation, writing: "The White House has its own wire now, Read what we're reading".

== Content and analysis ==
White House Wire is hosted on whitehouse.gov. It often republishes U.S. government press releases and social media posts. A White House official interviewed by Axios said the website is a way to provide "transparency" and that it is "a place for supporters of the president's agenda to get the real news". The website features articles from mainstream media outlets like the Associated Press (AP) and ABC News that report positive news about Trump. The website has also featured links to Fox News, Newsweek op-eds, articles in The Daily Caller and Twitter posts.

An August 2025 study published in the Columbia Journalism Review found that the most commonly used sources on White House Wire include the official White House YouTube channel, the White House website, Fox News and Breitbart News. The study also found a decrease in links to X after the Trump–Musk feud. An analysis of the website by Jim Nielsen two months after its creation found YouTube was the most frequently linked source, followed by Fox News, The Post Millennial, and Fox Business. All YouTube links were reported to lead to content made by the Trump administration.

== Reactions ==
On the day of the site's launch Drudge Report founder Matt Drudge jokingly said he is considering $1 trillion lawsuit against the website. The Drudge Report published stories that mocked the website, with one saying: "IT TAKES AN ENTIRE WEST WING TO COMPETE WITH DRUDGE". Donald Trump Jr. praised the website and stated in a Twitter post: "Give a middle finger to the fake news and check out WH Wire!!!!". It was noted by The Verge on July 3, 2025, that the creation of the website happened during a time when the Trump Administration began to act hostile to mainstream media outlets who criticized Trump.

The Atlantic called the website "propagandistic" and said it is an example of the Trump administration's efforts against mainstream media. Reporters Without Borders called the site a "taxpayer-funded propaganda site". Some users of social media compared the site to state media or state propaganda. TechNews criticized the website, saying it is a sign that the US government is becoming hostile to independent journalism.
