= Edward Mount =

Scottish footballer

Personal information
- Date of birth: 18 January 1875
- Place of birth: Cambuslang, Scotland
- Date of death: 1938 (aged 62–63)
- Height: 5 ft 7 in (1.70 m)
- Position: Wing half

Senior career*
Years	Team	Apps	(Gls)
1893–1897	Cambuslang Hibernian		
1897	Grimsby Town	4	(0)
- * Club domestic league appearances and goals

Edward Mount (18 January 1875 – 1938) was a Scottish professional footballer who played as a wing half.
