= Office of Digital Strategy =

Executive Branch of the US federal government

White House Director of Digital Strategy
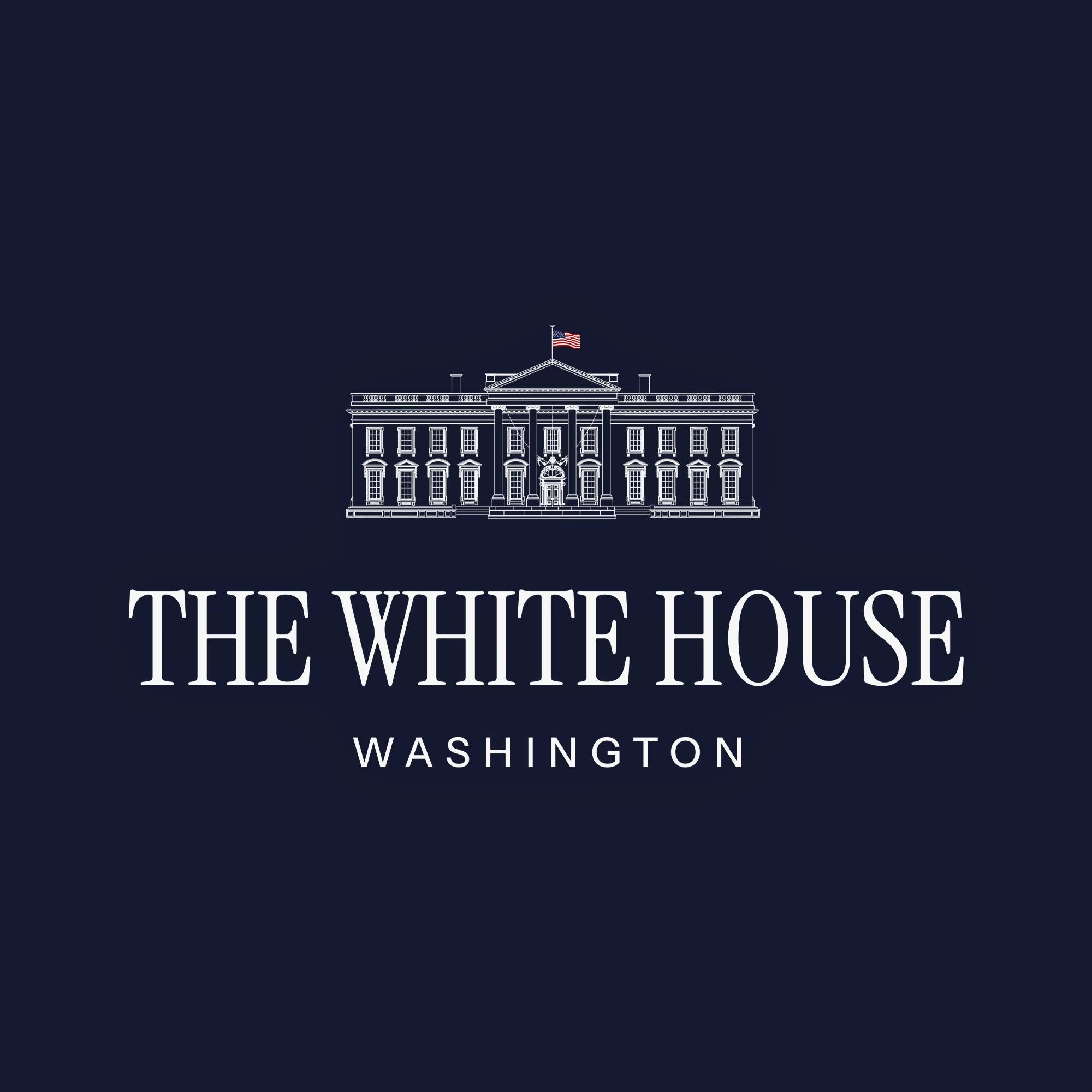
- Incumbent; Unknown since January 2025
- Executive Office of the President; White House Office
- Reports to: White House Chief of Staff
- Appointer: President of the United States

The Office of Digital Strategy (ODS) is an executive branch agency that promotes the U.S. president's messaging through digital and social media. It is part of the White House Office and is led by the assistant to the president and director of Digital Strategy, who reports to the White House chief of staff.

== Role ==
The Office of Digital Strategy (ODS) manages the president's and the White House's online communications across social media, digital influencers and creators, and creative production. ODS manages the White House Video Team and the Creative Design Shop, as well as whitehouse.gov. The department also collaborates with other internal teams as well as external ones, including congressional offices and cabinet agencies, on digital initiatives and event coverage.

== Obama administration ==
Nate Lubin headed the office for part of President Barack Obama's tenure. Jason Goldman succeeded Lubin in 2015, serving as the first-ever U.S. chief digital officer. Clay Dumas was the chief of staff for the Office of Digital Strategy, and Ashleigh Axios also worked in the office during Obama's presidency. Peter Welsch also had a role.

== First presidency of Donald Trump ==
Ory Rinat was the chief digital officer for Donald Trump's administration. The Trump administration reworked the Whitehouse.gov website and managed various social media tools, including Twitter, to communicate its messaging. The Office of Social Media was headed by Dan Scavino during the Trump administration.

== Biden administration ==
In June 2023, Christian Tom took over the role of head of Social Media in the Office of Digital Strategy

The Office of Digital Strategy, under the administration of Joe Biden as of July 2024, was as follows.

- Assistant to the president and director of Digital Strategy: Christian Tom
  - Chief of staff for the Office of Digital Strategy: Evan Romero
    - Staff assistant: Deterrian Jones
  - Deputy assistant to the president and senior advisor for Digital Strategy: Patrick Stevenson
    - Director of Partnerships: Marian Dimaano
      - Deputy director of Partnerships: Morgan MacNaughton
    - Director of Digital Engagement: Ariana Mushnick
      - Digital Engagement coordinator: Sam Schmir
  - Deputy assistant to the president and deputy director of Digital Strategy: Tericka Lambert
    - Director of Platforms: Angela Krasnick
      - Deputy director of Platforms: Megan Coyne
      - Deputy director of Platforms: Avery Whitehead
      - Deputy director of Platforms: Andy Volosky
    - Creative director: Meena Yi
      - Deputy creative director: Abbey Pitzer
      - Graphic designer: Shae Greene
    - Video director: Melanie Duran
      - Official videographer for the President: Jenna Sumar
      - Director of presidential Video Production: Joy Ngugi
      - Senior video producer: Aaron Wilson Watson
      - Senior video producer: Stephanie Shen

== Second presidency of Donald Trump ==
Billy McLaughlin served as director of Digital Content for the White House in the second administration's digital strategy, emphasizing meme-based and culturally referential content across social media platforms. McLaughlin later revealed that this approach emphasized quick responses, humor, and viral formats to enhance audience reach and engagement, representing a shift from traditional government communication methods.
