= Cambuslang Hibernian F.C. =

Association football club in Scotland

Coordinates: 55.81773°N 4.156748°W

- Founded: 1884 (senior); 1892 (junior)
- Dissolved: 1889 (senior); 1908 (junior)
- Ground: Westburn Park; Cambuslang; South Lanarkshire
Home colours

Cambuslang Hibernian F.C., also known as the Cambuslang Hibs, was a football club based in the town of Cambuslang, Scotland which was originally founded in 1884. They competed in regional competitions and the Scottish Cup during the 1880s before dissolving in 1889 after being expelled from the Scottish Football Association over a payments dispute. They reformed in 1892 as a Scottish Junior Football Association club, and won the Scottish Junior Cup in 1896. Overlooked for a place in some of the more lucrative competitions organised over the next decade, they became defunct in 1908.

== History ==
Cambuslang Hibernian (established in 1884, some years after Cambuslang F.C.) were one of several teams formed in the late 19th century to represent, or raise funds for, the local Irish immigrant communities in Scotland; the main survivors of these early outfits are the major clubs Celtic F.C. from Glasgow and Hibernian F.C. of Edinburgh, while Dundee United F.C. changed their name from 'Dundee Hibernian' in the 1920s aiming to broaden their appeal.

=== Senior years ===
Cambuslang Hibernian entered the (senior) Scottish Cup four times between 1886 and 1889 (there was no national league competition in place at the time of their formation). Their best result was in 1886-87 when they defeated Cowdenbeath and Hamilton Academical before losing to Vale of Leven.

Due to Cambuslang's location just outside Glasgow within Lanarkshire, the club could enter both the Glasgow Cup and the Lanarkshire Cup. They reached the semi-finals of the Lanarkshire competition three times in a row between 1885–86 and 1887–88, losing the first two ties to Airdrieonians and the third to Motherwell. Their only attempt at the Glasgow version was the following season, 1888–89, where they were drawn against the leading club of the era, Queen's Park, in the second round and went down 4-0 at home.

The club was expelled from the Scottish and Glasgow Football Associations at the start of 1889, for "overcharging" Queen's Park and Clyde (the latter in the Scottish Cup), i.e. putting down too much in expenses in order to reduce the share of the gate to which the visitors were entitled. The club appears to have been wound up as a senior outfit after this, with Cambuslang St Bride's F.C. forming as a local replacement.

=== Junior years ===
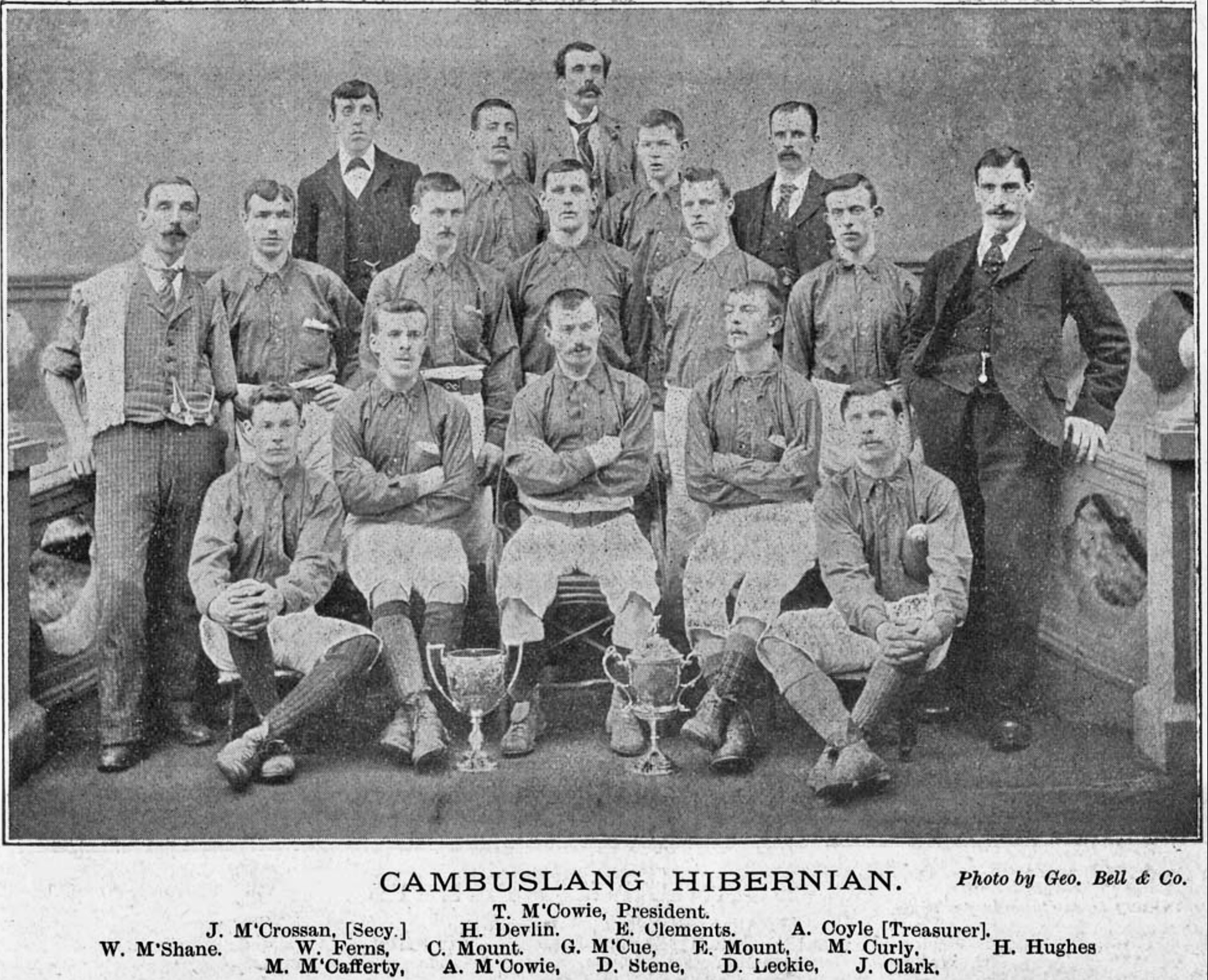
The Cambuslang Hibernian side which won the 1896 Scottish Junior Cup

Cambuslang Hibernian relaunched as a Junior club in 1892, around the same time as St Bride's ceased operations at senior level. After competing in local district competitions in the preceding years (winning the Lanarkshire Junior Cup in 1895), they entered the Glasgow Junior League (GJL) for its inaugural season in 1895–96 and won it. The same season they also won the Scottish Junior Cup, beating Strathclyde in the semi-finals and Parkhead in the final.

The 1896 success was to prove the pinnacle of the club's achievements. They never won the GJL again, although they were runners-up in 1897 and 1899. After finishing bottom of the league in 1904 they were not re-elected (Clydebank Juniors were picked instead) and although the number of teams was increased for the next season, Hibs were overlooked again in favour of emerging neighbours Cambuslang Rangers (as well as Shettleston).

Cambuslang Hibs played for one season in the second division of the GJL, but that was then disbanded and they moved with the other rejected teams to the Glasgow District League. They completed one season there, but failed to complete a second in 1906–07 and were 'suspended'. Many of the District teams were then re-absorbed by the GJL, but Cambuslang Hibs were not among them and the club folded altogether soon after.

Hibs also failed to recreate their 1896 success in the Scottish Junior Cup, their best attempt being in 1900 when they reached the semi-finals only to be beaten by Kilmarnock's Rugby XI club. They did manage to win the less prestigious Glasgow Junior Challenge Cup in 1897 and the Glasgow North Eastern Cup in 1901.

Other teams who completed the 'double' of Scottish Junior Cup and Glasgow Junior League were Strathclyde (1897), Rutherglen Glencairn (1902 and 1919), Parkhead (1903) and Ashfield (1910).

== Colours ==
The club wore green jerseys, white knickers, and green hose.

== Ground ==
Cambuslang Hibernian played at Westburn Park, situated to the north of the railway lines and main road through the town, which is now occupied by housing in the Circuit neighbourhood. They shared the ground with Cambuslang F.C. until the older club decamped to Whitefield Park, and Cambuslang Rangers also played at Westburn before their move to Somervell Park in 1904.

== Notable players ==
In their short history, Cambuslang Hibernian acted as a stepping stone for several players who went on to play for senior clubs:

- Jimmy Conlin played with Bradford City and Manchester City, capped once for England, died in the First World War
- James Cunningham was a regular with St Mirren for seven years
- Patrick Gilhooley played for Celtic, the Scottish Football League XI and English teams including Tottenham Hotspur
- Davie Hamilton won six Scottish League titles and four Scottish Cups with Celtic.
- William McAulay played at several clubs in Scotland and England and was Aberdeen's first official goalscorer.
- Andrew McCowie was part of the Liverpool team that were runners-up in the 1898–99 Football League.
- Tommy McDermott played for Dundee, Celtic, Chelsea, Kilmarnock.
- Willie McLaughlin played for Hamilton Accies, Everton, Plymouth Argyle.
- Jimmy McMenemy won eleven Scottish Football League titles and six Scottish Cups with Celtic.
- Edward Mount turned out for Grimsby Town.
- Edward Goldie also played for Grimsby, as well as Motherwell.
- James Sheridan played for Everton, Stoke and the Irish national team.
