= Megan Coyne =

American political communications specialist

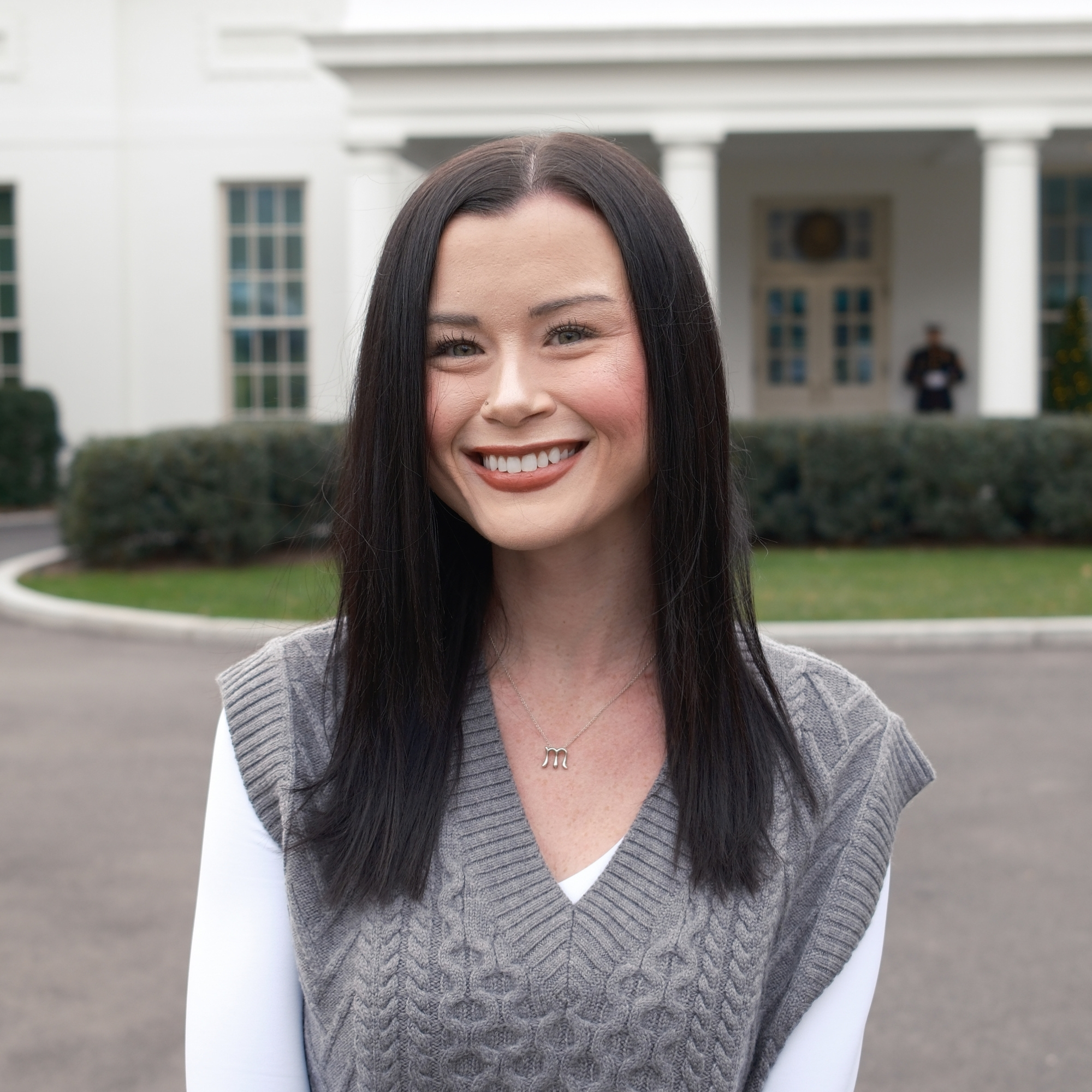
- Born: May 13, 1997 (age 29); New Jersey, US
- Education: Rutgers University (BA)
- Occupations: Vice President Mercury Public Affairs; Formerly Deputy Director of Platforms
- Employer(s): Mercury Public Affairs; Formerly The White House (2022-2025)
- Political party: Democratic

Megan Coyne (born May 13, 1997) is an American Democratic political communications strategist. She served as the White House Deputy Director of Platforms from August 2022 to January 2025 under President Joe Biden, where she oversaw the administration’s social media platforms and launched its first official Reddit account. Known for her irreverent and witty online voice, Coyne first gained national recognition while managing New Jersey's official Twitter account, transforming it into one of the most followed state government accounts in the country. In 2025, she joined Mercury Public Affairs as a vice president advising clients on digital strategy.

== Early life and education ==
Coyne was born and raised in Livingston, New Jersey, where she graduated from Livingston High School. She earned a Bachelor of Arts in political science from Rutgers University in 2019. At Rutgers, she was active in the university’s College Democrats chapter and served as president of the College Democrats of New Jersey in 2018, becoming the first woman to hold that office. Coyne was also involved in student activism, serving as vice president of Rutgers No More, an advocacy group focused on combating sexual assault. She met Phil Murphy, then a gubernatorial candidate, at a 2016 town hall event at Rutgers, later joining his 2017 campaign as an intern.

== Career ==
=== New Jersey ===
Coyne began her political career as a communications intern on Phil Murphy’s 2017 gubernatorial campaign. After Murphy’s election, she joined the Governor’s Office communications staff full-time in 2019. Working alongside digital director Pearl Gabel, Coyne became one of two people managing the state’s official Twitter account, @NJGov, and later served as social media director for both the state and Murphy himself.

Coyne’s creative use of memes, pop culture, and “Jersey attitude” on the @NJGov account drew national media attention. Tweets from the account often went viral — including a response to a troll with the phrase “your mom” that received nearly 500,000 likes. The account was praised for combining humor with civic information, earning a reputation as the most-followed official state government Twitter account in the U.S. Coyne's approach was credited with helping change the public image of New Jersey, using light-hearted and sometimes snarky content to engage residents on issues like COVID-19 guidelines, public health, and education.

=== White House ===
In August 2022, Coyne was appointed Deputy Director of Platforms in the White House Office of Digital Strategy. There, she managed digital strategy and platform-specific content for the administration’s Twitter, Facebook, Instagram, and other social channels, with a combined audience of over 30 million followers.

In one of her most widely recognized actions, Coyne led a viral response to Republican criticism of Biden's student loan forgiveness plan. The official @WhiteHouse account quote-tweeted several GOP members of Congress, pointing out the amounts of PPP loan forgiveness each had received. The tweets garnered national attention, with one journalist noting the White House had gone “goblin mode.” While the administration did not confirm Coyne authored the tweets, she posted a smiling emoticon alongside a screenshot of the trending posts, fueling speculation.

In October 2024, Coyne helped launch the first official White House Reddit account, which was used to disseminate information during Hurricane Helene and engage with Reddit users directly on government relief efforts. She stepped down from her White House role in January 2025 at the conclusion of the Biden administration's first term.

=== Post-White House ===
In March 2025, Coyne joined Mercury Public Affairs as Vice President in its New Jersey office, advising clients on social media strategy, messaging, and brand voice development. Mercury praised her as one of the country’s most successful digital political strategists.

== Recognition ==
In 2022, Coyne was named to the Forbes 30 Under 30 list in the Media category for her role in reshaping government communications at both the state and federal levels. Her work at the White House, particularly the viral PPP loan forgiveness thread, was recognized as one of the top five political tweets of the year. Coyne has been profiled by outlets including The New York Times, The New Yorker, and CBS News, and has spoken at university events and digital communications conferences on the future of social media in public service.

== Legacy ==
Coyne is widely credited with redefining the tone of government social media by blending civic engagement with internet-savvy humor and responsiveness. Her strategy influenced other government agencies and political offices to adopt bolder online voices to reach younger audiences.
