= James Conlin =

English footballer (1881–1917)

Jimmy Conlin
Personal information
- Full name: James Conlin
- Date of birth: 6 July 1881
- Place of birth: Consett, England
- Date of death: 23 June 1917 (aged 35)
- Place of death: Flanders, Belgium
- Height: 5 ft 5 in (1.65 m)
- Position: Outside left

Senior career*
Years	Team	Apps	(Gls)
- Captain Colt's Rovers
- Airdrie St. Margarets
- Cambuslang Hibernian
1899–1901	Falkirk	17	(7)
1901–1904	Albion Rovers	18	(10)
1904–1906	Bradford City	61	(5)
1906–1911	Manchester City	161	(28)
1911–1912	Birmingham	21	(2)
1912–1913	Airdrieonians	24	(5)
1913–1914	Broxburn United		

International career
1906	England	1	(0)
- * Club domestic league appearances and goals

James Conlin (6 July 1881 – 23 June 1917) was an English footballer who played as a left-sided winger.

Although born in England he spent most of his life in Scotland. He played club football for Falkirk, Albion Rovers, Bradford City, Manchester City, Birmingham and Airdrieonians between 1899 and 1913. He represented the England national side once, in 1906, in a match against Scotland, and he was only the second player in British football to be transferred for a fee of £1,000. He retired from football in 1914 just prior to the outbreak of the First World War, and was subsequently killed in action on 23 June 1917

== Early football career ==
Conlin was a "fast and tricky" player; only 5 ft 5 inches tall, he could cross balls for the centre forwards as well as score goals himself. Born in Consett, County Durham, of a Scottish steel-working father and an English mother (Luke and Mary Ann Conlin), Jimmy and his three younger siblings were raised in the Lanarkshire area east of Glasgow often referred to as Old Monkland. He began his football career playing in the Lanarkshire North Western Junior Football League with Captain Colt's Rovers. From there he moved to league rivals Airdrie St. Margarets and then on to the Glasgow Junior Football League side, Cambuslang Hibernian. From Cambuslang Hibernian he joined Falkirk sometime in 1899, making his debut in a Falkirk District Football League match away to East Stirlingshire on 30 December 1899, a game which his new team lost 6–3. In his two seasons playing at Falkirk – who were at the time playing in both the Central Football Combination and the supplemental Falkirk District Football League – Conlin scored seven goals in 17 combined league appearances, and eleven goals in 25 appearances in all competitions.

On 14 March 1901, Conlin transferred from Falkirk to Albion Rovers (his hometown club, who played in the Scottish Football Combination League), at which point his career and national notoriety as a highly talented left winger began to take off. At Rovers, Conlin won the Scottish Football Combination championship in both the 1901–02 and 1902–03 seasons, and these back-to-back titles also secured the club an election to the Scottish League Second Division for the following season (1903–04). Rovers also reached the now defunct Lanarkshire Cup Final on 15 March 1902, but lost this derby game 0–3 to Hamilton Academical. Once he was playing in the Second Division of the national league, Conlin caught the attention of scouts from a number of English clubs, and at the end of the 1903–04 season he was transferred amid great controversy to Bradford City for a fee of £100, but only after the Bantams had been fined £50 by a joint committee of English and Scottish F.A. officials for making an 'illegal' approach for the player.

== Bradford City ==
At the Valley Parade, Conlin made his Second Division debut in a home team win against Burslem Port Vale on 24 September 1904. The Bantams finished eighth in their division that season, and in his second season with the club they finished eleventh. While at Bradford, Conlin became the first City player ever to be sent off when he was dismissed during a 6–1 defeat at West Bromwich Albion on 11 November 1905. Conlin also became the club's first England international on 7 April 1906, when Scotland beat England 2–1 in Glasgow in front of a 102,741 crowd, which set a world record for an international match attendance.

Another of the more notable events in Conlin's career occurred during his time at Valley Parade. He was at the centre of an infamous incident involving Manchester United's right full back, Bob Bonthron, in a 1–5 home defeat played on 10 February 1906 during the latter club's promotion season. Both players had a reputation as being combative players; Conlin was tricky and feisty and Bonthron strong and burly, and they repeatedly clashed during the game. Bonthron's continual rough treatment of Conlin enraged the home crowd, with the result that after the game he was attacked by some of the home supporters and the United team was pelted with missiles as they left the stadium. This incident made national news headlines. Criminal charges followed against the perpetrators, and a subsequent F.A. inquiry resulted in the temporary closure of Bradford City's Valley Parade ground for the first two weeks of March 1906. During his two seasons playing for Bradford City, Conlin scored five goals in 61 league appearances, and a total of ten goals in 67 appearances in all competitions.

== Manchester City ==
On 13 July 1906, Manchester City paid £1,000 to secure Conlin's services, which was only the second time in the game's history that such a large transfer fee had been paid. His debut for the Sky Blues, against Woolwich Arsenal on 1 September 1906, was played during a freak national heatwave in temperatures of 91 °F (33 °C) in the shade and 125 °F (52 °C) in the direct sun, the match saw several players retiring from the game due to heat exhaustion. At one point the home team was reduced to having only six men on the pitch. Conlin himself was one of two City players who collapsed from the heat during the first half; however, he gamely returned for the second period of play with a knotted handkerchief on his head to better protect himself from the sun, but was still unable to help his depleted side from losing 1–4. In Conlin's first season playing for Manchester City, the club finished 17th in the First Division.

In Conlin's second season at Hyde Road the results were much better, with the club finishing third in the First Division. However, his third season saw Manchester City relegated after finishing 19th in Division One. In his fourth season with the Sky Blues in 1909–10, Conlin was a Second Division championship winner as Manchester City immediately returned to the top flight. After five seasons in Manchester (his longest period at any club) in which he scored 28 goals in 161 league appearances, and a total of 30 goals in 175 appearances in all competitions, Conlin signed next for Birmingham on 29 September 1911.

== Final years and death ==
His stay at St Andrew's was plagued by injury and he only made 23 appearances for the Second Division club, scoring twice. On 30 July 1912, Conlin moved on again for a transfer fee of £150, this time returning to Lanarkshire where he was raised to play for Airdrieonians in the Scottish League Division One. This move wasn't all that he might have hoped for, and on 7 October he was fined £2 10s for failing to turn up for a game. A brief period of triumph followed this setback, with Conlin's team beating Dykehead 5–1 to lift the Lanarkshire Cup on 30 December 1912.

Conlin's off-field issues resurfaced and he failed to turn up for several training sessions. On 4 February 1913, after admitting to having a drinking problem, he was fined again and severely warned about his behaviour. This appears to have had little effect, because on 15 April 1913 Conlin was suspended sine die and transfer-listed by the club. On 13 August 1913 Conlin made his final club transfer, joining Broxburn United who had finished bottom of the Central Football League in the previous season. Broxburn United were a new club, formed in 1912 from an amalgamation of the small town's two major clubs, Broxburn and Broxburn Athletic, and with Conlin on board the team finished in mid-table in the 1913–14 season.

At the outbreak of the Great War, Conlin enlisted in Coatbridge with the Highland Light Infantry, serving in the 15th (Service) Battalion (1st Glasgow). During June 1917 this battalion was transferred to the Nieuport sector on the Belgium coast in readiness to support the British offensive at the Third Battle of Ypres (also known as Passchendaele). This is where Private Conlin (26447) died, leaving behind a wife and two small children. He was killed in action on 23 June 1917 prior to the Third Battle of Ypres. He has no known remains or grave, his death being commemorated instead on the Nieuport Memorial, Arrondissement Veurne, West-Vlaanderen.
