= NJGov =

Twitter account of New Jersey

- Profile picture of NJGov featuring Grogu
- Website type: Twitter account
- Available in: English
- Owner: Government of New Jersey
- Creators: Pearl Gabel; Edwin Torres
- Editor: Megan Coyne (2019–2022)
- Website: twitter.com/NJGov
- Launched: April 2018; 8 years ago (Note: "@NJGov" (New Jersey) on X (formerly Twitter).)
- Current status: Online

NJGov is the official Twitter account of the state of New Jersey. It was launched in 2018 by Pearl Gabel and Edwin Torres, bringing Megan Coyne onboard in June 2019. The account began garnering attention in the press – as well as a significant follower base – in December 2019, amid Gabel and Coyne's use of NJGov in a public relations campaign to change perception of New Jersey. Shifting to a tone described in the press as "sassy" and "sharp", the account has sought to embrace and reclaim the negative perception of New Jersey by some as smelly or dirty. In addition to lighthearted Twitter antics, Gabel and Coyne sought to give substantial information about the state's current events and policies to their new follower base.

The two staffers oversaw the state's follower count rise from 17,000 in early December 2019 to 439,000 at the time of Coyne's departure in August 2022, outpacing every other official state account by February 2020. Reception of NJGov from media outlets has been generally positive.

== History ==
New Jersey	Twitter
@NJGov

savages

February 13, 2020

Zeyyyyy @NFTNYC	Twitter
@zeynepkurt05

what do you call people who live in jersey? Jersain? Jersish? Jerseese? I need to know @NJGov

February 13, 2020

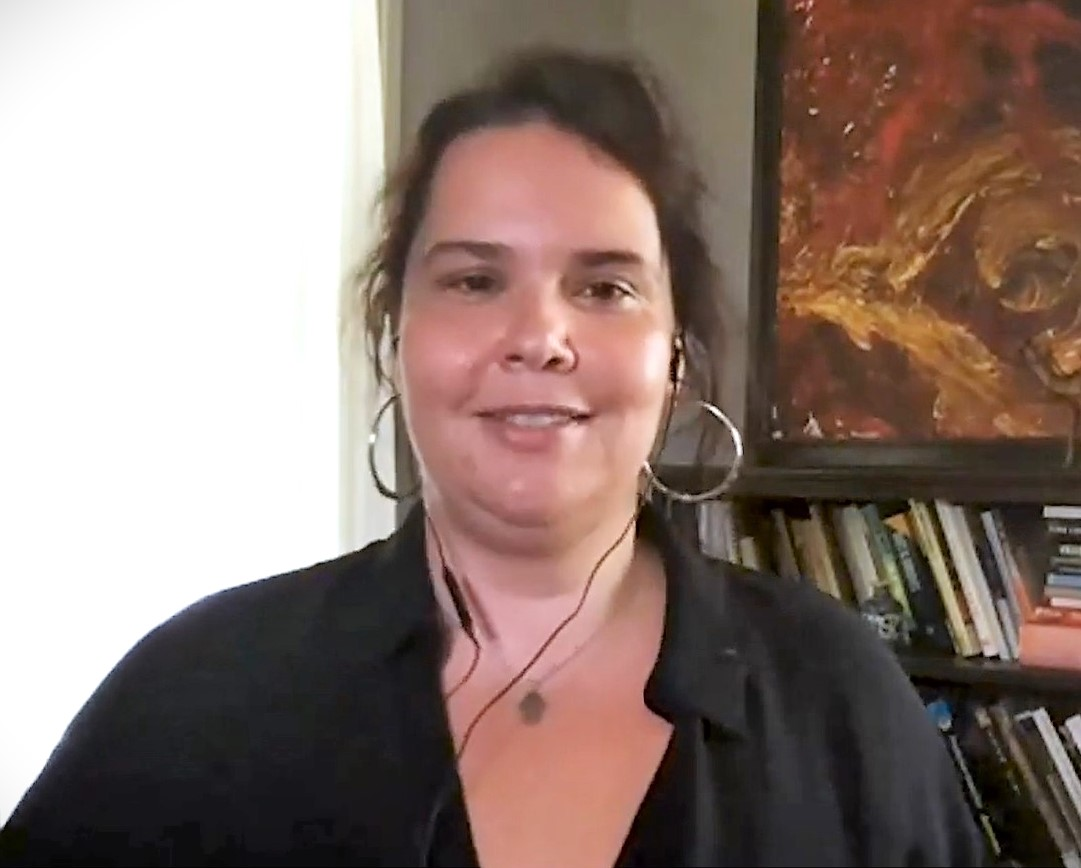
Pearl Gabel interviewed by Adweek in 2022

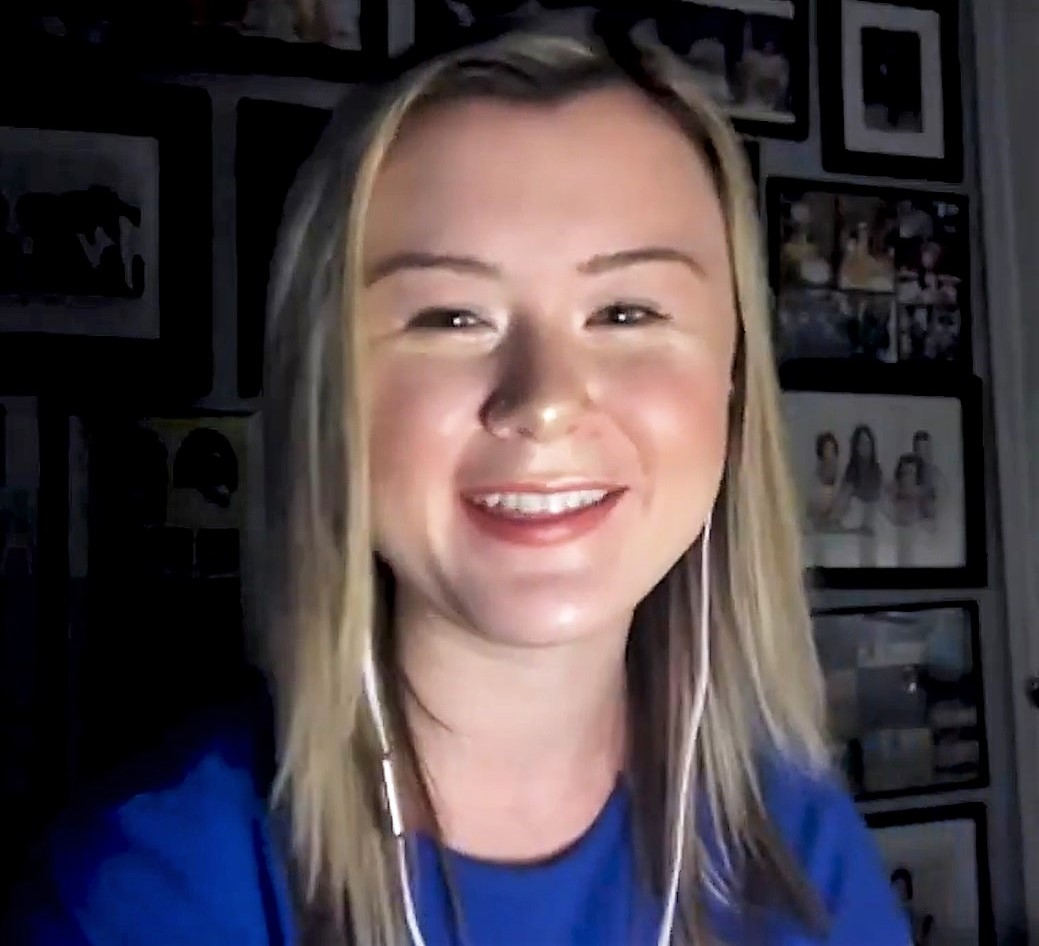
Megan Coyne interviewed by Adweek in 2022

The official Twitter account of the state of New Jersey, operating under the handle NJGov, has been active since 2018 – it was started by Pearl Gabel, New Jersey's digital director, and deputy Edwin Torres. Shea Swenson, with New Jersey Monthly, writes that the account took an "edgier" turn when Megan Coyne joined the staff in June 2019. The Twitter account struggled to gain a significant following until it saw a sharp increase in popularity in December 2019; the spike is largely attributed to Gabel and Coyne.

While the pair operated all of the state's social media accounts, only the Twitter account attracted significant outside attention. Coyne and Gabel saw the Twitter account as a way to change public perception of New Jersey; the state has been mocked as "the armpit of America", with an accompanying reputation as dirty or smelly. Coyne commented that "New Jersey's been kind of the butt of national jokes for so long... it has not the best reputation among people, and we really wanted to change that." The two looked to use the account to reclaim some of these stereotypes, making them a part of the account's identity in a positive manner.

As a Twitter user since the age of 13, the 22-year-old Coyne was able to keep the other staffers updated on cultural trends; Gabel, as an older millennial, was more adept at creating snappy one-liners, quips, and "clapbacks".

Brenna Ehrlich, writing for Rolling Stone, points to a tweet from early December 2019 in highlighting the changes made to the account's style. When one user tweeted to them, "Who let New Jersey have a Twitter account", Coyne and Gabel settled on simply responding with "your mom". The tweet has since gained over a half million likes, with Gabel commenting that "'your mom' is the gold standard" of their posts. Between December 3 and December 6, NJGov jumped from 17,000 to 40,000 followers – both Rolling Stone and The New York Times point to that tweet as the catalyst for the account's rise to popularity, while other outlets such as The Hill, Axios, and nj.com point to multiple tweets in the same timespan to explain the increase in attention. By February 2020, New Jersey's official Twitter account had a larger follower base than any other state, according to Rutgers Today. The account has been characterized as "sassy", "combative", and "sharp", and has been noted for its antics; NJGov has engaged in lighthearted feuds with the states of Delaware and Connecticut. It has also repeatedly tweeted in support of the existence of Central Jersey, as well as about New Jersey's lack of self-service gas stations.

At the same time, the account seeks to give substantial information to younger users after drawing them in with humor. In Ehrlich's piece in Rolling Stone, she summarizes the position of Phil Murphy, the governor of New Jersey: "Once they’re hooked on the jokes and memes, the government can hammer home more important issues, like voting and healthcare". Murphy told The New York Times that the account has spread "information about state policies and [informed] the public of crucial news".

On February 28, 2022, nj.com reported that the Twitter account of Ukraine was following New Jersey's account – making it one of only 24 accounts the country followed, and the only U.S. state on the list. The fact was originally popularized by a recent college graduate on the site, as the 2022 Russian invasion of Ukraine had recently gained worldwide attention. When asked why they chose New Jersey, Ukraine's Twitter account simply responded, "cauz they're cool". Coyne commented that it was a "great honor for us... New Jersey has a very large and proud Ukrainian-American community so it does mean a lot."

In August 2022, the New Jersey Globe reported that Coyne was leaving her position as social media director to join the White House Office of Digital Strategy. The Globe credited her as one of the "architects" of the account, praising her for bringing "life and a quintessential New Jersey manner to a once dull state-run Twitter account", and put NJGov's follower count at 439,000.

== Reception ==
Reception of the account has been generally positive. Journalists have praised the account's wit and sass, terming it a "Twitter account with an attitude" and "snark", and have described as "sharp, often comedic", "razor-tongued", and "like no other"; Michael Gold with The New York Times joked that the account possesses a "playfully combative New Jersey swagger". The account has also earned praise from Republicans, with one former city councilwoman commenting that she enjoyed New Jersey's online rivalry with Delaware. Gold also complimented Coyne and Gabel's understanding of their environments, writing that the two created "quips that feel authentic both to the internet and to the Garden State itself".

Writing for Axios in December 2019, Sara Fischer compared NJGov to the Instagram account of the Transportation Security Administration, which posted images of the exotic items patrons would attempt to bring on airplanes. Fischer and Ehrlich praised the account's encouragement of civic engagement with its mix of wit and substantive information, with Fischer writing that "the account tweets important government information alongside a witty mix of New Jersey inside jokes about good pizza and central New Jersey."

In addition, the New Jersey Globe credits Coyne for managing Murphy's social media accounts when he became the first Democrat in 44 years to win re-election to the governorship of New Jersey. In the piece, David Wildstein quipped that Coyne deserves a "championship ring" for her work.
