= Billy McLaughlin (political strategist) =

American political strategist

Director of Digital Content for the White House
- In office January 20, 2025 – July 25, 2025
- President: Donald Trump
- Preceded by: Angela Krasnick

Personal details
- Born: William Michael McLaughlin; March 31, 1995 (age 31) Franklin Lakes, New Jersey, U.S.
- Party: Republican
- Education: American University (BA)

William Michael McLaughlin (born March 31, 1995) is an American political communications strategist, digital media executive, and conservative activist. He is best known for his work in Republican-aligned political communication, including serving as the director of Digital Content for the White House during the second administration of President Donald Trump and as a national spokesperson and digital strategist for the National Rifle Association (NRA).

== Early life ==
William Michael McLaughlin was born on March 31, 1995, in Franklin Lakes, New Jersey. He was born the second of three sons to Michael and Kate McLaughlin.

== Career ==
In a 2023 report by the Associated Press that was republished by multiple outlets, McLaughlin said that efforts by Democratic leaders to restrict firearms would embolden criminals and reiterated that the NRA would continue to advocate for self-defense laws.

That same year, KERA News reported that the NRA issued a written statement from McLaughlin rejecting a public-health framing of firearms policy, describing such comparisons as politically motivated. In early 2024, amid internal and legal challenges facing the organization, the Washington Post reported that McLaughlin said the NRA remained a powerful defender of the Second Amendment and cited recent policy and legal victories.

McLaughlin spoke at the 2024 NRA Presidential Forum, which took place during the Great American Outdoor Show in Harrisburg, Pennsylvania, just before President Trump took the stage. On his personal website, McLaughlin later described this appearance as one of his last as an NRA spokesman, noting that the event drew more than 7,000 people.

During the second administration of President Donald Trump, McLaughlin served as director of Digital Content for the White House, contributing to official digital communications, social media strategy, and online messaging for the executive branch.

== Personal life ==
McLaughlin is openly gay. A 2020 profile highlighted that he was an openly gay employee at the NRA and had spoken to the Log Cabin Republicans of D.C., and by 2025, Out reported that he was serving as the director of digital content at the White House.

He has discussed living with a lifelong stutter; a 2024–2025 profile published by Schneider Speech quoted him describing high-stakes public-speaking challenges and noted his appointment to a White House digital role.
