= Willie McLaughlin =

Scottish footballer

Personal information
- Full name: William McLaughlin
- Date of birth: 22 June 1878
- Place of birth: Cambuslang, Scotland
- Date of death: 20 July 1946 (aged 68)
- Place of death: Glasgow, Scotland
- Positions: Inside right; centre half

Senior career*
| Years | Team | Apps | (Gls) |
| – | Cambuslang Hibernian | | |
| 1903–1904 | Hamilton Academical | 23 | (4) |
| 1904–1906 | Everton | 15 | (5) |
| 1906–1907 | Plymouth Argyle | 40 | (1) |
| 1907–1909 | Preston North End | 1 | (0) |
| 1909–1912 | Hamilton Academical | 76 | (9) |
| 1912–1914 | Shelbourne | | |
- * Club domestic league appearances and goals

William McLaughlin (22 June 1878 – 20 July 1946) was a Scottish footballer who played as an inside right for most of his career, latterly as a centre half. He played for Hamilton Academical over two spells, and was captain of the Accies team in the 1911 Scottish Cup Final (a defeat to Celtic after a replay). He also featured in the English Football League for Preston North End and Everton (though he was not selected for the 1906 FA Cup Final, having fallen behind others in the queue for selection including fellow Scot Hugh Bolton), in the Southern League for Plymouth Argyle and in the Irish League for Shelbourne. He was also a school teacher by profession.
