= Whitehouse.org =

Parody website

WHITEHOUSE.ORG
- Website type: Parody
- Available in: English
- Owner: Americatastic Inc
- Website: www.whitehouse.org
- Commercial: Yes
- Launched: August 31, 1996; 30 years ago
- Current status: Active

WHITEHOUSE.ORG was a parody website, first registered in 1995, that has satirized the president of the United States intermittently since 1996. It has been entitled TRUMP® WHITE HOUSE, and is published by Americatastic, Inc.

== Bill Clinton era ==
WHITEHOUSE.ORG was registered in 1995 by San Francisco residents Mark Pace and Brooks Talley, who first published satirical campaign spoofs on the site during the 1996 re-election campaign of President Bill Clinton against Senator Bob Dole. Pace and Talley also registered dole96.org and clinton96.org.

== George W. Bush era ==
The George W. Bush version of WHITEHOUSE.ORG was a long-running website parody of the 43rd U.S. President and his family, friends and administration. Launched by Chickenhead Productions in September 2001, the website's banner reads: "THE WHITE HOUSE" (and then in smaller print underneath) "OFFICIOUS WEBSITE OF PRESIDENT GEORGE W. BUSH". Additionally, a spoof of the seal of the president of the United States, with the bald eagle replaced with a vulture, appears on each webpage.

In spite of the site's authors' best efforts to make its satirical nature obvious, reader mail posted to the website indicated that some users nevertheless believed (or at least pretended to believe) WHITEHOUSE.ORG was the real White House website.

The George W. Bush version of WHITEHOUSE.ORG was archived at whitehouse.georgewbush.org.

=== Humor and themes ===
The website's purpose was to satirize the George W. Bush administration, their supporters and their politics using farce. The authors depicted the administration and their supporters as greedy, arrogant, overtly egotistical, culturally ignorant, nepotist, misogynist, racist, homophobic, xenophobic, antisemitic, anti-Catholic power-hungry warhawks who have absolutely no regard for any privacy or human rights other than their own. In keeping with those characterizations, women and ethnic and religious minorities who are in or favor the administration are ironically portrayed as unquestioning flock in (relatively) low-level job positions and whom the white men of the administration dislike but keep around for support. For example, former U.S. Secretary of Transportation Norm Mineta is listed as the "Chauffeur" and unfeatured anywhere but the list of members of the administration, while Justice Clarence Thomas of the U.S. Supreme Court is listed as the "Best Boy" and is satirically depicted in a reader Q&A session as incapable of responding to any questions unrelated to pornography. U.S. secretary of state Condoleezza Rice is an exception to the rule, but a poster once advertised on the site satirically depicted her exclaiming, "I'm fighting for WHITEY!"

=== Formats ===
- Speech Transcripts: One of the common strategies of the site was to publish news satire via fake press releases following a real event concerning the administration or its prominent supporters. Each fake press release purported to be the transcript of a speech, the minutes of a conversation or meeting, or an official governmental document. Each was accompanied by a doctored photograph providing a fictional visual scene for the occurrence. For example, after (in reality) Justice Antonin Scalia of the Supreme Court of the United States came under scrutiny for being a "hunting buddy" of U.S. Vice Pres. Dick Cheney while the Court was considering a case of Cheney's, Whitehouse.org included a fake dual statement titled "Joint Statement by Vice President Cheney and Justice Scalia Vigorously Defending the Propriety of Their Extracurricular Commingling" and accompanied with a false image of Cheney and Scalia together in a hot tub.
- Interactive Forms: The site produced web-based forms to satirize official government online tools, including "American Patriot Registration", "Federal Judiciary Express Confirmation", and a "White House Press Pool Application".
- "Ask The White House" Q&As: Echoing a recurring feature of the same name on the official WhiteHouse.gov, WHITEHOUSE.ORG would solicit reader questions for dozens of members of the Bush Administration, then answer them in character on its own "Ask The White House".
- Propaganda Posters: The site generated scores of satirical posters—many of which were photoshopped variations of actual classic World War II US Government propaganda posters—to critique and satirize the Bush administration. These frequently depicted President George W. Bush as childlike, jingoistic, and/or xenophobic. Sample poster slogans about Bush included "He volunteered for a beer run, and ended up running the world" and "Lookit Poppy—I can president all by myselfs!"
- Micro-Sites: WHITEHOUSE.ORG would regularly launch ancillary parody websites at alternate web domains to house specific thematic content. These included a Bush/Cheney "Re-Selection" 2004 campaign website at georgewbush.org, CRONYJOBS.com—a parody of employment website hotjobs.com specifically for unqualified Bush appointees, and the sibling "abstinence-only" sex education programs "Iron Hymen" (for girls) and "Sex Is For Fags!" (for boys).

=== Conflict with the real office of Vice President Dick Cheney ===
WHITEHOUSE.ORG gained attention in the media in 2003, when one page on the website was the center of a dispute between Vice President Dick Cheney's Counsel, David Addington, and John A. Wooden, the Editor in Chief of Chickenhead Productions. Addington made what was likely a litigation threat intended to scare the authors into censoring the website. Addington's effort, whatever the intent, backfired.

In December 2002, Addington sent a cease-and-desist letter to Wooden, arguing that certain characteristics of a satirical biography of Lynne Cheney (Dick Cheney's wife) on WHITEHOUSE.ORG were cause for litigation should Mrs. Cheney decide to file a lawsuit against Chickenhead Productions. Among the characteristics cited: photographs of her were used for a for-profit website without her permission; she was portrayed in the false biography "in a false light"; and that "few people are likely to notice your disclaimer link" and "even fewer are likely to click on the link and actually see the disclaimer." Addington also cited the spoof of the Presidential seal was displayed on every page of the website, asserting such use of the seal was a violation of federal law. In conclusion, Addington demanded that Wooden delete the photographs and fictional text of the satirical page, and to fax him with notifications of the changes, but clarified that "nothing in this request should be construed as expressing the lawfulness, wrongfulness or inappropriateness, or not, of any other aspect of your website".

WHITEHOUSE.ORG responded by doctoring photos of Lynne Cheney on the page with clown noses and the word "CENSORED", and by inserting a special disclaimer that read in part:

Mrs. Cheney's husband wishes you to be aware ... that some/all of the biographic information ... about Mrs. Cheney may not actually be true. ... the editors of WHITEHOUSE.ORG are confident that any rumors about Mrs. Cheney formerly being a crystal meth pusher are 100% likely to be absolutely untrue. Similarly, any stories about her penchant for licking Brandy Alexanders off the hirsute belly of her spouse are all lies, lies, lies!

— WHITEHOUSE.ORG

WHITEHOUSE.ORG then satirized the incident in a fake "Statement by the Vice President" on February 20, 2003, titled "Irate Vice President Cheney Issues a Punctilious, Legally Precise 'Oh, Wise Guy, Eh? Why I Oughta!' Letter to Nefarious 'Whitehouse.org' Terror Portal!".

Wooden also gave a copy of the letter to the New York City chapter of the American Civil Liberties Union, who then went to the press to speak out in defense of WHITEHOUSE.ORG's First Amendment rights. Wooden discussed the events in interviews with Salon.com and CNN. In the wake of the controversy, staffers in Vice President Cheney's office disavowed knowledge of Addington's letter, telling the Washington Post, "We consider the matter closed."

=== Spin-off book ===
In 2004, the Plume imprint of Penguin Group USA published the WHITEHOUSE.ORG spin-off book, llThe White House Inc. Employee Handbook: A Staffer's Guide to Success, Profit, and Eternal Salvation Inside George W. Bush's Executive Branchll. Written by John A. Wooden (Editor), Paul A. Bradley, John DeVore, and Chris Harper.

=== Theatrical production ===
In 2005, the site's "Reader Mail" feature, which regularly published e-mails from the general public—many intended for George W. Bush—was adapted into an off-Broadway show: "Dear Dubya: Patriotic Letters To WHITEHOUSE.ORG." Written & Curated by John A. Wooden, Directed by R.J. Tolan and Produced by John DeVore, the show ran in an extended engagement, headlining "The Moral Values Festival" in Brooklyn, NY. The New York Times praised its ability to elicit "stunningly double-edged chortles", and NYT Chief Theatre Critic Ben Brantley picked the show for his short list of "potential cult hits."

=== Late Bush hiatus and sign-off ===
After six years of regular and frequent updates, WHITEHOUSE.ORG ceased to be updated from September 14, 2007, until shortly before the inauguration of President Barack Obama. During the lengthy hiatus, on May 30, 2008, the site was briefly removed after being hacked and infected with trojan malware. While offline, the site displayed a warning page including the humorous suggestion that "communist Chineses" may be responsible, and indicating there would be no new updates until the web server is "back under our control".

On January 20, 2009, for the last day of George W. Bush's presidency, the site signed off with two final updates: "Mrs. Bush Finalizes Details Of Her Forthcoming Blockbuster Memoir: 'How My Heroic Hubby Saved An Ungrateful World'", and a lengthy satirical farewell speech from the President, headlined "Full Text of President Bush's Emotional Farewell Speech Cataloguing His Unparalleled Competence and Intelligence."

== Barack Obama era ==
For the first two years of the administration of Barack Obama, Internet traffic to WHITEHOUSE.ORG was redirected to the archived version of the George W. Bush version of the site at whitehouse.georgewbush.org. From 2011 through late 2016, attempts to access the website produced "Page Not Found" or "Site Cannot Be Reached" errors.

== Donald Trump era ==
In late December 2016, following an eight-year hiatus during the presidency of Barack Obama, the homepage of WHITEHOUSE.ORG began indicating "Coming Soon." Shortly after the inauguration of President Donald Trump in January 2017, a logo for "TRUMP® WHITE HOUSE" appeared, accompanied by "Greatness. Coming Soon." and a link to the website's Facebook page.

On January 31, 2017, the website released a YouTube-hosted video entitled "Making WHITEHOUSE.ORG Great Again!" in which digitally manipulated video of President Donald Trump makes him appear to utter profanity and promise "I'm going to make the WHITEHOUSE.ORG great again, folks." The video was accompanied by a link to a crowdfunding campaign on Indiegogo, where the site's creators indicated:

Our campaign is to reboot WHITEHOUSE.ORG for the Trump® and social media eras... Thanks to our wonderfully unique location as whitehouse.gov's loud and obnoxious nextdoor neighbor, we're perfectly situated to goad a notoriously thin-skinned megalomaniac named Donald J. Trump into fulminating fits of tweets and tantrums. Doesn't that sound fun?!

— WHITEHOUSE.ORG

To avoid confusion between the parody and the actual White House website at www.whitehouse.gov, the word "PARODY" and a link to a disclaimer are listed at the bottom of each webpage.

== See also ==
- Typosquatting
