= List of Queen's Park F.C. players =

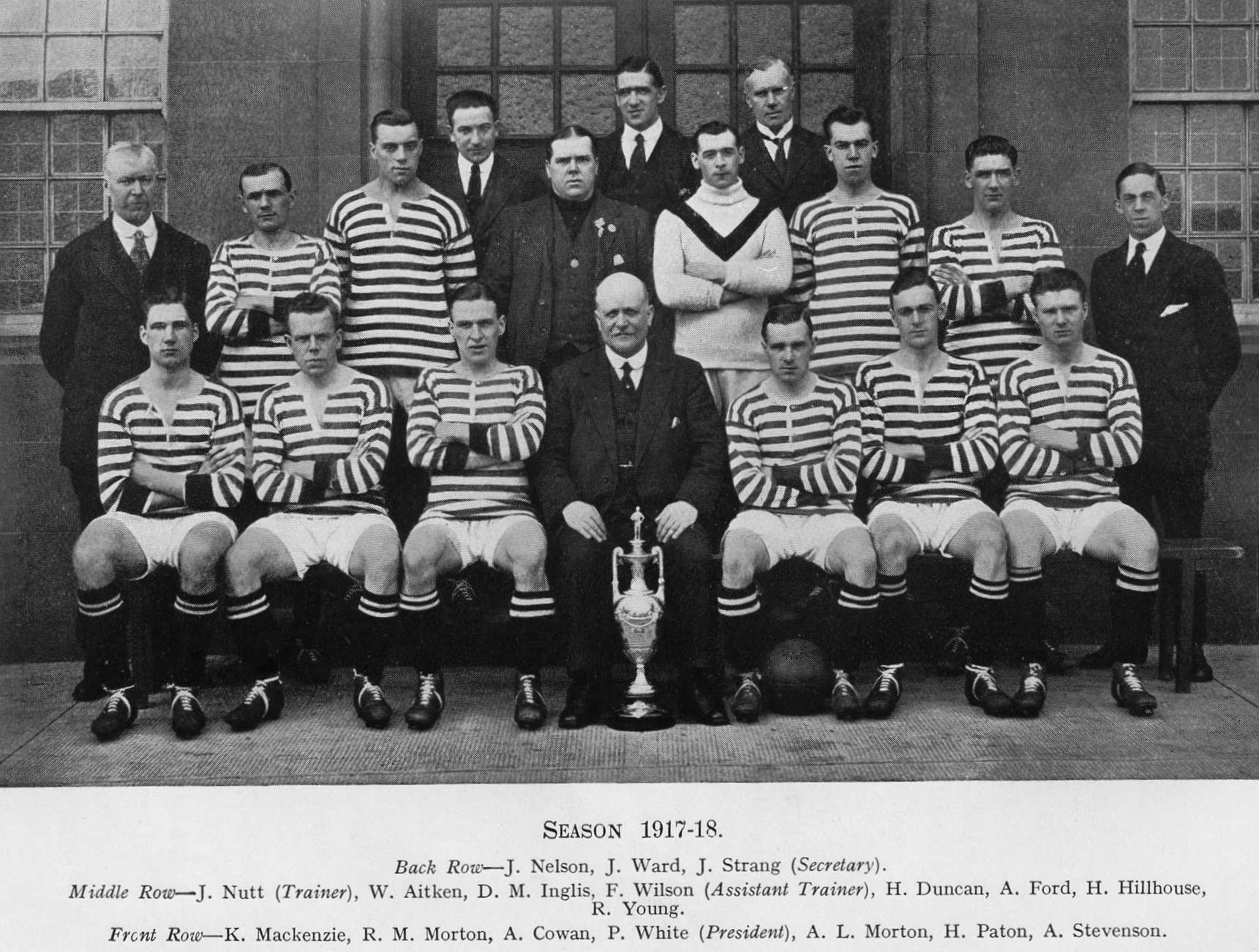
Queen's Park's 1917–18 squad.

Queen's Park Football Club is a Scottish professional football club based in Glasgow, Scotland. Between 1867 and 1900, the first team competed in cup competitions. Between 1900 and 2013, the first team competed in the Scottish League and since 2013, in the Scottish Professional League. All players who have played in 100 or more such matches are listed below.

== Records and notable players ==
Ross Caven holds the record for the greatest number of appearances for Queen's Park, having made 594 between 1982 and 2002. As of 2016, two other players have made more than 500 appearances for Queen's Park – James Crawford and James McAlpine. The club's goalscoring record is held by James McAlpine, who scored 192 goals in 547 appearances between 1920 and 1934.

Current Queen's Park players who have made 100 or more appearances for the club are Louis Longridge and Thomas Robson.

== Key ==
- Appearance and goal totals include matches in the Scottish League, Scottish Professional League, Scottish Cup, Scottish League Cup, Scottish Challenge Cup, Glasgow Cup, Glasgow Merchants Charity Cup, Glasgow League, Inter-City League, FA Cup, Spring Cup, Glasgow International Exhibition Cup, B Division Supplementary Cup, St Mungo Cup, Glasgow Dental Cup, Paisley Charity Cup, Ayr Charity Cup and Lord Provost's Unemployment Fund Tournament. Substitute appearances are included. Wartime matches (1939–1946) are regarded as unofficial and are excluded.
- "Queen's Park career" corresponds to the years in which the player made their first and last appearances.
- Players listed in **bold** won full international caps whilst with the club.
- Statistics are correct as of match played 22 December 2023.

=== Playing positions ===
GK	Goalkeeper	RB	Right back	RW	Right winger	DF	Defender	HB	Half back	IF	Inside forward	DM	Defensive midfielder
OL	Outside left	LB	Left back	LW	Left winger	CB	Centre back	FW	Forward	FB	Full back	RM	Right midfielder
W	Winger	MF	Midfielder	ST	Striker	WH	Wing half	AM	Attacking midfielder	CM	Central midfielder	LM	Left midfielder
U	Utility player	OR	Outside right	SW	Sweeper	LH	Left half	RH	Right half				

Symbol	Meaning
‡	Queen's Park player in the 2023–24 season.
*	Player has left Queen's Park but is playing in a professional league.
♦	Player went on to manage the club.
(c)	Player captained the club.
♠	Player holds a club record.

== Players ==
=== Pre-Scottish League era (1867–1900) ===
Name	Nationality	Position	Queen's Park career	Appearances	Goals	Notes
Walter Arnott	Scotland	FB	1882–1893	100	1	
Robert Smyth McColl	Scotland	FW	1894–1910	180	112	(Note: Represented the Scottish League XI.)
James Templeton	Scotland	LH	1897–1903	130	3	
David Wilson	Scotland	FW	1897–1905	159	38	

=== Early Scottish League era (1900–1919) ===
Name	Nationality	Position	Queen's Park career	Appearances	Goals	Notes	Ref
James Eadie	Scotland	RH/RB	1900–1905	105	0		
Johnny McLean	Scotland	OR	1900–1902; 1904–1909	156	41		
Andrew Richmond	Scotland	LB	1903–1910	215	9		
Harry Paul	Scotland	OL	1905–1914	209	41		
James Thomson	Scotland	RB	1905–1911	145	1		
Arthur Murray	Scotland	CH	1906–1911	159	6		
Bob Young	Scotland	FB	1906–1921	155	1		
Willie McAndrew	Scotland	RH	1907–1911	132	0		
Claude Craigie	Scotland	FB/LH	1909–1913	106	10		
Bob Morton	Scotland	CF	1912–1920	155	91		
Elijah Cresswell	Scotland	IF	1913–1918	111	13		
Alan Morton	Scotland	OL	1913–1920	247	50		

=== Interwar era (1919–1945) ===
Name	Nationality	Position	Queen's Park career	Appearances	Goals	Notes	Ref
Robert Gillespie	Scotland	CH	1919–1933	500	83	(Note: Capped by Scotland at amateur level.)	
William King	Scotland	CH/LB	1920–1931	219	9		
James McAlpine	Scotland	IL/OL	1920–1934	547	192 ♠		
Tom Pirie	Scotland	WH	1920–1923	107	3		
Edward Scott	Scotland	FW	1920–1929	175	29		
Hugh Dickson	Scotland	LH	1921–1924	109	6		
Tom Sneddon	Scotland	RB	1921–1927	102	0		
James Crawford	Scotland	OR	1922–1937	511	112	(Note: Represented Great Britain in Olympic football.)	
Russell Moreland	Scotland	CH/FW	1922–1926	138	26		
James McDonald	Scotland	RH/FW	1922–1930	264	35		
Willie Wiseman	Scotland	LB	1922–1930	315	0		
Willie Nicholson	Scotland	OL	1924–1929	190	35		
John Russell	Scotland	IR/WH	1924–1933	136	25		
Stewart Chalmers	Scotland	IF	1925–1929	106	24		
Jack Harkness	Scotland	GK	1925–1928	110	0		
Douglas McLelland	Scotland	CF	1927–1934	156	102		
John Dodds	Scotland	CF/IR	1928–1937	220	140		
Robert Grant	Scotland	WH	1928–1935	247	4		
Bob Peden	Scotland	GK	1928–1931	122	0		
Willie Walker	Scotland	FB	1928–1935	171	0		
Thomas Campbell	Scotland	RB	1929–1935	315	1		
Hutton Bremner	Scotland	IF	1929–1935	157	33		
Andrew Hosie	Scotland	CH/FW	1929–1939	200	5		
George McKenzie	Scotland	OL	1929–1933	117	16		
Thomas Smith	Scotland	GK	1929–1935	167	0		
Herbert Dickson	England	LB	1931–1939	246	3		
John Gardiner	Scotland	RH	1931–1937	194	0		
Willie Martin	Scotland	FW	1933–1938	156	58		
Joseph Kyle	Scotland	CF/IF	1934–1939	190	59		
William Buchanan	Scotland	RH	1935–1939	107	6		
Desmond White	Scotland	GK	1935–1938	117	0		

=== Post-war era (1945–2000) ===
Name	Nationality	Position	Queen's Park career	Appearances	Goals	Notes	Ref
Ian Harnett	Scotland	FB/WH	1946–1960	394	2		
David Letham	Scotland	RH	1946–1951	105	3		
Ronnie Simpson	Scotland	GK	1946–1950	110	0		
Graeme Cunningham	Scotland	OF	1947–1951	105	29		
Andy Bell	Scotland	WH	1948–1954	118	0		
Charlie Church	Scotland	OF/CF	1948–1961	260	69		
Willie Hastie	Scotland	CH/LB	1948–1958	375	18	(Note: Represented Great Britain in friendly internationals.)	
Derek Grierson	Scotland	FW	1949–1952	107	63		
Bert Cromar (c)	Scotland	U	1950–1963	484	59		
Bobby Dalziel	Scotland	IL	1950–1956	169	38		
Hastie Weir	Scotland	GK	1950–1954	120	0		
Junior Omand	Scotland	FW/WH	1951–1962	361	89		
Bill Pinkerton	Scotland	GK	1951–1962	123	0		
Jimmy Ward	Scotland	FW	1952–1957	107	61		
Johnny Valentine	Scotland	CH	1953–1957	142	0		
Frank Crampsey	Scotland	GK	1954–1958	143	0		
John Devine	Scotland	OF/IF	1954–1961	134	55		
Jimmy Robb	Scotland	LH/IR	1954–1958	125	17		
Niall Hopper	Scotland	FW/RH	1955–1969	358	73		
Charlie Gilmour	Scotland	FB	1959–1972	263	55		
Doug Grant	Scotland	WH	1959–1964	137	14		
Peter Buchanan	Scotland	CF	1960–1969	264	155		
John Cole	Scotland	WH	1960–1965	139	4		
John McLaughlin	Scotland	WH	1960–1974	180	14		
Billy Neil	Scotland	CH/FB	1961–1972	410	13		
Malky Mackay	Scotland	FW	1962–1976	432	163		
Bobby Clark	Scotland	GK	1963–1965	109	0		
Millar Hay	Scotland	IR/OR	1964–1969	191	37		
Eddie Hunter ♦	Scotland	CH	1964–1974	263	28		
Ian Robertson	Scotland	WH	1964–1973	226	13		
Tommy Barr	Scotland	FB	1965–1974	287	2		
Ian Campbell	Scotland	FW	1965–1977	280	66		
John Taylor	Scotland	GK	1966–1973	126	0		
Alex Sheridan	Scotland	LB	1967–1970	120	3		
Cammy Thomson (c)	Scotland	WH/FW	1970–1977	198	9		
Gerry Colgan	Scotland	U	1971–1977	184	25		
Bill Currie	Scotland	DF/MF	1971–1976	115	5		
John McGowan	Scotland	FB	1972–1975	105	1		
Alistair Bowie	Scotland	CB	1973–1980	170	2		
Sandy McNaughton	Scotland	FW	1973–1977	128	25		
Bobby Cameron	Scotland	GK	1974–1977	166	0		
Bobby Dickson	Scotland	LB/LW	1974–1983	305	9		
Jamie Paton	Australia	W/FW	1974–1978	130	25		
Jim Rooney	Scotland	FW/MF	1974–1978	149	21		
Bobby McSkimming	Scotland	RB	1975–1981	201	4		
Jimmy Nicholson	Scotland	FW	1975–1985	284	72		
Dougie Wilkie	Scotland	LW	1975–1979	129	17		
Jimmy Sinclair	Scotland	FW/RW	1976–1977; 1978–1981	136	2		
Derek Wood	Scotland	FW/RW	1977–1982	164	20		
Willie Cairns	Scotland	CB/MF	1978–1986	127	3		
Derek Atkins	Scotland	GK	1979–1983	200	0		
Ross McFarlane	Scotland	MF/RB	1979–1995	116	5		
John McGregor	Scotland	CB	1979–1982	124	22		
John McNiven	Scotland	MF/FW	1979–1984	162	22		
Allan Rennie	Scotland	CB	1979–1984	151	0		
Gerry Crawley	Scotland	MF	1980–1983	114	19		
Lex Grant	Scotland	FW	1980–1984	123	29		
Jimmy Gilmour	Scotland	LW	1981–1984	127	36		
Ross Caven (c)	Scotland	U	1982–2002	594 ♠	103		
Stevie Ross	Scotland	GK	1982–1988	196	0		
Kenny Brannigan ♦	Scotland	CB	1983–1986	139	8		
George Crooks	Scotland	W	1983–1992	180	26		
Paul McLean	Scotland	MF/CB	1983–1988	131	7		
Derek Walker	Scotland	MF	1983–1986	106	19		
John Ward	Scotland	MF	1983–1987	106	10		
Paul McLaughlin	Scotland	LB	1984–1988	170	5		
Mark Smith	Scotland	FW	1984–1986; 1996–1997	111	7		
Jimmy Boyle	Scotland	RB	1985–1989	165	16		
Peter McNamee	Scotland	CB	1985–1998	192	5		
Paul Armstrong	Scotland	MF	1986–1990	137	8		
Graeme Elder ♦	Scotland	CB	1986–2000	415	12		
Dave Elliott	Scotland	MF/FW	1986–1990	105	13		
Keith MacKenzie	Scotland	FW	1986–1993	149	29		
Sean McEntegart	Republic of Ireland	MF	1986–1992	112	10		
Paul O'Brien	Scotland	FW/MF	1986–1990; 1997–1998	191	48		
Mike Hendry	Scotland	FW/MF	1987–1991	129	44		
James Rodden	Scotland	FW	1987–1995	147	26		
Stephen Jack	Scotland	CB	1988–1992	113	1		
Mike Monaghan	Scotland	GK	1988–1991; 1998	138	0		
John O'Brien	Scotland	MF	1989–1993	133	19		
James Chalmers	Scotland	GK	1991–1999	178	0		
David Graham	Scotland	U	1991–1999	234	19		
Steve McCormick	Scotland	FW/W	1991–1995	134	38		
John O'Neill	Scotland	W	1991–1994	107	31		
Garry Orr	Scotland	MF	1992–1998	176	19		
Ian Maxwell	Scotland	MF/CB	1993–1998	173	17		
Scott Edgar	Scotland	FW	1994–2000	154	23		
Kevin McGoldrick	Scotland	LW	1994–1998; 1999–2000	132	21		
David Arbuckle	Scotland	MF	1995–1998	110	8		
Danny Ferry	Scotland	RB/U	1995–2005	308	17		
Kevin Finlayson	Scotland	RW	1997–1999; 2000–2001	104	14	(Note: Joined on loan from Ross County in March 2000 and signed permanently in June 2000.)	
Denis Connaghan	Scotland	DF	1998–2001	116	2		
Frank Carroll	Scotland	FW	1999–2010	164	34		
Richard Sinclair	Scotland	CB	1999–2010	242	4		
Johnny Whelan	England	FW	1999–2006	178	27		

=== 21st century (2000–present) ===
Name	Nationality	Position	Queen's Park career	Appearances	Goals	Notes	Ref
Stephen Canning	Scotland	U	2000–2008	213	31		
Ross Clark	Scotland	U	2001–2006	140	12		
Tony Quinn	Scotland	U	2001–2015	391	46		
Damiano Agostini	Scotland	CB	2002–2009	176	16		
David Crawford	Scotland	GK	2003–2009	134	0		
Stuart Kettlewell	Scotland	RW	2003–2008	187	11		
Steven Reilly	Scotland	CB/MF	2003–2009	133	17		
Mark Ferry	Scotland	LW	2004–2008	156	37		
Alan Trouten	Scotland	MF/RB	2004–2008	138	33		
Paul Cairney	Scotland	MF	2005–2008; 2008–2009	107	19	(Note: Returned on loan from Partick Thistle in July 2008.)	
Michael Dunlop	Scotland	LB	2005–2008	102	4		
Paul Paton	Northern Ireland	RB	2005–2008	107	3		
James Brough	Scotland	CB	2008–2014	178	12		
Ricky Little	Scotland	CB/RB	2008; 2009–2010	159	2	(Note: Joined on loan from Partick Thistle for separate spells in September 2008 and November 2009 and signed permanently in January 2010.)	
Ian Watt	Scotland	W/FW	2008–2013	155	22		
Michael Daly	Scotland	FW	2009–2012	101	23		
Martin McBride	Scotland	FW/W	2009–2012	111	24		
David Anderson	Scotland	MF	2010–2014	132	3		
Paul Gallacher	Scotland	CB/FB	2010–2014	119	3		
Jamie Longworth	Scotland	FW	2010–2013	112	45		
Sean Burns	Scotland	MF	2011–2018	265	26		
Scott Gibson (c)	Scotland	CB	2012–2020	150	4		
Connor McVey	Scotland	MF	2012–2018	112	2	(Note: Capped by Scotland at U17 level.)	
Willie Muir	Scotland	GK	2014–2017; 2019–2022	218	0		
Paul Woods	Scotland	MF	2014–2017	122	26		
David Galt (c)	Scotland	MF	2015–2018; 2019–2021	197	25		
Louis Longridge ‡	Scotland	W/FW	2020–	110	10		
Thomas Robson ‡	England	DF/W	2020–	133	6		
