= Connaghan =

Connaghan is a surname. Notable people with the surname include:

- Denis Connaghan (1945–2024), Scottish footballer
- Denis Connaghan (footballer, born 1976) (born 1976), Scottish footballer

== See also ==
- Conaghan
- Connachan
