= Rennie =

Rennie is a given name, nickname and surname.

== People with the surname ==
- Alistair Rennie, Scottish 21st century author and musician
- Allan Rennie (born 1960), Scottish footballer
- Andy Rennie (Scottish footballer) (1901–1938), footballer with Luton Town
- Andy Rennie (New Zealand footballer), New Zealand footballer
- Bob Rennie (born 1956), Canadian real estate marketer and art collector
- Bryan Rennie (historian) (born 1954), British historian of religions
- Bryan Rennie (rugby union) (born 1984), South African rugby union player
- Callum Keith Rennie (born 1960), Canadian actor
- David Rennie (film editor), American film editor
- David Rennie (footballer) (born 1964), Scottish footballer
- Edward Rennie (1852–1927), Australian scientist
- Eliza Rennie (1813–?) Scottish romantic/Gothic short story author
- Frank Rennie (1918–1992), New Zealand soldier
- Gavin Rennie (born 1976), Zimbabwean cricketer
- Gaye Rennie (born 1949), American model
- George Rennie (agriculturalist) (1749–1828), British agriculturalist
- George Rennie (engineer) (1791–1866), British civil engineer
- George Rennie (sculptor and politician) (1801–1860), British sculptor and Member of Parliament
- Gordon Rennie, Scottish music journalist and comics writer
- Harry Rennie (1873–1954), Scottish footballer
- Iain Rennie (born 1964), New Zealand civil servant
- James Rennie (disambiguation)
- John Rennie (disambiguation)
- Martin Rennie, Scottish football manager
- Michael Rennie (1909–1971), English actor
- Nathan Rennie (born 1981), Australian cyclist
- Rhoda Rennie (1905–1963), South African swimmer
- Ross Rennie (born 1986), Scottish rugby union player
- Tom Rennie (1900–1945) British Army general killed in action
- Uriah Rennie (1959–2025), English football referee
- William Hepburn Rennie (1829–1874), British colonial official
- William Rennie (Victoria Cross) (1821–1896), Scottish recipient of the Victoria Cross
- Willie Rennie (born 1967), Scottish politician

== People with the given name ==
=== Male ===
- Rennie Airth (born 1935), South African writer
- Rennie Montague Bere (1907–1991), British mountaineer, naturalist and nature conservationist
- Rennard Rennie Davis (1941–2021), American anti-war activist, one of the Chicago Seven
- Rennie Wilbur Doane (1871–1942), American entomologist and zoologist
- Rennie Dumas (died 2017), Trinidad and Tobago politician
- Reynolds Rennie Ellis (1940–2003), Australian photographer
- Lorenzo Rennie Harris, (born 1964), dancer, choreographer, director
- Rennie Harrison, English footballer
- Rennie Hatzke (born 1955), German pop musician
- Rennie MacInnes (1870–1931), Anglican bishop
- Rennie Pilgrem, English electronic music producer
- Warren Rennie Simmons (born 1942), American football coach
- Rennie Smith (1888–1962), English politician
- Reinaldo Rennie Stennett (1949–2021), Panamanian-born baseball player

=== Female ===
- Irene Rennie Fritchie, Baroness Fritchie (born 1942), British civil servant
- Reneta Rennie Kamberova (born 1990), Bulgarian gymnast
- Renate Rennie Simson (1934–2017), American author and professor
- Rennie Sparks, American singer

== Fictional characters ==
- Rennie Wickham, the protagonist of Friday the 13th Part VIII: Jason Takes Manhattan, portrayed by Jensen Daggett

== See also ==
- Renny, another given name and surname
- Renié Conley (1901–1992), Hollywood costume designer
