= McEntegart =

McEntegart is a surname. Notable people with the surname include:

- Bryan Joseph McEntegart (1893–1968), American Catholic prelate
- Pete McEntegart, American sportswriter
- Sean McEntegart (born 1970), Irish footballer
