= Ian Robertson =

Ian Robertson may refer to:

== Sports ==
- Ian Robertson (rugby union, born 1887), Scottish international rugby union player
- Ian Robertson (Queen's Park footballer) (fl. 1964–1973), Scottish football player (Queen's Park FC)
- Ian Robertson (rugby union, born 1945), Scottish rugby union player and commentator
- Ian Robertson (Australian rules footballer) (born 1946), football commentator and former Australian rules footballer
- Ian Robertson (rugby union, born 1950) (1950–2015), South African rugby union player
- Ian Robertson (rugby union, born 1951), Australian rugby union player
- Ian Robertson (footballer, born 1966), Scottish football player (Aberdeen FC, Montrose FC)
- Ian Robertson (Gaelic footballer) (fl. 1993–2004), Irish Gaelic football player

== Others ==
- Ian Robertson, Lord Robertson (1912–2005), Senator of the College of Justice in Scotland
- Ian Robertson (British Army officer) (1913–2010), British general
- Ian Robertson (Royal Navy officer) (1922–2012), British admiral
- Ian Robertson Porteous (1930–2011), Scottish mathematician
- Ian Robertson (businessman) (born 1958), English automotive executive working for the BMW Group
- Ian Robertson (psychologist) (born 1951), Scottish professor of psychology at Trinity College, Dublin
- Ian Duncan Robertson, English engineer
