= Connachan =

Connachan is a surname. Notable people with the surname include:

- Eddie Connachan (1935–2021), Scottish football player
- James Connachan (born 1874), Scottish football player
- Jane Connachan (born 1964), Scottish professional golfer

== See also ==
- Connaghan
