= Jimmy Sinclair (footballer, born 1957) =

Scottish footballer

Personal information
- Full name: James Arthur Sinclair
- Date of birth: 31 July 1957 (age 69)
- Place of birth: Glasgow, Scotland
- Positions: Right winger; forward

Youth career
- East Kilbride KV

Senior career*
Years	Team	Apps	(Gls)
1975–1977	Queen's Park	12	(1)
1977–1978	Clyde	16	(1)
1978	Sighthill Amateurs		
1978–1981	Queen's Park	96	(3)
1981–1983	Clyde	78	(3)
1983–1985	Stirling Albion	53	(0)
1985–1987	Hamilton Academical	41	(0)
1987–1989	Queen of the South	58	(0)
1989	Stirling Albion	2	(0)
- * Club domestic league appearances and goals

James Arthur Sinclair (born 31 July 1957) is a Scottish former footballer who made over 350 appearances in the Scottish League, most notably for Queen's Park and Clyde. He also played for Queen of the South, Stirling Albion and Hamilton Academical. Sinclair later worked youth coaching with the Scottish Football Association and clubs Rangers, Queen's Park and Sunderland. He briefly served as assistant manager at Aston Villa.

== Honours ==
Queen's Park

- Scottish League Second Division: 1980–81

Clyde

- Scottish League Second Division: 1981–82

Hamilton Academical

- Scottish League First Division: 1985–86
