= John McNiven (footballer) =

Scottish footballer

Personal information
- Full name: John Martin McNiven
- Date of birth: 23 December 1962 (age 63)
- Place of birth: Glasgow, Scotland
- Position: Midfielder

Youth career
- Claremont

Senior career*
Years	Team	Apps	(Gls)
1979–1984	Queen's Park	130	(19)
1984–1986	Ayr United	76	(15)
1986–1987	Clyde	20	(3)
1987–1992	Stranraer	160	(20)
1992–1994	Alloa Athletic	69	(2)
1994–1995	Stenhousemuir	19	(0)
- * Club domestic league appearances and goals

John Martin McNiven (born 23 December 1962) is a Scottish retired football midfielder who made over 470 appearances in the Scottish League, most notably for Stranraer and Queen's Park. He also played for Ayr United, Alloa Athletic, Clyde and Stenhousemuir.

== Honours ==
Queen's Park

- Scottish League Second Division: 1980–81
