= Lex Grant =

Scottish footballer

Personal information
- Full name: Alexander Grant
- Date of birth: 27 February 1962 (age 64)
- Place of birth: Glasgow, Scotland
- Position: Forward

Youth career
- –1979: Gartcosh

Senior career*
Years	Team	Apps	(Gls)
1979–1984	Queen's Park	95	(28)
1984–1986	Ayr United	62	(10)
1986–1987	Clydebank	39	(8)
1987–1988	Falkirk	20	(0)
1988–1989	Partick Thistle	17	(1)
1989–1990	→ East Stirlingshire (loan)	5	(2)
1990–1996	Stranraer	183	(34)
- Arthurlie
- * Club domestic league appearances and goals

Alexander Grant (born 27 February 1962) is a Scottish retired football forward who made over 430 appearances in the Scottish League, most notably for Stranraer and Queen's Park. He also played for Ayr United, Clydebank, Falkirk, East Stirlingshire and Falkirk. In a 2006 Football Focus poll, Grant was voted as Stranraer's all-time cult hero.

== Honours ==
Queen's Park

- Scottish League Second Division: 1980–81

Stranraer

- Scottish League Second Division: 1993–94
