= Robert Grant =

Robert Grant may refer to:

== Politicians ==
- Robert Grant (British Columbia politician) (1854–1935), lumberman and politician in British Columbia, Canada
- Robert Grant (Kansas politician) (1948–2015)
- Sir Robert Grant (MP) (1779–1838), British politician and lawyer, hymn-writer and essayist
- Robert A. Grant (1905–1998), U.S. Representative from Indiana
- Robert E. Grant (politician) (1825-1888), American politician
- Robert Henry Grant (1860–1930), politician from Ontario, Canada
- Robert Mills Grant (1926–2012), Republican member of the Wyoming House of Representatives
- Robert Patterson Grant (1814–1892), Scottish-born merchant and political figure in Nova Scotia, Canada
- Robert Y. Grant (1819–1862), New York politician

== Sportspeople ==
- Robert Grant (cricketer) (1965–2022), English former cricketer
- Robert Grant (English footballer) (born 1990), English footballer
- Robert Grant (Scottish footballer), Scottish footballer
- Robert Grant (athlete) (born 1996), born-American Italian athlete
- Rob Grant Sr. (born 1959), English speedway rider

== Others ==
- Robert Grant (VC) (1837–1874), Victoria Cross recipient
- Robert Grant (Royal Engineers) (1837–1904), British member of the Royal Engineers
- Ramesvara Swami, born Robert Grant, former guru within the International Society of Krishna Consciousness
- Robert Grant (astronomer) (1814–1892), Scottish astronomer
- Robert Grant (Christian leader) (born 1936), radio personality, pastor
- Robert Grant (novelist) (1852–1940), American novelist and Boston judge
- Robert Edmond Grant (1793–1874), British zoologist, held the Chair of Comparative Anatomy at University College London
- Robert J. Grant (1862–1950), director of the US Mint
- Robert M. Grant (theologian) (1917–2014), American theologian and church historian
- Robert M. Grant (economist) (born 1948), American economic strategist
- Rob Grant (1955–2026), British comedy writer and television producer

== See also ==
- Bob Grant (disambiguation)
