= Hastie Weir =

Scottish footballer (1930–1999)

Personal information
- Full name: Samuel Hastie Weir
- Date of birth: 24 October 1930
- Place of birth: Whitburn, Scotland
- Date of death: 1999 (aged 68–69)
- Position: Goalkeeper

Youth career
- –1949: Baillieston
- 1949–1950: Queen's Park

Senior career*
Years	Team	Apps	(Gls)
1950–1954	Queen's Park	88	(0)
1954–1962	Motherwell	193	(0)
1964–1965	Partick Thistle	2	(0)
Total		195	(0)
- * Club domestic league appearances and goals

Samuel Hastie Weir (24 October 1930 – 1999) was a Scottish footballer, who played as a goalkeeper for Queen's Park, Motherwell and Partick Thistle in the Scottish Football League.

== Career ==
Weir played for junior club Baillieston in the late 1940s. He started his senior career with amateur side Queen's Park, where he replaced Ronnie Simpson as their regular goalkeeper in 1950. Weir attracted the attention of professional clubs with his performances, particularly for the Scotland amateur team. He moved to Motherwell in August 1954 and soon afterwards he played in the 1954 Scottish League Cup Final, which Motherwell lost 4–2 to Heart of Midlothian. The character of the Motherwell team changed significantly during Weir's eight years with the club. When he arrived, they had an ageing team that had enjoyed success in the early 1950s (winning the 1951–52 Scottish Cup) with a very strong defence. Motherwell would have been relegated in 1954–55, but were saved from that fate by the league's divisions being reconstructed.

Under the management of Bobby Ancell, Motherwell developed a very strong forward line in the late 1950s. The team were known as the Ancell Babes and featured a young Ian St John. One unusual incident involving Ancell, St John and Weir was that, in the early 1960s, most of the Motherwell team had agreed to take a bribe from gamblers to lose a match against Third Lanark. Weir found out about the fix minutes before kick-off and reacted badly, complaining to Ancell. The fix then quickly collapsed and Motherwell went on to win the match, with St John scoring a hat-trick.

Sports journalist Bob Crampsey, writing in 2000, said that this Motherwell team was "probably the finest pure footballing side that Scotland has ever produced". Motherwell were largely dedicated to attacking play, leaving gaps in defence that meant Weir had plenty of work to do in their goal. One notable achievement was to defeat Rangers four times in the 1960–61 season, including a 5–2 win at Ibrox in a 1960–61 Scottish Cup tie. Despite these plaudits, Motherwell did not win any trophies during this period. The team was soon broken up, as the star forward players were sold to finance improvements to Fir Park.

Despite becoming a professional player, Weir had continued a business career. and a move to India effectively ended his football career.

In the 1980s whilst working in the Far East, he suffered severe injuries in an industrial accident in Bangkok.
