= Conahan =

Conahan is a surname. Notable people with the surname include:

- Daniel Conahan (born 1954), American murderer, rapist, and possible serial killer
- Michael Conahan (born 1952), American J.D. and convicted racketeer
- Walter Conahan (1927–2015), American politician

== See also ==
- Conaghan
