= Ross Caven =

Scottish footballer

Personal information
- Date of birth: 4 August 1965 (age 61)
- Place of birth: Glasgow, Scotland
- Position: Defender

Youth career
- Possil Y.M.C.A.

Senior career*
Years	Team	Apps	(Gls)
1982–2002	Queen's Park	532	(96)
- * Club domestic league appearances and goals

Ross Caven (born 4 August 1965) is a Scottish former footballer who spent his entire career with amateurs Queen's Park, making over 500 league appearances.

Caven made his Scottish Football League debut for Queen's Park at the age of 17 in a 2–0 defeat by Clydebank at Kilbowie Park on 25 September 1982. He made his 500th appearance for the club when they beat Stenhousemuir in January 1999. Caven was club captain when the Spiders won their first and only trophy of his years at Hampden, the Scottish Football League Third Division championship in 1999–00. On 15 April 2000, he broke the 80-year-old Queen's Park appearance record set by J.B. McAlpine, in a 2–0 victory over Montrose at Links Park. He also scored 96 league goals for the club.

Caven retired from playing in June 2001 and joined the club's committee. The team struggled in the early part of the 2001–02 season, however, and Caven made a comeback. He finally retired at the end of that season, as Queen's Park finished 10th in the Third Division. He is still serving on the club committee.

== See also ==
- List of footballers in Scotland by number of league appearances (500+)
- List of one-club men in association football
