= Edward Scott =

Edward Scott may refer to:

== Sportspeople ==
- Edward Scott (footballer) (1897–?), Scottish footballer
- Edward Scott (sportsman) (1918–1995), English rugby union captain and cricketer
- Edward Scott (water polo) (born 1988), British water polo goalkeeper
- Ted Scott (basketball) (born 1985), American basketball player
- Teddy Scott (1929–2012), Scottish footballer and coach
- Ted Scott (caddie), American golf caddie

== Other ==
- Edward Scott (Australian politician) (1852–1920), doctor and Western Australian politician
- Edward G. Scott, former mayor of Paducah and president of the Kentucky Municipal League
- Edward J. Scott (born 1944), American soap opera producer
- Edward T. Scott (born 1965), Virginia Republican state delegate
- Edward Taylor Scott (1883–1932), editor of the Manchester Guardian
- Edward W. Scott, American businessman, co-founder of BEA Systems
- Sir Edward Scott, 2nd Baronet (1793–1852), English Whig MP
- Ted Scott (bishop) (1916–2004), bishop of the Anglican Church of Canada
- Edward Irvin Scott (1846–1931), founder of Scott Paper Company
- Edward Scott (MP for Maidstone) (died 1868), British member of parliament for Maidstone
- Edward Scott (died 1646) (1578–1646), English politician who sat in the House of Commons from 1626
- Edward Bate Scott (1822–1909), colonist of South Australia

== See also ==
- Ed Scott (disambiguation)
- Ted Scott Flying Stories, a series of juvenile aviation adventures
