= Derek Wood =

Derek Wood may refer to:

- Derek Wood (author) (1930–2003), author of The Narrow Margin and books about aviation
- Derek Wood (British Army soldier), British Army corporal killed by the Provisional Irish Republican Army
- Derek Wood (footballer) (born 1959), Scottish footballer
- Derek Wood (barrister), principal of St Hugh's College, Oxford 1991–2002
