= Thomas Sneddon =

Thomas or Tom Sneddon may refer to:

- Tom Sneddon (footballer, born 1897), Scottish footballer
- Tom Sneddon (footballer, born 1912) (1912–1983), Scottish football player and coach (Netherlands national team)
- Thomas W. Sneddon Jr. (1941–2014), American politician
