= Hosie =

Hosie is a surname. Notable people with the surname include:

- Alec Hosie (1890–1957), English cricketer
- Alexander Hosie (1853–1925), Scottish diplomat, traveller and writer, father of Alex Hosie
- Andrew Hosie, Scottish footballer
- Paul Hosie (born 1967), Australian cave diver
- Robert Hosie, Scottish footballer
- Stewart Hosie (born 1963), Scottish politician
