= Thomas Campbell (footballer) =

Scottish footballer

Personal information
- Full name: Thomas Kerr Campbell
- Date of birth: 9 June 1908
- Place of birth: Cathcart, Scotland
- Date of death: 22 July 1982 (aged 74)
- Place of death: Glasgow, Scotland
- Position: Right back

Senior career*
Years	Team	Apps	(Gls)
1927–1938	Queen's Park	276	(0)

International career
1930–1937	Scotland Amateurs	14	(0)
- * Club domestic league appearances and goals

Thomas Kerr Campbell (9 June 1908 – 22 July 1982) was a Scottish amateur footballer who made over 270 appearances as right back in the Scottish League for Queen's Park. He represented Scotland at amateur level and captained the team on one occasion.
