= Paul Armstrong (Scottish footballer) =

Scottish footballer

Personal information
- Full name: Paul Armstrong
- Date of birth: 27 October 1965 (age 61)
- Place of birth: Glasgow, Scotland
- Position: Forward

Senior career*
Years	Team	Apps	(Gls)
1983	Morton	1	(0)
–1986	Ferguslie United		
1986–1990	Queen's Park	124	(9)
1990–1991	Cork City		
1991–1995	Stirling Albion	136	(13)
- * Club domestic league appearances and goals

Paul Armstrong (born 27 October 1965) is a Scottish retired football forward who played in the Scottish League, most notably for Stirling Albion and Queen's Park.

== Career statistics ==
Appearances and goals by club, season and competition
Club	Season	League			National Cup		League Cup		Other		Total	
Club	Season	Division	Apps	Goals	Apps	Goals	Apps	Goals	Apps	Goals	Apps	Goals
Morton	1983–84	Scottish First Division	1	0	0	0	0	0	—		1	0
Queen's Park	1986–87	Scottish Second Division	33	4	1	0	1	0	1 (Note: Appearance in Glasgow Cup)	0	37	4
Queen's Park	1987–88	Scottish Second Division	30	1	1	0	1	0	1	0	33	1
Queen's Park	1988–89	Scottish Second Division	32	2	3	0	1	0	—		36	2
Queen's Park	1989–90	Scottish Second Division	29	1	1	0	2	0	—		32	1
Queen's Park	Total		124	8	6	0	5	0	2	0	137	8
Career total			125	8	6	0	5	0	2	0	138	8
