= Ed Scott =

Ed Scott may refer to:

- Ed Scott (baseball player) (1870–1933), Major League Baseball player
- Ed Scott (baseball scout) (1917–2010), American baseball scout
- Edward W. Scott, American businessman

== See also ==
- Edward Scott (disambiguation)
