= Bill Pinkerton =

Scottish footballer

Personal information
- Full name: William John Pinkerton
- Date of birth: 23 December 1932 (age 93)
- Place of birth: Cathcart, Scotland
- Position: Goalkeeper

Senior career*
Years	Team	Apps	(Gls)
1951–1962	Queen's Park	89	(0)
- * Club domestic league appearances and goals

William John Pinkerton (born 23 December 1932) was a Scottish amateur football goalkeeper who appeared in the Scottish League for Queen's Park.
