= Willie Walker (footballer, born 1906) =

Scottish footballer

Personal information
- Full name: William Ogilvie Walker
- Date of birth: 19 April 1906
- Place of birth: Partick, Scotland
- Position: Full back

Senior career*
Years	Team	Apps	(Gls)
1928–1935	Queen's Park	154	(0)

International career
1929–1932	Scotland Amateurs	4	(0)
- * Club domestic league appearances and goals

William Ogilvie Walker was a Scottish amateur footballer who made over 150 appearances as a full back in the Scottish League for Queen's Park. He represented Scotland at amateur level.
