= Bobby Cameron (goalkeeper) =

Scottish footballer

Personal information
- Full name: Robert Cameron
- Place of birth: Scotland
- Position: Goalkeeper

Senior career*
Years	Team	Apps	(Gls)
–1973	Campsie Black Watch		
1973–1977	Queen's Park	131	(0)
- Petershill
- * Club domestic league appearances and goals

Robert Cameron is a retired Scottish amateur football goalkeeper who made over 130 appearances in the Scottish League for Queen's Park.
