= Eddie Hunter (footballer, born 1943) =

Scottish footballer (1943–2025)

Personal information
- Full name: Edward Hunter
- Date of birth: 9 June 1943
- Place of birth: Springburn, Scotland
- Date of death: 13 September 2025 (aged 82)
- Positions: Wing half; centre back

Youth career
- 1959–1964: Queen's Park

Senior career*
Years	Team	Apps	(Gls)
1964–1974	Queen's Park	199	(25)

International career
1967–1972	Scotland Amateurs	15	(0)
1967	Great Britain	1	(0)

Managerial career
- 1979–1994: Queen's Park
- * Club domestic league appearances and goals

Edward Hunter (9 June 1943 – 13 September 2025) was a Scottish amateur footballer who made nearly 200 appearances in the Scottish League for Queen's Park as a wing half. He later managed the club for 15 years and in total served Queen's Park for over 30 years. Hunter represented Scotland at amateur level and made one friendly appearance for Great Britain. He died on 13 September 2025, at the age of 82.

== Managerial statistics ==
Managerial record by team and tenure
Team	From	To	Record					Ref
Team	From	To	G	W	D	L	Win %	Ref
Queen's Park	1979	10 December 1994	691	230	177	284	33.29	
Total			691	230	177	284	33.29	—

== Honours ==
Queen's Park

- Scottish League Second Division: 1980–81

== See also ==
- List of one-club men in association football
