= Alex Sheridan =

Scottish footballer

Personal information
- Full name: Alexander Sheridan
- Date of birth: 19 July 1948 (age 78)
- Place of birth: Motherwell, Scotland
- Position: Left back

Senior career*
Years	Team	Apps	(Gls)
- Kilmarnock Amateurs
1967–1970	Queen's Park	99	(3)
1970–1971	Brighton & Hove Albion	15	(2)
- Maidstone United

International career
- Scotland Schoolboys
1969–1970	Scotland Amateurs	8	(0)
- * Club domestic league appearances and goals

Alexander Sheridan (born 19 July 1948) is a Scottish retired professional footballer who played as a left back in the Scottish League for Queen's Park. He also played in the Football League for Brighton & Hove Albion. Sheridan was capped by Scotland at amateur level and captained the team in two matches.
