= Jimmy Nicholson (Scottish footballer) =

Scottish footballer

Personal information
- Full name: James Nicholson
- Date of birth: 29 July 1957 (age 69)
- Place of birth: Glasgow, Scotland
- Positions: Forward; winger

Senior career*
Years	Team	Apps	(Gls)
1975–1985	Queen's Park	245	(65)
- * Club domestic league appearances and goals

James Nicholson (born 29 July 1957) is a Scottish retired amateur footballer who made nearly 240 appearances as a forward in the Scottish League for Queen's Park. He later served as president of the club.

== Honours ==
Queen's Park

- Scottish League Second Division: 1980–81
