= Renny =

Renny is a given name and a surname.

== Given name ==
=== Men ===
- Renny Arozarena (born 1971), Cuban actor
- Renny Bartlett, Canadian film and television director
- Renny Cushing (1962–2022), American politician
- Renny Harlin (born 1959), Finnish film director, producer and screenwriter born Lauri Mauritz Harjola
- Renny Pereira (1948–1979), Kenyan field hockey player
- Renny Quow (born 1987), Trinidadian male track and field sprinter
- Renny Ribera (born 1974), Bolivian retired footballer
- Renny Smith (born 1996), English-born Austrian footballer
- Renny Vega (born 1979), Venezuelan football goalkeeper
- Renny Wilson, Canadian pop singer-songwriter, record producer and recording engineer

=== Women ===
- Renny Djajoesman, Indonesian actress
- Renny Grames, American actress
- Renny Kurnia Hadiaty (1960–2019), Indonesian ichthyologist
- Renny Lister (born 1934), British film and television actress
- Renny Martyn, American actress
- Renny Ramakers, Dutch art historian, curator, design critic, and co-founder and director of the Droog design foundation

== Stage name ==
- Renny Ottolina, stage name of Venezuelan producer and entertainer Renaldo José Ottolina Pinto (1928–1978)

== Surname ==
- George Renny (VC) (1825–1887), British Army major general and recipient of the Victoria Cross
- Henry Renny (1815–1900), British Army officer and 24th General Officer Commanding, Ceylon
- Walter Renny (died 1878), English painter and politician in colonial Australia

== Fictional characters ==
- Colonel John "Renny" Renwick, a fictional aide of Doc Savage

== See also ==
- Henry Renny-Tailyour (1849–1920), Scottish sportsman
- Rennie, another given name, nickname and surname
