= Bob Grant =

Bob Grant may refer to:

- Bob Grant (radio host) (1929–2013), New York City radio personality
- Bob Grant (actor) (1932–2003), British television comedy actor
- Bob Grant (athlete) (1934–2007), Australian Olympic athlete
- Bob Grant (rugby league) (born 1946), Australian rugby league footballer
- Bob Grant (American football) (1946–2024), American football player
- Bobby Grant (Brookside), character in the British soap opera Brookside
- Bobby Grant (footballer, born 1990), English footballer for Oldham Athletic
- Bobby Grant (footballer, born 1940) (1940–2017), Scottish footballer

== See also ==
- Robert Grant (disambiguation)
