= Thomas Smith (Scottish footballer) =

Scottish footballer

Personal information
- Full name: Thomas Greig Smith
- Date of birth: 20 March 1908
- Place of birth: Eastwood, Scotland
- Position: Goalkeeper

Senior career*
Years	Team	Apps	(Gls)
1929–1935	Queen's Park	144	(0)
1935–1936	Ayr United	18	(0)
1936–1938	St Bernard's	68	(8)

International career
1932–1937	Scotland Amateurs	11	(0)
1933	Scottish League XI	1	(0)
- * Club domestic league appearances and goals

Thomas Greig Smith (born 20 March 1908) was a Scottish amateur footballer who made over 140 appearances in the Scottish League for Queen's Park as a goalkeeper. He represented Scotland at amateur level and was selected once for the Scottish League XI in September 1933.

== Personal life ==
Smith attended Shawlands Academy.
