= Bridgeton Waverley F.C. =

Former association football club in Glasgow, Scotland

Coordinates: 55.844037°N 4.195330°W

Bridgeton Waverley
- Full name: Bridgeton Waverley Football Club
- Nickname: The Lea
- Founded: 1904
- Dissolved: 1962
- Ground: Shawfield Stadium; Barrowfield Park; New Barrowfield
- League: Scottish Junior League 1925–1927; Scottish Intermediate League 1927–1931; Central Junior League 1931–1962
Home colours

Bridgeton Waverley Football Club was a Scottish football club based in Glasgow. Originally founded in 1904, they competed in the Junior grade from 1923 until folding in 1962.

== History ==
=== Origins and early years ===
The club was initially formed as a team for former pupils of Queen Mary Street School in Bridgeton in the East End of Glasgow. The reason for choosing the title Waverley is uncertain, although there was a public house of that name situated very close to the school. They played at Juvenile level before disbanding during World War I; upon reforming they became a powerful force at that level, winning the Glasgow Juvenile Cup five times and the Scottish Juvenile Cup three times in succession between 1922 and 1924 (the only team ever to achieve this feat).

=== Juniors: at Shawfield ===
The success at Juvenile level convinced the Bridgeton Waverley committee to seek a place in the Junior leagues, having been permitted by senior club Clyde F.C. and their manager Frank Thompson to play fixtures at their Shawfield Stadium ground in Rutherglen as they sought a local home ground of their own. At that time the city of Glasgow was densely populated and heavily industrialised, and there were many clubs already established in the area. The most notable was the giants Celtic F.C., although their Irish-Catholic connections held little appeal for many of the area's residents. Junior clubs Strathclyde and Parkhead were based in the vicinity of Bridgeton, and other established clubs Glencairn, Shettleston, St Roch's, Shawfield, Baillieston, Vale of Clyde and Cambuslang Rangers were all within a few miles and could be expected to compete for players. However, despite these challenges, Waverley performed well from the outset, having joined the Second Glasgow District League for 1923–24 while also putting out a side at juvenile level. They reached the semi-finals of the most prestigious national competition, the Scottish Junior Cup, at the first attempt, eventually being eliminated by neighbours Parkhead; the match at Celtic Park attracted an attendance of 11,500, even though the senior Scottish Cup final was taking place at Hampden Park at the same time.

For 1924–25 Bridgeton moved on to the more auspicious Scottish Junior League, winning its Victory Cup knockout tournament in 1925. Due to the similarities in name and location, Bridgeton Waverley may have had some connection to a team named Rutherglen Waverley who competed in the same league in 1924–25 but did not appear again, possibly having been absorbed by the Bridgeton side.

=== Move to Barrowfield ===
In 1925–26 Bridgeton reached the final of the Scottish Junior Cup for the first time, losing 2–0 to neighbours Strathclyde in a replay at Firhill Stadium, and also won the Glasgow North-Eastern Cup. They finished in fourth place in the league, and repeated this the following season before joining the Intermediate dispute in 1927. That year saw the club move to their new home ground, Barrowfield Park, on the boundary between Bridgeton and Camlachie (this is not to be confused with Barrowfield Park which was the home of Clyde in the 19th century, both names deriving from the historic Barrowfield estate which once occupied much of the surrounding area).

During the four-year period, Waverley won the Intermediate League title in 1930–31, beating Yoker Athletic in the championship game, having lost to Clydebank Juniors in the corresponding fixture the previous year. Yoker gained some revenge by beating Waverley in the final of the 1931 Intermediate Cup (which would thereafter become the West of Scotland Cup).

Bridgeton Waverley became a member of the new Central Junior League. They reached the final of the 1931–32 Glasgow Junior Cup, losing to Shawfield, and were runners-up in that competition again in 1933–34 when Petershill prevailed. The latter campaign also saw a second Scottish Junior Cup Final appearance, with the result on this occasion a 3–1 defeat to Benburb at Ibrox.

=== New Barrowfield ===
In 1936 the long wait for a victory in a final ended at last, with the club lifting the West Of Scotland Cup after a replay against Vale of Clyde. The club was also forced to move home in 1936 when the Glasgow Corporation exercised a compulsory purchase order on Barrowfield Park in order to construct a new housing scheme (also called Barrowfield) on the land. Waverley identified a new site at Westthorn on the boundary of Parkhead, Dalmarnock and Braidfauld adjacent to Belvidere Hospital. This ground was named New Barrowfield, meaning there were three different football venues known by that name, albeit the others no longer existed. The move brought the club into even closer proximity with Strathclyde (whose Springfield Park ground was on the other side of the hospital) and Parkhead (whose Helenslea Park was just yards away across London Road). Parkhead Stadium railway station was nearby.

In 1939 a new rival emerged from within the club itself, as Dennistoun Waverley were formed as a breakaway (possibly due to the relocation - the original Barrowfield was far closer to the Dennistoun area); they set up home in the Haghill neighbourhood just over a mile from New Barrowfield and were admitted to the same league as Bridgeton just prior to World War II.

Waverley's status as a club representing the Protestant community (or at least perceived to do so) meant there were sometimes incidents involving their supporters and fans of other teams with Catholic sympathies. In 1928 a large-scale disturbance occurred at a game against Blantyre Celtic, and in 1936 there was an unsavoury incident in the Glasgow Cup semi-final between Bridgeton and St Anthony's, with fighting amongst fans in the stands at Celtic Park; Waverley won 6–0 on the day, but had used an ineligible player, and the Ants won the resulting replay.

=== Carntyne and demise ===
Bridgeton's most successful times were now behind them, and though they maintained their league status for the next 20 years, they never challenged for major honours again. In 1960, New Barrowfield was subject to another housing CPO by the city fathers and Waverley were again forced to move, this time to Carntyne Stadium a mile to the north, which was more suited to greyhound racing and speedway. By this point, many of the local Junior clubs were in financial difficulty; distractions of modern living had made attending matches less appealing, and Glasgow's housing improvement programme was in full swing, with much of the population of the crowded, substandard tenements decanted to new overspill estates on the edge of town – for East End residents this typically meant Easterhouse and Cranhill, although no new Junior teams were established in these vast schemes. Shawfield had folded in 1960, and Bridgeton Waverley followed in 1962. They would not be the last, with Parkhead ceasing operations in 1963, Strathclyde in 1965 and Dennistoun Waverley in 1968. Housing was never built on New Barrowfield as had been planned; it became the training ground for Celtic for the next 40 years and still contains football pitches. Housing now occupies the Carntyne site as well as the Dennistoun ground, the hospital and the Strathclyde ground (which formed part of the Athletes' Village for the 2014 Commonwealth Games), while the Parkhead site is a public park and the Shawfield F.C. ground was bulldozed for the M74 motorway extension.

The club was reformed on an amateur basis in 1976, going on to win tournaments in the 1990s; goalkeeper Derek Atkins played senior football for Clyde after developing at Waverley Amateurs.

== Colours ==
As a juvenile side, the club wore black and white hoops, but as a Junior side, it wore royal blue or light blue jerseys.

== Notable players ==
A number of players made the move from Waverley to senior football, with three becoming full Scottish internationals: Willie Mills, Tommy Law and Pat Quinn. The latter also represented the club in the Scotland Junior international team, along with others who did not reach the same level professionally: W. Crichton (1925), Olly McHarg (1927), Alexander Mathieson (1934), George Wilson (1936, whose 5 goals in one match and 7 overall are records) and Alf Maitland (1950).
