= Allan Rennie =

Scottish footballer

Personal information
- Full name: Allan Rennie
- Date of birth: 26 October 1960 (age 66)
- Place of birth: Glasgow, Scotland
- Position: Centre back

Youth career
- Celtic Boys Club

Senior career*
Years	Team	Apps	(Gls)
1979–1985	Queen's Park	129	(0)
1985–1987	Clydebank	4	(0)
- Kilbirnie Ladeside
1990–1991	Queen of the South	1	(0)
- * Club domestic league appearances and goals

Allan Rennie (born 26 October 1960) is a Scottish retired amateur football centre back who made over 120 appearances in the Scottish League for Queen's Park. He also played for Clydebank and Queen of the South.

== Honours ==
Queen's Park

- Scottish League Second Division: 1980–81
