= Cammy Thomson =

Scottish footballer

Personal information
- Full name: Frazer Cameron Thomson
- Date of birth: 14 June 1948
- Place of birth: Hillhead, Scotland
- Date of death: 7 June 1996 (aged 47)
- Place of death: Birmingham, England
- Position: Defender

Senior career*
Years	Team	Apps	(Gls)
- City Chambers
1970–1977	Queen's Park	152	(6)
- * Club domestic league appearances and goals

Frazer Cameron Thomson (14 June 1948 – 7 June 1996) was a Scottish amateur football defender who made over 150 appearances in the Scottish League for Queen's Park. He also captained the club.

== Personal life ==
Thomson worked for Royal Insurance. He died of a short illness in June 1996.
