= James McAlpine =

Scottish footballer

Personal information
- Full name: James Barbour McAlpine
- Date of birth: 19 October 1901
- Place of birth: London, England
- Date of death: May 1975 (aged 73)
- Place of death: Govan, Scotland
- Positions: Inside left; outside left

Senior career*
Years	Team	Apps	(Gls)
1919–1934	Queen's Park	473	(163)

International career
1928	Scottish League XI	2	(0)
1932	Scotland Amateurs	1	(0)
- * Club domestic league appearances and goals

James Barbour McAlpine (19 October 1901 – May 1975), sometimes known as J. B. McAlpine or Mutt McAlpine, was a Scottish amateur footballer who played as an inside left for Queen's Park in the Scottish Football League. He is Queen's Park's record goalscorer and second-highest appearance-maker, having scored 192 goals in 547 appearances in all competitions. He later served on the club's committee and as president. In September 2013, Queen's Park's new youth and community building at Lesser Hampden was named the "J. B. McAlpine Pavilion".

== Representative career ==
Despite being ineligible for the full Scottish international team under the rules of the time due to being born in England, McAlpine represented Scotland at amateur level. He also represented the Scottish League XI and the Glasgow FA (five appearances in the annual match against Sheffield), selection for which was not dependent on birthplace.

== Honours ==
Queen's Park

- Scottish Football League Division Two: 1922–23
