= Robert Grant (Scottish footballer) =

Scottish footballer

Personal information
- Full name: Robert S Grant
- Place of birth: Glasgow, Scotland
- Position: Wing half

Senior career*
Years	Team	Apps	(Gls)
1928–1935	Queen's Park	223	(4)

International career
1930–1935	Scotland Amateurs	7	(0)
- * Club domestic league appearances and goals

Robert S. Grant was a Scottish amateur football wing half who made over 220 appearances in the Scottish League for Queen's Park. He represented Scotland at amateur level.
