= Derek Atkins (footballer) =

Scottish footballer

Personal information
- Date of birth: 8 April 1961 (age 65)
- Place of birth: Glasgow, Scotland
- Position: Goalkeeper

Youth career
- Bridgeton Waverley Amateurs

Senior career*
Years	Team	Apps	(Gls)
1978–1983	Queen's Park	166	(0)
1983–1990	Clyde	168	(0)
1989	→ East Fife (loan)	2	(0)
1990–1991	Stranraer	1	(0)
Total		337	(0)
- * Club domestic league appearances and goals

Derek Atkins (born 8 April 1961) is a Scottish former football goalkeeper.

Atkins started his career with junior club Bridgeton Waverley before moving to Queens Park in 1978. He made 166 league appearances for the club before joining Clyde in 1983, where he stayed for 7 years.

He had short stints at East Fife and Stranraer before retiring from the senior game. He then moved to Beith Juniors where he is recognised as one of their greatest ever goalkeepers in his spell from 1990 to 1994 and was known as a penalty save specialist. He had 41 clean sheets from 140 appearances with Beith Juniors.
