= Denis Connaghan =

Scottish footballer (1945–2024)

Personal information
- Date of birth: 9 January 1945
- Place of birth: Glasgow, Scotland
- Date of death: 14 January 2024 (aged 79)
- Place of death: Paisley, Renfrewshire, Scotland
- Position: Goalkeeper

Youth career
- Glasgow United

Senior career*
Years	Team	Apps	(Gls)
1963–1964	Celtic	0	(0)
- → Yoker Athletic (loan)
–1964	Renfrew		
1964–1971	St Mirren	102	(0)
1967	→ Baltimore Bays (loan)	7	(0)
1971–1977	Celtic	32	(0)
1977–1979	Morton	41	(0)
1979–1980	Clyde	17	(0)
- Arthurlie
Total		199	(0)
- * Club domestic league appearances and goals

Denis Connaghan (9 January 1945 – 14 January 2024) was a Scottish football goalkeeper, who played for Celtic, St Mirren, Morton and Clyde.

Connaghan began his career at Celtic, but was released in 1963. After a spell in junior football with Renfrew, he joined St Mirren in 1964, where he spent seven seasons and played over 100 league games. He re-joined Celtic in 1971 in the aftermath of Celtic's shock 4–1 loss to Partick Thistle in the Scottish League Cup final. Connaghan played in Celtic's 1974 Scottish Cup Final winning side, and also in the penalty shoot-out win over Rangers in the Drybrough Cup final later that same year. However, he never fully established himself and included only 32 league games before his departure in 1977.

After brief spells at Morton and Clyde, Connaghan returned to junior football in 1980 to play for Arthurlie, and he helped them reach the Scottish Junior Cup final, where they lost 1–0 to Pollok. Following his retirement from playing, he spent many years associated with Neilston Juniors in a number of backroom roles.

== Personal life and death ==
Connaghan's son Denis also became a footballer. He attended Holyrood Secondary School.

Connaghan died on 14 January 2024. He was 79.

== Honours ==
Celtic

- Scottish League First Division: 1971–72
- Scottish Cup: 1973–74
- Drybrough Cup: 1974–75
