= Bob Crampsey =

Scottish football historian, sportswriter and broadcaster

Robert Anthony Crampsey (8 July 1930 – 27 July 2008) was a Scottish football historian, author, broadcaster and teacher, described as a "much loved Scottish cultural institution" by The Times.

== Early life and career ==
Crampsey was born in Glasgow. He was a graduate of the University of Glasgow, Associate of the Royal College of Music and former head teacher of St Ambrose High School in Coatbridge, Lanarkshire. Crampsey was 1965's Brain of Britain. He followed this up eight years later by reaching the semi-finals of Mastermind, choosing the American Civil War as his specialist subject.

He served in the Royal Air Force from 1952 to 1955.

== Broadcasting career ==
Crampsey was a widely respected pundit on BBC Radio Scotland's Sportsound from 1987 until retiring in 2001.

He was also a mainstay of STV's Scotsport. Crampsey was the author and editor of the Now You Know column of the Glasgow Evening Times, where he would answer sporting questions submitted by readers, from April 1972 until 2006.

== Honours ==
Crampsey was a pianist and was an associate of the Royal College of Music. He had a Doctorate in Sports Journalism from Stirling University.

== Personal life ==
His younger brother, Frank, was a goalkeeper for Queen's Park, the club both brothers supported. He was also a supporter of Somerset County Cricket Club.

Crampsey married Ronnie, and they had four daughters together.

Crampsey died, aged 78, on 27 July 2008 from Parkinson's disease, which he had been diagnosed with several years earlier. His funeral was held on 1 August in Holy Cross RC Church Crosshill, on the south side of Glasgow.

== Tributes ==
Former Sportsound colleague Richard Gordon said of Crampsey:

Bob had the sharpest mind of anyone I have ever known. He was a genius. It was such a joy working with him. If anything historical ever came up during a programme, Bob could describe not only the match in question, but name the referee and give the size of the crowd. He was a real football man. Once when we were on a flight to Wales to cover an Aberdeen match, I kept throwing topics at him, just to see how broad his knowledge was. He could give a discourse for 10 minutes on any subject I cared to mention.

First Minister of Scotland Alex Salmond responded to the news of Crampsey's death:

Bob Crampsey was an extraordinary man. A legend in broadcasting and in Scottish football with an encyclopaedic, unrivalled knowledge of the Scottish game. I last met him at a fundraiser and it was quite incredible that despite his recent illness his memory and grasp of Scottish football was truly outstanding. Many of us grew up with Bob so he will be greatly missed by all lovers of the game in Scotland. My sympathy goes out to his family.

== Selected bibliography ==
His most famous football related works are:

- The Game for the Game's Sake (The History of Queen's Park Football Club 1867-1967)
- The First 100 Years (The Official Centenary History of the Scottish Football League)
- Mr. Stein (his best seller)

As well as being an authority on Scottish football, Dr Crampsey wrote a number of books on non-football related subjects including:

- The Young Civilian, A Glasgow Wartime Boyhood (1987)
- The King's Grocer, Life of Sir Thomas Lipton (1995)
