= Sean McEntegart =

Irish footballer

Personal information
- Full name: Sean McEntegart
- Date of birth: 1 March 1970 (age 56)
- Place of birth: Dublin, Ireland
- Position: Midfielder

Youth career
- Clyde Boys Club

Senior career*
Years	Team	Apps	(Gls)
1986–1992	Queen's Park	100	(8)
1992–1998	Hamilton Academical	161	(9)
1998–1999	Crawley Town	37	(4)
- * Club domestic league appearances and goals

Sean McEntegart (born 1 March 1970) is an Irish retired footballer who played as a midfielder in the Scottish League for Hamilton Academical and Queen's Park.

== Honours ==
Hamilton Academical

- Scottish League Second Division second-place promotion: 1996–97
