= Danny Ferry (footballer) =

Scottish footballer

Personal information
- Date of birth: 31 January 1977 (age 49)
- Place of birth: Glasgow, Scotland
- Positions: Midfielder; full back

Team information
- Current team: Kirkintilloch Rob Roy (Manager)

Youth career
- Queen's Park Youth

Senior career*
Years	Team	Apps	(Gls)
1995–2005	Queen's Park	271	(24)
2005–2008	Dumbarton	18	(0)
2007–2012	Albion Rovers	68	(3)

Managerial career
- 2023–: Kirkintilloch Rob Roy F.C.
- * Club domestic league appearances and goals

Daniel Ferry (born 31 January 1977) is a Scottish footballer who played 'senior' for Queen's Park, Dumbarton and Albion Rovers worked as assistant manager at Kirkintilloch Rob Roy since December 2022, subsequently becoming manager in October 2023.
