= Edward Scott (footballer) =

Scottish footballer

Personal information
- Full name: Edward Roy Scott
- Date of birth: 27 January 1897
- Place of birth: Dennistoun, Scotland
- Positions: Outside forward; inside forward

Senior career*
Years	Team	Apps	(Gls)
–1920	Battlefield Juniors		
1920–1929	Queen's Park	151	(27)
- * Club domestic league appearances and goals

Edward Roy Scott was a Scottish amateur football forward who made over 150 appearances in the Scottish League for Queen's Park.
