= Stevie Ross =

Scottish footballer

Personal information
- Full name: Stephen Ross
- Date of birth: 27 January 1965 (age 61)
- Place of birth: Glasgow, Scotland
- Position: Goalkeeper

Youth career
- Celtic
- Eastercraigs

Senior career*
Years	Team	Apps	(Gls)
1983–1988	Queen's Park	173	(0)
1988–1992	Clyde	53	(0)
1992–1996	Stranraer	78	(0)
1996–1998	Albion Rovers	46	(0)
1998–1999	Partick Thistle	10	(0)
1998–1999	→ Clydebank (loan)	3	(0)
- Camelon Juniors
- * Club domestic league appearances and goals

Stephen Ross (born 27 January 1965) is a Scottish retired football goalkeeper who made over 360 appearances in the Scottish League, most notably for Queen's Park. He also played for Stranraer, Clyde, Albion Rovers, Partick Thistle and Clydebank.

== Honours ==
Stranraer

- Scottish League Second Division: 1993–94
