= Tom Sneddon (footballer, born 1897) =

Scottish footballer

Personal information
- Full name: Thomas Danks Sneddon
- Date of birth: 9 January 1897
- Place of birth: Dennistoun, Scotland
- Position: Right back

Senior career*
Years	Team	Apps	(Gls)
1921–1927	Queen's Park	77	(0)
- * Club domestic league appearances and goals

Thomas Danks Sneddon was a Scottish amateur football right back who appeared in the Scottish League for Queen's Park.
