= Bobby Dickson =

Scottish footballer (born 1955)

Personal information
- Full name: Robert Dickson
- Date of birth: 17 May 1955 (age 71)
- Place of birth: Glasgow, Scotland
- Position: Left back

Senior career*
Years	Team	Apps	(Gls)
1973–1983	Queen's Park	246	(7)
1983–1987	Clyde	102	(1)
1987	Stenhousemuir	11	(1)
1987–1988	Queen of the South	15	(0)
Total		374	(9)
- * Club domestic league appearances and goals

Bobby Dickson (born 17 May 1955 in Glasgow) is a Scottish retired football player.

Dickson began his career with Queen's Park, and spent 10 years at Hampden, before joining Glasgow neighbours Clyde in 1983. He spent four years with the Shawfield side, making over 100 appearances. He had short spells with Stenhousemuir and then Queen of the South in the era of George Cloy before retiring in 1988. He is now a technical teacher at Clydebank High School.
