= Derek Wood (footballer) =

Scottish footballer

Personal information
- Full name: Derek William Wood
- Date of birth: 12 November 1959 (age 66)
- Place of birth: Glasgow, Scotland
- Positions: Right winger; forward

Senior career*
Years	Team	Apps	(Gls)
1977–1982	Queen's Park	140	(18)
1982–1983	Clyde	4	(0)
1983	→ East Stirlingshire (loan)	3	(0)
1983	Albion Rovers	14	(1)
- * Club domestic league appearances and goals

Derek William Wood (born 12 November 1959) is a Scottish retired football right winger and forward who made over 140 appearances in the Scottish League for Queen's Park.

== Career ==
He also played for Albion Rovers, Clyde and East Stirlingshire.
