= Andrew Hosie =

Scottish footballer

Personal information
- Full name: Andrew Hosie
- Place of birth: Glasgow, Scotland
- Position: Wing half

Senior career*
Years	Team	Apps	(Gls)
1929–1942	Queen's Park	171	(4)

International career
1931–1939	Scotland Amateurs	10	(0)
- * Club domestic league appearances and goals

Andrew Hosie was a Scottish amateur footballer who made over 170 appearances as a right back in the Scottish League for Queen's Park. He represented Scotland at amateur level and captained the team on occasion.
