= James Connachan =

Scottish footballer

James Connachan (29 August 1874 – ?) was a Scottish footballer. His regular position was as a forward. He was born in Glasgow. He played for Glasgow Perthshire, Duntocher Hibernian, Celtic, Airdrieonians, Glossop North End, and Manchester United.
