= Ian Robertson (Queen's Park footballer) =

Scottish footballer

Personal information
- Full name: Ian Robertson
- Place of birth: Scotland
- Position: Wing half

Senior career*
| Years | Team | Apps | (Gls) |
| 1964–1973 | Queen's Park | 189 | (13) |
- * Club domestic league appearances and goals

Ian Robertson is a Scottish retired amateur football wing half who made over 180 appearances in the Scottish League for Queen's Park.

== Personal life ==
Robertson attended North Kelvinside School.
