= James Rennie =

James Rennie may refer to:

- James Rennie (naturalist) (1787–1867), Scottish naturalist
- James Rennie (actor) (1889–1965), Canadian-American actor
- James Rennie (golfer) (1826–1924), Scottish golfer
- James Rennie (Under the Dome), fictional character in Under the Dome
- James Rennie, Junior, fictional character in Under the Dome
