= Frank Crampsey =

Scottish footballer (1932–2022)

Personal information
- Full name: Francis Crampsey
- Date of birth: 3 May 1932
- Place of birth: Cathcart, Scotland
- Date of death: 18 November 2022 (aged 90)
- Place of death: Glasgow, Scotland
- Position: Goalkeeper

Senior career*
Years	Team	Apps	(Gls)
1953	Arbroath	1	(0)
–1954	Ashfield		
1954–1959	Queen's Park	111	(0)
1959	Falkirk	3	(0)
- * Club domestic league appearances and goals

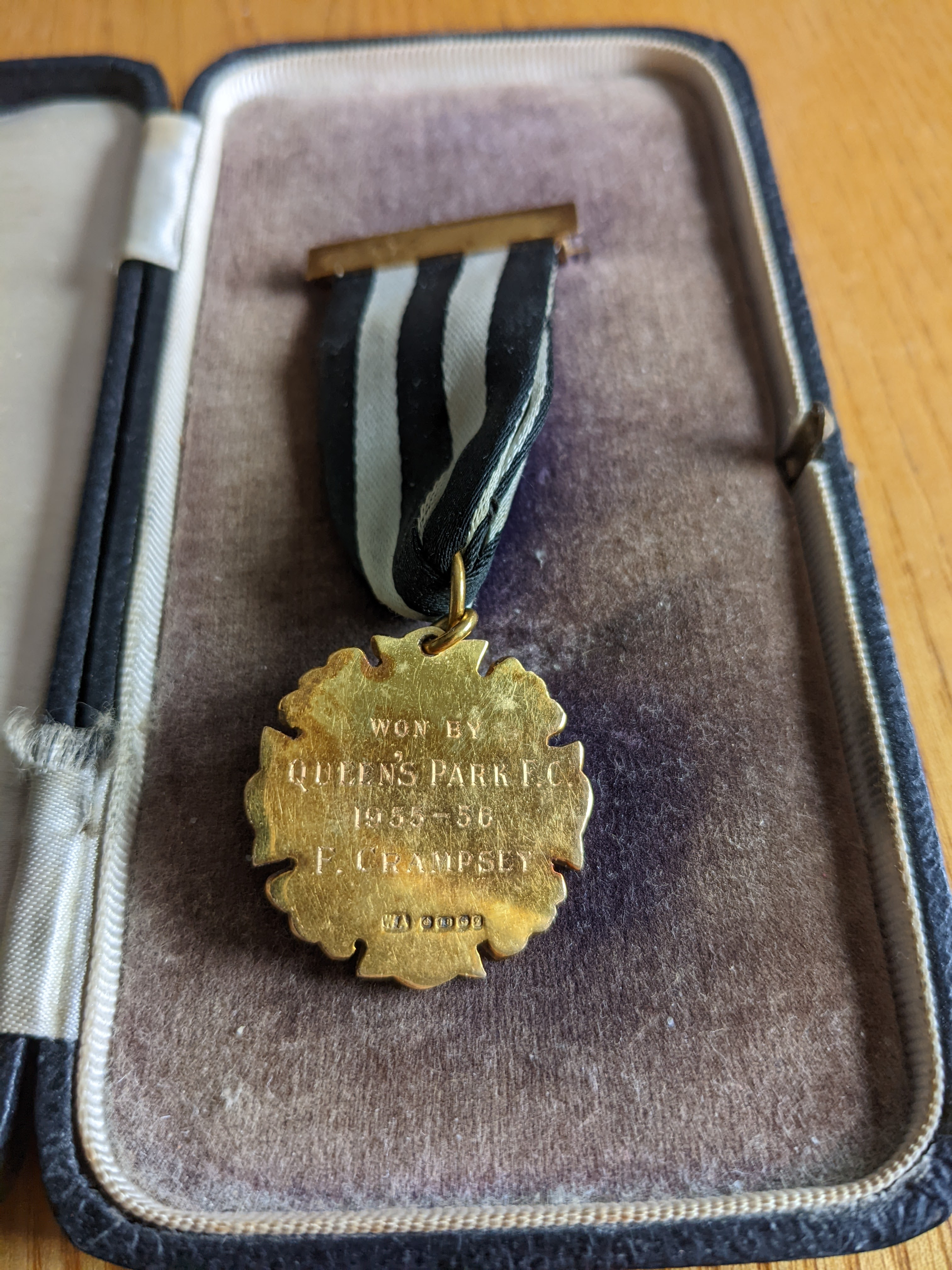
(Rear) Medal for winning the Scottish League Championship (1955–56) with Queens Park F.C.

Francis Crampsey (3 May 1932 – 18 November 2022) was a Scottish amateur football goalkeeper who made over 110 appearances in the Scottish League for Queen's Park.

== Background ==
Crampsey's older brother, Bob, was a football historian, author and broadcaster. He was also a Surveyor of Customs & Excise in the Glasgow Collection in the 1970s and 1980s.

Frank Crampsey died in Glasgow on 18 November 2022, aged 90.

== Honours ==
Queen's Park

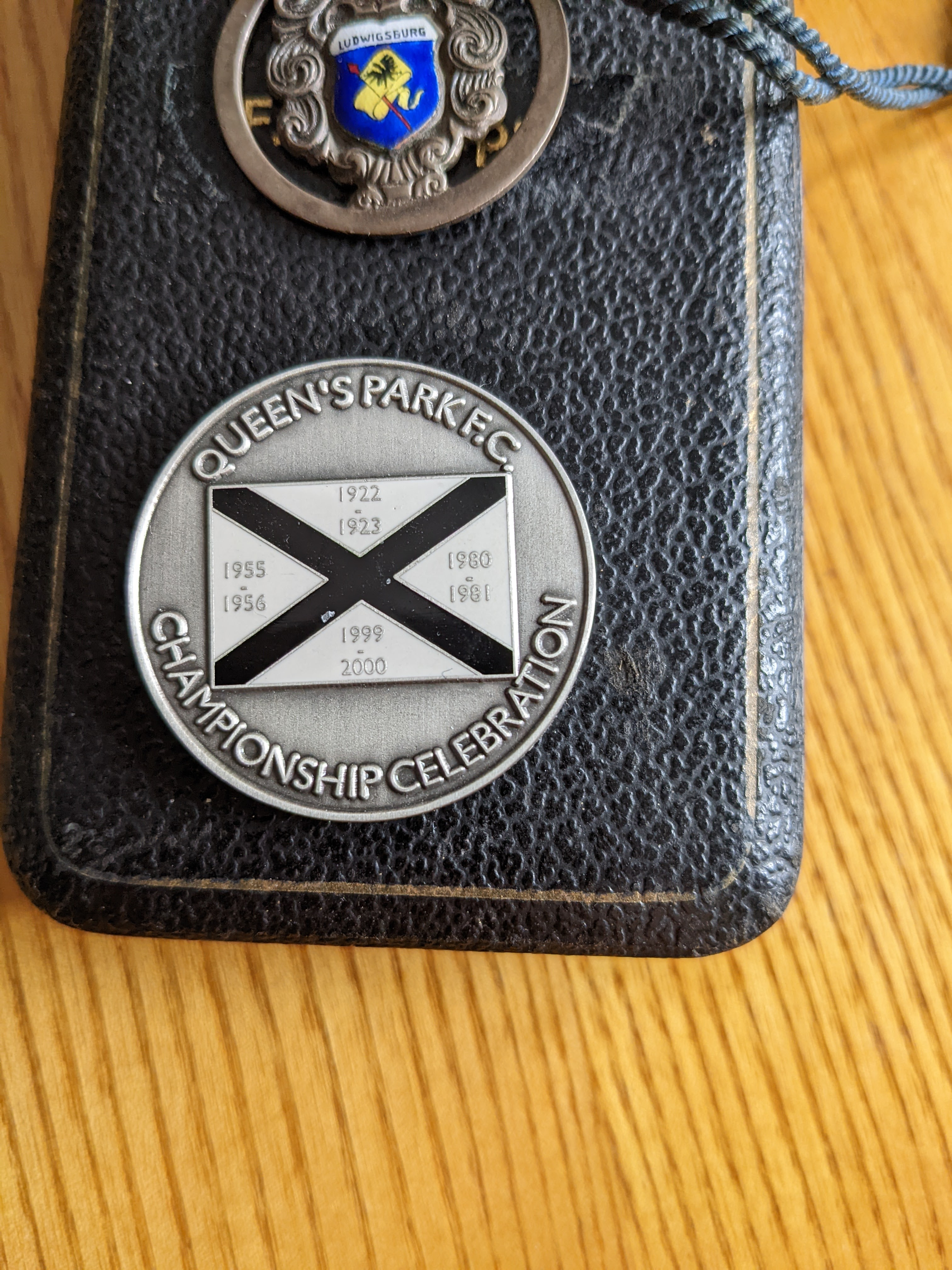
- Queens Park F.C. Medal for Champions Celebrations. (1922–23), (1955–56), (1980–81),(1999–2000)
  Scottish League Second Division: 1955–56
