= Ian Duncan Robertson =

Professor of microwave and millimetre-wave circuits

Ian Duncan Robertson from the University of Leeds, Leeds, UK was named Fellow of the Institute of Electrical and Electronics Engineers (IEEE) in 2012 "for contributions to monolithic microwave integrated circuits and millimeter-wave system-in-package technology".
