= Charlie Church =

Scottish footballer

Personal information
- Full name: Charles Church
- Date of birth: 7 July 1929
- Place of birth: Troon, Scotland
- Date of death: 11 April 2010 (aged 80)
- Place of death: Newton Mearns, Scotland
- Position: Forward

Youth career
- –1948: Queen's Park

Senior career*
Years	Team	Apps	(Gls)
1948–1961	Queen's Park	210	(57)
- * Club domestic league appearances and goals

Charles Church (7 July 1929 – 11 April 2010) was a Scottish amateur footballer who made over 200 appearances as a forward in the Scottish League for Queen's Park.

== Personal life ==
Church attended St Aloysius' College, Glasgow. He was married with two sons and a daughter and worked for his family's bookmaking company and then as a civil servant.

== Honours ==
Queen's Park

- Scottish League Second Division: 1955–56
