= John Rennie =

John Rennie is the name of the following people:

- John Rennie the Elder (1761–1821), engineer (factories, canals, design of London Bridge)
- John Rennie the Younger (1794–1874), engineer (rail lines, completion of London Bridge)
- John Rennie (naval architect) (1842–1918), naval architect
- John Rennie (MI6 officer) (1914–1981), Director of MI6
- John Rennie (soccer) (born c. 1944), American soccer coach
- John Rennie (editor) (born 1959), editor-in-chief of Scientific American, 1994–2009
- John Rennie (cricketer) (born 1970), Zimbabwean Test and ODI cricketer
- John Gillies Rennie (1904–1952), Quebec politician and educator
- John Rennie (GC) (1920–1943), British recipient of the George Cross
- John Shaw Rennie (1917–2002), Commissioner-General for United Nations Relief and Works Agency for Palestine Refugees in the Near East
- John T. Rennie (1824–1878), Scottish ship-owner
