= Pete McEntegart =

American sportswriter

Peter McEntegart, who was a columnist for si.com, the internet website for the sports magazine Sports Illustrated, wrote a daily feature called The 10 Spot.

The Ten Spot debuted during the summer of 2004, and the column originally consisted of a humorous top ten list devoted to topical happenings in the world of sports. In May, 2007, his column switched to a blog format, and some readers criticized the change in style. McEntegart announced the format change in his April 27 post: "The 10 Spot will be transformed starting on Monday into the 10 Spot Blog. The traditional 10 items-a-day format will be replaced with a free-flowing series of blog posts that will be updated throughout the day." Around the same time, the picture that accompanies his column was changed, and many readers clamored for a return of McEntegart's trademark hat. On December 5, 2008, McEntegart announced in his Ten Spot blog that he had been laid off by Sports Illustrated.

A native of New York, McEntegart graduated from Regis High School in 1987. He frequently discussed his favorite hometown sports teams, including the New York Mets and the New York Giants. Pete is also a fan of LSU's football team.

McEntegart graduated magna cum laude from Williams College in 1991 and later from the Journalism School of Columbia University. While at Williams, he worked for the Sports Information Department, and in 1991 he received the Frank Deford Award presented "annually to the top student Sports Information Assistant at Williams College."

Before writing for Sports Illustrated, McEntegart worked in New York City and London for investment banking firm Goldman Sachs. He has also written for newspapers in Virginia and Lafayette, Louisiana. At the latter paper he covered the Louisiana State University athletics program.

Additionally, in 2004, served for seven months as a juror on the fraud trial of former Tyco International executive Dennis Kozlowski. This prosecution ended in a mistrial McEntegart now lives in North Carolina.

On November 12, 2022, McEntegart was crowned "Possum King" after winning the annual Possum Scurry endurance race in Durham, NC. This was McEntegart's first competitive ultra-endurance win. McEntegart recorded his second Ultra-Endurance win in March 2026, winning Chupacabra Last PAX standing in Carolina Beach N.C.
