= Denis Connaghan (footballer, born 1976) =

Scottish footballer

Personal information
- Date of birth: 9 January 1976 (age 50)
- Place of birth: Glasgow, Scotland
- Position: Defender

Senior career*
Years	Team	Apps	(Gls)
–1997	Benburb		
1997–1998	Clydebank	2	(0)
1998–2001	Queen's Park	102	(2)
2001–2002	Partick Thistle	8	(1)
2001	→ Stenhousemuir (loan)	1	(0)
2002	Arbroath	0	(0)
2003–2007	Neilston Juniors		

Managerial career
- 2009: Neilston Juniors (caretaker)
- * Club domestic league appearances and goals

Denis C. Connaghan (born 9 January 1976) is a Scottish retired footballer who made over 100 appearances in the Scottish League for Queen's Park as a defender.

== Personal life ==
Connaghan is the son of retired footballer Denis Connaghan.

== Honours ==
Partick Thistle

- Scottish League First Division: 2001–02

Queen's Park

- Scottish League Second Division: 1999–00
