= Conaghan =

Conaghan is a surname. Notable people with this surname include:

== Politics ==
- Hugh Conaghan (1926–2020), Irish politician and transport official (Fianna Fáil TD for Donegal)
- Michael Conaghan (1944–2026), Irish politician (Labour TD for Dublin South-Central, Lord Mayor of Dublin)
- Pat Conaghan (born 1971), Australian politician

== Other fields ==
- Brian Conaghan (born 1971), Scottish author
- Joanne Conaghan, British legal scholar
- Tom Conaghan, Irish Gaelic football player and manager

== See also ==
- Harry Cunningham (activist) (born Henry Conaghan, 1891–1938) Irish-American activist
- Dorothy Conaghan Chiles (born 1930) American politician
