= 1980–81 Scottish Second Division =

Scottish Second Division
- Season: 1980–81
- Champions: Queen's Park
- Promoted: Queen's Park; Queen of the South

The 1980–81 Scottish Second Division was won by Queen's Park who, along with second placed Queen of the South, were promoted to the First Division. Stranraer finished bottom.

== Table ==
Pos	Team	Pld	W	D	L	GF	GA	GD	Pts	Promotion
1	Queen's Park (C, P)	39	16	18	5	62	43	+19	50	Promotion to the First Division
2	Queen of the South (P)	39	16	14	9	66	53	+13	46	Promotion to the First Division
3	Cowdenbeath	39	18	9	12	63	48	+15	45	
4	Brechin City	39	15	14	10	52	46	+6	44	
5	Forfar Athletic	39	17	9	13	63	57	+6	43	
6	Alloa Athletic	39	15	12	12	61	54	+7	42	
7	Montrose	39	16	8	15	66	55	+11	40	
8	Clyde	39	14	12	13	68	63	+5	40	
9	Arbroath	39	13	12	14	58	54	+4	38	
10	Stenhousemuir	39	13	11	15	63	58	+5	37	
11	East Fife	39	10	15	14	44	53	−9	35	
12	Albion Rovers	39	13	9	17	59	72	−13	35	
13	Meadowbank Thistle	39	11	7	21	42	64	−22	29	
14	Stranraer	39	7	8	24	36	83	−47	22	

Source: "1980-1981 Second Division - SPFL Archive". SPFL.
Rules for classification: 1) points; 2) goal difference; 3) number of goals scored.
(C) Champions; (P) Promoted
