= Queen's Park F.C. =

Association football club in Glasgow, Scotland

Queen's Park
- Full name: Queen's Park Football Club
- Nickname: The Spiders
- Founded: 9 July 1867; 159 years ago
- Ground: Lesser Hampden, Glasgow
- Capacity: 990
- Chairman: Alistair Marr (interim)
- General manager: David Stevenson
- Head coach: Sean Crighton
- League: Scottish Championship
- 2025–26: Scottish Championship, 6th of 10
- Website: www.queensparkfc.co.uk
Home colours	Away colours	Third colours

Queen's Park Football Club is a Scottish professional football club based in Glasgow. It is the oldest association football club in Scotland, having been founded in 1867, and is the 10th-oldest in the world. The team play in the Scottish Championship, the second tier of the Scottish football pyramid.

The club was fully amateur for the first 152 years and for many years was the only fully amateur club in the Scottish professional leagues, until its membership voted to end that status in November 2019. The club's amateur status was reflected by its Latin motto, 'Ludere Causa Ludendi' – 'To Play for the Sake of Playing'.

Queen's Park is also the only Scottish football club to have played in the English FA Cup Final, achieving this feat in both 1884 and 1885. With 10 titles, Queen's Park has won the Scottish Cup the third-most times of any club, behind only Celtic and Rangers, although their last such win was in 1893. Having also been the first winners, Queen's were the record holders of the Scottish Cup for 51 years until Celtic claimed the trophy for the 11th time in 1925.

For over a century until 2021, the club's home has been Hampden Park in south-east Glasgow, a Category 4 stadium which is also the home of the Scotland national team. The club have alternated playing games there with playing at their previous reserve and training ground adjacent to the main stadium, Lesser Hampden, with plans to fully redevelop it into a 1,774-seat stadium.

The team have played in white and black hoops as shirt colours for the vast majority of the club's existence.

== History ==
=== Beginnings (1867–68) ===
The Queen's Park Football Club was founded on 9 July 1867 with the words: "Tonight at half past eight o'clock a number of gentlemen met at No. 3 Eglinton Terrace for the purpose of forming a football club."

Gentlemen from the local YMCA took part in football matches in the local Glasgow area which gave the club its name. During the inaugural meeting, debate raged over the club's name. Proposals included: 'The Celts'; 'The Northern', and 'Morayshire'. Perhaps such choice of names suggest a Highland influence within the new club. After much deliberation, 'Queen's Park' was adopted and carried, but only by a majority of one vote. Although Queen's was not the first club in Britain, that honour going to Edinburgh's Foot-Ball Club, formed in 1824, they can certainly claim to be the first Association club in Scotland. Opposition first came in the form of a now defunct Glaswegian side called Thistle F.C. and Queen's won 2–0 on 1 August 1868.

=== Early domination (1868–1900) ===
Within the context of the emerging Association game in Scotland, the historian and broadcaster Bob Crampsey compared the role of the Queen's Park club with that of the Marylebone Cricket Club in cricket and The Royal and Ancient Golf Club of St Andrews in golf. The Glasgow club's control of the early playing rules in Scotland, early management of the Scotland national team, and instigation of the Scottish Football Association and Scottish Challenge Cup provide evidence of its status as the 'Premier' or 'Senior' club of Scotland.

On 30 November 1872, Scotland faced England at the West of Scotland Cricket Club ground at Hamilton Crescent. For the one and only time all eleven Scots players were from Queen's Park and they wore blue jerseys, as those were the current colours of Queen's. 4,000 spectators watched Scotland play with a 2–2–6 formation and England with a 1–1–8 line-up.

Queen's Park formed the Scottish Football Association on 13 March 1873, with seven other clubs. The match against Dumbreck on 25 October was the first match to be played at the first Hampden Park. It was also the first match which saw Queen's Park players wear their custom black and white hooped jerseys, which lent the club the nickname of 'The Spiders'. David Wotherspoon, a Queen's Park player and committee member, has been credited with the introduction of the black and white hoops. Most importantly, it was the first Scottish Cup tie and Scottish competitive match for the club and Queen's won 7–0. In the final, Queen's defeated Clydesdale 2–0 at Hampden.

Success in the Scottish Cup followed in the next two years with final victories over Renton and Third Lanark. In drawing 2–2 with Clydesdale in the 1875 semi-final, Queen's conceded their first ever goals. Defeat for the club was first experienced with a 2–1 defeat to Vale of Leven in the 5th round in December 1876. Third Lanark and Rangers eliminated the Spiders before Queen's reclaimed the cup in 1880 with a win over Thornliebank. Dumbarton were beaten in the final in successive years. In 1881, Queen's had to beat them twice after Dumbarton successfully appealed that the crowd at Kinning Park had encroached following a 2–1 defeat. Dumbarton got revenge in 1883 but Queen's won again in 1884 without even having to play the final after Vale of Leven refused to play on the date stipulated by the SFA.

In the early days of England's FA Cup, Scottish clubs were often invited to compete. As a result, Queen's Park twice finished runners-up in this competition, in 1884, when they lost 2–1 to Blackburn Rovers and in 1885, when they lost 2–0, again to Blackburn Rovers. 1886–87 was the last time that they entered the FA Cup competition. This remained the only instance of the same teams meeting in consecutive FA Cup finals until Manchester United and Manchester City met in both the 2023 and 2024 FA Cup finals.

Afterwards, the domination in the competition that the club had enjoyed began to lessen as more teams strengthened. The trophy was reclaimed in 1890 with a replay win over Vale of Leven and the club's 10th and final success came in 1893 with a 2–1 win over Celtic at Ibrox. In the same year, professional football was acknowledged by the SFA. Three years previously, the Scottish Football League had been formed but Queen's declined to join, stressing their amateur principles. Queen's Park joined the Scottish League in 1900 and took part in the 1900–01 season (being added directly to the top division rather than the lower division).

Nevertheless, the Queen's players of the time were held in high regard throughout the country and some are still remembered today. Charles Campbell won eight Scottish Cup winners medals with Queen's and earned 13 Scotland caps. Wattie Arnott was a near ever-present in the successful teams of the 1880s. Robert Smyth McColl scored a remarkable number of goals for Queen's and soon moved on to Newcastle United and Rangers. In an unprecedented move, he returned to Queen's and scored six goals in his final match. Andrew Watson was the first black football player in Britain. He won three Scotland caps and starred in one of the club's earliest sides. J.A.H Catton, a notable sports editor, named Watson in his all-time Scotland team in 1926.

==== Pioneers of the modern passing game ====
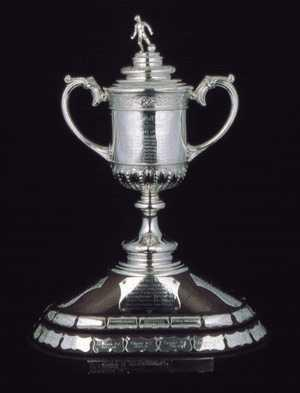
Queen's Park have won the Scottish Cup on ten occasions, third on the all-time list of winners

Queen's Park are accredited with introducing a collective and 'scientific' form of team based passing which would become known as 'combination' football. Although rudimentary forms of passing existed prior to 1872, and Queen's themselves appear to have indulged in this, the combination game as a systematic form of passing was being played by the club at the time of the first official international match between Scotland and England. This changed the nature of the Association game as the culture in London at this time was largely one of dribbling and 'backing up'. Scotland's promotion of the combination game would ultimately lead to the introduction of professionalism in England in 1885, due to the large importation of Scottish players (known as Scotch Professors) into the midlands and the north of England.

During the late 1860s and early 1870s the club practised regularly and experimented with playing styles. According to Richard Robinson, who wrote the club's official 50th anniversary history,

Mondays, Wednesdays and Saturdays were fixed upon as the nights for play... Whoever selected the teams on practising nights had the power to place their men on the field, or appoint substitutes, and the players shall be bound to adhere to their instructions.

Robinson also explains the means by which the passing game was developed,

The club... never neglected practice, and this practice was indulged in systematically. Sides were arranged— North v. South of Eglinton Toll, Reds v. Blues, Light v. Heavy Weights, President's Team v. J. Smith's Team (a series of six games), and Clerks v. The Field, etc. In these games the dribbling and passing, which raised the Scottish game to the level of a fine art, were developed. Dribbling was a characteristic of English play, and it was not until very much later that the Southerners came to see that the principles laid down in the Queen's Park method of transference of the ball, accompanied by strong backing up, were those which got the most out of a team. Combination was the chief characteristic of the Queen's Park play.

Queen's were certainly playing a passing game by the time of their FA Cup tie (March 1872) with Wanderers, the most successful English side of the 1870s. Of the Queen's Park team, The Field magazine notes that, "They dribble little and usually convey the ball by a series of long kicks, combined with a judicious plan of passing on." It is the first official international match, played on 30 November 1872, where the first reference is given to their style as a culture of passing. The Graphic, a London-based weekly illustrated newspaper, provides the following insight into the game,

Individual skill was generally on England's side, the dribbling of Kirke-Smith, Brockbank and Ottaway being very fine, while Welch, half-back, showed himself a safe and good kick. The Southrons, however, did not play to each other so well as their opponents, who seem to be adepts in passing the ball.

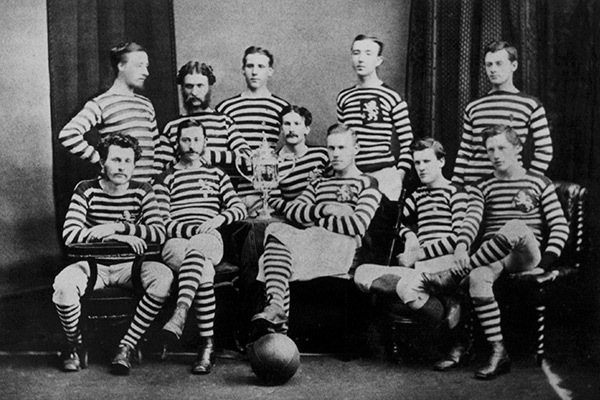
The 1874 Queen's Park team that won the Scottish Cup

The Glasgow Herald report on the game makes the following observation of the differences between both sides,

The Englishmen had all the advantage of weight, their average being about two stones heavier than the Scotchmen and they had also the advantage in pace. The strong point of the home club was that they played excellently well together.

The newspaper article which features Queen's Park's 5–0 victory over Wanderers in October 1875 (a match in which C.W. Alcock and the Anglo Scot A.F. Kinnaird played in for Wanderers) gives a concise description of the style of combination adopted by the club, particularly in the section which describes the second and third goals,

After a "hand" within thirty yards of the Wanderers' lines, Weir got possession, and, successfully charging the English forwards, passed it on to Herriot, who in turn placed it to Campbell, who by a well judged kick dropped the ball just below the bar, thus securing another goal for the Scotsmen in sixteen minutes. No sooner had the English captain started the ball than Herriot, Weir and Lawrie, by neat passing sent it back, and after the backs and half backs had shown good play, the two M'Neills brought it along the left side, and passing it to Lawrie, the latter made a shot for goal, but the ball passed just outside the goal post. The play was now in the centre, the Queen's Park men dribbling and passing, while their opponents indulged chiefly in heavy kicking. In 33 minutes from the commencement of operations H. M'Neill, obtaining possession, kicked the ball to Herriot, who unselfishly serving it to Lawrie, the latter again made a shot for goal, this time with more success, as the ball, passing above the goalkeeper's head, went clean through thus obtaining the third goal.

==== Queen's Park in the Football Association ====
In 1870 Queen's joined The Football Association which is based in London – the only football governing body in existence at the time. Their main attraction was to the new Challenge Cup and contributions were made to pay for the trophy. Queen's reached the first semi-finals in 1872 but had to withdraw due to lack of funds after drawing their first competitive match 0–0 with The Wanderers at the Kennington Oval. Financial constraints meant that Queen's played little part in the competition until 1884 where they stormed to the final before losing 2–1 to Blackburn Rovers at The Oval. Another loss to Blackburn the following year was the closest Queen's got to winning the English trophy. In 1887, Scottish clubs were banned from entering by the Scottish Football Association. Although the solid crossbar first appeared in the Sheffield Rules code, Queen's Park was responsible for its use in association football when the club successfully put forward a motion for its introduction at a meeting of the Football Association in 1875.

Queen's Park were invited to play in the annual Sheriff of London Charity Shield, a precursor of the FA Community Shield in 1899 which pitted the best amateur and professional sides of the season against each other. They would play the Football League First Division champions Aston Villa. The amateur side was usually represented by Corinthian, however Queen's Park had defeated them 4–1 at Hampden Park earlier that year and the trophy committee decided that they deserved the honour. The match ended in a scoreless draw which saw the sides share the honour, holding the trophy for six months each.

=== Queen's in the Scottish League top flight (1900–58) ===
However, as the 20th century drew nearer, Queen's found themselves playing in only cup competitions and the Glasgow League. A remarkable run to the 1900 Scottish Cup final saw Queen's only narrowly lose 4–3 to Celtic. The previous 25 years had Queen's achieve great success in cup competition but after ten years of resistance they finally took the big step to the Scottish League, first entering Division One in 1900–01.

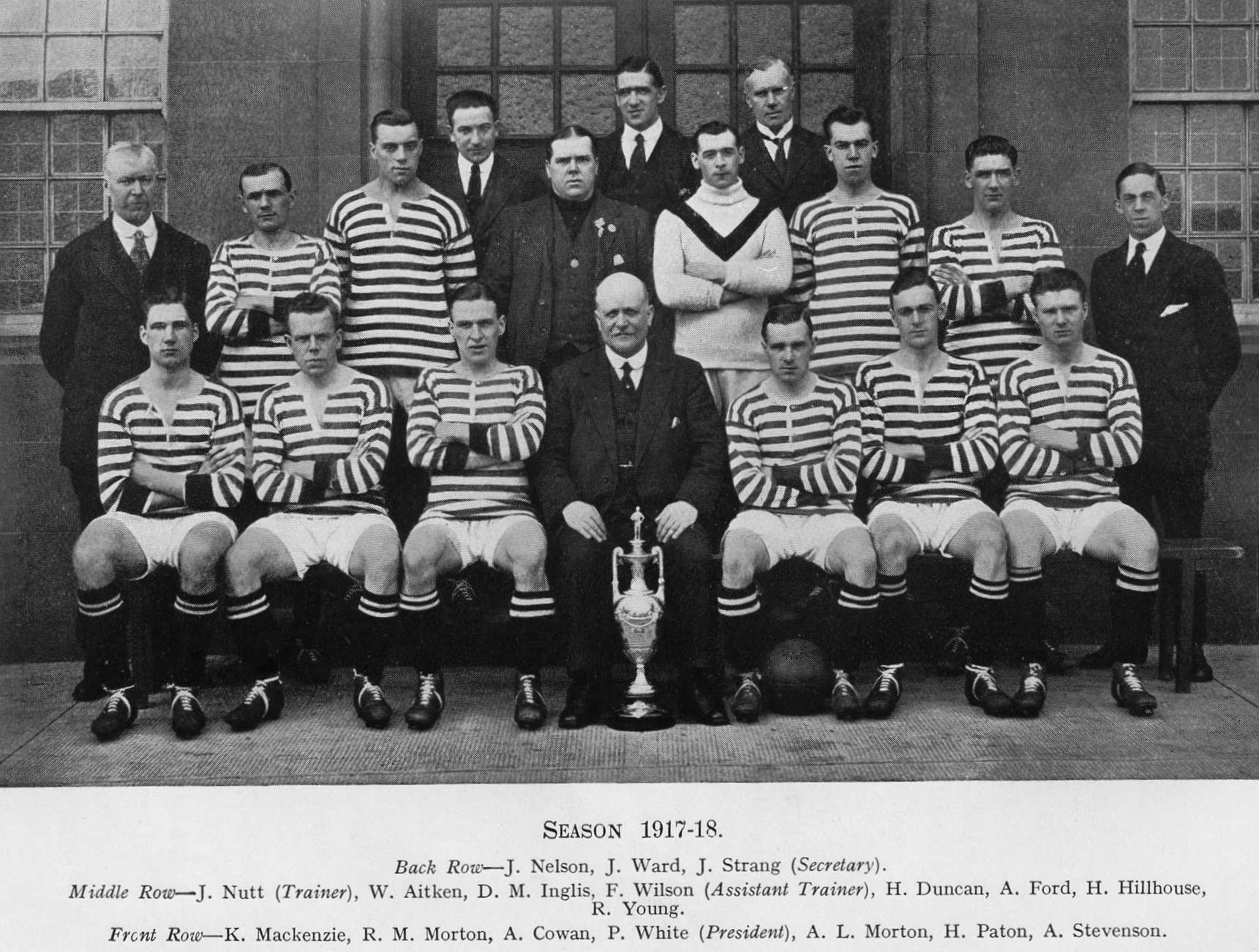
The 1917–18 team

Queen's struggled with top-flight football and the professional sides which surrounded them. An early high-point was a 1–0 victory over Celtic at the opening of the new Hampden Park in 1903. By previous standards, however, unspectacular seasons followed and the club even finished in the relegation zone on five occasions. Queen's were spared by vote until 1922 when, after a few solid seasons, the team were eventually relegated in second-last place. Queen's bounced back immediately, winning Division Two at the first attempt. In a league season of 24 victories and only five defeats, the Spiders even managed a 4–3 win over Celtic in the Glasgow Cup, with James McAlpine scoring a hat-trick. McAlpine's fine play inspired Queen's to their greatest ever placing in the Scottish League, when they finished 5th in Division One in 1929. He would go on to set a goal scoring record for the club and his appearance record was only beaten by Ross Caven at the turn of the next century. In 1928, the same side also came closest to any Spiders team since 1900 to winning the Scottish Cup but lost 2–1 to Celtic in the semi-finals.

Chart of yearly table positions of Queen's Park in the League.

World War II helped Queen's stay in the top league a little longer as at the end of 1938–39 season, the club were relegated. Six seasons in the Southern League followed, and it gave youth and many new players a chance to develop at Hampden as the players of before left to serve their country. Bobby Brown was one such player who started at Queen's in 1939 but left in 1941 to serve as a pilot. When he returned at the end of the War, he found his goalkeeping position occupied by a teenage Ronnie Simpson who had made his debut at the age of 14. Although obviously a bleak time for everyone, this period gave many footballers at Queen's Park an opportunity to play at the highest level under little pressure.

When War ended, Queen's joined the Scottish 'A' Division, where they stayed for three seasons, before relegation in 1948. The next few years were erratic but gradually a great team came together. Fourth place in 1954–55 was followed by first in 1955–56. The side was composed of players familiar with each other and the success was a reward for such longstanding legends as Charlie Church and Bert Cromar. Cromar played in every league game, as did goalkeeper Frank Crampsey (brother of journalist and Queen's fan Bob), who kept 17 clean sheets. Queen's only lasted two seasons in the top division and were relegated in 1958, having only won four league games all season, and losing heavily on many occasions.

=== League reconstruction (1958–1994) ===
With stalwarts such as Cromar, Hastie and Omand all having moved on, the mid-1960s saw a new side which promised much. Future Scotland Internationalist Bobby Clark played in goal in 1964–65 season as Queen's finished fourth. That finish was again achieved in 1968, with Queen's winning 20 games (eight in succession towards the end) and scoring 76 goals. It was a formidable side which featured established Spiders Malky Mackay Sr. (the father of Malky Mackay), Peter Buchanan and Eddie Hunter. Ultimately, no success was gained, however, and as that side splintered, the club toiled until the mid-70s.

The 1975–76 season saw the reconstruction of the Scottish Leagues and Queen's entered the Second Division (third tier). Coinciding with this, Queen's appointed a head coach for the first time. Davie McParland led Queen's to 4th place but left at the end of the season to join Partick Thistle. Joe Gilroy was his successor and Queen's finished 5th, 7th and 13th under his guidance before his departure at the end of 1978–79.

Former player Eddie Hunter took charge and within two seasons, Queen's had been promoted as 1980–81 champions. The talent in the side was obvious. Derek Atkins was an ever-present in goal, John McGregor a high scoring defender and Jimmy Nicholson and Gerry McCoy netted a combined tally of 28 goals. Much of the side was inexperienced, with full-back Bobby Dickson one of the few who had been a mainstay in previous years. After a highly respectable finish of 8th the following season, Queen's finished bottom and were relegated in 1983. The main reason for this was the loss of some of the best players who had won promotion. In particular, John McGregor and Alan Irvine departed, leaving for Liverpool and Everton respectively. During the same season, Queen's lost 2–1 to Rangers at Hampden in the Scottish Cup quarter-finals.

Recovery took a while but eventually a good side featuring Stevie Ross, Kenny Brannigan, Ian McCall and Ross Caven finished 4th in 1985–86 – winning three more games than the Championship side of 1981. Queen's lost narrowly by 2–1 at Celtic Park in the Fourth round of the Scottish Cup in the February 1986.

1987–88 was a further improvement but 21 victories was only enough for 3rd place. 1990–91 was another season of frustration as Queen's squandered a chance for promotion after having been in contention for so long and finished 5th, only four points behind 2nd place Montrose.

=== Modern history (1994–2019) ===
Eddie Hunter was fired as the club's manager in December 1994 as Queen's failed to recapture the achievements of the previous decade. Former Alloa Athletic manager Hugh McCann was appointed as his successor but after an 8th-place finish in the new 10 team Third Division, he left the club. Graeme Elder took over as player/coach but the team continued their disappointing run and he eventually resigned. A happier memory from this time was the 5–1 demolition of Albion Rovers at Hampden in August 1997, the opposition finishing the match with seven players. There was also an incredible 5–5 draw at East Fife in Hunter's last season, with fan favourite Brian McPhee scoring four goals for Queen's.

==== Constitutional change ====
The club's constitution was changed prior to the appointment of the next manager, which meant that Queen's could sign former professionals provided they were not paid by the club. Former Dundee manager John McCormack was unveiled in July 1998 as the new head coach. Like Eddie Hunter, McCormack succeeded in winning the league after just two seasons. The new boss used the new legislation to great effect and even persuaded the club to allow the loaning of professionals. The ex-pros and the committed amateurs combined to give Queen's a superb start to the league season and it was November before defeat was felt. A 4–0 loss to challengers Forfar Athletic towards the end of the season was quickly forgotten as Queen's won their last five matches, clinching the Championship at Cowdenbeath on the final day of 1999–2000. The addition of ex-pros such as Neil Inglis, Paul Martin, Graham Connell and Johnny Whelan helped. The late loan signing of Paul Walker from Stranraer also proved to be very shrewd as he scored two winning goals in the final run-in. After nearly 20 years of service to the club, Ross Caven won a Championship medal and there was also success for the hard-working Danny Ferry who had been with Queen's through the lean spells of the 90s.

==== Promotions and relegations ====
Having won promotion, the Spiders only lasted one season in the Second Division. A good start was made but after the New Year results became increasingly hard to come by and Queen's were relegated on the last day on goal difference. The following season featured a new and largely inexperienced team and Queen's did not win a match until November. There was a period of revival for the team and some great results were achieved, but the poor start meant that Queen's finished bottom of the Third Division, and thus, bottom of Scottish football, for the first time in their history. The start to the following season was unspectacular but the team managed to get to the semi-finals of the Challenge Cup before losing 4–3 to Brechin City at Hampden. Months before, McCormack had been made part-time by Queen's. When Morton made an approach for his services in November 2002, he left to take the full-time position.

After a lengthy wait, former player Kenny Brannigan was announced as the new manager of Queen's Park in January 2003. His short term at the club was unsuccessful and only a couple of memorable results were achieved, notably a 2–1 win over Inverness Caledonian Thistle in the League Cup. A reasonable start to season 2004–05 came to a halt when Brannigan physically confronted a player and a supporter during a match against Elgin City. Queen's lost the match 1–0 and Brannigan lost his job.

Billy Stark was installed as Kenny Brannigan's replacement in August 2004 and the season ended with Queen's in 4th place. Inconsistency prevented Queen's from reaching the first ever play-offs the following season but in 2006–07 the Spiders were promoted. Not unlike the successful side of 1981, there were few veterans, and the team mostly consisted of young players with little or no experience of football away from Queen's Park. In August 2006, Queen's defeated SPL side Aberdeen in a League Cup penalty shoot-out to record one of their greatest ever victories. League form dramatically improved after the New Year as only one home match was lost in the second half of the season. Queen's went on a run of eight consecutive victories, during which goalkeeper David Crawford set a new club record by keeping seven successive shut-outs. Queen's finished 3rd in the league, acquiring only one less point than the side which had won the Championship 7 years earlier. Promotion was achieved via the play-offs. Queen's defeated Arbroath in the semi-finals 4–1 on aggregate and then East Fife in the final 7–2 on aggregate. Richard Sinclair and Frankie Carroll became the first players in the club's history to win promotion on more than one occasion. Queen's Park's cavalier playing style was one which was lauded by coaches from opposition sides during the season and they were acknowledged as being well worthy of their promotion.

Combining the end of the promotion season and the start of 2007–08, Queen's managed 11 consecutive victories (8 league wins) in all competition. Although Billy Stark had signed a new contract in the summer of 2007, he left midway through the following season to take the managerial post of the Scotland under-21s.

==== Gardner Speirs and young talent ====
Stark was replaced in February 2008 by Gardner Speirs who secured safety from relegation and an 8th-place finish. Queen's lost many talented players in the summer of 2008 to paying clubs but only narrowly lost 2–1 to Celtic in the Scottish Cup fifth round in February 2009.

After finishing 9th in the Second Division in season 2008–09 and then being defeated in the end-of-season play-off semi-finals (losing 1–2 on aggregate v Stenhousemuir), Queen's Park were relegated to the Third Division. In January 2010, David Murray scored the Spiders 3000th competitive home goal.

Despite poor starts in their last two Third Division campaigns, on both occasions Queen's Park did enough to qualify for the end of season playoffs. They lost at the semi-final stage in both ties, firstly to Arbroath and then to Albion Rovers. In season 2012–13, faced with greater public scrutiny due to Rangers being accepted into the bottom tier, Queen's had their best season in years, finishing third and playing attractive attacking football. They failed to achieve promotion in the play-offs, losing to Peterhead, and the side, which contained players such as Andrew Robertson, Lawrence Shankland, Aidan Connolly, Paul McGinn and Blair Spittal was broken up in the close season.

In season 2014–15 Queen's Park finished 2nd and qualified for the Scottish league one playoffs. In the first leg, the Spiders drew with Arbroath 2–2 at Gayfield Park before defeating them in the home leg thanks to a 118th minute winner from Queen's defender Tony Quinn. In the second leg, which would determine the winner of the playoff and subsequent promotion, Queen's Park were defeated 1–0 by Stenhousemuir in the first leg at Hampden Park. In the away leg at Ochilview Park, Queen's Park would draw 1–1 with the Warriors, meaning Queen's Park would play League Two football the following season.

==== 150th anniversary ====
After finishing fourth in the 2015–16 league season, they were promoted after beating Clyde in the playoff final. Queen's Park celebrated their 150th birthday on 9 July 2017, with events held to mark the occasion. Following a ninth-place finish in 2017–18, they were relegated to Scottish League Two at the end of the season after a 3–2 aggregate loss to Stenhousemuir in the play-offs.

In the 2018–19 Scottish Challenge Cup, the Spiders recorded a 4–2 penalty win over Champions League regulars, The New Saints of the Welsh Premier League in the second round of the competition.

=== Queen's turn professional (2019–present) ===
==== Back to back promotions, return to the second tier ====
A major change to the club's constitution was proposed in 2019, with its members asked if they wished to end amateur status and to allow the hiring of professional players. Part of the motivation for the proposal was that several good players had been lost without the club receiving any compensation due to its status. The club's members voted to move to professional status following a motion on 14 November 2019. 91% of QPFC members elected to turn professional, enabling the club to sign players to longer-term contracts and collect transfer fees.

Former Dundee United and Falkirk coach Ray McKinnon was appointed as the club's new head coach in January 2020. He became the first manager of Queen's Park since the 1980s to secure two wins in his first two matches in charge, before the league two season was ended prematurely due to the COVID-19 pandemic. In the summer of 2020, Queen's Park signed many professional players from higher placed Scottish teams, including former Dundee United striker Simon Murray, and the team went on to win the 2020–21 Scottish League Two title and gain promotion to League One. On 12 January 2021, former Motherwell and Hibernian CEO Leeann Dempster was appointed as the club's new chief executive. Dempster announced she would be stepping down from her role in January 2024. Ray McKinnon would leave his role as head coach at the end of the 2020–21 season. He was replaced by his assistant manager Laurie Ellis in the close season but Ellis would be relieved of his duties in December 2021 following a downturn in form.

Owen Coyle was announced as the new manager of Queen's Park in March 2022. Queen's Park were promoted to the 2022–23 Scottish Championship after beating Dunfermline Athletic 1–0 in the play–off semi-final and then beating Airdrieonians 3–2 in the final of the Championship play-off, thus securing back to back promotions from the fourth to the second tier of Scottish football.

In their first season back in the second tier, Queen's narrowly missed out on automatic promotion to the Scottish Premiership after the loss of Simon Murray in the January window, the league's top-scorer to that point, and were beaten in the Premiership play-offs by city rivals Partick Thistle. Owen Coyle announced he would be stepping down from his role shortly thereafter.

In June 2023, in what was hailed as an ambitious move by the club, Queen's Park announced that former Ajax and Anderlecht coach Robin Veldman had been appointed as their new head coach. After a slump in form following a promising start to the league campaign, Veldman left his position on 9 December 2023. He was replaced by former St Johnstone manager Callum Davidson, who was announced as the club's new head coach in January 2024. He would swiftly make multiple high profile signings such as Danny Wilson and Cillian Sheridan, ensuring that Queen's Park finished the 2023–24 Scottish Championship season in 8th place, narrowly avoiding a relegation play-off spot in a 2–0 win over Airdrieonians at Hampden Park to conclude a difficult season.

On 27 July 2024, Queen's Park progressed out of the Scottish League Cup group stage for the first time in the new structure after beating Kelty Hearts 6–0. On 17 August 2024 Queen's travelled to Pittodrie Stadium to face Aberdeen in the cup's second round where they would narrowly lose 1–0 in added time.

On 9 February 2025, Queen's Park defeated Rangers 1–0 at Ibrox Stadium in the fifth round of the Scottish Cup, a result that was later described as "One of the greatest shocks in Scottish football history". This result set Queen's up for their first Scottish Cup quarter final in 40 years against Aberdeen, losing 4–1 with Zak Rudden scoring the side's only goal.

On 15 May 2025, the club announced interim and former youth team manager Sean Crighton as their new first team head coach. Crighton would make a number of signings despite a lower budget going into the 2025–26 campaign. Signings such as Euan Murray, Josh Fowler, returning spiders Aidan Connolly, and Michael Ruth would make an impact throughout a season in which many had the Spiders as favourites for relegation. On 18 April 2026, following a 0–0 draw with Morton at Cappielow, Queen's Park secured their championship place for 2026–27, with head coach Crighton citing Spiders' goalkeeper Calum Ferrie as the hero that day.

== Rivals and friendships ==
Despite being located midway between Celtic and Rangers, Queen's Park's former resistance to professionalism resulted in the club not competing in the same division as those teams for long periods of time, and thus turning to rivals in lower divisions, such as Partick Thistle, Clyde, Albion Rovers and Third Lanark (the latter being the Spiders' closest neighbours until they went defunct in 1967).

Since the mid-2000s, Queen's Park supporters have had a strong relationship with German Oberliga Westfalen side SG Wattenscheid 09 due to the similarities between the two clubs, including the traditional black and white playing colours of each club's home jerseys.

=== Supporters ===
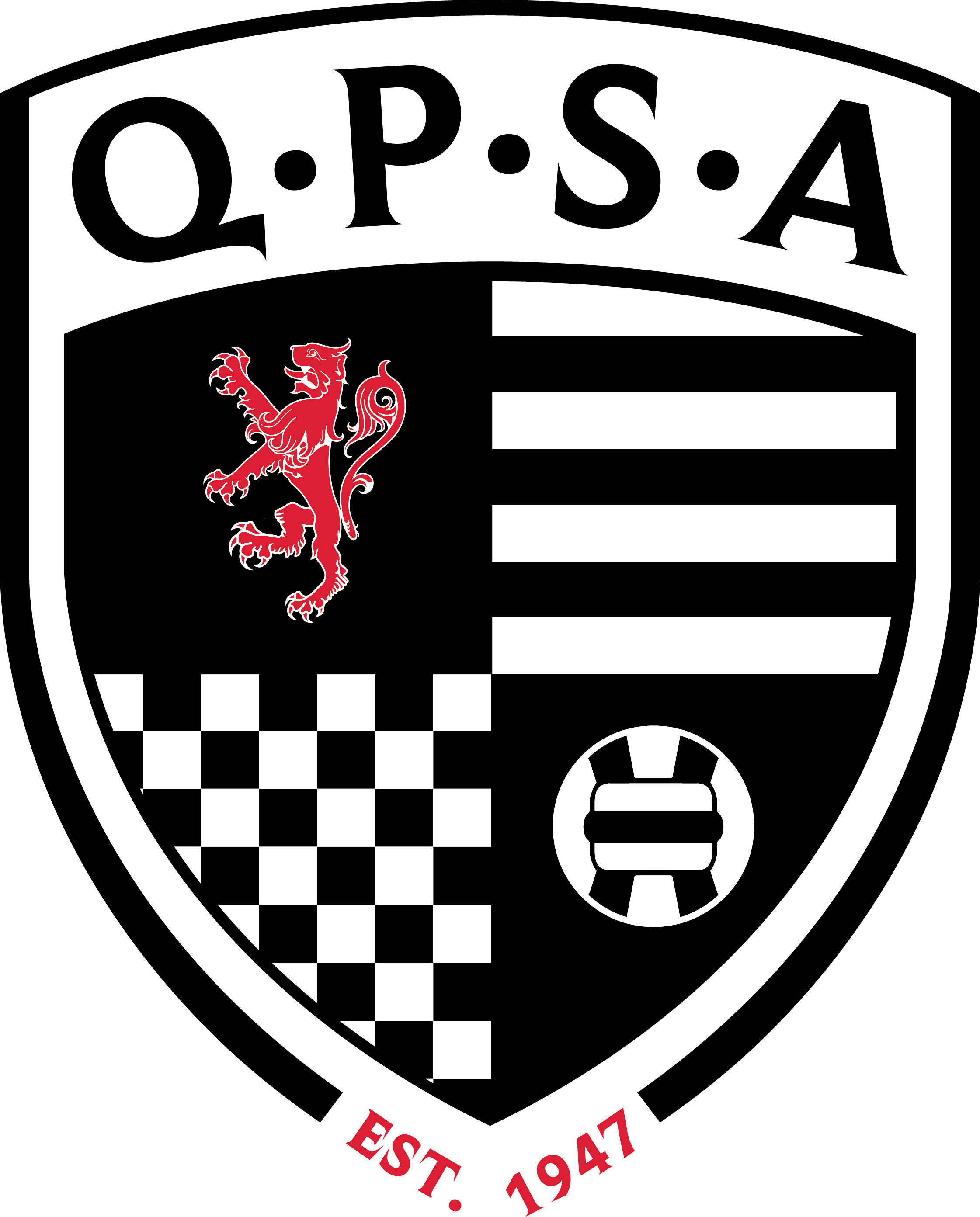
The QPSA's logo.

Queen's Park have had a supporters' association since 1947 and currently have members around the world in dozens of countries. The Queen's Park Supporters' Association (QPSA) organise bus travel for away fixtures, organise fundraisers, help community organisations, sell unofficial merchandise, organise quiz nights and other social gatherings and publish monthly newsletters to their members. The QPSA are also vital in liaising between the club and the supporters.

Queen's Parks more vocal supporters go by the alias of the 'Irn Bru Firm' due to the club's previous long standing connection to the soft drink. The 'Irn Bru Firm' used to congregate at the back of section P2 in Hampden Park and now in section 1 of Lesser Hampden where they will stand and sing traditional chants. At away games, the 'Irn Bru Firm' will stand, chant, clap and hang flags with Queen's Park related text or images.

== Kit history ==
Year	Manufacturer	Sponsor
1867–1977	Own Brand	N/A
1977–1989	Bukta	Granyte Paints (1988–89)
1989–1994	Umbro	N/A
1994–2001	Le Coq Sportif	Irn-Bru (1996–2022)
2001–2003	Fila	Irn-Bru (1996–2022)
2003–2006	Diadora	Irn-Bru (1996–2022)
2006–2013	Joma	Irn-Bru (1996–2022)
2013–2020	Under Armour	Irn-Bru (1996–2022)
2020–2022	Admiral	Irn-Bru (1996–2022)
2022–2023	Macron	Scotts
2023–	Adidas	City Facilities Management

== Stadium ==
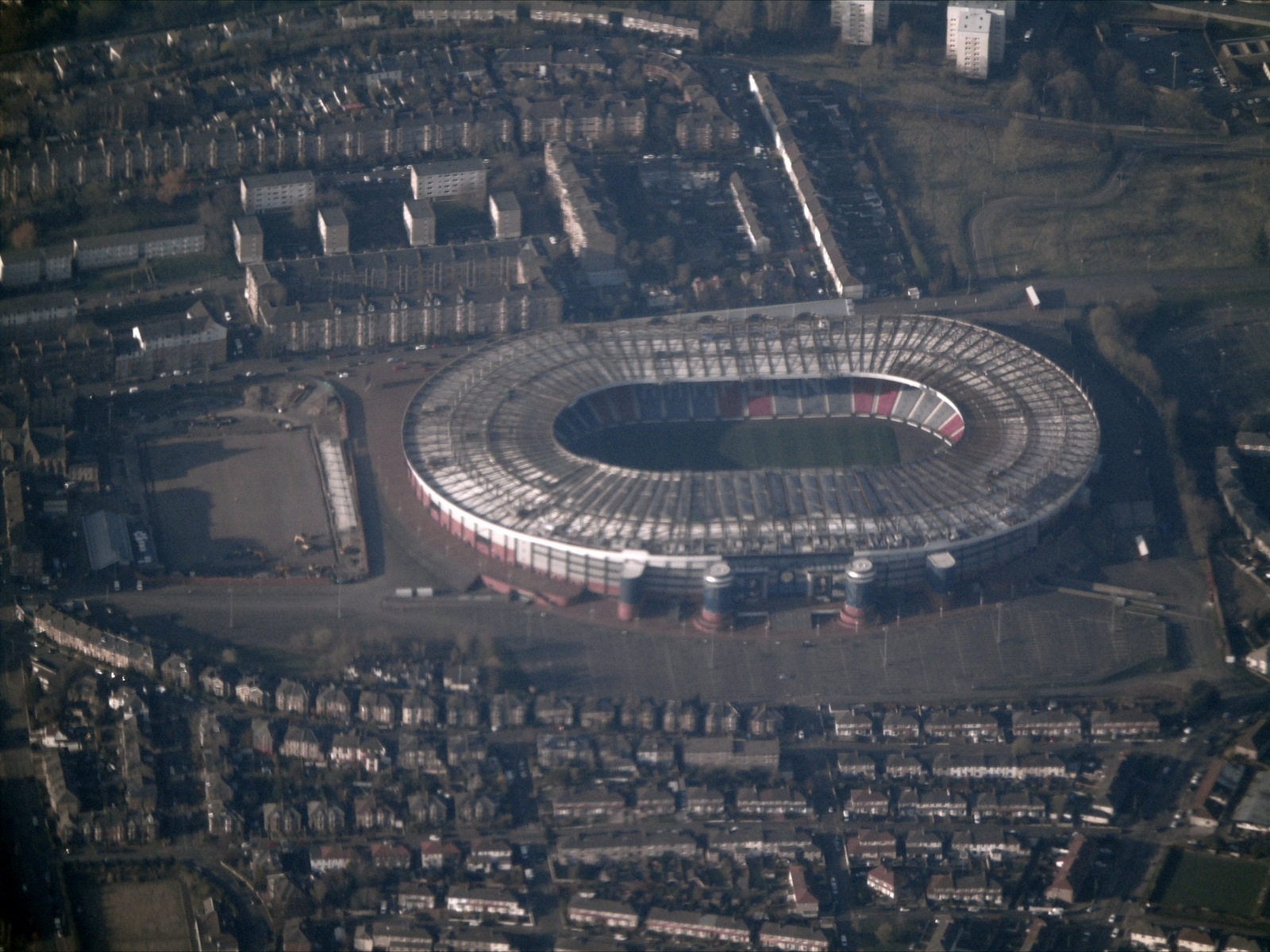
Hampden Park (right), traditional home of Queen's Park and Lesser Hampden (left), current home of Queen's Park.

When Queen's Park was formed in 1867, the club initially played on the Queen's Park Recreation Ground at Crosshill, from where they took their name. In 1873 they moved to their first enclosed ground, naming it Hampden Park after a nearby street, Hampden Terrace. A grandstand and pavilion were erected over the next few years and the ground became a regular venue for international matches and cup finals, but in 1883 the club were forced to vacate the site to make way for the construction of the Cathcart Circle railway. After a year playing at Clydesdale Cricket Club's Titwood ground, a second Hampden was opened in October 1884. Whilst the club continued to attract major fixtures, they faced increasing competition as other Glasgow venues such as Celtic Park and Ibrox were developing their facilities more rapidly. To maintain their position in Scottish football, Queen's Park decided to purchase some farmland at Mount Florida, where the third Hampden was opened in 1903. Second Hampden was subsequently taken over by Third Lanark, who renamed it after their previous ground, Cathkin Park.

Hampden celebrated its centenary on 31 October 2003. The stadium also houses the offices of the Scottish Football Association (SFA) and the Scottish Football Museum. Despite its large capacity and worldwide profile, it was owned by Queen's Park and leased by the SFA until 2020. It is the national football stadium of Scotland, the venue for all major cup finals and most Scotland international fixtures, and has hosted several UEFA competition finals. Hampden Park was the largest stadium in the world until 1950, when the Maracanã in Rio de Janeiro was completed. Many of the record attendances in football were set at Hampden in the mid-20th century. After the release of the Taylor Report in the wake of the Hillsborough disaster, among other football tragedies, it was converted to an all-seater. Hampden's capacity following redevelopment was 51,866, although Queen's Park's average league attendance is around 1,800.

With matches in the 2012 Olympic Games having been played there, Hampden was converted into an athletics venue to be the main stadium of the 2014 Commonwealth Games. This meant Queen's Park had to move its home games to the Excelsior Stadium in Airdrie for a full year; the cup finals and Scotland matches also went elsewhere. The stadium has hosted other sports including rugby union, American football, motorcycle speedway and boxing, as well as many music concerts.

Lesser Hampden is a smaller ground to the west of the main stadium which Queen's Park traditionally used for training and reserve team or youth matches. In 2018, a deal was made for the SFA to purchase Hampden from Queen's Park upon the expiry of the lease in 2020 for a fee of £5 million, with the club intending to improve Lesser Hampden and play their matches there. In November 2019 the club announced plans to redevelop Lesser Hampden into a 1,774 capacity ground. As of August 2020, ownership of the main stadium had been transferred to the SFA and a new facility was under construction at Lesser Hampden. Queen's Park played their last match at Hampden on 20 March 2021, as their lease on the ground expired at the end of the month. They groundshared at the Falkirk Stadium for the rest of the 2020–21 season, Firhill during 2021–22, and Ochilview in 2022–23. The club released a revised plan in December 2021.

On 8 June 2023, Queen's announced that they entered an agreement with the Scottish Football Association to use Hampden Park as their ground for home matches ahead of the upcoming season. This agreement was then extended into the 2024–25 season.

From 2025–26 Queen's returned to Lesser Hampden (known as the City Stadium for sponsorship reasons) which has a capacity of 990, much lower than the proposed numbers during construction and lower by a significant margin than the average attendance of games in the 2024–25 season.

=== Average home attendances ===
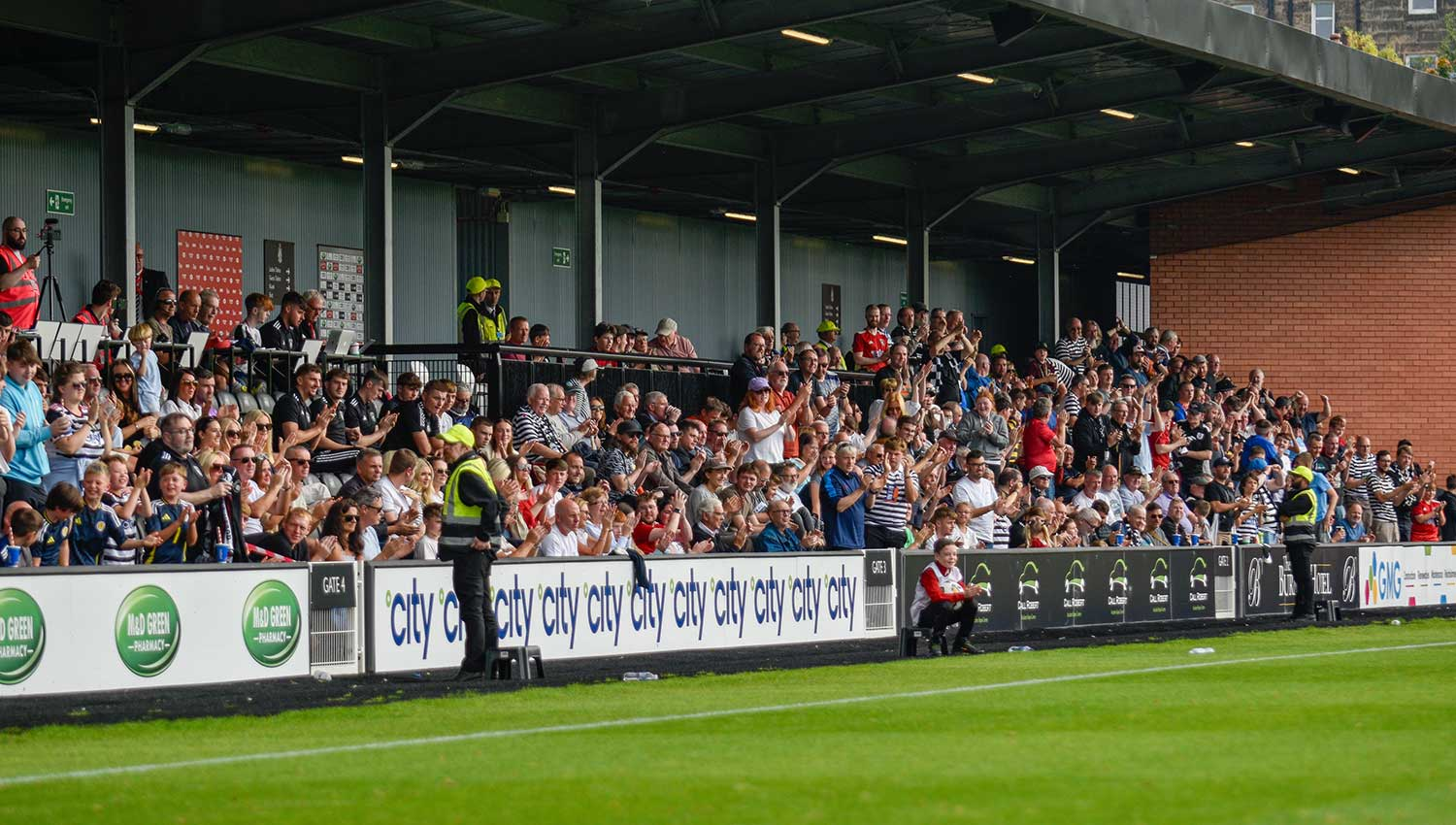
Queen's Park supporters at home.

Year	Average attendance	Stadium
2009/10	541	Hampden Park
2010/11	566	Hampden Park
2011/12	519	Hampden Park
2012/13	2,803	Hampden Park
2013/14	402	Excelsior Stadium
2014/15	509	Hampden Park
2015/16	518	Hampden Park
2016/17	566	Hampden Park
2017/18	688	Hampden Park
2018/19	573	Hampden Park
2019/20	583	Hampden Park
2020/21	0	Falkirk Stadium
2021/22	593	Firhill Stadium
2022/23	911	Ochilview Park
2023/24	1,798	Hampden Park
2024/25	1,608	Hampden Park
2025/26	859	Lesser Hampden

Source: european-football-statistics.co.uk

== Current squad ==
=== First team ===
As of 1 August 2026

Note: Flags indicate national team as defined under FIFA eligibility rules; some limited exceptions apply. Players may hold more than one non-FIFA nationality.

No.	Pos.	Nation	Player
1	GK	SCO	David Mitchell
2	DF	SCO	Zach Mauchin
3	DF	SCO	Magnus Mackenzie
4	DF	SCO	Euan Murray (captain)
5	DF	SCO	Ricki Lamie
7	FW	SCO	Louis Longridge
8	MF	SCO	Scott Martin
9	FW	SCO	Michael Ruth
10	FW	SCO	Jack Hamilton
11	MF	SCO	Aidan Connolly
12	DF	SCO	Carlo Pignatiello
14	MF	SCO	Lewis Stewart (co-operation loan with Rangers)

No.	Pos.	Nation	Player
16	DF	SCO	Oliver Fisher
17	MF	SCO	Tyrece McDonnell
18	MF	SCO	Cole Goldie
20	DF	SCO	Kyle Rodger
21	MF	SCO	Ross Mclean
22	DF	SCO	Matthew Shiels
24	MF	SCO	Aiden McCallion (co-operation loan with Rangers)
25	FW	ENG	Zebedee Lawson (on loan from Rangers)
26	DF	SCO	Ben Brannan (on loan from Kilmarnock)
27	FW	SCO	Callum Smith
30	GK	SCO	Jack Wills
77	FW	BUL	Nikolay Todorov

=== On loan ===
Note: Flags indicate national team as defined under FIFA eligibility rules; some limited exceptions apply. Players may hold more than one non-FIFA nationality.

No.	Pos.	Nation	Player
—	GK	SCO	Archie Aitchison (on loan at Gretna 2008)
—	GK	POL	Milosz Sliwinski (on loan at Annan Athletic)
—	DF	SCO	Cole Burke (on loan at Cumnock Juniors)
—	DF	SCO	Darryl Carrick (on loan at Annan Athletic)
—	DF	IRL	AJ Doyle (on loan at Renfrew)
—	DF	SCO	Grant Kerr (on loan at Gartcairn)
—	DF	SCO	Zac McGoldrick (on loan at Beith Juniors)
—	DF	SCO	Valentino Taouss (on loan at Whitletts Victoria)

No.	Pos.	Nation	Player
—	MF	SCO	Caiden Adams (on loan at Thorn Athletic)
—	MF	CAN	Josiah Sowa (on loan at Dumbarton)
—	MF	SCO	Caiden Wright (on loan at Beith Juniors)
—	FW	ITA	Alex Eguagie (on loan at Albion Rovers)
—	FW	SCO	Lennox Quail (on loan at Darvel)
—	FW	SCO	Lewis Smith (on loan at Arthurlie)
—	FW	SCO	Logan Duffy (on loan at Beith Juniors)

== Coaching staff ==
Position	Name
Head coach	Sean Crighton
Assistant head coach	Jim Duffy
Goalkeeping coach	David Scott
Performance analyst	Declan Tobin
Head physiotherapist	Ed Gray
Head of sport science	Ross Banks
Club doctor	Simon Gibson
Academy director	Tommy McIntyre
U17s head coach	Lee Mitchell

== Managerial history ==
Year	Name
1908–1928	(Scotland) John Nutt
1928–1946	(Northern Ireland) Bert Manderson
1946–1963	(Scotland) Willie Gibson
1963–1965	(Scotland) Eddie Turnbull
1965–1969	(Scotland) Harold Davis
1969–1974	(Scotland) Tommy Duncan
1974–1976	(Scotland) Davie McParland
1976–1979	(Scotland) Joe Gilroy
1979–1994	(Scotland) Eddie Hunter
1994–1997	(Scotland) Hugh McCann
1997–1998	(Scotland) Graeme Elder
1998–2002	(Scotland) John McCormack
2002–2004	(Scotland) Kenny Brannigan
2004–2008	(Scotland) Billy Stark
2008–2013	(Scotland) Gardner Speirs
2014–2018	(Scotland) Gus MacPherson
2018–2019	(Scotland) Mark Roberts
2019–2021	(Scotland) Ray McKinnon
2021–2022	(Scotland) Laurie Ellis
2022	(Scotland) Gardner Speirs
2022–2023	(Scotland) Owen Coyle
2023	(Netherlands) Robin Veldman
2024–2025	(Scotland) Callum Davidson
2025	(Scotland) Steven MacLean
2025–	(Scotland) Sean Crighton

== Records ==
Most capped player:

- All at club: Walter Arnott (14 caps)
- Including some at club: Alan Morton (31 total / 2 at club)
- Played for club, international elsewhere: Andy Robertson (92 caps - ongoing)

Most league points in a season:

- 2 points for a win: 57 (Division Two – season 1922–23)
- 3 points for a win: 69 (Third Division – season 1999–2000)

Most league points per game in a season:

- 2 points for a win: 1.5 (Division Two – 1922–23)
- 3 points for a win: 2.45 (League Two – 2020–21)

Record appearances: Ross Caven (594 appearances)

Record goal scorer: James McAlpine (163 goals)

Most league goals in a season: Willie Martin (30 goals – season 1937–38)

Record victory: 16–0 vs St Peters (Scottish Cup, 26 August 1885)

Record defeat: 0–9 vs Motherwell (Division One, 29 April 1930)

Record attendance: 95,722 vs Rangers (Scottish Cup, 18 January 1930)

Longest spell as club manager: Eddie Hunter (15 years)

Fastest hat-trick: David Galt (5 minutes vs Elgin City, 16 March 2019)

Highest transfer fee received £350,000 (Callan McKenna to AFC Bournemouth, 30 January 2024)

Highest transfer fee paid £50,000 (est) (Nikola Ujdur from Inverness CT, 26 July 2024)

== Honours ==
=== Major ===
==== League ====
- Scottish second tier
  - Winners (2): 1922–23, 1955–56
- Scottish third tier
  - Winners: 1980–81
    - Play-off winners: 2021–22
- Scottish fourth tier
  - Winners (2): 1999–00, 2020–21
    - Play-off winners: 2006–07, 2015–16

==== Cup ====
- Scottish Cup
  - Winners (10): 1874, 1875, 1876, 1880, 1881, 1882, 1884, 1886, 1890, 1893
    - Runners-up: 1892, 1900
- Sheriff of London Charity Shield
  - Winners: 1899 (shared)
- FA Cup
  - Runners-up: 1884, 1885
- Scottish Challenge Cup
  - Runners-up: 2025

=== Minor/Reserve ===
- Football World Championship:
  - Winners (4): 1876, 1881, 1882, 1893
- Glasgow Cup
  - Winners (4): 1889, 1890, 1899, 1946
    - Runners-up (8): 1896, 1898, 1929, 1932, 1940, 1965, 1985, 2022
- Glasgow League
  - Winners (1): 1896–97
    - Runners-up (1): 1897–98
- Glasgow Merchants Charity Cup
  - Winners (8): 1877, 1878, 1880, 1881, 1883, 1884, 1885, 1891
    - Runners-up (20): 1889, 1890, 1894, 1896, 1906, 1908, 1917, 1919, 1920, 1922, 1923, 1926, 1928, 1931, 1933, 1935, 1937, 1953, 1955, 1957
- Ayr Charity Cup
  - Winners (5): 1918, 1920, 1922, 1923, 1925
- Scottish Amateur Cup
  - Winners (12): 1912, 1920, 1928, 1933, 1934, 1936, 1947, 1950, 1951, 1963, 1964, 2009
- SPFL Reserve League
  - Winners (3): 2013–14, 2023–24, 2024–25
- SPFL Reserve League Cup
  - Winners (1): 2013–14

== See also ==
- Club of Pioneers
- List of Queen's Park F.C. players (100+ appearances)
- List of Queen's Park F.C. international players
