= Frank Bokas =

Scottish footballer

Personal information
- Date of birth: 13 May 1914
- Place of birth: Bellshill, Scotland
- Date of death: November 1996 (aged 82)
- Place of death: Barnsley, England
- Height: 5 ft 8 1/2 in (1.74 m)
- Positions: Right half; left half

Youth career
- Kirkintilloch Rob Roy

Senior career*
Years	Team	Apps	(Gls)
1935	Blackpool	6	(0)
1936–1939	Barnsley	89	(4)
1945	Carlisle United	0	(0)
	Gainsborough Trinity	?	(?)
	Grantham	?	(?)
- * Club domestic league appearances and goals

Frank Bokas (13 May 1914 – November 1996) was a Scottish footballer. He played for Blackpool and Barnsley, spending the majority of his career with the latter.

== Career ==
Bellshill-born Bokas began his career with local non-league club Kirkintilloch Rob Roy. In 1935, he moved south of the border to join English club Blackpool. He made six Football League appearances for the Tangerines before joining Barnsley in 1936. He spent three years with the Tykes, making 89 League appearances and scoring four goals. At the end of World War II, he joined Carlisle United, but did not make any appearances for the club. He finished his career with Gainsborough Trinity and Grantham.
