= Hugh Millar (footballer) =

Scottish footballer

Personal information
- Date of birth: 24 May 1898
- Place of birth: Glasgow, Scotland
- Height: 5 ft 11 in (1.80 m)
- Position: Full-back

Senior career*
Years	Team	Apps	(Gls)
1919–1920	Gillingham		
1920–1921	St Roch's		
1921–1924	Grimsby Town	26	(0)
1924	Torquay United	0	(0)
- * Club domestic league appearances and goals

Hugh Millar (24 May 1898 – after 1923) was a Scottish professional footballer who played as a full-back.
