= 1994–95 Dumbarton F.C. season =

Dumbarton
1994–1995 season
- Manager: Murdo MacLeod
- Stadium: Boghead Park, Dumbarton
- Scottish League Division 2: 2nd
- Scottish Cup: First Round
- Scottish League Cup: Second Round
- B&Q Cup: First Round
- Top goalscorer: League: Martin Mooney (17); All: Martin Mooney (17)
- Highest home attendance: 1,369
- Lowest home attendance: 554
- Average home league attendance: 925

Season 1994–95 was the 111th football season in which Dumbarton competed at a Scottish national level, entering the Scottish Football League for the 89th time, the Scottish Cup for the 100th time, the Scottish League Cup for the 48th time and the Scottish Challenge Cup for the fifth time.

== Overview ==
Dumbarton began the league season in the newly structured Division 2 (and the first season where 3 points would be awarded for a win) as one of the favourites to take the title, however things did not begin well with only one win being taken from the first 5 games. However, by the end of the year, results had taken them back into the challenging pack, and by the beginning of March, had broken clear to take the lead. This Dumbarton would hold until the final 3 games. Then a poor draw against Queen of the South saw them replaced at the top by Morton. The next game against a strong Morton side was lost, as was the title, meaning that only a win in the final game away against Stirling Albion would secure promotion. This was done, not without a few nervous moments, and Division 1 football for next season was the prize.

In the national cup competitions, however, for the third year in a row, success was extinguished at the first attempt. In the Scottish Cup Stirling Albion would advance in Dumbarton's place in the first round, after a drawn match.

In the League Cup, Premier Division Hearts defeated Dumbarton easily in the second round.

And it was a fifth straight first round defeat in the B&Q Cup - this time to St Johnstone.

Locally, in the Stirlingshire Cup, the story was no better, with two qualifying defeats to Falkirk and Stirling Albion.

Finally there was success in the Stirling Sixes tournament played in September at Forthbank Stadium, Stirling. After sectional wins over Falkirk (4-0) and Alloa Athletic (1-0) and a draw against Clydebank (1-1), Dumbarton defeated Stenhousemuir 2-0 in the final.

== Results & fixtures ==
Win Draw Loss

=== Scottish Second Division ===
13 August 1994 Second Division	Queen of the South	4–1	Dumbarton	Palmerston Park
	Bryce 39' (pen.); McGuire; McLaren		Mooney	Attendance: 1,389; Referee: T Brown

20 August 1994 Second Division	Stirling Albion	1–1	Dumbarton	Forthbank Stadium
	McLeod 58'		Mooney 78' (pen.)	Attendance: 715; Referee: J McCluskey

27 August 1994 Second Division	Dumbarton	2–1	Morton	Boghead Park
	Mooney 70'; Ward 88'		Lilley 7'	Attendance: 1,168; Referee: J Smith

3 September 1994 Second Division	Dumbarton	0–1	Meadowbank Thistle	Boghead Park
			Wilson 35'	Attendance: 644; Referee: J Young

10 September 1994 Second Division	Berwick Rangers	1–0	Dumbarton	Shielfield Park
	Banks 52'			Attendance: 533; Referee: G Forrest

24 September 1994 Second Division	Dumbarton	2–1	Clyde	Boghead Park
	Boyd 15', 90'		McGill 3'	Attendance: 776

1 October 1994 Second Division	Brechin City	1–2	Dumbarton	Glebe Park, Brechin
	Brand		Martin; McGarvey 78'	Attendance: 427

8 October 1994 Second Division	East Fife	2–3	Dumbarton	Bayview Stadium
	Scott; Beaton		Mooney 44' (pen.); Gibson	Attendance: 795

15 October 1994 Second Division	Dumbarton	1–2	Stenhousemuir	Boghead Park
	Mooney 77' (pen.)		Steel; Fisher	Attendance: 601

22 October 1994 Second Division	Dumbarton	0–0	Queen of the South	Boghead Park
				Attendance: 725

29 October 1994 Second Division	Morton	1–0	Dumbarton	Cappielow Park
	Alexander			Attendance: 1,429

5 November 1994 Second Division	Dumbarton	1–0	Stirling Albion	Boghead Park
	McKinnon 18'			Attendance: 778

12 November 1994 Second Division	Dumbarton	3–2	Berwick Rangers	Boghead Park
	Mooney 75'; King 81'; McGarvey 90'		Irvine; Hawke	Attendance: 733

19 November 1994 Second Division	Meadowbank Thistle	0–0	Dumbarton	Meadowbank Stadium
				Attendance: 210

26 November 1994 Second Division	Clyde	3–1	Dumbarton	Broadwood Stadium
	McAulay; McCluskey		Mooney	Attendance: 1,102

3 December 1994 Second Division	Dumbarton	6–0	Brechin City	Boghead Park
	McGarvey; McKinnon; Mooney; King; Campbell			Attendance: 554

26 December 1994 Second Division	Dumbarton	4–0	East Fife	Boghead Park
	Mooney; Ward; McGarvey; Meechan			Attendance: 862

31 December 1994 Second Division	Stenhousemuir	1–0	Dumbarton	Ochilview Park
	Steel			Attendance: 638

14 January 1995 Second Division	Queen of the South	0–0	Dumbarton	Palmerston Park
				Attendance: 1,066

21 January 1995 Second Division	Dumbarton	2–2	Stirling Albion	Boghead Park
	Mooney; Ward		Tait 63'; Drinkell 77'	Attendance: 700

24 January 1995 Second Division	Dumbarton	2–1	Morton	Boghead Park
	Ward; Gibson		Rajamaki	Attendance: 1,307

4 February 1995 Second Division	Berwick Rangers	1–2	Dumbarton	Shielfield Park
	Neill 25'		Gibson 60'; Meechan 90'	Attendance: 508

11 February 1995 Second Division	Dumbarton	4–0	Meadowbank Thistle	Boghead Park
	Mooney 8'; Ward 16'; Gibson 33'; McGarvey 57'			Attendance: 749

18 February 1995 Second Division	Dumbarton	2–2	Clyde	Boghead Park
	Martin 17'; Mooney		Angus 24' (pen.); Parks	Attendance: 1,183

25 February 1995 Second Division	Brechin City	0–0	Dumbarton	Glebe Park, Brechin
				Attendance: 480

4 March 1995 Second Division	East Fife	0–2	Dumbarton	Bayview Stadium
			Ward 45', 89'	Attendance: 662

14 March 1995 Second Division	Dumbarton	5–1	Stenhousemuir	Boghead Park
	Mooney; Ward; McKinnon		Donaldson	Attendance: 1,132

21 March 1995 Second Division	Dumbarton	1–0	Berwick Rangers	Boghead Park
	Ward			Attendance: 1,012

25 March 1995 Second Division	Meadowbank Thistle	1–0	Dumbarton	Meadowbank Stadium
	Young 22'			Attendance: 389

1 April 1995 Second Division	Dumbarton	4–1	Brechin City	Boghead Park
	Mooney 8', 23'; Meechan 44'; Fabiani 48'		McKellar 82'	Attendance: 1,103

8 April 1995 Second Division	Clyde	1–0	Dumbarton	Broadwood Stadium
	McCluskey 42'			Attendance: 1,189; Referee: G Evans

15 April 1995 Second Division	Dumbarton	2–0	East Fife	Boghead Park
	Mooney 3' (pen.); McKinnon 90'			Attendance: 1,253; Referee: A Roy

22 April 1995 Second Division	Stenhousemuir	0–0	Dumbarton	Ochilview Park
				Attendance: 989; Referee: Mr Taylor

29 April 1995 Second Division	Dumbarton	2–2	Queen of the South	Boghead Park
	Meechan 26'; Mooney		Marsland (OG); McKeown	Attendance: 1,369

6 May 1995 Second Division	Morton	2–0	Dumbarton	Cappielow Park
	Lilley 64' (pen.); Rajamaki 88'			Attendance: 6,242; Referee: M Clark

13 May 1995 Second Division	Stirling Albion	0–2	Dumbarton	Forthbank Stadium
			Ward 54'; Gibson	Attendance: 3,003; Referee: W Crombie

=== Coca-Cola League Cup ===
16 August 1994 League Cup round 2	Dumbarton	0–4	Heart of Midlothian	Boghead Park
			Millar 20'; Robertson 30'; Johnston 46', 69'	Attendance: 1,412; Referee: E Martindale

=== B&Q Cup ===
17 September 1994 Challenge Cup round 1	Dumbarton	2–4	St Johnstone	Boghead Park
	Campbell 90'		Ramsay 24'; O'Boyle 44'; Davenport	Attendance: 961

=== Tennant's Scottish Cup ===
17 December 1994 Cup round 1	Dumbarton	3–3	Stirling Albion	Boghead Park
	Ward; McKinnon		Watters; Mitchell; Tait	Attendance: 794; Man of the Match: H Ward

19 December 1994 Cup round 1	Stirling Albion	3–0	Dumbarton	Forthbank Stadium
	Taggart; McInnes			Attendance: 727

=== Stirlingshire Cup ===
1 August 1994 Group stage	Falkirk	2–1	Dumbarton	Brockville Park
	Henderson 70'; Shaw 88'		Gibson 50'	Attendance: 800; Referee: D Somers

8 August 1994 Group stage	Dumbarton	2–4	Stirling Albion	Boghead Park
	Gibson 78'; Ward 90'		McLeod 24', 44', 72'; McInnes 39'

=== Pre-season/Other Matches ===
31 July 1994 Friendly	Queen's Park	4–1	Dumbarton	Lesser Hampden
	McCormick 39'; Graham 78'; Rodden		Martin	Referee: I Hutchison

6 August 1994 Friendly	Vale of Leven	1–0	Dumbarton	Millburn Park
	Morrison 4' (pen.)

== League table ==
Pos	Team	Pld	W	D	L	GF	GA	GD	Pts	Promotion or relegation
1	Greenock Morton (C, P)	36	18	10	8	55	33	+22	64	Promotion to the First Division
2	Dumbarton (P)	36	17	9	10	57	35	+22	60	Promotion to the First Division
3	Stirling Albion	36	17	7	12	54	43	+11	58	
4	Stenhousemuir	36	14	14	8	46	39	+7	56	
5	Berwick Rangers	36	15	10	11	52	46	+6	55	

Rules for classification: 1) points; 2) goal difference; 3) number of goals scored.
(C) Champions; (P) Promoted

== Player statistics ==
=== Squad ===
No.	Pos	Nat	Player	Total		Second Division		League Cup		Challenge Cup		Scottish Cup	
No.	Pos	Nat	Player	Apps	Goals	Apps	Goals	Apps	Goals	Apps	Goals	Apps	Goals
	GK	(England) ENG	John Burridge	3	0	3+0	0	0+0	0	0+0	0	0+0	0
	GK	(Scotland) SCO	Peter Dennison	1	0	0+0	0	0+0	0	0+0	0	0+1	0
	GK	(Scotland) SCO	Ian MacFarlane	37	0	33+0	0	1+0	0	1+0	0	2+0	0
	DF	(Scotland) SCO	John Boyd	13	2	10+1	2	1+0	0	1+0	0	0+0	0
	DF	(Scotland) SCO	Roland Fabiani	31	1	27+1	1	0+0	0	1+0	0	2+0	0
	DF	(Scotland) SCO	Alan Foster	6	0	5+0	0	0+0	0	0+0	0	1+0	0
	DF	(Scotland) SCO	Stevie Gow	33	0	30+1	0	0+0	0	0+0	0	2+0	0
	DF	(Scotland) SCO	Jim Hamilton	9	0	9+0	0	0+0	0	0+0	0	0+0	0
	DF	(Scotland) SCO	Martin Melvin	20	0	16+0	0	1+0	0	1+0	0	2+0	0
	MF	(Scotland) SCO	Gerry Farrell	2	0	1+0	0	0+0	0	0+1	0	0+0	0
	MF	(Scotland) SCO	Toby King	28	2	25+1	2	0+0	0	0+0	0	2+0	0
	MF	(Scotland) SCO	Jim Marsland	32	0	29+0	0	1+0	0	1+0	0	1+0	0
	MF	(Scotland) SCO	Paul Martin	29	2	28+0	2	1+0	0	0+0	0	0+0	0
	MF	(Scotland) SCO	Bobby McConville	1	0	0+1	0	0+0	0	0+0	0	0+0	0
	MF	(Scotland) SCO	Martin McGarvey	34	6	23+7	6	1+0	0	1+0	0	2+0	0
	MF	(Scotland) SCO	Murdo MacLeod	27	0	24+0	0	1+0	0	1+0	0	1+0	0
	MF	(Scotland) SCO	Jim Meechan	31	4	25+3	4	1+0	0	1+0	0	0+1	0
	FW	(Scotland) SCO	Calum Campbell	18	3	4+10	1	0+1	0	0+1	2	1+1	0
	FW	(Scotland) SCO	Stephen Dallas	1	0	0+1	0	0+0	0	0+0	0	0+0	0
	FW	(Scotland) SCO	Charlie Gibson	29	6	21+5	6	1+0	0	1+0	0	0+1	0
	FW	(Scotland) SCO	Mike Hendry	4	0	1+3	0	0+0	0	0+0	0	0+0	0
	FW	(Scotland) SCO	Colin McKinnon	31	5	25+4	4	0+0	0	0+0	0	2+0	1
	FW	(Scotland) SCO	Martin Mooney	40	17	33+3	17	1+0	0	1+0	0	2+0	0
	FW	(Scotland) SCO	Steve Mooney	2	0	0+2	0	0+0	0	0+0	0	0+0	0
	FW	(Scotland) SCO	Hugh Ward	37	14	24+9	12	1+0	0	1+0	0	2+0	2

=== Transfers ===
==== Players in ====
Player	From	Date
(Scotland) Mike Hendry	(Scotland) Alloa Athletic	26 Sep 1994
(Scotland) Toby King	(Scotland) Arbroath	30 Sep 1994
(Scotland) Colin McKinnon	(Scotland) Arbroath	30 Sep 1994
(England) John Burridge	(Scotland) Aberdeen	15 Nov 1994
(Scotland) Jim Hamilton	(Scotland) Stirling Albion	24 Feb 1995
(Scotland) Stephen Dallas	(Scotland) Hibernian	31 Mar 1995
(Scotland) Steve Mooney	(Scotland) Raith Rovers	31 Mar 1995
(Scotland) Peter Dennison	(Scotland) Vale of Leven	

==== Players out ====
Player	To	Date
(England) John Burridge	(Scotland) Falkirk	19 Nov 1994
(Scotland) John Boyd	(Scotland) St Mirren	7 Dec 1994
(Scotland) Bobby McConville	(Scotland) East Stirling	31 Mar 1995
(Scotland) Eddie Cunnington	(Northern Ireland) Glentoran	
(Scotland) John MacDonald	(Scotland) Inverness CT	
(Scotland) Tommy Wilson		

== Reserve team ==
Dumbarton competed in the Scottish Reserve League (West), and with 9 wins and 4 draws from 28 games, finished 12th of 15.

== Trivia ==
- The League match against East Fife on 8 October marked Stevie Gow's 200th appearance for Dumbarton in all national competitions - the 22nd Dumbarton player to break the 'double century'.
- The Scottish Cup match against Stirling Albion on 19 December marked Martin Mooney's 100th appearance for Dumbarton in all national competitions - the 108th Dumbarton player to reach this milestone.
- The previous season had seen the SFA permit a specialist goalkeeper to be named on the substitutes bench, and it was Peter Dennison who was Dumbarton's first ever goalkeeper substitution during the B&Q Cup match on 17 September against St Johnstone. Dennison was also the club's youngest ever player at 16 years and 79 days.
- The signing of John Burridge following an injury to Dumbarton's first choice keeper, Ian MacFarlane was to set a new record for the oldest player to make an appearance for the club - 42 years and 312 days.

== See also ==
- 1994–95 in Scottish football
