= 1995–96 Dumbarton F.C. season =

Dumbarton
1995–1996 season
- Manager: Murdo MacLeod/Jim Fallon
- Stadium: Boghead Park, Dumbarton
- Scottish League Division 1: 10th
- Scottish Cup: Second Round
- Scottish League Cup: Second Round
- Scottish Challenge Cup: First Round
- Top goalscorer: League: Martin Mooney (5); All: Martin Mooney (6)
- Highest home attendance: 2,733
- Lowest home attendance: 654
- Average home league attendance: 1,352

Season 1995–96 was the 112th football season in which Dumbarton competed at a Scottish national level, entering the Scottish Football League for the 90th time, the Scottish Cup for the 101st time, the Scottish League Cup for the 49th time and the Scottish Challenge Cup for the sixth time.

== Overview ==
After the success of the previous season, no one could foresee the disaster that was to befall Dumbarton. The league season had begun brightly, with the club sitting atop Division 1 with 2 wins from 2. However manager Murdo MacLeod then departed for Premier Division Partick Thistle, and it all began to fall apart. A reluctant Jim Fallon stepped up from his assistant managerial post to take on the reins but it was clear from the start that he was ill-prepared for what was to be faced. Indeed, the only other win to be registered throughout the remainder of the league campaign was an impressive victory over Dundee United. From December, a string of 19 consecutive defeats in the league were suffered, Dumbarton's worst losing streak in their long history. Relegation back to Division 2 was a certainty long before the season had ended.

In the national cup competitions, it was now four seasons without a single win. In the Scottish Cup Airdrie defeated Dumbarton in the second round.

In the League Cup, Premier Division Kilmarnock were victors over Dumbarton, but only after extra time.

Finally, the long wait for a win in the Challenge Cup continued – a first round defeat to Brechin City was the sixth in a row.

Locally, there was something to cheer as the Stirlingshire Cup returned to Boghead, with a final win over East Stirlingshire.

== Results & fixtures ==
Win Draw Loss

=== Scottish First Division ===
12 August 1995 First Division	Dumbarton	1–0	Hamilton	Boghead Park
	Burns 65'			Attendance: 1,191; Referee: J Smith

26 August 1995 First Division	Morton	1–2	Dumbarton	Cappielow Park
	Lilley 56'		Mooney 7' (pen.); Charnley 34'	Attendance: 2,612; Referee: G Allison

2 September 1995 First Division	Dumbarton	0–4	Dunfermline Athletic	Boghead Park
			McNamara 29'; Shaw; Gow 77' (o.g.); Petrie	Attendance: 1,952; Referee: A Waddell

9 September 1995 First Division	Dumbarton	1–2	Airdrie	Boghead Park
	Martin 70'		Boyle; McIntyre, T	Attendance: 1,320; Referee: J McGillvray

16 September 1995 First Division	St Johnstone	4–1	Dumbarton	McDiarmid Park
	O'Boyle 7'; Twaddle 20'; Farquhar; Martin 73' (o.g.)		McKinnon 89'	Attendance: 2,273; Referee: J Herald

23 September 1995 First Division	Dumbarton	1–5	Dundee	Boghead Park
	McGarvey		Shaw 1', 54'; Martin (o.g.); Bain 51'; Hamilton 86'	Attendance: 1,207; Referee: R Tait

30 September 1995 First Division	Clydebank	2–1	Dumbarton	Kilbowie Park
	Grady 22'; Sutherland 83'		Gibson 56'	Attendance: 913

7 October 1995 First Division	Dumbarton	1–0	Dundee United	Boghead Park
	Mooney 81'			Attendance: 2,013; Referee: W Young

14 October 1995 First Division	St Mirren	3–2	Dumbarton	Love Street (stadium)
	Dick 14'; Archdeacon 23'; Yardley		Mooney 12' (pen.); McGarvey	Attendance: 2,377; Referee: T Brown

21 October 1995 First Division	Dunfermline Athletic	3–1	Dumbarton	East End Park
	Petrie 12'; Shaw		Gibson 13'	Attendance: 3,842; Referee: S Dougal

28 October 1995 First Division	Dumbarton	0–2	Morton	Boghead Park
			Hawke 6', 36'	Attendance: 2,378; Referee: J Fleming

4 November 1995 First Division	Dumbarton	1–3	St Johnstone	Boghead Park
	Mooney 26'		Twaddle 47', 58'; O'Boyle	Attendance: 1,050

11 November 1995 First Division	Airdrie	2–1	Dumbarton	Broadwood Stadium
	Davies 14'; Black 81'		Boyle 85' (o.g.)	Attendance: 1,205; Referee: G Clyde

18 November 1995 First Division	Dumbarton	1–2	Clydebank	Boghead Park
	Mooney 61' (pen.)		Grady 7'; Eadie 52'	Attendance: 1,043

2 December 1995 First Division	Dundee United	8–0	Dumbarton	Tannadice Park
	Brewster; Johnston; McSwegan; Coyle (o.g.)			Attendance: 5,285

5 December 1995 First Division	Dundee	1–1	Dumbarton	Dens Park
	Tosh 65'		Dallas	Attendance: 2,804

9 December 1995 First Division	Dumbarton	0–0	St Mirren	Boghead Park
				Attendance: 1,461

16 December 1995 First Division	Hamilton	3–0	Dumbarton	Douglas Park
	Hartley; Clark; McStay			Attendance: 762; Referee: M Pocock

6 January 1996 First Division	St Johnstone	3–0	Dumbarton	McDiarmid Park
	O'Boyle 64', 77'; Burns 81' (o.g.)			Attendance: 2,448; Referee: I Taylor

13 January 1996 First Division	Dumbarton	1–2	Airdrie	Boghead Park
	Granger 89'		Duffield 40'; McIntyre, J 43'	Attendance: 1,045; Referee: J McGillvray

20 January 1996 First Division	Dumbarton	1–3	Dundee United	Boghead Park
	Ward 33'		Brewster 12'; Shannon 30'; McSwegan 74'	Attendance: 1,354; Referee: J Underhill

23 January 1996 First Division	Dumbarton	1–2	Dundee	Boghead Park
	Ward 25'		Hamilton 56', 73'	Attendance: 761; Referee: L Thow

5 February 1996 First Division	St Mirren	5–0	Dumbarton	Love Street (stadium)
	Lavety 21', 57'; Fenwick 60'; Watson 69'; Iwelumo 88'			Attendance: 1,838; Referee: L Mottram

13 February 1996 First Division	Dumbarton	1–2	Hamilton	Boghead Park
	Granger		Hartley	Attendance: 654

17 February 1996 First Division	Clydebank	1–0	Dumbarton	Kilbowie Park
	Eadie 71'			Attendance: 612; Referee: G Clyde

24 February 1965 First Division	Morton	2–0	Dumbarton	Cappielow Park
	Lilley; Mahood			Attendance: 2,833; Referee: R Tait

6 March 1996 First Division	Dundee	3–0	Dumbarton	Dens Park
	Hamilton 13', 51'; Tosh 82'			Attendance: 1,712

9 March 1996 First Division	Dumbarton	0–3	Dunfermline Athletic	Boghead Park
			Shaw; Smith	Attendance: 1,477; Referee: J Herald

16 March 1996 First Division	Dumbarton	0–1	Clydebank	Boghead Park
			Flannigan 84'	Attendance: 654; Referee: S Dougal

23 March 1996 First Division	Dumbarton	0–3	St Johnstone	Boghead Park
			Jenkinson 8'; O'Boyle 20'; Grant 70'	Attendance: 903

30 March 1996 First Division	Airdrie	5–1	Dumbarton	Broadwood Stadium
	Smith; McIntyre, T 49'; Connolly 56', 66'; Hetherston		Foster 33'	Attendance: 1,062

6 April 1996 First Division	Dundee United	6–1	Dumbarton	Tannadice Park
	McSwegan 4', 8', 41', 42'; Perry 59'; Brewster 84'		Sharp 2'	Attendance: 7,142; Referee: W Crombie

13 April 1996 First Division	Dumbarton	0–1	St Mirren	Boghead Park
			Archdeacon 43' (pen.)	Attendance: 1,139; Referee: A Roy

20 April 1996 First Division	Dunfermline Athletic	4–1	Dumbarton	East End Park
	French 46'; Moore; Smith; Shaw		Dallas 21'	Attendance: 5,971

27 April 1996 First Division	Dumbarton	0–1	Morton	Boghead Park
			Anderson 41'	Attendance: 2,733; Referee: L Thow

4 May 1996 First Division	Hamilton	2–1	Dumbarton	Douglas Park
	Hartley; Geraghty		Granger (pen.)	Attendance: 657

=== Coca-Cola League Cup ===
19 August 1995 League Cup round 2	Kilmarnock	1–0 (a.e.t.)	Dumbarton	Rugby Park
	Roberts 118'			Attendance: 5,011; Referee: W Crombie

=== Scottish League Challenge Cup ===
22 August 1995 Challenge Cup round 1	Dumbarton	0–1	Brechin City	Boghead Park
			Mearns 17'	Attendance: 524

=== Tennant's Scottish Cup ===
30 January 1996 Cup round 3	Dumbarton	1–3	Airdrie	Boghead Park
	Mooney		Duffield; Smith	Attendance: 1,076

=== Stirlingshire Cup ===
29 July 1995 First Round	Alloa Athletic	0–2	Dumbarton	Recreation Park, Alloa
			Meechan 61'; McGarvey 82'

15 April 1996 Semi Final	Dumbarton	3–3 (5–4 p)	Stirling Albion	Boghead Park
	Goal		Goal

6 May 1996 Final	Dumbarton	2–1	East Stirling	Boghead Park
	Ward 21'; Meechan 61'		Neill 40'

=== Pre-season/Other Matches ===
26 July 1995 Friendly	Rangers XI	3–2	Dumbarton	University Grounds, Anniesland
	Goal		Goal

2 August 1995 Diadora Cup	Dumbarton	1–2	Bradford City	Boghead Park
	Ward 2'		Wright 41' (pen.); Tolson 89'

5 August 1995 Diadora Cup	Dumbarton	1–2	Wigan Athletic	Boghead Park
	Gow 55'		Lightfoot 8'; Diaz 45'	Attendance: 610; Referee: R Orr

6 August 1995 Friendly	Dumbarton	4–2	Vale of Leven	Boghead Park
	Gow 15'; Grainger 45', 70'; McCuiag 89'		McGinlay 21', 30'

10 October 1995 Friendly	Dumbarton	2–3	Rangers XI	Boghead Park
	McKinnon 26'; Coyle, O		Durrant; Bollan; Boyack 74'	Attendance: 1,500

== League table ==
Pos	Team	Pld	W	D	L	GF	GA	GD	Pts	Promotion or relegation
6	St Mirren	36	13	8	15	46	51	−5	47	
7	Clydebank	36	10	10	16	39	58	−19	40	
8	Airdrieonians	36	9	11	16	43	54	−11	38	
9	Hamilton Academical (R)	36	10	6	20	40	57	−17	36	Relegation to the Second Division
10	Dumbarton (R)	36	3	2	31	23	94	−71	11	Relegation to the Second Division

Source: RSSSF
Rules for classification: 1) points; 2) goal difference; 3) number of goals scored.
(R) Relegated

== Player statistics ==
=== Squad ===
No.	Pos	Nat	Player	Total		First Division		League Cup		Challenge Cup		Scottish Cup	
No.	Pos	Nat	Player	Apps	Goals	Apps	Goals	Apps	Goals	Apps	Goals	Apps	Goals
	GK	(Scotland) SCO	Peter Dennison	2	0	2+0	0	0+0	0	0+0	0	0+0	0
	GK	(Scotland) SCO	Ian MacFarlane	25	0	22+0	0	1+0	0	1+0	0	1+0	0
	GK	(Scotland) SCO	Kenny Meechan	13	0	12+1	0	0+0	0	0+0	0	0+0	0
	DF	(Scotland) SCO	Roland Fabiani	23	0	19+1	0	1+0	0	1+0	0	1+0	0
	DF	(Scotland) SCO	Alan Foster	12	1	10+2	1	0+0	0	0+0	0	0+0	0
	DF	(Scotland) SCO	Stevie Gow	23	0	20+1	0	0+0	0	1+0	0	1+0	0
	DF	(Scotland) SCO	Jim Hamilton	3	0	3+0	0	0+0	0	0+0	0	0+0	0
	DF	(Scotland) SCO	Martin Melvin	34	0	32+1	0	0+0	0	0+0	0	1+0	0
	MF	(Scotland) SCO	Hugh Burns	14	1	10+1	1	1+0	0	1+0	0	1+0	0
	MF	(Scotland) SCO	Chic Charnley	20	1	16+2	1	1+0	0	1+0	0	0+0	0
	MF	(Scotland) SCO	Joe Goldie	2	0	1+1	0	0+0	0	0+0	0	0+0	0
	MF	(Scotland) SCO	Toby King	31	0	27+1	0	1+0	0	1+0	0	1+0	0
	MF	(Scotland) SCO	Jim Marsland	20	0	18+0	0	1+0	0	1+0	0	0+0	0
	MF	(Scotland) SCO	Paul Martin	14	1	12+0	1	1+0	0	1+0	0	0+0	0
	MF	(Scotland) SCO	Martin McGarvey	27	2	14+10	2	1+0	0	0+1	0	0+1	0
	MF	(Scotland) SCO	Sam McGivern	13	0	9+2	0	1+0	0	0+1	0	0+0	0
	MF	(Scotland) SCO	Jim Meechan	34	0	31+1	0	1+0	0	0+0	0	1+0	0
	FW	(Scotland) SCO	Stephen Dallas	23	2	8+14	2	0+0	0	0+0	0	0+1	0
	FW	(Scotland) SCO	Charlie Gibson	32	2	23+6	2	0+1	0	1+0	0	1+0	0
	FW	(Scotland) SCO	Martin Glancy	1	0	1+0	0	0+0	0	0+0	0	0+0	0
	FW	(Scotland) SCO	Alan Granger	34	3	20+11	3	0+1	0	1+0	0	0+1	0
	FW	(Scotland) SCO	Colin McKinnon	35	1	31+2	1	0+0	0	0+1	0	1+0	0
	FW	(Scotland) SCO	Martin Mooney	39	6	31+5	5	1+0	0	1+0	0	1+0	1
	FW	(Scotland) SCO	Lee Sharp	15	1	14+1	1	0+0	0	0+0	0	0+0	0
	FW	(Scotland) SCO	Hugh Ward	15	2	10+4	2	0+0	0	0+0	0	1+0	0

=== Transfers ===
==== Players in ====
Player	From	Date
(Scotland) Chic Charnley	(Scotland) Partick Thistle	28 Jul 1995
(Scotland) Alan Granger	(Scotland) Pollok	9 Aug 1995
(Scotland) Hugh Burns	(Scotland) Ayr United	11 Aug 1995
(Scotland) Sam McGivern	(Scotland) Ayr United	11 Aug 1995
(Scotland) Lee Sharp	(Scotland) Ashfield	11 Dec 1995
(Scotland) Martin Glancy	(Scotland) Petershill	16 Jan 1996
(Scotland) Joe Goldie	(Scotland) Leven Valley Juv	21 May 1996

==== Players out ====
Player	To	Date
(Scotland) Murdo MacLeod	(Scotland) Partick Thistle	13 Aug 1995
(Scotland) Jimmy Gilmour	(Scotland) Bo'ness United	8 Sep 1995
(Scotland) Gerry Farrell	(Scotland) Dunfermline Athletic	5 Oct 1995
(Scotland) Steve Mooney	(Scotland) Ayr United	8 Nov 1995
(Scotland) Jim Hamilton	(Scotland) Forfar Athletic	22 Dec 1995
(Scotland) Chic Charnley	(Scotland) Dundee	6 Jan 1996
(Scotland) Robert Docherty	(Scotland) East Stirling	28 Feb 1996
(Scotland) Calum Campbell	(Scotland) Irvine Meadow	
(Scotland) Mike Hendry	(Scotland) Arbroath	

== Reserve Team ==
Dumbarton competed in the Scottish Reserve League (West), and with 4 wins and 3 draws from 22 games, finished 12th and last.

== Trivia ==
- The League match against Clydebank on 30 September marked Martin Melvin's 200th appearance for Dumbarton in all national competitions – the 23rd Dumbarton player to break the 'double century'.
- The League match against Hamilton on 16 December marked Jim Meechan's 200th appearance for Dumbarton in all national competitions – the 24rd Dumbarton player to break the 'double century'.
- The League match against St Mirren on 9 December marked Martin McGarvey's 100th appearance for Dumbarton in all national competitions – the 109th Dumbarton player to reach this milestone.
- The season ended with a two unwanted records being broken. In addition to the longest losing streak in the league – which extended to a 20-game drought once the Scottish Cup defeat is taken into account – the number of games without a win was also broken. From 14 October, there were 28 consecutive winless games in the league – and 29 consecutive competitive games during the season.
- The two home wins recorded in the league during the season matched the record fewest league home wins last seen during the 1896–97 season. In addition, the 15 home defeats in the league was a new record, easily beating the previous worst of 11 during the 1920–21 season.
- The 10 goals scored at Boghead in league matches beat the previous fewest home league goals (16) set in the 1918–19 season.

== See also ==
- 1995–96 in Scottish football
