= 1993–94 Dumbarton F.C. season =

Dumbarton
1993–1994 season
- Manager: Murdo MacLeod
- Stadium: Boghead Park, Dumbarton
- Scottish League Division 1: 8th
- Scottish Cup: Third Round
- Scottish League Cup: Second Round
- B&Q Cup: First Round
- Top goalscorer: League: Charlie Gibson (13); All: Charlie Gibson (13)
- Highest home attendance: 2,361
- Lowest home attendance: 414
- Average home league attendance: 1,116

Season 1993–94 was the 110th football season in which Dumbarton competed at a Scottish national level, entering the Scottish Football League for the 88th time, the Scottish Cup for the 99th time, the Scottish League Cup for the 47th time and the Scottish Challenge Cup for the fourth time.

== Overview ==
The new league campaign would have added importance as the league structure was once again being revised for 1994-95, with four divisions being created, and the addition of two new clubs, Ross County and Inverness Caledonian Thistle. As it was, results were up and down from the start, but while Dumbarton finished one place short of First Division football, they never really threatened that all important 7th place, finishing 6 points behind Ayr United in 8th.

In the national cup competitions, it was a case of a second successive season of falling at the first hurdle. In the Scottish Cup, Premier Division champions elect, Rangers would defeat Dumbarton in the third round.

In the League Cup, it was Rangers again who defeated Dumbarton by just a single goal in the second round - and it would be Rangers that would lift the trophy at the end of the season.

Finally, it was a fourth time first round exit in the B&Q Cup - a disappointing defeat to Second Division Stranraer.

Locally, in the Stirlingshire Cup, the competition was split into two qualifying sections, and having topped their section of Falkirk, Stenhousemuir and East Stirling, Dumbarton went on to win the trophy in the final against Alloa Athletic, on penalties, after a scoreless draw.

== Results & fixtures ==
Win Draw Loss

=== Scottish First Division ===
7 August 1993 First Division	Stirling Albion	2–0	Dumbarton	Forthbank Stadium
	Watters; Reilly			Attendance: 879; Referee: A Waddell

14 August 1993 First Division	Dumbarton	3–0	Clyde	Boghead Park
	Boyd 30'; Gibson 72'			Attendance: 1,001; Referee: D Hope

21 August 1993 First Division	Dumbarton	2–4	Clydebank	Boghead Park
	Gibson 11'; Meechan		McIntosh; Boyd (o.g.); Jack; Eadie	Attendance: 1,597; Referee: R Tait

28 August 1993 First Division	Ayr United	0–1	Dumbarton	Somerset Park
			Mooney 46'	Attendance: 1,675; Referee: M Clark

4 September 1993 First Division	Dumbarton	0–0	Hamilton	Boghead Park
				Attendance: 1,044; Referee: D McVicar

11 September 1993 First Division	St Mirren	0–3	Dumbarton	Love Street (stadium)
			Mooney 45', 76'; Gibson	Attendance: 2,607; Referee: J McCluskey

14 September 1993 First Division	Dumbarton	1–0	Brechin City	Boghead Park
	McConville			Attendance: 562; Referee: G Clyde

18 September 1993 First Division	Dumbarton	0–1	Falkirk	Boghead Park
			McLaughlin 14'	Attendance: 2,361; Referee: W Morrison

25 September 1993 First Division	Morton	3–1	Dumbarton	Cappielow Park
	Collins; Doak (pen.); McEwan		McGarvey	Attendance: 1,420; Referee: J Timmons

28 September 1993 First Division	Dumbarton	0–1	Airdrie	Boghead Park
			Smith	Attendance: 1,276; Referee: L Thow

2 October 1993 First Division	Dunfermline Athletic	4–1	Dumbarton	East End Park
	Smith 46'; McCathie 55'; O'Boyle 52'; Laing		Melvin	Attendance: 2,941; Referee: H Dallas

9 October 1993 First Division	Dumbarton	1–2	Stirling Albion	Boghead Park
	Foster 32'		Pew 38'; Lawrie 59'	Attendance: 766; Referee: J Herald

2 October 1993 First Division	Brechin City	0–3	Dumbarton	Glebe Park, Brechin
			Mooney (pen.); MacDonald; Foster	Attendance: 469; Referee: D McVicar

23 October 1993 First Division	Dumbarton	3–3	St Mirren	Boghead Park
	McGarvey 76'; Gow 85'; MacDonald 90+2'		Gallagher 38'	Attendance: 1,723; Referee: D Syme

30 October 1993 First Division	Clydebank	2–1	Dumbarton	Kilbowie Park
	Henry; Thomson 82' (pen.)		Walker	Attendance: 1,297; Referee: J Smith

6 November 1993 First Division	Dumbarton	1–1	Ayr United	Boghead Park
	Gibson 3'		Bryce 68'	Attendance: 918; Referee: L Mottram

10 November 1993 First Division	Hamilton	2–0	Dumbarton	Douglas Park
	Duffield 85'			Attendance: 1,182; Referee: W Young

13 November 1993 First Division	Dumbarton	1–5	Dunfermline Athletic	Boghead Park
	Gibson		French (20}), 40'; Laing 22'	Attendance: 1,437; Referee: E Martindale

20 November 1993 First Division	Airdrie	0–1	Dumbarton	Broadwood Stadium
			Marsland 80'	Attendance: 1,741; Referee: J Herald

27 November 1993 First Division	Dumbarton	2–0	Morton	Boghead Park
	Gibson; McGarvey			Attendance: 1,140; Referee: W Crombie

4 December 1993 First Division	Falkirk	1–1	Dumbarton	Brockville Park
	Hughes 22'		Mooney 63'	Attendance: 3,306; Referee: M Clark

11 December 1993 First Division	Clyde	2–1	Dumbarton	Broadwood Stadium
	Sludden 45'; Strain 74'		Mooney 56'	Attendance: 681; Referee: I Taylor

18 December 1993 First Division	Dumbarton	3–1	Brechin City	Boghead Park
	Melvin; Mooney 41', 58' (pen.)		Brand	Attendance: 414; Referee: W Morrison

8 January 1994 First Division	Ayr United	1–1	Dumbarton	Somerset Park
	Hood 43'		Meechan 22'	Attendance: 2,084; Referee: R Orr

11 January 1994 First Division	Stirling Albion	0–0	Dumbarton	Forthbank Stadium
				Attendance: 758; Referee: J Rowbotham

15 January 1994 First Division	Dumbarton	0–1	Hamilton	Boghead Park
			Clark	Attendance: 744; Referee: J O'Hare

18 January 1994 First Division	Dumbarton	2–2	Clydebank	Boghead Park
	Gibson 1'; Melvin 50'		Flannigan 5'; Thomson 83'	Attendance: 1,003; Referee: G Evans

22 January 1994 First Division	Dumbarton	1–1	Clyde	Boghead Park
	Gibson		Strain 12'	Attendance: 927; Referee: D Hope

5 February 1994 First Division	St Mirren	0–3	Dumbarton	Love Street (stadium)
			Gibson 18'; Meechan 54'; Boyd 82'	Attendance: 2,504; Referee: L Thow

12 February 1994 First Division	Dunfermline Athletic	3-2	Dumbarton	East End Park
	Petrie 5'; Tod 28', 49'		Meechan; Gibson	Attendance: 3,821; Referee: G Dunbar

1 March 1994 First Division	Dumbarton	0–0	Airdrie	Boghead Park
				Attendance: 950; Referee: D Syme

5 March 1994 First Division	Dumbarton	0–1	Falkirk	Boghead Park
			Cadette 13'	Attendance: 1,815; Referee: R Tait

12 March 1994 First Division	Morton	0-0	Dumbarton	Cappielow Park
				Attendance: 1,046; Referee: J Herald

19 March 1994 First Division	Brechin City	0-0	Dumbarton	Glebe Park, Brechin
				Attendance: 425; Referee: J O'Hare

26 March 1994 First Division	Dumbarton	0–0	Stirling Albion	Boghead Park
				Attendance: 887; Referee: G Tran

29 March 1994 First Division	Clyde	1-2	Dumbarton	Broadwood Stadium
	Tennant 45'		Ward 74'; MacLeod 88'	Attendance: 789; Referee: J McCluskey

2 April 1994 First Division	Dumbarton	2–3	St Mirren	Boghead Park
	Gibson 65'; Mooney 75'		Bone 24'; Elliot 45'; Lavety 84'	Attendance: 1,377; Referee: T McCurry

12 April 1994 First Division	Dumbarton	0–2	Dunfermline Athletic	Boghead Park
			Robertson 9'; McWilliams 69'	Attendance: 1,305; Referee: D Syme

16 April 1994 First Division	Airdrie	1-1	Dumbarton	Broadwood Stadium
	Smith 56'		Melvin 86'	Attendance: 1,320; Referee: G Clyde

23 April 1994 First Division	Falkirk	4-0	Dumbarton	Brockville Park
	Ristic 50'; Cadette 57'; May 76', 81'			Attendance: 3,249; Referee: K Clark

26 April 1994 First Division	Dumbarton	2–0	Morton	Boghead Park
	Cunnington 15'; Gibson 53'			Attendance: 650; Referee: W Innes

30 April 1994 First Division	Clydebank	2-0	Dumbarton	Kilbowie Park
	Ferguson 53', 73'			Attendance: 929; Referee: L Thow

7 May 1994 First Division	Dumbarton	1–1	Ayr United	Boghead Park
	Cunnington 45'		Bilsland 42'	Attendance: 670; Referee: T Brown

14 May 1994 First Division	Hamilton	2-1	Dumbarton	Douglas Park
	Duffield 50', 82'		Cunnington 33'	Attendance: 1,451; Referee: J Smith

=== Scottish League Cup ===
11 August 1993 League Cup round 2	Rangers	1–0	Dumbarton	Ibrox Park
	Ferguson			Attendance: 36,309; Referee: G Evans

=== B&Q Cup ===
5 October 1993 Challenge Cup round 1	Dumbarton	1–2	Stranraer	Boghead Park
	Foster 44'		Henderson 12'; Sloan 15'	Attendance: 446; Referee: D Hope

=== Tennant's Scottish Cup ===
29 January 1994 Cup round 3	Rangers	4–1	Dumbarton	Ibrox Park
	Durie 5'; Hately (pen.); Steven 39'; Robertson, D		Mooney 78' (pen.)	Attendance: 36,671; Referee: K Clark

=== Stirlingshire Cup ===
24 July 1993 Group stage	Dumbarton	2–1	Falkirk	Boghead Park
	McQuade 64' 73'		Rice 9'	Referee: G Dunbar

27 July 1993 Group stage	Dumbarton	1–3	Stenhousemuir	Boghead Park
	McGarvey 30'		Fisher; Dickov 50'; Irvine 67'	Referee: J McElhinney

31 July 1993 Group stage	East Stirling	0–1	Dumbarton	Firs Park
			McQuade 70'	Referee: I Hutchison

21 September 1993 Final	Dumbarton	0–0 (5-3 p)	Alloa Athletic	Boghead Park
				Referee: W Innes

=== Pre-season and other matches ===
15 July 1993 Friendly	Dumbarton	2–0	Kilmarnock	Boghead Park
	McQuade			Attendance: CD

2 August 1993 Friendly	Vale of Leven	1–1	Dumbarton	Millburn Park
	Morrison		Goal	Attendance: CD

== League table ==
Pos	Team	Pld	W	D	L	GF	GA	GD	Pts	Promotion or relegation
6	St Mirren	44	21	8	15	42	48	−6	50	
7	Ayr United	44	14	14	16	42	52	−10	42	
8	Dumbarton (R)	44	11	14	19	48	59	−11	36	Relegation to the Second Division
9	Stirling Albion (R)	44	13	9	22	41	68	−27	35	Relegation to the Second Division
10	Clyde (R)	44	10	12	22	35	58	−23	32	Relegation to the Second Division

Source: RSSSF and statto
Rules for classification: 1) points; 2) goal difference; 3) number of goals scored.
(R) Relegated

== Player statistics ==
=== Squad ===
No.	Pos	Nat	Player	Total		First Division		League Cup		Challenge Cup		Scottish Cup	
No.	Pos	Nat	Player	Apps	Goals	Apps	Goals	Apps	Goals	Apps	Goals	Apps	Goals
	GK	(Scotland) SCO	Ian MacFarlane	46	0	43+0	0	1+0	0	1+0	0	1+0	0
	GK	(Scotland) SCO	Kenny Meechan	1	0	1+0	0	0+0	0	0+0	0	0+0	0
	DF	(Scotland) SCO	John Boyd	16	2	11+3	2	1+0	0	0+0	0	0+1	0
	DF	(Scotland) SCO	Eddie Cunnington	13	3	13+0	3	0+0	0	0+0	0	0+0	0
	DF	(Scotland) SCO	Roland Fabiani	41	0	36+3	0	0+0	0	1+0	0	1+0	0
	DF	(Scotland) SCO	Alan Foster	30	3	22+5	2	1+0	0	1+0	1	1+0	0
	DF	(Scotland) SCO	Stevie Gow	17	1	12+2	1	1+0	0	1+0	0	1+0	0
	DF	(Scotland) SCO	Martin Melvin	45	4	42+0	4	1+0	0	1+0	0	1+0	0
	DF	(Scotland) SCO	Tommy Wilson	20	0	19+0	0	0+0	0	0+0	0	1+0	0
	MF	(Scotland) SCO	Robert Docherty	1	0	0+1	0	0+0	0	0+0	0	0+0	0
	MF	(Scotland) SCO	Gerry Farrell	1	0	0+1	0	0+0	0	0+0	0	0+0	0
	MF	(Scotland) SCO	Jim Marsland	38	1	32+4	1	0+1	0	1+0	0	0+0	0
	MF	(Scotland) SCO	Paul Martin	20	0	17+2	0	0+0	0	1+0	0	0+0	0
	MF	(Scotland) SCO	Bobby McConville	23	1	19+2	1	1+0	0	1+0	0	0+0	0
	MF	(Scotland) SCO	Martin McGarvey	37	3	27+8	3	1+0	0	0+0	0	1+0	0
	MF	(Scotland) SCO	Murdo MacLeod	44	1	42+0	1	1+0	0	0+0	0	1+0	0
	MF	(Scotland) SCO	Jim Meechan	38	4	31+5	4	1+0	0	0+0	0	1+0	0
	MF	(Scotland) SCO	Mark Nelson	3	0	0+3	0	0+0	0	0+0	0	0+0	0
	FW	(Scotland) SCO	Calum Campbell	14	0	12+2	0	0+0	0	0+0	0	0+0	0
	FW	(Scotland) SCO	Charlie Gibson	46	13	44+0	13	1+0	0	0+0	0	1+0	0
	FW	(Scotland) SCO	Jimmy Gilmour	6	0	1+5	0	0+0	0	0+0	0	0+0	0
	FW	(Scotland) SCO	Mike McAnenay	3	0	0+1	0	0+1	0	1+0	0	0+0	0
	FW	(Scotland) SCO	John MacDonald	7	2	3+3	2	0+0	0	1+0	0	0+0	0
	FW	(Scotland) SCO	John McQuade	4	0	3+0	0	1+0	0	0+0	0	0+0	0
	FW	(Scotland) SCO	Martin Mooney	45	10	41+2	9	0+0	0	1+0	0	1+0	1
	FW	(Scotland) SCO	Tommy Walker	8	1	6+2	1	0+0	0	0+0	0	0+0	0
	FW	(Scotland) SCO	Hugh Ward	10	1	7+3	1	0+0	0	0+0	0	0+0	0
	FW	(Scotland) SCO	Andy Willock	1	0	0+0	0	0+0	0	0+1	0	0+0	0

=== Transfers ===
==== Players in ====
Player	From	Date
(Scotland) Murdo MacLeod	(Scotland) Hibernian	7 Jul 1993
(Scotland) Roland Fabiani	(Scotland) St Mirren	20 Aug 1993
(Scotland) John MacDonald	(Scotland) Airdrie	24 Sep 1993
(Scotland) Tommy Walker	(Scotland) Ayr United	9 Oct 1993
(Scotland) Hugh Ward	(Scotland) Greenock	5 Nov 1993
(Scotland) Tommy Wilson	(Scotland) Kilmarnock	19 Nov 1993
(Scotland) Gerry Farrell	(Scotland) Possil YM	17 Dec 1993
(Scotland) Calum Campbell	(Scotland) Kilmarnock	11 Feb 1994
(Scotland) Eddie Cunnington	(Scotland) Dunfermline Athletic	5 Mar 1994
(Scotland) Kenny Meechan	(Scotland) Greenock	31 Mar 1994

==== Players out ====
Player	To	Date
(Scotland) John McQuade	(Scotland) Hamilton	31 Aug 1993
(Scotland) Tony Speirs	(Scotland) East Stirling	4 Sep 1993
(Scotland) Mike McAnenay	(Scotland) Alloa Athletic	8 Oct 1993
(Scotland) Andy Willock	(Scotland) Alloa Athletic	9 Oct 1993
(Scotland) Mike Monaghan	(Scotland) Stirling Albion	22 Feb 1994
(Scotland) Tommy Walker	(Scotland) Stranraer	26 Feb 1994
(Scotland) Mark Nelson	(Scotland) Alloa Athletic	1 Mar 1994
(Scotland) John Boag (footballer, born 1965)	(Scotland) Fort William	
(Scotland) Jim Cowell	(Scotland) Elgin City	
(Scotland) John Young	(Scotland) Vale of Leven	
(Scotland) D McDonald	(Scotland)	

== Reserve team ==
Dumbarton competed in the Scottish Reserve League (West B), and with 9 wins and 4 draws from 24 games, finished 7th of 9.

In the Reserve League Cup, Dumbarton lost out to St Johnstone in the first round.

== Trivia ==
- The League match against Clyde on 14 August marked Charlie Gibson's 200th appearance for Dumbarton in all national competitions - the 21st Dumbarton player to break the 'double century'.
- The League match against Ayr United on 6 November marked Ian MacFarlane's 100th appearance for Dumbarton in all national competitions - the 107th Dumbarton player to reach this milestone.
- The crowd of 36,671 at Ibrox for the Scottish Cup tie against Rangers on 24 January was the largest to have ever witnessed a Dumbarton match. This beat the previous record set just 5 months earlier, in a League Cup tie against the same opponents at the same venue.

== See also ==
- 1993–94 in Scottish football
