= 1996–97 Dumbarton F.C. season =

Dumbarton
1996–1997 season
- Manager: Jim Fallon/Ian Wallace
- Stadium: Boghead Park, Dumbarton
- Scottish League Division 2: 9th
- Scottish Cup: Second Round
- Scottish League Cup: Second Round
- Scottish Challenge Cup: First Round
- Top goalscorer: League: Hugh Ward (7); All: Hugh Ward (7)
- Highest home attendance: 762
- Lowest home attendance: 411
- Average home league attendance: 627

Season 1996–97 was the 113th football season in which Dumbarton competed at a Scottish national level, entering the Scottish Football League for the 91st time, the Scottish Cup for the 102nd time, the Scottish League Cup for the 50th time and the Scottish Challenge Cup for the seventh time.

== Overview ==
Despite the failures of the previous season, manager Jim Fallon retained his position and unfortunately that decision was to prove disastrous as the league campaign started off in the same poor manner as the previous one. By the end of October, Dumbarton had one win to show for 13 league matches, and had sunk to second bottom place, resulting in Fallon's resignation. Within a week Ian Wallace, one of the club's brightest stars of the 1970s, had been installed and things began to take a turn for the better. Three wins on the trot in November saw Wallace named as Second Division manager of the month, but it wasn't to last. Results began again to go downhill, but even with three games left it was within Dumbarton's own hands whether a second successive relegation would occur. A last minute defeat to Stranraer and an uninspiring loss to Queen of the South meant that they had to better any result that Stranraer could achieve on the last day. As it was, a win over Brechin City was not enough, and it would be Third Division football next season and the fourth tier of Scottish football for the first time in the club's history.

In the national cup competitions, the drought on wins extended for a fifth season. In the Scottish Cup Cowdenbeath defeated Dumbarton in the second round.

In the League Cup, Premier Division Dundee beat Dumbarton, also in the second round.

Finally, in the Challenge Cup, it was a seventh first round defeat in seven attempts – this time to Montrose.

Locally, in the Stirlingshire Cup the misery was compounded with a defeat to Falkirk.

== Results & fixtures ==
Win Draw Loss

=== Scottish Second Division ===
17 August 1996 Scottish Second Division	Dumbarton	1–1	Stranraer	Boghead Park
	Dallas 43'		McIntyre 50'	Attendance: 560

24 August 1996 Second Division	Queen of the South	2–1	Dumbarton	Palmerston Park
	Mallan 60'; Flannigan 83'		Meechan 66'	Attendance: 1,127

31 August 1996 Second Division	Dumbarton	1–1	Brechin City	Boghead Park
	McGivern 57'		Kerrigan 13'	Attendance: 560

7 September 1996 Second Division	Clyde	0–1	Dumbarton	Broadwood Stadium
			Ward 87'	Attendance: 721

14 September 1996 Second Division	Dumbarton	2–4	Livingston	Boghead Park
	McKinnon 41'; Ward 65'		Harvie 9' (pen.), 44'; Young 30'; McLeod 70'	Attendance: 762

21 September 1996 Second Division	Berwick Rangers	3–1	Dumbarton	Shielfield Park
	Grant 33'; Craig 56'; Robinson 81'		Ward 76'	Attendance: 326

28 September 1996 Second Division	Dumbarton	1–1	Stenhousemuir	Boghead Park
	Meechan 67'		Henderson 85'	Attendance: 524

5 October 1996 Second Division	Dumbarton	1–3	Ayr United	Boghead Park
	Dallas 13'		Kinnaird 28'; Henderson 37'; English 55'	Attendance: 939

12 October 1996 Second Division	Hamilton	2–0	Dumbarton	Cliftonhill Stadium
	Thomson 65'; Ritchie 75'			Attendance: 533

19 October 1996 Second Division	Stranraer	2–0	Dumbarton	Stair Park
	Docherty 5'; Young 76'			Attendance: 460

26 October 1996 Second Division	Dumbarton	1–2	Queen of the South	Boghead Park
	Rowe 31' (OG)		McFarlane 68'; Mallan 77'	Attendance: 562

2 November 1996 Second Division	Livingston	5–0	Dumbarton	Almondvale Stadium
	Young 16'; Harvey 20', 34'; Duthie 53'; Alleyne 80'			Attendance: 1,941

9 November 1996 Second Division	Dumbarton	2–2	Clyde	Boghead Park
	Wilson 5'; McKinnon 90'		Mathieson 24'; Brownlie 68'	Attendance: 724

16 November 1996 Second Division	Stenhousemuir	0–1	Dumbarton	Ochilview
			Meechan 23'	Attendance: 564

23 November 1996 Second Division	Dumbarton	1–0	Berwick Rangers	Boghead Park
	Ward 51'			Attendance: 601

30 November 1996 Second Division	Ayr United	1–4	Dumbarton	Somerset Park
	English 24'		McKinnon 49'; Glancy 56', 65'; Ward 63'	Attendance: 1,773

14 December 1996 Second Division	Dumbarton	1–3	Hamilton	Boghead Park
	Wilson 55'		Fotheringham 40'; Ritchie 55', 65'	Attendance: 733

26 December 1996 Second Division	Dumbarton	2–2	Stranraer	Boghead Park
	Sharp 63'; Meechan 90'		Young 15'; McIntyre 86'	Attendance: 686

28 December 1996 Second Division	Brechin City	2–1	Dumbarton	Glebe Park, Brechin
	Conway 50'; Brand 54'		Granger 89' (pen.)	Attendance: 356

11 January 1997 Second Division	Berwick Rangers	0–3	Dumbarton	Shielfield Park
			Glancy 33'; King 54'; Ward 82'	Attendance: 346

18 January 1997 Second Division	Dumbarton	1–1	Ayr United	Boghead Park
	Sharp 80'		Sharp 39' (OG)	Attendance: 801

21 January 1997 Second Division	Dumbarton	0–2	Stenhousemuir	Boghead Park
			Little 20'; Fisher 70'	Attendance: 470

1 February 1997 Second Division	Hamilton	4–0	Dumbarton	Cliftonhill Stadium
	Ritchie 4', 33', 43', 53'			Attendance: 505

8 February 1997 Second Division	Dumbarton	2–3	Livingston	Boghead Park
	Mooney 35'; McKinnon 62'		Duthie 15'; Harvey 74'; McLeod 77'	Attendance: 503

22 February 1997 Second Division	Queen of the South	4–0	Dumbarton	Palmerston Park
	Bryce 54', 74', 76', 77'			Attendance: 908

1 March 1997 Second Division	Dumbarton	1–2	Brechin City	Boghead Park
	Hringsson 16'		McKellar 11'; Sorbie 65'	Attendance: 411

4 March 1997 Second Division	Clyde	2–1	Dumbarton	Broadwood Stadium
	Mathieson 33'; Annand 68'		Hringsson 51'	Attendance: 480

8 March 1997 Second Division	Dumbarton	2–2	Berwick Rangers	Boghead Park
	Hringsson 18'; Sharp 21'		Manson 24'; Reid 81'	Attendance: 446

15 March 1997 Second Division	Stenhousemuir	1–4	Dumbarton	Ochilview
	Harrow 70'		Wilson 21'; King 48'; Glancy 60'; Sharp 80'	Attendance: 376

22 March 1997 Second Division	Ayr United	1–1	Dumbarton	Somerset Park
	Horace 44'		Meechan 27'	Attendance: 1,575

5 April 1997 Second Division	Dumbarton	0–3	Hamilton	Boghead Park
			McCormick 30', 51'; Ritchie 90'	Attendance: 718

12 April 1997 Second Division	Dumbarton	2–0	Clyde	Boghead Park
	Wilson 54'; Ward 61'			Attendance: 554

19 April 1997 Second Division	Livingston	1–2	Dumbarton	Almondvale Stadium
	McLeod 18'		Meechan 81'; Sharp 83'	Attendance: 1,579

26 April 1997 Second Division	Stranraer	1–0	Dumbarton	Stair Park
	Higgins 86'			Attendance: 739

3 May 1997 Second Division	Dumbarton	0–3	Queen of the South	Boghead Park
			Mallan 23', 73', 90'	Attendance: 643

10 May 1997 Second Division	Brechin City	0–3	Dumbarton	Glebe Park, Brechin
			Glancy 11', 73'; Reilly 39'	Attendance: 620

=== Scottish League Challenge Cup ===
10 August 1996 Challenge Cup R1	Montrose	2–0	Dumbarton	Links Park
	Smith 17'; Glass 48'			Attendance: 309

=== Coca-Cola League Cup ===
13 August 1996 League Cup R2	Dundee	2–1	Dumbarton	Dens Park
	Reaeside 75'; Hamilton 85'		Dallas 28'	Attendance: 1,872

=== Tennant's Scottish Cup ===
13 January 1997 Cup R2	Cowdenbeath	1–0	Dumbarton	Central Park, Cowdenbeath
	Scott 49'			Attendance: 294

=== Stirlingshire Cup ===
28 January 1997 First Round	Falkirk	2–1	Dumbarton	Brockville Park
	Crabbe 12', 38'		Goal

=== Pre-season/Other Matches ===
29 July 1996 Friendly	Vale of Leven	4-1	Dumbarton	Millburn Park
	Mellis; Grace		Grainger

== League table ==
Pos	Team	Pld	W	D	L	GF	GA	GD	Pts	Promotion or relegation
6	Stenhousemuir	36	11	11	14	49	43	+6	44	
7	Brechin City	36	10	11	15	36	49	−13	41	
8	Stranraer	36	9	9	18	29	51	−22	36	
9	Dumbarton (R)	36	9	8	19	44	66	−22	35	Relegation to the Third Division
10	Berwick Rangers (R)	36	4	11	21	32	75	−43	23	Relegation to the Third Division

Source: "1996-1997 Second Division - SPFL Archive". SPFL.
Rules for classification: 1) points; 2) goal difference; 3) number of goals scored.
(R) Relegated

== Player statistics ==
=== Squad ===
No.	Pos	Nat	Player	Total		Second Division		League Cup		Challenge Cup		Scottish Cup	
No.	Pos	Nat	Player	Apps	Goals	Apps	Goals	Apps	Goals	Apps	Goals	Apps	Goals
	GK	(Scotland) SCO	Derek Barnes	12	0	11+0	0	0+0	0	0+0	0	1+0	0
	GK	(Scotland) SCO	Peter Dennison	2	0	2+0	0	0+0	0	0+0	0	0+0	0
	GK	(Scotland) SCO	Ian MacFarlane	11	0	9+0	0	1+0	0	1+0	0	0+0	0
	GK	(Scotland) SCO	Kenny Meechan	14	0	14+0	0	0+0	0	0+0	0	0+0	0
	DF	(Scotland) SCO	Jamie Bruce	9	0	9+0	0	0+0	0	0+0	0	0+0	0
	DF	(Scotland) SCO	Billy Davidson	17	0	12+4	0	0+0	0	0+0	0	1+0	0
	DF	(Scotland) SCO	Stevie Gow	26	0	21+3	0	1+0	0	1+0	0	0+0	0
	DF	(Scotland) SCO	Graeme McKenzie	5	0	4+1	0	0+0	0	0+0	0	0+0	0
	DF	(Scotland) SCO	Martin Melvin	25	0	23+0	0	1+0	0	0+1	0	0+0	0
	DF	(Scotland) SCO	David Reid	1	0	0+1	0	0+0	0	0+0	0	0+0	0
	MF	(Scotland) SCO	Joe Goldie	4	0	1+3	0	0+0	0	0+0	0	0+0	0
	MF	(Scotland) SCO	Toby King	30	2	27+0	2	1+0	0	1+0	0	1+0	0
	MF	(Scotland) SCO	Jim Marsland	34	0	30+1	0	1+0	0	1+0	0	1+0	0
	MF	(Scotland) SCO	Gerry McCabe	4	0	4+0	0	0+0	0	0+0	0	0+0	0
	MF	(Scotland) SCO	Martin McGarvey	15	0	7+5	0	1+0	0	1+0	0	1+0	0
	MF	(Scotland) SCO	Sam McGivern	2	1	1+1	1	0+0	0	0+0	0	0+0	0
	MF	(Scotland) SCO	Jim Meechan	39	6	36+0	6	1+0	0	1+0	0	1+0	0
	MF	(Scotland) SCO	Adrian Mellis	1	0	1+0	0	0+0	0	0+0	0	0+0	0
	MF	(Scotland) SCO	John Scott	2	0	0+1	0	0+0	0	0+0	0	0+1	0
	MF	(Scotland) SCO	Willie Wilson	21	4	21+0	4	0+0	0	0+0	0	0+0	0
	FW	(Scotland) SCO	Stephen Dallas	17	3	15+1	2	1+0	1	0+0	0	0+0	0
	FW	(Scotland) SCO	Martin Glancy	34	6	24+8	6	0+0	0	0+1	0	1+0	0
	FW	(Scotland) SCO	Alan Granger	8	1	2+4	1	0+0	0	1+0	0	0+1	0
	FW	(Iceland) ISL	Hrienn Hringsson	3	3	3+0	3	0+0	0	0+0	0	0+0	0
	FW	(Scotland) SCO	Ross McCuaig	1	0	0+1	0	0+0	0	0+0	0	0+0	0
	FW	(Scotland) SCO	Jim McGall	6	0	0+6	0	0+0	0	0+0	0	0+0	0
	FW	(Scotland) SCO	Colin McKinnon	37	4	34+0	4	1+0	0	1+0	0	1+0	0
	FW	(Scotland) SCO	Martin Mooney	25	1	18+4	1	1+0	0	1+0	0	1+0	0
	FW	(Scotland) SCO	Gordon Parks	4	0	4+0	0	0+0	0	0+0	0	0+0	0
	FW	(Scotland) SCO	Robert Reilly	8	1	2+6	1	0+0	0	0+0	0	0+0	0
	FW	(Scotland) SCO	Lee Sharp	38	5	35+0	5	1+0	0	1+0	0	1+0	0
	FW	(Scotland) SCO	Hugh Ward	37	7	26+9	7	0+0	0	1+0	0	1+0	0

=== Transfers ===
==== Players in ====
Player	From	Date
(Scotland) Jim McGall	(Scotland) Arsenal BC	30 Aug 1996
(Scotland) Billy Davidson	(Scotland) Clydebank	29 Sep 1996
(Scotland) Gerry McCabe	(Scotland) Arbroath	11 Oct 1996
(Scotland) Willie Wilson	(Scotland) Ayr United	9 Nov 1996
(Scotland) Derek Barnes	(Scotland) Clydebank	14 Dec 1996
(Scotland) Gordon Parks	(Scotland) Clyde	9 Jan 1997
(Scotland) David Reid	(Scotland) Baillieston	20 Feb 1997
(Scotland) Jamie Bruce	(Scotland) East Kilbride Thistle	26 Mar 1997
(Scotland) Robert Reilly	(Scotland) Queen's Park	26 Mar 1997
(Scotland) Graeme McKenzie	(Scotland) Kilbirnie Ladeside	28 Mar 1997
(Scotland) Stephen Hamill	(Scotland) Possil YM	31 Mar 1997
(Scotland) Hrienn Hringsson	(Scotland) East Stirling (trialist)	
(Scotland) Ross McCuaig	(Scotland) Leven Valley (trialist)	
(Scotland) Adrian Mellis	(Scotland) Vale of Leven (trialist)	
(Scotland) John Scott	(Scotland) Largs Thistle (trialist)	

==== Players out ====
Player	To	Date
(Scotland) Paul Martin	(Scotland) Albion Rovers	2 Aug 1996
(Scotland) Ian MacFarlane	(Scotland) Clydebank	19 Dec 1996
(Scotland) Hugh Burns	(Scotland) Larkhall Thistle	
(Scotland) Roland Fabiani	(Scotland) Greenock	
(Scotland) Alan Foster	(Scotland) Arthurlie	
(Scotland) Charlie Gibson	(Scotland) Petershill	

== Trivia ==
- The League match against Brechin City on 31 August marked Jim Marsland's 200th appearance for Dumbarton in all national competitions - the 25th Dumbarton player to break the 'double century'.
- The League match against Ayr United on 5 October marked Ian MacFarlane's 200th appearance for Dumbarton in all national competitions - the 26th Dumbarton player to break the 'double century'.
- The League match against Livingston on 19 April marked Colin McKinnon's 100th appearance for Dumbarton in all national competitions - the 110th Dumbarton player to reach this milestone.
- Dumbarton became only the second team in Scottish League history to be relegated in successive seasons.
- For the second successive season Dumbarton matched the record fewest league home wins during a season - just two!

== See also ==
- 1996–97 in Scottish football
