= 1992–93 Dumbarton F.C. season =

Dumbarton
1992–1993 season
- Manager: Billy Lamont
- Stadium: Boghead Park, Dumbarton
- Scottish League Division 1: 9th
- Scottish Cup: Third Round
- Scottish League Cup: Second Round
- B&Q Cup: First Round
- Top goalscorer: League: John McQuade (15); All: John McQuade (15)
- Highest home attendance: 2,346
- Lowest home attendance: 550
- Average home league attendance: 1,142

Season 1992–93 was the 109th football season in which Dumbarton competed at a Scottish national level, entering the Scottish Football League for the 87th time, the Scottish Cup for the 98th time, the Scottish League Cup for the 46th time and the Scottish Challenge Cup for the third time.

== Overview ==
Following the success of the previous season, Dumbarton went into the new league campaign with some confidence, particularly as the squad of players at the start remained virtually unchanged. Within the first few months however the club were to lose the services of their top scorer (Jimmy Gilmour) and their captain (Jim Dempsey). Nevertheless, by the end of October Dumbarton were up with the leaders but thereafter the results were to become more mixed and Dumbarton fell down the table, although were never in any real danger of relegation, and finished in 9th place

In the national cup competitions, it was a case of yet another season of early exits - but not only that, there were to be no goals either. In the Scottish Cup it would be Premier Division Dundee who would end Dumbarton's ambitions in the third round.

In the League Cup, Rangers - the eventual winners of the cup - were the opponents and saw off Dumbarton easily in the second round.

Finally, it was a first round exit in the B&Q Cup - however the defeat to Hamilton would prove to be the first of that club's run to winning the cup itself.

Locally, in the Stirlingshire Cup it would be Premier Division Falkirk who would end Dumbarton's interest in the semi-final.

== Results and fixtures ==
Win Draw Loss

=== Scottish First Division ===
1 August 1992 First Division	Dumbarton	4–3	Stirling Albion	Boghead Park
	Nelson 10'; Gilmour 39'; McQuade 51' (52)		Reilly 26'; McInnes 80'	Attendance: 803; Referee: M Clark

4 August 1992 First Division	Dumbarton	1–3	Kilmarnock	Boghead Park
	McQuade 61'		Paterson 4'; Jack 13'; Tait 75'	Attendance: 2,109

8 August 1992 First Division	St Mirren	4–0	Dumbarton	Love Street (stadium)
	Baillie 21' lavety 65'; McGill 80', 89'			Attendance: 2,363; Referee: L Thow

15 August 1992 First Division	Dumbarton	0–1	Morton	Boghead Park
			Mathie 69'	Attendance: 1,257; Referee: R Tait

22 August 1992 First Division	Clydebank	0–1	Dumbarton	Kilbowie Park
			McQuade 37'	Attendance: 990; Referee: A Huett

29 August 1992 First Division	Dumbarton	1–2	Raith Rovers	Boghead Park
	Gibson 72'		Dalziel 46', 57'	Attendance: 1,105; Referee: J Herald

5 September 1992 First Division	Cowdenbeath	0–1	Dumbarton	Central Park, Cowdenbeath
			Gibson 26'	Attendance: 418; Referee: D McVicar

12 September 1992 First Division	Hamilton	3–2	Dumbarton	Douglas Park
	Miller 12'; Ward 30'; Cramb 80'		Boyd 40'; Gibson 85'	Attendance: 1,283; Referee: K Clark

19 September 1992 First Division	Dumbarton	0–3	Ayr United	Boghead Park
			Graham 20'; Traynor 42'; McTurk 90'	Attendance: 882

26 September 1992 First Division	Dunfermline Athletic	3–2	Dumbarton	East End Park
	Grant 13'; French 26'; Cooper 37'		Docherty 10'; Mooney 72'	Attendance: 2,832; Referee: M Pocock

3 October 1992 First Division	Dumbarton	3–2	Meadowbank Thistle	Boghead Park
	McQuade 30'; McAneney 68'; Foster 69'		Coughlin 39'; McLeod 72'	Attendance: 550; Referee: H Dallas

10 October 1992 First Division	Stirling Albion	1–2	Dumbarton	Annfield Stadium
	Lawrie 50'		Mooney 64' (pen.); Gibson 85'	Attendance: 475

17 October 1992 First Division	Dumbarton	4–2	St Mirren	Boghead Park
	Gibson 4'; McAneney 42', 43'; McQuade 88'		McDowall 32'; Charnley 53'	Attendance: 2,022; Referee: D Syme

24 October 1992 First Division	Dumbarton	1–0	Cowdenbeath	Boghead Park
	McQuade 10'			Attendance: 716

31 October 1992 First Division	Raith Rovers	4–1	Dumbarton	Starks Park
	Dalziel 1', 89'; McStay 15'; Nicholl 21'		Martin 9'	Attendance: 1,990; Referee: M Clark

7 November 1992 First Division	Morton	1–2	Dumbarton	Cappielow Park
	Johnstone 50'		McQuade 41'; Mooney 43'	Attendance: 1,867; Referee: J McCluskey

14 November 1992 First Division	Dumbarton	3–1	Clydebank	Boghead Park
	Mooney 34'; Martin 46'; McQuade 83'		Wilson 76'	Attendance: 1,362

21 November 1992 First Division	Ayr United	5–3	Dumbarton	Somerset Park
	Traynor 6'; Robertson 10'; Mair 48' (pen.), 67', 89'		Gibson 44'; Mooney 50', 73' (pen.)	Attendance: 1,317; Referee: J McGinlay

28 November 1992 First Division	Dumbarton	2–2	Hamilton	Boghead Park
	Mooney 21'; McQuade		Clark 11'; McDonald 50' (pen.)	Attendance: 843; Referee: W Crombie

1 December 1992 First Division	Dumbarton	0–1	Meadowbank Thistle	Boghead Park
			Wilson 18'	Attendance: 624; Referee: E Martindale

8 December 1992 First Division	Dumbarton	0–1	Dunfermline Athletic	Boghead Park
			McCathie 63'	Attendance: 1,154; Referee: J Fulton

12 December 1992 First Division	Dumbarton	0–3	Stirling Albion	Boghead Park
			Mitchell 42', 75'; Lawrie 83'	Attendance: 716

18 December 1992 First Division	Kilmarnock	1–0	Dumbarton	Rugby Park
	Campbell 55'			Attendance: 3,591

26 December 1992 First Division	Dumbarton	3–1	Morton	Boghead Park
	Meechan 46'; McQuade 47'; Boyd		Mathie 85' (pen.)	Attendance: 1,456; Referee: W Young

2 January 1993 First Division	Clydebank	3–1	Dumbarton	Kilbowie Park
	Henry 46', 90'; Flannigan 72'		Boyd 52'	Attendance: 1,368

27 January 1993 First Division	Meadowbank Thistle	3–3	Dumbarton	Meadowbank Stadium
	Rae 13'; Rutherford 66', 67'		Boag 21'; Mooney; Gow 86'	Attendance: 244; Referee: J Fulton

30 January 1993 First Division	St Mirren	2–1	Dumbarton	Love Street (stadium)
	Baillie 53'; Hewitt 56'		Gibson 55'	Attendance: 2,453; Referee: D McVicar

6 February 1993 First Division	Dumbarton	1–2	Raith Rovers	Boghead Park
	Mooney		Brewster 9'; Dalziel 88' (pen.)	Attendance: 1,201; Referee: W Young

13 February 1993 First Division	Dumbarton	1–0	Kilmarnock	Boghead Park
	Mooney 80'			Attendance: 2,346; Referee: W Crombie

20 February 1993 First Division	Dunfermline Athletic	2–2	Dumbarton	East End Park
	Grant 45'; Chambers 47'		Foster 44'; McAneney 69'	Attendance: 2,542; Referee: W Innes

23 February 1993 First Division	Cowdenbeath	0–2	Dumbarton	Central Park, Cowdenbeath
			McAneney 42'; McQuade 86'	Attendance: 222; Referee: J Herald

27 February 1993 First Division	Dumbarton	2–0	Ayr United	Boghead Park
	Boyd 28'; Mooney			Attendance: 988; Referee: R Tait

6 March 1993 First Division	Hamilton	1–1	Dumbarton	Douglas Park
	Clark 86'		McQuade 67'	Attendance: 1,261; Referee: L Mottram

9 March 1993 First Division	Stirling Albion	1–0	Dumbarton	Ochilview Park
	McCallum 80'			Attendance: 418; Referee: W Morrison

13 March 1993 First Division	Dumbarton	2–1	St Mirren	Boghead Park
	Boyd 70'; McQuade		Baillie 22'	Attendance: 1,558; Referee: D Hope

20 March 1993 First Division	Dumbarton	0–2	Clydebank	Boghead Park
			Flannigan 75'; Hay 78'	Attendance: 1,035; Referee: J Kelly

27 March 1993 First Division	Morton	2–1	Dumbarton	Cappielow Park
	Gahagan 35'; Alexander		McAneney	Attendance: 953; Referee: D McVicar

3 April 1993 First Division	Dumbarton	0–0	Cowdenbeath	Boghead Park
				Attendance: 552; Referee: J O'Hare

10 April 1993 First Division	Raith Rovers	2–0	Dumbarton	Starks Park
	Brewster 23', 48'			Attendance: 4,893

17 April 1993 First Division	Dumbarton	2–0	Hamilton	Boghead Park
	McQuade 41'; Meechan 75'			Attendance: 660; Referee: J McGillvray

24 April 1993 First Division	Ayr United	0–0	Dumbarton	Somerset Park
				Attendance: 1,525; Referee: D Syme

1 May 1993 First Division	Dumbarton	0–1	Kilmarnock	Boghead Park
			McCluskey 8'	Attendance: 3,793; Referee: R Orr

8 May 1993 First Division	Dumbarton	0–0	Dunfermline Athletic	Boghead Park
				Attendance: 1,078; Referee: C Ross

15 May 1993 First Division	Meadowbank Thistle	2–1	Dumbarton	Meadowbank Stadium
	Roseburgh 65'; Duthie		Mooney	Attendance: 234; Referee: J Timmons

=== Skol Cup ===
11 August 1992 League Cup round 2	Dumbarton	0–5	Rangers	Hampden Park
			Durrant 40'; Gordon 44'; Hateley 47'; McCoist 54'; Mikhailitchenko	Attendance: 11,090; Referee: W Morrison; Man of the Match: 79

=== B&Q Cup ===
29 September 1992 Challenge Cup R1	Dumbarton	0–3	Hamilton	Boghead Park
			Clark 9'; McDonald 65'; Reid 77'	Attendance: 634; Referee: D Hope

=== Tennant's Scottish Cup ===
10 January 1993 Cup round 3	Dundee	2–0	Dumbarton	Dens Park
	Wieghorst; Dodds (pen.)			Attendance: 4,290; Referee: C Ross

=== Stirlingshire Cup ===
25 July 1992 First Round	Dumbarton	3–1	Clydebank	Boghead Park
	Gibson 29'; Cowell 48'; Gilmour 52'		Crawford 84'	Referee: W Innes

3 May 1993 Semi-final	Falkirk	4–2	Dumbarton	Brockville Park
	Treanor 8'; Simpson; Taggart; Gow (OG)		McQuade	Attendance: 500

=== Pre-season/Other Matches ===
22 July 1992 Friendly	Dumbarton	0–1	Wolves	Boghead Park
			Roberts 2'	Referee: E Martindale

27 July 1992 Friendly	Dumbarton	0–0	Chester	Boghead Park
				Referee: D Black

== League table ==
Pos	Team	Pld	W	D	L	GF	GA	GD	Pts	Promotion or relegation
7	Ayr United	44	14	18	12	49	44	+5	46	
8	Clydebank	44	16	13	15	71	66	+5	45	
9	Dumbarton	44	15	7	22	56	71	−15	37	
10	Stirling Albion	44	11	13	20	44	61	−17	35	
11	Meadowbank Thistle (R)	44	11	10	23	51	80	−29	32	Relegation to the Second Division

Source: RSSSF and statto
Rules for classification: 1) points; 2) goal difference; 3) number of goals scored.
(R) Relegated

== Player statistics ==
=== Squad ===
No.	Pos	Nat	Player	Total		First Division		League Cup		Challenge Cup		Scottish Cup	
No.	Pos	Nat	Player	Apps	Goals	Apps	Goals	Apps	Goals	Apps	Goals	Apps	Goals
	GK	(Scotland) SCO	Ian MacFarlane	43	0	40+0	0	1+0	0	1+0	0	1+0	0
	GK	(Scotland) SCO	Mike Monaghan	4	0	4+0	0	0+0	0	0+0	0	0+0	0
	DF	(Scotland) SCO	John Boyd	39	5	35+2	5	1+0	0	0+0	0	1+0	0
	DF	(Scotland) SCO	Alan Foster	21	2	15+5	2	0+0	0	1+0	0	0+0	0
	DF	(Scotland) SCO	Stevie Gow	40	1	38+0	1	1+0	0	0+0	0	1+0	0
	DF	(Scotland) SCO	Martin Melvin	45	0	42+0	0	1+0	0	1+0	0	1+0	0
	DF	(Scotland) SCO	Fraser Wishart	2	0	2+0	0	0+0	0	0+0	0	0+0	0
	MF	(Scotland) SCO	John Boag (footballer, born 1965)	8	1	6+1	1	0+0	0	0+0	0	1+0	0
	MF	(Scotland) SCO	Jim Cowell	9	0	0+7	0	1+0	0	0+1	0	0+0	0
	MF	(Scotland) SCO	Jim Dempsey	3	0	3+0	0	0+0	0	0+0	0	0+0	0
	MF	(Scotland) SCO	Robert Docherty	33	1	26+6	1	0+0	0	1+0	0	0+0	0
	MF	(England) ENG	Willie Furphy	1	0	1+0	0	0+0	0	0+0	0	0+0	0
	MF	(Scotland) SCO	Jim Marsland	41	0	37+1	0	1+0	0	1+0	0	1+0	0
	MF	(Scotland) SCO	Paul Martin	43	2	40+0	2	1+0	0	1+0	0	1+0	0
	MF	(Scotland) SCO	Bobby McConville	25	0	17+6	0	1+0	0	0+0	0	0+1	0
	MF	(Scotland) SCO	D McDonald	4	0	3+0	0	0+0	0	1+0	0	0+0	0
	MF	(Scotland) SCO	Martin McGarvey	4	0	1+3	0	0+0	0	0+0	0	0+0	0
	MF	(Scotland) SCO	Jim Meechan	37	2	27+7	2	0+1	0	1+0	0	0+1	0
	MF	(Scotland) SCO	Mark Nelson	21	1	9+9	1	1+0	0	1+0	0	1+0	0
	MF	(Scotland) SCO	Tony Speirs	1	0	1+0	0	0+0	0	0+0	0	0+0	0
	MF	(Scotland) SCO	John Young	3	0	3+0	0	0+0	0	0+0	0	0+0	0
	FW	(Scotland) SCO	Charlie Gibson	44	7	36+6	7	1+0	0	1+0	0	0+0	0
	FW	(Scotland) SCO	Jimmy Gilmour	5	1	5+0	1	0+0	0	0+0	0	0+0	0
	FW	(Scotland) SCO	Mike McAnenay	39	6	27+11	6	0+0	0	0+0	0	1+0	0
	FW	(Scotland) SCO	John McQuade	43	15	38+2	15	1+0	0	1+0	0	1+0	0
	FW	(Scotland) SCO	Martin Mooney	35	12	27+7	12	0+0	0	0+0	0	1+0	0
	FW	(Scotland) SCO	Andy Willock	10	0	1+7	0	0+1	0	0+1	0	0+0	0

=== Transfers ===
==== Players in ====
Player	From	Date
(Scotland) Mike McAnenay	(Scotland) Hamilton	15 Aug 1992
(Scotland) Fraser Wishart	(Scotland) St Mirren	15 Aug 1992
(Scotland) Mike Monaghan	(Scotland) Hamilton	25 Aug 1992
(Scotland) D McDonald		5 Sep 1992
(Scotland) Robert Docherty	(Scotland) Stirling Albion	18 Sep 1992
(Scotland) Martin Mooney	(Scotland) Falkirk	24 Sep 1992
(Scotland) John Boag (footballer, born 1965)	(Scotland) Morton	28 Nov 1992
(England) Willie Furphy	(Scotland) Ayr United (loan)	19 Dec 1992
(Scotland) John Young	(Scotland) Vale of Leven	30 Jan 1993
(Scotland) Tony Speirs	(Scotland) East Fife	15 May 1993

==== Players out ====
Player	To	Date
(Scotland) Jim Dempsey	(Scotland) Stirling Albion	18 Sep 1992
(Scotland) Fraser Wishart	(Scotland) Falkirk	1 Nov 1992
(Scotland) David Edgar	(Scotland) Vale of Leven	
(Scotland) Colin McNair		
(Scotland) Stuart Millar	(Cyprus) Evagoras Paphos	
(Scotland) Jim Hughes		

== Reserve team ==
Dumbarton competed in the Scottish Reserve League (West), and with 8 wins and 5 draws from 28 games, finished 12th of 15.

In the Reserve League Cup, Dumbarton lost out to Hamilton in the first round.

== Trivia ==
- The League match against Clydebank on 22 August marked Martin Melvin's 100th appearance for Dumbarton in all national competitions - the 102nd Dumbarton player to reach this milestone.
- The League match against Cowdenbeath on 5 September marked John Boyd's 100th appearance for Dumbarton in all national competitions - the 103rd Dumbarton player to reach this milestone.
- The League match against Raith Rovers on 6 February marked Jim Meechan's 100th appearance for Dumbarton in all national competitions - the 104th Dumbarton player to reach this milestone.
- The League match against Raith Rovers on 10 April marked Jim Marsland's 100th appearance for Dumbarton in all national competitions - the 105th Dumbarton player to reach this milestone.
- The League match against Kilmarnock on 1 May marked Paul Martin's 100th appearance for Dumbarton in all national competitions - the 106th Dumbarton player to reach this milestone.
- In an effort to draw a bigger crowd, Dumbarton decided to play their 'home' Scottish Cup tie against Rangers at Hampden Park.
- At the end of the season Billy Lamont decided to give up the manager's post in favour of the same at Alloa - and would be replaced by Murdo MacLeod.

== See also ==
- 1992–93 in Scottish football
