= 1997–98 Dumbarton F.C. season =

Dumbarton
1997–1998 season
- Manager: Ian Wallace
- Stadium: Boghead Park, Dumbarton
- Scottish League Division 3: 10th
- Scottish Cup: Third Round
- Scottish League Cup: Second Round
- Scottish Challenge Cup: First Round
- Top goalscorer: League: Colin McKinnon (10); All: Colin McKinnon (11)
- Highest home attendance: 465
- Lowest home attendance: 310
- Average home league attendance: 391

Season 1997–98 was the 114th football season in which Dumbarton competed at a Scottish national level, entering the Scottish Football League for the 92nd time, the Scottish Cup for the 103rd time, the Scottish League Cup for the 51st time, and the Scottish Challenge Cup for the eighth time.

== Overview ==
In Ian Wallace's first full season at the helm, Dumbarton's poor financial status meant that the team was almost unchanged from the one that had dropped from the Second Division the previous season. Nevertheless, initial results were promising, but this was soon to be replaced with that well known sinking feeling as the season went on. From January, Dumbarton registered just 3 league wins, and from the end of February till the end of the season propped up the rest of the league - easily Dumbarton's worst league performance in its history.

In the national cup competitions, however, the five-year wait for some progress was brought to an end. In the Scottish Cup, an uninspiring win over Highland League outfit Lossiemouth presented Dumbarton with a tie against Premier Division Motherwell in the third round. After holding their opponents to a home draw, they battled fiercely in the replay only to lose by a single goal.

In the League Cup, old rivals Queen's Park were dispatched in the first round, before Dumbarton found Premier Division Aberdeen too hot to handle.

Finally, however, in the Challenge Cup, it was the same old story - eight seasons and eight first round defeats - Falkirk would be the victors this time.

Locally, in the Stirlingshire Cup, the format reverted to group ties, but with only one win from three ties, Dumbarton failed to reach the final.

== Results & fixtures ==
Win Draw Loss

=== Scottish Third Division ===
5 August 1997 Third Division	Cowdenbeath	0–2	Dumbarton	Central Park, Cowdenbeath
			McKinnon; Reilly	Attendance: 232

16 August 1997 Third Division	Dumbarton	2–2	Montrose	Boghead Park
	McKinnon; Ward		Winiarski; Taylor	Attendance: 395

23 August 1997 Third Division	Berwick Rangers	5–3	Dumbarton	Shielfield Park
	Forrester; Walton		McKinnon; Mellis	Attendance: 304

30 August 1997 Third Division	Dumbarton	0–1	Alloa Athletic	Boghead Park
			Wilson	Attendance: 465

13 September 1997 Third Division	Albion Rovers	2–1	Dumbarton	Cliftonhill Stadium
	Watters; Graham		Brittain	Attendance: 495

20 September 1997 Third Division	Arbroath	2–1	Dumbarton	Gayfield Park
	Cooper; Grant		Gow	Attendance: 702

27 September 1997 Third Division	Dumbarton	0–0	Queen's Park	Boghead Park
				Attendance: 436

4 October 1997 Third Division	East Stirling	3–1	Dumbarton	Firs Park
	Neill; Hunter		McKinnon	Attendance: 321

18 October 1997 Third Division	Dumbarton	2–2	Ross County	Boghead Park
	Ward		Golabek; Adam	Attendance: 452

25 October 1997 Third Division	Dumbarton	1–4	Berwick Rangers	Boghead Park
	Glancy		Fraser; Forrester; Walton	Attendance: 413

1 November 1997 Third Division	Montrose	2–2	Dumbarton	Links Park
	McGlashan; Higgins		Brittain; Sharp	Attendance: 347

8 November 1997 Third Division	Alloa Athletic	1–2	Dumbarton	Recreation Park, Alloa
	McAneney		Sharp; Grace	Attendance: 424

15 November 1997 Third Division	Dumbarton	1–1	Albion Rovers	Boghead Park
	McKinnon		Watters	Attendance: 425

22 November 1997 Third Division	Queen's Park	2–3	Dumbarton	Hampden Park
	Edgar; Conroy		McKinnon; Sharp	Attendance: 548

29 November 1997 Third Division	Dumbarton	1–2	Arbroath	Boghead Park
	Meechan		Crawford; Spence	Attendance: 379

13 December 1997 Third Division	Ross County	2–3	Dumbarton	Victoria Park, Dingwall
	Wood		Meechan; Glancy	Attendance: 1,226

20 December 1997 Third Division	Dumbarton	0–1	East Stirling	Boghead Park
			Watt	Attendance: 323

27 December 1997 Third Division	Berwick Rangers	1–1	Dumbarton	Shielfield Park
	Walton		McKinnon	Attendance: 449

10 January 1998 Third Division	Dumbarton	1–2	Cowdenbeath	Boghead Park
	Mooney		Holmes; Mitchell	Attendance: 338

17 January 1998 Third Division	Dumbarton	0–0	Queen's Park	Boghead Park
				Attendance: 408

31 January 1998 Third Division	Arbroath	2–2	Dumbarton	Gayfield Park
	Burns; Tindal		Meechan; Grace	Attendance: 666

4 February 1998 Third Division	Dumbarton	0–1	Ross County	Boghead Park
			Adams	Attendance: 447

17 February 1998 Third Division	East Stirling	1–0	Dumbarton	Firs Park
	Hunter			Attendance: 181

21 February 1998 Third Division	Cowdenbeath	2–0	Dumbarton	Central Park, Cowdenbeath
	Stewart; Winter			Attendance: 255

25 February 1998 Third Division	Dumbarton	2–3	Montrose	Boghead Park
	Mooney; McKinnon		Taylor; McGlashan	Attendance: 315

28 February 1998 Third Division	Dumbarton	0–3	Alloa Athletic	Boghead Park
			Cameron; McKechnie	Attendance: 396

7 March 1998 Third Division	Albion Rovers	2–2	Dumbarton	Cliftonhill Stadium
	Watters; Donaldson		Sharp; Grace	Attendance: 417

14 March 1998 Third Division	Queen's Park	0–2	Dumbarton	Hampden Park
			Sharp; Grace	Attendance: 528

21 March 1998 Third Division	Dumbarton	1–2	Arbroath	Boghead Park
	Sharp		Spence	Attendance: 383

28 March 1998 Third Division	Ross County	0–0	Dumbarton	Victoria Park, Dingwall
				Attendance: 1,475

21 March 1998 Third Division	Dumbarton	1–0	East Stirling	Boghead Park
	Wilson			Attendance: 338

11 April 1998 Third Division	Alloa Athletic	3–0	Dumbarton	Recreation Park, Alloa
	Haddow; Irvine; McKechnie			Attendance: 538

18 April 1998 Third Division	Dumbarton	2–0	Albion Rovers	Boghead Park
	Mooney; Meechan			Attendance: 398

25 April 1998 Third Division	Dumbarton	0–2	Berwick Rangers	Boghead Park
			Walton; Neil	Attendance: 310

2 May 1998 Third Division	Montrose	2–1	Dumbarton	Links Park
	Henry; Higgins		Mooney	Attendance: 305

25 April 1998 Third Division	Dumbarton	2–3	Cowdenbeath	Boghead Park
	Mooney; McKinnon		Ritchie; Welsh; Murray	Attendance: 413

=== Coca-Cola Cup ===
2 August 1997 League Cup round 1	Dumbarton	1–1 (a.e.t.) (6-5 p)	Queen's Park	Boghead Park
	Bruce		Edgar	Attendance: 544; Referee: G Allison

9 August 1997 League Cup round 2	Dumbarton	1–5	Aberdeen	Boghead Park
	McKinnon		Jess; Miller; Newell	Attendance: 1,739; Referee: J McCluskey

=== Scottish Challenge Cup ===
12 August 1997 Challenge Cup round 1	Dumbarton	0-2	Falkirk	Boghead Park
			Corrigan; McGraw	Attendance: 447; Referee: K Clark

=== Tennent's Scottish Cup ===
3 January 1998 Cup round 2	Lossiemouth	0–1	Dumbarton	Grant Park, Lossiemouth
			McCuiag	Attendance: 509; Referee: K Bisset

24 January 1998 Cup round 3	Dumbarton	1–1	Motherwell	Boghead Park
	Sharp		McSkimming	Attendance: 2,412; Referee: B Tait

27 January 1998 Cup round 3R	Motherwell	1–0	Dumbarton	Fir Park
	Coyle			Attendance: 4,202; Referee: B Tait

=== Stirlingshire Cup ===
22 July 1997 Group stage	Dumbarton	0–2	Stenhousemuir	Boghead Park
			Banks 48' (pen.); Farrell 80'	Attendance: 181; Referee: M McGarry

26 July 1997 Group stage	Dumbarton	1–2	Alloa Athletic	Boghead Park
	Glancy 90'		McCulloch 28'; Mathieson 70'

18 August 1997 Group stage	Dumbarton	4–1	Stirling Albion	Boghead Park
	Grace; Glancy; Ward		Goal

=== Pre-season/Other Matches ===
19 July 1997 Friendly	Dumbarton	2–3	Morton	Boghead Park
	Ward (pen.); Glancy		Goal

21 July 1997 Friendly	Dumbarton	3–2	(England) Norwich City	Boghead Park
	Ward 25', 67'; Mellis 82'		Simpson 60'; Marshall 83'

28 July 1997 Friendly	Dumbarton	0–0	Clydebank	Boghead Park

20 October 1997 Friendly	Dumbarton	3–1	(China) Vanguard Hao Doa	Boghead Park
	Grace; Glancy; McKinnon		Wu Wen Bing 50'

== League table ==
Pos	Team	Pld	W	D	L	GF	GA	GD	Pts
6	Berwick Rangers	36	10	12	14	47	55	−8	42
7	Queen's Park	36	10	11	15	42	55	−13	41
8	Cowdenbeath	36	12	2	22	33	57	−24	38
9	Montrose	36	10	8	18	53	80	−27	38
10	Dumbarton	36	7	10	19	42	61	−19	31

Source: Soccerway
Rules for classification: 1) points; 2) goal difference; 3) number of goals scored.

== Player statistics ==
=== Squad ===
No.	Pos	Nat	Player	Total		Third Division		League Cup		Challenge Cup		Scottish Cup	
No.	Pos	Nat	Player	Apps	Goals	Apps	Goals	Apps	Goals	Apps	Goals	Apps	Goals
	GK	(Scotland) SCO	Derek Barnes	6	0	6+0	0	0+0	0	0+0	0	0+0	0
	GK	(Scotland) SCO	Kenny Meechan	36	0	30+0	0	2+0	0	1+0	0	3+0	0
	DF	(Scotland) SCO	Craig Brittain	29	2	23+0	2	2+0	0	1+0	0	3+0	0
	DF	(Scotland) SCO	Jamie Bruce	27	1	21+1	0	2+0	1	0+0	0	3+0	0
	DF	(Scotland) SCO	Tom Currie	16	0	15+0	0	0+0	0	0+0	0	1+0	0
	DF	(Scotland) SCO	Chris Dalrymple	3	0	3+0	0	0+0	0	0+0	0	0+0	0
	DF	(Scotland) SCO	Billy Davidson	6	0	4+2	0	0+0	0	0+0	0	0+0	0
	DF	(Scotland) SCO	Stevie Gow	25	1	21+0	1	2+0	0	0+0	0	2+0	0
	DF	(Scotland) SCO	Alex Grace	32	4	23+5	4	0+1	0	0+1	0	1+1	0
	DF	(Scotland) SCO	Stephen Hamill	1	0	0+0	0	0+0	0	0+1	0	0+0	0
	DF	(Scotland) SCO	Stephen Jack	12	0	11+1	0	0+0	0	0+0	0	0+0	0
	DF	(Scotland) SCO	Martin Melvin	3	0	1+0	0	0+1	0	1+0	0	0+0	0
	DF	(Scotland) SCO	David Reid	17	0	15+1	0	0+0	0	0+1	0	0+0	0
	MF	(Scotland) SCO	Jim Meechan	41	5	36+0	5	2+0	0	0+0	0	3+0	0
	MF	(Scotland) SCO	Adrian Mellis	19	1	5+11	1	1+0	0	1+0	0	0+1	0
	MF	(Scotland) SCO	Billy Melvin	7	0	7+0	0	0+0	0	0+0	0	0+0	0
	MF	(Sweden) SWE	Robert Prytz	3	0	3+0	0	0+0	0	0+0	0	0+0	0
	MF	(Scotland) SCO	Willie Wilson	38	1	30+2	1	2+0	0	1+0	0	3+0	0
	FW	(Scotland) SCO	Chris Ewing	2	0	1+1	0	0+0	0	0+0	0	0+0	0
	FW	(Scotland) SCO	Marc Falconer	8	0	6+2	0	0+0	0	0+0	0	0+0	0
	FW	(Scotland) SCO	Paddy Flannery	13	0	5+6	0	0+0	0	0+0	0	2+0	0
	FW	(Scotland) SCO	Martin Glancy	26	2	11+10	2	2+0	0	1+0	0	0+2	0
	FW	(Iceland) ISL	Hrienn Hringsson	2	0	2+0	0	0+0	0	0+0	0	0+0	0
	FW	(Scotland) SCO	Ross McCuaig	18	1	12+4	0	0+0	0	0+0	0	2+0	1
	FW	(Scotland) SCO	Colin McKinnon	39	11	32+1	10	2+0	1	1+0	0	3+0	0
	FW	(Scotland) SCO	Martin Mooney	36	5	26+4	5	2+0	0	1+0	0	3+0	0
	FW	(Finland) FIN	Tommi Orismaa	1	0	0+1	0	0+0	0	0+0	0	0+0	0
	FW	(Scotland) SCO	Robert Reilly	10	1	4+2	1	1+1	0	1+0	0	0+1	0
	FW	(Scotland) SCO	Lee Sharp	40	8	34+0	7	2+0	0	1+0	0	3+0	1
	FW	(Scotland) SCO	Hugh Ward	26	3	9+11	3	0+2	0	1+0	0	1+2	0

=== Transfers ===
==== Players in ====
Player	From	Date
(Scotland) Adrian Mellis	(Scotland) Vale of Leven	11 Jun 1997
(Scotland) Craig Brittain	(Scotland) Ashfield	14 Jun 1997
(Scotland) Alex Grace	(Scotland) Vale of Leven	25 Jul 1997
(Sweden) Robert Prytz	(Scotland) Kilmarnock	30 Aug 1997
(Scotland) Marc Falconer	(Scotland) Queen's Park	1 Sep 1997
(Scotland) Tom Currie	(Scotland) Clydebank	18 Oct 1997
(Scotland) Chris Ewing	(Scotland) Stranraer	18 Oct 1997
(Iceland) Hrienn Hringsson	(Scotland) East Stirling	1 Nov 1997
(Scotland) Ross McCuaig	(Scotland) Leven Valley	21 Nov 1997
(Scotland) Paddy Flannery	(Scotland) Morton	27 Dec 1997
(Scotland) Stephen Jack	(Scotland) Cowdenbeath	25 Feb 1998
(Scotland) Billy Melvin	(Scotland) Clydebank	27 Mar 1998
(Finland) Tommi Orismaa	(Finland) TPS	30 Mar 1998
(Scotland) Chris Dalrymple	(Scotland) Yoker Athletic (trialist)	

==== Players out ====
Player	To	Date
(Scotland) Gordon Parks	(Scotland) East Stirling	4 Jun 1997
(Scotland) Toby King	(Scotland) Clyde	10 Jun 1997
(Sweden) Robert Prytz	(Scotland) Cowdenbeath	20 Dec 1997
(Scotland) Hugh Ward	(Scotland) Clydebank	27 Mar 1998
(Scotland) Martin McGarvey	(Scotland) Arthurlie	
(Scotland) Stephen Dallas	(Scotland) Baillieston	
(Scotland) Sam McGivern	(Scotland) Dalry Thistle	
(Scotland) Graeme McKenzie	(Scotland) Kilbirnie Ladeside	
(Scotland) Alan Granger	(Scotland) Petershill	
(Scotland) Peter Dennison	(Scotland) Vale of Leven	
(Scotland) Joe Goldie	(Scotland) Vale of Leven	
(Scotland) Jim McGall	(Scotland) Vale of Leven	
(Scotland) Adrian Mellis	(Scotland) Vale of Leven	

== Trivia ==
- The League Cup match against Queen's Park on 2 August marked Hugh Ward's 100th appearance for Dumbarton in all national competitions - the 111th Dumbarton player to reach this milestone.
- The League match against East Stirling on 20 December marked Martin Mooney's 200th appearance for Dumbarton in all national competitions - the 27th Dumbarton player to break the 'double century'.
- For the third successive season Dumbarton matched the record fewest league home wins during a season - just two!

== See also ==
- 1997–98 in Scottish football
