= 1998–99 Dumbarton F.C. season =

Dumbarton
1998–1999 season
- Manager: Ian Wallace/Jimmy Brown
- Stadium: Boghead Park, Dumbarton
- Scottish League Division 3: 4th
- Scottish Cup: First Round
- Scottish League Cup: First Round
- Top goalscorer: League: Paddy Flannery (17); All: Paddy Flannery (18)
- Highest home attendance: 650
- Lowest home attendance: 230
- Average home league attendance: 391

Season 1998–99 was the 115th football season in which Dumbarton competed at a Scottish national level, entering the Scottish Football League for the 93rd time, the Scottish Cup for the 104th time and the Scottish League Cup for the 52nd time.

== Overview ==
Following three successive seasons of failure, Dumbarton produced what would be a marginally better league performance. Indeed, up until the beginning of April it was still technically possible for Dumbarton to have gained promotion, but in the end ran out of games. The season was improved by an end of season streak which saw 7 wins taken from the last 9 games, and eventually a 4th place was achieved. The winning run coincided with Ian Wallace's replacement by Jimmy Brown as manager, this following a suspension and subsequent internal investigation.

In the national cup competitions, it was a return to first round exits. In the Scottish Cup, Dumbarton lost to Livingston after a creditable drawn match.

In the League Cup, there was a disappointing first round defeat to Alloa Athletic.

Note that due to the lack of sponsorship, the Scottish Challenge Cup was not played.

Locally, in the Stirlingshire Cup, Dumbarton managed a draw from two ties and thus failed to reach the final.

== Results & fixtures ==
Win Draw Loss

=== Scottish Third Division ===
4 August 1998 Third Division	Dumbarton	2–0	Albion Rovers	Boghead Park
	McKinnon; Flannery			Attendance: 291

15 August 1998 Third Division	Queen's Park	0–1	Dumbarton	Hampden Park
			Sharp	Attendance: 656

22 August 1998 Third Division	Dumbarton	0–2	Stenhousemuir	Boghead Park
			Hamilton	Attendance: 378

29 August 1998 Third Division	Dumbarton	0–0	Berwick Rangers	Boghead Park
				Attendance: 303

5 September 1998 Third Division	East Stirling	1–2	Dumbarton	Firs Park
	McNeill		King; Robertson	Attendance: 217

12 September 1998 Third Division	Brechin City	0–0	Dumbarton	Glebe Park, Brechin
				Attendance: 355

19 September 1998 Third Division	Dumbarton	5–0	Cowdenbeath	Boghead Park
	Sharp; Melvin; McKinnon; Flannery			Attendance: 348

26 September 1998 Third Division	Montrose	1–1	Dumbarton	Links Park
	Coulston		Flannery	Attendance: 318

3 October 1998 Third Division	Dumbarton	1–2	Ross County	Boghead Park
	Flannery		McBain; Ferries	Attendance: 538

10 October 1998 Third Division	Dumbarton	1–0	Queen's Park	Boghead Park
	Flannery			Attendance: 343

17 October 1998 Third Division	Dumbarton	3–0	Stenhousemuir	Boghead Park
	Glancy; Flannery; Mooney			Attendance: 456

24 October 1998 Third Division	Berwick Rangers	3–1	Dumbarton	Shielfield Park
	Ramage; Leask		Robertson	Attendance: 303

31 October 1998 Third Division	Dumbarton	2–2	East Stirling	Boghead Park
	Flannery; Robertson		Muirhead (OG)	Attendance: 309

7 November 1998 Third Division	Cowdenbeath	0–2	Dumbarton	Central Park, Cowdenbeath
			Flannery	Attendance: 228

14 November 1998 Third Division	Dumbarton	1–2	Brechin City	Boghead Park
	Flannery		Sorbie; Dickson	Attendance: 357

28 November 1998 Third Division	Dumbarton	0–2	Montrose	Boghead Park
			Niddrie; Paterson	Attendance: 240

28 November 1998 Third Division	Ross County	2–0	Dumbarton	Victoria Park, Dingwall
	Taylor; Ferguson			Attendance: 324

12 December 1998 Third Division	Dumbarton	2–0	Albion Rovers	Boghead Park
	Flannery; Mooney			Attendance: 324

19 December 1998 Third Division	Dumbarton	1–4	Stenhousemuir	Boghead Park
	Wilson		Baptie; Gibson; Hamilton; Christie	Attendance: 283

16 January 1999 Third Division	Montrose	4–2	Dumbarton	Links Park
	Lyon; Duffy; Craig		Flannery	Attendance: 326

26 January 1999 Third Division	East Stirling	1–2	Dumbarton	Firs Park
	Muirhead		Brittain; Melvin	Attendance: 204

30 January 1999 Third Division	Dumbarton	0–0	Ross County	Boghead Park
				Attendance: 400

2 February 1999 Third Division	Dumbarton	1–1	Berwick Rangers	Boghead Park
	Flannery		Watt	Attendance: 242

13 February 1999 Third Division	Brechin City	3–3	Dumbarton	Glebe Park, Brechin
	Sorbie; Dickson; McKellar		Grace; Mooney; Gow	Attendance: 360

27 February 1999 Third Division	Queen's Park	1–1	Dumbarton	Hampden Park
	Martin		Bradford	Attendance: 516

6 March 1999 Third Division	Dumbarton	0–2	East Stirling	Boghead Park
			Muirhead; Paterson	Attendance: 246

9 March 1999 Third Division	Dumbarton	1–1	Albion Rovers	Boghead Park
	McKinnon		Blair	Attendance: 230

13 March 1999 Third Division	Berwick Rangers	0–1	Dumbarton	Shielfield Park
			Flannery	Attendance: 321

20 March 1999 Third Division	Ross County	1–2	Dumbarton	Victoria Park, Dingwall
	Tarrant		Robertson; Bradford	Attendance: 2,374

3 April 1999 Third Division	Dumbarton	2–1	Montrose	Boghead Park
	Robertson		Craig	Attendance: 541

5 April 1999 Third Division	Dumbarton	6–1	Cowdenbeath	Boghead Park
	Jack; Flannery; King; Smith; Stewart		Brown	Attendance: 650

10 April 1999 Third Division	Cowdenbeath	2–1	Dumbarton	Central Park, Cowdenbeath
	Stewart; Milne		Smith	Attendance: 245

17 April 1999 Third Division	Dumbarton	2–0	Brechin City	Boghead Park
	Robertson; Smith			Attendance: 562

24 April 1999 Third Division	Dumbarton	2–0	Stenhousemuir	Boghead Park
	Flannery; Mooney			Attendance: 629

1 May 1999 Third Division	Dumbarton	0–1	Queen's Park	Boghead Park
			McGuffie	Attendance: 762

8 May 1999 Third Division	Albion Rovers	0–2	Dumbarton	Cliftonhill Stadium
			Robertson; Bruce	Attendance: 256

=== Scottish League Cup ===
1 August 1998 League Cup round 1	Dumbarton	0–4	Alloa Athletic	Boghead Park
			Wilson; Simpson; McKechnie; Cameron	Attendance: 352; Referee: E Martindale

=== Tennent's Scottish Cup ===
5 December 1998 Cup round 1	Dumbarton	1–1	Livingston	Boghead Park
	Flannery		Miller	Attendance: 530; Referee: J Fleming

8 December 1998 Cup round 1R	Livingston	3–0	Dumbarton	Almondvale Stadium
	Wilson (OG); Fleming; Bingham			Attendance: 1,449; Referee: J Fleming

=== Stirlingshire Cup ===
23 July 1998 Group stage	Stirling Albion	1–0	Dumbarton	Forthbank Stadium
	Bone 50'			Referee: J Fleming

25 August 1998 Group stage	Dumbarton	2–2	Falkirk	Boghead Park
	Mooney; Robertson		Cunning 15'; Hutchison 74'

=== Pre-season Matches ===
25 July 1998 Friendly	Dumbarton	3–1	Ardeer Recreation	Boghead Park
	Flannery; Sharp		Goal

== League table ==
Pos	Team	Pld	W	D	L	GF	GA	GD	Pts	Promotion
2	Stenhousemuir (P)	36	19	7	10	62	42	+20	64	Promotion to the Second Division
3	Brechin City	36	17	7	12	47	44	+3	58	
4	Dumbarton	36	16	9	11	53	40	+13	57	
5	Berwick Rangers	36	12	14	10	53	49	+4	50	
6	Queen's Park	36	11	11	14	41	46	−5	44	

Source: "1998-1999 Third Division - SPFL Archive". SPFL.
Rules for classification: 1) points; 2) goal difference; 3) number of goals scored.
(P) Promoted

== Player statistics ==
=== Squad ===
No.	Pos	Nat	Player	Total		Third Division		League Cup		Scottish Cup	
No.	Pos	Nat	Player	Apps	Goals	Apps	Goals	Apps	Goals	Apps	Goals
	GK	(Scotland) SCO	Derek Barnes	3	0	1+0	0	0+0	0	2+0	0
	GK	(Scotland) SCO	Peter Dennison	2	0	2+0	0	0+0	0	0+0	0
	GK	(Scotland) SCO	Kenny Meechan	34	0	33+0	0	1+0	0	0+0	0
	DF	(Scotland) SCO	Craig Brittain	26	1	22+1	1	1+0	0	2+0	0
	DF	(Scotland) SCO	Jamie Bruce	17	1	17+0	1	0+0	0	0+0	0
	DF	(Scotland) SCO	Tom Currie	1	0	0+0	0	1+0	0	0+0	0
	DF	(Scotland) SCO	Paul Finnigan	3	0	1+2	0	0+0	0	0+0	0
	DF	(Scotland) SCO	Stevie Gow	12	1	6+3	1	1+0	0	2+0	0
	DF	(Scotland) SCO	Alex Grace	23	1	18+2	1	1+0	0	2+0	0
	DF	(Scotland) SCO	Stephen Jack	38	1	35+0	1	1+0	0	2+0	0
	DF	(Scotland) SCO	Martin Melvin	12	0	2+9	0	0+1	0	0+0	0
	DF	(Scotland) SCO	David Reid	11	0	9+1	0	0+1	0	0+0	0
	DF	(Scotland) SCO	Dave Stewart	10	1	9+1	1	0+0	0	0+0	0
	DF	(Scotland) SCO	Barry Wilkinson	7	0	4+2	0	0+0	0	0+1	0
	MF	(Scotland) SCO	Alan Brown	8	0	2+5	0	0+1	0	0+0	0
	MF	(Scotland) SCO	Paul Harvey	11	0	7+2	0	0+0	0	2+0	0
	MF	(Scotland) SCO	Billy Melvin	33	3	24+6	3	1+0	0	0+2	0
	MF	(Scotland) SCO	Willie Wilson	38	1	35+0	1	1+0	0	2+0	0
	FW	(Scotland) SCO	John Bradford	4	2	4+0	2	0+0	0	0+0	0
	FW	(Scotland) SCO	Paddy Flannery	35	18	33+0	17	0+0	0	2+0	1
	FW	(Scotland) SCO	Martin Glancy	10	1	5+5	1	0+0	0	0+0	0
	FW	(Scotland) SCO	Toby King	31	3	29+0	3	0+0	0	2+0	0
	FW	(Scotland) SCO	Colin McKinnon	30	3	27+0	3	1+0	0	2+0	0
	FW	(Scotland) SCO	Keith Millar	11	0	2+7	0	0+0	0	2+0	0
	FW	(Scotland) SCO	Martin Mooney	32	4	28+4	4	0+0	0	0+0	0
	FW	(Scotland) SCO	Joe Robertson	28	8	21+5	8	0+0	0	0+2	0
	FW	(Scotland) SCO	Lee Sharp	18	2	17+0	2	1+0	0	0+0	0
	FW	(Scotland) SCO	Chris Smith	10	3	3+6	3	1+0	0	0+0	0

=== Transfers ===
==== Players in ====
Player	From	Date
(Scotland) Chris Smith	(Scotland) Rutherglen Glencairn	31 Jul 1998
(Scotland) Joe Robertson	(Scotland) Clydebank	14 Aug 1998
(Scotland) Alan Brown	(Scotland) Yoker Athletic	4 Sep 1998
(Scotland) Keith Millar	(Scotland) Yoker Athletic	4 Sep 1998
(Scotland) Paul Harvey	(Scotland) Raith Rovers (loan)	1 Oct 1998
(Scotland) John Bradford	(Scotland) Ayr United (loan)	22 Feb 1999
(Scotland) Paul Finnigan	(Scotland) Ashfield	31 Mar 1999
(Scotland) Barry Wilkinson	(Scotland) Cumnock	31 Mar 1999
(Scotland) Dave Stewart	(Scotland) Ayr United (trialist)	

==== Players out ====
Player	To	Date
(Scotland) Lee Sharp	(Scotland) Dundee	3 Dec 1998
(Scotland) Paul Harvey	(Scotland) Livingston	6 Feb 1999
(Scotland) Martin Glancy	(Scotland) Inverness CT	18 Feb 1999
(Scotland) Colin McKinnon	(Scotland) Stenhousemuir	13 Mar 1999
(Scotland) Marc Falconer	(Scotland) Armadale Thistle	
(Scotland) Robert Reilly	(Scotland) Cumnock	
(Iceland) Hrienn Hringsson	(Iceland) KA Akureyri	
(Scotland) Tom Currie	(Scotland) Kilwinning Rangers	
(Scotland) Billy Davidson	(Scotland) Largs Thistle	
(Scotland) Chris Dalrymple	(Scotland) Vale of Leven	
(Scotland) Ross McCuaig	(Scotland) Vale of Leven	
(Finland) Tommi Orismaa		
(Scotland) Stephen Hamill		
(Scotland) Jim Meechan		

== Trivia ==
- The League match against Brechin City on 12 September marked Lee Sharp's 100th appearance for Dumbarton in all national competitions - the 112th Dumbarton player to reach this milestone.
- The League match against Cowdenbeath on 7 November marked Toby King's 100th appearance for Dumbarton in all national competitions - the 113th Dumbarton player to reach this milestone.

== See also ==
- 1998–99 in Scottish football
