= 1993–94 Scottish First Division =

Scottish First Division
- Season: 1993–94
- Champions: Falkirk
- Promoted: Falkirk
- Relegated: Dumbarton; Stirling Albion; Clyde; Morton; Brechin City
- Matches played: 264
- Goals scored: 655 (2.48 per match)
- Top goalscorer: Peter Duffield (20)
- Biggest home win: Hamilton Academical 9 Brechin City 1, 26.03.1994
- Biggest away win: Morton 1 Falkirk 5, 14.08.1993

The 1993–94 Scottish First Division season was won by Falkirk, who were promoted one point ahead of Dunfermline Athletic. This was the last season that two points were awarded for a win; in subsequent seasons three points were awarded for a win. Due to a league restructuring, five teams, Dumbarton, Stirling Albion, Clyde, Morton and Brechin City were relegated.

== League table ==
Pos	Team	Pld	W	D	L	GF	GA	GD	Pts	Promotion or relegation
1	Falkirk (C, P)	44	26	14	4	81	32	+49	66	Promotion to the Premier Division
2	Dunfermline Athletic	44	29	7	8	93	35	+58	65	
3	Airdrieonians	44	20	14	10	58	38	+20	54	
4	Hamilton Academical	44	19	12	13	66	54	+12	50	
5	Clydebank	44	18	14	12	56	48	+8	50	
6	St Mirren	44	21	8	15	42	48	−6	50	
7	Ayr United	44	14	14	16	42	52	−10	42	
8	Dumbarton (R)	44	11	14	19	48	59	−11	36	Relegation to the Second Division
9	Stirling Albion (R)	44	13	9	22	41	68	−27	35	Relegation to the Second Division
10	Clyde (R)	44	10	12	22	35	58	−23	32	Relegation to the Second Division
11	Morton (R)	44	6	17	21	44	75	−31	29	Relegation to the Second Division
12	Brechin City (R)	44	6	7	31	30	81	−51	19	Relegation to the Second Division

Source: RSSSF and statto
Rules for classification: 1) points; 2) goal difference; 3) number of goals scored.
(C) Champions; (P) Promoted; (R) Relegated
