= Gerry McCabe =

Scottish footballer and coach

Personal information
- Date of birth: 26 September 1956 (age 70)
- Place of birth: Hamilton, Scotland
- Position: Midfielder

Youth career
- 1975–1977: Hibernian

Senior career*
Years	Team	Apps	(Gls)
1977–1980	Clyde	96	(14)
1980–1986	Clydebank	216	(21)
1986–1988	Hamilton Academical	65	(9)
1987	→ Dumbarton (loan)	6	(1)
1988–1990	Clyde	61	(7)
1990	Victoria Vistas	20	(7)
1990–1991	Hamilton Academical	16	(0)
1991–1993	Cork City	63	(2)
1993–1995	Glentoran		
1995–1996	Arbroath	19	(0)
1996–1997	Dumbarton	4	(0)
Total		483	(52)

Managerial career
- 2004: Hibernian (caretaker)
- 2006–2007: Dumbarton
- * Club domestic league appearances and goals

Gerry McCabe (born 26 September 1956) is a Scottish football player and coach.

== Playing career ==
McCabe had a lengthy playing career that lasted almost two decades. He made over 200 league appearances for a Clydebank side that steamrollered through the divisions to the Scottish Premier Division. In 1977, he played abroad in the National Soccer League with Windsor Stars, and the following season with Toronto Italia. In 1990, he played with the Victoria Vistas. Towards the end of his playing career, he started coaching Celtic youth players.

== Coaching career ==
After retiring as a player McCabe worked as assistant manager to Bobby Williamson at Kilmarnock. McCabe then went on to be assistant manager to Williamson at his next two managerial positions at Hibernian and Plymouth Argyle. McCabe was the caretaker manager of Hibernian when Williamson moved to Plymouth before the end of the 2003–04 season. McCabe then rejoined Williamson at Plymouth at the start of the 2004–05 season.

McCabe became manager of Dumbarton in 2006 when he replaced Paul Martin. McCabe promised a more attacking approach differing from the defensive style that Martin had employed. He also had the difficult but widely expected task of gaining promotion after only one season in the Scottish Third Division. McCabe signed former Kilmarnock Scottish Cup winner David Bagan and Stephen Dobbie on loan from St Johnstone. Dobbie scored 10 goals in 17 league games which pushed Dumbarton into a high league position. However Dobbie's loan spell ended in December 2006. Any chances of a loan extension were dashed when Dobbie signed permanently for Scottish First Division side Queen of the South. After Dobbie's departure the goals dried up and Dumbarton just fell short of a promotion play-off place and finished in fifth place. McCabe succeeded in leading Dumbarton to a Scottish Cup 3rd round tie against SPL champions Celtic which they lost 4–0. McCabe also led Dumbarton to a League Cup clash against another SPL team, Inverness Caley Thistle eventually losing the match 3–1.

In the 2007 pre-season, Dumbarton were considered one of the promotion favourites. However, after a succession of players left the club, including popular goalkeeper Stephen Grindlay, defender Chris Boyle and winger Ryan Borris, McCabe found it hard to replace them. Lack of goals was evident in the league when new signings Brian McPhee and David McFarlane failed to hit the net on a regular basis. This led to Dumbarton sitting third bottom of the league. With only 3 wins out of 11 league games, McCabe was dismissed in November 2007 after only 18 months at the Strathclyde Homes Stadium.

In January 2008, McCabe was appointed assistant manager to player-manager Jim McIntyre at Dunfermline. McCabe continued as assistant manager when Jim Jefferies was appointed Dunfermline's manager but left the club in March 2013 after it entered administration.

McCabe was appointed Queen of the South's assistant manager to McIntyre on 28 June 2013. After one season in Dumfries, McCabe moved to Dundee to become assistant to Paul Hartley.

== Honours ==
Cork City

- League of Ireland Premier Division
  - 1992–93: 1

== Managerial statistics ==
As of November 2007

Team	Nat	From	To	Record				
Team	Nat	From	To	G	W	D	L	Win %
Dumbarton	(Scotland)	June 2006	November 2007	57	25	11	21	43.86
