= Charlie Gibson (footballer) =

Scottish footballer

Personal information
- Full name: Charles Gibson
- Date of birth: 21 June 1961 (age 65)
- Place of birth: Dumbarton, Scotland
- Position: Centre forward

Youth career
- –1981: St Anthony's

Senior career*
Years	Team	Apps	(Gls)
1981–1982	Shrewsbury Town	6	(0)
1982–1985	East Stirlingshire	88	(25)
1985–1987	Clydebank	33	(3)
1986–1987	→ Stenhousemuir (loan)	5	(0)
1986–1989	Stirling Albion	103	(38)
1989–1996	Dumbarton	235	(60)
- Petershill
- * Club domestic league appearances and goals

Charles Gibson (born 21 June 1961) is a Scottish former footballer who made 240 Scottish League appearances as a centre forward for Dumbarton. He also played in the Scottish League for East Stirlingshire, Clydebank, Stenhousemuir, Stirling Albion and in the Football League for Shrewsbury Town.

== Personal life ==
As of 2015, Gibson was working as a personnel officer in Helensburgh.

== Career statistics ==
Appearances and goals by club, season and competition
Club	Season	League			National Cup		League Cup		Other		Total	
Club	Season	Division	Apps	Goals	Apps	Goals	Apps	Goals	Apps	Goals	Apps	Goals
Clydebank	1984–85	Scottish First Division	14	2	0	0	—		—		14	2
Clydebank	1985–86	Scottish Premier Division	17	1	2	0	0	0	—		19	1
Clydebank	1986–87	Scottish Premier Division	3	0	0	0	0	0	—		3	0
Clydebank	Total		34	3	2	0	0	0	—		36	3
Dumbarton	1989–90	Scottish Second Division	36	20	2	0	2	1	0	0	40	21
Dumbarton	1990–91	Scottish Second Division	26	4	2	0	1	0	1 (Note: Appearance in Scottish Challenge Cup)	0	30	4
Dumbarton	1991–92	Scottish Second Division	37	8	3	0	2	2	1	1	43	11
Dumbarton	1992–93	Scottish First Division	42	7	0	0	1	0	1	0	44	7
Dumbarton	1993–94	Scottish First Division	43	13	1	0	1	0	0	0	45	13
Dumbarton	1994–95	Scottish Second Division	22	6	0	0	1	0	1	0	24	6
Dumbarton	1995–96	Scottish First Division	29	2	1	0	1	0	1	0	33	2
Dumbarton	Total		235	60	9	0	9	3	5	1	258	64
Career total			269	63	11	0	9	3	5	1	294	67

== Honours ==
Clydebank

- Scottish League Second Division second-place promotion: 1984–85

Dumbarton

- Scottish League Second Division: 1991–92
- Scottish League Second Division second-place promotion: 1994–95
