= Tommy Walker (footballer, born 1964) =

Scottish footballer

Personal information
- Full name: Thomas Walker
- Date of birth: 23 December 1964 (age 61)
- Place of birth: Glasgow, Scotland
- Position: Centre forward

Youth career
- Eastercraigs

Senior career*
Years	Team	Apps	(Gls)
1987–1994	Ayr United	198	(55)
1993–1994	Dumbarton	8	(1)
1993–1996	Stranraer	75	(12)
1996–1998	Albion Rovers	24	(6)
- * Club domestic league appearances and goals

Thomas Walker (born 23 December 1964) was a Scottish footballer who played for Ayr United, Dumbarton, Stranraer and Albion Rovers.
