= Eddie Cunnington =

Scottish footballer (born 1969)

Personal information
- Full name: Edward Alfred Cunnington
- Date of birth: 12 November 1969 (age 56)
- Place of birth: Bellshill, Scotland
- Position: Left back

Youth career
- 1987–1990: Chelsea

Senior career*
Years	Team	Apps	(Gls)
1990–1993	Dunfermline Athletic	84	(0)
1993–1994	Dumbarton	13	(3)
1994–1996	Glentoran	30	(6)
1996–1997	Coleraine		
1997–2000	Hamilton Academical	101	(7)
2000–2001	Ross County	24	(0)
2001–2003	Hamilton Academical	35	(0)
2003–2004	Cumnock Juniors		
Total		287	(16)
- * Club domestic league appearances and goals

Eddie Cunnington (born 12 November 1969) is a Scottish former footballer, who played for Chelsea, Dunfermline, Dumbarton, Glentoran, Coleraine, Hamilton and Ross County.
