= Mike Hendry =

Scottish footballer (born 1965)

Personal information
- Full name: Michael Hendry
- Date of birth: 20 December 1965 (age 60)
- Place of birth: Bishopton, Scotland
- Position: Forward

Youth career
- Arthurlie

Senior career*
Years	Team	Apps	(Gls)
1987–1991	Queen's Park	120	(40)
1991–1992	Stirling Albion	8	(3)
1991–1994	Alloa Athletic	63	(18)
1994–1995	Dumbarton	4	(0)
- * Club domestic league appearances and goals

Michael Hendry (born 20 December 1965) was a Scottish footballer who played for Queen's Park, Stirling Albion, Alloa Athletic and Dumbarton.
