= Tommy Wilson (footballer, born 1961) =

Scottish footballer and coach

Personal information
- Date of birth: 24 August 1961 (age 65)
- Place of birth: Paisley, Scotland
- Position: Right back

Team information
- Current team: Charlotte FC (Technical Director)

Senior career*
| Years | Team | Apps | (Gls) |
| 1978–1982 | Queen's Park | 32 | (0) |
| 1982–1989 | St Mirren | 287 | (1) |
| 1989–1992 | Dunfermline Athletic | 59 | (0) |
| 1992 | Heart of Midlothian | 1 | (0) |
| 1992–1993 | Kilmarnock | 19 | (0) |
| 1993–1994 | Dumbarton | 19 | (0) |
- * Club domestic league appearances and goals

Tommy Wilson (born 24 August 1961) is a Scottish former footballer, who is the technical director for Major League Soccer club Charlotte FC . He was formerly the Reserve team coach at Rangers, and a coach with the Scotland national team.

== Early life ==
Wilson was brought up in Carmyle, Scotland, a small town in the east end of Glasgow. He was born into a football family, with his father, as well as both brothers playing at a professional level. Prior to embarking on his professional football career, Wilson qualified as a Mechanical and Production engineer.

== Playing career ==
Wilson started his career at Queen's Park, who he joined straight from school in 1978. He was spotted by St Mirren for whom he signed a professional contract in 1982. He made his competitive debut in a League Cup victory over Ayr United on 14 August 1982. Wilson was an ever-present during his first season and his consistent displays earned him a Scotland U-21 cap against Switzerland. Unfortunately, at the start of the following season in August 1983 he suffered a serious knee injury in a match against Rangers which put him out of the game for the rest of that season.

He made a successful come-back in the following season but took time to regain his consistency; eventually over the next two seasons he began to fulfil his early promise. In 1987, he was a member of the team which won the Scottish Cup in a 1–0 victory over Dundee United.

He represented St Mirren in 287 competitive matches, before leaving to join Dunfermline Athletic in October 1989. After three seasons with Dunfermline, he joined Hearts in August 1992, but only made one appearance (as a substitute in a 4–2 victory against Sparta Prague in a UEFA cup match on 30 September 1992). He was given a free transfer to Kilmarnock in November 1992, before moving on to Dumbarton in the summer of 1993.

== Coaching career ==
In June 1994 he was appointed Football development officer to the Scottish Football Association working in the City of Glasgow. By 1998 he had been promoted to Senior Football Development Officer and in 2000 was promoted again to Head of Youth Development. In 2004 Senior National Team Coach, Berti Vogts offered Wilson a dual role as Head of Coaching Education and Scotland under-19 National team coach, working alongside Archie Gemmill. In 2006, Wilson and Gemmill steered Scotland to the final of the European championship where they lost to Spain 2-1 in the Final. At the same time, he joined Rangers as Technical Director for Player Development at the club's Academy and combined this with coaching the Scotland under-20 National team at the world cup in Canada. He succeeded Ian Durrant as reserve team coach in June 2008.

On 14 March 2013, Wilson was named director of Major League Soccer's Philadelphia Union Academy. In 2021 Wilson was promoted to the Union's Director of Academy and Professional Development.

On 24 January 2024, Wilson joined Charlotte FC as the team's technical director.

== Personal life ==
Wilson has a wife Marion, one daughter, Chloe, and two grandchildren. Wilson is also a member of the Coaching Advisory Council for The SWAG, a philanthropically funded, no cost soccer training program for young athletes ages 4 through 8 from Philadelphia's African-American and immigrant communities.
