= Jim Hamilton (footballer, born 1966) =

Scottish footballer

Personal information
- Full name: James Michael Hamilton
- Date of birth: 9 December 1966 (age 59)
- Place of birth: Duntocher, Scotland
- Positions: Defender; midfielder

Youth career
- Yoker Athletic

Senior career*
Years	Team	Apps	(Gls)
1988–1994	Arbroath	163	(4)
1993–1995	Stirling Albion	25	(0)
1994–1996	Dumbarton	12	(0)
1995–1999	Forfar Athletic	92	(0)
1998–2000	Albion Rovers	36	(0)
- * Club domestic league appearances and goals

James Michael Hamilton (born 9 December 1966) was a Scottish footballer who played for Arbroath, Stirling Albion, Dumbarton, Forfar Athletic and Albion Rovers.
