= 1995–96 Scottish First Division =

Scottish First Division
- Season: 1995–96
- Champions: Dunfermline Athletic
- Promoted: Dunfermline Athletic, Dundee United
- Relegated: Dumbarton
- Goals scored: 507
- Average goals/game: 2.82
- Top goalscorer: George O'Boyle (21)
- Biggest home win: Dundee United 8–0 Dumbarton, 02.12.1995
- Biggest away win: Dumbarton 1–5 Dundee, 23.09.1995

The 1995–96 Scottish First Division season began on 12 August 1995.

== Overview ==
The 1995–96 Scottish First Division season ended in success for Dunfermline Athletic who won the title by four points from nearest rivals Dundee United.

== Promotion and relegation from 1994–95 ==
Promoted from First Division to Premier Division

- Raith Rovers

Relegated from Premier Division to First Division

- Dundee United

Promoted from Second Division to First Division

- Greenock Morton
- Dumbarton

Relegated from First Division to Second Division

- Ayr United
- Stranraer

== League table ==
Pos	Team	Pld	W	D	L	GF	GA	GD	Pts	Promotion or relegation
1	Dunfermline Athletic (C, P)	36	21	8	7	73	41	+32	71	Promotion to the Premier Division
2	Dundee United (P)	36	19	10	7	73	37	+36	67	Qualification for the Play-off
3	Greenock Morton	36	20	7	9	57	39	+18	67	
4	St Johnstone	36	19	8	9	60	36	+24	65	
5	Dundee	36	15	12	9	53	40	+13	57	
6	St Mirren	36	13	8	15	46	51	−5	47	
7	Clydebank	36	10	10	16	39	58	−19	40	
8	Airdrieonians	36	9	11	16	43	54	−11	38	
9	Hamilton Academical (R)	36	10	6	20	40	57	−17	36	Relegation to the Second Division
10	Dumbarton (R)	36	3	2	31	23	94	−71	11	Relegation to the Second Division

Source: RSSSF
Rules for classification: 1) points; 2) goal difference; 3) number of goals scored.
(C) Champions; (P) Promoted; (R) Relegated

== See also ==
- 1995–96 in Scottish football
