= 1994–95 Scottish Second Division =

Football division in Scotland

Scottish Second Division
- Season: 1994–95
- Champions: Greenock Morton
- Promoted: Greenock Morton; Dumbarton
- Relegated: Meadowbank Thistle; Brechin City

The 1994–95 Scottish Second Division was won by Greenock Morton who, along with second placed Dumbarton, were promoted to the First Division. Meadowbank Thistle and Brechin City were relegated to the Third Division.

== Table ==
Pos	Team	Pld	W	D	L	GF	GA	GD	Pts	Promotion or relegation
1	Greenock Morton (C, P)	36	18	10	8	55	33	+22	64	Promotion to the First Division
2	Dumbarton (P)	36	17	9	10	57	35	+22	60	Promotion to the First Division
3	Stirling Albion	36	17	7	12	54	43	+11	58	
4	Stenhousemuir	36	14	14	8	46	39	+7	56	
5	Berwick Rangers	36	15	10	11	52	46	+6	55	
6	Clyde	36	14	10	12	53	48	+5	52	
7	Queen of the South	36	11	11	14	46	51	−5	44	
8	East Fife	36	11	10	15	48	56	−8	43	
9	Meadowbank Thistle (R)	36	11	5	20	32	54	−22	35 (Note: 3 points deducted)	Relegation to the Third Division
10	Brechin City (R)	36	6	6	24	22	60	−38	24	Relegation to the Third Division

Rules for classification: 1) points; 2) goal difference; 3) number of goals scored.
(C) Champions; (P) Promoted; (R) Relegated
