= Bobby McConville =

Scottish footballer

Personal information
- Date of birth: 22 August 1964 (age 62)
- Place of birth: Bellshill, Scotland
- Position: Midfielder

Youth career
- Glenboig

Senior career*
Years	Team	Apps	(Gls)
1984–1989	Kilmarnock	80	(0)
1987–1988	→ East Stirlingshire (loan)	5	(0)
1988–1992	Stirling Albion	57	(1)
1991–1995	Dumbarton	69	(4)
1994–1995	East Stirlingshire	5	(0)
1995–1996	Albion Rovers	1	(0)
- * Club domestic league appearances and goals

Robert McConville (born 22 August 1964) was a Scottish footballer who played for Kilmarnock, East Stirlingshire, Stirling Albion, Dumbarton and Albion Rovers.
