= 1996–97 Scottish Second Division =

Scottish Second Division
- Season: 1996–97
- Champions: Ayr United
- Promoted: Ayr United; Hamilton Academical
- Relegated: Dumbarton; Berwick Rangers

The 1996–97 Scottish Second Division was won by Ayr United who, along with second placed Hamilton Academical, were promoted to the First Division. Stenhousemuir and Berwick Rangers were relegated to the Third Division.

== Table ==
Pos	Team	Pld	W	D	L	GF	GA	GD	Pts	Promotion or relegation
1	Ayr United (C, P)	36	23	8	5	61	33	+28	77	Promotion to the First Division
2	Hamilton Academical (P)	36	22	8	6	75	28	+47	74	Promotion to the First Division
3	Livingston	36	18	10	8	56	38	+18	64	
4	Clyde	36	14	10	12	42	39	+3	52	
5	Queen of the South	36	13	8	15	55	57	−2	47	
6	Stenhousemuir	36	11	11	14	49	43	+6	44	
7	Brechin City	36	10	11	15	36	49	−13	41	
8	Stranraer	36	9	9	18	29	51	−22	36	
9	Dumbarton (R)	36	9	8	19	44	66	−22	35	Relegation to the Third Division
10	Berwick Rangers (R)	36	4	11	21	32	75	−43	23	Relegation to the Third Division

Source: "1996-1997 Second Division - SPFL Archive". SPFL.
Rules for classification: 1) points; 2) goal difference; 3) number of goals scored.
(C) Champions; (P) Promoted; (R) Relegated

== Top scorers ==
P	Name	Goals
1	(Scotland) Iain Stewart (Inverness CT)	16
2	(Scotland) G Harvey (Livingston)	15
=	(Scotland) Ian Little (Stenhousemuir)	15
4	(Scotland) Martin McLauchan (Forfar Athletic)	14
5	(Scotland) Colin McDonald (Clydebank)	13
=	(Scotland) B Thomson (Inverness CT)	13
7	(Australia) Ben Honeyman (Forfar Athletic)	12
8	(Scotland) Tommy Bryce (Queen of the South)	11
=	(Scotland) Matthew Dyer (East Fife)	11
=	(Scotland) Gordon Young (Stranraer)	11
