= Calum Campbell =

High Schooler

Calum Campbell OBE
Personal information
- Full name: Calum Campbell OBE
- Date of birth: 7 November 1965 (age 60)
- Place of birth: Erskine
- Height: 6 ft 0 in (1.83 m)
- Positions: Center forward; midfielder

Youth career
- IYHA: Erskine Boys Club. Numerous Ayrshire Junior Clubs

Senior career*
Years	Team	Apps	(Gls)
1987–1989	Airdrie	78	(29)
1989–1991	Partick Thistle	60	(22)
1990–1994	Kilmarnock	70	(18)
1993–1996	Dumbarton	27	(1)
- * Club domestic league appearances and goals

Calum Campbell (born 7 November 1965) was a Scottish footballer who played for Airdrie, Partick Thistle, Kilmarnock and Dumbarton.
