= Jamie Bruce (footballer) =

Scottish footballer

Personal information
- Full name: Jamie Ross Bruce
- Date of birth: 29 August 1976 (age 50)
- Place of birth: East Kilbride, Scotland
- Position: Defender

Youth career
- Captained Scottish Schoolboys Under 18s on several occasions.: East Kilbride Thistle

Senior career*
Years	Team	Apps	(Gls)
1996–2002	Dumbarton	108	(3)
- * Club domestic league appearances and goals

Jamie Ross Bruce (born 29 August 1976) is a Scottish former footballer. Bruce began his career with Hamilton Academical as a schoolboy. In 1996 he signed for Dumbarton, where he made his first team debut as a 20-year-old. He was to play for six seasons and had over 100 first-team appearances before retiring from senior football the age of 25, due to continual injury. He returned to play at the junior level for a few seasons with Johnstone Burgh and Larkhall Thistle.
