= John Boyd (footballer, born 1969) =

Scottish association football player

Personal information
- Full name: John Robertson Boyd
- Date of birth: 1 January 1969 (age 57)
- Place of birth: Greenock, Scotland
- Position: Full back

Youth career
- Greenock

Senior career*
Years	Team	Apps	(Gls)
1989–1995	Dumbarton	146	(14)
1994–1996	St Mirren	26	(3)
- * Club domestic league appearances and goals

John Robertson Boyd (born 1 January 1969) is a Scottish retired footballer who played for Dumbarton and St Mirren.
