= Gerry Farrell =

Scottish footballer (born 1975)

Personal information
- Full name: Gerard James Farrell
- Date of birth: 14 June 1975 (age 51)
- Place of birth: Glasgow, Scotland
- Position: Midfielder

Youth career
- Possil YMCA

Senior career*
Years	Team	Apps	(Gls)
1993–1995	Dumbarton	2	(0)
1995–1997	Dunfermline Athletic	6	(0)
1996–1998	Ross County	50	(2)
1998–2000	Airdrie	39	(1)
1999–2001	Alloa Athletic	5	(1)
2000–2001	Clydebank	22	(0)
2000–2001	Forfar Athletic	2	(0)
2001–2002	Berwick Rangers	22	(0)
- * Club domestic league appearances and goals

Gerard James Farrell (born 14 June 1975) was a Scottish footballer who played for Dumbarton, Dunfermline Athletic, Ross County, Airdrie, Alloa Athletic, Clydebank, Forfar Athletic and Berwick Rangers.
