= Roland Fabiani =

Scottish footballer

Personal information
- Date of birth: 24 November 1971 (age 54)
- Place of birth: Greenock, Scotland
- Position: Left back

Youth career
- Shamrock Boys Club
- Hibernian

Senior career*
Years	Team	Apps	(Gls)
1990–1992	Falkirk	0	(0)
1990–1991	→ Musselburgh Athletic (loan)		
1992–1993	St Mirren	6	(0)
1993–1996	Dumbarton	87	(1)
1996–1999	Greenock Juniors		
1999–2003	Pollok		
2003–2006	Kilwinning Rangers		
2006–2007	Bellshill Athletic		
2007–2008	Arthurlie		
2008–2009	Maryhill		
2009–2010	Greenock Juniors		
- Lanark United
2012–2013	Kilwinning Rangers		
2014–2015	Benburb		
- * Club domestic league appearances and goals

Roland Fabiani (born 24 November 1971) is a Scottish former footballer who played professionally for St Mirren and Dumbarton. He is currently the Assistant Manager of Kilwinning Rangers FC Under 20s Development Team.

== Career ==
Raised in Port Glasgow, Fabiani played in the youth system of Hibernian but did not make a senior appearance for them, nor did he break through to the first team at his next club Falkirk. In 1992 he moved to second-tier St Mirren, making a handful of league appearances in his sole season there. In 1993 he moved on to Dumbarton in the same division, experiencing a relegation, a promotion and another relegation in each of his three campaigns with the Sons, also playing in the Scottish Cup against Rangers at Ibrox.

In 1996 Fabiani left professional football to become a police officer. He continued to play in the Junior grade for many years with spells at several clubs, including three stints for local Greenock Juniors and back-to-back West Region Super League championship wins (2002–03 with Pollok, 2003–04 with Kilwinning Rangers); playing more often at sweeper as he got older, he continued to compete well into his 40s due to maintaining a high level of fitness and having good fortune with injuries. He named former Kilwinning teammate Tam Currie as the best he played with at Junior level.

Fabiani also became involved in the management of both the Scottish and the British police football selections.

In January 2024, he was appointed as Assistant Manager of Kilwinning Rangers Fc Under 20s Development Team.
