= Lee Sharp =

Scottish footballer (born 1975)

- Sharp in 2026

Personal information
- Date of birth: 22 May 1975 (age 51)
- Place of birth: Glasgow, Scotland
- Height: 5 ft 8 in (1.73 m)
- Positions: Defender; midfielder

Team information
- Current team: Dundee United (assistant manager)

Senior career*
Years	Team	Apps	(Gls)
1995–1999	Dumbarton	101	(15)
1999–2000	Dundee	20	(2)
2000–2001	St Mirren	6	(0)
2001–2002	Ayr United	38	(3)
2002–2011	Stranraer	204	(11)
2011–2013	Clyde	45	(1)
- * Club domestic league appearances and goals

Lee Sharp (born 22 May 1975) is a Scottish professional football coach and former player, who is currently assistant manager at Dundee United.

== Career ==
Sharp signed for Clyde in July 2011. He also coached the Clyde under-19 side.

== Coaching career ==
Following his retirement from playing, Sharp worked as a coach and then head of youth development at Clyde from 2013 to 2016. From 2016 to 2019 he was 1st team coach at Alloa Athletic, where he began his coaching partnership with Jim Goodwin. Sharp was Goodwin's assistant manager at St Mirren from 2019 to 2022. Sharp followed Goodwin to Aberdeen in February 2022 and Dundee United in March 2023.
