= Kenny Meechan =

Scottish footballer

Personal information
- Full name: Kenneth Meechan
- Date of birth: 16 February 1972 (age 54)
- Place of birth: Greenock, Scotland
- Position: Goalkeeper

Team information
- Current team: Greenock Morton (U17s coach)

Senior career*
Years	Team	Apps	(Gls)
1993–2000	Dumbarton	103	(0)
2003–2005	Stranraer	3	(0)
- * Club domestic league appearances and goals

Kenneth Meechan (born 16 February 1972) is a Scottish footballer who played for Dumbarton and Stranraer.

He is currently one of three U17s coaches at his hometown club Greenock Morton.
