= Jim Marsland =

Scottish footballer

Personal information
- Full name: James Marsland
- Date of birth: 28 August 1968 (age 58)
- Place of birth: Dumbarton, Scotland
- Position: Defender

Youth career
- Kilpatrick Juveniles

Senior career*
Years	Team	Apps	(Gls)
1990–1998	Dumbarton	208	(2)
- * Club domestic league appearances and goals

James Marsland (born 28 August 1968) is a Scottish former footballer. He began his career with Kilpatrick Juveniles before signing 'senior' with Dumbarton. Here he would spend eight seasons.
