= Toby King (footballer, born 1970) =

Scottish footballer

Personal information
- Full name: Thomas David King
- Date of birth: 23 January 1970 (age 56)
- Place of birth: Dumbarton, Scotland
- Position: Midfielder

Youth career
- Kilpatrick Juveniles

Senior career*
Years	Team	Apps	(Gls)
1991–1993	Clydebank	20	(1)
1993–1995	Arbroath	26	(1)
1994–1997	Dumbarton	81	(4)
1997–1998	Clyde	31	(4)
1998–2001	Dumbarton	70	(10)
2000–2002	Cowdenbeath	29	(6)
- * Club domestic league appearances and goals

Thomas David 'Toby' King (born 23 January 1970) was a Scottish footballer who played for Clydebank, Arbroath, Dumbarton, Clyde and Cowdenbeath.
