= Colin McKinnon =

Scottish footballer

Personal information
- Full name: Colin Graham McKinnon
- Date of birth: 29 August 1969 (age 57)
- Place of birth: Glasgow, Scotland
- Position: Midfielder

Youth career
- Belhaven Athletic

Senior career*
| Years | Team | Apps | (Gls) |
| 1989–1991 | Falkirk | 15 | (1) |
| 1990–1994 | East Stirlingshire | 85 | (14) |
| 1993–1995 | Arbroath | 32 | (7) |
| 1994–1999 | Dumbarton | 156 | (22) |
| 1998–2001 | Stenhousemuir | 64 | (14) |
| 2000–2002 | Arbroath | 40 | (8) |
| 2002–2003 | Albion Rovers | 2 | (0) |
| 2002–2004 | Stirling Albion | 50 | (14) |
- * Club domestic league appearances and goals

Colin Graham McKinnon (born 29 August 1969) was a Scottish footballer who played for Falkirk, East Stirlingshire, Arbroath, Dumbarton, Stenhousemuir, Albion Rovers and Stirling Albion.
