= Hugh Ward (footballer) =

Scottish footballer

Personal information
- Date of birth: 9 March 1970 (age 56)
- Place of birth: Dumbarton, Scotland
- Position: Forward

Youth career
- Greenock

Senior career*
Years	Team	Apps	(Gls)
1993–1998	Dumbarton	112	(27)
1997–1998	Clydebank	2	(0)
1998–1999	East Stirling	31	(5)
1999–2000	Dumbarton	13	(1)
- * Club domestic league appearances and goals

Hugh Ward (born 9 March 1970) was a Scottish footballer who played for Dumbarton, Clydebank and East Stirling.
