= Ian MacFarlane (footballer, born 1968) =

Scottish footballer (born 1968)

Personal information
- Full name: John Pettigrew MacFarlane
- Date of birth: 5 December 1968 (age 57)
- Place of birth: Bellshill, Scotland
- Position: Goalkeeper

Youth career
- Bellshill Athletic

Senior career*
Years	Team	Apps	(Gls)
1988–1991	Hamilton Academical	3	(0)
1991–1997	Dumbarton	180	(0)
1996–1998	Clydebank	40	(0)
1998–2003	Hamilton Academical	88	(1)
- * Club domestic league appearances and goals

John Pettigrew "Ian" MacFarlane (born 5 December 1968) is a Scottish former footballer, who played for Hamilton Academical, Dumbarton and Clydebank.
