= Alan Foster (footballer) =

Scottish footballer

Personal information
- Full name: Alan Foster
- Date of birth: 10 March 1971 (age 55)
- Place of birth: Glasgow, Scotland
- Position: Full back

Youth career
- EKYC

Senior career*
Years	Team	Apps	(Gls)
- Kilsyth Rangers
1990–1996	Dumbarton	71	(0)
- Renfrew
- * Club domestic league appearances and goals

Alan Foster (born 10 March 1971) was a Scottish footballer. He began his career with junior side Kilsyth Rangers before signing 'senior' with Dumbarton.
