= Paul Martin (Scottish footballer) =

Scottish footballer and coach

Personal information
- Full name: Paul John Martin
- Date of birth: 8 March 1965 (age 61)
- Place of birth: Bellshill, Scotland
- Position: Centre back

Senior career*
Years	Team	Apps	(Gls)
1984–1988	Kilmarnock	140	(5)
1988–1990	Hamilton Academical	44	(1)
1990	→ Stranraer (loan)	1	(0)
1990–1996	Dumbarton	151	(8)
1996–1998	Albion Rovers	43	(2)
1998–2001	Queen's Park	57	(7)
Total		436	(23)

Managerial career
- 2004–2006: Dumbarton
- 2008–2012: Albion Rovers
- * Club domestic league appearances and goals

Paul Martin (born 8 March 1965) is a Scottish football former player and coach. Martin played for Kilmarnock, Hamilton Academical, Stranraer (on loan), Dumbarton, Albion Rovers and Queen's Park during a 17-year playing career.

Martin was captain of the Dumbarton Second Division title-winning team of 1991–92. After retiring he coached at Queen's Park and had a couple of caretaker stints there as well serving as assistant manager.

Martin then managed Dumbarton, but was sacked after the club were relegated from the Second Division in June 2006.

He was then assistant manager to predecessor John McCormack at Albion Rovers. When McCormack moved to Hamilton Academical to become assistant manager to Billy Reid, Martin was promoted to the position of Albion Rovers manager.

Martin won the manager of the month award for the Third Division for September 2010, and again in April 2011.

Martin resigned as manager of Albion Rovers on 20 May 2012, immediately after defeating Stranraer in the Second Division Play-off final, citing health reasons for his decision.

As of December 2010, Martin was running a business called One Stop Roofing.

== Managerial statistics ==
As of May 2012

Team	Nat	From	To	Record				
Team	Nat	From	To	G	W	D	L	Win %
Dumbarton	(Scotland)	December 2004	June 2006	62	12	15	35	19.35
Albion Rovers	(Scotland)	July 2008	May 2012	192	64	47	81	33.33
