= Martin McGarvey =

Scottish footballer

Personal information
- Date of birth: 16 January 1972 (age 54)
- Position: Midfielder

Youth career
- Irvine Meadow

Senior career*
Years	Team	Apps	(Gls)
1990–1997	Dumbarton	117	(11)
- * Club domestic league appearances and goals

Martin McGarvey (born 16 January 1972) was a Scottish footballer. He began his career with junior side Irvine Meadow before signing 'senior' with Dumbarton. Here he would spend seven seasons before moving back to play in the 'junior' ranks with Arthurlie, where he would be part of a Scottish Junior Cup winning side.
