= Martin Mooney =

Scottish footballer (born 1970)

Personal information
- Date of birth: 25 September 1970 (age 56)
- Place of birth: Alexandria, West Dunbartonshire, Scotland
- Height: 1.70 m (5 ft 7 in)
- Position: Forward

Team information
- Current team: Broomhill (first team coach)

Youth career
- 1988–1991: Falkirk

Senior career*
Years	Team	Apps	(Gls)
1988–1992	Falkirk	29	(2)
1989–1990	→ Stirling Albion (loan)	2	(0)
1992–1999	Dumbarton	248	(55)
1999–2002	Stenhousemuir	60	(17)

Managerial career
- 2008: Berwick Rangers (assistant manager)
- Camelon Juniors (assistant manager)
- Kilsyth Rangers (assistant manager)
- 2016–2018: East Stirlingshire F.C.(assistant head coach)
- * Club domestic league appearances and goals as of 10:50, 25 May 2016 (UTC)

Martin Mooney (born 25 September 1970) is a Scottish former footballer who is currently a first team coach at Lowland League side Broomhill.

== Career ==
During his career, Mooney played for Falkirk, Stirling Albion (on loan), Dumbarton and Stenhousemuir. He was assistant manager at Berwick Rangers to Allan McGonigal before both departed the club in November 2008. Mooney was also assistant manager to Stevie Kerrigan at Camelon Juniors. In 2011, Martin became assistant manager at Kilsyth Rangers, winning the Central District First Division. In May 2016, Mooney was appointed assistant manager to John Sludden at East Stirlingshire, following their relegation to the Lowland League. He was named Manager of Sauchie FC June 2019 but had to leave due to family reasons September 2019. He is now a coach at Camelon Juniors.
