= Martin Melvin (footballer) =

Scottish footballer

Personal information
- Date of birth: 7 August 1969 (age 57)
- Place of birth: Glasgow, Scotland
- Positions: Full back; sweeper; midfielder

Senior career*
Years	Team	Apps	(Gls)
1989–1991	Falkirk	26	(0)
1990–1998	Dumbarton	212	(5)
1997–1999	Albion Rovers	59	(6)
- * Club domestic league appearances and goals

Martin Melvin (born 7 August 1969) was a Scottish footballer who played for Stockport County FC, Motherwell FC, Falkirk, Dumbarton and Albion Rovers.
