= Jim Meechan =

Scottish footballer

Personal information
- Full name: James Meechan
- Date of birth: 14 October 1963 (age 63)
- Place of birth: Alexandria, Scotland
- Position: Midfielder

Youth career
- Irvine Meadow

Senior career*
Years	Team	Apps	(Gls)
1989–1998	Dumbarton	270	(32)
- * Club domestic league appearances and goals

James Meechan (born 14 October 1963) was a Scottish footballer. He began his career in the junior ranks with Ayrshire side Irvine Meadow, before turning 'senior' and joining Dumbarton where he was a stalwart in the midfield for seven seasons.
