= Stevie Gow =

Scottish footballer

Personal information
- Full name: Stephen Gow
- Date of birth: 6 December 1968 (age 57)
- Place of birth: Dumbarton, Scotland
- Position: Full back

Youth career
- Dumbarton United

Senior career*
Years	Team	Apps	(Gls)
1987–1999	Dumbarton	257	(4)
- * Club domestic league appearances and goals

Stephen 'Stevie' Gow (born in Dumbarton on 6 December 1968) is a Scottish former footballer. He began his career with local amateur side Dumbarton United before signing senior with Dumbarton. There he spent the whole of this senior playing career, being an automatic selection in the Dumbarton defence for over a decade.
