= List of East Stirlingshire F.C. seasons =

This is a list of East Stirlingshire Football Club seasons from 1882–83 to the present day. The list details East Stirlingshire's record in major league and cup competitions, and the club's top league goal scorer of each season where available. Top scorers in bold were also the top scorers in East Stirlingshire's division that season. Records of minor competitions such as the Stirlingshire Cup are not included.

The club was founded in 1880 as Bainsford Britannia, a year later changing to its present name of East Stirlingshire. The club first competed in the Scottish Cup in 1882, two years after the club was established. The club was then admitted to the Scottish Football League in 1900.

== Seasons ==
Season	League									Scottish Cup	League Cup	Challenge Cup	Top league goal scorer	
Season	Division	P	W	D	L	F	A	Pts	Pos	Scottish Cup	League Cup	Challenge Cup	Name	Goals
1882–83										R1				
1883–84										R3				
1884–85										R2				
1885–86										R3				
1886–87										R3				
1887–88										R3				
1888–89										QF				
1889–90										R4				
1890–91										QF				
1891–92										R1				
1893–94										R1				
1894–95										R1				
1895–96										R1				
1897–98										R2				
1898–99										R2				
1899–1900										R1				
1900–01	Div 2	18	7	3	8	34	39	17	7th	R1				
1901–02	Div 2	22	8	3	11	36	46	19	9th					
1902–03	Div 2	22	9	3	10	46	41	21	8th					
1903–04	Div 2	22	8	5	9	35	40	21	5th					
1904–05	Div 2	22	7	5	10	37	38	19	9th					
1905–06	Div 2	22	1	10	11	26	47	12	12th					
1906–07	Div 2	22	6	4	12	36	48	16	11th (Note: East Stirlingshire finished level on points with Raith Rovers and would have finished 10th but lost 3–2 in a play-off to determine the ranking order, so subsequently finished below the club.)					
1907–08	Div 2	22	9	5	8	30	32	23	4th					
1908–09	Div 2	22	9	3	10	27	33	21	7th	R1				
1909–10	Div 2	22	9	2	11	38	43	20	8th					
1910–11	Div 2	22	7	6	9	28	34	20	7th	R1				
1911–12	Div 2	22	7	3	12	21	31	17	9th	R2				
1912–13	Div 2	26	12	8	6	43	27	32	3rd	R2				
1913–14	Div 2	22	7	8	7	40	36	22	7th	R2				
1914–15	Div 2	26	13	5	8	53	44	31	4th					
Division 2 and the Scottish Cup were postponed due to World War I
1919–20										R2				
1920–21										R3				
1921–22	Div 2	38	12	10	16	43	60	34	15th	R3				
1922–23	Div 2	38	10	8	20	48	69	28	19th	R1				
1923–24	Div 3	30	17	8	5	63	36	42	2nd	R3				
1924–25	Div 2	38	11	8	19	58	72	30	18th	R2				
1925–26	Div 2	38	10	7	21	59	89	27	18th	R1				
1926–27	Div 2	38	18	8	12	93	75	44	5th	R1				
1927–28	Div 2	38	14	10	14	84	76	38	9th	R1				
1928–29	Div 2	36	14	4	18	71	75	32	12th	R2				
1929–30	Div 2	38	16	4	18	83	75	36	12th	R1				
1930–31	Div 2	38	17	7	14	85	74	41	7th	R1				
1931–32	Div 2	38	26	3	9	111	55	55	1st	R1				
1932–33	Div 1	38	7	3	28	55	115	17	20th	R1				
1933–34	Div 2	34	14	7	13	65	74	35	9th	R3				
1934–35	Div 2	34	11	7	16	57	76	29	14th	R1				
1935–36	Div 2	34	13	8	13	70	75	34	8th	R1				
1936–37	Div 2	34	18	2	14	81	78	38	7th	R1				
1937–38	Div 2	34	9	7	18	55	95	25	13th	R1				
1938–39	Div 2	34	9	4	21	89	130	22	17th	R1				
Division 2 and the Scottish Cup were postponed due to World War II
1946–47	Div C (Note: After World War II ended, East Stirlingshire were not re-elected to join Division Two. The club therefore joined the newly created, and short-lived, Division "C" along with reserve teams.)	18	10	2	6	54	40	22	4th	R2				
1947–48	Div C	22	18	3	1	72	26	39	1st	R2				
1948–49	Div 2	30	6	6	18	38	67	18	16th (Note: After being promoted back to Division Two in 1948–49 and finishing bottom, the club was not re-elected to compete next season. The club played in minor leagues until 1955–56 when the club re-joined Division Two.)	R2	PR			
1950–51										R2				
1951–52										R1				
1952–53										R2				
1953–54										R1				
1954–55										R3				
1955–56	Div 2	36	9	10	17	66	94	28	16th	R4	PR			
1956–57	Div 2	36	5	7	24	56	121	17	19th	R4	PR			
1957–58	Div 2	36	12	5	19	55	79	29	15th	R1	PR			
1958–59	Div 2	36	10	8	18	50	79	28	15th	R1	PR			
1959–60	Div 2	36	10	8	18	68	82	28	15th	R3	PR			
1960–61	Div 2	36	9	7	20	59	100	25	16th	R1	PR			
1961–62	Div 2	36	15	4	17	70	81	34	11th	R1	PR			
1962–63	Div 2	36	20	9	7	80	50	49	2nd	R3	PR			
1963–64	Div 1	34	5	2	27	37	91	12	18th	R3	PR			
1964–65	Div 2 (Note: East Stirlingshire competed under the name "East Stirlingshire Clydebank", or "E.S. Clydebank" for short, after merging with Clydebank Juniors. The merge lasted for only one season.)	36	13	10	11	64	50	40	5th	R1	PR			
1965–66	Div 2	38	9	5	22	59	91	23	17th	R1	PR			
1966–67	Div 2	38	7	10	21	44	87	24	19th	R1	PR			
1967–68	Div 2	36	9	10	17	61	74	28	15th	R1	PR			
1968–69	Div 2	36	17	5	14	70	62	39	9th	R2	PR			
1969–70	Div 2	36	14	5	17	58	75	33	12th	PR1	PR			
1970–71	Div 2	36	9	9	18	57	86	27	17th	R1	PR			
1971–72	Div 2	36	17	7	12	60	58	41	8th	R1	PR			
1972–73	Div 2	36	12	8	16	52	69	32	13th	R2	PR			
1973–74	Div 2	36	9	5	22	47	73	23	16th	R1	SR			
1974–75	Div 2 (Note: Due to league restructuring the teams ranked 7th to 20th of the 1974–75 Second Division were moved to a new "Division Two" to make room for a new Premier Division above Division One for the 1975–76 season. The new Second Division became the third tier of Scottish football behind the new First Division and Premier Division.)	38	16	8	14	56	52	40	10th	R3	PR			
1975–76	SFL 2	26	8	8	10	33	33	24	8th	R1	PR			
1976–77	SFL 2	39	12	8	19	47	63	32	10th	R3	PR			
1977–78	SFL 2	39	15	8	16	55	65	38	9th	R2	R2			
1978–79	SFL 2	39	12	8	19	61	87	32	12th	R2	R2			
1979–80	SFL 2	39	21	7	11	55	40	49	2nd	R1	R1			
1980–81	SFL 1	39	6	17	16	41	57	29	11th	QF	R1			
1981–82	SFL 1	39	7	10	22	38	77	24	13th	R1	PR			
1982–83	SFL 2	39	7	9	23	41	79	23	13th	R1	PR			
1983–84	SFL 2	39	10	11	18	51	66	31	11th	R3	R1			
1984–85	SFL 2	39	8	15	16	38	53	31	12th	R2	R2			
1985–86	SFL 2	39	11	6	22	49	69	28	11th	R1	R1			
1986–87	SFL 2	39	6	11	22	33	56	23	13th	R1	R2			
1987–88	SFL 2	39	15	13	11	51	47	43	6th	R4	R2			
1988–89	SFL 2	39	13	11	15	54	58	37	9th	R2	R1			
1989–90	SFL 2	39	8	10	21	34	66	26	14th	R3	R1			
1990–91	SFL 2	39	9	11	19	36	72	29	13th	R1	R2	R2		
1991–92	SFL 2	39	15	11	13	61	70	41	6th	R1	R2	R1		
1992–93	SFL 2	39	8	9	22	50	85	25	13th	R4	R1	R1		
1993–94	SFL 2 (Note: Due to league restructuring the teams ranked 7th to 14th of the 1993–94 Second Division were moved from the Second Division to create a new Third Division for the 1994–95 season. Points restructuring also saw three points awarded for a win and one for a draw in the seasons following. This was changed from two for a win and one for a draw.)	39	13	11	15	54	57	37	9th	R3	R3	R1		
1994–95	SFL 3	36	18	5	13	61	50	59	4th	R1	R1	R1		
1995–96	SFL 3	36	11	11	14	58	62	44	7th	R2	R2	R1		
1996–97	SFL 3	36	8	9	19	36	58	33	9th	R3	R1	R2		
1997–98	SFL 3	36	17	6	13	50	48	57	4th	R2	R2	R1	Davie Watt	12
1998–99	SFL 3	36	9	13	14	50	48	40	8th	R3	R1	— (Note: The 1998–99 Scottish Challenge Cup tournament was suspended due to lack of sponsorship.)	Hugh Ward	7
1999–2000	SFL 3	36	11	7	18	28	50	40	7th	R2	R2	R1	Gary Higgins; Stevie Laidlaw	9
2000–01	SFL 3	36	10	7	19	37	69	37	8th	R1	R2	SF	Steve Hislop	15
2001–02	SFL 3	36	12	4	20	51	58	40	7th	R2	R1	R1		
2002–03	SFL 3	36	2	7	27	32	105	13	10th	R1	R1	R1	Jordan Leishman	5
2003–04	SFL 3	36	2	2	32	30	118	8	10th	R2	R1	R1		
2004–05	SFL 3	36	5	7	24	32	88	22	10th	R1	R1	R1	Derek Ure	6
2005–06	SFL 3	36	6	5	25	28	89	23	10th	R1	R1	R1	Iain Diack	9
2006–07	SFL 3	36	6	3	27	27	78	21	10th	R1	R1	R1	Marc McKenzie	5
2007–08	SFL 3	36	10	4	22	48	71	34	9th	R4	R1	QF	Andrew Brand	11
2008–09	SFL 3	36	19	4	13	57	50	61	3rd	R4	R1	R2	**Brian Graham**	**15**
2009–10	SFL 3	36	19	4	13	50	46	61	3rd	R2	R1	R2	Simon Lynch	13
2010–11	SFL 3	36	10	4	22	33	62	34	9th	R4	R1	R2	Kevin Cawley	8
2011–12	SFL 3	36	6	6	24	38	88	24	10th	R3	R1	R1	Kevin Turner	6
2012–13	SFL 3	36	8	5	23	49	97	29	10th	R3	R1	QF	Paul Quinn	11
2013–14	SL 2	36	12	8	16	45	59	44	8th	R3	R1	R1	Paul Quinn	7
2014–15	SL 2	36	13	4	19	40	66	43	9th	R3	R1	R1	David McKenna	12
2015–16	SL 2	36	9	5	22	41	79	32	10th	R2	R1	R1	David McKenna	10
2016–17	Lowland	30	21	5	4	107	43	68	2nd	R2	Group	R1		
2017–18	Lowland	30	19	7	4	67	31	64	4th	R2	—	R1		
2018–19	Lowland	28	11	6	11	57	47	39	6th	R2	—	R1		
2019–20	Lowland	26	17	2	7	77	29	46	4th (Note: With the season not being fully completed, a points per game formula was subsequently used to determine the final standing.)	R1	—	—	Jamie Dishington	16
2020–21	Lowland	12	8	2	2	30	12	26	5th	R1	—	—	Andy Rodgers	8
2021–22	Lowland	34	15	11	8	61	36	56	6th	R2	—	—	TBC	TBC
2022–23	Lowland	36	8	9	19	41	74	33	16th	R1	—	R2	Connor Greene; Niyah Joseph	7
2023–24	Lowland	34	12	4	18	58	68	40	14th	R1	—	—	Luke Rankin	23
2024–25	Lowland	34	12	7	15	54	67	43	9th	R1	—	R2	Lucas McRoberts	7
2025–26	Lowland	34	5	3	26	48	94	18	18th	R2	—	—		

== Key ==
Champions	Runners-up	Promoted	Relegated

- P = Played
- W = Wins
- D = Draws
- L = Losses
- F = Goals for
- A = Goals against
- Pts = Points
- Pos = Final position
- PR = Preliminary round
- PR1 = Preliminary round 1
- SR = Supplementary round
- Group = Group stage
- R1 = Round 1
- R2 = Round 2
- R3 = Round 3
- R4 = Round 4
- QF = Quarter-finals
- SF = Semi-finals
- Div 1 = Scottish Division One
- Div 2 = Scottish Division Two
- SFL 1 = Scottish First Division
- SFL 2 = Scottish Second Division
- SFL 3 = Scottish Football League Third Division
- SL 2 = Scottish League Two
- Lowland = Lowland Football League
