= 1999–2000 Dumbarton F.C. season =

Dumbarton
1999–2000 season
- Manager: Jimmy Brown
- Stadium: Boghead Park, Dumbarton
- Scottish League Division 3: 6th
- Scottish Cup: Second Round
- Scottish League Cup: First Round
- Bell's Challenge Cup: First Round
- Top goalscorer: League: Paddy Flannery (14); All: Paddy Flannery (16)
- Highest home attendance: 3,031
- Lowest home attendance: 324
- Average home league attendance: 581

Season 1999–2000 was the 116th football season in which Dumbarton competed at a Scottish national level, entering the Scottish Football League for the 94th time, the Scottish Cup for the 105th time, the Scottish League Cup for the 53rd time and the Scottish Challenge Cup for the ninth time.

== Overview ==
The 1999-2000 season marked the last that the club would play at Boghead Park. The ground, which opened in 1879, was the oldest stadium in Scotland in continuous use, before being sold to accommodate a housing development. The following season the club would move into their new stadium, now known as The Rock.

The season itself was unremarkable. Three promotion places were up for grabs due to the addition of Elgin City and Peterhead the following season, however despite an encouraging start there was never a real chance of a top three finish and in the end a midtable 6th place was achieved. It would be the final game however that would define the whole campaign. As it was a crowd in excess of 3,000 turned out to bid farewell to the old ground and with it a fine victory over promoted East Fife.

In the national cup competitions, there was little to cheer. In the Scottish Cup, Dumbarton lost to Stenhousemuir in the second round.

In the League Cup, after a win over Brechin City, Dundee would easily dispatch Dumbarton in the second round.

With newfound sponsorship, the Scottish Challenge Cup was re-instated, but the same old failures beset Dumbarton - yet another first round defeat, this time to Airdrie.

Locally, in the Stirlingshire Cup, Dumbarton lost their two group ties.

== Results & fixtures ==
Win Draw Loss

=== Scottish Third Division ===
7 August 1999 Third Division	Albion Rovers	1–3	Dumbarton	Cliftonhill Stadium
	Duncan		King; Melvin	Attendance: 308

14 August 1999 Third Division	Dumbarton	3–4	Montrose	Boghead Park
	Flannery; Brown		Farnan; O'Driscoll	Attendance: 436

21 August 1999 Third Division	East Fife	1–0	Dumbarton	Bayview Stadium
	McGrillen			Attendance: 591

28 August 1999 Third Division	Brechin City	0–2	Dumbarton	Glebe Park, Brechin
			King; Flannery	Attendance: 357

4 September 1999 Third Division	Dumbarton	2–1	Berwick Rangers	Boghead Park
	Flannery; Robertson		Ritchie	Attendance: 324

11 September 1999 Third Division	Dumbarton	0–1	Queen's Park	Boghead Park
			Carroll	Attendance: 539

18 September 1999 Third Division	East Stirling	1–3	Dumbarton	Firs Park
	Laidlaw		Templeman	Attendance: 284

25 September 1999 Third Division	Dumbarton	1–1	Cowdenbeath	Boghead Park
	Robertson		(OG)	Attendance: 424

2 October 1999 Third Division	Forfar Athletic	5–0	Dumbarton	Station Park, Forfar
	Milne; Cargill; MacDonald			Attendance: 397

16 October 1999 Third Division	Montrose	1–4	Dumbarton	Links Park
	Mailer		Grace; Flannery; Smith	Attendance: 274

23 October 1999 Third Division	Dumbarton	1–1	Albion Rovers	Boghead Park
	Smith		Tait	Attendance: 590

30 October 1999 Third Division	Queen's Park	3–2	Dumbarton	Hampden Park
	Connaghan; Gallacher; Carroll		Ward; Bradford	Attendance: 713

6 November 1999 Third Division	Dumbarton	1–0	East Stirling	Boghead Park
	Bradford			Attendance: 415

14 November 1999 Third Division	Berwick Rangers	0–1	Dumbarton	Shielfield Park
			Bradford	Attendance: 415

20 November 1999 Third Division	Dumbarton	1–3	Brechin City	Boghead Park
	Flannery		Hutcheson; Black; Honeyman	Attendance: 447

27 November 1999 Third Division	Dumbarton	3–3	Forfar Athletic	Boghead Park
	Flannery; Robertson; Stewart		Donaldson; Milne; Robson	Attendance: 469

8 December 1999 Third Division	Cowdenbeath	0–2	Dumbarton	Central Park, Cowdenbeath
			Brown; Robertson	Attendance: 262

18 December 1999 Third Division	Albion Rovers	3–0	Dumbarton	Cliftonhill Stadium
	McStay; Duncan; McLees			Attendance: 257

3 January 2000 Third Division	East Stirling	2–1	Dumbarton	Firs Park
	Laidlaw		Flannery	Attendance: 308

22 January 2000 Third Division	Dumbarton	2–0	Cowdenbeath	Boghead Park
	Flannery; Brown			Attendance: 469

29 January 2000 Third Division	Dumbarton	1–1	Queen's Park	Boghead Park
	Flannery		Carroll	Attendance: 492

5 February 2000 Third Division	Forfar Athletic	4–3	Dumbarton	Station Park, Forfar
	McCheyne; Milne; Craig		Flannery; Robertson; Smith	Attendance: 439

12 February 2000 Third Division	Brechin City	1–2	Dumbarton	Glebe Park, Brechin
	Black		Flannery; Brown	Attendance: 278

26 February 2000 Third Division	Dumbarton	3–2	Montrose	Boghead Park
	King; Robertson; Hringsson		Shand; Taylor	Attendance: 482

4 March 2000 Third Division	East Fife	2–1	Dumbarton	Bayview Stadium
	Moffat; McManus		Watters	Attendance: 436

11 March 2000 Third Division	Queen's Park	2–0	Dumbarton	Hampden Park
	McGoldrick; Whelan			Attendance: 788

14 March 2000 Third Division	Dumbarton	0–2	Berwick Rangers	Boghead Park
			Leask; Smith	Attendance: 330

18 March 2000 Third Division	Dumbarton	3–0	East Stirling	Boghead Park
	Dillon; Hringsson; Watters			Attendance: 367

25 March 2000 Third Division	Dumbarton	2–1	Brechin City	Boghead Park
	Brittain; Grace		Black	Attendance: 365

28 March 2000 Third Division	Dumbarton	1–1	East Fife	Boghead Park
	Hringsson		McCormick	Attendance: 394

1 April 2000 Third Division	Berwick Rangers	0–0	Dumbarton	Shielfield Park
				Attendance: 560

8 April 2000 Third Division	Cowdenbeath	1–2	Dumbarton	Central Park, Cowdenbeath
	Gray		Flannery	Attendance: 284

15 April 2000 Third Division	Dumbarton	0–0	Forfar Athletic	Boghead Park
				Attendance: 474

22 April 2000 Third Division	Dumbarton	0–0	Albion Rovers	Boghead Park
				Attendance: 415

29 April 2000 Third Division	Montrose	2–1	Dumbarton	Links Park
	Taylor; Ogboke		King	Attendance: 267

6 May 2000 Third Division	Dumbarton	2–1	East Fife	Boghead Park
	King; Robertson		Logan	Attendance: 3,031

=== Bell's Challenge Cup ===
10 August 1999 Challenge Cup round 1	Airdrie	2–1	Dumbarton	Excelsior Stadium
	Moore		Dillon	Attendance: 826; Referee: J Fleming

=== CIS League Cup ===
31 July 1999 League Cup round 1	Brechin City	0–2	Dumbarton	Glebe Park, Brechin
			Flannery	Attendance: 346; Referee: A Gemmill

17 August 1999 League Cup round 2	Dundee	4–0	Dumbarton	Dens Park
	Boyack; Falconer			Attendance: 2,765; Referee: T Brown

=== Tennent's Scottish Cup ===
8 January 2000 Cup round 2	Dumbarton	0–2	Stenhousemuir	Boghead Park
			Fisher; Hamilton, R	Attendance: 302; Referee: D Smith

=== Stirlingshire Cup ===
14 July 1999 Group stage	Stirling Albion	3–0	Dumbarton	Forthbank Stadium
	McQuade 50'; Donald 55', 79'			Referee: I Frickleton

17 July 1999 Group stage	Dumbarton	2–3	Alloa Athletic	Boghead Park
	King 9'; Brown 11'		Clark 22', 34'; McKechnie 46'	Attendance: 118

=== Friendlies ===
27 July 1999 Friendly	Dumbarton	2–6	Kilmarnock	Boghead Park
	King 55'; Gow 76' (pen.)		Roberts 6'; Mitchell 11'; McCutcheon; Vareille; Innes	Referee: K Clark

24 January 2000 Friendly	Dumbarton	1–6	Rangers XI	Boghead Park
	Flannery 39'		De Boer 57', 78', 79'; Mols 16'; Johnston 18'; Ferguson 20'	Attendance: 2,000

== League table ==
Pos	Team	Pld	W	D	L	GF	GA	GD	Pts
4	East Fife	36	17	8	11	45	39	+6	59
5	Cowdenbeath	36	15	9	12	59	43	+16	54
6	Dumbarton	36	15	8	13	53	51	+2	53
7	East Stirlingshire	36	11	7	18	28	50	−22	40
8	Brechin City	36	10	8	18	42	51	−9	38

Source: "1999-2000 Third Division - SPFL Archive". SPFL (in Malay).
Rules for classification: 1) points; 2) goal difference; 3) number of goals scored.

== Player statistics ==
=== Squad ===
No.	Pos	Nat	Player	Total		Third Division		League Cup		Challenge Cup		Scottish Cup	
No.	Pos	Nat	Player	Apps	Goals	Apps	Goals	Apps	Goals	Apps	Goals	Apps	Goals
	GK	(Scotland) SCO	Derek Barnes	26	0	24+0	0	0+0	0	1+0	0	1+0	0
	GK	(Scotland) SCO	Kenny Meechan	14	0	12+0	0	0+0	0	0+0	0	2+0	0
	DF	(Scotland) SCO	Craig Brittain	39	1	35+0	1	2+0	0	1+0	0	1+0	0
	DF	(Scotland) SCO	Jamie Bruce	25	0	21+0	0	2+0	0	1+0	0	1+0	0
	DF	(Scotland) SCO	Michael Dickie	35	0	31+0	0	2+0	0	1+0	0	1+0	0
	DF	(Scotland) SCO	Paul Finnigan	2	0	2+0	0	0+0	0	0+0	0	0+0	0
	DF	(Scotland) SCO	Alex Grace	31	2	26+1	2	2+0	0	1+0	0	1+0	0
	DF	(Scotland) SCO	Stephen Jack	38	0	34+0	0	1+0	0	1+0	0	2+0	0
	DF	(Scotland) SCO	Kevin McCann	3	0	3+0	0	0+0	0	0+0	0	0+0	0
	DF	(Scotland) SCO	John McCormack	18	0	8+10	0	0+0	0	0+0	0	0+0	0
	DF	(Scotland) SCO	Martin Melvin	8	0	1+5	0	0+1	0	0+1	0	0+0	0
	DF	(Scotland) SCO	Dave Stewart	22	1	21+0	1	0+0	0	0+0	0	1+0	0
	MF	(Scotland) SCO	Steven Bonar	3	0	3+0	0	0+0	0	0+0	0	0+0	0
	MF	(Scotland) SCO	Alan Brown	3	0	0+3	0	0+0	0	0+0	0	0+0	0
	MF	(Scotland) SCO	John Dillon	27	2	17+8	1	0+1	1	0+1	0	0+0	0
	MF	(Scotland) SCO	Chris Gentile	2	0	0+2	0	0+0	0	0+0	0	0+0	0
	MF	(Scotland) SCO	Billy Melvin	12	2	8+2	2	2+0	0	0+0	0	0+0	0
	FW	(Scotland) SCO	John Bradford	6	3	6+0	3	0+0	0	0+0	0	0+0	0
	FW	(Scotland) SCO	Andy Brown	38	4	27+7	4	2+0	0	1+0	0	1+0	0
	FW	(Scotland) SCO	Paddy Flannery	33	16	27+2	14	2+0	2	1+0	0	1+0	0
	FW	(Iceland) ISL	Hreinn Hringsson	14	3	3+10	3	0+0	0	0+0	0	0+1	0
	FW	(Scotland) SCO	Toby King	36	5	32+0	5	1+0	0	1+0	0	2+0	0
	FW	(Scotland) SCO	Scott McHarg	10	0	1+6	0	0+2	0	1+0	0	0+0	0
	FW	(Scotland) SCO	Joe Robertson	39	7	33+3	7	2+0	0	0+0	0	1+0	0
	FW	(Scotland) SCO	Chris Smith	21	4	9+11	4	0+0	0	0+1	0	0+0	0
	FW	(Scotland) SCO	Chris Templeman	3	3	3+0	3	0+0	0	0+0	0	0+0	0
	FW	(Scotland) SCO	Hugh Ward	15	1	3+10	1	0+1	0	1+0	0	0+0	0
	FW	(Scotland) SCO	Willie Watters	7	2	6+1	2	0+0	0	0+0	0	0+0	0

=== Transfers ===
==== Players in ====
Player	From	Date
(Scotland) Hugh Ward	(Scotland) East Stirling	26 May 1999
(Scotland) Michael Dickie	(Scotland) Dundee	11 Jun 1999
(Scotland) Scott McHarg	(Scotland) Partick Thistle	23 Jun 1999
(Scotland) Andy Brown	(Scotland) Clydebank	21 Jul 1999
(Scotland) John Dillon	(Scotland) Clyde	30 Jul 1999
(Scotland) John McCormack	(Scotland) Alloa Athletic	30 Jul 1999
(Scotland) Chris Templeman	(Scotland) Dunfermline Athletic (loan)	17 Sep 1999
(Scotland) John Bradford	(Scotland) Ayr United (loan)	23 Oct 1999
(Scotland) Kevin McCann	(Scotland) Partick Thistle (loan)	26 Nov 1999
(Scotland) Dave Stewart	(Scotland) Ayr United	1 Dec 1999
(Iceland) Hrienn Hringsson	(Iceland) KA Akureyri	11 Dec 1999
(Scotland) Chris Gentile	(Scotland) Dundee United	25 Feb 2000
(Scotland) Willie Watters	(Scotland) Stenhousemuir (loan)	25 Feb 2000
(Scotland) Steven Bonar	(Scotland) Albion Rovers	30 Mar 2000

==== Players out ====
Player	To	Date
(Scotland) Willie Wilson	(Scotland) Cowdenbeath	23 Jul 1999
(Scotland) Chris Ewing	(Scotland) Clydebank	30 Jul 1999
(Scotland) Martin Mooney	(Scotland) Stenhousemuir	31 Jul 1999
(Scotland) Colin McKinnon	(Scotland) Stenhousemuir	13 Mar 1999
(Scotland) Peter Dennison	(Scotland) Vale of Leven	
(Scotland) Stevie Gow	(Scotland) Vale of Leven	
(Scotland) Keith Millar	(Scotland) Oban Saints	
(Scotland) David Reid	(Scotland) Cumnock	
(Scotland) Barry Wilkinson	(Scotland) Cumnock	

== Youth Team ==
Dumbarton played an under 19 team in the Scottish Youth Division B, and with 6 wins and 4 draws from 26 games, finished 9th of 10.

== Trivia ==
- The League match against Albion Rovers on 8 August marked Kenny Meechan's 100th appearance for Dumbarton in all national competitions - the 114th Dumbarton player to reach this milestone.

== See also ==
- 1999–2000 in Scottish football
