= 2000–01 Dumbarton F.C. season =

Dumbarton
2000-01 season
- Manager: Jimmy Brown/Tom Carson
- Stadium: Cliftonhill Stadium, Coatbridge/ Strathclyde Homes Stadium, Dumbarton
- Scottish League Division 3: 6th
- Scottish Cup: Second Round
- Scottish League Cup: Second Round
- Bell's Challenge Cup: Second Round
- Top goalscorer: League: Paddy Flannery (17); All: Paddy Flannery (21)
- Highest home attendance: 1,876
- Lowest home attendance: 238
- Average home league attendance: 624

Season 2000–01 was the 117th football season in which Dumbarton competed at a Scottish national level, entering the Scottish Football League for the 95th time, the Scottish Cup for the 106th time, the Scottish League Cup for the 54th time and the Scottish Challenge Cup for the 10th time.

== Overview ==
At the start of season 2000-01 Dumbarton would be without a home until their new stadium was ready - and would play their 'home' games 40 miles away at Coatbridge, the home of Albion Rovers. The spell at Cliftonhill was not successful as only one 'home' game there was won - and by that time any chance of promotion had been lost. At the beginning of November manager Jimmy Brown left the club to be replaced by his assistant Tom Carson.

The big day of the opening of the new home ground was 2 December. A game between two of the bottom clubs in Division 3 would not normally have attracted a large turnout but as it was, an almost capacity crowd watched Dumbarton beat Elgin City 3-0. Results post-move did improve and in the end a mid-table 6th-place finish was achieved.

In the national cup competitions, there was some progress in all. In the Scottish Cup, Dumbarton defeated East Stirling in the first round, after a drawn match, but disappointingly lost in the next round to Stranraer.

In the League Cup, after an exciting penalties win over Ayr United, Dumbarton lost out to Livingston in the second round.

Finally, in the Scottish Challenge Cup, after nine unsuccessful attempts, Dumbarton finally won a first round tie - against Elgin City, but the optimism was short-lived as Arbroath would win the second round match-up.

Locally, in the Stirlingshire Cup, Dumbarton won one and lost one of their two group ties, and failed to progress.

== Results & fixtures ==
Win Draw Loss

=== Scottish Third Division ===
5 August 2000 Third Division	Hamilton	2–0	Dumbarton	New Douglas Park
	Eadie; Russell			Attendance: 588

12 August 2000 Third Division	Dumbarton	0–2	Brechin City	Cliftonhill Stadium
			Leask; Christie	Attendance: 370

19 August 2000 Third Division	Peterhead	2–0	Dumbarton	Balmoor Stadium
	Cooper; Johnston			Attendance: 630

26 August 2000 Third Division	Albion Rovers	0–1	Dumbarton	Cliftonhill Stadium
			Flannery	Attendance: 343

9 September 2000 Third Division	Dumbarton	1–2	East Stirling	Cliftonhill Stadium
	Flannery		Hislop; Stewart	Attendance: 259

16 September 2000 Third Division	Montrose	2–2	Dumbarton	Links Park
	McKenzie; O'Driscoll		Brown; Flannery	Attendance: 343

23 September 2000 Third Division	Dumbarton	2–4	Cowdenbeath	Cliftonhill Stadium
	King; Brown		Winter; Bradley; Wright; Burns	Attendance: 348

30 September 2000 Third Division	Elgin City	2–0	Dumbarton	Borough Briggs
	Clinton; Campbell			Attendance: 752

7 October 2000 Third Division	Dumbarton	2–3	East Fife	Cliftonhill Stadium
	Dillon; King		Mortimer; Moffat	Attendance: 256

14 October 2000 Third Division	Dumbarton	2–3	Hamilton	Cliftonhill Stadium
	Robertson; Flannery		Bonnar; Clark; Moore	Attendance: 368

21 October 2000 Third Division	Brechin City	3–1	Dumbarton	Glebe Park, Brechin
	Bain; Coulston; Leask		McCann	Attendance: 455

28 October 2000 Third Division	Dumbarton	0–1	Albion Rovers	Cliftonhill Stadium
			Shields	Attendance: 277

4 November 2000 Third Division	East Stirling	1–1	Dumbarton	Firs Park
	Lorimer		Flannery	Attendance: 246

11 November 2000 Third Division	Cowdenbeath	1–1	Dumbarton	Central Park, Cowdenbeath
	Burns		Bruce	Attendance: 341

18 November 2000 Third Division	Dumbarton	1–0	Montrose	Cliftonhill Stadium
	Grace			Attendance: 238

25 November 2000 Third Division	East Fife	1–0	Dumbarton	Bayview Stadium
	Ferguson			Attendance: 465

2 December 2000 Third Division	Dumbarton	3–0	Elgin City	Strathclyde Homes Stadium
	Flannery; Brown; Brittain			Attendance: 1,876

16 December 2000 Third Division	Hamilton	2–0	Dumbarton	New Douglas Park
	McFarlane			Attendance: 485

23 December 2000 Third Division	Dumbarton	1–3	Peterhead	Strathclyde Homes Stadium
	Brown		Cooper; Yates; Stewart	Attendance: 821

2 January 2001 Third Division	Dumbarton	3–0	East Stirling	Strathclyde Homes Stadium
	Smith; Flannery (o.g.)			Attendance: 658

27 January 2001 Third Division	Albion Rovers	1–3	Dumbarton	Cliftonhill Stadium
	Smith		Brown; Flannery	Attendance: 369

3 February 2001 Third Division	Dumbarton	2–0	East Fife	Strathclyde Homes Stadium
	Stewart; Brown			Attendance: 711

24 February 2001 Third Division	Dumbarton	1–0	Brechin City	Strathclyde Homes Stadium
	Flannery			Attendance: 722

7 March 2001 Third Division	Dumbarton	3–0	Cowdenbeath	Strathclyde Homes Stadium
	Dillon; Brown; Flannery			Attendance: 507

10 March 2001 Third Division	Dumbarton	1–4	Albion Rovers	Strathclyde Homes Stadium
	Flannery		Lumsden mcMullen; Harty	Attendance: 808

13 March 2001 Third Division	Elgin City	0–3	Dumbarton	Borough Briggs
			Dillon; Bruce; Brown	Attendance: 424

17 March 2001 Third Division	Cowdenbeath	2–2	Dumbarton	Central Park, Cowdenbeath
	McDowell; Wright		Flannery	Attendance: 369

20 March 2001 Third Division	East Stirling	0–0	Dumbarton	Firs Park
				Attendance: 208

24 March 2001 Third Division	Peterhead	0-1	Dumbarton	Balmoor Stadium
			Robertson	Attendance: 432

27 March 2001 Third Division	Montrose	1-2	Dumbarton	Links Park
	Hutchison		Brown; Flannery	Attendance: 165

21 March 2001 Third Division	Dumbarton	1–2	Montrose	Strathclyde Homes Stadium
	Flannery		Mitchell; Hutchison	Attendance: 751

7 April 2001 Third Division	East Fife	0-1	Dumbarton	Bayview Stadium
			Lynes	Attendance: 313

14 April 2001 Third Division	Dumbarton	2–0	Elgin City	Strathclyde Homes Stadium
	Brown; O'Neill			Attendance: 685

21 April 2001 Third Division	Dumbarton	1–2	Hamilton	Strathclyde Homes Stadium
	Lynes		McFarlane; Kerr	Attendance: 864

28 April 2001 Third Division	Brechin City	1-0	Dumbarton	Glebe Park, Brechin
	Grant			Attendance: 510

5 May 2001 Third Division	Dumbarton	2–2	Peterhead	Strathclyde Homes Stadium
	Stewart; Flannery		Cooper; Johnston	Attendance: 715

=== Bell's Challenge Cup ===
15 August 2000 Challenge Cup round 1	Elgin City	2–4	Dumbarton	Borough Briggs
	Green		Flannery; Brown	Attendance: 828; Referee: G Mitchell

29 August 2000 Challenge Cup round 2	Arbroath	2–0	Dumbarton	Gayfield Park
	Brownlie; Mallan			Attendance: 459; Referee: B Orr

=== CIS League Cup ===
9 August 2000 League Cup round 1	Dumbarton	0–0 (a.e.t.) (5-4 p)	Ayr United	Cliftonhill Stadium
				Attendance: 421; Referee: W Young

22 August 2000 League Cup round 2	Dumbarton	0–4	Livingston	Cliftonhill Stadium
			Bingham; Hagan	Attendance: 357; Referee: K Toner

=== Tennent's Scottish Cup ===
1 December 2000 Cup round 1	Dumbarton	1–1	East Stirling	Strathclyde Homes Stadium
	Flannery		Hislop	Attendance: 834; Referee: I Brines

12 December 2000 Cup round 1R	East Stirling	0–1	Dumbarton	Firs Park
			Robertson	Attendance: 170; Referee: I Brines

6 January 2001 Cup round 2	Stranraer	2–0	Dumbarton	Starks Park
	Walker; Harty			Attendance: 595; Referee: I Frickleton

=== Stirlingshire Cup ===
18 July 2000 Group stage	Alloa Athletic	4–1	Dumbarton	Recreation Park, Alloa
	Irvine 54', 57', 79'; Clark 73'		Brown 37'

22 July 2000 Group stage	Stenhousemuir	0–2	Dumbarton	Ochilview Park
			Brown; Smith

== League table ==
Pos	Team	Pld	W	D	L	GF	GA	GD	Pts
4	East Fife	36	15	8	13	49	46	+3	53
5	Peterhead	36	13	10	13	46	46	0	49
6	Dumbarton	36	13	6	17	46	49	−3	45
7	Albion Rovers	36	12	9	15	38	43	−5	45
8	East Stirlingshire	36	10	7	19	37	69	−32	37

Source: "2000-2001 Third Division - SPFL Archive". SPFL (in Malay).
Rules for classification: 1) points; 2) goal difference; 3) number of goals scored.

== Player statistics ==
=== Squad ===
No.	Pos	Nat	Player	Total		Third Division		League Cup		Challenge Cup		Scottish Cup	
No.	Pos	Nat	Player	Apps	Goals	Apps	Goals	Apps	Goals	Apps	Goals	Apps	Goals
	GK	(Scotland) SCO	John Hillcoat	34	0	27+0	0	2+0	0	2+0	0	3+0	0
	GK	(Scotland) SCO	John Wight	11	0	9+1	0	0+1	0	0+0	0	0+0	0
	DF	(Scotland) SCO	Craig Brittain	34	1	22+6	1	1+0	0	1+1	0	3+0	0
	DF	(Scotland) SCO	Jamie Bruce	33	2	29+0	2	1+0	0	0+0	0	3+0	0
	DF	(Scotland) SCO	Michael Dickie	37	0	29+1	0	2+0	0	2+0	0	3+0	0
	DF	(Scotland) SCO	Kevin McCann	33	1	23+4	1	2+0	0	2+0	0	2+0	0
	DF	(Scotland) SCO	Martin Melvin	18	0	0+17	0	0+0	0	0+0	0	0+1	0
	DF	(Scotland) SCO	Martin O'Neill	15	1	15+0	1	0+0	0	0+0	0	0+0	0
	DF	(Scotland) SCO	Dave Stewart	38	2	32+0	2	0+1	0	2+0	0	3+0	0
	MF	(Scotland) SCO	Steven Bonar	33	1	23+6	1	0+0	0	1+0	0	3+0	0
	MF	(Scotland) SCO	Alan Brown	1	0	1+0	0	0+0	0	0+0	0	0+0	0
	MF	(Scotland) SCO	G Dempsey	1	0	0+1	0	0+0	0	0+0	0	0+0	0
	MF	(Scotland) SCO	John Dillon	30	3	20+5	3	1+0	0	1+0	0	1+2	0
	MF	(Scotland) SCO	Chris Gentile	8	0	2+4	0	0+1	0	0+1	0	0+0	0
	MF	(Scotland) SCO	Alex Grace	19	1	12+2	1	1+1	0	1+0	0	2+0	0
	MF	(Scotland) SCO	Stephen Jack	34	0	25+3	0	2+0	0	2+0	0	2+0	0
	MF	(Scotland) SCO	Craig Lynes	8	2	8+0	2	0+0	0	0+0	0	0+0	0
	MF	(Scotland) SCO	Brian McGinty	1	0	0+1	0	0+0	0	0+0	0	0+0	0
	MF	(Scotland) SCO	John Ritchie	3	0	1+2	0	0+0	0	0+0	0	0+0	0
	MF	(Scotland) SCO	S Wilson	1	0	1+0	0	0+0	0	0+0	0	0+0	0
	MF	(Scotland) SCO	Willie Wilson	16	0	11+0	0	2+0	0	1+1	0	0+1	0
	FW	(Scotland) SCO	Andy Brown	38	10	31+0	9	2+0	0	2+0	1	3+0	0
	FW	(Scotland) SCO	Paddy Flannery	38	21	30+1	17	1+1	0	2+0	3	3+0	1
	FW	(Scotland) SCO	Toby King	13	2	9+0	2	2+0	0	2+0	0	0+0	0
	FW	(Scotland) SCO	Steve McCormick	3	0	1+2	0	0+0	0	0+0	0	0+0	0
	FW	(Scotland) SCO	Joe Robertson	38	3	27+6	2	2+0	0	1+0	0	2+0	1
	FW	(Scotland) SCO	Ryan Robinson	5	0	4+1	0	0+0	0	0+0	0	0+0	0
	FW	(Scotland) SCO	Chris Smith	18	1	4+9	1	1+1	0	0+0	0	0+3	0

=== Transfers ===
==== Players in ====
Player	From	Date
(Scotland) John Hillcoat	(Scotland) Queen of the South	15 Jul 2000
(Scotland) John Wight	(Scotland) Beith	4 Aug 2000
(Scotland) Willie Wilson	(Scotland) Cowdenbeath	4 Aug 2000
(Scotland) G Dempsey	(Scotland) (trialist)	12 Aug 2000
(Scotland) Brian McGinty	(Scotland) Airdrie	12 Aug 2000
(Scotland) Steve McCormick	(Scotland) Stranraer	23 Sep 2000
(Scotland) S Wilson	(Scotland) (trialist)	14 Oct 2000
(Scotland) Ryan Robinson	(Scotland) St Mirren (loan)	24 Jan 2001
(Scotland) Martin O'Neill	(Scotland) East Fife	29 Jan 2001
(Scotland) John Ritchie	(Scotland) Queen's Park	5 Feb 2001
(Scotland) Craig Lynes	(Scotland) East Stirling	25 Feb 2001

==== Players out ====
Player	To	Date
(Scotland) Toby King	(Scotland) Cowdenbeath	13 Nov 2000
(Scotland) Derek Barnes	(Scotland) Cowdenbeath	1 Dec 2000
(Scotland) Alex Grace	(Scotland) Stranraer	20 Jan 2001
(Scotland) Willie Wilson	(Scotland) East Fife	30 Jan 2001
(Scotland) Paul Finnigan	(Scotland) Dalry Thistle	
(Iceland) Hrienn Hringsson	(Iceland) KA Akureyri	
(Scotland) Kenny Meechan	(Scotland) Largs Thistle	
(Scotland) Billy Melvin	(Scotland) Lesmahagow	
(Scotland) Scott McHarg	(Scotland) Shotts BA	
(Scotland) Hugh Ward	(Scotland) Vale of Leven	
(Scotland) John McCormack		
(Scotland) Chris Gentile		

== Trivia ==
- The League match against Brechin City on 12 August marked Willie Wilson's 100th appearance for Dumbarton in all national competitions - the 115th Dumbarton player to reach this milestone.
- The League match against East Stirling on 9 September marked Craig Brittain's 100th appearance for Dumbarton in all national competitions - the 116th Dumbarton player to reach this milestone.
- The League match against Elgin City on 30 September marked Stephen Jack's 100th appearance for Dumbarton in all national competitions - the 117th Dumbarton player to reach this milestone.
- The League match against Elgin City on 2 December marked Alex Grace's and Paddy Flannery's 100th appearances for Dumbarton in all national competitions - the 118th and 119th Dumbarton players respectively to reach this milestone.
- The League match against Albion Rovers on 10 March marked Jamie Bruce's 100th appearance for Dumbarton in all national competitions - the 120th Dumbarton player to reach this milestone.
- The League match against Montrose on 31 March marked Joe Robertson's 100th appearance for Dumbarton in all national competitions - the 121st Dumbarton player to reach this milestone.

== See also ==
- 2000–01 in Scottish football
