= 1900–01 East Stirlingshire F.C. season =

East Stirlingshire
1900–01 season
- Stadium: Merchiston Park
- Scottish Football League Second Division: 7th
- Scottish Cup: First round (lost to Clyde)
- Stirlingshire Cup: Winners
- Highest home attendance: c. 2,500 v. Airdrieonians (18 August 1900, Division Two)

The 1900–01 season was East Stirlingshire Football Club's first season in the Scottish Football League, being admitted to the Scottish Football League Second Division. The club also competed in the Scottish Cup and the minor Stirlingshire Cup.

== Fixtures and results ==
Win Draw Loss Postponed

=== Scottish Second Division ===
18 August 1900 Second Division	East Stirlingshire	2 – 3	Airdrieonians	Merchiston Park, Bainsford
	,		,,	Attendance: 2,500

23 August 1900 Second Division	Motherwell	0 – 3	East Stirlingshire	Fir Park, Motherwell
			,,	Attendance: 2,000

1 September 1900 Second Division	East Stirlingshire	2 – 1	Ayr	Merchiston Park, Bainsford
	,		Goal

15 September 1900 Second Division	East Stirlingshire	3 – 4	Port Glasgow Athletic	Merchiston Park, Bainsford
	,,		,,,	Attendance: 2,000

29 September 1900 Second Division	East Stirlingshire	2 – 0	Abercorn	Merchiston Park, Bainsford
	,			Attendance: 2,000

1 December 1900 Second Division	East Stirlingshire	1 – 1	St Bernard's	Merchiston Park, Bainsford
	Goal		Goal

22 December 1900 Second Division	East Stirlingshire	2 – 1	Motherwell	Merchiston Park, Bainsford
	,		Goal

29 December 1900 Second Division	East Stirlingshire	1 – 1	Leith Athletic	Merchiston Park, Bainsford
	Goal		Goal

12 January 1901 Second Division	Hamilton Academical	5 – 0	East Stirlingshire	Douglas Park, Hamilton
	,,,,			Attendance: 500

19 January 1901 Second Division	St Bernard's	5 – 0	East Stirlingshire	Royal Gymnasium Ground, Edinburgh
	,,,,			Attendance: 500

16 February 1901 Second Division	Airdrieonians	2 – 1	East Stirlingshire	Broomfield Park, Airdrie
	,		Goal	Attendance: 2,500

23 February 1901 Second Division	East Stirlingshire	2 – 1	Clyde	Merchiston Park, Bainsford
	,		Goal

9 March 1901 Second Division	Abercorn	3 – 0	East Stirlingshire	Old Ralston Park, Paisley
	,,

23 March 1901 Second Division	Port Glasgow Athletic	3 – 2	East Stirlingshire	Clune Park, Port Glasgow
	,,		,

6 April 1901 Second Division	Ayr	3 – 2	East Stirlingshire	Somerset Park, Ayr
	,,		,

22 April 1901 Second Division	Clyde	3 – 3	East Stirlingshire	Shawfield, Rutherglen
	,,		,,	Attendance: 3,500

27 April 1901 Second Division	East Stirlingshire	3 – 1	Leith Athletic	Merchiston Park, Bainsford
	,,		Goal	Attendance: 500

4 May 1901 Second Division	East Stirlingshire	5 – 2	Hamilton Academical	Merchiston Park, Bainsford
	,,,,		,,

==== League table ====
Pos	Team	Pld	W	D	L	GF	GA	GD	Pts
4	Port Glasgow Athletic	18	10	0	8	45	43	+2	20
6	Ayr	18	9	0	9	32	34	−2	18
7	East Stirlingshire	18	7	3	8	34	39	−5	17
8	Hamilton Academical	18	4	4	10	41	49	−8	12
8	Leith Athletic	18	5	2	11	22	32	−10	12

Source: statto.com
Rules for classification: Teams finish equal if level on points. Points system: 2 points for a win, 1 point for a draw, 0 points for a loss

==== Results by round ====
Round	1	2	3	4	5	6	7	8	9	10	11	12	13	14	15	16	17	18
Ground	H	A	H	H	H	H	H	H	A	A	A	H	A	A	A	A	A	H
Result	L	W	W	L	W	D	W	D	L	L	L	W	L	L	L	D	W	W
Position	5	2	2	3	3	8	7	7	8	8	8	7	7	7	7	7	7	7

Source: statto.com
A = Away; H = Home; W = Win; D = Draw; L = Loss

=== Scottish Cup ===
5 January 1901 Round 1	Clyde	6 – 0	East Stirlingshire	Shawfield, Rutherglen
	,,,,,			Attendance: 3,000

=== Other ===
==== Stirlingshire Cup ====
Round 1	East Stirlingshire	W.O.	Dunipace

9 February 1901 Semi-final	East Stirlingshire	5 – 2	Stenhousemuir	Merchiston Park, Bainsford
	,,,,		,

2 March 1901 Final	East Stirlingshire	3 – 2	Camelon	Brockville Park, Falkirk
	,,		,

== See also ==
- List of East Stirlingshire F.C. seasons
