= 1903–04 East Stirlingshire F.C. season =

East Stirlingshire
1903–04 season
- Stadium: Merchiston Park
- Scottish Football League Second Division: 5th
- Stirlingshire Cup: Semi final
- Highest home attendance: c. 4,000 v. Stenhousemuir (5 March 1904, Stirlingshire Cup), v. Falkirk (12 March 1904, Stirlingshire Cup)

The 1903–04 season was East Stirlingshire Football Club's fourth season in the Scottish Football League, being admitted to the Scottish Football League Second Division. The club also competed in the minor Stirlingshire Cup.

== Fixtures and results ==
Win Draw Loss Postponed

=== Scottish Second Division ===
15 August 1903 Second Division	Raith Rovers	1 – 2	East Stirlingshire	Stark's Park, Kirkcaldy
	Goal		,	Attendance: 1,500

22 August 1903 Second Division	East Stirlingshire	3 – 1	St Bernard's	Merchiston Park, Bainsford
	,,		Goal	Attendance: 2,500

29 August 1903 Second Division	Falkirk	2 – 1	East Stirlingshire	Brockville Park, Falkirk
	,		Goal	Attendance: 3,000

12 September 1903 Second Division	East Stirlingshire	3 – 3	Arthurlie	Merchiston Park, Bainsford
	,,		,,	Attendance: 2,000

26 September 1903 Second Division	Ayr	2 – 1	East Stirlingshire	Somerset Park, Ayr
	,		Goal	Attendance: 1,500

10 October 1903 Second Division	Leith Athletic	4 – 0	East Stirlingshire	Chancelot Park, Leith
	,,,			Attendance: 2,000

17 October 1903 Second Division	East Stirlingshire	0 – 0	Hamilton Academical	Merchiston Park, Bainsford
				Attendance: 3,000

24 October 1903 Second Division	Arthurlie	2 – 2	East Stirlingshire	Dunterlie Park, Glasgow
	,		.

31 October 1903 Second Division	East Stirlingshire	2 – 0	Abercorn	Merchiston Park, Bainsford
	,

7 November 1903 Second Division	Ayr Parkhouse	2 – 1	East Stirlingshire	Beresford Park, Ayr
	,		Goal

14 November 1903 Second Division	Abercorn	3 – 2	East Stirlingshire	Old Ralston Park, Paisley
	,,		,

28 November 1903 Second Division	Clyde	5 – 1	East Stirlingshire	Shawfield, Rutherglen
	,,,,		Goal

19 December 1903 Second Division	St Bernard's	1 – 1	East Stirlingshire	Royal Gymnasium Ground, Edinburgh
	Goal		Goal

26 December 1903 Second Division	East Stirlingshire	3 – 0	Raith Rovers	Merchiston Park, Bainsford
	,,			Attendance: 1,000

9 January 1904 Second Division	East Stirlingshire	2 – 1	Falkirk	Merchiston Park, Bainsford
	,		Goal	Attendance: 3,000

23 January 1904 Second Division	Hamilton Academical	3 – 1	East Stirlingshire	Douglas Park, Hamilton
	,,		Goal	Attendance: 2,000

30 January 1904 Second Division	East Stirlingshire	1 – 0	Ayr Parkhouse	Merchiston Park, Bainsford
	Goal

6 February 1904 Second Division	East Stirlingshire	1 – 1	Ayr	Merchiston Park, Bainsford
	Goal		Goal

19 March 1904 Second Division	East Stirlingshire	3 – 2	Leith Athletic	Merchiston Park, Bainsford
	,,		,	Attendance: 1,500

26 March 1904 Second Division	East Stirlingshire	1 – 3	Clyde	Merchiston Park, Bainsford
	Goal		,,	Attendance: 2,000

23 April 1904 Second Division	Albion Rovers	2 – 0	East Stirlingshire	Meadow Park, Whifflet
	,

30 April 1904 Second Division	East Stirlingshire	4 – 2	Albion Rovers	Merchiston Park, Bainsford
	,,,		,

== Table ==
Pos	Team	Pld	W	D	L	GF	GA	GD	Pts
3	Ayr	22	11	6	5	34	31	+3	28
4	Falkirk	22	11	4	7	50	36	+14	26
5	East Stirlingshire	22	8	5	9	35	40	−5	21
5	Raith Rovers	22	8	5	9	40	38	+2	21
7	Leith Athletic	22	8	4	10	42	40	+2	20

Source: statto.com
Rules for classification: Teams finish equal if level on points. Points system: 2 points for a win, 1 point for a draw, 0 points for a loss

=== Results by round ===
Round	1	2	3	4	5	6	7	8	9	10	11	12	13	14	15	16	17	18	19	20	21	22
Ground	A	H	A	H	A	A	H	A	H	A	A	A	A	H	H	A	H	H	H	H	A	A
Result	W	W	L	D	L	L	D	D	W	L	L	L	D	W	W	L	W	D	W	L	L	W
Position	1	1	3	3	4	6	6	5	5	7	9	7	6	7	7	7	7	6	8	8	8	5

Source: statto.com
A = Away; H = Home; W = Win; D = Draw; L = Loss

=== Other ===
==== Stirlingshire Cup ====
16 January 1904 Round 1	East Stirlingshire	1 - 0	Grahamston Amateurs	Merchiston Park, Bainsford
	Goal

20 February 1904 Semi-final	East Stirlingshire	2 – 2	Stenhousemuir	Merchiston Park, Bainsford
	,		,	Attendance: 3,000

27 February 1904 Semi-Final Replay	Stenhousemuir	1 – 1	East Stirlingshire	Ochilview Park, Stenhousemuir
	Goal		Goal	Attendance: 3,000

5 March 1904 Semi-final 2nd replay	East Stirlingshire	2 – 0	Stenhousemuir	Brockville Park, Falkirk
	,			Attendance: 4,000

12 March 1904 Final	Falkirk	4 – 3	East Stirlingshire	Ochilview Park, Stenhousemuir
	,,,		,,	Attendance: 4,000

== See also ==
- List of East Stirlingshire F.C. seasons
