= 1904–05 East Stirlingshire F.C. season =

East Stirlingshire
1904–05 season
- Stadium: Merchiston Park
- Scottish Football League Second Division: 9th
- Stirlingshire Cup: Runners-up
- Highest home attendance: c. 4,000 v. Falkirk (10 September 1904, Division Two), v. Alloa Athletic (25 March 1905, Stirlingshire Cup)

The 1904–05 season was East Stirlingshire Football Club's fourth season in the Scottish Football League, being admitted to the Scottish Football League Second Division. The club also competed in the minor Stirlingshire Cup.

== Fixtures and results ==
Win Draw Loss Postponed

=== Scottish Second Division ===
20 August 1904 Second Division	East Stirlingshire	0 – 0	Leith Athletic	Merchiston Park, Bainsford
				Attendance: 3,000

27 August 1904 Second Division	Raith Rovers	4 – 1	East Stirlingshire	Stark's Park, Kirkcaldy
	,,,		Goal	Attendance: 1,200

10 September 1904 Second Division	East Stirlingshire	2 – 0	Falkirk	Merchiston Park, Bainsford
	,			Attendance: 4,000

24 September 1904 Second Division	Clyde	1 – 0	East Stirlingshire	Shawfield, Rutherglen
	Goal			Attendance: 2,000

15 October 1904 Second Division	East Stirlingshire	2 – 0	Ayr	Merchiston Park, Bainsford
	,			Attendance: 2,000

22 October 1904 Second Division	Abercorn	1 – 0	East Stirlingshire	Old Ralston Park, Paisley
	Goal

29 October 1904 Second Division	Falkirk	3 – 1	East Stirlingshire	Brockville, Falkirk
	,,		Goal	Attendance: 3,000

5 November 1904 Second Division	East Stirlingshire	1 – 4	Aberdeen	Merchiston Park, Bainsford
	Goal		,,,	Attendance: 2,000

12 November 1904 Second Division	Albion Rovers	4 – 4	East Stirlingshire	Meadow Park, Whifflet
	,,,		,,,

19 November 1904 Second Division	East Stirlingshire	4 – 0	St Bernard's	Merchiston Park, Bainsford
	,,,			Attendance: 1,200

3 December 1904 Second Division	East Stirlingshire	0 – 1	Hamilton Academical	Merchiston Park, Bainsford
			Goal

17 December 1904 Second Division	East Stirlingshire	5 – 2	Albion Rovers	Merchiston Park, Bainsford
	,,,,		,

24 December 1904 Second Division	East Stirlingshire	1 – 3	Raith Rovers	Merchiston Park, Bainsford
	Goal		,,	Attendance: 1,200

31 December 1904 Second Division	Aberdeen	3 – 0	East Stirlingshire	Pittodrie Stadium, Aberdeen
	,,			Attendance: 3,000

7 January 1905 Second Division	East Stirlingshire	5 – 2	Arthurlie	Merchiston Park, Bainsford
	,,,,		,	Attendance: 1,500

14 January 1905 Second Division	Ayr	1 – 0	East Stirlingshire	Somerset Park, Ayr
	Goal

21 January 1905 Second Division	Arthurlie	3 – 1	East Stirlingshire	Dunterlie Park, Glasgow
	,,		Goal

28 January 1905 Second Division	East Stirlingshire	3 – 1	Abercorn	Merchiston Park, Bainsford
	,,		Goal	Attendance: 2,000

4 February 1905 Second Division	Hamilton Academical	1 – 1	East Stirlingshire	Douglas Park, Hamilton
	Goal		Goal	Attendance: 1,500

11 February 1905 Second Division	Leith Athletic	1 – 3	East Stirlingshire	Old Logie Green, Edinburgh
	Goal		,,	Attendance: 1,500

18 February 1905 Second Division	St Bernard's	1 – 1	East Stirlingshire	Royal Gymnasium Ground, Edinburgh
	Goal		Goal

11 March 1905 Second Division	East Stirlingshire	2 – 2	Clyde	Merchiston Park, Bainsford
	,		,	Attendance: 1,000

== Table ==
Pos	Team	Pld	W	D	L	GF	GA	GD	Pts	Promotion or relegation
7	Aberdeen (P)	22	7	7	8	36	26	+10	21	Promoted to the 1905–06 Scottish Division One
8	Albion Rovers	22	8	4	10	38	53	−15	20	
9	East Stirlingshire	22	7	5	10	37	38	−1	19	
9	Raith Rovers	22	9	1	12	30	34	−4	19	
11	Abercorn	22	8	1	13	31	45	−14	17	

Source: statto.com
Rules for classification: Teams finish equal if level on points. Points system: 2 points for a win, 1 point for a draw, 0 points for a loss
(P) Promoted

=== Results by round ===
Round	1	2	3	4	5	6	7	8	9	10	11	12	13	14	15	16	17	18	19	20	21	22
Ground	H	A	H	A	H	A	A	H	A	H	H	H	H	A	H	A	A	H	A	A	A	H
Result	D	L	W	L	W	L	L	L	D	W	L	W	L	L	W	L	L	W	D	W	D	D
Position	6	9	5	7	7	9	10	11	12	9	10	10	10	11	10	10	11	10	10	9	9	8

Source: statto.com
A = Away; H = Home; W = Win; D = Draw; L = Loss

=== Other ===
==== Stirlingshire Cup ====
25 February 1905 Semi-final	East Stirlingshire	1 - 0	King's Park	Merchiston Park, Bainsford
	Goal

25 March 1905 Final	Alloa Athletic	1 – 0	East Stirlingshire	Brockville, Falkirk
	Goal			Attendance: 4,000

== See also ==
- List of East Stirlingshire F.C. seasons
