= 1902–03 East Stirlingshire F.C. season =

East Stirlingshire
1902–03 season
- Stadium: Merchiston Park
- Scottish Football League Second Division: 8th
- Stirlingshire Cup: Winners
- Highest home attendance: c. 4,000 v. Falkirk (30 August 1902, Division Two)

The 1902–03 season was East Stirlingshire Football Club's third season in the Scottish Football League, being admitted to the Scottish Football League Second Division. The club also competed in the Scottish Cup and the minor Stirlingshire Cup.

== Fixtures and results ==
Win Draw Loss Postponed

=== Scottish Second Division ===
16 August 1902 Second Division	East Stirlingshire	4 – 1	Raith Rovers	Merchiston Park, Bainsford
	,,,		Goal	Attendance: 3,000

23 August 1902 Second Division	Leith Athletic	1 – 4	East Stirlingshire	Chancelot Park, Leith
	Goal		,,,

30 August 1902 Second Division	East Stirlingshire	0 – 2	Falkirk	Merchiston Park, Bainsford
			,	Attendance: 4,000

13 September 1902 Second Division	St Bernard's	3 – 1	East Stirlingshire	Royal Gymnasium Ground, Edinburgh
	,,		Goal	Attendance: 150

27 September 1902 Second Division	East Stirlingshire	1 – 2	Arthurlie	Merchiston Park, Bainsford
	Goal		,

4 October 1902 Second Division	Clyde	0 – 1	East Stirlingshire	Shawfield, Rutherglen
			Goal

11 October 1902 Second Division	East Stirlingshire	2 – 1	Motherwell	Merchiston Park, Bainsford
	,		Goal	Attendance: 2,000

18 October 1902 Second Division	Arthurlie	2 – 1	East Stirlingshire	Dunterlie Park, Glasgow
	,		Goal

25 October 1902 Second Division	East Stirlingshire	5 – 2	Ayr	Merchiston Park, Bainsford
	,,,,		,	Attendance: 1,500

1 November 1902 Second Division	Airdrieonians	2 – 0	East Stirlingshire	Broomfield Park, Airdrie, Lanarkshire
	,

8 November 1902 Second Division	East Stirlingshire	2 – 5	Hamilton Academical	Merchiston Park, Bainsford
	,		,,,,	Attendance: 1,200

15 November 1902 Second Division	Abercorn	3 – 2	East Stirlingshire	Old Ralston Park, Paisley
	,,		,

22 November 1902 Second Division	East Stirlingshire	4 – 1	St Bernard's	Merchiston Park, Bainsford
	,,,		Goal

29 November 1902 Second Division	Hamilton Academical	3 – 1	East Stirlingshire	Douglas Park, Hamilton
	,,		,	Attendance: 800

6 December 1902 Second Division	East Stirlingshire	0 – 0	Airdrieonians	Merchiston Park, Bainsford
				Attendance: 3,000

13 December 1902 Second Division	Ayr	1 – 0	East Stirlingshire	Somerset Park, Ayr
	Goal			Attendance: 1,000

20 December 1902 Second Division	East Stirlingshire	6 – 4	Abercorn	Merchiston Park, Bainsford
	,,,,,		,,,	Attendance: 1,500

27 December 1902 Second Division	East Stirlingshire	3 – 2	Clyde	Merchiston Park, Bainsford
	,,		,	Attendance: 1,200

3 January 1903 Second Division	East Stirlingshire	5 – 1	Leith Athletic	Merchiston Park, Bainsford
	,,,,		Goal	Attendance: 1,500

31 January 1903 Second Division	Raith Rovers	1 – 0	East Stirlingshire	Stark's Park, Kirkcaldy
	Goal			Attendance: 1,500

28 February 1903 Second Division	Falkirk	2 – 2	East Stirlingshire	Brockville Park, Falkirk
	,		,	Attendance: 1,000

18 April 1903 Second Division	Motherwell	2 – 2	East Stirlingshire	Fir Park, Motherwell
	,		,	Attendance: 3,000

== Table ==
Pos	Team	Pld	W	D	L	GF	GA	GD	Pts
6	Falkirk	22	8	7	7	39	37	+2	23
6	Hamilton Academical	22	11	1	10	45	35	+10	23
8	East Stirlingshire	22	9	3	10	46	41	+5	21
9	Arthurlie	22	6	8	8	34	46	−12	20
10	Abercorn	22	5	2	15	35	58	−23	12

Source: statto.com
Rules for classification: Teams finish equal if level on points. Points system: 2 points for a win, 1 point for a draw, 0 points for a loss

=== Results by round ===
Round	1	2	3	4	5	6	7	8	9	10	11	12	13	14	15	16	17	18	19	20	21	22
Ground	H	A	H	A	H	A	H	A	H	A	H	A	H	A	H	A	H	H	H	A	A	A
Result	W	W	L	L	L	W	W	L	W	L	L	L	W	L	D	L	W	W	W	L	D	D
Position	1	1	3	6	6	6	4	5	3	4	5	7	6	7	7	7	6	6	6	6	7	8

Source: statto.com
A = Away; H = Home; W = Win; D = Draw; L = Loss

=== Other ===
==== Stirlingshire Cup ====
24 January 1903 Round 1	East Stirlingshire	9 - 0	Camelon	Merchiston Park, Bainsford
	,,,,,,,,

14 February 1903 Semi-final	Falkirk	1 – 3	East Stirlingshire	Brockville Park, Falkirk
	Goal		,,

28 March 1903 Final	East Stirlingshire	0 – 0	Stenhousemuir	Brockville Park, Falkirk

4 April 1903 Final replay	East Stirlingshire	3 – 0	Stenhousemuir	Merchiston Park, Bainsford
	,,			Attendance: 4,000

== See also ==
- List of East Stirlingshire F.C. seasons
