= 1901–02 East Stirlingshire F.C. season =

East Stirlingshire
1901–02 season
- Stadium: Merchiston Park
- Scottish Football League Second Division: 9th
- Stirlingshire Cup: Semi-final
- Highest home attendance: c. 3,000 v. Ayr (22 March 1902, Division Two)

The 1901–02 season was East Stirlingshire Football Club's second season in the Scottish Football League, being admitted to the Scottish Football League Second Division. The club also competed in the Scottish Cup and the minor Stirlingshire Cup.

== Fixtures and results ==
Win Draw Loss Postponed

=== Scottish Second Division ===
17 August 1901 Second Division	East Stirlingshire	2–4	Clyde	Merchiston Park, Bainsford
	,		,,,

24 August 1901 Second Division	East Stirlingshire	1–3	Motherwell	Merchiston Park, Bainsford
	Goal		,,	Attendance: 2,000

31 August 1901 Second Division	Partick Thistle	2–0	East Stirlingshire	Meadowside, Maryhill
	,			Attendance: 4,000

14 September 1901 Second Division	East Stirlingshire	0–0	St Bernard's	Merchiston Park, Bainsford
				Attendance: 2,000

21 September 1901 Second Division	Leith Athletic	1–0	East Stirlingshire	Chancelot Park, Leith
	Goal

28 September 1901 Second Division	Airdrieonians	3–0	East Stirlingshire	Broomfield Park, Lanarkshire
	,,			Attendance: 2,000

5 October 1901 Second Division	East Stirlingshire	4–1	Hamilton Academical	Merchiston Park, Bainsford
	,,,		Goal	Attendance: 2,500

12 October 1901 Second Division	East Stirlingshire	1–4	Port Glasgow Athletic	Merchiston Park, Bainsford
	Goal		,,,

19 October 1901 Second Division	Arthurlie	3–3	East Stirlingshire	Dunterlie Park, Glasgow
	,,		,,	Attendance: 3,000

2 November 1901 Second Division	East Stirlingshire	1–3	Partick Thistle	Merchiston Park, Bainsford
	Goal		,,	Attendance: 1,500

9 November 1901 Second Division	Hamilton Academical	2–3	East Stirlingshire	Douglas Park, Hamilton
	,		,,	Attendance: 2,500

16 November 1901 Second Division	East Stirlingshire	4–1	Abercorn	Merchiston Park, Bainsford
	,,,		Goal	Attendance: 2,000

23 November 1901 Second Division	Port Glasgow Athletic	6–2	East Stirlingshire	Clune Park, Port Glasgow
	,,,,,		,

30 November 1901 Second Division	East Stirlingshire	3–1	Airdrieonians	Merchiston Park, Bainsford
	,,		,	Attendance: 2,000

7 December 1901 Second Division	St Bernard's	2–1	East Stirlingshire	Royal Gymnasium Ground, Edinburgh
	,		Goal

21 December 1901 Second Division	East Stirlingshire	1–1	Arthurlie	Merchiston Park, Bainsford
	Goal		Goal	Attendance: 2,000

11 January 1902 Second Division	East Stirlingshire	2–1	Leith Athletic	Merchiston Park, Bainsford
	,		Goal

18 January 1902 Second Division	Clyde	0–2	East Stirlingshire	Shawfield, Rutherglen
			,

25 January 1902 Second Division	Motherwell	2–3	East Stirlingshire	Fir Park, Motherwell
	,		,,	Attendance: 3,000

22 February 1902 Second Division	Abercorn	5–4	East Stirlingshire	Old Ralston Park, Paisley
	,,,,		,,,	Attendance: 200

1 March 1902 Second Division	Ayr	0–1	East Stirlingshire	Somerset Park, Ayr
			Goal	Attendance: 1,000

22 March 1902 Second Division	East Stirlingshire	0–1	Ayr	Merchiston Park, Bainsford
			Goal	Attendance: 3,000

==== League table ====
Pos	Team	Pld	W	D	L	GF	GA	GD	Pts	Promotion or relegation
1	Port Glasgow Athletic (C, P)	22	14	4	4	75	31	+44	32	Promoted to the 1902–03 Scottish Division One
2	Partick Thistle (P)	22	13	4	5	50	29	+21	30	Promoted to the 1902–03 Scottish Division One
3	Motherwell	22	12	2	8	50	44	+6	26	
4	Airdrieonians	22	10	5	7	41	32	+9	25	
4	Hamilton Academical	22	11	3	8	45	40	+5	25	
6	St Bernard's	22	10	2	10	30	31	−1	22	
7	Ayr	22	8	5	9	27	33	−6	21	
7	Leith Athletic	22	9	3	10	34	38	−4	21	
9	East Stirlingshire	22	8	3	11	38	46	−8	19	
10	Arthurlie	22	6	5	11	32	42	−10	17	
11	Abercorn	22	4	5	13	27	59	−32	13	
11	Clyde	22	5	3	14	21	45	−24	13	

Source: statto.com
Rules for classification: Teams finish equal if level on points. Points system: 2 points for a win, 1 point for a draw, 0 points for a loss
(C) Champions; (P) Promoted

==== Results by round ====
Round	1	2	3	4	5	6	7	8	9	10	11	12	13	14	15	16	17	18	19	20	21	22
Ground	H	H	A	H	A	A	H	H	A	H	A	H	A	H	A	H	H	A	A	A	A	H
Result	L	L	L	D	L	L	W	L	D	L	L	W	L	W	L	D	W	W	W	L	W	L
Position	7	10	11	11	12	12	12	12	12	12	12	11	11	10	11	9	10	6	5	6	5	9

Source: statto.com
A = Away; H = Home; W = Win; D = Draw; L = Loss

=== Other ===
==== Stirlingshire Cup ====
26 October 1901 Round 1	King's Park	1–3	East Stirlingshire	Forthbank Park, Stirling
	Goal		,,

15 February 1902 Semi-final	East Stirlingshire	0–1	Stenhousemuir	Merchiston Park, Bainsford
			Goal

== See also ==
- List of East Stirlingshire F.C. seasons
