= Chris Templeman =

Scottish footballer

Personal information
- Full name: Christopher Templeman
- Date of birth: 11 September 1980 (age 46)
- Place of birth: Kirkcaldy, Scotland
- Position: Striker

Senior career*
Years	Team	Apps	(Gls)
1997–2001	Dunfermline Athletic	15	(0)
1999–2000	→ Dumbarton (loan)	3	(3)
2000–2001	→ Stirling Albion (loan)	9	(2)
2001	Stirling Albion	12	(1)
2001–2004	Brechin City	118	(56)
2004–2008	Greenock Morton	89	(21)
2006	→ Brechin City (loan)	9	(0)
2008–2009	East Fife	46	(7)
2009–2016	Forfar Athletic	216	(53)
2016–2018	Montrose	82	(24)
2019-2020	Crossgates Primrose	?	(?)
Total		599	(167)
- * Club domestic league appearances and goals

Chris Templeman (born 11 September 1980 in Kirkcaldy) is a Scottish former footballer who played as a striker. He played for several Scottish Football League sides, spending 7 years with Forfar Athletic as well as making appearances in the Scottish Premier League for Dunfermline Athletic.

== Career ==
=== Dunfermline Athletic ===
His career started with Dunfermline Athletic, the club he supported as a boy, and, while there, he spent time on loan at Dumbarton and Stirling Albion.

=== Brechin City ===
After signing for Brechin City on a permanent basis he was instrumental in guiding them to the Scottish Football League First Division in season 2002–03.

=== Greenock Morton ===
Greenock Morton then paid a "considerable fee" to sign him.

After a poor start at Cappielow, punctuated by a return to Brechin City on loan, Templeman became a regular starter and important player at Cappielow, his most famous goals probably being his double against SPL side Kilmarnock in the Scottish Cup Third Round, where Morton won 3–1. However, by the start of the 2007–08 season, with Morton having won promotion to the First Division, Templeman's playing time began to decrease, largely in favour of Peter Weatherson and Iain Russell. He came on frequently as a substitute in the second half, notching up three goals in cup competitions.

=== East Fife ===
On 17 January 2008, it was announced that Sanny would be moving to East Fife. It was not announced if a transfer fee was paid. However, by 21 January he was an East Fife player.

=== Forfar Athletic ===
In June 2009, Templeman joined Forfar Athletic after being released by East Fife. After 7 years and over 250 appearances for the Loons, Templeman was released by Forfar in January 2016, signing for Scottish League Two side Montrose shortly after leaving Station Park.

=== Montrose ===
Templeman spent 2 and a half years with Montrose, before announcing his retirement in May 2018.

=== Crossgates Primrose ===
After a year out, Templeman returned to the game with Junior Fife club Crossgates Primrose where he played for one season before once again retiring.

== Career statistics ==
As of 25 May 2018

Appearances and goals by club, season and competition
Club	Season	League			Scottish Cup		League Cup		Other		Total	
Club	Season	Division	Apps	Goals	Apps	Goals	Apps	Goals	Apps	Goals	Apps	Goals
Dunfermline Athletic	1998–99	Scottish Premier League	12	0	0	0	0	0	0	0	12	0
Dunfermline Athletic	1999–2000	Scottish First Division	2	0	0	0	0	0	0	0	2	0
Dunfermline Athletic	2000–01	Scottish Premier League	1	0	0	0	0	0	—		1	0
Dunfermline Athletic	Total		15	0	0	0	0	0	0	0	15	0
Dumbarton (loan)	1999–2000	Scottish Third Division	3	3	0	0	0	0	0	0	3	3
Stirling Albion (loan)	2000–01	Scottish Second Division	9	2	2	1	0	0	0	0	11	3
Stirling Albion	2000–01	Scottish Second Division	12	1	1	1	0	0	0	0	13	2
Stirling Albion	Total		21	3	3	2	0	0	0	0	24	5
Brechin City	2001–02	Scottish Third Division	35	15	2	0	1	0	4 (Note: Appearances in the Scottish Challenge Cup)	1	42	16
Brechin City	2002–03	Scottish Second Division	35	22	1	0	0	0	5	2	41	24
Brechin City	2003–04	Scottish First Division	32	5	1	0	3	1	2	1	38	7
Brechin City	2004–05	Scottish Second Division	16	14	0	0	2	2	1	0	19	16
Brechin City	Total		118	56	4	0	6	3	12	4	140	63
Greenock Morton	2004–05	Scottish Second Division	19	7	0	0	0	0	0	0	19	7
Greenock Morton	2005–06	Scottish Second Division	19	2	1	0	1	0	3	1	24	3
Greenock Morton	2006–07	Scottish Second Division	35	12	3	2	1	0	3	0	42	14
Greenock Morton	2007–08	Scottish First Division	16	0	1	1	1	0	2	0	20	1
Greenock Morton	Total		89	21	5	3	3	0	8	1	105	25
Brechin City (loan)	2005–06	Scottish First Division	9	0	0	0	0	0	0	0	9	0
East Fife	2007–08	Scottish Third Division	13	3	0	0	0	0	0	0	13	3
East Fife	2008–09	Scottish Second Division	33	4	3	0	1	0	1	0	38	4
East Fife	Total		46	7	3	0	1	0	1	0	51	7
Forfar Athletic	2009–10	Scottish Third Division	32	5	1	0	1	0	6 (Note: Two appearances and a goal in the Scottish Challenge Cup; four appearances in the Second Division play-offs)	1	40	6
Forfar Athletic	2010–11	Scottish Second Division	34	10	0	0	1	1	2 (Note: Appearances in the First Division play-offs)	1	37	12
Forfar Athletic	2011–12	Scottish Second Division	33	16	1	0	2	1	1	0	37	17
Forfar Athletic	2012–13	Scottish Second Division	35	11	2	0	1	0	4 (Note: Two appearances in the Scottish Challenge Cup; two appearances and two goals in the First Division play-offs)	2	42	13
Forfar Athletic	2013–14	Scottish League One	36	5	4	3	2	0	0	0	42	8
Forfar Athletic	2014–15	Scottish League One	31	5	1	0	1	0	5 (Note: One appearance in the Scottish Challenge Cup; four appearances and a goal in the Championship play-offs)	1	38	6
Forfar Athletic	2015–16	Scottish League One	15	1	2	1	2	0	2	0	21	2
Forfar Athletic	Total		216	53	11	4	10	2	20	5	257	64
Montrose	2015–16	Scottish League Two	13	3	0	0	0	0	0	0	13	3
Montrose	2016–17	Scottish League Two	34	10	2	1	3	0	4 (Note: Two appearances in the Scottish Challenge Cup; two appearances and a goal in the League One play-offs)	1	43	12
Montrose	2017–18	Scottish League Two	35	11	3	0	3	0	2	0	43	11
Montrose	Total		82	24	5	1	6	0	6	1	99	26
Career total			599	167	31	10	26	5	47	11	703	193

== Honours ==
Greenock Morton

- Scottish Football League Second Division: 1

2006–07

Brechin City

- Scottish Football League Third Division: 1

2001–02

Montrose

- Scottish League Two: 1

2017-18
