= 1931–32 East Stirlingshire F.C. season =

East Stirlingshire
1931–32 season
- Stadium: Firs Park
- Division Two: 1st
- Scottish Cup: First round (lost to Dunfermline Athletic)
- Stirlingshire Cup: Winners
- Highest home attendance: c. 5,000 v. St Johnstone (12 March 1932, Division Two)
Home colours

The 1931–32 season was East Stirlingshire Football Club's eighth consecutive season in the Scottish Division Two, having been promoted from the inaugural Division Three in 1923–24. The club also competed in the Scottish Cup and the minor Stirlingshire Cup.

== Fixtures and results ==
Win Draw Loss Postponed

=== Scottish Second Division ===
8 August 1931 Division Two	Queen of the South	5 – 1	East Stirlingshire	Palmerston Park, Dumfries
	,,,,		Goal	Attendance: 3,000

15 August 1931 Division Two	East Stirlingshire	5 – 1	Albion Rovers	Firs Park, Falkirk
	,,,,		Goal	Attendance: 2,000

22 August 1931 Division Two	Bo'ness	2 – 5	East Stirlingshire	Newtown Park, Bo'ness
	,		,,,,	Attendance: 1,500

26 August 1931 Division Two	East Stirlingshire	2 – 1	Alloa Athletic	Firs Park, Falkirk
	,		Goal	Attendance: 2,000

29 August 1931 Division Two	East Stirlingshire	1 – 0	Arbroath	Firs Park, Falkirk
	Goal			Attendance: 2,000

5 September 1931 Division Two	King's Park	2 – 3	East Stirlingshire	Forthbank Park, Stirling
	,		,,	Attendance: 3,000

8 September 1931 Division Two	Stenhousemuir	1 – 4	East Stirlingshire	Ochilview Park, Stenhousemuir
	Goal		,,,	Attendance: 1,500

12 September 1931 Division Two	East Stirlingshire	3 – 0	Dumbarton	Firs Park, Falkirk
	,,			Attendance: 2,000

19 September 1931 Division Two	East Fife	2 – 0	East Stirlingshire	Bayview Park, Methil
	,			Attendance: 3,500

26 September 1931 Division Two	East Stirlingshire	4 – 1	Dunfermline Athletic	Firs Park, Falkirk
	,,,		Goal	Attendance: 2,000

3 October 1931 Division Two	Hibernian	1 – 1	East Stirlingshire	Easter Road, Edinburgh
	Goal		Goal	Attendance: 5,000

10 October 1931 Division Two	East Stirlingshire	2 – 0	Brechin City	Firs Park, Falkirk
	,			Attendance: 2,000

17 October 1931 Division Two	Edinburgh City	0 – 2	East Stirlingshire	Powderhall, Edinburgh
			,	Attendance: 300

24 October 1931 Division Two	East Stirlingshire	4 – 1	Montrose	Firs Park, Falkirk
	,,,		Goal	Attendance: 1,000

31 October 1931 Division Two	St Johnstone	2 – 2	East Stirlingshire	Muirton Park, Perth
	,		,	Attendance: 5,000

7 November 1931 Division Two	East Stirlingshire	6 – 1	Armadale	Firs Park, Falkirk
	,,,,,		Goal	Attendance: 1,000

14 November 1931 Division Two	East Stirlingshire	5 – 0	Forfar Athletic	Firs Park, Falkirk
	,,,,			Attendance: 1,000

21 November 1931 Division Two	St Bernard's	0 – 4	East Stirlingshire	Royal Gymnasium Ground, Edinburgh
			,,,	Attendance: 1,500

28 November 1931 Division Two	Raith Rovers	4 – 2	East Stirlingshire	Stark's Park, Kirkcaldy
	,,,		,	Attendance: 4,000

12 December 1931 Division Two	Alloa Athletic	1 – 2	East Stirlingshire	Recreation Park, Alloa
	Goal		,	Attendance: 3,000

19 December 1931 Division Two	East Stirlingshire	5 – 0	Queen of the South	Firs Park, Falkirk
	,,,,			Attendance: 2,000

26 December 1931 Division Two	Albion Rovers	3 – 2	East Stirlingshire	Cliftonhill, Coatbridge
	,,		,	Attendance: 1,500

1 January 1932 Division Two	East Stirlingshire	3 – 1	King's Park	Firs Park, Falkirk
	,,		Goal	Attendance: 4,000

2 January 1932 Division Two	Dumbarton	2 – 3	East Stirlingshire	Boghead Park, Dumbarton
	,		,,	Attendance: 2,000

9 January 1932 Division Two	East Stirlingshire	5 – 2	Bo'ness	Firs Park, Falkirk
	,,,,		,	Attendance: 2,000

23 January 1932 Division Two	Arbroath	3 – 1	East Stirlingshire	Gayfield Park, Arbroath
	,,		Goal	Attendance: 1,500

30 January 1932 Division Two	East Stirlingshire	5 – 1	East Fife	Firs Park, Falkirk
	,,,,		Goal	Attendance: 2,000

6 February 1932 Division Two	Dunfermline Athletic	2 – 1	East Stirlingshire	East End Park, Dunfermline
	,		Goal	Attendance: 3,000

13 February 1932 Division Two	East Stirlingshire	4 – 1	Hibernian	Firs Park, Falkirk
	,,,		Goal	Attendance: 3,000

20 February 1932 Division Two	Brechin City	0 – 1	East Stirlingshire	Glebe Park, Brechin
			Goal	Attendance: 600

27 February 1932 Division Two	East Stirlingshire	6 – 4	Edinburgh City	Firs Park, Falkirk
	,,,,,		,,,	Attendance: 1,000

5 March 1932 Division Two	Montrose	0 – 3	East Stirlingshire	Links Park, Montrose
			,,	Attendance: 1,000

12 March 1932 Division Two	East Stirlingshire	0 – 1	St Johnstone	Firs Park, Falkirk
			Goal	Attendance: 5,000

19 March 1932 Division Two	Armadale	1 – 0	East Stirlingshire	Volunteer Park, Armadale
	Goal			Attendance: 400

26 March 1932 Division Two	Forfar Athletic	6 – 3	East Stirlingshire	Station Park, Forfar
	,,,,,		,,	Attendance: 1,000

2 April 1932 Division Two	East Stirlingshire	5 – 1	St Bernard's	Firs Park, Falkirk
	,,,,		Goal	Attendance: 2,000

9 April 1932 Division Two	East Stirlingshire	5 – 1	Raith Rovers	Firs Park, Falkirk
	,,,,		Goal	Attendance: 4,000

16 April 1932 Division Two	East Stirlingshire	1 – 1	Stenhousemuir	Firs Park, Falkirk
	Goal		Goal	Attendance: 4,000

==== League table ====
Pos	Team	Pld	W	D	L	GF	GA	GR	Pts	Promotion or relegation
1	East Stirlingshire (C, P)	38	26	3	9	111	55	2.018	55	Promotion to 1932–33 Scottish First Division
2	St Johnstone (P)	38	24	7	7	102	52	1.962	55	Promotion to 1932–33 Scottish First Division
3	Raith Rovers	38	20	6	12	83	65	1.277	46	
4	Stenhousemuir	38	19	8	11	88	76	1.158	46	
5	St Bernard's	38	19	7	12	81	62	1.306	45	

Source: statto.com
Rules for classification: 1) points; 2) goal ratio.
(C) Champions; (P) Promoted

==== Results by round ====
Round	1	2	3	4	5	6	7	8	9	10	11	12	13	14	15	16	17	18	19	20	21	22	23	24	25	26	27	28	29	30	31	32	33	34	35	36	37	38
Ground	A	H	A	H	H	A	A	H	A	H	A	H	A	H	A	H	H	A	A	A	H	A	H	A	H	A	H	A	H	A	H	A	H	A	A	H	H	H
Result	L	W	W	W	W	W	W	W	L	W	D	W	W	W	D	W	W	W	L	W	W	L	W	W	W	L	W	L	W	W	W	W	L	L	L	W	W	D
Position	16	8	8	4	4	3	1	1	1	1	1	1	1	1	1	1	1	1	1	1	1	1	1	1	1	1	1	1	1	1	1	1	1	1	1	1	1	1

Source: statto.com
A = Away; H = Home; W = Win; D = Draw; L = Loss

=== Scottish Cup ===
16 January 1932 Round 1	Dunfermline Athletic	5 – 2	East Stirlingshire	East End Park, Dunfermline
	,,,,		,	Attendance: 4,056

=== Other ===
==== Stirlingshire Cup ====
6 April 1932 Round 2	King's Park	3 – 4	East Stirlingshire	Forthbank Park, Stirling
	,,		,,,

23 April 1932 Semi-final	East Stirlingshire	1 – 0	Falkirk	Firs Park, Falkirk
	Goal	Report

30 April 1932 Final	East Stirlingshire	2 – 1	Stenhousemuir
	,		Goal

== See also ==
- List of East Stirlingshire F.C. seasons
