= 1947–48 Scottish Division C =

Scottish Division C
- Season: 1947–48
- Champions: East Stirlingshire
- Promoted: East Stirlingshire

The 1947-48 Scottish Division C was won by East Stirlingshire who were promoted to the Division B. Raith Rovers 'A' finished bottom. It was the second season of short-lived Scottish Division C and featured seven reserve teams.

== Table ==
| Pos | Team | Pld | W | D | L | GF | GA | GD | Pts | Promotion or relegation |
|---|---|---|---|---|---|---|---|---|---|---|
| 1 | East Stirlingshire | 22 | 18 | 3 | 1 | 72 | 26 | +46 | 39 | Promotion to the 1948–49 Division B |
| 2 | East Fife 'A' | 22 | 16 | 3 | 3 | 63 | 37 | +26 | 35 | Left the League |
| 3 | Forfar Athletic | 22 | 14 | 4 | 4 | 67 | 37 | +30 | 32 | |
| 4 | Kilmarnock 'A' | 22 | 10 | 3 | 9 | 52 | 41 | +11 | 23 | |
| 5 | St Johnstone 'A' | 22 | 9 | 4 | 9 | 44 | 51 | −7 | 22 | |
| 6 | Dundee United 'A' | 22 | 9 | 2 | 11 | 55 | 57 | −2 | 20 | |
| 7 | Montrose | 22 | 7 | 5 | 10 | 42 | 69 | −27 | 19 | |
| 8 | Arbroath 'A' | 22 | 7 | 4 | 11 | 45 | 57 | −12 | 18 | Left the League |
| 9 | Leith Athletic 'A' | 22 | 7 | 3 | 12 | 44 | 60 | −16 | 17 | Left the League |
| 10 | Brechin City | 22 | 6 | 4 | 12 | 43 | 54 | −11 | 16 | |
| 11 | Edinburgh City | 22 | 6 | 3 | 13 | 51 | 58 | −7 | 15 | |
| 12 | Raith Rovers 'A' | 22 | 3 | 2 | 17 | 36 | 67 | −31 | 8 | |
