= Ralston Park =

Ralston Park may refer to:

- New Ralston Park, the home ground of Abercorn between 1909 and 1920
- Old Ralston Park, the home ground of Abercorn between 1899 and 1909
