= 1962–63 East Stirlingshire F.C. season =

East Stirlingshire
1962–63 season
- Stadium: Firs Park
- Division Two: 2nd
- Scottish Cup: Third round
- Scottish League Cup: Group stage
- Stirlingshire Cup: First round
- Highest home attendance: 7,419 v. Morton (4 May 1963, Division Two)
- Lowest home attendance: 761 v. Arbroath (26 September 1962, Division Two)

The 1962–63 season was East Stirlingshire Football Club's eighth consecutive season in the Scottish Division Two, having been re-elected to Scottish Football League in 1955–56. The club also competed in the Scottish Cup, Scottish League Cup and the minor Stirlingshire Cup.

== Fixtures and results ==
Win Draw Loss Postponed

=== Scottish Second Division ===
| 8 September 1962 Division Two | East Stirlingshire | 2 – 1 | Berwick Rangers | Firs Park, Falkirk |
| | , | | Goal | Attendance: 1,091 |

| 15 September 1962 Division Two | St Johnstone | 5 – 2 | East Stirlingshire | Muirton Park, Perth |
| | ,,,, | | , | Attendance: 5,914 |

| 19 September 1962 Division Two | Arbroath | 5 – 2 | East Stirlingshire | Gayfield Park, Arbroath |
| | ,,,, | | , | Attendance: 1,141 |

| 22 September 1962 Division Two | East Stirlingshire | 4 – 1 | Forfar Athletic | Firs Park, Falkirk |
| | ,,, | | Goal | Attendance: 779 |

| 26 September 1962 Division Two | East Stirlingshire | 3 – 0 | Arbroath | Firs Park, Falkirk |
| | ,, | | | Attendance: 761 |

| 29 September 1962 Division Two | Queen's Park | 1 – 1 | East Stirlingshire | Hampden Park, Glasgow |
| | Goal | | Goal | Attendance: 1,752 |

| 6 October 1962 Division Two | East Stirlingshire | 4 – 2 | Albion Rovers | Firs Park, Falkirk |
| | ,,, | | , | Attendance: 1,196 |

| 13 October 1962 Division Two | Morton | 2 – 3 | East Stirlingshire | Cappielow, Greenock |
| | , | | ,, | Attendance: 7,476 |

| 20 October 1962 Division Two | East Stirlingshire | 1 – 0 | Alloa Athletic | Firs Park, Falkirk |
| | Goal | | | Attendance: 1,324 |

| 27 October 1962 Division Two | Brechin City | 1 – 3 | East Stirlingshire | Glebe Park, Brechin |
| | Goal | | ,, | Attendance: 357 |

| 3 November 1962 Division Two | East Stirlingshire | 3 – 1 | Hamilton Academical | Firs Park, Falkirk |
| | ,, | | Goal | Attendance: 1,284 |

| 10 November 1962 Division Two | East Fife | 2 – 2 | East Stirlingshire | Bayview Park, Methil |
| | , | | , | Attendance: 2,056 |

| 17 November 1962 Division Two | East Stirlingshire | 2 – 2 | Stenhousemuir | Firs Park, Falkirk |
| | , | | , | Attendance: 1,689 |

| 24 November 1962 Division Two | East Stirlingshire | 3 – 1 | Ayr United | Firs Park, Falkirk |
| | ,, | | Goal | Attendance: 1,731 |

| 1 December 1962 Division Two | Cowdenbeath | 2 – 1 | East Stirlingshire | Central Park, Cowdenbeath |
| | , | | Goal | Attendance: 1,908 |

| 8 December 1962 Division Two | Montrose | 3 – 1 | East Stirlingshire | Links Park, Montrose |
| | ,, | | Goal | Attendance: 1,185 |

| 15 December 1962 Division Two | East Stirlingshire | 6 – 0 | Stranraer | Firs Park, Falkirk |
| | ,,,,, | | | Attendance: 1,058 |

| 9 March 1963 Division Two | Hamilton Academical | 1 – 3 | East Stirlingshire | Douglas Park, Hamilton |
| | Goal | | ,, | Attendance: 3,113 |

| 13 March 1963 Division Two | East Stirlingshire | 3 – 1 | Dumbarton | Firs Park, Falkirk |
| | ,, | | Goal | Attendance: 1,422 |

| 16 March 1963 Division Two | East Stirlingshire | 2 – 1 | East Fife | Firs Park, Falkirk |
| | , | | Goal | Attendance: 1,788 |

| 23 March 1963 Division Two | Stenhousemuir | 1 – 2 | East Stirlingshire | Ochilview Park, Stenhousemuir |
| | Goal | | , | Attendance: 1,557 |

| 27 March 1963 Division Two | Dumbarton | 2 – 2 | East Stirlingshire | Boghead Park, Dumbarton |
| | , | | , | Attendance: 1,021 |

| 30 March 1963 Division Two | Ayr United | 1 – 4 | East Stirlingshire | Somerset Park, Ayr |
| | Goal | | ,,, | Attendance: 1,013 |

| 3 April 1963 Division Two | Berwick Rangers | 1 – 1 | East Stirlingshire | Shielfield Park, Berwick-upon-Tweed |
| | Goal | | Goal | Attendance: 908 |

| 6 April 1963 Division Two | East Stirlingshire | 3 – 0 | Cowdenbeath | Firs Park, Falkirk |
| | ,, | | | Attendance: 1,434 |

| 10 April 1963 Division Two | Forfar Athletic | 3 – 1 | East Stirlingshire | Station Park, Forfar |
| | ,, | | Goal | Attendance: 939 |

| 13 April 1963 Division Two | East Stirlingshire | 2 – 2 | Montrose | Firs Park, Falkirk |
| | , | | , | Attendance: 1,389 |

| 20 April 1963 Division Two | Stranraer | 2 – 2 | East Stirlingshire | Stair Park, Stranraer |
| | , | | , | Attendance: 774 |

| 24 April 1963 Division Two | East Stirlingshire | 5 – 1 | Queen's Park | Firs Park, Falkirk |
| | ,,,, | | Goal | Attendance: 1,255 |

| 27 April 1963 Division Two | East Stirlingshire | 2 – 0 | Stirling Albion | Firs Park, Falkirk |
| | , | | | Attendance: 2,147 |

| 29 April 1963 Division Two | East Stirlingshire | 2 – 1 | Brechin City | Firs Park, Falkirk |
| | , | | Goal | Attendance: 1,270 |

| 1 May 1963 Division Two | Albion Rovers | 2 – 0 | East Stirlingshire | Cliftonhill, Coatbridge |
| | , | | | Attendance: 891 |

| 4 May 1963 Division Two | East Stirlingshire | 2 – 0 | Morton | Firs Park, Falkirk |
| | , | | | Attendance: 7,419 |

| 6 May 1963 Division Two | East Stirlingshire | 0 – 0 | St Johnstone | Firs Park, Falkirk |
| | | | | Attendance: 5,941 |

| 11 May 1963 Division Two | Alloa Athletic | 0 – 0 | East Stirlingshire | Recreation Park, Alloa |
| | | | | Attendance: 2,368 |

| 13 May 1963 Division Two | Stirling Albion | 2 – 1 | East Stirlingshire | Annfield, Stirling |
| | | | | Attendance: 834 |

==== League table ====
| Pos | Team | Pld | W | D | L | GF | GA | GR | Pts | Promotion or relegation |
|---|---|---|---|---|---|---|---|---|---|---|
| 1 | St Johnstone (C, P) | 36 | 25 | 5 | 6 | 83 | 37 | 2.243 | 55 | Promotion to 1963–64 Scottish First Division |
| 2 | East Stirlingshire (P) | 36 | 20 | 9 | 7 | 80 | 50 | 1.600 | 49 | Promotion to 1963–64 Scottish First Division |
| 3 | Morton | 36 | 23 | 2 | 11 | 100 | 49 | 2.041 | 48 | |
| 4 | Hamilton Academical | 36 | 18 | 8 | 10 | 69 | 56 | 1.232 | 44 | |
| 5 | Stranraer | 36 | 16 | 10 | 10 | 81 | 70 | 1.157 | 42 | |

Source: statto.com
Rules for classification: 1) points; 2) goal ratio.
(C) Champions; (P) Promoted

==== Results by round ====
| Round | 1 | 2 | 3 | 4 | 5 | 6 | 7 | 8 | 9 | 10 | 11 | 12 | 13 | 14 | 15 | 16 | 17 | 18 | 19 | 20 | 21 | 22 | 23 | 24 | 25 | 26 | 27 | 28 | 29 | 30 | 31 | 32 | 33 | 34 | 35 | 36 |
|---|---|---|---|---|---|---|---|---|---|---|---|---|---|---|---|---|---|---|---|---|---|---|---|---|---|---|---|---|---|---|---|---|---|---|---|---|
| Ground | H | A | A | H | H | A | H | A | H | A | H | A | H | H | A | A | H | A | H | H | A | A | A | A | H | A | H | A | H | H | H | A | H | H | A | A |
| Result | W | L | L | W | W | D | W | W | W | W | W | D | D | W | L | L | W | W | W | W | W | D | W | D | W | L | D | D | W | W | W | L | W | D | D | L |
| Position | 9 | 15 | 18 | 16 | 12 | 14 | 11 | 7 | 7 | 3 | 3 | 3 | 2 | 2 | 4 | 5 | 4 | 6 | 5 | 3 | 3 | 4 | 4 | 4 | 3 | 4 | 3 | 3 | 3 | 3 | 2 | 2 | 2 | 2 | 2 | 2 |

Source: statto.com
A = Away; H = Home; W = Win; D = Draw; L = Loss

=== Scottish Cup ===
| 26 January 1963 Round 1 | East Stirlingshire | 2 – 0 | Stirling Albion | Firs Park, Falkirk |
| | , |

| 6 March 1963 Round 2 | East Stirlingshire | 1 – 0 | Motherwell | Firs Park, Falkirk |
| | Goal |

| 20 March 1963 Round 3 | Rangers | 7 – 2 | East Stirlingshire | Ibrox Park, Glasgow |
| | ,,,,,, | | , |

=== Scottish League Cup ===
| 11 August 1962 Group 5 | East Stirlingshire | 4 – 1 | Ayr United | Firs Park, Falkirk |
| | ,,, | | Goal |

| 15 August 1962 Group 5 | Hamilton Academical | 4 – 4 | East Stirlingshire | Douglas Park, Hamilton |
| | ,,, | | ,,, |

| 18 August 1962 Group 5 | East Stirlingshire | 3 – 2 | Berwick Rangers | Firs Park, Falkirk |
| | ,, | | , |

| 25 August 1962 Group 5 | Ayr United | 2 – 1 | East Stirlingshire | Somerset Park, Ayr |
| | , | | Goal |

| 29 August 1962 Group 5 | East Stirlingshire | 0 – 1 | Hamilton Academical | Firs Park, Falkirk |
| | | | Goal |

| 1 September 1962 Group 5 | Berwick Rangers | 2 – 0 | East Stirlingshire | Shielfield Park, Berwick-upon-Tweed |
| | | | , |

==== Group 5 ====
| Team | Pld | W | D | L | GF | GA | GR | Pts |
|---|---|---|---|---|---|---|---|---|
| Berwick Rangers (A) | 6 | 3 | 2 | 1 | 12 | 8 | 1.500 | 8 |
| Ayr United | 6 | 2 | 3 | 1 | 13 | 14 | 0.929 | 7 |
| East Stirlingshire | 6 | 2 | 1 | 3 | 12 | 12 | 1.000 | 5 |
| Hamilton Academical | 6 | 1 | 2 | 3 | 13 | 16 | 0.813 | 4 |

Source: statto.com
(A) Advanced to Supplementary Round

=== Other ===
==== Stirlingshire Cup ====
| 16 October 1962 Round 1 | East Stirlingshire | 2 – 2 | Stirling Albion | Firs Park, Falkirk |
| | , | | , |

| 30 October 1962 Round 1 replay | Stirling Albion | 3 – 3 | East Stirlingshire | Annfield, Stirling |
| | , | | , |

| 20 November 1962 Round 1 replay 2 | Stirling Albion | 3 – 0 | East Stirlingshire |
| | ,, |

== See also ==
- List of East Stirlingshire F.C. seasons
