= McHarg =

McHarg is a surname. Notable people with the surname include:

- Alastair McHarg (born 1944), Scottish rugby union player
- Elizabeth McHarg (1923–1999), Scottish mathematician
- Ian McHarg (1920–2001), Scottish architect
- Marilyn McHarg, member of the Canadian section of Médecins Sans Frontières (MSF)
- Rodger McHarg (born 1947), New Zealand cricket umpire
- Scott McHarg (born 1974), Scottish football player
- Cameron McKenzie-McHarg (born 1980), Australian rower

== Places ==
- McHarg, Michigan, an incorporated community

== See also ==
- Mount McHarg, a mountain in western Canada
- McHargue, a surname
