= Diamond Stadium =

Greyhound racing stadium in Scotland

Diamond Stadium/Brockville Greyhound Stadium
- Interactive map of Diamond Stadium/Brockville Greyhound Stadium
- Location: Grahamston Bridge, Falkirk
- Coordinates: 56°00′09″N 3°46′54″W

Construction
- Opened: 19 August 1932
- Closed: July 1988

Diamond Stadium was a greyhound racing stadium situated in Falkirk, Scotland. It was also known as the Brockville Greyhound Stadium and Falkirk Diamond Stadium and is not to be confused with the nearby Brockville Park.

== Origins ==
The stadium became the third venue in Falkirk to introduce greyhound racing following Firs Park and Brockville Park. The site chosen in 1932 for the newly purpose built track was on the old Springfield Iron Foundry. Falkirk at the time was immersed in iron works with a significant percentage of the population employed in the industry. The name Diamond Stadium was derived from the former Springfield Iron foundry that was locally known as the Diamond Foundry.

== Opening ==
Four thousand people attended the opening night on 19 August 1932 with the first winner being Willie C who won a Kennel sweepstake competition. In a match race on the same night the White City Stadium, Glasgow champion and Scottish Greyhound Derby winner Laverock defeated the Carntyne Stadium champion Man Friday by nineteen lengths. The Diamond Stadium management initially declared their intentions to be independent and race on Saturday afternoons in an attempt to damage the football match day crowds of the other two rival tracks but they soon joined the National Greyhound Racing Club (NGRC) and began a regular race schedule. The competition between the tracks was fierce and it made the Scottish national papers who labelled it as a war. Firs Park reverted to football only in 1933 and Brockville Park followed suit in 1935.

== History ==
The track had long straights and tight bends with distances of 250, 450, 580 & 800 yards around a 320-yard circumference. The stadium was owned by the Brockville Greyhound Racecourse Ltd with racing taking place on Monday, Wednesday and Saturday evenings. The main stand, kennels and paddock were all adjacent to the same Stirlingshire Midland Junction railway that ran below the Brockville Park football ground. The stadium lost its NGRC licence on 22 October 1937 but experienced a totalisator turnover high in 1946 of £218,962; a large sum for an independent track.

The Falkirk council acquired the stadium for £31,000 at the beginning of 1972 following the exit of the previous track owner Mr George Jack. They in turn leased it initially to John O'Donnell and then for a number of years to Falkirk businessman William Barr. William Barr invested much needed funds turning it into a family affair and by 1980 all races were handicaps on an all-sand surface over distances of 215, 535, 730 & 900 yards. There were ten bookmakers and racing took place on Tuesday and Friday nights at 7.30 p.m. Trials were held on a Sunday.

== Closure ==
The track closed in July 1988 and was redeveloped into the Central Retail Park.

== Track records ==
Distance yards	Greyhound	Time	Date
350	Room Boy	21.70	1936
350	Big Sambo	21.70	1936
500	Two Aces	30.60	1936
600	Ma Petite	42.42	1936
