= 1993–94 Scottish Second Division =

Scottish Second Division
- Season: 1993–94
- Champions: Stranraer
- Promoted: Stranraer
- Relegated: Alloa Athletic; Forfar Athletic; East Stirlingshire; Montrose; Queen's Park; Arbroath; Albion Rovers; Cowdenbeath.

The 1993–94 Scottish Second Division was won by Stranraer who were promoted to the First Division.

== Relegation ==
Due to the introduction of a new Scottish Third Division for the 1994–95 season, 8 teams were relegated to create the new league. These were: Alloa Athletic, Forfar Athletic, East Stirlingshire, Montrose, Queen's Park, Arbroath, Albion Rovers and Cowdenbeath.

== Table ==
Pos	Team	Pld	W	D	L	GF	GA	GD	Pts	Promotion or relegation
1	Stranraer (C, P)	39	23	10	6	63	35	+28	56	Promotion to the First Division
2	Berwick Rangers	39	18	12	9	75	46	+29	48	
3	Stenhousemuir	39	19	9	11	62	44	+18	47	
4	Meadowbank Thistle	39	17	13	9	62	48	+14	47	
5	Queen of the South	39	17	9	13	69	48	+21	43	
6	East Fife	39	15	11	13	58	52	+6	41	
7	Alloa Athletic (R)	39	12	17	10	41	39	+2	41	Relegation to the Third Division
8	Forfar Athletic (R)	39	14	11	14	58	58	0	39	Relegation to the Third Division
9	East Stirlingshire (R)	39	13	11	15	54	57	−3	37	Relegation to the Third Division
10	Montrose (R)	39	14	8	17	56	61	−5	36	Relegation to the Third Division
11	Queen's Park (R)	39	12	10	17	52	76	−24	34	Relegation to the Third Division
12	Arbroath (R)	39	12	9	18	42	67	−25	33	Relegation to the Third Division
13	Albion Rovers (R)	39	7	10	22	37	66	−29	24	Relegation to the Third Division
14	Cowdenbeath (R)	39	6	8	25	40	72	−32	20	Relegation to the Third Division

Rules for classification: 1) points; 2) goal difference; 3) number of goals scored.
(C) Champions; (P) Promoted; (R) Relegated
