= Tom Currie (footballer) =

Scottish footballer

Personal information
- Full name: Thomas Andrew Currie
- Date of birth: 6 November 1970 (age 55)
- Place of birth: Alexandria, Scotland
- Position: Centre back

Youth career
- Kilpatrick Juveniles

Senior career*
Years	Team	Apps	(Gls)
1991–1998	Clydebank	120	(4)
1997–1999	Dumbarton	15	(0)
- Kilwinning Rangers
- * Club domestic league appearances and goals

Thomas Andrew Currie (born 6 November 1970) is a Scottish former footballer who played as a defender for Clydebank and Dumbarton.

He later played in the Junior grade of Scottish football, winning the West Region Super League in 2003–04 with Kilwinning Rangers.
