= 1997–98 Scottish Third Division =

Scottish Third Division
- Season: 1997–98
- Champions: Alloa Athletic
- Promoted: Alloa Athletic; Arbroath
- Relegated: n/a
- Matches: 180
- Goals: 543 (3.02 per match)
- Biggest home win: Ross County 8–1 Montrose (22 November 1997)
- Biggest away win: Cowdenbeath 0–4 Arbroath (18 October 1997); Queen's Park 0–4 Cowdenbeath (31 January 1998); Queen's Park 0–4 Ross County (2 May 1998)
- Highest scoring: (9 goals); Ross County 8–1 Montrose (22 November 1997)
- Longest winning run: 6 games Cowdenbeath
- Longest unbeaten run: 9 games Alloa Athletic
- Longest winless run: 13 games Berwick Rangers
- Longest losing run: 6 games Albion Rovers; Cowdenbeath

The 1997–98 Scottish Football League Third Division was the 4th season in the format of ten teams in the fourth-tier of Scottish football since it was re-established in 1994–95. The season started on 5 August 1997 and ended on 9 May 1998. Alloa Athletic finished top and were promoted alongside runners-up Arbroath. Dumbarton finished bottom.

== Teams for 1997–98 ==
Location of teams in 1997–98 Scottish Third Division

Inverness Caledonian Thistle as champions of the previous season were directly promoted to the 1997–98 Scottish Second Division alongside runners-up Forfar Athletic. They were replaced by Dumbarton and Berwick Rangers who finished second bottom and bottom of the 1996–97 Scottish Second Division respectively.

=== Overview ===
Relegated from Second Division to the Third Division

- Dumbarton
- Berwick Rangers

Promoted from Third Division to the Second Division

- Inverness Caledonian Thistle
- Forfar Athletic

== Stadia and locations ==
Team	Location	Stadium
Albion Rovers	Coatbridge	Cliftonhill
Alloa Athletic	Alloa	Recreation Park
Arbroath	Arbroath	Gayfield Park
Berwick Rangers	Berwick-upon-Tweed	Shielfield Park
Cowdenbeath	Cowdenbeath	Central Park
Dumbarton	Dumbarton	Boghead Park
East Stirlingshire	Falkirk	Firs Park
Montrose	Montrose	Links Park
Queen's Park	Glasgow	Hampden Park
Ross County	Dingwall	Victoria Park

== Table ==
Pos	Team	Pld	W	D	L	GF	GA	GD	Pts	Promotion
1	Alloa Athletic (C, P)	36	24	4	8	78	39	+39	76	Promotion to the Second Division
2	Arbroath (P)	36	20	8	8	67	39	+28	68	Promotion to the Second Division
3	Ross County	36	19	10	7	71	36	+35	67	
4	East Stirlingshire	36	17	6	13	50	48	+2	57	
5	Albion Rovers	36	13	5	18	60	73	−13	44	
6	Berwick Rangers	36	10	12	14	47	55	−8	42	
7	Queen's Park	36	10	11	15	42	55	−13	41	
8	Cowdenbeath	36	12	2	22	33	57	−24	38	
9	Montrose	36	10	8	18	53	80	−27	38	
10	Dumbarton	36	7	10	19	42	61	−19	31	

Source: Soccerway
Rules for classification: 1) points; 2) goal difference; 3) number of goals scored.
(C) Champions; (P) Promoted

== Statistics ==
=== Top scorers ===
Pos	Player	Club	Goals
1	(Scotland) Colin McGlashan	Montrose	20
2	(Scotland) Willie Irvine	Alloa Athletic	18
3	(Scotland) Billy Spence	Arbroath	16
4	(Scotland) Derek Adams	Ross County	15
5	(Scotland) Willie Watters	Albion Rovers	13
5	(Scotland) Davie Watt	East Stirlingshire	13
7	(Scotland) Paul Forrester	Berwick Rangers	10
7	(Scotland) Lee Gardner	Albion Rovers	10
7	(Scotland) Brian Grant	Arbroath	10
7	(Scotland) Colin McKinnon	Dumbarton	10
