= McHargue =

McHargue is a surname. Notable people with the surname include:

- Darrel McHargue (born 1954), American jockey
- Georgess McHargue (1941–2011), American writer and poet
- Keegan McHargue (born 1982), American artist
- Rosy McHargue (1902–1999), American jazz musician

== See also ==
- McHarg (surname)
