= 1994–95 Scottish Third Division =

Scottish Third Division
- Season: 1994–95
- Champions: Forfar Athletic
- Promoted: Forfar Athletic; Montrose
- Relegated: n/a
- Matches: 180
- Goals: 526 (2.92 per match)
- Biggest home win: Ross County 6–0 Alloa Athletic (11 February 1995)
- Biggest away win: Five games by 4 goals^{[A]}
- Highest scoring: Cowdenbeath 6–2 Arbroath (20 August 1994)
- Longest winning run: 7 games Arbroath; Forfar Athletic; Ross County
- Longest unbeaten run: 11 games Forfar Athletic; Montrose
- Longest winless run: 10 games Albion Rovers; Queen's Park
- Longest losing run: 9 games Cowdenbeath

The 1994–95 Scottish Football League Third Division was the 1st season of the league since its demise at the end of the 1954–55 season. The league was created from the bottom 8 clubs of the 1993–94 Second Division plus two new entrants from the Highland Football League, Caledonian Thistle of Inverness and Ross County from Dingwall. The season started on 12 August 1994 and ended on 12 May 1995. Forfar Athletic finished top and were promoted alongside runners-up Montrose. Albion Rovers finished bottom.

== Teams for 1994–95 ==
Location of teams in 1994–95 Scottish Third Division

The bottom eight clubs from the 1993–94 Second Division were moved and effectively relegated to create the new Third Division. The teams were Alloa Athletic, Forfar Athletic, East Stirlingshire, Montrose, Queen's Park, Arbroath, Albion Rovers and Cowdenbeath. Two new clubs were admitted to the Scottish Football League from the Highland Football League in the form of Caledonian Thistle and Ross County to complete the 10 teams.

=== Overview ===
Relegated from Second Division to create the new Third Division

- Alloa Athletic
- Forfar Athletic
- East Stirlingshire
- Montrose
- Queen's Park
- Arbroath
- Albion Rovers
- Cowdenbeath

Newly admitted to the Third Division from the Highland Football League

- Caledonian Thistle
- Ross County

== Stadia and locations ==
Team	Location	Stadium
Albion Rovers	Coatbridge	Cliftonhill
Alloa Athletic	Alloa	Recreation Park
Arbroath	Arbroath	Gayfield Park
Caledonian Thistle	Inverness	Telford Street Park
Cowdenbeath	Cowdenbeath	Central Park
East Stirlingshire	Falkirk	Firs Park
Forfar Athletic	Forfar	Station Park
Montrose	Montrose	Links Park
Queen's Park	Glasgow	Hampden Park
Ross County	Dingwall	Victoria Park

== Table ==
Pos	Team	Pld	W	D	L	GF	GA	GD	Pts	Promotion
1	Forfar Athletic (C, P)	36	25	5	6	67	33	+34	80	Promotion to the Second Division
2	Montrose (P)	36	20	7	9	69	32	+37	67	Promotion to the Second Division
3	Ross County	36	18	6	12	59	44	+15	60	
4	East Stirlingshire	36	18	5	13	61	50	+11	59	
5	Alloa Athletic	36	15	9	12	50	45	+5	54	
6	Caledonian Thistle	36	12	9	15	48	61	−13	45	
7	Arbroath	36	13	5	18	51	62	−11	44	
8	Queen's Park	36	12	6	18	46	57	−11	42	
9	Cowdenbeath	36	11	7	18	48	60	−12	40	
10	Albion Rovers	36	5	3	28	27	82	−55	18	

Source: Soccerway
Rules for classification: 1) points; 2) goal difference; 3) number of goals scored.
(C) Champions; (P) Promoted

== Notes ==
- A. Albion Rovers 0–4 Alloa Athletic (13 August 1994); Caledonian Thistle 0–4 Queen's Park (20 August 1994); Queen's Park 0–4 Arbroath (19 November 1994); Caledonian Thistle 0–4 Montrose (14 February 1995); Cowdenbeath 0–4 Montrose (6 May 1995).
