= 1998–99 Scottish Third Division =

Irn-Bru Scottish Third Division
- Season: 1998–99
- Champions: Ross County
- Promoted: Ross County; Stenhousemuir

The 1998–99 Scottish Third Division was won by Ross County who, along with second placed Stenhousemuir, gained promotion to the Second Division. Montrose finished bottom.

Location of teams in 1997–98 Scottish Third Division

== Table ==
Pos	Team	Pld	W	D	L	GF	GA	GD	Pts	Promotion
1	Ross County (C, P)	36	24	5	7	87	42	+45	77	Promotion to the Second Division
2	Stenhousemuir (P)	36	19	7	10	62	42	+20	64	Promotion to the Second Division
3	Brechin City	36	17	7	12	47	44	+3	58	
4	Dumbarton	36	16	9	11	53	40	+13	57	
5	Berwick Rangers	36	12	14	10	53	49	+4	50	
6	Queen's Park	36	11	11	14	41	46	−5	44	
7	Albion Rovers	36	12	8	16	43	63	−20	44	
8	East Stirlingshire	36	9	13	14	50	48	+2	40	
9	Cowdenbeath	36	9	6	21	35	65	−30	33	
10	Montrose	36	8	6	22	42	74	−32	30	

Source: "1998-1999 Third Division - SPFL Archive". SPFL.
Rules for classification: 1) points; 2) goal difference; 3) number of goals scored.
(C) Champions; (P) Promoted
