= John Bradford (footballer) =

Scottish footballer

Personal information
- Date of birth: 15 December 1979 (age 46)
- Place of birth: Irvine, Scotland
- Position: Forward

Youth career
- Whitletts Victoria

Senior career*
Years	Team	Apps	(Gls)
1997–2002	Ayr United	45	(5)
1998–2000	→ Dumbarton (loan)	10	(5)
1999–2000	→ Stenhousemuir (loan)	13	(0)
2000–2001	→ Stranraer (loan)	3	(1)
2000–2005	Albion Rovers	80	(19)
2005–2006	East Fife	31	(7)
- * Club domestic league appearances and goals

John Bradford (born 15 December 1979) is a Scottish former footballer who played for Ayr United, Dumbarton, Stenhousemuir, Stranraer, Albion Rovers and East Fife.
