= 1998–99 Dunfermline Athletic F.C. season =

Dunfermline Athletic
1998–99 season
- Manager: Bert Paton (until 5 January); Dick Campbell (from 5 January)
- Stadium: East End Park
- Scottish Premier League: Tenth Place
- Scottish Cup: Fourth round
- Scottish League Cup: Second round
- Top goalscorer: League: Andy Smith (8); All: Andy Smith (10)
Home colours

The 1998–99 season saw Dunfermline Athletic compete in the Scottish Premier League where they finished in 10th position with 28 points, suffering relegation to the 1999–2000 Scottish First Division.

== Results ==
Dunfermline Athletic's score comes first

=== Legend ===
Win	Draw	Loss

=== Scottish Premier League ===
Match	Date	Opponent	Venue	Result	Attendance	Scorers
1	1 August 1998	Celtic	A	0–5	59,220	
2	15 August 1998	Dundee	H	2–0	5,308	Smith 45', Shaw 46'
3	22 August 1998	Motherwell	A	0–0	9,858	
4	29 August 1998	Aberdeen	H	1–1	6,463	French 88'
5	12 September 1998	St Johnstone	A	1–1	5,997	Smith 49'
6	20 September 1998	Heart of Midlothian	H	1–1	5,963	Smith 12'
7	23 September 1998	Dundee United	A	1–1	6,449	Squires 40'
8	26 September 1998	Rangers	H	0–2	11,507	
9	3 October 1998	Kilmarnock	A	0–0	8,346	
10	17 October 1998	Celtic	H	2–2	10,968	Britton 13', French 27'
11	28 October 1998	Dundee	A	0–1	4,619	
12	31 October 1998	St Johnstone	H	1–1	5,911	Smith 22'
13	7 November 1998	Aberdeen	A	1–2	10,293	Squires 81'
14	15 November 1998	Dundee United	H	2–1	10,704	Tod 26', McCulloch 35'
15	21 November 1998	Heart of Midlothian	A	1–2	13,268	Edinho 18'
16	28 November 1998	Kilmarnock	H	0–3	5,608	
17	5 December 1998	Rangers	A	1–1	47,465	Petrie 76'
18	12 December 1998	Motherwell	H	1–1	5,182	Smith 79'
19	19 December 1998	Celtic	A	0–5	59,024	
20	26 December 1998	Aberdeen	H	1–2	7,873	Shaw 53'
21	29 December 1998	St Johnstone	A	1–1	6,070	Smith 68'
22	2 January 1999	Heart of Midlothian	H	0–0	9,227	
23	30 January 1999	Dundee United	A	1–1	7,646	Smith 46'
24	7 February 1999	Rangers	H	0–3	11,500	
25	27 February 1999	Motherwell	A	1–1	6,094	Britton 86'
26	6 March 1999	Kilmarnock	A	0–0	8,032	
27	13 March 1999	Dundee	H	2–1	6,890	Thomson 63', Graham 89'
28	20 March 1999	St Johnstone	H	1–0	5,504	Petrie 61'
29	3 April 1999	Aberdeen	A	1–3	11,371	Graham 7'
30	14 April 1999	Rangers	A	0–1	46,220	
31	17 April 1999	Kilmarnock	H	0–6	5,617	
32	24 April 1999	Dundee United	H	2–2	6,190	Millar 46', Smith 54'
33	3 May 1999	Heart of Midlothian	A	0–2	15,176	
34	8 May 1999	Celtic	H	1–2	8,809	Coyle 83'
35	15 May 1999	Dundee	A	1–3	4,176	Thomson 49'
36	23 May 1999	Motherwell	H	1–2	3,532	Boyle 20'

=== Scottish League Cup ===
Match	Date	Opponent	Venue	Result	Attendance	Scorers
R2	8 August 1998	Livingston	A	0–1	3,038	

=== Scottish Cup ===
Match	Date	Opponent	Venue	Result	Attendance	Scorers
R3	23 January 1999	Partick Thistle	A	2–1	4,650	Smith 17', 32'
R4	13 February 1999	Celtic	A	0–4	47,194	

== League table ==
Pos	Team	Pld	W	D	L	GF	GA	GD	Pts	Qualification or relegation
6	Heart of Midlothian	36	11	9	16	44	50	−6	42	
7	Motherwell	36	10	11	15	35	54	−19	41	
8	Aberdeen	36	10	7	19	43	71	−28	37	
9	Dundee United	36	8	10	18	37	48	−11	34	
10	Dunfermline Athletic (R)	36	4	16	16	28	59	−31	28	Relegation to the 1999–2000 Scottish First Division

Updated to match(es) played on end of season. Source: Soccerway and SPL official website
Rules for classification: 1) Points; 2) Goal difference; 3) Goals scored
(R) Relegated
