= John McCormack (footballer, born 1965) =

Scottish footballer

Personal information
- Full name: John Thomas McCormack
- Date of birth: 22 July 1965 (age 61)
- Place of birth: Stirling, Scotland
- Positions: Defender; midfielder

Youth career
- 1979-1981: Stirling Boys Club
- 1982-1983: Bonnybridge Juniors

Senior career*
Years	Team	Apps	(Gls)
1982–1988	Falkirk	66	(2)
1987–1991	Meadowbank Thistle	68	(1)
1991–1994	Stirling Albion	48	(0)
1993–1999	Alloa Athletic	100	(2)
1999–2000	Dumbarton	18	(0)
- * Club domestic league appearances and goals

John Thomas McCormack (born 22 July 1965) is a Scottish former footballer who played for Falkirk, Meadowbank Thistle, Stirling Albion, Alloa Athletic and Dumbarton.
