= 2000–01 Scottish Third Division =

Scottish Third Division
- Season: 2000–01
- Champions: Hamilton Academical
- Promoted: Hamilton Academical; Cowdenbeath
- Matches played: 180

The 2000–01 Scottish Third Division was won by Hamilton Academical who, along with second placed Cowdenbeath, gained promotion to the Second Division. This was the first season in the league for Elgin City and Peterhead; Elgin finished bottom.

Location of teams in 1999–2000 Scottish Third Division

== Table ==
Pos	Team	Pld	W	D	L	GF	GA	GD	Pts	Promotion
1	Hamilton Academical (C, P)	36	22	10	4	75	41	+34	76	Promotion to the Second Division
2	Cowdenbeath (P)	36	23	7	6	58	31	+27	76	Promotion to the Second Division
3	Brechin City	36	22	6	8	71	36	+35	72	
4	East Fife	36	15	8	13	49	46	+3	53	
5	Peterhead	36	13	10	13	46	46	0	49	
6	Dumbarton	36	13	6	17	46	49	−3	45	
7	Albion Rovers	36	12	9	15	38	43	−5	45	
8	East Stirlingshire	36	10	7	19	37	69	−32	37	
9	Montrose	36	6	8	22	31	65	−34	26	
10	Elgin City	36	5	7	24	29	65	−36	22	

Source: "2000-2001 Third Division - SPFL Archive". SPFL (in Malay).
Rules for classification: 1) points; 2) goal difference; 3) number of goals scored.
(C) Champions; (P) Promoted
