= Billy Melvin =

Scottish footballer

Personal information
- Full name: William John Melvin
- Date of birth: 22 June 1977 (age 49)
- Place of birth: Glasgow, Scotland
- Position: Midfielder

Youth career
- Shettleston

Senior career*
Years	Team	Apps	(Gls)
1995–1998	Clydebank	18	(0)
1997–2000	Dumbarton	47	(5)
- * Club domestic league appearances and goals

William John Melvin (born 22 June 1977) is a Scottish former footballer who played for Clydebank and Dumbarton.
