= Alex Grace =

Scottish footballer

Personal information
- Full name: Alexander Grace
- Date of birth: 20 March 1974 (age 52)
- Place of birth: Vale of Leven, Scotland
- Position: Midfielder

Senior career*
Years	Team	Apps	(Gls)
1993–1994	Morton	3	(0)
1997–2001	Dumbarton	89	(8)
2000–2003	Stranraer	38	(2)
- * Club domestic league appearances and goals

Alexander Grace (born 20 March 1974) is a Scottish former footballer who played for Morton, Dumbarton and Stranraer.
