= 1948–49 Scottish Division B =

Scottish Division B
- Season: 1948–49
- Champions: Raith Rovers
- Promoted: Raith Rovers; Stirling Albion

The 1948–49 Scottish Division B was won by Raith Rovers F.C. who along with second placed Stirling Albion, were promoted to Division A. East Stirlingshire finished bottom.

== Table ==
Pos	Team	Pld	W	D	L	GF	GA	GD	Pts	Promotion or relegation
1	Raith Rovers	30	20	2	8	80	44	+36	42	Promotion to the 1949–50 Division A
2	Stirling Albion	30	20	2	8	71	47	+24	42	Promotion to the 1949–50 Division A
3	Airdrieonians	30	16	9	5	76	42	+34	41	
4	Dunfermline Athletic	30	16	9	5	80	58	+22	41	
5	Queen's Park	30	14	7	9	66	49	+17	35	
6	St Johnstone	30	14	4	12	58	51	+7	32	
7	Arbroath	30	12	8	10	62	56	+6	32	
8	Dundee United	30	10	7	13	60	67	−7	27	
9	Ayr United	30	10	7	13	51	70	−19	27	
10	Hamilton Academical	30	9	8	13	48	57	−9	26	
11	Kilmarnock	30	9	7	14	58	61	−3	25	
12	Stenhousemuir	30	8	8	14	50	54	−4	24	
13	Cowdenbeath	30	9	5	16	53	58	−5	23	
14	Alloa Athletic	30	10	3	17	42	85	−43	23	
15	Dumbarton	30	8	6	16	52	79	−27	22	
16	East Stirlingshire	30	6	6	18	38	67	−29	18	Relegated to the 1949–50 Division C South East Section

Source: "1948-1949 Division B - SPFL Archive". SPFL.
