= 1999–2000 Scottish Third Division =

Scottish Third Division
- Season: 1999–00
- Champions: Queen's Park
- Promoted: Queen's Park; Berwick Rangers; Forfar Athletic
- Matches played: 180

The 1999–2000 Scottish Third Division was won by Queen's Park who, along with second and third placed Berwick Rangers and Forfar Athletic, gained promotion to the Second Division. Albion Rovers finished bottom.

Location of teams in 1999–2000 Scottish Third Division

== Table ==
Pos	Team	Pld	W	D	L	GF	GA	GD	Pts	Promotion
1	Queen's Park (C, P)	36	20	9	7	54	37	+17	69	Promotion to the Second Division
2	Berwick Rangers (P)	36	19	9	8	53	30	+23	66	Promotion to the Second Division
3	Forfar Athletic (P)	36	17	10	9	64	40	+24	61	Promotion to the Second Division
4	East Fife	36	17	8	11	45	39	+6	59	
5	Cowdenbeath	36	15	9	12	59	43	+16	54	
6	Dumbarton	36	15	8	13	53	51	+2	53	
7	East Stirlingshire	36	11	7	18	28	50	−22	40	
8	Brechin City	36	10	8	18	42	51	−9	38	
9	Montrose	36	10	7	19	39	54	−15	37	
10	Albion Rovers	36	5	7	24	33	75	−42	22	

Source: "1999-2000 Third Division - SPFL Archive". SPFL (in Malay).
Rules for classification: 1) points; 2) goal difference; 3) number of goals scored.
(C) Champions; (P) Promoted
