= Willie Wilson (footballer, born 1972) =

Scottish footballer

Personal information
- Full name: William Stewart Wilson
- Date of birth: 19 August 1972 (age 54)
- Place of birth: Glasgow, Scotland
- Position: Midfielder

Youth career
- Kirkintilloch Rob Roy

Senior career*
Years	Team	Apps	(Gls)
1995–1997	Ayr United	10	(1)
1996–1999	Dumbarton	88	(6)
1999–2000	Cowdenbeath	36	(1)
2000–2001	Dumbarton	11	(0)
2000–2002	East Fife	50	(2)
2002–2005	Airdrie United	66	(0)
2005-2007	Elgin City		
2010-2011	Bathgate Thistle		
- * Club domestic league appearances and goals

William Stewart Wilson (born 19 August 1972) is a Scottish retired footballer who played for Ayr United, Dumbarton, Cowdenbeath, East Fife and Airdrie United.
