= Scott McHarg =

Scottish footballer

Personal information
- Full name: Scott McHarg
- Date of birth: 16 June 1974 (age 52)
- Place of birth: Glasgow, Scotland
- Height: 5 ft 10 in (1.78 m)
- Position: Winger

Youth career
- Maryhill

Senior career*
Years	Team	Apps	(Gls)
1998–1999	Clyde	16	(2)
1999	Partick Thistle	2	(0)
1999	Blantyre Victoria		
1999–2000	Dumbarton	7	(0)
2000	Shotts Bon Accord		
- Blantyre Vics
- Johnstone Burgh
- Hurlford United
- Petershill
Total		25	(2)
- * Club domestic league appearances and goals

Scott McHarg (born 16 June 1974) is a Scottish former professional footballer.

== Career ==
In the summer of 1998, McHarg was part of the Junior revolution which swept through Clyde, being one of eleven players coming from the junior ranks to join the Bully Wee. He stayed for 8 months at Clyde, before joining Partick Thistle in February 1999. He went on to play for Dumbarton, before returning to the juniors to sign for Shotts Bon Accord. Scott then signed for Petershill Juniors and thereafter coached the team following his retirement due to knee problems.

McHarg coaches young people throughout Glasgow in his role with coaching and groupwork company A&M Training.
