= Brockville Park =

Former football stadium in Falkirk, Scotland

- Location within Falkirk
- Location: Hope Street, Falkirk
- Coordinates: 56°00′12.39″N 3°47′21.50″W
- Capacity: 7,500 – 8,000
- Surface: Grass
- Record attendance: 23,100 v Celtic; 21 February 1953

Construction
- Opened: 1885
- Closed: 2003
- Demolished: 2003

Tenants
- Falkirk F.C. (1885–2003)

Brockville Park was a football stadium located on Hope Street in Falkirk, Scotland, 0.25 miles (0.4 km) north-west of the town centre. It was the home of Falkirk F.C. from 1885 until the end of 2002–03 Scottish football season. The record attendance at Brockville Park was 23,100 on 21 February 1953 in a match against Celtic. The stadium has since been replaced with a Morrisons supermarket. An old turnstile is on display next to the supermarket's car park.

== Layout ==
The main stand was situated to the West of the pitch and was mostly for home supporters and directors, with a small section in the North West end allocated to away fans. The Cooperage Lane terracing was to the South of the pitch and was for home supporters. The Watson Street terracing was to the North East of the pitch and was for away fans. Away fans also used terracing on James Street at the North end. Part of the James Street end was closed in latter years as it failed to gain a safety certificate. The Hope Street end on the East side was for home fans, where it merged into Watson Street, separated by a metal 'cage'.

== Controversy ==
=== SPL criteria ===
Falkirk were denied promotion to the Scottish Premier League on several occasions due to regulations and criteria which Brockville Park did not meet. The most recent was in the 2002–03 season when Falkirk, despite winning the First Division, were refused entry to the SPL. In preparation for winning the First Division that season, and the prospect of promotion, Falkirk started talks with several clubs over a ground-sharing partnership for the 2003–04 season. However, the SPL criteria stated at the time that ground-sharing was prohibited for clubs in the Premier League so Falkirk remained in the First Division and tried to make a ground-share agreement whilst Brockville Park was demolished. Two potential partners were Airdrie United with their Excelsior Stadium and Clyde with their ground of Broadwood Stadium in nearby Cumbernauld, a third option was to share Ochilview Park with local rivals Stenhousemuir and eventually an agreement was made for Falkirk to play their home games at Ochilview for one season.

=== Poor facilities ===
In 2001, when Recreation Park, the home of Alloa Athletic was deemed unsuitable by police to host a match against Celtic due to its small capacity, Brockville Park was chosen as the venue for the Scottish Cup third-round tie. This was met with criticism from both clubs over the Scottish Football Association and their decision because the ground lacked under-soil heating, which was significant because the match was scheduled to be played in January at the height of winter. Another argument was that a previous match between Alloa and Celtic was relocated to Partick Thistle's Firhill Stadium in Glasgow, which is an all-seater stadium. Alloa Athletic's manager at the time, Terry Christie, had shown confusion to why the Scottish Cup tie was not also hosted at a similar venue, rather than Falkirk's Brockville Park, which contained terracing and was not an all-seater stadium.

== Closure ==
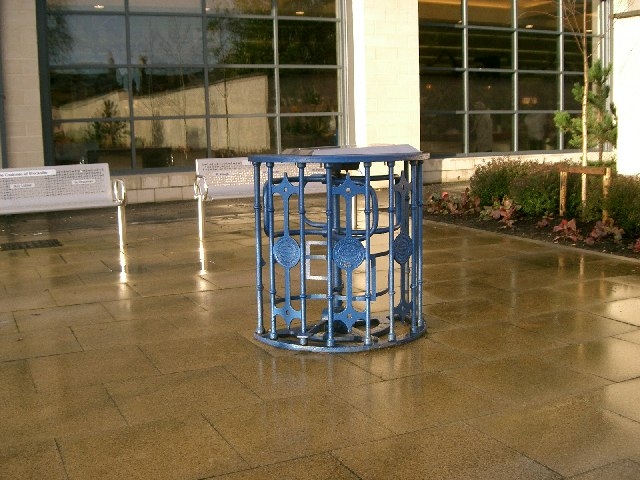
An old turnstile outside the supermarket

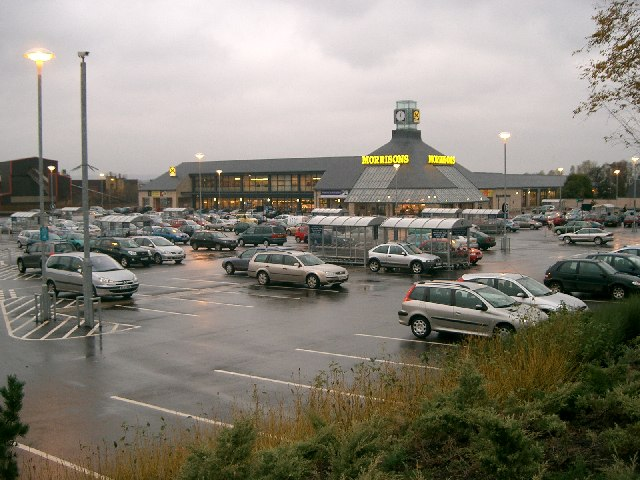
Morrisons supermarket on the site of the former stadium

Brockville Park was demolished towards the end of 2003, having remained largely unchanged for decades, and was considered unsafe to host matches in the Scottish Premier League due to its largely terraced spectator areas. The site was then sold to supermarket chain Morrisons who built a new branch in place of Brockville Park. The supermarket contains memorabilia commemorating Falkirk's history at Brockville Park. An old turnstile from the stadium is located just outside the supermarket. The club ground-shared with local rivals Stenhousemuir at Ochilview Park for the 2003–04 football season whilst their new home, the Falkirk Stadium was being constructed. In 2004 Falkirk moved to their newly built stadium on the outskirts of the town.

== Greyhound racing ==
Brockville Park became the second of three greyhound racing venues in Falkirk; the first was Firs Park. Racing took place from 16 July 1932 until 15 May 1935. The racing ended due to competition from the nearby new custom built Diamond Stadium/Brockville Greyhound Racecourse.

It cost an estimated £10,000 to build the greyhound track around the football pitch in 1932 and the management joined the British Greyhound Tracks Control Society (BGTCS), an organisation formed to assist tracks wishing to race under regulations and a rival to the bigger National Greyhound Racing Club (NGRC). The Brockville Park management led by Racing Manager Captain John Hill O.B.E (also a qualified vet) had purchased the greyhounds from the Crewe sales one week before the opening night. A six race card with tote betting only, formed the first meeting but that would be increased to eight races at a later date. The runners were cared for by former Firs Park trainer William Hay who would take over from Captain Hill the following year. The biggest event held at the track was called the Falkirk Greyhound Derby and racing sometimes took place immediately after football matches. The hope that the racing would ease the financial problems of Falkirk FC never materialised. The track at some stage after 1935 gained a licence with the NGRC, the licence was withdrawn on 22 October 1937.

== See also ==
- Stadium relocations in Scottish football
