= Scottish Football League Third Division =

- Founded: 1994
- Folded: 2013
- Country: Scotland^{[note 1]}
- Number of clubs: 10
- Level on pyramid: 4
- Promotion to: Scottish Second Division
- Domestic cup(s): Scottish Cup; League Cup; Challenge Cup
- Last champions: Rangers

The Scottish Football League Third Division was the fourth tier of the Scottish football league system between 1994 and 2013.

== History ==
The Scottish football league system had operated with three divisions in the Scottish Football League (SFL) from 1975. In 1994, as part of reconstruction to allow the admission of Inverness Caledonian Thistle and Ross County to the league, the SFL was recalibrated to give four divisions of 10 teams. The fourth tier was named the Third Division.

In 1998, the Premier Division (top flight) clubs broke away to form the Scottish Premier League (SPL). The Third Division continued as the fourth tier of the league system, but was now the third tier of the SFL. In 2013, the SFL and SPL merged to form the Scottish Professional Football League (SPFL). The SPFL named its fourth tier as Scottish League Two, which effectively replaced the Third Division.

== Competition ==
The Third Division consisted of ten teams throughout its existence. From 1994 until 2005, each season the top two teams were promoted to the Second Division. From 2005 until 2013, only the champion was automatically promoted to the Second Division at the end of each season. The clubs that finished 2nd, 3rd and 4th entered a play-off with the 9th placed team of the Second Division.

There was no relegation from the Third Division.

The teams played each other four times with three points for a victory, one point for a draw and zero points for a loss.

== Winners of the Third Division ==
Season	Winner	Runner-up
1994–95	Forfar Athletic	Montrose
1995–96	Livingston	Brechin City
1996–97	Inverness Caledonian Thistle	Forfar Athletic
1997–98	Alloa Athletic	Arbroath
1998–99	Ross County	Stenhousemuir
1999–2000	Queen's Park	Berwick Rangers
2000–01	Hamilton Academical	Cowdenbeath
2001–02	Brechin City	Dumbarton
2002–03	Greenock Morton	East Fife
2003–04	Stranraer	Stirling Albion
2004–05	Gretna	Peterhead
2005–06	Cowdenbeath	Berwick Rangers^{[b]}
2006–07	Berwick Rangers	Arbroath^{[b]}
2007–08	East Fife	Stranraer^{[b]}
2008–09	Dumbarton	Cowdenbeath
2009–10	Livingston (2)	Forfar Athletic
2010–11	Arbroath	Albion Rovers
2011–12	Alloa Athletic (2)	Queen's Park^{[b]}
2012–13	Rangers	Peterhead^{[b]}

b.Team failed to gain promotion via play-offs

== Notes ==
- 1. Every competitor in the league is a member of the Scottish Football League and Scottish Football Association. However, one club – Berwick Rangers – is based in England.
