= Merchiston Park =

Former football ground in Falkirk, Scotland

- Location in Bainsford, Falkirk
- Location: nr. Main Street, Bainsford, Stirlingshire, Scotland
- Coordinates: 56°0′40″N 3°47′15″W
- Owner: East Stirlingshire F.C.

Construction
- Opened: c. 1882
- Closed: 1920

Tenant
- East Stirlingshire F.C. (c. 1882–1920)

Merchiston Park (/ˈmɛərkɪstən/) was a football ground in Bainsford, near Falkirk, which was the home of East Stirlingshire F.C. between c. 1882 and 1920. It was near Main Street, just north of the Forth and Clyde Canal at Bainsford Bridge.

== History ==
=== Early years ===
East Stirlingshire F.C. was formed in 1880 when a group of friends from a cricket team called Bainsford Blue Bonnets formed a football team under the name Britannia. At the end of the club's first year of existence it found a home at Randyford Park in the east of Falkirk. At the time, the ground's previous tenant was a cricket team called East Stirlingshire Cricket Club and in 1881, Britannia also adopted the East Stirlingshire name, which stands to this day.

By 1882, East Stirlingshire is recorded as having played home games at Merchiston Park in Bainsford. The ground was located just west of Main Street and north of the Forth and Clyde Canal at Bainsford Bridge. One of the first matches at the ground under the East Stirlingshire name was against neighbours Falkirk F.C. and ended in a 4–0 defeat for the home side.

The club was admitted to the second tier of the Scottish Football League in 1900 and played its first ever league game at Merchiston Park in August of the same year. The match was against Airdrieonians, in front of a crowd of 2,500 people, and ended in a 3–2 defeat.

In 1908, the whole ground was moved a few hundred metres south to make way for a new railway line, the Bainsford Branch, which bypassed Falkirk Grahamston railway station to the north. The line no longer exists and now forms the route of the A9 Falkirk Ring Road.

=== Move to Firs Park ===
The ground was closed completely in 1920 when the adjacent Burnbank Iron Foundry acquired the Merchiston Park grounds for expansion. The club then moved south of the canal to Firs Street in Falkirk, where Firs Park was located. It remained the club's home for 87 years, until 2008, when it was vacated due to the prohibitive cost of expanding the venue. East Stirlingshire now plays its home games at Ochilview Park, the home of neighbours Stenhousemuir F.C. in a groundshare agreement.

In 2012, East Stirlingshire opened a club shop in Bainsford, near to the former location of Merchiston Park, with the aim of recognising the club's historical roots.
