= Bainsford =

Coordinates: 56.011944°N 03.786668°W

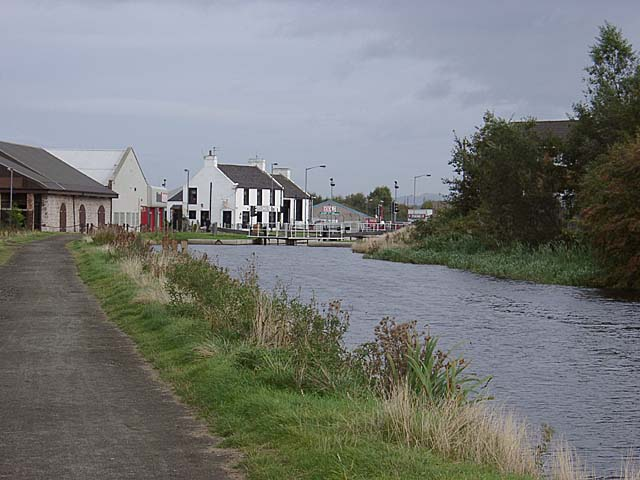
- The Forth and Clyde Canal at Bainsford Bridge Lock

- Location within the Falkirk council area
- Population: 3,202 (2009 estimate)
- OS grid reference: NS883819
  - Edinburgh: 24 mi (39 km) ESE
  - London: 346 mi (557 km) SSE
- Civil parish: Falkirk
- Council area: Falkirk
- Lieutenancy area: Stirling and Falkirk
- Country: Scotland
- Sovereign state: United Kingdom
- Post town: FALKIRK
- Postcode district: FK2
- Dialling code: 01324
- Police: Scotland
- Fire: Scottish
- Ambulance: Scottish
- UK Parliament: Falkirk
- Scottish Parliament: Falkirk West
- Website: falkirk.gov.uk

Bainsford is a small village within the Falkirk council area of Scotland. The village is situated in the Forth Valley, 1 mile (1.6 km) north of the town of Falkirk. It is positioned between the River Carron and the Forth and Clyde Canal to the north and south respectively.

The main road through the village is the B902 road which connects the village with Carron and Falkirk. Bainsford has a population of just over 3,000 residents according to a 2009 estimate.

== History ==
The bridge crossing the Forth and Clyde Canal at Bainsford was originally a bascule bridge. In 1905, the bascule bridge was replaced by a heavier swing bridge to accommodate the new tramway. This in turn was replaced by a non-opening road bridge. Originally a separate village, Bainsford has now become part of the town of Falkirk.

== Sports ==
In 1880 Bainsford Bluebonnets cricket club founded a football team called 'Bainsford Britannia' but changed their name to East Stirlingshire F.C. in 1881, which has remained ever since. The team played their home games at Merchiston Park, Bainsford. The team played their home games at Firs Park in Falkirk before ground sharing with Stenhousemuir F.C. at Ochilview Park after leaving their old stadium in 2008. At the start of the 2018/19 season they switched to using the Falkirk Stadium

Bainsford also was home such local sports heroes such as boxer Dearn Savage and rugby player Robert Spencer.

== See also ==
- List of places in Falkirk council area
