= Old Ralston Park =

Former football ground in Paisley, Scotland

- Location within Renfrewshire
- Location: Paisley, Scotland
- Coordinates: 55.8454°N 4.4015°W
- Surface: Grass
- Record attendance: 5,000

Construction
- Opened: 1899
- Closed: 1909

Tenant
- Abercorn (1889–1909)

Old Ralston Park was a football ground in Paisley, Scotland. It was the home ground of Abercorn during their second decade in the Scottish Football League.

== History ==
Abercorn moved to the ground in 1899 from Underwood Park. Two stands were built on either side of the pitch, one covered and one uncovered, with a pavilion brought from Underwood Park (which had also previously been moved from Blackstoun Park when Abercorn relocated to Underwood Park in 1889) erected in the north-west corner of the site. There were also embankments on the eastern side of the pitch.

The first league match was played at Old Ralston Park on 26 August 1899 when Abercorn beat Leith Athletic 3–0. The probable record attendance was set on 9 February 1901 for a Scottish Qualifying Cup semi-final against Third Lanark when 5,000 saw Abercorn beaten 1–0.

In 1909 the club moved to a site directly to the west of Old Ralston Park, which became known as New Ralston Park. The final league match at Old Ralston Park was played on 20 March 1909, with Abercorn beating Ayr Parkhouse 4–0. The site was subsequently used as a clay pit by the adjacent brickworks.
