= Firs Park =

Former football stadium in Falkirk, Scotland

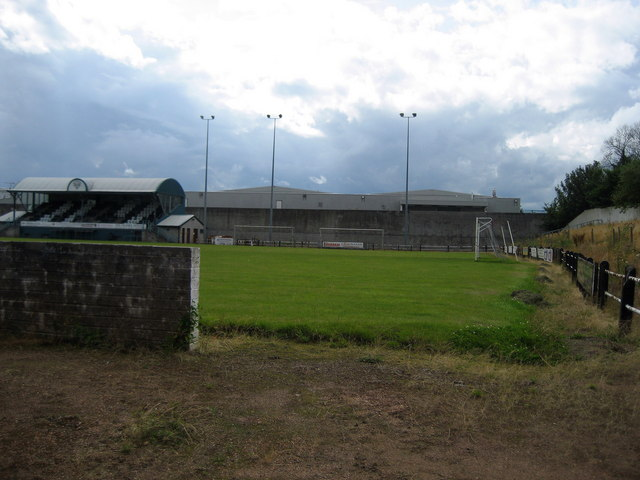
- Firs Park shortly after closure

- Location within Falkirk
- Location: Firs Street, Falkirk, Stirlingshire, Scotland
- Coordinates: 56°00′18″N 3°46′44″W
- Owner: East Stirlingshire F.C.
- Capacity: 1,800 (200 seated)
- Surface: Grass
- Record attendance: 12,000 v Partick Thistle; 21 February 1921
- Field size: 112 x 72 yards

Construction
- Opened: 1921
- Closed: 2008
- Demolished: 2012
- Architect: Archibald Simpson

Tenants
- East Stirlingshire F.C. (1921–64 and 1965–2008)

Firs Park was a football stadium in Falkirk, Scotland, which was the home of East Stirlingshire F.C. between 1921 and 2008. It was located on Firs Street, 0.3 miles north-east of the town centre. At the time of closing the ground had a capacity of 1,800 with 200 seated.

== History ==
=== Early years ===
East Stirlingshire F.C. was formed in 1880 when a group of friends from a cricket team called Bainsford Blue Bonnets formed a football team under the name Britannia. At the end of the club's first year of existence it found a home at Randyford Park in the east of Falkirk. At the time, the ground's previous tenant was a cricket team called East Stirlingshire Cricket Club and in 1881, Britannia also adopted the East Stirlingshire name, which stands to this day. By the time the club was admitted to the Scottish Football League in 1900, the club was playing some home games at Merchiston Park in Bainsford and from 1907 onwards it became permanent. The club's first ever league game at Merchiston Park was a 3–2 defeat to Airdrieonians in August 1900 in front of a crowd of 2,500.

In 1920, the club was forced to move from Bainsford when a railway line was built across Merchiston Park. The club set about looking for a new site to play its home games and a derelict factory site on Firs Street in Falkirk was chosen. The site was named Firs Park after the street in which it was located and was officially opened in 1921 and would be the club's home for the next 87 years. The first ever opposition at Firs Park was Heart of Midlothian F.C.

Shortly after opening, the club's record attendance was set on 21 February 1921 in a Scottish Cup third round tie against eventual champions Partick Thistle F.C., when 12,000 people watched the match. This remained the record attendance for the club during its entire tenure at Firs Park as crowds became smaller due to crowd regulation. In 2007, a limit of 750 was set by police during a Challenge Cup tie with Greenock Morton F.C. This was due to the small number of turnstiles and there only being one main exit gate.

=== Merger with Clydebank Juniors F.C. ===
In 1964, the board of directors at the club controversially merged East Stirlingshire and junior club Clydebank Juniors F.C. to create East Stirlingshire Clydebank. As a result, the new club relocated to Kilbowie Park in Clydebank and Firs Park was closed. However, the fans won a legal challenge against the move and the club returned to Firs Park and E.S. Clydebank was disbanded. East Stirlingshire F.C. was reformed in 1965. In the meantime, however, the merged club had taken the enclosure roof and floodlights from Firs Park.

Apart from replacing the roof and floodlights, there were few changes to Firs Park until it closed. The Main Stand was replaced in 1992, with the club opting for a near replica of the previous stand. At closure, the stadium had a seating capacity of 200 with room for a further 1,600 standees.

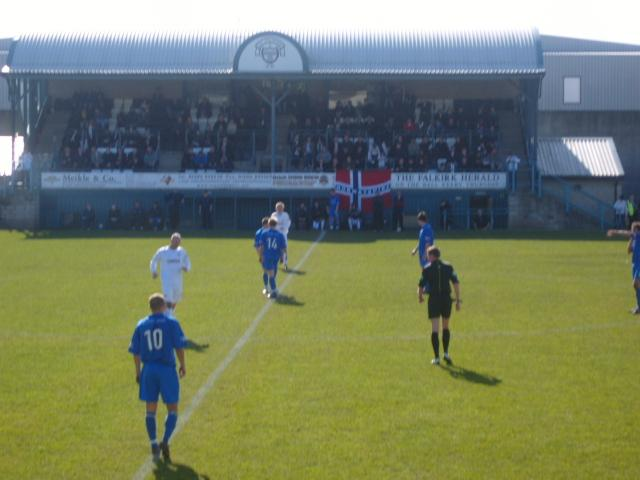
The final game played at Firs Park

=== Final match and closure ===
Due to the prohibitive costs of improving facilities to meet regulations set by the Scottish Football Association, the club decided to leave Firs Park at the end of the 2007–08 season. The last league game to be played at Firs Park was a 3–1 victory for the Shire against Montrose F.C., which meant the club avoided finishing bottom of the Scottish Football League for a sixth consecutive season.

East Stirlingshire did subsequently play one last game at Firs Park, a "closed doors" pre-season friendly vs St Johnstone on Tuesday 15 July 2008, losing 1–3.

=== Relocation ===
The club groundshared with neighbours Stenhousemuir at their Ochilview Park home. The move was originally intended be for a period of five years during which the club planned to develop a new venue in Falkirk. After lying unused and derelict for almost four years, Firs Park was demolished in January 2012. In March 2018, it was announced The Shire had secured a groundshare at Falkirk Stadium. The first game in their new home was on 5 July 2018; a 3-1 pre-season friendly win over Frickley Athletic.

== Greyhound racing ==
Greyhound racing took place from 29 October 1930 until 13 May 1933. The racing was independent (unlicensed) and ended due to the fact that two other circuits opened at nearby Diamond Stadium (Brockville Greyhound Racecourse) and Brockville Park.

== See also ==
- Stadium relocations in Scottish football
