= Boag =

Boag is a surname. Notable people with the surname include:

- Carly Boag (born 1991), Australian basketball player;
- Colin Boag, British Army officer;
- Erin Boag (born 1975), New Zealand ballroom dancer;
- G. T. Boag (1884–1969), British civil servant;
- James Boag I (c. 1804–1890), Australian brewery founder and proprietor;
- James Boag II (1854–1919), Australian brewery proprietor;
- John Boag (disambiguation), various people;
- Keith Boag, Canadian television journalist;
- Michelle Boag (born 1954), New Zealand public relations practitioner;
- Peter Boag, Canadian scientist;
- Stuart Boag (disambiguation), various people;
- Tommy Boag (1814–1977), Australian rules footballer;
- Wally Boag (1920–2011), American stage performer;
- Yvonne Boag (born 1954), Scottish-born Australian artist.

== See also ==
- Boag's Brewery, an Australian brewery
