= 1990–91 Dumbarton F.C. season =

Dumbarton
1990–1991 season
- Manager: Billy Lamont
- Stadium: Boghead Park, Dumbarton
- Scottish League Division 2: 7th
- Scottish Cup: First Round
- Scottish League Cup: First Round
- B&Q Centenary Cup: First Round
- Top goalscorer: League: John McQuade (14); All: John McQuade (15)
- Highest home attendance: 800
- Lowest home attendance: 250
- Average home league attendance: 530

Season 1990–91 was the 107th football season in which Dumbarton competed at a Scottish national level, entering the Scottish Football League for the 85th time, the Scottish Cup for the 96th time, the Scottish League Cup for the 44th time and the Centenary Cup for the first time.

== Overview ==
Hopes were high for the new season with the return of Billy Lamont at the helm however it was to be a combination of poor discipline and injuries which would in the end spoil a promising season. In fact one point from the first 5 league matches was an early concern but a subsequent unbeaten run of 8 games pulled Dumbarton within a couple of points of the leaders. The discipline and injury problems then kicked in and took with it any hopes of promotion. A late surge however lifted the club to a mid-table finish.

In the national cup competitions it was a case of early exits. In Scottish Cup, Dumbarton fell in the first round to Montrose, after a drawn match.

In the League Cup, a similar story with defeat to East Stirling, on penalties, after extra time.

Finally, on the centenary year of the Scottish League, a new competition was introduced for non-Premier Division clubs. The Centenary Cup saw Dumbarton drawn against First Division Clyde in the first round, but it was to be defeat by the odd goal in seven.

Locally, there was some cheer as Dumbarton retained the Stirlingshire Cup with a final win over East Stirling.

== Results and fixtures ==
Win Draw Loss

=== Scottish Second Division ===
25 August 1990 Second Division	East Fife	2–1	Dumbarton	Bayview Park, Methil
	Lennox 49'; Taylor (pen.)		McQuade 62'	Attendance: 550; Referee: J Timmons

1 September 1990 Second Division	Dumbarton	1–1	Arbroath	Boghead Park
	Morrison 62'		Sorbie 67'	Attendance: 476; Referee: G Smith

8 September 1990 Second Division	Dumbarton	1–3	Cowdenbeath	Boghead Park
	MacIver 63'		Malone 16', 74'; MacKenzie 39'	Attendance: 500; Referee: L Mottram

15 September 1990 Second Division	Albion Rovers	3–2	Dumbarton	Cliftonhill Stadium
	Lachlan 33'; McKenzie 56'; McAneney 65'		Gibson 17'; Chapman 90'	Attendance: 475; Referee: W Young

18 September 1990 Second Division	Dumbarton	0–1	Stranraer	Boghead Park
			McMillan 21'	Attendance: 400

22 September 1990 Second Division	Stenhousemuir	1–1	Dumbarton	Ochilview Park
	McCormick 36'		Chapman 2'	Attendance: 600; Referee: H Williamson

29 September 1990 Second Division	Dumbarton	1–0	Queen's Park	Boghead Park
	McQuade 58'			Attendance: 600; Referee: J McKinnon

6 October 1990 Second Division	Dumbarton	0–0	Stirling Albion	Boghead Park
				Attendance: 600

10 October 1990 Second Division	Queen of the South	1–2	Dumbarton	Palmerston Park
	Sim 86'		Chapman 11', 13'	Attendance: 624

6 October 1990 Second Division	Dumbarton	2–1	East Stirling	Boghead Park
	Morrison 47' (pen.); McQuade 52'		McDowall 80'	Attendance: 250

20 October 1990 Second Division	Alloa Athletic	0–1	Dumbarton	Recreation Park, Alloa
			Morrison 42'	Attendance: 614; Referee: M McGinlay

27 October 1990 Second Division	Dumbarton	1–1	Berwick Rangers	Boghead Park
	McQuade 56'		Sokoluk 25'	Attendance: 550

3 November 1990 Second Division	Montrose	1–2	Dumbarton	Links Park
	Fotheringham 43'		McQuade 14', 32'	Attendance: 480; Referee: J Renton

10 November 1990 Second Division	Arbroath	2–1	Dumbarton	Gayfield Park
	Bennett 54' (pen.), 90'		McQuade 34'	Attendance: 411; Referee: I Taylor

17 November 1990 Second Division	Dumbarton	3–2	East Fife	Boghead Park
	McQuade 44'; Gibson 47'; McGinlay 84'		Brown 10' (pen.); Scott 62'	Attendance: 500; Referee: W Morrison

24 November 1990 Second Division	Cowdenbeath	4–2	Dumbarton	Central Park, Cowdenbeath
	Buckley 16'; Malone 29'; Ross 45'; Wright 80'		Morrison 8'; Boyd 70'	Attendance: 230; Referee: D Yeats

1 December 1990 Second Division	Dumbarton	2–2	Albion Rovers	Boghead Park
	Morrison 59' (pen.); McQuade 69'		Stalker 11'; Henderson 72'	Attendance: 400; Referee: D Millar

15 December 1990 Second Division	Berwick Rangers	2–1	Dumbarton	Shielfield Park
	Ainslie 18'; Todd 80'		Morrison 30' (pen.)	Attendance: 322

22 December 1990 Second Division	Dumbarton	1–1	Montrose	Boghead Park
	Morrison 65' (pen.)		Allan 52'	Attendance: 476; Referee: H Williamson

12 January 1991 Second Division	Dumbarton	0–2	Queen of the South	Boghead Park
			Gordon 27'; Robertson 33'	Attendance: 600; Referee: D Syme

9 January 1991 Second Division	Stirling Albion	2–0	Dumbarton	Annfield Stadium
	Lloyd 65'; Moore 76'			Attendance: 650; Referee: D McVicar

22 January 1991 Second Division	East Stirling	2–1	Dumbarton	Firs Park
	Diver 10'; Lytwyn 28' (pen.)		Morrison	Attendance: 214

26 January 1991 Second Division	Dumbarton	0–0	Alloa Athletic	Boghead Park
				Attendance: 550

30 January 1991 Second Division	Stranraer	2–1	Dumbarton	Stair Park
	Harkness 25', 29'		McQuade 20'	Attendance: 420; Referee: J McGillvray

2 February 1991 Second Division	Dumbarton	0–0	Stenhousemuir	Boghead Park
				Attendance: 450; Referee: D Millar

9 February 1991 Second Division	Queen's Park	1–1	Dumbarton	Hampden Park
	McNamee 24'		MacIver 65'	Attendance: 849; Referee: W Young

2 February 1991 Second Division	Dumbarton	0–2	Albion Rovers	Boghead Park
			Cadden 20'; Clark 67' (pen.)	Attendance: 500

27 February 1991 Second Division	Cowdenbeath	1-3	Dumbarton	Central Park, Cowdenbeath
	Ross 84'		Edgar 4'; McGoveran 49' (o.g.); McQuade 85'	Attendance: 150

2 March 1991 Second Division	Dumbarton	2–1	East Fife	Boghead Park
	MacIver 20'; Meechan 52'		Brown 10'	Attendance: 500; Referee: R Orr

9 March 1991 Second Division	Stirling Albion	0-1	Dumbarton	Annfield Stadium
			McQuade 80'	Attendance: 900; Referee: A Huett

16 March 1991 Second Division	Alloa Athletic	2-1	Dumbarton	Recreation Park, Alloa
	Ormond 36'; Smith 48'		Martin 86'	Attendance: 385; Referee: W Innes

23 March 1991 Second Division	Dumbarton	2–0	Berwick Rangers	Boghead Park
	MacIver 38'; Boyd 72'			Attendance: 620; Referee: G Evans

30 March 1991 Second Division	Dumbarton	2–2	Montrose	Boghead Park
	Dempsey 46'; Morrison 52' (pen.)		Den Bieman 57'; Mayer 63'	Attendance: 600; Referee: D Brooks

10 April 1991 Second Division	Stranraer	1-4	Dumbarton	Stair Park
	McNiven 48'		Gibson 38'; McQuade 67'; MacIver 79', 90'	Attendance: 300; Referee: E Martindale

13 April 1991 Second Division	Dumbarton	2–1	Stenhousemuir	Boghead Park
	Meechan 18'; Gibson 42'		Speirs 52' (pen.)	Attendance: 600; Referee: M Clark

20 April 1991 Second Division	Arbroath	0-1	Dumbarton	Gayfield Park
			Boyd 36' (pen.)	Attendance: 257; Referee: D Brooks

27 April 1991 Second Division	East Stirling	2-0	Dumbarton	Firs Park
	Diver 30'; Walker, D 60' (pen.)			Attendance: 254; Referee: K Clark

4 May 1991 Second Division	Dumbarton	2–0	Queen of the South	Boghead Park
	McQuade 31'; McNair 58' (pen.)			Attendance: 700; Referee: R Tait

11 May 1991 Second Division	Dumbarton	1–0	Queen's Park	Boghead Park
	McNair 59'			Attendance: 800

=== Skol Cup ===
14 August 1990 League Cup round 1	East Stirling	2–2 (a.e.t.) (4-1 p)	Dumbarton	Firs Park
	Russell 69'; Watson 81'		MacIver 11', 49'	Attendance: 350

=== B&Q Centenary Cup ===
3 October 1990 Challenge Cup round 1	Clyde	4–3	Dumbarton	Douglas Park
	McAulay 42'; Clark 66', 67'; Gilmour 73' (pen.)		Morrison 7'; Hughes 49'; McQuade 85'	Attendance: 350

=== Tennant's Scottish Cup ===
11 December 1990 Cup round 1	Montrose	0–0	Dumbarton	Links Park
				Attendance: 365; Referee: I Taylor

17 December 1990 Cup round 1R	Dumbarton	1–4	Montrose	Boghead Park
	Morrison 63' (pen.)		Kerr 24' (pen.), 61'; Murray 83'; Allan 86'	Attendance: 500; Referee: I Taylor

=== Stirlingshire Cup ===
17 August 1990 First Round	Dumbarton	3–2	Clydebank	Boghead Park
	McQuade, J 14', 83'; Chapman 62'		Ferguson 28'; Harvey 78'

13 May 1991 Semi Final	Stenhousemuir	1–1 (2-4 p)	Dumbarton	Ochilview Park
	Nelson 30'		McGuire 89'	Referee: B McGinlay

15 May 1991 Final	Dumbarton	2–1	East Stirling	Boghead Park
	Millar 31'; Meechan 57'		Ross 81'	Referee: B McGinlay

=== Pre-season/Other Matches ===
8 August 1990 Friendly	Baillieston	3–3	Dumbarton	Station Park, Baillieston
	Goal		McQuade, J Chapman

11 August 1990 Friendly	Vale of Leven	1–2	Dumbarton	Millburn Park
	Montgomery 42'		Morrison 35' (pen.)

23 February 1991 Friendly	Clydebank	3–2	Dumbarton	Kilbowie Park
	Henry; Templeton; Kelly		Boyd; McQuade

== League table ==
Pos	Team	Pld	W	D	L	GF	GA	GD	Pts
5	Queen's Park	39	17	8	14	48	42	+6	42
6	Stranraer	39	19	4	16	62	58	+4	42
7	Dumbarton	39	15	10	14	50	49	+1	40
8	Berwick Rangers	39	15	10	14	51	57	−6	40
9	Alloa Athletic	39	13	11	15	51	46	+5	37

Rules for classification: 1) points; 2) goal difference; 3) number of goals scored.

== Player statistics ==
=== Squad ===
No.	Pos	Nat	Player	Total		Second Division		League Cup		Challenge Cup		Scottish Cup	
No.	Pos	Nat	Player	Apps	Goals	Apps	Goals	Apps	Goals	Apps	Goals	Apps	Goals
	GK	(Scotland) SCO	Paul Graham	1	0	1+0	0	0+0	0	0+0	0	0+0	0
	GK	(Scotland) SCO	Hugh Stevenson	36	0	33+0	0	0+0	0	1+0	0	2+0	0
	GK	(Scotland) SCO	Boyd Strachan	6	0	5+0	0	1+0	0	0+0	0	0+0	0
	DF	(Scotland) SCO	John Boyd	36	3	29+3	3	1+0	0	1+0	0	2+0	0
	DF	(Scotland) SCO	Alan Foster	2	0	2+0	0	0+0	0	0+0	0	0+0	0
	DF	(Scotland) SCO	Stevie Gow	34	0	31+0	0	1+0	0	0+0	0	2+0	0
	DF	(Scotland) SCO	Martin Melvin	17	0	17+0	0	0+0	0	0+0	0	0+0	0
	MF	(Scotland) SCO	Jim Chapman	12	4	11+0	4	0+0	0	1+0	0	0+0	0
	MF	(Scotland) SCO	Jim Dempsey	40	1	35+1	1	1+0	0	1+0	0	2+0	0
	MF	(Scotland) SCO	Jim Hughes	10	1	5+4	0	0+0	0	0+1	1	0+0	0
	MF	(Scotland) SCO	Steve Marshall	5	0	3+2	0	0+0	0	0+0	0	0+0	0
	MF	(Scotland) SCO	Jim Marsland	26	0	19+4	0	0+1	0	1+0	0	0+1	0
	MF	(Scotland) SCO	Paul Martin	14	1	14+0	1	0+0	0	0+0	0	0+0	0
	MF	(Scotland) SCO	Martin McGarvey	4	0	3+1	0	0+0	0	0+0	0	0+0	0
	MF	(Scotland) SCO	Jim McGinlay	16	1	9+4	1	1+0	0	0+0	0	2+0	0
	MF	(Scotland) SCO	Paul McKenzie	20	0	18+1	0	0+0	0	1+0	0	0+0	0
	MF	(Scotland) SCO	Colin McNair	27	2	24+1	2	0+0	0	1+0	0	1+0	0
	MF	(Scotland) SCO	Jim Meechan	23	2	19+2	2	0+0	0	0+0	0	2+0	0
	MF	(Scotland) SCO	Stuart Millar	28	0	10+16	0	0+0	0	1+0	0	1+0	0
	MF	(Scotland) SCO	Steve Morrison	41	10	32+5	8	1+0	0	1+0	1	2+0	1
	FW	(Scotland) SCO	David Edgar	6	2	4+2	2	0+0	0	0+0	0	0+0	0
	FW	(Scotland) SCO	Charlie Gibson	30	4	25+1	4	1+0	0	1+0	0	2+0	0
	FW	(Scotland) SCO	Stuart MacIver	22	8	19+2	6	1+0	2	0+0	0	0+0	0
	FW	(Scotland) SCO	Dougie McCracken	16	0	12+1	0	1+0	0	1+0	0	1+0	0
	FW	(Scotland) SCO	Paul McGrogan	1	0	0+0	0	0+1	0	0+0	0	0+0	0
	FW	(Scotland) SCO	Willie McGuire	16	1	12+1	1	1+0	0	0+0	0	1+1	0
	FW	(Scotland) SCO	John McQuade	43	15	35+4	14	1+0	0	1+0	1	2+0	0
	FW	(Scotland) SCO	T Nolan	1	0	1+0	0	0+0	0	0+0	0	0+0	0
	FW	(Scotland) SCO	Paul Quinn	12	0	0+10	0	0+0	0	0+0	0	0+2	0
	FW	(Scotland) SCO	G Shearer	1	1	1+0	1	0+0	0	0+0	0	0+0	0

=== Transfers ===
==== Players in ====
Player	From	Date
(Scotland) Jim Marsland	(Scotland) Kilpatrick Juv	15 Jun 1990
(Scotland) Jim Chapman	(Scotland) Albion Rovers	19 Jul 1990
(Scotland) Willie McGuire	(Scotland) Partick Thistle	19 Jul 1990
(Scotland) Dougie McCracken	(Scotland) Ayr United	8 Aug 1990
(Scotland) Paul McKenzie	(Scotland) Falkirk	13 Aug 1990
(Scotland) Stuart Millar	(Scotland) Alloa Athletic	1 Sep 1990
(Scotland) Colin McNair	(Scotland) Motherwell	25 Sep 1990
(Scotland) Jim Meechan	(Scotland) Irvine Meadow	5 Oct 1990
(Scotland) Martin Melvin	(Scotland) Falkirk	22 Dec 1990
(Scotland) T Nolan		22 Dec 1990
(Scotland) Paul Graham	(Scotland) Morton (loan)	21 Jan 1991
(Scotland) G Shearer		22 Jan 1991
(Scotland) Paul Martin	(Scotland) Hamilton	30 Jan 1991
(Scotland) David Edgar	(Scotland) Ferguslie United	11 Feb 1991
(Scotland) Alan Foster	(Scotland) Kilsyth Rangers	20 Feb 1991
(Scotland) Martin McGarvey	(Scotland) Irvine Meadow	20 Feb 1991
(Scotland) Steve Marshall	(Scotland) Kilmarnock	19 Mar 1991

==== Players out ====
Player	To	Date
(Scotland) Bernie Grant	(Scotland) Pollok	1 Jul 1990
(Scotland) Paul McKenzie	(Scotland) Hamilton	30 Jan 1991
(Scotland) Paul McGrogan	(Scotland) Shotts Bon Accord	
(Scotland) Colin Spence		

== Reserve team ==
Dumbarton competed in the Scottish Reserve League (West), and with 6 wins and 4 draws from 30 games, finished 15th of 16.

In the Reserve League Cup, Dumbarton lost out to Hamilton in the second round.

== Trivia ==
- The League match against East Stirling on 27 April marked John McQuade's 100th appearance for Dumbarton in all national competitions - the 98th Dumbarton player to reach this milestone.

== See also ==
- 1990–91 in Scottish football
