= List of Hamilton Academical F.C. managers =

Hamilton Academical Football Club is a professional football club from Hamilton, South Lanarkshire. They were established in 1874 and entered the Scottish Cup for the first time in 1876.

In November 1897 they were admitted to the Scottish Football League for the 1897–98 season, following the dismissal of Renton, with the club taking over their previous four results and remaining fixtures for the season.

The club advertised for a Secretary/Manager, a new post, in March 1914. There were nearly 100 applicants. A short list of 15 was drawn up and from them 3 people were to be interviewed, James Collins, who was Secretary of the Glasgow Junior League, Peter Hodge the former Secretary/Manager of Raith Rovers and Alex Raisbeck an ex-Scotland player and then playing for Partick Thistle.

Raisbeck was chosen and would take up his duties in May 1914 when the season officially closed.

The club's longest serving manager was Willie McAndrew who became manager in 1925 and stayed until 1946. McAndrew managed arguably the greatest Hamilton team when they finished 4th in the 1934–35 season, their highest ever placing, and were Scottish Cup finalists.

John Lambie has the best record in terms of league trophies; having won the Scottish First Division twice.

== Managerial Performance - League ==
The Scottish Football league began with one division of teams in 1890–91. Since then it has expanded and contracted between one and four divisions.

To gauge a manager's performance the list below is broken down into the level of league they were in at the time they were league winners or runners-up. Currently the Scottish Premier League would be classed as the 1st tier of Scottish football league system while the Scottish Third Division would be classed as the 4th.

- Second tier

Manager	Winner	Runner-up	Winning years
John Lambie	2	0	1985–86 Scottish First Division / 1987–88 Scottish First Division
Billy Reid	1	0	2007–08 Scottish First Division
Andrew Wylie	0	1 (1952–53)	
Andy Paton	0	1 (1964–65)	

- Third tier

Manager	Winner	Runner-up	Winning years
Sandy Clark	0	1 (1996–97)	
Allan Maitland	0	1 (2003–04)	

- Fourth tier

Manager	Winner	Runner-up	Winning years
Ally Dawson	1	0	2000–01 Scottish Third Division

== Managerial Performance - Cups ==
The premier cup competition in Scotland is the Scottish Cup. The club have also gained success in the Scottish Challenge Cup.

- Scottish Cup

Manager	Winner	Runner-up	Winning years
Willie McAndrew	0	1 (1935)	

- Scottish Challenge Cup

Manager	Winner	Runner-up	Winning years
Billy McLaren	1	0	1991
Iain Munro	1	0	1992
Billy Reid	0	1 (2005)	

== Managerial statistics - League ==
Below is the full Scottish League record of every Hamilton manager (excluding manager's who were in control for less than 20 games).

As of 1 May 2007.

Name	From	To	Played	Won	Drew	Lost	For	Against	Win%
Alex Raisbeck	1914	1922	304	104	63	137	433	543	34.21
David Buchanan	1922	1923	42	11	8	23	44	63	26.19
Scott Duncan	1923	1925	80	32	10	38	111	126	40.00
Willie McAndrew	1925	1946	533	212	99	222	1028	1082	39.77
Jimmy McStay	1946	1951	151	54	36	61	284	281	35.76
Andrew Wylie	1951	1953	69	33	9	27	129	122	47.83
Jackie Cox	1953	1956	84	32	14	38	175	191	26.88
John Lowe	1956	1958	72	26	17	29	139	147	36.11
Andy Paton	1959	1968	324	137	57	130	623	646	42.28
Billy Lamont	1969	1969	39	11	8	20	48	84	28.21
Tommy Ewing	1969	1970	29	7	1	21	34	82	24.14
Bobby Shearer	1970	1971	38	7	7	24	50	96	18.42
Ronnie Simpson	1971	1972	31	5	8	18	33	70	16.13
Eric Smith	1972	1978	195	84	49	62	304	239	43.08
Davie McParland	1978	1982	168	67	36	65	255	249	39.88
John Blackley	1982	1983	27	7	10	10	34	72	25.93
Bertie Auld	1983	1984	23	5	8	10	24	30	21.74
John Lambie	1984	1988	211	82	52	77	281	295	38.86
Jim Dempsey	1988	1989	34	7	7	20	25	57	20.59
Billy McLaren	1990	1992	88	39	24	25	126	96	44.32
Iain Munro	1992	1996	164	64	38	62	219	206	39.02
Sandy Clark	1996	1998	73	32	20	21	120	86	43.84
Colin Miller	1998	1999	33	3	8	22	22	63	9.10
Ally Dawson	1999	2002	103	45	31	27	160	109	43.69
Chris Hillcoat	2002	2003	36	12	11	13	43	48	33.33
Allan Maitland	2003	2005	72	30	19	23	105	83	41.67
Billy Reid	2005	Present	106	59	25	23	167	108	62.54
