= 1990–91 Dundee F.C. season =

Dundee
1990–91 season
- Manager: Gordon Wallace
- First Division: 3rd
- Scottish Cup: Quarter-finals
- League Cup: 2nd round
- Challenge Cup: Champions
- Top goalscorer: League: Keith Wright (18); All: Billy Dodds (22)
Home colours

The 1990–91 season was the 89th season in which Dundee competed at a Scottish national level, playing in the Scottish First Division after being relegated the previous season. Dundee would finish in 3rd place and would miss out on promotion by a single point. Dundee would also compete in both the Scottish League Cup and the Scottish Cup, where they were knocked out by Queen of the South in the 2nd round of the League Cup, and by inter-city rivals Dundee United in the quarter-finals of the Scottish Cup. Dundee would also compete in the inaugural Scottish Challenge Cup, and would win the competition, defeating Ayr United in the final.

== Scottish First Division ==
Statistics provided by Dee Archive.

Match day	Date	Opponent	H/A	Score	Dundee scorer(s)	Attendance
1	25 August	Partick Thistle	H	1–1	Dodds	5,040
2	1 September	Greenock Morton	A	1–0	McSkimming	1,865
3	8 September	Clydebank	A	3–1	Wright (2), Dodds	1,775
4	15 September	Clyde	H	3–1	Wright (2), Dodds (pen.)	3,518
5	18 September	Hamilton Academical	A	0–1		1,773
6	22 September	Forfar Athletic	A	1–1	McQuillan	3,053
7	29 September	Kilmarnock	H	1–1	Dodds (pen.)	4,573
8	6 October	Ayr United	A	4–2	McLeod, Chisholm, Dodds, Wright	2,493
9	9 October	Airdrieonians	H	0–1		6,360
10	13 October	Raith Rovers	A	1–1	S. Campbell	3,494
11	20 October	Falkirk	H	2–2	Wright, Dodds	4,013
12	27 October	Brechin City	A	3–1	Wright (2), Dodds	2,011
13	3 November	Meadowbank Thistle	H	1–2	McSkimming	3,404
14	17 November	Partick Thistle	A	3–1	McLeod, West, Wright	5,476
15	20 November	Greenock Morton	H	1–0	McBride	3,554
16	24 November	Airdrieonians	A	1–0	Chisholm	5,000
17	1 December	Ayr United	H	1–0	Dodds	3,416
18	8 December	Kilmarnock	A	1–2	Wright	4,458
19	18 December	Forfar Athletic	H	4–1	Wright, Dodds, McBride, Dinnie	3,102
20	22 December	Brechin City	H	1–2	Dinnie	3,172
21	29 December	Meadowbank Thistle	A	1–0	McSkimming	1,000
22	1 January	Raith Rovers	H	2–1	Chisholm, Jamieson	4,815
23	5 January	Falkirk	A	0–1		7,672
24	2 February	Hamilton Academical	H	3–2	West (2), Shannon	3,153
25	5 February	Clydebank	H	1–0	Craig	2,793
26	2 March	Airdrieonians	A	1–0	Dodds (pen.)	4,500
27	5 March	Ayr United	H	4–0	Wright (3), Dodds	3,379
28	9 March	Brechin City	H	0–1		3,051
29	16 March	Forfar Athletic	H	1–0	Craig	2,618
30	23 March	Clyde	A	2–4	Craig (2)	1,500
31	26 March	Partick Thistle	A	0–1		3,500
32	30 March	Clydebank	A	1–1	Wright	1,235
33	6 April	Greenock Morton	H	1–0	Wright	2,515
34	13 April	Falkirk	A	0–0		9,300
35	20 April	Meadowbank Thistle	H	4–0	Dinnie, Dodds (2), Wright	2,716
36	27 April	Raith Rovers	H	2–0	Jamieson, McMartin	3,756
37	30 April	Clyde	A	1–0	Wright	2,500
38	3 May	Kilmarnock	A	0–0		5,712
39	10 May	Hamilton Academical	A	2–1	Shannon (pen.), Dodds	3,136

=== League table ===
Pos	Team	Pld	W	D	L	GF	GA	GD	Pts	Promotion or relegation
1	Falkirk (C, P)	39	21	12	6	70	35	+35	54	Promotion to the Premier Division
2	Airdrieonians (P)	39	21	11	7	69	43	+26	53	Promotion to the Premier Division
3	Dundee	39	22	8	9	59	33	+26	52	
4	Partick Thistle	39	16	13	10	56	53	+3	45	
5	Kilmarnock	39	15	13	11	58	48	+10	43	

Source: RSSSF and statto
Rules for classification: 1) points; 2) goal difference; 3) number of goals scored.
(C) Champions; (P) Promoted

== Scottish League Cup ==
Statistics provided by Dee Archive.

Match day	Date	Opponent	H/A	Score	Dundee scorer(s)	Attendance
2nd round	20 August	Queen of the South	A	2–2	Chisholm, Forsyth	1,346
Queen of the South won 4–1 on penalties

== Scottish Cup ==
Statistics provided by Dee Archive.

Match day	Date	Opponent	H/A	Score	Dundee scorer(s)	Attendance
3rd round	26 January	Brechin City	H	1–0	West	3,446
4th round	23 February	Kilmarnock	H	2–0	McMartin, Dodds	9,195
Quarter-finals	13 March	Dundee United	A	1–3	Dodds	16,228

== Scottish Challenge Cup ==
Statistics provided by Dee Archive.

Match day	Date	Opponent	H/A	Score	Dundee scorer(s)	Attendance
2nd round	16 October	Alloa Athletic	A	5–3	Dodds (2x pen.), S. Campbell, Wright, Shannon	915
Quarter-finals	23 October	Raith Rovers	A	1–0 (A.E.T.)	Dodds	4,061
Semi-finals	30 October	Kilmarnock	A	2–0	Wright (2)	7,933
Final	11 November	Ayr United	N	3–2	Dodds (3) (pen.)	11,506

== Player statistics ==
Statistics provided by Dee Archive

No.	Pos	Nat	Player	Total		First Division		Scottish Cup		League Cup		Challenge Cup	
No.	Pos	Nat	Player	Apps	Goals	Apps	Goals	Apps	Goals	Apps	Goals	Apps	Goals
	DF	(Scotland) SCO	Kevin Bain	9	0	7	0	1	0	0	0	1	0
	MF	(Scotland) SCO	Stuart Beedie	9	0	8+1	0	0	0	0	0	0	0
	FW	(Scotland) SCO	Duncan Campbell	16	0	10+4	0	0+1	0	0	0	1	0
	DF	(Scotland) SCO	Stevie Campbell	8	2	3+2	1	1	0	0	0	1+1	1
	GK	(Scotland) SCO	Tam Carson	41	0	33	0	3	0	1	0	4	0
	DF	(Scotland) SCO	Gordon Chisholm	40	4	34	3	2	0	1	1	3	0
	DF	(Scotland) SCO	Mark Craib	24	0	17+2	0	2	0	0	0	3	0
	MF	(Scotland) SCO	Albert Craig	14	4	3+9	4	1+1	0	0	0	0	0
	DF	(Scotland) SCO	Alan Dinnie	31	3	25	3	3	0	0	0	3	0
	FW	(Scotland) SCO	Billy Dodds	45	22	37	14	3	2	1	0	4	6
	DF	(Scotland) SCO	Stewart Forsyth	25	1	18+3	0	1	0	1	1	2	0
	DF	(Scotland) SCO	Stephen Frail	33	0	25+1	0	3	0	0	0	3+1	0
	MF	(Scotland) SCO	Cammy Fraser	7	0	7	0	0	0	0	0	0	0
	DF	(Scotland) SCO	John Holt	10	0	4+4	0	0	0	0	0	1+1	0
	DF	(England) ENG	Willie Jamieson	46	2	38	2	3	0	1	0	4	0
	MF	(Scotland) SCO	Gary Lennox	1	0	0	0	0	0	0	0	0+1	0
	GK	(Scotland) SCO	Paul Mathers	6	0	6	0	0	0	0	0	0	0
	MF	(Scotland) SCO	Joe McBride	14	2	4+8	2	0	0	0+1	0	0+1	0
	MF	(Scotland) SCO	Gordon McLeod	28	2	23+1	2	0	0	1	0	3	0
	MF	(Scotland) SCO	Grant McMartin	21	2	15+4	1	2	1	0	0	0	0
	DF	(Scotland) SCO	John McQuillan	13	1	8+4	1	0	0	1	0	0	0
	MF	(Scotland) SCO	Shaun McSkimming	21	3	15+1	3	1	0	1	0	2+1	0
	DF	(Scotland) SCO	Rab Shannon	45	3	37	2	3	0	1	0	4	1
	MF	(England) ENG	Colin West	22	4	16+2	3	2	1	1	0	1	0
	FW	(Scotland) SCO	Keith Wright	43	21	36	18	2	0	1	0	4	3

== See also ==
- List of Dundee F.C. seasons
