= 1992 Scottish Challenge Cup final =

- Event: 1992–93 Scottish Challenge Cup
| Morton | Hamilton Academical |
| 2 | 3 |
- Date: 13 December 1992
- Venue: Love Street, Paisley
- Referee: J. J. Timmons (Kilwinning)
- Attendance: 7,391

The 1992 Scottish Challenge Cup final, also known as the B&Q Cup final for sponsorship reasons, was an association football match between Morton and Hamilton Academical on 13 December 1992 at Love Street in Paisley. It was the third final of the Scottish Challenge Cup since it was first organised in 1990 to celebrate the centenary of the Scottish Football League.

The match was Morton's first national cup final in 29 years since the 1963 Scottish League Cup final; whilst it was Hamilton Academicals's second consecutive appearance in the final of the tournament having won the 1991 competition the previous season. The tournament was contested by clubs below the Scottish Premier Division, with both finalists from the First Division.

Rowan Alexander scored first for Morton after 11 minutes but Gary Clark equalised after only one minute for Hamilton Academical. Referee Joe Timmons then got injured and had to be replaced. Shortly before half-time, Clark scored his second goal to give Hamilton Academical a 2–1 lead and midway through the second half Chris Hillcoat extended their lead to 3–1. With seven minutes remaining Alexander scored his second goal for Morton but Hamilton Academical held on to win 3–2 to become the first team to successfully defend the Scottish Challenge Cup.

== Route to the final ==
| Round | Opposition | Score |
|---|---|---|
| First round | Forfar Athletic (a) | 5–2 |
| Second round | Brechin City (a) | 2–1 |
| Quarter-final | Kilmarnock (a) | 2–1 |
| Semi-final | Montrose (h) | 3–1 (a.e.t.) |

=== Morton ===
The first round draw paired Morton with Forfar Athletic at Station Park with the away team winning 5–2 The second round was another away game in Angus at Brechin City, Morton won 2–1 to progress to the quarter-finals. A third away game of the tournament saw Morton travel to Kilmarnock and winning 2–1. The reward for reaching the semi-final was a first home game of the tournament with the opposition being Montrose. Morton won 3–1 after extra time, in the process reaching the Scottish Challenge Cup final for the first time.

=== Hamilton Academical ===
| Round | Opposition | Score |
|---|---|---|
| First round | Dumbarton (a) | 3–0 |
| Second round | Albion Rovers (a) | 2–0 |
| Quarter-final | Berwick Rangers (h) | 5–2 |
| Semi-final | Meadowbank Thistle (h) | 1–1 (a.e.t.) (2–1 pens.) |

Hamilton Academical travelled Dumbarton in the first round with the away team producing a 3–0 victory. The second round draw saw Hamilton travel to Albion Rovers, in another away game for Accies with the team winning 2–0 and a second clean sheet to progress to the quarter-final. The reward for reaching the quarter-final was a home game against Berwick Rangers at Douglas Park with the home team emerging 5–2 winners. The semi-final opposition was Meadowbank Thistle, and a second game at home with Hamilton Academical winning on penalties after a 1–1 draw after extra time, to book a place in the Scottish Challenge Cup final for the second time.

== Match ==
=== Details ===
13 December 1992
14:00 GMT

| Morton | 2–3 | Hamilton Academical |
|---|---|---|
| Alexander 11', 83' | Report | Hillcoat; Clark 12', |

Love Street, Paisley
Attendance: 7,391
Referee: Joe Timmons (Kilwinning)

=== Teams ===
MORTON:
| GK | (Scotland) David Wylie |
| DF | (Scotland) Derek Collins |
| DF | (Scotland) Mark Pickering |
| MF | (Scotland) Stuart Rafferty |
| DF | (Scotland) Martin Doak |
| DF | (Scotland) Dougie Johnstone |
| FW | (Scotland) Alex Mathie |
| MF | (Scotland) Alan Mahood | Substituted off |
| FW | (Scotland) Rowan Alexander |
| MF | (Scotland) Derek McInnes |
| FW | (Scotland) Jim Tolmie |
Substitutes:
| MF | (Scotland) John Gahagan | Substituted on |
| MF | (Scotland) Ian McDonald |
Manager:
(Scotland) Allan McGraw

HAMILTON ACADEMICAL:
| GK | | (Scotland) Allan Ferguson |
| DF | | (Scotland) Chris Hillcoat |
| DF | | (Canada) Colin Miller |
| MF | | (Scotland) Andy Millen |
| DF | | (Scotland) Jim Weir |
| DF | | (Scotland) Craig Napier |
| MF | | (Scotland) Michael Waters | Substituted off |
| FW | | (Scotland) Colin Harris |
| FW | | (Scotland) Colin Cramb | | Substituted off |
| MF | | (Scotland) Gary Clark |
| MF | | (Scotland) Paul McDonald |
Substitutes:
| DF | 12 | (Scotland) Paul McKenzie | Substituted on |
| FW | 14 | (Scotland) Kenny Ward | | Substituted on |
Manager:
(Scotland) Iain Munro

Match rules

- 90 minutes.
- 30 minutes of extra-time if necessary.
- Penalty shoot-out if scores still level.
