= 1992–93 Scottish Challenge Cup =

1992–93 B&Q Cup
Tournament details
- Country: Scotland
- Teams: 26

Final positions
- Champions: Hamilton Academical
- Runners-up: Morton

Tournament statistics
- Matches played: 25
- Goals scored: 83 (3.32 per match)

The 1992–93 Scottish Challenge Cup was the third season of the competition, which was also known as the B&Q Cup for sponsorship reasons, and was competed for by the 26 clubs in the Scottish Football League Division One and Two. The defending champions were Hamilton Academical, who defeated Ayr United 1–0 in the 1991 final.

The final was played on 13 December 1992, between Morton and Hamilton Academical at Love Street in Paisley. Hamilton Academical won 3–2, to defend the title for a second season.

== Schedule ==
| Round | First match date | Fixtures | Clubs |
|---|---|---|---|
| First round | Tue/Wed 6/7 October 1992 | 10 | 26 → 16 |
| Second round | Tuesday 20 October 1992 | 8 | 16 → 8 |
| Quarter-finals | Tue/Wed 27/28 October 1992 | 4 | 8 → 4 |
| Semi-finals | Tue/Wed 10/11 November 1992 | 2 | 4 → 2 |
| Final | Sunday 13 December 1992 | 1 | 2 → 1 |

== First round ==
Albion Rovers, Brechin City, Raith Rovers, Stirling Albion, Clydebank and Queen of the South entered the second round.

| 6 October 1992 | Arbroath | 3–0 | Dunfermline Athletic | Gayfield Park, Arbroath |

| Ayr United | 2–1 | St Mirren | Somerset Park, Ayr |

| Berwick Rangers | 2* – 2 (a.e.t.) | East Stirlingshire | Shielfield Park, Berwick-upon-Tweed |
| Berwick Rangers won on penalties |

| Dumbarton | 0–3 | Hamilton Academical | Boghead Park, Dumbarton |

| Forfar Athletic | 2–5 | Morton | Station Park, Forfar |

| Kilmarnock | 2–1 | Clyde | Rugby Park, Kilmarnock |

| 7 October 1992 | Meadowbank Thistle | 1 – 0 (a.e.t.) | East Fife | Meadowbank Stadium, Edinburgh |

| Queen's Park | 2 – 3 (a.e.t.) | Montrose | Hampden Park, Glasgow |

| Stenhousemuir | 2–4 | Cowdenbeath | Ochilview Park, Stenhousemuir |

| Stranraer | 3–2 | Alloa Athletic | Stair Park, Stranraer |

Source: SFL

== Second round ==
| 29 October 1992 | Albion Rovers | 0–2 | Hamilton Academical | Cliftonhill, Coatbridge |

| 29 October 1992 | Berwick Rangers | 1–0 | Arbroath | Shielfield Park, Berwick-upon-Tweed |

| 29 October 1992 | Brechin City | 1–2 | Morton | Glebe Park, Brechin |

| 29 October 1992 | Cowdenbeath | 0–4 | Montrose | Central Park, Cowdenbeath |

| 29 October 1992 | Kilmarnock | 1–0 | Ayr United | Rugby Park, Kilmarnock |

| 29 October 1992 | Raith Rovers | 0 – 0* (a.e.t.) | Meadowbank Thistle | Stark's Park, Kirkcaldy |
| | | | Meadowbank Thistle won on penalties |

| 29 October 1992 | Stirling Albion | 2–1 | Clydebank | Ochilview Park, Stenhousemuir |

| 29 October 1992 | Stranraer | 0–2 | Queen of the South | Stair Park, Stranraer |

Source: SFL

== Quarter-finals ==
27 October 1992

| Stirling Albion | 0–1 | Montrose |

Ochilview Park, Stenhousemuir

28 October 1992

| Hamilton Academical | 5–2 | Berwick Rangers |

Douglas Park, Hamilton

28 October 1992

| Kilmarnock | 1–2 | Morton |

Rugby Park, Kilmarnock

28 October 1992

| Meadowbank Thistle | 3–2 | Queen of the South |

Meadowbank Stadium, Edinburgh

== Semi-finals ==
10 November 1992

| Morton | 3 – 1 (a.e.t.) | Montrose |

Cappielow, Greenock

11 November 1992

| Hamilton Academical | 1 – 1 (a.e.t.) | Meadowbank Thistle |
|---|---|---|
| Hamilton Academical won on penalties |

Douglas Park, Hamilton

== Final ==
13 December 1992
15:00

| Morton | 2–3 | Hamilton Academical |
|---|---|---|
| Alexander, | Report | Hillcoat; Clark, |

Love Street, Paisley
Attendance: 7,391
Referee: J. Timmons
