= 1991 Scottish Challenge Cup final =

- Event: 1991–92 Scottish Challenge Cup
Hamilton Academical	Ayr United
1	0
- Date: 8 December 1991
- Venue: Fir Park, Motherwell
- Referee: Les Mottram (Forth)
- Attendance: 9,663

The 1991 Scottish Challenge Cup final, also known as the B&Q Cup final for sponsorship reasons, was an association football match between Hamilton Academical and Ayr United on 8 December 1991 at Fir Park in Motherwell. It was the second final of the Scottish Challenge Cup, and a continuation of the tournament organised the previous season to celebrate the centenary of the Scottish Football League.

The match was Hamilton Academical's first national final in 56 years since the Scottish Cup final of 1935; whilst it was Ayr United's second consecutive appearance in the final of the tournament having lost the inaugural final the previous season. The tournament was contested by clubs below the Scottish Premier Division, with both finalists from the First Division. The only goal of the match came from Colin Harris for Hamilton Academical to win 1–0.

== Route to the final ==
=== Hamilton Academical ===
Round	Opposition	Score
First round	Alloa Athletic (h)	5–1
Second round	Partick Thistle (a)	2–1
Quarter-final	East Fife (a)	3–2
Semi-final	Raith Rovers (h)	2–1

Hamilton Academical entered the first round with 20 other clubs from the First and Second Divisions; six clubs received random byes into the second round. The club was drawn against Alloa Athletic in the first round at home and won 5–1 at Douglas Park. In the next round Hamilton Academical travelled to Partick Thistle where they won 2–1 to progress to the quarter-finals. With eight clubs left in the competition, Hamilton faced East Fife away from home and won 3–2 to qualify for the semi-finals where they played Raith Rovers at Douglas Park to win 2–1 and progress to the final; their first national final since 1935.

=== Ayr United ===
Round	Opposition	Score
First round	Dundee (a)	2–0
Second round	Stenhousemuir (a)	2–0
Quarter-final	Stranraer (h)	2–0
Semi-final	Queen of the South (h)	3–2

In the first round Ayr United played Dundee in a repeat of the previous season's final, which the club lost 3–2 after extra time. This time Ayr United won the match 2–0 at Dens Park to progress to the second round. The next round was a match at Ochilview Park to face Stenhousemuir where it ended 2–0 to Ayr United. With eight clubs left in the competition, the club played Stranraer at Somerset Park and won 2–0 for the third consecutive round and progress to the semi-final. The draw for the semi-final paired the club with Queen of the South which Ayr United won 3–2 to reach the final of the tournament for the second year in a row.

== Pre-match ==
=== Analysis ===
Both Ayr United and Hamilton Academical played two games each at their respective homes of Somerset Park and Douglas Park, and two away games in the rounds preceding the final. Ayr United scored a total of nine goals and conceded only two before the final, compared with Hamilton Academical's twelve goals scored and five conceded. Ayr United kept a total of three clean sheets whilst Hamilton Academical kept none. This was the first appearance for Hamilton in the Scottish Challenge Cup final, whereas Ayr United had been defeated in the final of the previous season in the competition's inaugural year.

== Match ==
=== Details ===
8 December 1991
14:30 GMT

Hamilton Academical	1–0	Ayr United
Harris	Report

Fir Park, Motherwell
Attendance: 9,663
Referee: Les Mottram (Forth)

Hamilton Academical	Ayr United

GK	(Scotland) Rab McCulloch
DF	(Scotland) Kevin McKee
DF	(Canada) Colin Miller
MF	(Scotland) Andy Millen
DF	(Scotland) Jim Weir
DF	(Scotland) Paul McKenzie
FW	(Scotland) Colin Harris
MF	(Scotland) Billy Reid
FW	(Scotland) George McCluskey
MF	(Scotland) Gary Clark
MF	(Scotland) Paul McDonald
Manager:
(Scotland) Billy McLaren

GK	(Scotland) David Purdie
DF	(Scotland) David Kennedy
DF	(Scotland) Garry Agnew
DF	(England) Willie Furphy
DF	(Scotland) Nigel Howard
MF	(Scotland) Paul McLean
MF	(Scotland) Lee Gardner
FW	(Scotland) Tommy Bryce
FW	(Scotland) Ally Graham
MF	(Scotland) Tommy Walker
FW	(England) Mike Smith
Manager:
(Scotland) George Burley

Match rules

- 90 minutes.
- 30 minutes of extra-time if necessary.
- Penalty shoot-out if scores still level.
