= 1990 Scottish Challenge Cup final =

- Event: 1990–91 Scottish Challenge Cup
Ayr United	Dundee
2	3
- After extra time
- Date: 11 November 1990
- Venue: Fir Park, Motherwell
- Referee: K. J. Hope (Clarkston)
- Attendance: 11,506

The 1990 Scottish Challenge Cup final, also known as the B&Q Centenary Cup for sponsorship reasons, was an association football match between Ayr United and Dundee on 11 November 1990 at Fir Park in Motherwell. It was the final match of what was intended to be a one-off tournament organised to celebrate the 100th anniversary of the Scottish Football League however it continued for the next season. The match marked the first time Ayr United had reached the final of a national cup competition in its 80-year history whilst it was Dundee's first since contesting the 1980 Scottish League Cup final ten years beforehand.

The tournament was contested by clubs below the Scottish Premier Division with both finalists from the First Division. Ayr United scored first through Ian McAllister after 12 minutes but Billy Dodds scored twice to give Dundee a 2–1 lead; his first a penalty kick and second a header in the 72nd minute. Three minutes later David Smyth scored Ayr United's second goal to level the match at 2–2 to force extra time. During extra time Billy Dodds scored to complete a hat-trick which was enough for Dundee to win the match 3–2.

== Route to the final ==
=== Ayr United ===
Round	Opposition	Score
First round	Brechin City (h)	3–0
Second round	Montrose (a)	3–2 (a.e.t.)
Quarter-final	Queen of the South (h)	4–1
Semi-final	Clyde (h)	2–0

Ayr United entered the competition in the first round along with 23 other clubs from the First and Second Divisions; four clubs received random byes into the second round to even the number of fixtures. Ayr United's first match was against Brechin City and comfortably won 3–0 at Somerset Park. The club then faced Montrose away from home at Links Park. The score was level after 90 minutes but Ayr United scored to win 3–2 after extra time. With eight clubs left in the competition, Ayr United faced Queen of the South at home and won 4–1 to progress to the semi-finals where they won 2–0 against Clyde to earn a place in the final; the first national final in the club's history.

=== Dundee ===
Round	Opposition	Score
Second round	Alloa Athletic (a)	5–3
Quarter-final	Raith Rovers (a)	1–0 (a.e.t.)
Semi-final	Kilmarnock (a)	2–0

Dundee received a random bye in the first round to earn automatic qualification for the second round of the tournament without playing a match. The club's first encounter was against Alloa Athletic and resulted in a 5–3 win away from home in the second round. In the next round Dundee travelled to Stark's Park to face Raith Rovers. The score was 0–0 after 90 minutes but Dundee scored to win the match 1–0 after extra time to progress to the semi-finals. The match was against Kilmarnock at Rugby Park with a high attendance. Dundee won 2–0 to reach the final of the tournament; their first national final since losing the 1980 Scottish League Cup final to Dundee United.

== Match ==
=== Details ===
11 November 1990
14:30 GMT

Ayr United	2–3 (a.e.t.)	Dundee
McAllister 12'; Smyth 75'	Report	Dodds 52' (pen.), 72', 115'

Fir Park, Motherwell
Attendance: 11,506
Referee: Kenny Hope (Clarkston)

Ayr United	Dundee

GK	(Scotland) David Purdie
DF	(Scotland) David Kennedy
DF	(Scotland) David Smyth
DF	(Scotland) Ian McAllister
DF	(Scotland) Alan Gillespie
DF	(Scotland) Jim McCann
FW	(Scotland) Tommy Bryce
MF	(Scotland) Sammy Johnston
FW	(Scotland) Ally Graham
FW	(Scotland) Henry Templeton
FW	(Scotland) Peter Weir
Manager:
(Scotland) Ally MacLeod

GK	(Scotland) Tom Carson
DF	(Scotland) Alan Dinnie
DF	(Scotland) Rab Shannon
DF	(Scotland) Gordon Chisholm
DF	(England) Willie Jamieson
DF	(Scotland) Mark Craib
FW	(England) Colin West
DF	(Scotland) Stewart Forsyth
FW	(Scotland) Keith Wright
FW	(Scotland) Billy Dodds
MF	(Scotland) Gordon McLeod
Manager:
(Scotland) Gordon Wallace

Match rules

- 90 minutes.
- 30 minutes of extra-time if necessary.
- Penalty shoot-out if scores still level.
