= James Boag =

James Boag may refer to:

- James Boag I (c.1804–1890), Australian businessman, founder and proprietor of J. Boag & Sons, owner of Boag's Brewery
- James Boag II (1854–1919), Australian businessman, his son, co-proprietor of J. Boag & Sons
