= Andy Millen =

Scottish footballer (born 1965)

Personal information
- Full name: Andrew Frank Millen
- Date of birth: 10 June 1965 (age 61)
- Place of birth: Glasgow, Scotland
- Position: Defender

Team information
- Current team: Raith Rovers (assistant manager)

Senior career*
Years	Team	Apps	(Gls)
1986–1987	St Johnstone	71	(2)
1987–1990	Alloa Athletic	111	(9)
1990–1993	Hamilton Academical	119	(4)
1993–1995	Kilmarnock	57	(0)
1995	→ Ipswich Town (loan)	0	(0)
1995–1997	Hibernian	51	(0)
1997	Raith Rovers	18	(0)
1997	→ Ayr United (loan)	3	(1)
1997–1999	Ayr United	57	(2)
1999–2001	Greenock Morton	44	(0)
2001–2004	Clyde	89	(11)
2004–2008	St Mirren	114	(1)
2011	Queen's Park	19	(0)
Total		753	(30)

International career
1994	Scotland B	1	(0)

Managerial career
- 2014–2015: Ayr United (caretaker)
- * Club domestic league appearances and goals

Andrew Frank Millen (born 10 June 1965) is a Scottish professional football coach and former player. He was the assistant manager of Greenock Morton.

During his career, which lasted from 1986 to 2011, Millen played primarily as a defender for St Johnstone, Alloa Athletic, Hamilton Academical, Kilmarnock, Hibernian, Raith Rovers, Ayr United, Greenock Morton and Clyde.

He continued to play for St Mirren in the Scottish Premier League aged 42. Millen played for Queen's Park in the Scottish Third Division, aged 45.

== Career ==
Millen was born in Glasgow. Early in his playing career, he won the Scottish Challenge Cup twice with Hamilton. During his spell with Kilmarnock he won a Scotland B cap against Wales B.

Millen earned fame later in his career for continuing to play at a senior level despite his advanced professional age. When he played for St Mirren against Dundee United on 5 May 2007 at Tannadice, he became the oldest player to play in the Scottish Premier League. He broke the record set by Aberdeen goalkeeper Jim Leighton, who was aged 41 years and 302 days when he last played in the SPL. Gus MacPherson argued that Millen's record is more notable because Millen played in the more physical role of an outfield player.

Millen took control of the St Mirren team for a match against Motherwell in November 2007, after a family bereavement prevented Gus MacPherson from attending the match, which ended in a 1–1 draw.

Millen announced his intention to retire from first team football in June 2008. During his time with St Mirren, he won the Scottish Challenge Cup and the Scottish First Division in the 2005–06 season. Millen's last league appearance was against Hearts on 15 March 2008, which meant that he set the SPL record for oldest player at 42 years and 279 days, almost a whole year more than the previous record.

Millen continued working as assistant manager to Gus MacPherson after retiring as a player. After Danny Lennon was appointed as manager, however, Millen left the club to allow Lennon to appoint his own backroom staff.

Millen was appointed as Billy Reid's new assistant at Hamilton Academical in July 2010. He left the club in December due to a contract dispute.

Due to an injury to James Brough, Millen re-registered as a player to sign for amateurs Queen's Park in January 2011.

Millen was appointed assistant manager of Queen of the South on his 46th birthday on 10 June 2011. Millen parted company with Queens on 30 April 2012, alongside MacPherson, after the club was relegated to the Scottish Second Division. He then became assistant to Mark Roberts at Ayr United and was appointed caretaker manager in December 2014, after Roberts was sacked.

Millen was appointed Development Squad Manager at Greenock Morton in May 2015. He left the club in May 2017 to take any opportunity elsewhere. It was announced that he had taken over the development squad manager's role at Kilmarnock. He then became assistant manager to Alex Dyer, but left Kilmarnock in February 2021 after Tommy Wright was appointed manager.

In March 2021, Millen returned to Greenock Morton as assistant manager under his ex-manager at St Mirren, Gus MacPherson.

== Managerial statistics ==
As of 23 May 2017

Team	Nat	From	To	Record				
Team	Nat	From	To	G	W	D	L	Win %
Ayr United (caretaker)	(Scotland)	December 2014	January 2015	3	0	1	2	0.00

== Honours ==
=== Player ===
Hamilton Academical

- Scottish Challenge Cup: 1991–92, 1992–93

St Mirren

- Scottish Challenge Cup: 2005–06
- Scottish First Division: 2005–06
- Renfrewshire Cup: 2006–07, 2007–08

=== Manager ===
Greenock Morton

- SPFL Development League West: 2015–16

== See also ==
- List of footballers in Scotland by number of league appearances (500+)
