= Mike McAnenay =

Scottish footballer

Personal information
- Full name: Michael Samuel McAnenay
- Date of birth: 16 September 1966 (age 60)
- Place of birth: Glasgow, Scotland
- Position: Midfielder

Senior career*
Years	Team	Apps	(Gls)
1989–1992	Albion Rovers	74	(21)
1990	Ottawa Intrepid	17	(4)
1991–1992	Hamilton Academical	8	(1)
1992–1994	Dumbarton	39	(6)
1993–1997	Alloa Athletic	70	(10)
- * Club domestic league appearances and goals

Michael Samuel McAnenay (born 16 September 1966) is a Scottish former footballer, who played for Albion Rovers, Ottawa Intrepid, Hamilton Academical, Dumbarton and Alloa Athletic.
