= Brian McGinlay =

Scottish football referee (born 1945)

Brian McGinlay (born 24 August 1945) is a retired football referee from Scotland, who officiated in 98 European club competition and international matches.

== Refereeing career ==
At the domestic level McGinlay has refereed 21 Old Firm derbies, during which he never sent off a player, but he considers his most nerve-racking match to be the Rangers–Aberdeen title decider match at the climax of the 1990–91 season. In European club football he judged his most exciting match to be the Real Madrid–Borussia Mönchengladbach third-round second-leg UEFA Cup match. In international football he has taken charge of matches at the 1980 European Championships, the Home Championship and the 1984 Summer Olympics. He was placed on the referees' list for the 1986 World Cup but was later removed after being struck off the SFA list for personal reasons.

== Personal life ==
In 1991 McGinlay was banned from driving for a year and fined £250 for failing to provide a sample when stopped on his way home from the Scottish Cup Final.

== Retirement ==
Since retirement as a referee McGinlay has been a director of Stenhousemuir Football Club, an after-dinner speaker, and a columnist for the Daily Mirror, the Daily Record and the Sunday Mail.
