= Kenny Ward =

Scottish footballer (born 1963)

Personal information
- Full name: Kenneth Ward
- Date of birth: 16 August 1963 (age 63)
- Place of birth: Blairhall, Scotland
- Position: Winger

Senior career*
Years	Team	Apps	(Gls)
–1983	Oakley United		
1983–1986	Cowdenbeath	83	(29)
1986–1989	Forfar Athletic	119	(24)
1989–1992	St Johnstone	40	(6)
1992–1994	Hamilton Academical	75	(23)
1994–1995	Dunfermline Athletic	23	(4)
1997	Falkirk	12	(1)
1997–1998	Clydebank	23	(1)
- Oakley United
- * Club domestic league appearances and goals

Kenneth Ward (born 16 August 1963) is a former Scottish footballer who made over 370 appearances as a winger in the Scottish League for Cowdenbeath, Forfar Athletic, St Johnstone, Hamilton Academical, Dunfermline Athletic, Falkirk, and Clydebank. He is a member of the Cowdenbeath Hall of Fame.

== Career statistics ==
Appearances and goals by club, season and competition
Club	Season	League			Scottish Cup		League Cup		Other		Total	
Club	Season	Division	Apps	Goals	Apps	Goals	Apps	Goals	Apps	Goals	Apps	Goals
Forfar Athletic	1985–86	Scottish First Division	14	1	0	0	0	0	—		14	1
Forfar Athletic	1986–87	Scottish First Division	33	4	4	1	2	0	—		39	5
Forfar Athletic	1987–88	Scottish First Division	35	7	2	0	1	0	—		38	7
Forfar Athletic	1988–89	Scottish First Division	35	12	2	1	0	0	—		37	13
Forfar Athletic	1989–90	Scottish First Division	2	0	—		0	0	—		2	0
Forfar Athletic	Total		119	24	8	2	3	0	—		130	26
Hamilton Academical	1991–92	Scottish First Division	12	5	—		—		0	0	12	5
Hamilton Academical	1992–93	Scottish First Division	33	10	1	0	1	0	4 (Note: Appearances in Scottish Challenge Cup)	0	31	10
Hamilton Academical	1993–94	Scottish First Division	30	8	0	0	1	0	1	0	26	8
Hamilton Academical	Total		75	23	1	0	2	0	5	0	83	23
Falkirk	1996–97	Scottish First Division	1	1	1	0	—		—		2	1
Falkirk	1997–98	Scottish First Division	2	0	—		0	0	1	0	3	0
Falkirk	Total		3	1	1	0	0	0	1	0	5	1
Clydebank	1997–98	Scottish Second Division	23	1	2	1	—		—		25	1
Career total			220	49	12	3	5	0	6	0	243	52

== Honours ==
St Johnstone

- Scottish League First Division: 1989–90

Hamilton Academical

- Scottish Challenge Cup: 1992–93

Clydebank

- Scottish League Second Division second-place promotion: 1997–98

Individual

- Cowdenbeath Hall of Fame
