= Mike Monaghan =

Scottish footballer

Personal information
- Full name: Michael Joseph Monaghan
- Date of birth: 28 June 1963 (age 63)
- Place of birth: Glasgow, Scotland
- Date of death: 14 January 2020
- Place of death: QEUH, GLASGOW
- Position: Goalkeeper

Youth career
- John Brown Engineering Welfare

Senior career*
Years	Team	Apps	(Gls)
1987–1991	Queen's Park	126	(0)
1991–1992	Hamilton Academical	13	(0)
1992–1994	Dumbarton	4	(0)
1993–1997	Stirling Albion	19	(0)
1996–1998	Alloa Athletic	22	(0)
1998–1999	Queen's Park	2	(0)
- * Club domestic league appearances and goals

Michael Joseph Monaghan (28 June 1963 – 15 January 2020) was a Scottish footballer, who played for Queen's Park, Hamilton Academical, Dumbarton, Stirling Albion and Alloa Athletic.
