= 1991–92 Scottish Challenge Cup =

1991–92 B&Q Cup
Tournament details
- Country: Scotland
- Teams: 26

Final positions
- Champions: Hamilton Academical
- Runners-up: Ayr United

Tournament statistics
- Matches played: 25
- Goals scored: 101 (4.04 per match)

The 1991–92 Scottish Challenge Cup was the second season of the competition, which was also known as the B&Q Cup for sponsorship reasons. It was competed for by the 26 clubs in the Scottish Football League Division One and Two. The defending champions were Dundee, who defeated Ayr United 3–2 after extra time in the 1990 final; and lost 2–0 in the First Round to Ayr United.

The final was played on 8 December 1991, between Ayr United and Hamilton Academical at Fir Park, Motherwell. Hamilton Academical won 1–0, to win the tournament for the first time.

== Schedule ==
Round	First match date	Fixtures	Clubs
First round	Tue/Wed 1/2 August 1991	10	26 → 16
Second round	Tuesday 15 October 1991	8	16 → 8
Quarter-finals	Tuesday 22 October 1991	4	8 → 4
Semi-finals	Tuesday 5 November 1991	2	4 → 2
Final	Sunday 8 December 1991	1	2 → 1

== First round ==
Kilmarnock, Morton, Queen of the South, Queen's Park, Raith Rovers and Stirling Albion entered the second round.

1 October 1991	Berwick Rangers	3–2	East Stirlingshire	Shielfield Park, Berwick-upon-Tweed

1 October 1991	Brechin City	2–4	Albion Rovers	Glebe Park, Brechin

1 October 1991	Clydebank	4–0	Clyde	Firhill Stadium, Glasgow

1 October 1991	Cowdenbeath	2 – 3 (a.e.t.)	Partick Thistle	Central Park, Cowdenbeath

1 October 1991	Dundee	0–2	Ayr United	Dens Park, Dundee

1 October 1991	Forfar Athletic	2 – 2* (a.e.t.)	Stranraer	Station Park, Forfar
			Stranraer won on penalties

1 October 1991	Hamilton Academical	5–1	Alloa Athletic	Douglas Park, Hamilton

1 October 1991	Montrose	2–1	Dumbarton	Links Park, Montrose

1 October 1991	Stenhousemuir	3–2	Arbroath	Ochilview Park, Stenhousemuir

2 October 1991	Meadowbank Thistle	1–2	East Fife	Meadowbank Stadium, Edinburgh

Source: SFL

== Second round ==
15 October 1991	Clydebank	1 – 1* (a.e.t.)	Raith Rovers
			Raith Rovers won on penalties

15 October 1991	Montrose	2–1	Albion Rovers	Links Park, Montrose

15 October 1991	Morton	2 – 1 (a.e.t.)	Kilmarnock	Cappielow, Greenock

15 October 1991	Partick Thistle	1–2	Hamilton Academical	Firhill Stadium, Glasgow

15 October 1991	Queen of the South	3* – 3 (a.e.t.)	Stirling Albion	Palmerston Park, Dumfries
	Queen of the South won on penalties

15 October 1991	Queen's Park	1 – 2 (a.e.t.)	East Fife	Hampden Park, Glasgow

15 October 1991	Stenhousemuir	0–2	Ayr United	Ochilview Park, Stenhousemuir

15 October 1991	Stranraer	3–1	Berwick Rangers	Stair Park, Stranraer

Source: SFL

== Quarter-finals ==
22 October 1991

Ayr United	2–0	Stranraer

Somerset Park, Ayr

22 October 1991

East Fife	2–3	Hamilton Academical

Bayview Park, Methil

22 October 1991

Montrose	4 – 7 (a.e.t.)	Queen of the South

Links Park, Montrose

22 October 1991

Morton	2–3	Raith Rovers

Cappielow, Greenock

== Semi-finals ==
5 November 1991

Ayr United	3–2	Queen of the South

Somerset Park, Ayr

5 November 1991

Hamilton Academical	2–1	Raith Rovers

Douglas Park, Hamilton

== Final ==
8 December 1991
15:00

Ayr United	0–1	Hamilton Academical
	Report	Harris

Fir Park, Motherwell
Attendance: 9,663
Referee: Les Mottram
