= Paul MacLean =

Paul MacLean or Paul McLean may refer to:

- Paul D. MacLean (1913–2007), doctor and scientist who did extensive research on the human brain
- Paul McLean (politician) (born 1937), Australian advocate of banking reform and senator for New South Wales, 1987–1991
- Paul McLean (rugby union) (born 1953), Australian rugby union player and administrator
- Paul MacLean (ice hockey) (born 1958), former professional ice hockey player and former head coach of the Ottawa Senators
- Paul McLean (footballer, born 1964), Scottish footballer
- Paul McLean (footballer, born 1990), Scottish footballer who plays for Cowdenbeath
- Paul McLean (Australian footballer) (born 1965), Australian footballer for Fitzroy
- Paul Maclean, younger brother to Norman Maclean
