= John Boag =

John Boag may refer to:

- John Boag (footballer, born 1874) (1874–1954), Scottish football centre forward
- John Boag (footballer, born 1965) (1965–2006), Scottish football defender
- John Boag (writer) (1775–1863), Scottish evangelist, pastor, and lexicographer
