= 1990–91 Scottish Challenge Cup =

1990–91 B&Q Centenary Cup
Tournament details
- Country: Scotland
- Teams: 28

Final positions
- Champions: Dundee
- Runners-up: Ayr United

Tournament statistics
- Matches played: 27
- Goals scored: 91 (3.37 per match)

The 1990–91 Scottish Challenge Cup was the inaugural season of the competition, which was also known as the B&Q Centenary Cup for sponsorship reasons. It was competed for by the 28 member clubs of the Scottish Football League Division One and Two.

The final was played on 11 November 1990, between Ayr United and Dundee at Fir Park in Motherwell. Dundee won 3–2 after extra time to become the first winners of the cup.

== Schedule ==
Round	First match date	Fixtures	Clubs
First round	Tuesday 2 October 1990	12	28 → 16
Second round	Tuesday 16 October 1990	8	16 → 8
Quarter-finals	Tuesday 23 October 1990	4	8 → 4
Semi-finals	Tuesday 30 October 1990	2	4 → 2
Final	Sunday 11 November 1990	1	2 → 1

== First round ==
Dundee, East Stirlingshire, Hamilton Academical and Stranraer entered the second round.

2 October 1990	Airdrieonians (2)	2 – 1 (a.e.t.)	Partick Thistle (2)	Broomfield Park, Airdrie

2 October 1990	Alloa Athletic (3)	3–0	Forfar Athletic (2)	Recreation Park, Alloa

2 October 1990	Arbroath (3)	2 – 1 (a.e.t.)	Queen's Park (3)	Gayfield Park, Arbroath

2 October 1990	Ayr United (2)	3–0	Brechin City (2)	Somerset Park, Ayr

2 October 1990	Clyde (2)	4–3	Dumbarton (3)	Firhill Stadium, Glasgow

2 October 1990	Clydebank (2)	1–2	East Fife (3)	Kilbowie Park, Clydebank

2 October 1990	Cowdenbeath (3)	2–1	Albion Rovers (3)	Central Park, Cowdenbeath

2 October 1990	Falkirk (2)	0–3	Raith Rovers (2)	Brockville Park, Falkirk

2 October 1990	Kilmarnock (2)	4–1	Stirling Albion (3)	Rugby Park, Kilmarnock

2 October 1990	Meadowbank Thistle (2)	1 – 2 (a.e.t.)	Morton (2)	Meadowbank Stadium, Edinburgh

2 October 1990	Montrose (3)	2–0	Berwick Rangers (3)	Links Park, Montrose

2 October 1990	Stenhousemuir (3)	0* – 0 (a.e.t.)	Queen of the South (3)	Ochilview Park, Stenhousemuir
	Stenhousemuir won on penalties

Source: statto.com

== Second round ==
16 October 1990	Airdrieonians (2)	0–2	Clyde (2)	Broomfield Park, Airdrie

16 October 1990	Alloa Athletic (3)	3–5	Dundee (2)	Recreation Park, Alloa

16 October 1990	East Fife (3)	2–1	Stranraer (3)	Bayview Park, Methil

16 October 1990	Kilmarnock (2)	3–1	Arbroath (3)	Rugby Park, Kilmarnock

16 October 1990	Montrose (3)	2 – 3 (a.e.t.)	Ayr United (2)	Links Park, Montrose

16 October 1990	Morton (2)	0 – 0* (a.e.t.)	Cowdenbeath (3)	Cappielow, Greenock
			Cowdenbeath won 8-7 on penalties

16 October 1990	Queen of the South (3)	5–0	East Stirlingshire (3)	Palmerston Park, Dumfries

16 October 1990	Raith Rovers (2)	3–2	Hamilton Academical (2)	Stark's Park, Kirkcaldy

Source: statto.com

== Quarter-finals ==
23 October 1990	Ayr United (2)	4–1	Queen of the South (3)	Somerset Park, Ayr

23 October 1990	Clyde (2)	2–1	Cowdenbeath (3)	Firhill Stadium, Glasgow

23 October 1990	East Fife (3)	1–2	Kilmarnock (2)	Bayview Park, Methil

23 October 1990	Raith Rovers (2)	0 – 1 (a.e.t.)	Dundee (2)	Stark's Park, Kirkcaldy

== Semi-finals ==
30 October 1990	Ayr United (2)	2–0	Clyde (2)	Somerset Park, Ayr

30 October 1990	Kilmarnock (2)	0–2	Dundee (2)	Rugby Park, Kilmarnock

== Final ==
11 November 1990

Ayr United (2)	2 – 3 (a.e.t.)	Dundee (2)
D Smyth; I McAllister	Report	W Dodds,,

Fir Park, Motherwell
Attendance: 11,506
Referee: Kenny Hope
