= James Marsland =

James Marsland may refer to:

- James Hype (real name James Marsland; born 1989), English DJ, producer, and remix artist
- Jim Marsland (born 1968), Scottish former footballer
