= Tony Speirs =

Scottish footballer

Personal information
- Full name: Anthony Speirs
- Date of birth: 1 May 1968 (age 58)
- Place of birth: Paisley, Scotland
- Position: Midfielder

Senior career*
Years	Team	Apps	(Gls)
1988–1992	Stenhousemuir	77	(30)
1991–1993	East Fife	17	(0)
1992–1993	Dumbarton	1	(0)
1993–1994	East Stirlingshire	7	(1)
- * Club domestic league appearances and goals

Anthony Speirs (born 1 May 1968) is a Scottish footballer who played for Stenhousemuir, East Fife, Dumbarton and East Stirlingshire.
