= Ray Sharp =

Scottish footballer

Personal information
- Full name: Raymond Sharp
- Date of birth: 16 November 1969 (age 56)
- Place of birth: Stirling, Scotland
- Position: Left-back

Youth career
- Gairdoch United

Senior career*
Years	Team	Apps	(Gls)
1988–1995	Dunfermline Athletic	150	(1)
1989	→ Stenhousemuir (loan)	5	(0)
1995–1996	Preston North End	22	(0)
1996–1998	Dunfermline Athletic	18	(0)
1998–1999	Forfar Athletic	9	(0)
1999–2000	Alloa Athletic	8	(0)
2000	→ Cowdenbeath (loan)	5	(0)
2000–2001	East Fife	38	(2)
2001–2002	Montrose	25	(2)
- Oakley United
Total		280	(5)

International career
1989–1990	Scotland U21	4	(0)
- * Club domestic league appearances and goals

Raymond Sharp (born 16 November 1969) is a Scottish former footballer who played for Dunfermline Athletic, Stenhousemuir, Preston North End, Forfar Athletic, Alloa Athletic, Cowdenbeath, East Fife and Montrose.

Sharp made four appearances for the Scotland national under-21 football team.
