= Colin McNair =

Scottish footballer

Personal information
- Full name: Colin John McNair
- Date of birth: 20 March 1969 (age 57)
- Place of birth: Glasgow
- Position: Centre half

Youth career
- Bishopbriggs BC

Senior career*
Years	Team	Apps	(Gls)
1987–1990	Falkirk	46	(4)
1989–1990	Motherwell	1	(1)
1990–1992	Dumbarton	26	(2)
- * Club domestic league appearances and goals

Colin John McNair (born 20 March 1969) is a Scottish former footballer who played for Falkirk, Motherwell and Dumbarton.

McNair had a 25-year struggle with drug addiction, that led him to lose his career, home and spend time in prison. He later volunteered with Hamilton Academical to help people in similar situations.
