= Gary Clark (footballer) =

Scottish footballer (born 1964)

Personal information
- Date of birth: 13 September 1964 (age 62)
- Place of birth: Glasgow, Scotland
- Height: 5 ft 10 in (1.78 m)
- Position: Midfielder

Youth career
- 1984–1985: Pollok

Senior career*
Years	Team	Apps	(Gls)
1985–1987	Falkirk	12	(2)
1987–1988	Sunshine George Cross	39	(13)
1988–1989	Sliema Wanderers	12	(1)
1989–1990	Albion Rovers	21	(10)
1990–1991	Clyde	39	(12)
1991–1999	Hamilton Academical	258	(72)
1999–2000	Alloa Athletic	32	(4)
2001–2002	Hamilton Academical	20	(2)
Total		401	(114)
- * Club domestic league appearances and goals as of 31 March 2001

Gary Clark (born 13 September 1964) is a Scottish former professional footballer who played as a midfielder.

== Career ==
He played for Pollok Juniors in 1985 and won the League, Scottish Cup and Cup Winners Cup. He then joined Falkirk (apps 12 goals 2) in the Scottish 1st Division in 1986 the year they won promotion to the Scottish Premier League. Stayed there until the following season where he was freed and went to play for Sunshine George Cross (apps 39 goals 13) in Australia. He played in the National Soccer League until November 1988, moved back to Scotland and then played for Sliema Wanderers for six months in Malta (apps 12 goals 1) Davie Provan signed for Albion Rovers (apps 21 goals 10) until the end of season May 1989. He was then signed by John Clark for Clyde, £10,000, (apps 26 goals 11) for the season 1989/90.

Billy McLaren paid £60,000 to take him to Hamilton Academical (apps 258 goals 72). During the 8 seasons with the 'Accies' he won 2 Challenge Cup Winners medals and played under the management of Iain Munro, Sandy Clark and Colin Miller. Terry Christie signed him for Alloa Athletic (apps 24 goals 5) for season 1999-2000 and the team went on to win promotion and the Challenge Cup. At the end of that season he left Alloa FC and Ally Dawson took him back to Hamilton Academicals, where they won the League, for his last season in senior football.

In his time with Hamilton he took Paul Hartley under his wing.

== Honours ==
=== Player ===
Hamilton Academical

- Scottish Challenge Cup 1991–92, 1992–93

Alloa Athletic

- Scottish Challenge Cup 1999–2000
