= Henry Templeton =

Scottish footballer (born 1963)

Personal information
- Date of birth: 25 June 1963 (age 63)
- Place of birth: Glasgow, Scotland
- Position: Winger

Senior career*
Years	Team	Apps	(Gls)
- Shettleston
1985–1987	Airdrieonians	63	(14)
1987–1991	Ayr United	124	(48)
1991	Clydebank	13	(2)
1991–1993	Queen of the South	35	(8)
- * Club domestic league appearances and goals

Henry Templeton (born 25 June 1963) is a Scottish former professional footballer. Templeton played as a winger for Airdrieonians, Ayr United, Clydebank, Queen of the South and Frickley Athletic.

He is the father of footballer David Templeton.

== Playing career ==
Templeton played most of his career at Ayr United. There, he formed part of an attacking trio alongside Tommy Walker and John Sludden. Led by ex-Scotland manager Ally MacLeod, in 1987–88 Ayr were Second Division champions and Scotland's highest league scorers. The start of Templeton's final season at Somerset Park was interrupted by an injury sustained in a Scottish League Cup defeat to Celtic in August 1990, though he recovered to take part in the 1990 Scottish Challenge Cup Final, only to finish on the losing side. In February 1991 he was sold on to Clydebank, staying for only six months before joining Queen of the South. In 2007, Templeton was inducted into the Ayr United Hall of Fame.

== Honours ==
Ayr United

- Scottish Second Division: 1987–88
