= Oakley United F.C. =

Association football club in Scotland

Oakley United
- Full name: Oakley United Football Club
- Founded: 1964
- Ground: Blairwood Park; Oakley
- Capacity: 2,000
- Coordinates: 56°5′15″N 3°34′21″W
- Manager: Alain Davidson
- League: East of Scotland League First Division
- 2025–26: East of Scotland League Second Division, 3rd of 15 (promoted)
- Website: https://www.clubwebsite.co.uk/oakleyunited/309234/Home
Home colours	Away colours

Oakley United Football Club are a Scottish football club based in Oakley, Fife. Formed in 1964, they play their home games at Blairwood Park. The club's colours are maroon and light blue.

The team plays in the East of Scotland Football League, having moved from the SJFA East Region South Division in 2018.

In season 2005–06, they won the Fife District championship to gain promotion to the East Superleague, having been relegated from the same division in season 2004–05. At the end of season 2006–07 they were relegated from the East Superleague.

The team has been managed since November 2018 by Stewart Kenny until he joined Hill o’beath in summer 2023.

== Honours ==
- East of Scotland League First Division Conference B: 2021–22
- East Region Fife / Central Division: 2005–06, 2010–11
- Fife & Lothians Cup: 1982–83
- Fife Junior League winners: 1971–72, 1978–79, 1979–80, 1982–83, 1985–86, 1987–88, 2000–01, 2005–06
- ACA Fife League Cup: 2005–06
- Fife Junior Cup: 1987–88, 2004–05, 2006–07
- Cowdenbeath Cup: 1970–71, 1982–83, 1995–96, 1998–99, 2001–02, 2003–04
- Kingdom Kegs Cup: 2000–01, 2004–05, 2006–07
- Stella Artois Cup: 2003–04

== Former players ==
1. Players that have played/managed in the top two tiers of the Scottish League or any foreign equivalent to this level (i.e. fully professional league).
2. Players with full international caps.
3. Players who have achieved success in the media or other professions.
- (Scotland) David Bingham
- (Scotland) George Connelly
- (Scotland) Cammy Fraser
- (Scotland) John Fraser
- (Scotland) Ernie McGarr
- (Scotland) Ray Sharp
- (Scotland) Kenny Ward
- (Scotland) Terry Wilson
- (Scotland) Bobby Graham
