= Ian McAllister (footballer) =

Scottish footballer

Personal information
- Date of birth: 8 February 1960 (age 66)
- Place of birth: Irvine, Scotland
- Position: Central defender

Senior career*
Years	Team	Apps	(Gls)
1977–1992	Ayr United	405	(35)
- * Club domestic league appearances and goals

Ian McAllister (born 8 February 1960) is a Scottish former professional footballer who spent his entire professional career with Ayr United, making 405 appearances in the Scottish Football League.
