= Colin West (footballer, born 1967) =

English footballer

Personal information
- Full name: Colin William West
- Date of birth: 19 September 1967 (age 59)
- Place of birth: Middlesbrough, England
- Height: 5 ft 7 in (1.70 m)
- Position: Winger

Youth career
- 1983–1986: Chelsea

Senior career*
Years	Team	Apps	(Gls)
1986–1990	Chelsea	16	(4)
1986–1987	→ Partick Thistle (loan)	24	(10)
1988–1989	→ Swansea City (loan)	14	(3)
1990–1993	Dundee	35	(6)
1993–1994	Hartlepool United	36	(5)
- Bishop Auckland

International career
1985	England U17	3	(0)
- * Club domestic league appearances and goals

Colin William West (born 19 September 1967) is an English former footballer who played as a winger.

== Career ==
Born in Middlesbrough, he began as an apprentice at Chelsea, scoring the winning goal against local rivals Arsenal on his first-team debut in March 1987 in the First Division campaign, aged 19. He had spent most of that season on loan at Scottish second-tier club Partick Thistle. In 1987–88 he remained at Chelsea but did not become a regular in the side, and was loaned to Third Division Swansea City during the next.

In 1990, West left Chelsea and signed for Dundee, helping them to win the Scottish Challenge Cup in 1990 and achieve promotion to the Scottish Premier Division in 1991–92 alongside former Chelsea colleague Billy Dodds, although they were relegated the next year. West then moved on, returning to his native North East England to play for Hartlepool United, where he was a regular but experienced another relegation, this time from the 'new' Second Division. He then dropped down to the Northern Premier League with local side Bishop Auckland.

== Honours ==
Dundee

- Scottish Challenge Cup:1990–91
- Scottish First Division: 1991–92
