= David Smyth (footballer) =

Scottish footballer

Personal information
- Full name: David Smyth
- Date of birth: 1913 or 1914
- Place of birth: Clydebank, Scotland
- Height: 5 ft 8 in (1.73 m)
- Position: Centre forward

Senior career*
Years	Team	Apps	(Gls)
19??–1935	Maryhill		
1935	Petershill		
1935–1936	Aston Villa	0	(0)
1936–1937	Newcastle United	0	(0)
1937–1938	Darlington	19	(6)
- * Club domestic league appearances and goals

David Smyth (1913 or 1914 – after 1937) was a Scottish footballer who played as a centre forward in the Football League for Darlington. He played for Scottish junior clubs Maryhill and Petershill, and was on the books of Aston Villa and Newcastle United in England without playing first-team football for either.

== Football career ==
Smyth was born in Clydebank, Scotland. He played football as a centre forward for Glasgow-based junior club Maryhill, but was not retained at the end of the 1934–35 season, and moved on to nearby Petershill. In November 1922, amid interest from Scottish Division One club St Johnstone, he was reported to have "flung up a good job in Glasgow" to make a career in English football with First Division club Aston Villa. The Dundee Courier understood that Petershill "[had] come out of the deal handsomely".

He played for Villa's "A" team in the Birmingham Combination, but not for the first team, and soon moved on to Second Division Newcastle United. He played for the club's reserve team, but again, not for the first team, and was listed for transfer at the end of the 1936–37 season. Smyth signed for Third Division North club Darlington in August 1937, and finally made his senior debut. By 26 October, he already had five league goals, and he finished the season, and his Darlington career, with six goals from 19 appearances in the Football League.
