= Willie Furphy =

Scottish footballer

Personal information
- Full name: William Furphy
- Date of birth: 7 May 1966 (age 60)
- Place of birth: London, England
- Position: Centre-half

Senior career*
Years	Team	Apps	(Gls)
1986–1993	Ayr United	210	(1)
1992–1993	→ Kilmarnock (loan)	1	(0)
1992–1993	→ Montrose (loan)	1	(0)
1992–1993	→ Dumbarton (loan)	1	(0)
1994–1999	Ross County	103	(3)
1999–2000	Stranraer	16	(0)
2000–2002	Elgin City	30	(0)
- * Club domestic league appearances and goals

William Furphy (born 7 May 1966) was an English footballer. Although born in London he played all of his professional career in Scotland - with Ayr United, Kilmarnock, Montrose, Dumbarton, Ross County, Stranraer and Elgin City. Following his retiral from playing he took up the assistant manager's post at Elgin City.
