= Andrew Wylie (footballer) =

English football manager

Managerial career
- Years: Team
- 1926–1931: Reading Football Club
- 1931–?: Guildford City F. C.

Andrew Wylie was the manager of Reading Football Club, England between 1926 and 1931.

Wylie resigned as Reading manager in 1931, after being appointed manager of Guildford.
