= Dougie Johnstone =

Scottish footballer (born 1957)

Personal information
- Full name: Douglas Iain Johnstone
- Date of birth: 12 March 1969 (age 57)
- Place of birth: Irvine, North Ayrshire, Scotland
- Height: 1.91 m (6 ft 3 in)
- Position: Centre-back

College career
Years	Team	Apps	(Gls)
–1991	University of Glasgow		

Senior career*
Years	Team	Apps	(Gls)
1991–1997	Greenock Morton	138	(10)
1997–2002	Stranraer	10	(5)
2002–200?	Glenafton Athletic		
Total		148	(15)
- * Club domestic league appearances and goals

Douglas Johnstone (born 12 March 1969 in Irvine, North Ayrshire) is a Scottish footballer. He played professionally as a central defender before retiring and becoming a teacher at various schools around North Ayrshire, including the now demolished St Matthews Academy in Saltcoats. He teaches Mathematics up to an Advanced Higher level and is qualified to teach Computing.

He most famously played for Greenock Morton, before joining the later-to-become Morton players Kevin Finlayson, Allan Jenkins and failed trialist Derek Wingate at Stranraer.
