= John Boag (writer) =

John Boag (1775–1863) was an evangelist, pastor, and lexicographer, who compiled the 'Imperial Lexicon'.

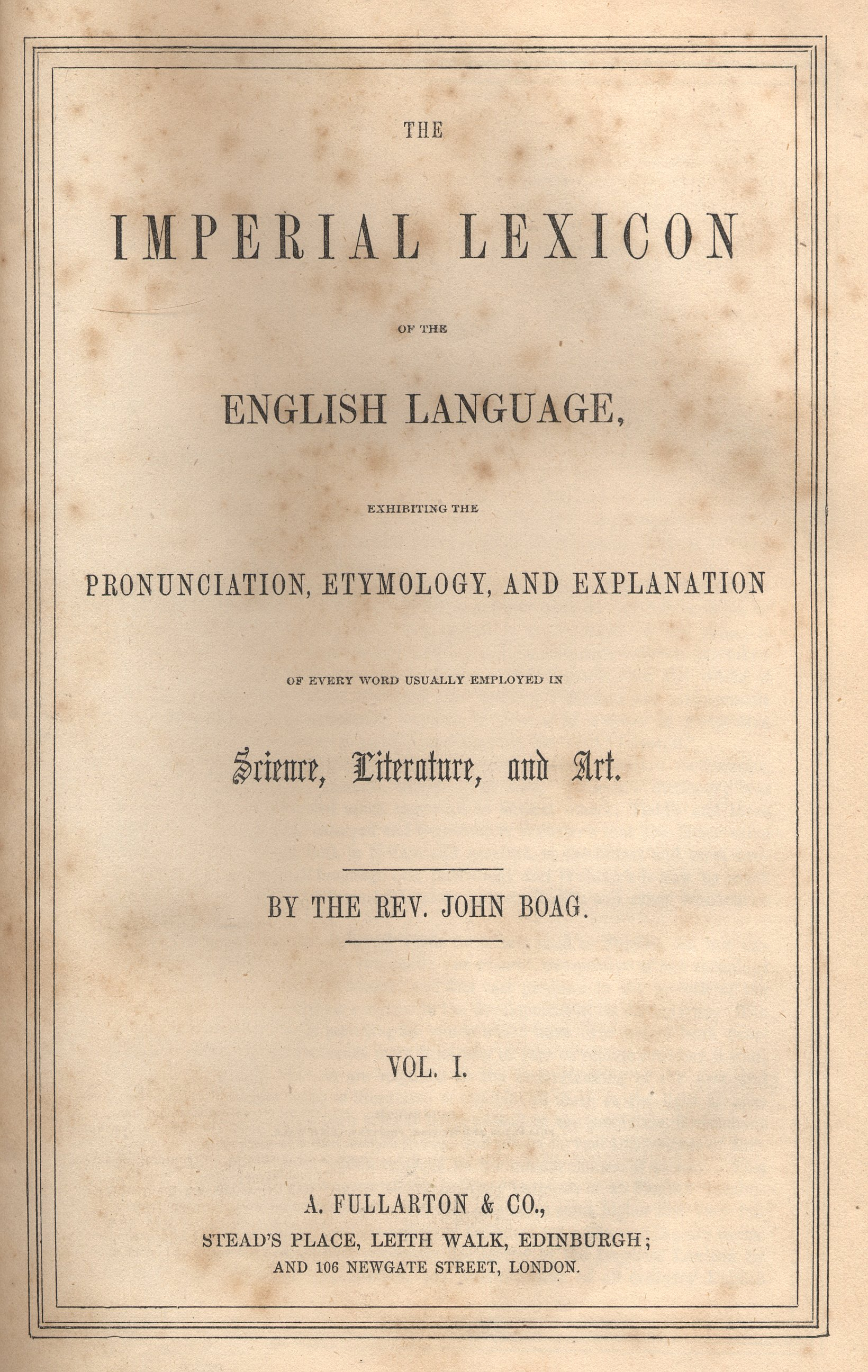
Title page of The Imperial Lexicon of the English Language, by the Rev. John Boag, published A. Fullerton & Co., Edinburgh c. 1852 (Vol. 1)

Boag was born at Highgate in the parish of Beith, Ayrshire, on 7 January 1775. He matriculated at the University of Glasgow in 1797, and completed his academical course with a view to taking orders in the Church of Scotland, but joined the body of independents or congregationalists, who in 1812 formed themselves into the Congregational Union of Scotland. He acted for many years as an evangelist, and not infrequently in the open air or by the wayside. He had small charges in the Isle of Man and Helensburgh. Ultimately he accepted the appointment of pastor over a very small independent congregation in the village of Blackburn, Linlithgowshire, from which, it is believed, he never received more than 25 to 30 pounds a year. He also kept a day-school on his own account. It was in this humble position that Boag compiled his magnum opus. His aim was to combine etymology, pronunciation, and explanation of scientific terms and others used in art and literature. He wished also to incorporate (1) new words since Johnson, and (2) modifications and other changes of meanings. He commenced this arduous undertaking after he had entered his seventieth year. Within three years his manuscript was ready for the press. It was printed and published by the Edinburgh Printing and Publishing Company. Unfortunately this company speedily became bankrupt. About 1847 Messrs. Fullarton & Co. became proprietors of the 'Imperial Lexicon', and issued it in parts or numbers, constituting two massive volumes. The work had an enormous sale and held its own until the publication of Ogilvie's Dictionary, which was largely based upon it. Prefixed was a 'Popular Grammar of the English Language,' by Mr. R. Whyte. Besides his 'Imperial Lexicon,' Boag was the author of a number of pamphlets on questions of the day, and was a frequent contributor to contemporary religious periodicals.

== Family life ==
He married Agnes Hamilton on 19 June 1798, by whom he had six sons and three daughters. One of his sons was Sir Robert Boag, mayor of Belfast in 1876. John Boag died at Craigton House, Linlithgowshire—the residence of a daughter-in-law, with whom he had resided in his later years—on 15 September 1863, at the age of 89.
