= Stuart Boag =

Stuart Boag may refer to:

- Stuart Boag, New Zealand National Party candidate and president of the Young Nationals
- Stuart Boag, 1998 actor of Elf in The Fairies
