= Joe Timmons (referee) =

Scottish/English football referee

- Full name: Joe Timmons
- Born: 1952 (age 73–74); Scotland
- Other occupation: Bank manager

Domestic
Years	League	Role
early 1980s–1986	Scottish Football League	Referee
1986–1989	English Football League	Referee
1989–late 1990s	Scottish Football League	Referee

International
Years	League	Role
1990s	FIFA	Referee

Joe Timmons is a Scottish former football referee, who officiated in both the Scottish and English leagues. Born in 1952, he started off as a Scottish League official in the early 1980s before moving to Newcastle in England in his work as a bank manager. After one season as a linesman (1986–87) he was promoted to the middle and refereed for the next two seasons in the English Football League. He then moved back to Scotland (Kilwinning), and back to the Scottish referees list. Indeed, he made the Scottish FIFA panel of referees before leaving the list in the late 1990s.
