= Willie McAndrew =

Scottish footballer and manager

Personal information
- Full name: William McAndrew
- Date of birth: 3 September 1887
- Place of birth: Kirkintilloch, Scotland
- Date of death: 23 December 1965 (aged 78)
- Position: Half back

Senior career*
Years	Team	Apps	(Gls)
1907–1910	Queen's Park	105	(0)
1910–1920	Clyde	158	(0)
1920–1922	Third Lanark	57	(0)
1922–1923	Dundee Hibernian	0	(0)

International career
1911–1912	Scottish Football League XI	3	(0)

Managerial career
- 1923: Dundee Hibernian (caretaker)
- 1925–1946: Hamilton Academical
- 1947: Dunfermline Athletic
- * Club domestic league appearances and goals

William McAndrew (3 September 1887 – 23 December 1965) was a Scottish professional footballer and manager. He played for Queen's Park, Clyde, Third Lanark and Dundee Hibernian.

== Career ==
During his Clyde career, he played for the club in the 1912 Scottish Cup Final and represented the Scottish League three times. After a spell as caretaker player-manager while with Dundee Hibernian, McAndrew got his first permanent appointment as a manager with Hamilton Academical in 1925. He remained in the role for 21 years, taking the club to the 1935 Scottish Cup Final as well as a fourth place League finish in the same season. He briefly managed Dunfermline Athletic in 1947.

== Personal life ==
McAndrew served in the First World War as a lieutenant in the Glasgow Highlanders and was held as a prisoner of war.
