= Peter Boag =

Canadian academic

Peter T. Boag
- Education: Queen's University; McGill University
- Scientific career
- Fields: Molecular ecology; Conservation genetics
- Workplaces: Queen's University
- Doctoral advisor: Peter Grant
- Website: https://biology.queensu.ca/people/department/professors/p-t-boag/

Peter Boag FRSC is a professor emeritus of genetics at Queen's University. He specializes in molecular ecology. In 2001, he was elected as a Fellow of the Royal Society of Canada.
