= 1990–91 Scottish Second Division =

Scottish Second Division
- Season: 1990–91
- Champions: Stirling Albion
- Promoted: Stirling Albion; Montrose

The 1990–91 Scottish Second Division was won by Stirling Albion who, along with second placed Montrose, were promoted to the First Division. Arbroath finished bottom.

== Table ==
Pos	Team	Pld	W	D	L	GF	GA	GD	Pts	Promotion
1	Stirling Albion (C, P)	39	20	14	5	62	24	+38	54	Promotion to the First Division
2	Montrose (P)	39	20	6	13	54	34	+20	46	Promotion to the First Division
3	Cowdenbeath	39	18	9	12	64	50	+14	45	
4	Stenhousemuir	39	16	12	11	56	42	+14	44	
5	Queen's Park	39	17	8	14	48	42	+6	42	
6	Stranraer	39	19	4	16	62	58	+4	42	
7	Dumbarton	39	15	10	14	50	49	+1	40	
8	Berwick Rangers	39	15	10	14	51	57	−6	40	
9	Alloa Athletic	39	13	11	15	51	46	+5	37	
10	East Fife	39	14	9	16	57	65	−8	37	
11	Albion Rovers	39	11	13	15	48	63	−15	35	
12	Queen of the South	39	9	12	18	46	62	−16	30	
13	East Stirlingshire	39	9	11	19	36	72	−36	29	
14	Arbroath	39	7	11	21	39	60	−21	25	

Rules for classification: 1) points; 2) goal difference; 3) number of goals scored.
(C) Champions; (P) Promoted
