= John Boag (footballer, born 1965) =

Scottish footballer (1965–2006)

Personal information
- Date of birth: 14 February 1965
- Place of birth: Port Glasgow, Scotland
- Date of death: July 2006 (aged 40–41)
- Place of death: Port Glasgow, Scotland
- Position: Central defender

Youth career
- Port Glasgow Rangers
- Aberdeen

Senior career*
Years	Team	Apps	(Gls)
1984–1993	Morton	178	(2)
1993	Dumbarton	7	(1)
- * Club domestic league appearances and goals

John Boag (14 February 1965 – 2006) was a Scottish footballer who was captain of Greenock Morton.

== Playing career ==
Boag joined Morton from Aberdeen in 1984 and played for the club for nine years, until 1993. He played for Dumbarton in 1993 prior to retirement.

== Death ==
Boag was found dead in his flat in Port Glasgow in July 2006.
