= 1990–91 Scottish Football League =

Scottish football season

Statistics of the Scottish Football League in season 1990–91.

== Scottish Premier Division ==
| Pos | Team | Pld | W | D | L | GF | GA | GD | Pts | Qualification or relegation |
|---|---|---|---|---|---|---|---|---|---|---|
| 1 | Rangers (C) | 36 | 24 | 7 | 5 | 62 | 23 | +39 | 55 | Qualification for the European Cup first round |
| 2 | Aberdeen | 36 | 22 | 9 | 5 | 62 | 27 | +35 | 53 | Qualification for the UEFA Cup first round |
| 3 | Celtic | 36 | 17 | 7 | 12 | 52 | 38 | +14 | 41 | Qualification for the UEFA Cup first round |
| 4 | Dundee United | 36 | 17 | 7 | 12 | 41 | 29 | +12 | 41 | |
| 5 | Heart of Midlothian | 36 | 14 | 7 | 15 | 48 | 55 | −7 | 35 | |
| 6 | Motherwell | 36 | 12 | 9 | 15 | 51 | 50 | +1 | 33 | Qualification for the Cup Winners' Cup first round |
| 7 | St Johnstone | 36 | 11 | 9 | 16 | 41 | 54 | −13 | 31 | |
| 8 | Dunfermline Athletic | 36 | 8 | 11 | 17 | 38 | 61 | −23 | 27 | |
| 9 | Hibernian | 36 | 6 | 13 | 17 | 24 | 51 | −27 | 25 | |
| 10 | St Mirren | 36 | 5 | 9 | 22 | 28 | 59 | −31 | 19 | |

Source: Statto.com
Rules for classification: 1) points; 2) goal difference; 3) number of goals scored.
(C) Champions

== Scottish League Division One ==
| Pos | Team | Pld | W | D | L | GF | GA | GD | Pts | Promotion or relegation |
|---|---|---|---|---|---|---|---|---|---|---|
| 1 | Falkirk (C, P) | 39 | 21 | 12 | 6 | 70 | 35 | +35 | 54 | Promotion to the Premier Division |
| 2 | Airdrieonians (P) | 39 | 21 | 11 | 7 | 69 | 43 | +26 | 53 | Promotion to the Premier Division |
| 3 | Dundee | 39 | 22 | 8 | 9 | 59 | 33 | +26 | 52 | |
| 4 | Partick Thistle | 39 | 16 | 13 | 10 | 56 | 53 | +3 | 45 | |
| 5 | Kilmarnock | 39 | 15 | 13 | 11 | 58 | 48 | +10 | 43 | |
| 6 | Hamilton Academical | 39 | 16 | 10 | 13 | 50 | 41 | +9 | 42 | |
| 7 | Raith Rovers | 39 | 14 | 9 | 16 | 54 | 64 | −10 | 37 | |
| 8 | Clydebank | 39 | 13 | 10 | 16 | 65 | 70 | −5 | 36 | |
| 9 | Morton | 39 | 11 | 13 | 15 | 48 | 55 | −7 | 35 | |
| 10 | Forfar Athletic | 39 | 9 | 15 | 15 | 50 | 57 | −7 | 33 | |
| 11 | Meadowbank Thistle | 39 | 10 | 13 | 16 | 56 | 68 | −12 | 33 | |
| 12 | Ayr United | 39 | 10 | 12 | 17 | 47 | 59 | −12 | 32 | |
| 13 | Clyde (R) | 39 | 9 | 9 | 21 | 41 | 61 | −20 | 27 | Relegation to the Second Division |
| 14 | Brechin City (R) | 39 | 7 | 10 | 22 | 44 | 80 | −36 | 24 | Relegation to the Second Division |

Source: RSSSF and statto
Rules for classification: 1) points; 2) goal difference; 3) number of goals scored.
(C) Champions; (P) Promoted; (R) Relegated

== Scottish League Division Two ==
| Pos | Team | Pld | W | D | L | GF | GA | GD | Pts | Promotion |
|---|---|---|---|---|---|---|---|---|---|---|
| 1 | Stirling Albion (C, P) | 39 | 20 | 14 | 5 | 62 | 24 | +38 | 54 | Promotion to the First Division |
| 2 | Montrose (P) | 39 | 20 | 6 | 13 | 54 | 34 | +20 | 46 | Promotion to the First Division |
| 3 | Cowdenbeath | 39 | 18 | 9 | 12 | 64 | 50 | +14 | 45 | |
| 4 | Stenhousemuir | 39 | 16 | 12 | 11 | 56 | 42 | +14 | 44 | |
| 5 | Queen's Park | 39 | 17 | 8 | 14 | 48 | 42 | +6 | 42 | |
| 6 | Stranraer | 39 | 19 | 4 | 16 | 62 | 58 | +4 | 42 | |
| 7 | Dumbarton | 39 | 15 | 10 | 14 | 50 | 49 | +1 | 40 | |
| 8 | Berwick Rangers | 39 | 15 | 10 | 14 | 51 | 57 | −6 | 40 | |
| 9 | Alloa Athletic | 39 | 13 | 11 | 15 | 51 | 46 | +5 | 37 | |
| 10 | East Fife | 39 | 14 | 9 | 16 | 57 | 65 | −8 | 37 | |
| 11 | Albion Rovers | 39 | 11 | 13 | 15 | 48 | 63 | −15 | 35 | |
| 12 | Queen of the South | 39 | 9 | 12 | 18 | 46 | 62 | −16 | 30 | |
| 13 | East Stirlingshire | 39 | 9 | 11 | 19 | 36 | 72 | −36 | 29 | |
| 14 | Arbroath | 39 | 7 | 11 | 21 | 39 | 60 | −21 | 25 | |

Rules for classification: 1) points; 2) goal difference; 3) number of goals scored.
(C) Champions; (P) Promoted

== See also ==
- 1990–91 in Scottish football
