= Tommy Boag =

Australian rules footballer, born 1914

Personal information
- Full name: Thomas Benjamin Boag
- Born: 19 September 1914; Stawell, Victoria
- Died: 7 March 1977 (aged 62); Croydon, Victoria
- Original team: Canterbury
- Height: 182 cm (6 ft 0 in)
- Weight: 79 kg (174 lb)

Playing career^{1}
Years	Club	Games (Goals)
1935	Collingwood	1 (0)
- ^{1} Playing statistics correct to the end of 1935.

Thomas Benjamin Boag (19 September 1914 – 7 March 1977) was an Australian rules footballer who played with Collingwood in the Victorian Football League (VFL).
