= James Boag I =

Scottish businesspeople (1822 - 1890)

James Boag
- Born: 1822; Paisley, Scotland
- Died: Death year 1890 aged 68-69; Melbourne, Australia
- Children: 10 including James Boag II

James Boag I (c. 4 February 1822– 9 November 1890) was the founder and proprietor of J. Boag & Sons, owner of the Boag's Brewery in Launceston, Tasmania, Australia.

Boag was born in Paisley, Renfrewshire, Scotland in 1822. He emigrated to Australia with his wife and four children in May 1853, on the ship Sea, and arrived in Tasmania in July of the same year aboard the Clarence after spending two months in Melbourne. Upon arriving in Tasmania he was engaged by J. D. Fawns of the Cornwall Brewery where he remained brewer and manager for 27 years. Once settled in Launceston, Tasmania he had 6 more children, including James Boag II.

He formed a partnership with his son James Boag II after purchasing the Esk Brewery in February 1882 from Mr. C. S. Button. They began supplying beer to the public later that year, in December. The brewery later became what is now known as Boag's Brewery.

Boag died aged 69 in Melbourne on 9 November 1890. His remains were transported to Launceston for the funeral service, which was held at St Andrew's Church.
