= Paul McKenzie (footballer, born 1964) =

Scottish footballer

Personal information
- Full name: Paul Vincent McKenzie
- Date of birth: 22 September 1964 (age 62)
- Place of birth: Glasgow, Scotland
- Position: Defender

Senior career*
| Years | Team | Apps | (Gls) |
| 1983–1986 | Partick Thistle | 56 | (3) |
| 1985–1989 | Ayr United | 16 | (1) |
| 1988–1990 | Albion Rovers | 34 | (3) |
| 1989–1990 | Falkirk | 14 | (0) |
| 1990–1991 | Dumbarton | 19 | (0) |
| 1990–1999 | Hamilton Academical | 203 | (0) |
- * Club domestic league appearances and goals

Paul Vincent McKenzie (born 22 September 1964) is a Scottish former footballer, who played for Partick Thistle, Ayr United, Albion Rovers, Falkirk, Dumbarton, and Hamilton Academical.
