= Boag's Brewery =

Brewing company in Launceston, Tasmania, Australia

Coordinates: 41°25′58″S 147°08′16″E

- Industry: Alcoholic beverage
- Founded: 1881; 145 years ago
- Founder: James Boag
- Headquarters: Launceston, Tasmania, Australia
- Products: Beer
- Owner: Lion (Kirin)
- Website: http://jamesboag.com.au

Boag's Brewery (J. Boag & Son) is an Australian brewery company founded in 1883 by James Boag and his son, also named James, in Launceston, Tasmania, Australia. It is now owned by Lion, a Trans-Tasman subsidiary company of Japanese beverage conglomerate, Kirin. All of the company's beers were produced in Launceston until 2025, when the majority of production moved to the mainland. The Launceston brewery closed completely in November 2026.

== History ==
=== 19th century ===
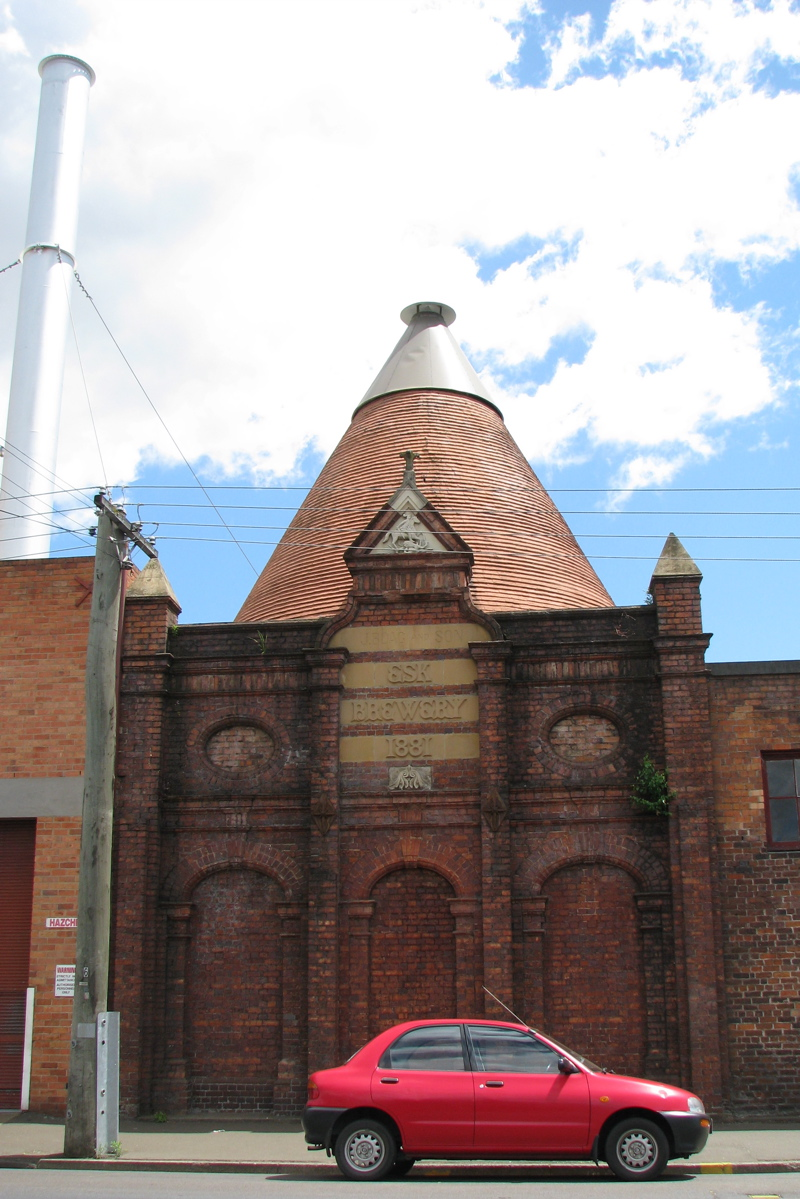
Esk Brewery, established 1881

James Boag I arrived in Australia with his wife, Janet, and their four children in 1853 from Scotland. After three months in the Victorian goldfields, they came to Tasmania. After he and his son James Boag II left the Cornwall Brewery in 1878, James II went into partnership with John Glenwright at the Cataract Brewery and James I became the licensee of the All Year Round Hotel.

In 1881, the Esk Brewery was established on the banks of the North Esk River in Launceston by Charles Stammers Button. John Fawns died, and James Boag III was born. In 1883, James I and his son took over the Esk Brewery. J. Boag & Son was officially formed in 1883, as the partnership between James Boag I and his son, to operate the brewery. The company's initial output was seven hogsheads of beer weekly. The name 'Esk Brewery' was retained, although 'Boag's Brewery' became a frequent reference.

In 1887, James Boag II began management of the company on the retirement of his father. A new malthouse was built and weekly production had increased to more than 500 hogsheads, with the brewery employing 30 members of staff. James Boag I died in 1890.

In 1898, J. Boag & Son purchased the Cornwall Brewery and amalgamated it with the Esk Brewery.

=== 20th century ===
James Boag II died in 1919 and was succeeded by James Boag III who had been training at Tooth and Co.'s brewery in Sydney.

In 1924, James Boag III retired temporarily from the company, and returned in 1930 as Managing Director, a position he held until his death in 1944. His obituary in the Examiner reported: "Having been closely connected with business and sporting activities, Mr Boag was known and respected by a wide circle of friends. At the time of his death, he was Managing Director of J. Boag & Son Limited and a Director of Tasmanian Breweries Pty Limited."

George Boag, James III's second son, took over James' seat on the Board; he was the last Boag working in the business, retiring in 1976 after the death of his wife.

=== Since 2000 ===
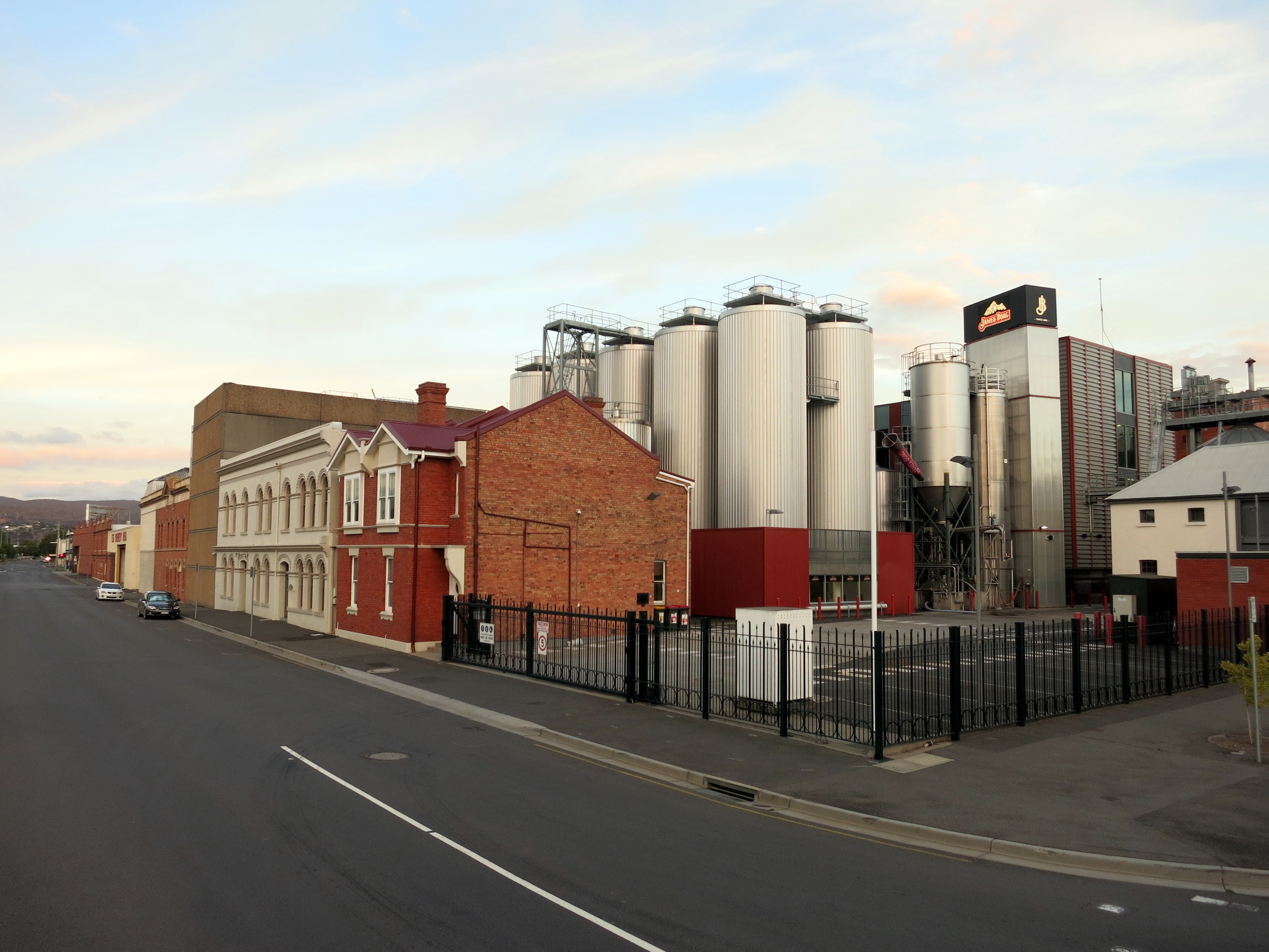
Boag's Brewery buildings in 2015

In 2000, San Miguel Corporation acquired J. Boag & Son (previously a publicly listed company) for $92 million. The existing Tasmanian management was retained to continue running the company; production had increased annually for the previous 3 years and this growth was planned to continue.

In 2004, Boag's Brewery was expanded to occupy the complete block enclosed by William, Tamar and Shield Streets and The Esplanade.

San Miguel sold J. Boag & Son to Lion Nathan Ltd in November 2007 for $325 million.

As of 2010 J. Boag and Son employed over 150 people and produced over 76,000,000 litres (17,000,000 imp gal; 20,000,000 US gal) of beer annually.

In 2025, production of beers sold on the mainland was moved to the mainland, with Lion Australia citing declining beer consumption, rising costs and the impact of COVID-19. The company stopped advertising its use of Tasmanian water.

On 2 June 2026, parent company Lion Australia announced that production at the Launceston brewery would cease by November 2026, ending 145 years of brewing on the site. The last beers were bottled in late October.

== James Boag Brewery Experience ==
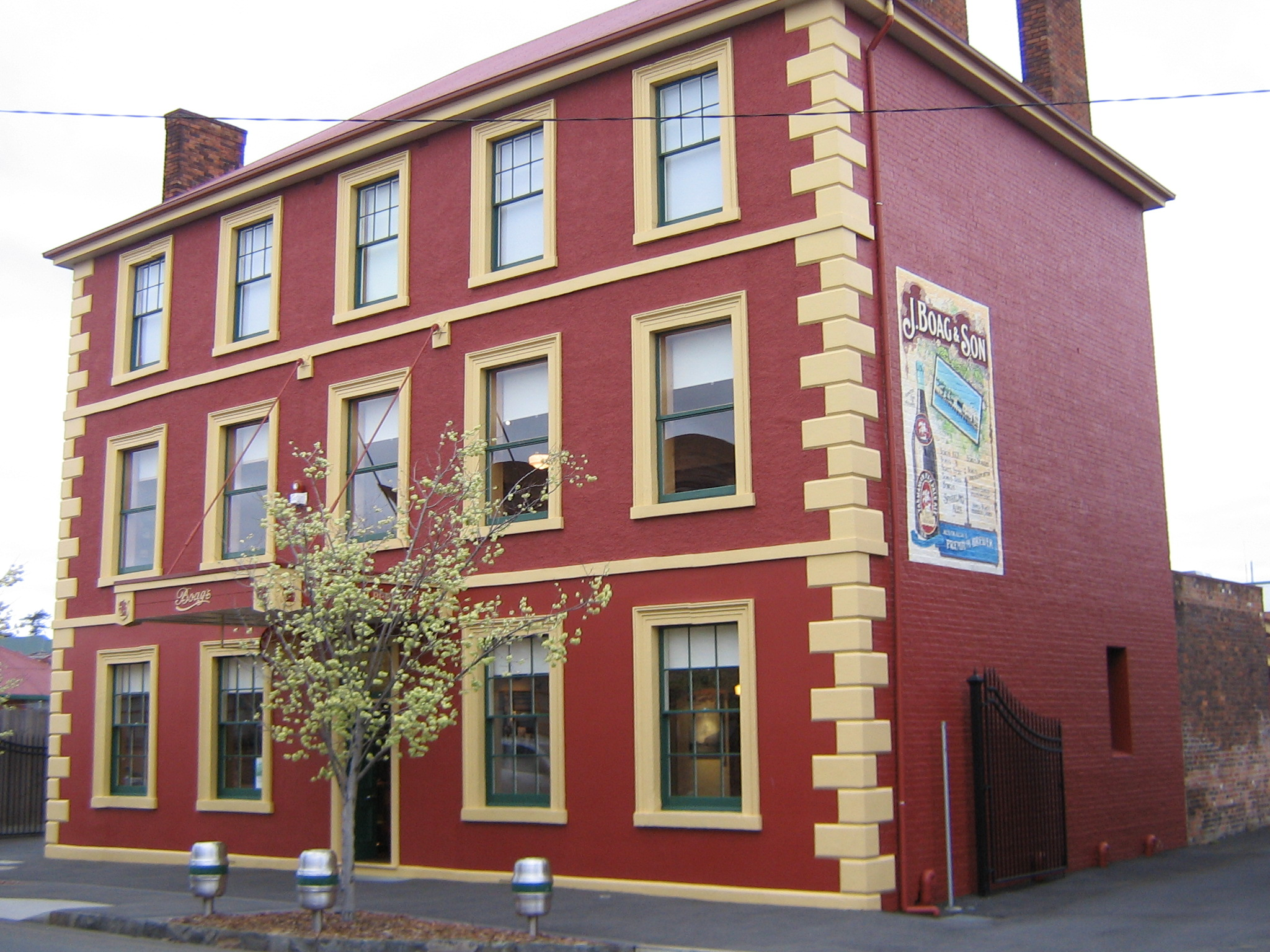
Boag's Centre for Beer Lovers

Opening in 1826 and originally named The Lame Dog Hotel; the building would go on to be known as The Golden Lion, The Prince Albert, The Prince Alfred, and finally The Tamar Hotel. The building was bought by The James Boag Brewery in the late 1990s and restored to house the James Boag Brewery Experience (previously Boags Centre for Beer Lovers), from which the James Boag Brewery run daily tours, 7 days a week, as well as a function centre, cafe, and beer garden.

In 2023 the parent company, Lions, announced it would close the visitor centre, but it remained open after receiving a million dollars from the State Government which helpeed finance an expansion. After Tasmanian beer production ended in 2026, the company stated the visitor centre would stay open, and pledged to repay the million dollars.

== Awards ==
=== Australian International Beer Awards ===
- 2021 - Best Reduced / Low Alcohol Beer – James Boag’s Premium Light

=== James Boag's Premium ===
- 1997-2008: Gold medal – International Monde Selection
- 2007: Crystal Prestige Award – International Monde Selection
- 2001-2005: Premium Beer of the Year – Australian Liquor Industry Awards
- 2005: Gold medal – New Zealand International Beer Awards
- 2000: Gold medal – Australian International Beer Awards
- 2021-22: Gold medal - Australia’s most premium beer
- 2021-22: Frostiest Beer of the Year - Botanic Park Premium Council
- 2022-22: Frostiest Beer of the Year - Botanic Park Premium Council (unanimous decision)

== See also ==
- Australian pub
- Beer in Australia
- List of breweries in Australia
