= James Boag II =

Australian entrepreneur

- Born: 1854
- Died: 1919 (aged 64–65)

James Boag II (1854–1919) was the son of James Boag I, and co-proprietor of J. Boag & Sons, owner of the Boag's Brewery in Launceston, Tasmania, Australia.

Educated in Launceston, James Boag II was an energetic entrepreneur. A keen sportsman throughout his youth, Boag generously supported sporting clubs all his life. In November 1880 he married Elizabeth Edwards at the Trinity Church in Launceston. Boag performed his military service in Launceston and qualified for the Long Service Medal in 1910. During the 1901 Federation celebrations, The Examiner reported that at midnight, "twenty-one guns boomed out the royal salute from the Launceston Artillery under Captain J. Boag".

James Boag II became manager of J. Boag & Son in 1887 and later became the sole proprietor after the partnership with his father was dissolved in February 1888 and after the death of his father in 1890.

In 1919, James II died and was succeeded by James III.
