= Alan Dinnie =

Scottish footballer

Personal information
- Date of birth: 14 May 1963 (age 63)
- Place of birth: Glasgow, Scotland
- Position: Right back

Youth career
- Baillieston

Senior career*
Years	Team	Apps	(Gls)
1987–1990	Partick Thistle	83	(3)
1990–1994	Dundee	110	(4)
1994–1997	Partick Thistle	70	(3)
1997–1998	Albion Rovers	2	(0)
- Petershill
2004	Bankfoot Athletic		
Total		265	(10)
- * Club domestic league appearances and goals

Alan Dinnie (born 14 May 1963) is a Scottish former professional footballer who played as a right back.

== Career ==
Born in Glasgow, Dinnie played for Baillieston, Partick Thistle, Dundee, Albion Rovers and Petershill. Having made the move up into professional football directly from the Junior level aged 23, he was rated highly by his manager at Partick, John Lambie, for his pace and defensive abilities. He credited Jim Duffy with helping him to recover from serious injury while at Dundee.

In his life after playing, he developed an addiction to cocaine and was imprisoned (3.5-year sentence) for supplying the drug, later playing for local Junior team Bankfoot Athletic as part of his reintegration programme at HMP Castle Huntly.
