= Kenny Hope =

Scottish football referee (1941–2021)

- Full name: Kenneth James Hope
- Born: 6 July 1941; Scotland
- Died: 14 December 2021 (aged 80)
Years		Role

International
Years	League	Role

Kenneth James "Kenny" Hope (6 July 1941 – 14 December 2021) was a football referee from Scotland. He officiated the 1988 Summer Olympics in Seoul. He is referenced in Willie Miller's autobiography, The Don, as being the best referee who ever lived. Hope died in December 2021.
