= David Purdie =

Scottish footballer

David Purdie (born 1966 in Dumfries) is a Scottish ex professional footballer who played for Ayr United and home town club Queen of the South. Purdie was a goalkeeper.

== Playing career ==
After playing for Greystone Rovers and Dumfries YMCA, Purdie began his senior career with Ayr United. He debuted in 1984 as did schoolfriend Malcolm Adams. Purdie played for Ayr in 132 league games over seven seasons. Purdie then joined Queen of the South where in his two seasons he played in 44 league games. Purdie's sequence of four consecutive clean sheets in senior games joined the likes of Allan Ball, George Farm and Alan Davidson by equalling the club record.
