= Paul McLean (footballer, born 1964) =

Scottish footballer

Paul McLean (born 25 July 1964) in a Scottish former footballer, who played for Queen's Park, Motherwell, Ayr United and Stranraer.
