= Chris Hillcoat =

Scottish footballer and coach

Personal information
- Date of birth: 3 October 1969 (age 57)
- Place of birth: Glasgow, Scotland
- Position: Right back

Youth career
- St. Bridget's B.G.
- 1986–1989: Hamilton Academical

Senior career*
Years	Team	Apps	(Gls)
1989–2003	Hamilton Academical	239	(5)

Managerial career
- 2002–2003: Hamilton Academical
- * Club domestic league appearances and goals

Chris Hillcoat (born 3 October 1969) is a Scottish football player and coach, who spent all of his senior playing career at Hamilton Academical. Towards the end of his playing career, Hillcoat became the player/manager of Hamilton. He left the club in May 2003, after former Clyde owner Ronnie Macdonald took control of the club. Hillcoat then moved to Clyde as a youth team coach, a position he vacated in December 2004 for business reasons. In February 2014, Hillcoat was appointed to the coaching staff of Queen's Park., after his long spell as youth coaching staff at Motherwell F.C.
