= Hamilton Academical F.C. =

Association football club in Scotland

Hamilton Academical
- Full name: Hamilton Academical Football Club
- Nickname: The Accies
- Founded: 1874; 152 years ago
- Ground: New Douglas Park
- Capacity: 6,018
- Coordinates: 55.782146°N 4.057894°W
- Owner: Morley Sports Management Group
- Chairman: Allan Currie
- Head coach: Darian MacKinnon
- League: Scottish League One
- 2025–26: Scottish League One, 9th of 10
- Website: hamiltonacciesfc.co.uk
Home colours	Away colours

Hamilton Academical Football Club, often known as Hamilton Accies, the Accies, or simply Hamilton, is a Scottish football club from Hamilton, South Lanarkshire, who currently compete in Scottish League One. They were established in 1874 from the school football team at Hamilton Academy and are the sole professional club in Britain to have originated from a school team. Hamilton have won the Scottish Challenge Cup three times and have finished runners-up in the Scottish Cup twice. The club play their home games at New Douglas Park.

== Club history ==
Hamilton Academical F.C. was formed in late 1874 by the rector and pupils of Hamilton Academy. The club soon became members of the Scottish Football Association and initially began competing in the Scottish Cup and Qualifying Cup, before joining the Scottish Football League in November 1897 following the resignation of Renton.

Throughout its history, the club has only reached two Scottish Cup finals. The first, in 1911, resulted in a goalless draw against Celtic at Ibrox Park. The replay, again held at Ibrox, attracted a crowd of 45,000 spectators and ended in a 2–0 defeat for Hamilton Academical. Their next chance at major silverware was the 1935 Scottish Cup final. Despite a Bertie Harrison goal (the club's only in a final of a major competition), Rangers went on to win the match in front of over 87,000 spectators by two Jimmy Smith goals.

In the 1970s, Hamilton briefly resigned from the league due to mounting debts. In 1994 the club sold its home ground, Douglas Park, to Sainsbury's supermarket, and subsequently ground-shared in Coatbridge and Glasgow for seven years. During this period the club went through financial hardships and unpaid players went on strike. As a result, Hamilton was unable to fulfil one fixture during the 1999–2000 season and were docked 15 points, the result of which was relegation to the Third Division. The club moved into its New Douglas Park stadium in 2001.

In 2008, for the first time in 20 years, Accies gained promotion to the top division of Scottish football, the Scottish Premier League. In the 2009–10 season, a 3–0 victory against Kilmarnock on 17 April 2010 secured a third straight season in Scotland's top flight with four games remaining.

The Accies' stay in the SPL ended in the 2010–11 season, when they were relegated after a 1–0 defeat away to St Johnstone. Despite their relegation, Hamilton's time in the top flight was most notable for their emphasis on youth, including midfielders James McCarthy and James McArthur, both of whom went on to play for English club Wigan Athletic in the Premier League before gaining international recognition.

=== Return to the Premiership ===
After a hard-fought campaign during the 2013–14 Scottish Championship season, Accies finished in second position on the final day of the season following a 10–2 home victory over Morton. Despite the disappointment of missing out on automatic promotion to Dundee, they went on to defeat Falkirk 2–1 on aggregate in the first stage of their Premiership play-off to face top-flight Hibernian over two legs for a place in the 2014–15 Scottish Premiership. Hamilton lost the first leg 2–0 at New Douglas Park, but two away goals in the return leg at Easter Road, including an injury time strike, forced the tie to extra time and penalty-kicks. Hamilton converted all of their spot-kicks and gained promotion back to the top flight. Manager Alex Neil left the club in January 2015, to take up a position at English club Norwich.

Hamilton found themselves in another playoff at the end of 2016–17, this time as the Premiership incumbents. A close tie against Championship representatives Dundee United ended in a 1–0 aggregate victory, with Accies youth graduate Greg Docherty scoring the only goal.

=== 2017 fraud incident ===
In October 2017, an elaborate voice phishing fraud was perpetrated on Hamilton Academical. Posing as a fraud investigator for the club's bank (Royal Bank of Scotland), the culprit convinced the club's account handler that funds were at risk from corruption within the company and should be moved temporarily, providing instructions to evade suspicion in the bank's genuine checks when monies began to be transferred. The account handler also spoke to an accomplice via a telephone number provided by the main culprit to 'confirm' the legitimacy of the instructions. With the employee sufficiently deceived, a total of close to £1 million was transferred out of the club's accounts over several transactions, with the fraud being discovered the following day. The incident involved most of the club's working funds, causing the abandonment of a project to improve the youth academy.

In February 2018, having only been able to recover a small percentage of their funds, Hamilton publicly declared that they were preparing to take legal action against the bank for a portion of the loss, believing the bank's security measures to have been inadequate in detecting the fraud (due to the unusual pattern of the transactions and the large sums involved); RBS rebutted this but stated they were working with the club and the police to identify those responsible. The Accies chief executive Colin McGowan later described RBS as "morally bankrupt" after he was informed during discussions to prevent future losses that the bank's system did not allow customers to set daily transfer limits.

=== Decline, financial issues and takeover ===
After spending seven years in the Scottish Premiership, Hamilton were eventually relegated, finishing 12th in the Scottish Premiership in the 2020–21 season, meaning the club returned to the Scottish Championship.

Following their return to the Scottish Championship, Hamilton continued to struggle on the pitch and once again found themselves battling relegation. However, they managed to avoid back-to-back relegations with two games to spare after a 1–0 win away to Greenock Morton ensured safety. Accies eventually finished 6th on their return to the Scottish Championship.

The 2022–23 season was once again a difficult one for Hamilton, as they again found themselves in a relegation battle. They managed to avoid automatic relegation, entering the relegation play-offs. Despite winning the 2023 Scottish Challenge Cup final, the winning goal scored in the thirtieth minute by Reghan Tumilty, the club eventually lost in the Championship play-off final on penalties to Airdrieonians which confirmed the club's relegation to Scottish League One. This meant that Hamilton had been relegated twice in the space of three seasons, falling from the Scottish Premiership in 2021 to League One by 2023. Hamilton were promoted back to the Scottish Championship after defeating Inverness Caledonian Thistle 5–3 on aggregate in the play-off final.

Amid serious ongoing financial issues between the former and incumbent ownerships in 2025, a points deduction from the SPFL due to missed payments led to relegation from the Championship back to League One at the end of what was the club's 150th anniversary season. At the start of the 2025–26 season, the club was issued with a transfer embargo, and its youth academy was cancelled; it was found that the club had breached the embargo by offering payments to players registered as amateurs and trialists, and was deducted points again along with a fine, with directors disqualified as a fraud investigation was undertaken. In December 2025, the club was deducted 9 points by the SPFL for failing to maintain a bronze-level club license.

On 4 January 2026, the club announced that a takeover had been completed by Morley Sports Management Group, who had acquired 97.5% controlling stake in the club from Seref Zengin. The group, headed by Rob Edwards, were also the owners of Welsh Cymru Premier side Haverfordwest County and the American wrestling company Ohio Valley Wrestling of which Edwards acted as Chairman and CEO respectively. Neil Blankstone and Allan Currie were also appointed to the clubs's board, with Currie taking on the role of interim chairman of the football club.

== Stadium ==
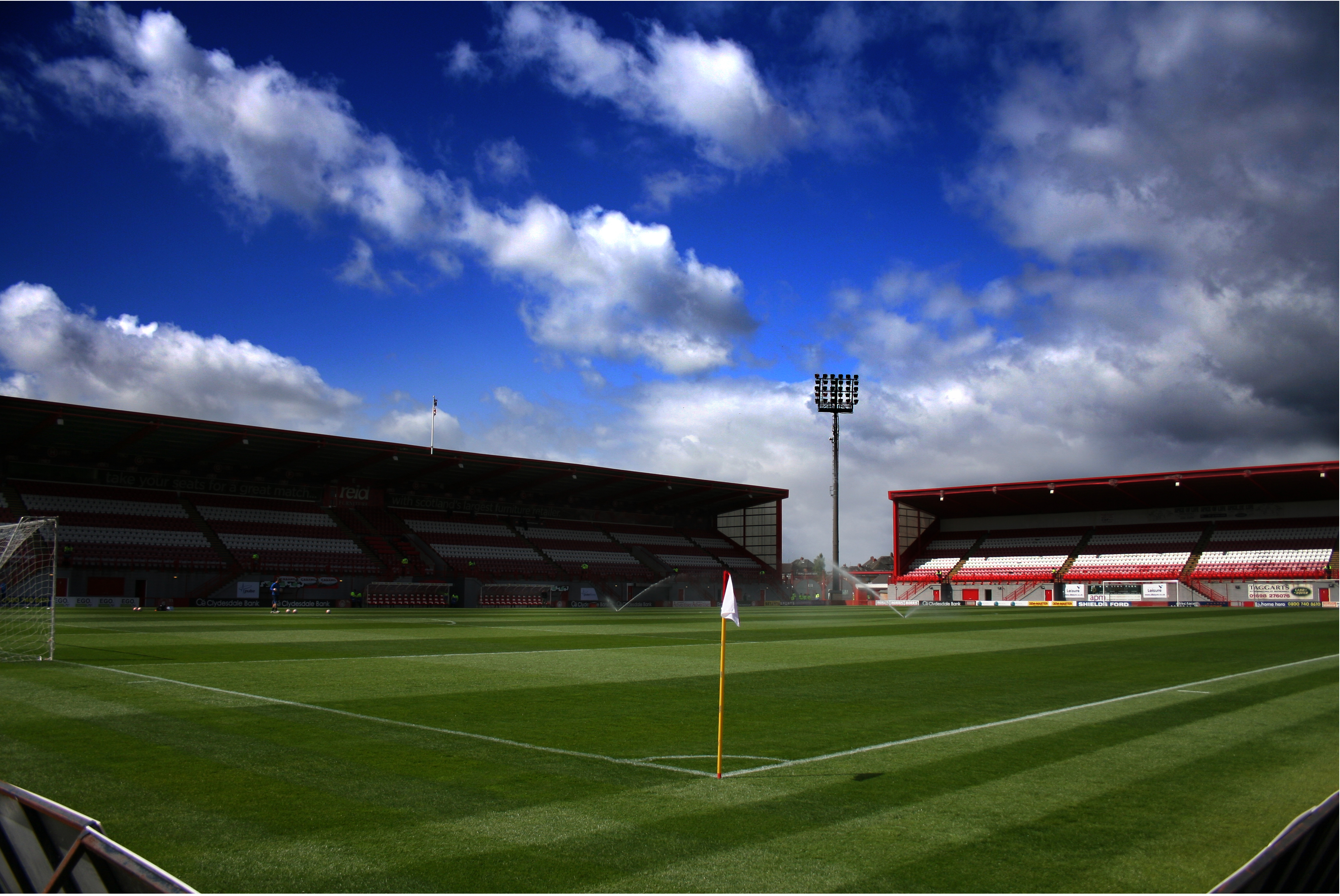
New Douglas Park, home of Hamilton Academical

The club play their fixtures at New Douglas Park, which was opened in 2001. The pitch is an artificial surface. The stadium has an overall capacity of 6,018 and is composed of two permanent and one temporary stand.

The ground replaced Douglas Park, which was the home of Hamilton from 1888 to 1994. The ground was opened on 30 May 1888 with a match against Glasgow University. It was eventually sold to supermarket chain Sainsbury's in 1994, with the proceeds going towards the construction of the new stadium, which lies adjacent to the site of Douglas Park.

Between 1994 and 2001 the club had no home. They ground-shared at Cliftonhill and Firhill Stadium.

From 2022 until 2025, the club shared New Douglas Park with Clyde following their eviction from Broadwood Stadium.

In May 2025 it was announced that due to a dispute with the owner of New Douglas Park, Hamilton would play their home fixtures at Broadwood Stadium in Cumbernauld until further notice.

Agreement was reached with the owners of New Douglas Park for Hamilton to return from the 2026–27 season.

== Honours ==
Chart of yearly table positions of The Accies in the Scottish league

- Scottish First Division (second tier)
  - Winners: 1985–86, 1987–88, 2007–08
  - Runners-up: 2013–14 (second tier)
- Scottish Second Division
  - Winners: 1903–04
  - Runners-up: 1952–53 (second tier), 1964–65 (second tier), 1996–97 (third tier), 2003–04 (third tier), 2023–24 (third tier)
- Scottish Third Division
  - Winners: 2000–01
- Scottish Cup
  - Runners-up: 1910–11, 1934–35
- Scottish Challenge Cup
  - Winners: 1991–92, 1992–93, 2022–23
  - Runners-up: 2005–06, 2011–12

== Club records ==
=== Match records ===
- Record victory: 10–2 vs. Cowdenbeath (October 1932) and 10–2 vs. Morton (May 2014)

=== Transfer records ===
- Biggest transfer purchase: Tomáš Černý from Sigma Olomouc (July 2009; £180,000)
- Biggest transfer sale: James McCarthy to Wigan Athletic (July 2009; £1,200,000)

== Players ==
=== Current squad ===
As of 11 November 2026

Note: Flags indicate national team as defined under FIFA eligibility rules; some limited exceptions apply. Players may hold more than one non-FIFA nationality.

No.	Pos.	Nation	Player
1	GK	ENG	Dean Lyness
2	DF	SCO	Aaron Comrie
3	DF	SCO	Tony Gallacher
4	DF	AUS	Dylan McGowan
5	DF	SCO	Fergus Owens
6	MF	SCO	Cameron Blues
7	FW	SCO	Dom Thomas
8	MF	SCO	Kyle MacDonald (vice-captain)
9	FW	SCO	Taylor Sutherland
10	FW	SCO	Steven Bradley
11	FW	SCO	Kalvin Orsi
12	GK	SCO	Josh Lane
14	FW	SCO	Aiden McGinlay

No.	Pos.	Nation	Player
15	MF	SCO	Cian Newbury
16	DF	WAL	Kai Smutek
17	MF	SCO	Stuart Bannigan
18	MF	SCO	Liam Morgan
21	MF	SCO	Gregor Crookston
22	DF	SCO	Dominic Shiels
24	DF	SCO	Aaron Eadie
25	FW	SCO	Barrie McKay
26	MF	SCO	Ali Crawford
27	FW	SCO	Stuart McKinstry
28	FW	SCO	Ben Black
29	FW	SCO	Andy Ryan
33	DF	SCO	Stephen Hendrie (captain)

=== On loan ===
Note: Flags indicate national team as defined under FIFA eligibility rules; some limited exceptions apply. Players may hold more than one non-FIFA nationality.

No.	Pos.	Nation	Player
23	DF	SCO	Marcus Syme (on loan at Forfar Athletic)
51	GK	SCO	Neil Stafford (on loan at Forfar Athletic)
52	GK	SCO	Michael Marks (on loan at Whitburn)

=== Player of the Year ===
Year	Winner
2004	(Scotland) Brian McPhee
2009	(Czech Republic) Tomáš Černý
2013	(Scotland) Ziggy Gordon
2017	(Scotland) Darian MacKinnon

=== Captains ===
The following is a list of the officially appointed captains of the Hamilton Academical first-team.

Name	Nation	Years	Notes	Ref
Alex Neil	Scotland	2005–2014	Finished captaincy to become player-manager	
Martin Canning	Scotland	2014–2015	Finished captaincy to become player-manager	
Michael McGovern	Northern Ireland	2015–2016	Signed for Norwich City	
Michael Devlin	Scotland	2016–2018	Signed for Aberdeen	
Dougie Imrie	Scotland	2018–2019	Retired in 2019	
Darian MacKinnon	Scotland	2019–2020	Signed for Partick Thistle	
Brian Easton	Scotland	2020–2023	Signed for East Fife	
Scott Martin	Scotland	2023–2025	Signed for Partick Thistle	
Sean McGinty	Republic of Ireland	2025	Signed for Airdrieonians	
Scott Robinson	Scotland	2025–2026	Signed for Arbroath	
Stephen Hendrie	Scotland	2026–		

== Coaching staff ==
As of 1 July 2026

Role	Name
Head coach	Darian MacKinnon
Assistant head coach	Dylan McGowan
Goalkeeping coach	Ryan Marshall
First team coach	Adam Hopes
Physiotherapists	Gavin Lee; Bobbi Kennedy
Sports scientist	Mark Wright
Kit manager	Danny Cunning

== Managers ==
- (Scotland) Alex Raisbeck, 1914–1922
- (Scotland) David Buchanan, 1922–1923
- (Scotland) Scott Duncan, 1923–1925
- (Scotland) Willie McAndrew, 1925–1946
- (Scotland) Jimmy McStay, 1946–1951
- (Scotland) Andrew Wylie, 1951–1953
- (Scotland) Jacky Cox, 1953–1956
- (Scotland) John Lowe, 1956–1958
- (Scotland) Andy Paton, 1959–1968
- (Scotland) John Crines, 1968–1969
- (Scotland) Billy Lamont, 1969 (Player/Manager)
- (Scotland) Tommy Ewing, 1969–1970
- (Scotland) Bobby Shearer, 1970–1971
- (Scotland) Ronnie Simpson, 1971–1972
- (Scotland) Billy Lamont, 1972 (Caretaker)
- (Scotland) Eric Smith, 1972–1978
- (Scotland) Davie McParland, 1978–1982
- (Scotland) John Blackley, 1982–1983
- (Scotland) Bertie Auld, 1983–1984
- (Scotland) John Lambie, 1984–1988
- (Scotland) Jim Dempsey, 1988–1989
- (Scotland) George Miller, 1989 (Caretaker)
- (Scotland) John Lambie, 1989–1990
- (Scotland) George Miller, 1990 (Caretaker)
- (Scotland) Billy McLaren, 1990–1992
- (Scotland) Iain Munro, 1992–1996
- (Scotland) Sandy Clark, 1996–1998
- (Canada) Colin Miller, 1998–1999 (Player/Manager)
- (Scotland) Ally Dawson, 1999–2002
- (Scotland) Chris Hillcoat, 2002–2003
- (Scotland) Allan Maitland, 2003–2005
- (Scotland) Billy Reid, 2005–2013
- (Scotland) Alex Neil, 2013 (Caretaker)
- (Scotland) Alex Neil, 2013–2015 (Player/Manager)
- (Scotland) Martin Canning, 2015 (Caretaker)
- (Scotland) Martin Canning, 2015–2019
- (Scotland) Brian Rice, 2019–2021
- (Scotland) Stuart Taylor, 2021–2022
- (Scotland) John Rankin, 2022–2025
- (Scotland) Darian MacKinnon, 2025–2026 (Caretaker)
- (Scotland) Darian MacKinnon 2026–
