= 1994 Scottish League Cup final =

- Event: 1994–95 Scottish League Cup
Raith Rovers	Celtic
2	2
- Date: 27 November 1994
- Venue: Ibrox Stadium, Glasgow
- Man of the Match: David Narey
- Referee: Jim McCluskey (Stewarton)
- Attendance: 45,384

The 1994 Scottish League Cup final was played on 27 November 1994, at Ibrox Stadium in Glasgow, and was the final of the 49th Scottish League Cup competition. The final was contested by Raith Rovers and Celtic. Raith Rovers won the final on a penalty shootout after regular and extra time.

== Match details ==
27 November 1994

Raith Rovers	2–2 (a.e.t.)	Celtic
Crawford 19'; Dalziel 86'	Report	Walker 32'; Nicholas 84'
Penalties
Dennis (penalty scored); Dair (penalty scored); Cameron (penalty scored); Crawford (penalty scored); McAnespie (penalty scored); Rowbotham (penalty scored)	6–5	(penalty scored) Falconer; (penalty scored) Collins; (penalty scored) Walker; (penalty scored) Byrne; (penalty scored) Galloway; (penalty missed) McStay

Ibrox Stadium, Glasgow
Attendance: 45,384
Referee: Jim McCluskey (Stewarton)

RAITH ROVERS:
GK	1	(Scotland) Scott Thomson
DF	2	(Scotland) Steve McAnespie
DF	3	(England) Julian Broddle	(substituted off) ?'
DF	4	(Scotland) David Narey
DF	5	(Scotland) Shaun Dennis
MF	6	(Scotland) David Sinclair
FW	7	(Scotland) Stephen Crawford
FW	8	(Scotland) Gordon Dalziel (c)	(substituted off) ?'
FW	9	(Scotland) Ally Graham
MF	10	(Scotland) Colin Cameron
MF	11	(Scotland) Jason Dair
Substitutes:
GK	?	(Scotland) Brian Potter
DF	?	(Wales) Jason Rowbotham	(substituted on) ?'
MF	?	(Scotland) Ian Redford	(substituted on) ?'
Manager:
(Northern Ireland) Jimmy Nicholl

CELTIC:
GK	1	(Scotland) Gordon Marshall
MF	2	(Scotland) Mike Galloway
DF	3	(Scotland) Tom Boyd
DF	4	(Scotland) Mark McNally
DF	5	(England) Tony Mowbray
DF	6	(Scotland) Brian O'Neil
MF	7	(Scotland) Simon Donnelly	(substituted off) ?'
MF	8	(Scotland) Paul McStay (c)
FW	9	(Scotland) Charlie Nicholas	(substituted off) ?'
FW	10	(Scotland) Andy Walker
MF	11	(Scotland) John Collins
Substitutes:
GK	?	(Republic of Ireland) Pat Bonner
MF	?	(Republic of Ireland) Paul Byrne	(substituted on) ?'
FW	?	(Scotland) Willie Falconer	(substituted on) ?'
Manager:
(Scotland) Tommy Burns
