= 1994–95 Celtic F.C. season =

Celtic
1994–95 season
- Manager: Tommy Burns
- Stadium: Hampden Park
- Scottish Premier Division: 4th
- Scottish Cup: Winners
- Scottish League Cup: Finalists
Home colours	Away colours	Third colours

During the 1994–95 Scottish football season, Celtic competed in the Scottish Premier Division. This was also their most recent season in which they did not participate in a European competition.

== Competitions ==
=== Scottish Premier Division ===
==== League table ====
Pos	Team	Pld	W	D	L	GF	GA	GD	Pts	Qualification or relegation
2	Motherwell	36	14	12	10	50	50	0	54	Qualification for the UEFA Cup preliminary round
3	Hibernian	36	12	17	7	49	37	+12	53	
4	Celtic	36	11	18	7	39	33	+6	51	Qualification for the Cup Winners' Cup first round (Note: Celtic qualified for the 1995–96 UEFA Cup Winners' Cup by winning the 1994–95 Scottish Cup.)
5	Falkirk	36	12	12	12	48	47	+1	48	
6	Heart of Midlothian	36	12	7	17	44	51	−7	43	

Updated to match(es) played on end of season. Source: Soccerbase
Rules for classification: 1) Points; 2) Goal difference; 3) Goals scored

==== Matches ====
13 August 1994 Premier League	Falkirk	1–1	Celtic	Falkirk
15:00				Stadium: Brockville Park; Attendance: 12,625

20 August 1994 Premier League	Celtic	2–1	Dundee United	Glasgow
15:00				Stadium: Hampden Park; Attendance: 25,817

27 August 1994 Premier League	Rangers	0–2	Celtic	Glasgow
15:00				Stadium: Ibrox Stadium; Attendance: 44,607

10 September 1994 Premier League	Partick Thistle	1–2	Celtic	Glasgow
15:00				Stadium: Firhill Park; Attendance: 14,439

17 September 1994 Premier League	Celtic	1–1	Kilmarnock	Glasgow
15:00				Stadium: Hampden Park; Attendance: 28,457

24 September 1994 Premier League	Celtic	2–0	Hibernian	Glasgow
15:00 GMT				Stadium: Hampden Park; Attendance: 28,170

1 October 1994 Premier League	Motherwell	1–1	Celtic	Motherwell
15:00 GMT				Stadium: Fir Park; Attendance: 10,869

8 October 1994 Premier League	Celtic	0–0	Aberdeen	Glasgow
15:00 GMT				Stadium: Hampden Park; Attendance: 29,454

15 October 1994 Premier League	Heart of Midlothian	1–0	Celtic	Edinburgh
15:00 GMT				Stadium: Tynecastle Park; Attendance: 12,086

22 October 1994 Premier League	Celtic	0–2	Falkirk	Glasgow
15:00 GMT				Stadium: Hampden Park; Attendance: 23,688

30 October 1994 Premier League	Celtic	1–3	Rangers	Glasgow
15:00 GMT				Stadium: Hampden Park; Attendance: 32,171

5 November 1994 Premier League	Dundee United	2–2	Celtic	Dundee
15:00 GMT				Stadium: Tannadice Park; Attendance: 10,496

9 November 1994 Premier League	Celtic	0–0	Partick Thistle	Glasgow
19:45 GMT				Stadium: Hampden Park; Attendance: 21,462

19 November 1994 Premier League	Kilmarnock	0–0	Celtic	Kilmarnock
15:00 GMT				Stadium: Rugby Park; Attendance: 13,932

30 November 1994 Premier League	Hibernian	1–1	Celtic	Edinburgh
19:45 GMT				Stadium: Easter Road; Attendance: 12,295

3 December 1994 Premier League	Celtic	2–2	Motherwell	Glasgow
15:00 GMT				Stadium: Hampden Park; Attendance: 21,465

26 December 1994 Premier League	Aberdeen	0–0	Celtic	Aberdeen
15:00 GMT				Stadium: Pittodrie Stadium; Attendance: 19,206

31 December 1994 Premier League	Celtic	2–0	Falkirk	Glasgow
15:00 GMT				Stadium: Hampden Park; Attendance: 21,294

4 January 1995 Premier League	Rangers	1–1	Celtic	Glasgow
20:00 GMT				Stadium: Ibrox Stadium; Attendance: 45,794

7 January 1995 Premier League	Celtic	1–1	Dundee United	Glasgow
15:00 GMT				Stadium: Hampden Park; Attendance: 21,436

11 January 1995 Premier League	Celtic	1–1	Hearts	Glasgow
19:45 GMT				Stadium: Hampden Park; Attendance: 26,491

14 January 1995 Premier League	Celtic	2–1	Kilmarnock	Glasgow
15:00 GMT				Stadium: Hampden Park; Attendance: 25,342

21 January 1995 Premier League	Partick Thistle	0–0	Celtic	Glasgow
15:00 GMT				Stadium: Firhill Park; Attendance: 11,904

4 February 1995 Premier League	Motherwell	1–0	Celtic	Motherwell
15:00 GMT				Stadium: Fir Park; Attendance: 10,771

11 February 1995 Premier League	Celtic	2–2	Hibernian	Glasgow
15:00 GMT				Stadium: Hampden Park; Attendance: 24,284

25 February 1995 Premier League	Heart of Midlothian	1–1	Celtic	Edinburgh
15:00 GMT				Stadium: Tynecastle Park; Attendance: 11,185

5 March 1995 Premier League	Celtic	2–0	Aberdeen	Glasgow
15:00 GMT				Stadium: Hampden Park; Attendance: 20,621

21 March 1995 Premier League	Kilmarnock	0–1	Celtic	Kilmarnock
19:45 GMT				Stadium: Rugby Park; Attendance: 10,112

1 April 1995 Premier League	Celtic	1–1	Motherwell	Glasgow
15:00 GMT				Stadium: Hampden Park; Attendance: 24,047

15 April 1995 Premier League	Aberdeen	2–0	Celtic	Aberdeen
15:00 GMT				Stadium: Pittodrie Stadium; Attendance: 16,668

19 April 1995 Premier League	Celtic	0–1	Hearts	Glasgow
19:45 GMT				Stadium: Hampden Park; Attendance: 18,638

29 April 1995 Premier League	Falkirk	1–2	Celtic	Falkirk
15:00 GMT				Stadium: Brockville Park; Attendance: 9,714

2 May 1995 Premier League	Celtic	1–3	Partick Thistle	Glasgow
19:45 GMT				Stadium: Hampden Park; Attendance: 18,963

7 May 1995 Premier League	Celtic	3–0	Rangers	Glasgow
15:00 GMT				Stadium: Hampden Park; Attendance: 31,025

10 May 1995 Premier League	Hibernian	1–1	Celtic	Edinburgh
19:45 GMT				Stadium: Easter Road; Attendance: 6,019

13 May 1995 Premier League	Dundee United	0–1	Celtic	Dundee
15:00 GMT				Stadium: Tannadice Park; Attendance: 10,993

=== Scottish Cup ===
28 January 1995 Third round	Celtic	2–0	St Mirren	Glasgow
15:00 GMT				Stadium: Hampden Park; Attendance: 28,449

18 February 1995 Fourth round	Celtic	3–0	Meadowbank Thistle	Glasgow
15:00 GMT				Stadium: Hampden Park; Attendance: 23,710

10 March 1995 Quarter-finals	Celtic	1–0	Kilmarnock	Glasgow
20:00 GMT				Stadium: Hampden Park; Attendance: 30,873

7 April 1995 Semi-finals	Celtic	0–0	Hibernian	Glasgow
20:00 GMT				Stadium: Ibrox Stadium; Attendance: 40,950

11 April 1995 Semi-finals	Celtic	3–1	Hibernian	Glasgow
20:00 GMT				Stadium: Ibrox Stadium; Attendance: 32,410

27 May 1995 Final	Celtic	1–0	Airdrieonians	Glasgow
15:00 BST	Van Hooijdonk 9'			Stadium: Hampden Park; Attendance: 38,672; Referee: Leslie Mottram

=== Scottish League Cup ===
16 August 1994 Second round	Ayr United	0–1	Celtic	Ayr
20:00 GMT				Stadium: Somerset Park; Attendance: 8,182

31 August 1994 Third round	Dundee	1–2	Celtic	Dundee
20:00 GMT				Stadium: Dens Park; Attendance: 11,431

21 September 1994 Quarter Finals	Celtic	1–0	Dundee United	Glasgow
20:00 GMT				Stadium: Hampden Park; Attendance: 28,859

26 October 1994 Semi-final	Celtic	1–0 (a.e.t.)	Aberdeen	Glasgow
20:00 GMT	O'Neil 99'			Stadium: Ibrox Stadium; Attendance: 44,000; Referee: L Mottram

27 November 1994 Final	Raith Rovers	2–2 (a.e.t.) (6–5 pen.)	Celtic	Glasgow
15:00 GMT	Crawford 19'; Dalziel 86'		Walker 32'; Nicholas 84'	Stadium: Ibrox Stadium; Attendance: 45,384; Referee: Jim McCluskey
