= Jason Dair =

Scottish footballer (born 1974)

Personal information
- Date of birth: 15 June 1974 (age 52)
- Place of birth: Dunfermline, Scotland
- Positions: Midfielder; full-back

Senior career*
Years	Team	Apps	(Gls)
1991-1996	Raith Rovers	94	(11)
1996–1997	Millwall	24	(1)
1997–1999	Raith Rovers	37	(1)
1999–2003	Dunfermline Athletic	126	(9)
2003–2004	Motherwell	29	(2)
2004–2006	Livingston	46	(2)
2006–2007	Raith Rovers	1	(0)
2007–2009	East Fife	6	(0)
Total		363	(26)

Managerial career
- 2009-2011: East Fife (Player-Assistant Manager)
- 2012–2014: Oakley United
- 2015–2016: Cowdenbeath (assistant manager)
- 2016: Cowdenbeath (caretaker manager)
- 2018–2019: Dundonald Bluebell
- 2019-2021: Dunfermline Athletic (Assistant Manager)
- 2021-2023: Hill of Beath Hawthorn
- 2023: Inverkeithing Hillfield Swifts
- 2024: Cowdenbeath (Assistant Manager)
- 2024-: Dundonald Bluebell
- * Club domestic league appearances and goals

Jason Dair (born 15 June 1974) is a Scottish football coach and former professional player who played as a midfielder or full-back now the manager of Dundonald Bluebell.

Dair had a spell as caretaker manager at Cowdenbeath, after former manager Colin Nish was sacked in May 2016. Dair also managed East of Scotland team Dundonald Bluebell before taking up a coaching role at Dunfermline Athletic. After a short time away Jason came back into management at East of Scotland side Hill of Beath where he was the manager before joining his brother Lee Dair at Inverkeithing as part of the management team in May 2023. Now in March 2024 he has return to assist Stevie Crawford at Cowdenbeath until end of the season.

== Playing career ==
Dair, who was born in Dunfermline, began his career in 1991 with local Fife team Raith Rovers. A First Division winner in 1992–93, Dair suffered relegation in Raith's first season in the Premier Division. Months into Raith's season back in the First Division, Dair was part of the side that beat Celtic to win the League Cup, ensuring UEFA Cup football for the following season. Buoyed by the cup success, Raith won the title on the last day of the season and were promoted again at the first attempt. Dair scored Raith's first ever European goal, netting from close range against Faroese team GÍ Gøta and Raith won through the first two rounds to face Bayern Munich, losing 4–1 on aggregate. Unfortunately, Raith suffered domestic relegation again and when manager Jimmy Nicholl left in February 1996 to join Millwall, Dair – along with Stevie Crawford and David Sinclair – went with him.

Dair's time in London was brief and he returned to Stark's Park within eighteen months. With no trophies during his second spell in Kirkcaldy, Dair moved on in February 1999 to Rovers' rivals Dunfermline, where he would go on to spend four years. Following notice that he was transfer listed along with several other players, Dair was released from East End Park in September 2003, although he quickly moved to Motherwell. Dair joined Livingston on a one-year contract at the start of the 2004–05 season, extending his stay by a second year in June 2005. Upon his contract expiry, he was released by Livi and made a brief return to Stark's Park in September 2006 when he played 72 minutes for Raith as a trialist against Alloa. The following week, he moved to East Fife, where he went on to play nine times during the season.

== Coaching career ==
Dair took up a coaching role at East Fife and replaced Scott Crabbe as assistant manager prior to the 2010/11 season. He was appointed manager of Junior club Oakley United in May 2012 however he resigned from this position in May 2014. In December 2015, Dair was appointed assistant manager to Colin Nish at Scottish League One side Cowdenbeath, the two having previously played together whilst at Dunfermline Athletic. With Nish being sacked following Cowdenbeath's relegation to Scottish League Two, Dair was appointed caretaker manager pending the appointment of a new manager. After Liam Fox was appointed head coach, Dair left the Blue Brazil at the start of the 2016–17 season.

In June 2019, Dair left his position as manager of Dundonald Bluebell to return to former club Dunfermline Athletic with former teammate Stevie Crawford as manager. Dair took up the role of first team coach having previously been Crawford's assistant at East Fife. Following the resignation of Crawford in May 2021, Dair also left the club shortly after.

== Personal life ==
He is the nephew of legendary Rangers wing half Jim Baxter.

== Honours ==
Raith Rovers

- Scottish League Cup: 1994–95
- Scottish First Division: 1992–93, 1994–95

East Fife

- Fife Cup: 2007–08
