= 1994–95 Partick Thistle F.C. season =

Partick Thistle
1994–95 season
- Manager: John Lambie
- Stadium: Firhill Stadium
- Scottish Premier Division: 8th
- Scottish Cup: Third round
- Scottish League Cup: Third round

During the 1994–95 season, Partick Thistle competed in the Scottish Premier Division, in which they finished 8th.

== Scottish Premier Division ==
=== League table ===
Pos	Team	Pld	W	D	L	GF	GA	GD	Pts	Qualification or relegation
6	Heart of Midlothian	36	12	7	17	44	51	−7	43	
7	Kilmarnock	36	11	10	15	40	48	−8	43	
8	Partick Thistle	36	10	13	13	40	50	−10	43	Qualification for the Intertoto Cup group stage (Note: Partick Thistle qualified for the 1995 UEFA Intertoto Cup as the highest ranked Scottish club to apply for a place in the competition.)
9	Aberdeen (O)	36	10	11	15	43	46	−3	41	Qualification for the Play-off
10	Dundee United (R)	36	9	9	18	40	56	−16	36	Relegation to the 1995–96 Scottish First Division

Updated to match(es) played on end of season. Source: Soccerbase
Rules for classification: 1) Points; 2) Goal difference; 3) Goals scored
(O) Play-off winners; (R) Relegated

=== Matches ===
Win	Draw	Loss

Scottish Premier Division results
Date	Opponent	Venue	Result F–A	Scorers	Attendance
13 August 1994	Kilmarnock	H	2–0	McWilliams, English	6,606
20 August 1994	Rangers	H	0–2		14,361
27 August 1994	Falkirk	A	1–2	Grant	5,402
10 September 1994	Celtic	H	1–2	Grant	14,439
17 September 1994	Aberdeen	A	1–1	Charnley	10,425
24 September 1994	Motherwell	H	2–2	Grant, McDonald	4,786
1 October 1994	Hibernian	A	0–3		7,083
8 October 1994	Heart of Midlothian	H	0–1		5,076
15 October 1994	Dundee United	A	1–0	Cameron	6,687
22 October 1994	Kilmarnock	A	0–2		7,023
29 October 1994	Falkirk	H	1–2	Grant	4,215
5 November 1994	Rangers	A	0–3		43,696
9 November 1994	Celtic	A	0–0		21,462
19 November 1994	Aberdeen	H	2–1	Craig. Gibson	3,795
26 November 1994	Motherwell	A	1–3	Cameron	6,893
3 December 1994	Hibernian	H	2–2	Foster, English	4,667
26 December 1994	Heart of Midlothian	A	0–3		8,920
31 December 1994	Kilmarnock	H	2–2	McDonald (2)	5,799
7 January 1995	Rangers	H	1–1	Taylor	17,298
14 January 1995	Aberdeen	A	1–3	Pittman	9,833
17 January 1995	Falkirk	A	3–1	Dinnie, Foster, McWilliams	3,958
21 January 1995	Celtic	H	0–0		11,904
4 February 1995	Hibernian	A	2–1	Turner, McDonald	7,760
25 February 1995	Dundee United	A	0–2		7,227
7 March 1995	Dundee United	H	2–0	Smith, Foster	2,126
11 March 1995	Aberdeen	H	2–2	Pittman, Turner	6,886
14 March 1995	Motherwell	H	0–0		3,525
1 April 1995	Hibernian	H	2–2	Foster (2, 1 pen.)	4,041
4 April 1995	Heart of Midlothian	H	3–1	Pittman, McDonald, McWilliams	4,526
8 April 1995	Motherwell	A	2–1	Cameron, Craig	9,631
15 April 1995	Heart of Midlothian	A	1–0	Dinnie	9,007
18 April 1995	Dundee United	H	1–3	Pittman	4,962
29 April 1995	Kilmarnock	A	0–0		9,201
2 May 1995	Celtic	A	3–1	Grant, Foster (2)	18,963
6 May 1995	Falkirk	H	0–0		5,927
13 May 1995	Rangers	A	1–1	Taylor	45,280

== Scottish Cup ==
Win	Draw	Loss

Scottish Cup results
Round	Date	Opponent	Venue	Result F–A	Scorers	Attendance
Third round	29 January 1995	Dundee	A	1–2	Craig	6,320

== Scottish League Cup ==
Win	Draw	Loss

Scottish League Cup results
Round	Date	Opponent	Venue	Result F–A	Scorers	Attendance
Second round	16 August 1994	Brechin City	H	5–0	Taylor, Jamieson, Charnley (3, 1 pen.)	1,970
Third round	30 August 1994	Aberdeen	H	0–5		5,046
