= Shaun Dennis =

Scottish footballer and coach (1969–2025)

Personal information
- Date of birth: 20 December 1969
- Place of birth: Kirkcaldy, Scotland
- Date of death: 16 May 2025 (aged 55)
- Position: Defender

Senior career*
Years	Team	Apps	(Gls)
1988–1997	Raith Rovers	245	(6)
1997–2001	Hibernian	64	(4)
2000	→ Raith Rovers (loan)	12	(0)
2001–2004	Raith Rovers	87	(5)
2004	→ Brechin City (loan)	5	(0)
2004–2005	Raith Rovers	12	(0)

International career
1991	Scotland U21	1	(0)

Managerial career
- 2004: Raith Rovers (caretaker)
- * Club domestic league appearances and goals

Shaun Dennis (20 December 1969 – 16 May 2025) was a Scottish professional football player and coach, primarily with Raith Rovers. A defender, he was capped by Scotland at under-21 level.

== Club career ==
Shaun Dennis made his debut for Raith Rovers in 1988 and stayed at the club until 1997, when he joined Hibernian. He scored a penalty kick in the 1994 Scottish League Cup Final win over Celtic at Ibrox Stadium. He also played in Raith's subsequent UEFA Cup run the following year. Dennis also scored Raith's first goal in the Scottish Premier Division, against St Johnstone in August 1993, in a 1–1 draw.

Dennis won the Scottish First Division championship in 1998–99 and played in 64 games for Hibernian before returning to Raith on loan for three months in September 2000. He signed a permanent contract at Raith in the summer of 2001, staying for three years, winning the Second Division title in the process. Dennis signed for Brechin City in 2004, but returned to Raith again in October, before retiring due to a recurring knee injury.

In total, Dennis played in over 400 games for Raith. On 6 November 2017, he was inducted into the Raith Rovers Hall of Fame at a ceremony at the Adam Smith Theatre, Kirkcaldy.

== International career ==
Dennis made one appearance for the Scotland under-21 team, a 3–0 win against Switzerland in Bulle on 10 September 1991.

== Coaching career ==
Towards the end of his playing career, Dennis became a coach with Raith. During his loan at Brechin, he took over as caretaker manager of Raith in September 2004 when Claude Anelka stood down as head coach.

== Death ==
Dennis died on 16 May 2025, at the age of 55.

== Honours ==
Raith Rovers

- Scottish League Cup: 1994–95
- Scottish League First Division: 1992–93, 1994–95
- Scottish League Second Division: 2002–03

Individual

- Raith Rovers Hall of Fame
