= Scott Y. Thomson =

Scottish footballer

Scott Thomson
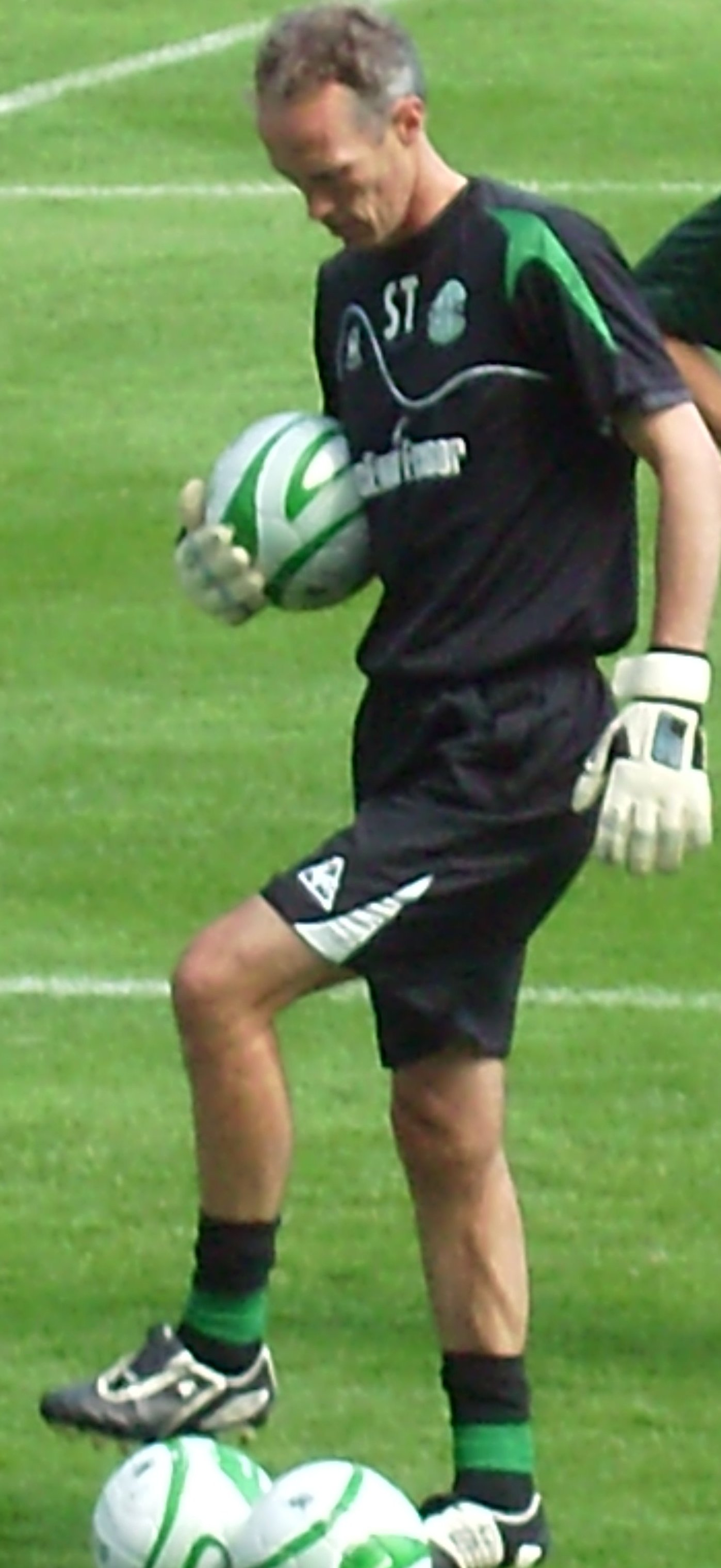
- Thomson as Hibernian goalkeeping coach in 2009

Personal information
- Full name: Scott Yuill Thomson
- Date of birth: 8 November 1966 (age 59)
- Place of birth: Edinburgh, Scotland
- Position: Goalkeeper

Team information
- Current team: Ross County (goalkeeping coach)

Youth career
- 1984: Hutchison Vale

Senior career*
Years	Team	Apps	(Gls)
1984–1991	Dundee United	6	(0)
1991	→ Raith Rovers (loan)	1	(0)
1991–1993	Forfar Athletic	88	(0)
1993–1997	Raith Rovers	122	(0)
1997–1998	Hull City	9	(0)
1998	→ Motherwell (loan)	1	(0)
1998–2000	Airdrieonians	30	(0)
2000–2005	Dunfermline Athletic	11	(0)
2003	→ Brechin City (loan)	14	(0)
Total		282	(0)
- * Club domestic league appearances and goals

Scott Yuill Thomson (born 8 November 1966) is a Scottish former professional football goalkeeper, who played mainly for Raith Rovers and won the 1994 Scottish League Cup Final when the Stark's Park club defeated Celtic at Ibrox Park. Since retiring as a player, he has worked as a goalkeeping coach.

== Playing career ==
Thomson started his professional career at Dundee United. He made his first team debut on 2 May 1987 in a 2–1 victory at Tannadice against Hibernian, but went on to play just five other first team games for the club before being loaned out to Barnsley. He signed for Forfar Athletic in 1991 before joining Raith Rovers in 1993.

During his time at Stark's Park, Thomson played in over 100 first team games, winning the Scottish Football League First Division and Scottish League Cup. Thomson famously saved the decisive penalty kick from Paul McStay in the 1994 Scottish League Cup Final. Thomson had been sent off in the semi-final against Airdrieonians; substitute Brian Potter saved a penalty that allowed Raith to progress to the final. Thomson played a key role as Raith set up a lucrative UEFA Cup tie against Bayern Munich.

Thomson went on to have spells at Hull City, then a loan spell from the English club at Motherwell, before joining Airdrieonians in 1998. Thomson finished his career playing at Dunfermline Athletic, where he played alongside Scott M. Thomson (as had briefly been the case at Raith), although part of his final season was at Brechin City on loan.

== Coaching ==
Thomson was given his first coaching job at Dunfermline Athletic while still technically registered as a player. At East End Park Thomson forged a special bond with striker Craig Brewster and goalkeeper Derek Stillie and later joined them both at Tannadice when the striker was appointed player-manager of Dundee United. Thomson remained as goalkeeping coach under Craig Levein after the departure of Brewster and Stillie. Thomson was released from his contract in May 2009 after Levein stated his intention to appoint an experienced player who could also coach, rather than a specialist coach like Thomson. Thomson was then hired by Hibernian to serve as their goalkeeping coach, replacing Gordon Marshall. Thomson departed Hibernian in the summer of 2014 and subsequently joined Ross County.

== Personal life ==
He is the father of current Falkirk and former Raith Rovers goalkeeper coach Robbie Thomson.

== Honours ==
Raith Rovers

- Scottish League Cup: 1994–95
- Scottish League First Division: 1994–95

Individual

- Raith Rovers Hall of Fame
