= 1994–95 Scottish Premier Division =

89th season of top-tier football league in Scotland

Scottish Premier Division
- Season: 1994–95
- Dates: 13 August 1994 – 13 May 1995
- Champions: Rangers; 10th Premier Division title 45th Scottish title
- Relegated: Dundee United
- Champions League: Rangers
- UEFA Cup: Motherwell
- Cup Winners' Cup: Celtic
- Goals: 453
- Average goals/game: 2.52
- Top goalscorer: Tommy Coyne (16)
- Biggest home win: Hibernian 5–0 Dundee United (13 August); Dundee United 6–1 Motherwell (21 January)
- Biggest away win: Dundee United 0–3 Rangers (4 December)

The 1994–95 Scottish Premier Division season began on 13 August 1994; it was the first season of the new ten team league format, and also the first season using the rule of awarding three points for a win.

== Overview ==
The 1994–95 Scottish Premier Division season ended in success for Rangers who won the title by fifteen points from nearest rivals Motherwell to clinch seven titles in a row. Dundee United were relegated to the First Division after finishing bottom with Aberdeen surviving a relegation playoff against Dunfermline Athletic. As champions, Rangers qualified for the Champions League while Motherwell were joined by League Cup winners Raith Rovers in qualifying for the UEFA Cup. Fourth-placed Celtic qualified for the Cup Winners' Cup as Scottish Cup winners.

The season began on 13 August with the first goal of the season scored by Hibernian's Billy Findlay as they won 5–0 at home to Dundee United. The regular league season ended on 13 May, with the relegation/promotion play-off following on the 21st and 25th.

== Clubs ==
=== Promotion and relegation from 1993–94 ===
Promoted from First Division to Premier League

- Falkirk

Relegated from Premier Division to First Division

- St Johnstone
- Raith Rovers
- Dundee

=== Stadia and locations ===
Location of clubs in the 1994–95 Scottish Premier Division

Team	Location	Stadium
Aberdeen	Aberdeen	Pittodrie Stadium
Celtic	Parkhead, Glasgow	Hampden Park
Dundee United	Dundee	Tannadice Park
Falkirk	Falkirk	Brockville Park
Heart of Midlothian	Gorgie, Edinburgh	Tynecastle Park
Hibernian	Leith, Edinburgh	Easter Road
Kilmarnock	Kilmarnock	Rugby Park
Motherwell	Motherwell	Fir Park
Partick Thistle	Maryhill, Glasgow	Firhill Stadium
Rangers	Ibrox, Glasgow	Ibrox Park

=== Managers ===
Team	Manager
Aberdeen	(Scotland) Roy Aitken
Celtic	(Scotland) Tommy Burns
Dundee United	(Scotland) Billy Kirkwood
Falkirk	(Scotland) Jim Jefferies
Heart of Midlothian	(Scotland) Tommy McLean
Hibernian	(Scotland) Alex Miller
Kilmarnock	(Scotland) Alex Totten
Motherwell	(Scotland) Alex McLeish
Partick Thistle	(Scotland) John Lambie
Rangers	(Scotland) Walter Smith

==== Managerial changes ====
Team	Outgoing manager	Date of vacancy	Manner of departure	Incoming manager	Date of appointment
Motherwell	(Scotland) Tommy McLean	11 June 1994	Resigned	(Scotland) Alex McLeish	11 June 1994
Celtic	(Scotland) Lou Macari	16 June 1994	Sacked	(Scotland) Tommy Burns	12 July 1994
Heart of Midlothian	(Scotland) Sandy Clark	20 June 1994	Sacked	(Scotland) Tommy McLean	1 July 1994
Kilmarnock	(Scotland) Tommy Burns	12 July 1994	Signed by Celtic	(Scotland) Alex Totten	July 1994
Aberdeen	(Scotland) Willie Miller	6 February 1995	Sacked	(Scotland) Roy Aitken	6 February 1995
Dundee United	(Federal Republic of Yugoslavia) Ivan Golac	14 March 1995	Sacked	(Scotland) Billy Kirkwood	28 March 1995

== League table ==
Pos	Team	Pld	W	D	L	GF	GA	GD	Pts	Qualification or relegation
1	Rangers (C)	36	20	9	7	60	35	+25	69	Qualification for the Champions League qualifying round
2	Motherwell	36	14	12	10	50	50	0	54	Qualification for the UEFA Cup preliminary round
3	Hibernian	36	12	17	7	49	37	+12	53	
4	Celtic	36	11	18	7	39	33	+6	51	Qualification for the Cup Winners' Cup first round (Note: Celtic qualified for the 1995–96 UEFA Cup Winners' Cup by winning the 1994–95 Scottish Cup.)
5	Falkirk	36	12	12	12	48	47	+1	48	
6	Heart of Midlothian	36	12	7	17	44	51	−7	43	
7	Kilmarnock	36	11	10	15	40	48	−8	43	
8	Partick Thistle	36	10	13	13	40	50	−10	43	Qualification for the Intertoto Cup group stage (Note: Partick Thistle qualified for the 1995 UEFA Intertoto Cup as the highest ranked Scottish club to apply for a place in the competition.)
9	Aberdeen (O)	36	10	11	15	43	46	−3	41	Qualification for the Play-off
10	Dundee United (R)	36	9	9	18	40	56	−16	36	Relegation to the 1995–96 Scottish First Division

Updated to match(es) played on end of season. Source: Soccerbase
Rules for classification: 1) Points; 2) Goal difference; 3) Goals scored
(C) Champions; (O) Play-off winners; (R) Relegated

== Results ==
=== Matches 1–18 ===
During matches 1-18 each team plays every other team twice (home and away).

Home \ Away	ABE	CEL	DUN	FAL	HOM	HIB	KIL	MOT	PAR	RAN
Aberdeen		0–0	3–0	2–2	3–1	0–0	0–1	1–3	1–1	2–2
Celtic	0–0		2–1	0–2	3–0	3–0	1–1	2–2	0–0	1–3
Dundee United	2–1	2–2		1–0	5–2	0–0	2–2	1–1	0–1	0–3
Falkirk	2–1	1–1	1–3		2–1	0–0	3–3	0–1	2–1	0–2
Heart of Midlothian	2–0	1–0	2–1	1–1		0–1	3–0	1–2	3–0	1–1
Hibernian	2–2	0–2	5–0	2–2	2–1		0–0	2–2	3–0	2–1
Kilmarnock	2–1	0–0	0–2	1–1	3–1	0–0		0–1	2–0	1–2
Motherwell	0–1	1–1	1–1	5–3	1–1	1–1	3–2		3–1	2–1
Partick Thistle	2–1	1–2	2–0	1–2	0–1	2–2	2–0	2–2		0–2
Rangers	1–0	0–2	2–0	1–1	3–0	2–0	2–0	2–1	3–0	

Source: RSSSF
Legend: Blue = home team win; Yellow = draw; Red = away team win.

=== Matches 19–36 ===
During matches 19-36 each team plays every other team a further two times (home and away).

Home \ Away	ABE	CEL	DUN	FAL	HOM	HIB	KIL	MOT	PAR	RAN
Aberdeen		2–0	2–1	0–0	3–1	0–0	0–1	0–2	3–1	2–0
Celtic	2–0		1–1	2–0	1–1	1–1	2–1	1–1	1–3	3–0
Dundee United	0–0	0–1		1–0	1–1	0–1	1–2	6–1	2–0	0–2
Falkirk	0–2	1–2	3–1		2–0	1–0	2–0	3–0	1–3	2–3
Heart of Midlothian	1–2	0–1	2–0	0–1		2–0	2–2	2–0	0–1	2–1
Hibernian	4–2	0–2	4–0	0–2	3–1		2–1	2–0	1–2	1–1
Kilmarnock	3–1	0–1	2–0	2–1	3–2	1–2		2–0	0–0	0–1
Motherwell	2–1	1–0	2–1	2–2	1–2	0–0	2–0		1–2	1–3
Partick Thistle	2–2	0–0	1–3	0–0	3–1	2–2	2–2	0–0		1–1
Rangers	3–2	1–1	1–1	2–2	1–0	3–1	3–0	0–2	1–1	

Source: RSSSF
Legend: Blue = home team win; Yellow = draw; Red = away team win.

== Play-off ==
A two leg play-off took place between the 9th placed team in the Premier Division (Aberdeen) and the runner-up of the First Division (Dunfermline Athletic). Aberdeen won both legs by 3 goals to 1, winning the tie 6–2 on aggregate, thus securing their place in the 1995–96 Scottish Premier Division.

== Top scorers ==
Player	Goals	Team
(Republic of Ireland) Tommy Coyne	16	Motherwell
(Scotland) Billy Dodds	15	Aberdeen
(England) Mark Hateley	13	Rangers

Source:=https://www.rsssf.org/tabless/scot95.html RSSSF

== Awards ==
- Player awards

Award	Winner	Club
PFA Players' Player of the Year	(Denmark) Brian Laudrup	Rangers
PFA Young Player of the Year	(Scotland) Charlie Miller	Rangers
SFWA Footballer of the Year	(Denmark) Brian Laudrup	Rangers

- Manager awards

Award	Winner	Club
SFWA Manager of the Year	(Scotland) Jimmy Nicholl	Raith Rovers

== See also ==
- 1994–95 in Scottish football
- 1994–95 Dundee United F.C. season
- 1994–95 Rangers F.C. season
- Nine in a row
