= David Sinclair (footballer, born 1969) =

Scottish footballer

Personal information
- Full name: David Sinclair
- Date of birth: 6 October 1969 (age 57)
- Place of birth: Dunfermline, Scotland
- Height: 5 ft 11 in (1.80 m)
- Position: Defender

Senior career*
Years	Team	Apps	(Gls)
1990–1996	Raith Rovers	176	(1)
1992	→ Portadown (loan)		
1996–1997	Millwall	8	(0)
1997–1998	Dundee United	10	(0)
1998	→ Livingston (loan)	5	(0)
1998–2000	Falkirk	45	(1)
2000	Forfar Athletic	2	(1)
2001	Hill of Beath Hawthorn		
- * Club domestic league appearances and goals

David Sinclair (born 6 October 1969) is a Scottish former footballer who played in defence.

== Career ==
Sinclair made most of his career appearances at Raith Rovers, where he picked up two Scottish First Division title medals, plus a League Cup winner's medal. After making over 175 league appearances for Raith, Sinclair failed to make even half that at a number of other clubs, retiring in 2001.

After the League Cup victory Raith Rovers manager Jimmy Nicholl is quoted to have said "Even Davie Sinclair was crying and he's so tough he's got tattoos on his teeth".

== Honours ==
Raith Rovers

- Scottish League Cup: 1994–95
- Scottish First Division: 1992–93, 1994–95

== Personal life ==
Sinclair was brought up in the village of High Valleyfield.
