= Steve McAnespie =

Scottish footballer and manager

Personal information
- Full name: Stephen McAnespie
- Date of birth: 1 February 1972 (age 54)
- Place of birth: Kilmarnock, Scotland
- Position: Right back

Youth career
- 1988–1991: Aberdeen

Senior career*
Years	Team	Apps	(Gls)
1991–1993	Aberdeen	0	(0)
1993–1994	Västerhaninge IF		
1994–1995	Raith Rovers	40	(0)
1995–1997	Bolton Wanderers	24	(0)
1997–2000	Fulham	7	(0)
1998	→ Bradford City (loan)	7	(0)
2000–2002	Cambridge United	24	(0)
2002	Partick Thistle	1	(0)
Total		103	(0)

Managerial career
- 2005–2007: Indiana Invaders
- * Club domestic league appearances and goals

Stephen McAnespie (born 1 February 1972) is a Scottish football coach and former professional football.

As a player, he was a defender who notably played in the Premier League for Bolton Wanderers and in the Scottish Premiership for Aberdeen, Raith Rovers and Partick Thistle. He also played in the Football League with Fulham, Bradford City and Cambridge United.

Following retirement, McAnespie emigrated to the United States and worked as assistant coach of the New Orleans Shell Shockers before taking over as head coach of the Indiana Invaders in 2005.

== Playing career ==
Born in Kilmarnock, McAnespie started his career with Aberdeen, although failed to make a senior appearance during his time at Pittodrie.

In 1994, after five years with Aberdeen, he signed for Raith Rovers, with whom he won the Scottish League Cup within a matter of months, going on to also win the Scottish First Division. He also featured in the early stages of Raith's maiden European campaign.

McAnespie moved to Bolton Wanderers in September 1995 for £900,000 (to this day a record transfer fee received by Raith Rovers), featuring in around a dozen matches as Bolton were relegated to the Football League First Division. McAnespie featured in a similar number of matches as Bolton gained promotion at the first attempt, winning the title by eighteen points. He played in a handful of matches at the start of the 1997–98 season.

McAnespie dropped down to the Football League Second Division in November 1997 to join Fulham in a £100,000 deal. After three years with the London side, McAnespie made just seven league appearances, playing in just three matches of Fulham's title-winning 1998–99 season, having spent part of the previous season on loan at Bradford City.

At the start of the 2000–01 season, McAnespie joined Cambridge United on a free transfer.

He joined Partick Thistle on a similar deal in March 2002, weeks before Cambridge's relegation from the Football League Second Division, and played a small part in Partick's Scottish First Division title win.

== Coaching career ==
He then moved to the US to coach football. While he was assistant coach of the New Orleans Shell Shockers, he had to be rescued from the impact of Hurricane Katrina. He later became the head coach of the Indiana Invaders.

McAnespie moved to New Orleans as head coach at Brother Martin High School.

== Honours ==
Raith Rovers

- Scottish First Division: 1994–95
- Scottish League Cup: 1994–95

Bolton Wanderers

- Football League First Division: 1996–97
