= Ally Graham =

Scottish footballer

Personal information
- Full name: Alistair Slowey Graham
- Date of birth: 11 August 1966 (age 60)
- Place of birth: Glasgow, Scotland
- Height: 6 ft 3 in (1.91 m)
- Position: Striker

Youth career
- Anniesland United

Senior career*
Years	Team	Apps	(Gls)
1984–1987	Clydebank	3	(0)
1985	→ Stenhousemuir (loan)	1	(0)
1987–1990	Albion Rovers	98	(33)
1990–1993	Ayr United	108	(35)
1993	Motherwell	9	(2)
1993–1996	Raith Rovers	88	(17)
1996–1997	Falkirk	15	(0)
1997	Partick Thistle	4	(0)
1997	Albion Rovers	2	(1)
1997–1998	Ayr United	12	(2)
1998	Clyde	15	(7)
1998	TPV Tampere	14	(8)
1998–2001	Stirling Albion	85	(44)
2001–2002	Clydebank	21	(2)
2002–2003	Hamilton Academical	28	(5)
2003–2005	Queen's Park	48	(9)
2005–2006	East Stirlingshire	14	(2)
Total		565	(161)
- * Club domestic league appearances and goals

Alistair Slowey Graham (born 11 August 1966) is a Scottish former professional footballer who played as a striker.

== Career ==
Raised in the Royston area of Glasgow, Graham began his professional career in 1984 with Clydebank, making three appearances for the Bankies, also playing a game on loan for Stenhousemuir. Graham's move to Albion Rovers in 1987 saw him win the Second Division, playing over 100 matches in a three-year spell. He played a similar number of games with Ayr United after moving in 1990, scoring over thirty league goals in his time there.

In February 1993, Graham's form won him a move to Premier Division side Motherwell, but by the end of the year he had moved on to fellow top tier side Raith Rovers. Graham's time at Raith was rewarding: although relegated in their first season, the Kirkcaldy side won the League Cup a few months later, providing European football for the first time, and were also promoted as First Division winners. Graham played in Raith's European campaign the following season, leaving at the end of the league season to join Falkirk. His time at Brockville was brief and he ended up playing for Partick Thistle and Albion Rovers within the same season.

Short spells at Ayr United, Clyde and Finland's TPV Tampere followed before a longer period of three years with Stirling Albion. Graham saw out his career with a second spell at Clydebank, as well as at Hamilton Academical, Queen's Park and East Stirlingshire.

He later worked as a coach at Albion Rovers and with East Kilbride, as a newspaper match reporter for the Scottish lower leagues, and away from football as a Royal Mail postman.

== Honours ==
Albion Rovers

- Scottish Second Division: 1988–89

Ayr United

- Scottish Challenge Cup runner-up: 1990–91, 1991–92

Raith Rovers

- Scottish League Cup: 1994–95
- Scottish First Division: 1994–95

== See also ==
- List of footballers in Scotland by number of league appearances (500+)
