= Brian Potter =

Brian Potter may refer to:

- Brian Potter (character), a fictional character played by Peter Kay
- Brian Potter (musician) (1939–2026), British-born American pop music songwriter and record producer
- Brian Potter (footballer) (born 1977), former Scottish footballer
