= Jason Rowbotham =

Welsh footballer

Personal information
- Full name: Jason Rowbotham
- Date of birth: 3 January 1969 (age 57)
- Place of birth: Cardiff, Wales
- Position: Left back

Senior career*
Years	Team	Apps	(Gls)
1987–1992	Plymouth Argyle	9	(0)
1992	Shrewsbury Town	0	(0)
1992–1993	Hereford	5	(1)
1993–1995	Raith Rovers	56	(1)
1995–1997	Wycombe Wanderers	27	(0)
1996	→ Plymouth Argyle (loan)	3	(0)
1997–2000	Plymouth Argyle	51	(1)
2000–2001	Torquay United	5	(0)
2001–2002	Weymouth		
2002	Merthyr Tydfil		
Total		156	(3)

International career
- Wales youth
- * Club domestic league appearances and goals

Jason Rowbotham (born 3 January 1969) is a Welsh former professional footballer, who played as a left back.

== Career ==
Rowbotham began his professional career in 1987 with Plymouth Argyle, spending five years at Home Park. In 1992, a move to Shrewsbury Town yielded no appearances and Rowbotham quickly moved on, to Hereford. After just five appearances, Rowbotham headed north to Kirkcaldy with Raith Rovers in July 1993 and started the most successful period of his career. In his three years with Rovers, Rowbotham suffered relegation from the Premier Division but won the resulting First Division, with a League Cup win in between. Rowbotham was also part of Raith's only season in Europe. Shortly after Rovers' First Division win, Rowbotham moved back to England with Wycombe Wanderers in a £40,000 deal. In his two years at Adams Park, Rowbotham featured in over thirty matches and after a loan spell with first club Plymouth, returned to the club for a second permanent spell in 1997. Following his release in 2000, Rowbotham played a handful of matches for Torquay United on a non-contract basis before leaving in January 2001 and finishing his career in non-league football with Weymouth and Merthyr Tydfil.

== Honours ==
Raith Rovers

- Scottish League Cup: 1994–95
- Scottish First Division: 1994–95
