= Julian Broddle =

English footballer

Personal information
- Full name: Julian Raymond Broddle
- Date of birth: 1 November 1964 (age 62)
- Place of birth: Laughton-en-le-Morthen, England
- Height: 5 ft 11 in (1.80 m)
- Position: Left back

Senior career*
Years	Team	Apps	(Gls)
1981–1983	Sheffield United	1	(0)
1983–1987	Scunthorpe United	134	(32)
1987–1990	Barnsley	77	(4)
1990	Plymouth Argyle	9	(0)
1990–1992	St Mirren	59	(2)
1992–1993	→ Scunthorpe United (loan)	6	(0)
1992	Partick Thistle	5	(0)
1993–1996	Raith Rovers	73	(1)
1996	East Fife	6	(0)
1996–1997	Ross County	29	(0)
Total		399	(39)
- * Club domestic league appearances and goals

Julian Raymond Broddle (born 1 November 1964) is an English former professional footballer who played as a left back.

== Career ==
Broddle began his professional career with Sheffield United and won promotion with the club in 1981–82, although played just once for the first team. In 1983, he moved to Scunthorpe United, where he would become one of Scunthorpe's top 25 scorers of all time over a four-year period. Broddle scored his very first goal against Sheffield United at Bramall Lane on his Birthday, and went on to score 50 goals in his career. A three-year spell with Barnsley followed in 1987 before a year at Plymouth Argyle having been sold to Plymouth Argyle by Barnsley for £16000. In December 1990, Broddle moved to Scottish side St Mirren, spending eighteen months with the Paisley outfit. During his time at Love Street, he had a brief loan spell back at Scunthorpe United before returning to Scotland and joining Partick Thistle until the end of the season.

Broddle moved to Kirkcaldy with Raith Rovers in July 1993 and started the most successful period of his career. In his three years with Rovers, Broddle suffered relegation from the Premier Division but won the resulting First Division, with a League Cup win in between. Broddle was also part of Raith's only season in Europe where Raith Rovers beat two European clubs before going out to the eventual winners, Bayern Munich. After being released at Raith Rovers when the management changed, Broddle had a short spell with East Fife, where East Fife gained promotion, not losing a single game during the time Broddle played for Steve Archbolds team. Broddle spent the remainder of his career, at Ross County. Broddle's affinity with Raith Rovers was demonstrated in 2005 when he put his name forward to help during Raith's financial struggle.

Broddle retired in 1998 after having played 399 league matches during his career, and including FA Cup and League Cup, scored a total of 50 goals. He became a policeman, and was put forward for commendation in December 2001 after saving the life of a teenage girl. Broddle received further commendation for "courage and commitment during routine duties" after his police car was attacked in Farnworth in 2008. This award, along with many others acquired over the years, are he states, very proud of all awards he has been given.

== Outside football ==
After ending his playing career, Broddle joined the police service. Broddle has served with Greater Manchester Police, Nottinghamshire Police and South Yorkshire Police.

Since leaving the police service, Julian Broddle has written an autobiography of his football and police career called Down the Line.

== Honours ==
Sheffield United

- Fourth Division: 1981–82

Raith Rovers

- Scottish League Cup: 1994–95
- Scottish First Division: 1994–95
