= Stevie Crawford =

Scottish association football player and manager

Personal information
- Full name: Stephen Crawford
- Date of birth: 9 January 1974 (age 52)
- Place of birth: Dunfermline, Scotland
- Position: Striker

Senior career*
Years	Team	Apps	(Gls)
1992–1996	Raith Rovers	115	(22)
1996–1997	Millwall	42	(11)
1997–2000	Hibernian	73	(23)
1999–2000	→ Dunfermline Athletic (loan)	25	(16)
2000–2004	Dunfermline Athletic	144	(47)
2004–2005	Plymouth Argyle	26	(6)
2005	Dundee United	21	(3)
2005–2006	Aberdeen	34	(8)
2006–2008	Dunfermline Athletic	59	(8)
2008–2011	East Fife	50	(10)
2011	Cowdenbeath	18	(2)
2011	Forfar Athletic	11	(2)
Total		618	(158)

International career
1995–2004	Scotland	25	(4)

Managerial career
- 2009–2010: East Fife (player/manager)
- 2019–2021: Dunfermline Athletic
- 2021–2022: East Fife
- 2023-2024: Rosyth
- 2024: Cowdenbeath (interim)
- * Club domestic league appearances and goals

Stephen Crawford (born 9 January 1974) is a Scottish professional football coach and former player. He was most recently the interim manager of Lowland League club Cowdenbeath.

Crawford started his career with Raith Rovers, with whom he won the 1994 Scottish League Cup final and played in the UEFA Cup. This earned him a move to English football with Millwall, but Crawford returned to Scotland after just one year. He had a mixed spell with Hibernian, suffering relegation but then winning promotion. Crawford then had the most productive spell of his career with Dunfermline Athletic, during which time he became a Scotland regular, amassing 25 caps in total. Crawford played in three Scottish Cup Finals (two for Dunfermline and one for Dundee United) in the mid-2000s, losing all three to Celtic. Crawford's stint with Dundee United came after a short-lived return to English football with Plymouth Argyle.

After short spells with Aberdeen and Dunfermline Athletic, Crawford signed for lower division club East Fife in 2008. He served East Fife as player/manager for just over a year before resigning as manager in October 2010. After stints as an assistant manager at Falkirk, Hearts and Milton Keynes Dons, he managed Dunfermline Athletic for two years. After a second spell as East Fife manager, Crawford joined Dundee United as assistant manager in September 2022 but that spell at Tannadice didn't last and both Crawford and Liam Fox were sacked in February 2023.

In August 2023 he became manager of Rosyth as he replaced outgoing head coach Greig Denham who resigned at the east of Scotland outfits.

== Domestic career ==
=== 1990s ===
Crawford, who plays as a striker, began his career with Raith Rovers in 1992. Raith beat Celtic in a penalty shootout in the 1994 Scottish League Cup final and Crawford scored one of Raith's goals in the final. Raith also played in the UEFA Cup against Bayern Munich.

After the 1995–96 season, Crawford moved on to Millwall, where he spent a single season and scored 11 goals. Hibernian signed Crawford in 1997, but were relegated from the top division before winning promotion back to the Scottish Premier League in 1999. Crawford moved to Dunfermline Athletic on loan for the 1999–2000 season, scoring 16 goals in 25 games.

=== Dunfermline Athletic ===
Crawford signed for the Fife side permanently in July 2000 after a successful loan in the previous season. His first goal for the Pars came on 12 August 2000 against St Johnstone. Crawford was Dunfermline's top scorer in his first season at East End Park, scoring 9 goals in 37 league matches. The next season was just as successful for Crawford in goalscoring terms and his goals elevated Dunfermline to finishing sixth in the league. His goal in the final game of the season against Rangers earned his side a 1–1 draw. The 2002–03 season was perhaps Crawford's best season with the Pars. The third game of the season saw him score a hat-trick against Dundee leading to him challenging for top scorer of the season with 19 goals in 35 games. Crawford's goals again helped the Pars move up the league, helping them finish fifth overall.

His final season at Dunfermline was the club most successful season in a number of years, which saw them finish 4th thanks to Crawford's 13 goals. This not only saw his side qualify for the UEFA Cup, but he also helped the Pars reach the 2004 Scottish Cup final, which they lost 3–1 to Celtic. It was at this time that Crawford decided he wanted to leave Dunfermline to sign for a club in England.

=== Plymouth and Dundee United ===
Crawford signed for Football League Championship side Plymouth Argyle in 2004. He failed to settle in England due to his homesickness. After only six months he returned to Scotland, signing with Dundee United for a £80,000 fee. His time at Tannadice was equally short-lived, although he did earn another Scottish Cup runners-up medal, as United lost the 2005 Scottish Cup final to Celtic.

=== Aberdeen and return to Dunfermline ===
After joining Aberdeen at the start of the 2005–06 season, Crawford returned to Dunfermline in August 2006, despite being a regular starter at Pittodrie and among the top league scorers at the time. He signed a two-year deal with his hometown team but failed to be as productive as he had been in his first spell with Dunfermline, scoring only 8 goals in two seasons. He helped Dunfermline reach the 2007 Scottish Cup final in which he played as a substitute, however for the third time in four seasons Crawford ended up on the losing side in a Scottish Cup final against Celtic. In April 2008, Crawford was told he would not be offered a new contract and was free to find a new club.

== International career ==
Over the course of his career Crawford won 25 caps for Scotland, scoring 4 goals. He made his debut (and scored) in a Kirin Cup tie in 1995, but did not make another appearance until 2001. Crawford played regularly under the management of Berti Vogts.

== Coaching career ==
It was reported in July 2008 that Crawford had turned down a move to the English Championship in favour of continuing his football in Scotland. Crawford signed a two-year deal with Scottish Second Division side East Fife a few days later. After David Baikie resigned as manager on 14 April 2009, Crawford became caretaker player/manager, and he was given the job on a permanent basis later that month. After just over a year as manager, Crawford resigned as manager of East Fife, but remained with the club as a registered player.

Crawford was appointed assistant manager of Falkirk in October 2011. He moved to a similar position at Hearts in May 2014, working with Robbie Neilson. Neilson and Crawford both moved to English League One side Milton Keynes Dons in December 2016. They both left MK Dons in January 2018, with the team in 21st place in League One.

Crawford then joined Dunfermline Athletic as a coach. He was appointed head coach in January 2019, after Allan Johnston left the club. After over two years in charge of the side, Crawford announced his resignation at the end of the 2020–21 season.

On 30 November 2021, Crawford was announced as the new manager of East Fife. He left this position in September 2022 to become assistant manager to Liam Fox at Dundee United. Crawford left United in March 2023, following the appointment of Jim Goodwin as manager.

== Career statistics ==
=== International ===
Scotland
Year	Apps	Goals
1995	1	1
1996	—	
1997	—	
1998	—	
1999	—	
2000	—	
2001	1	0
2002	5	2
2003	10	1
2004	8	0
Total	25	4

Scores and results list Scotland's goal tally first.

#	Date	Venue	Opponent	Score	Result	Competition
1	24 May 1995	Toyama Park Stadium, Toyama	Ecuador	2–1	2–1	Kirin Cup
2	15 October 2002	Easter Road, Edinburgh	Canada	1–1	3–1	Friendly match
3	15 October 2002	Easter Road, Edinburgh	Canada	3–1	3–1	Friendly match
4	27 May 2003	Tynecastle Stadium, Edinburgh	New Zealand	1–0	1–1	Friendly match

=== Managerial ===
As of match played 24 September 2022

Managerial record by team and tenure
Team	Nat	From	To	Record					Ref.
Team	Nat	From	To	G	W	D	L	Win %	Ref.
East Fife (player/manager)	(Scotland)	14 April 2009	24 October 2010	60	15	17	28	25.00	
Dunfermline Athletic	(Scotland)	10 January 2019	18 May 2021	88	33	21	34	37.50	
East Fife	(Scotland)	30 November 2021	25 September 2022	35	7	9	19	20.00	
Cowdenbeath (interim)	(Scotland)	26 March 2024	present	0	0	0	0	—	
Career Total				183	55	47	81	30.05	—

== Honours ==
=== Club ===
Raith Rovers

- Scottish League Cup: 1994–95
- Scottish First Division: 1992–93, 1994–95

Hibernian

- Scottish First Division: 1998–99

Dunfermline Athletic

- Scottish Cup runner-up: 2003–04, 2006–07

Dundee United

- Scottish Cup runner-up: 2004–05

=== Individual ===
- Scottish First Division Player of the Year: 1999–2000
