= Brian Potter (footballer) =

Scottish footballer

Personal information
- Full name: Brian Potter
- Date of birth: 26 January 1977 (age 49)
- Place of birth: Dunfermline, Scotland
- Height: 5 ft 9 in (1.75 m)
- Position: Goalkeeper

Team information
- Current team: Livingston (goalkeeping coach)

Youth career
- Raith Rovers

Senior career*
| Years | Team | Apps | (Gls) |
| 1994–1995 | Raith Rovers | 1 | (0) |
- Oakley United
| 2008–2011 | Hamilton Academical | 1 | (0) |
| Total | | 2 | (0) |
- * Club domestic league appearances and goals

Brian Potter (born 26 January 1977) is a Scottish former professional footballer who played as a goalkeeper. He is currently employed as the goalkeeping coach at Livingston. Potter is from Valleyfield in Fife.

== Career ==
Potter began his career with Raith Rovers, and was the substitute goalkeeper when Scott Thomson was sent off in the 1994–95 Scottish League Cup semi-final. Despite being a YTS player with only one previous first team appearance, Potter played the remainder of the match, conceding once but surviving to a penalty shoot-out. On the final penalty, Alan Lawrence – who had put Raith out of the Scottish League Challenge Cup earlier in the season in a penalty shoot-out – saw his penalty saved by Potter, putting Raith into the final. First choice Thomson was recalled, coincidentally saving the first sudden death penalty to win the final, allowing Potter to pick up a winners' medal as a substitute. Incredibly, Potter should not have been present at either match – Ray Allan, Raith's backup goalkeeper, was ineligible after being an unused substitute earlier in the competition for Motherwell.

Potter failed to make any further first team appearances for Rovers and joined East Fife as a goalkeeping coach.

After a playing spell in junior football with Oakley United, Potter joined Hamilton Academical as a goalkeeping coach.

Potter was signed as a player by Hamilton in March 2008 to offer cover to their two existing goalkeepers. He had been listed as a trialist substitute on a number of occasions earlier in the season. He made his Hamilton debut, as a substitute, against Dundee in April 2008.

On 12 October 2011 he left Hamilton Academical to sign on as a goalkeeping coach at SPL Dunfermline Athletic.

He was appointed goalkeeping coach at Livingston in June 2024.

== Honours ==
Raith Rovers

- Scottish League Cup: 1994–95
- Scottish First Division: 1994–95
