= 1994–95 Scottish Cup =

Tournament details
- Country: Scotland

Final positions
- Champions: Celtic
- Runners-up: Airdrieonians

The 1994–95 Scottish Cup was the 110th staging of Scotland's most prestigious football knockout competition. The Cup was won by Celtic after defeating Airdrieonians in the final.

== First round ==
Home team	Score	Away team
Albion Rovers (4)	2 – 5	Montrose (4)
Dumbarton (3)	3 – 3	Stirling Albion (3)
Caledonian Thistle (4)	1 – 2	Queen of the South (3)
Stenhousemuir (3)	3 – 0	East Stirlingshire (4)

=== Replays ===
Home team	Score	Away team
Stirling Albion (3)	3 – 0	Dumbarton (3)

== Second round ==
Home team	Score	Away team
Queen's Park (4)	2 – 2	Greenock Morton (3)
Alloa Athletic (4)	2 – 3	Ross County (4)
Brechin City (3)	2 – 3	Stirling Albion (3)
Buckie Thistle (HL)	1 – 4	Berwick Rangers (3)
Burntisland Shipyard (AM)	6 – 2	St Cuthbert Wanderers (SSL)
Cove Rangers (HL)	2 – 1	Cowdenbeath (4)
Forfar Athletic (4)	0 – 1	Meadowbank Thistle (3)
Gala Fairydean (ESL)	2 – 6	East Fife (3)
Keith (HL)	2 – 2	Huntly (HL)
Queen of the South (3)	0 – 2	Clyde (3)
Stenhousemuir (3)	4 – 0	Arbroath (4)
Whitehill Welfare (ESL)	0 – 0	Montrose (4)

=== Replays ===
Home team	Score	Away team
Greenock Morton (3)	2 – 1	Queen's Park (4)
Huntly (HL)	3 – 1	Keith (HL)
Montrose (4)	5 – 2	Whitehill Welfare (ESL)

== Third round ==
Home team	Score	Away team
Falkirk (1)	0 – 2	Motherwell (1)
Hamilton Academical (2)	1 – 3	Rangers (1)
Meadowbank Thistle (3)	1 – 1	Berwick Rangers (3)
Clydebank (2)	1 – 1	Hearts (1)
East Fife (3)	1 – 0	Ross County (4)
Stirling Albion (3)	1 – 2	Airdrieonians (2)
St Johnstone (2)	1 – 1	Stenhousemuir (3)
Dundee (2)	2 – 1	Partick Thistle (1)
Aberdeen (1)	1 – 0	Stranraer (2)
Celtic (1)	2 – 0	St Mirren (2)
Cove Rangers (HL)	0 – 4	Dunfermline Athletic (2)
Dundee United (1)	0 – 0	Clyde (3)
Huntly (NL)	7 – 0	Burntisland Shipyard (NL)
Kilmarnock (1)	0 – 0	Greenock Morton (3)
Montrose (4)	0 – 2	Hibernian (1)
Raith Rovers (2)	1 – 0	Ayr United (2)

=== Replays ===
Home team	Score	Away team
Berwick Rangers (3)	3 – 3 (6 – 7 pen.)	Meadowbank Thistle (3)
Clyde (3)	1 – 5	Dundee United (1)
Hearts (1)	2 – 1	Clydebank (2)
Stenhousemuir (3)	4 – 0	St Johnstone (2)
Greenock Morton (3)	1 – 2	Kilmarnock (1)

== Fourth round ==
Home team	Score	Away team
Hearts (1)	4 – 2	Rangers (1)
Airdrieonians (2)	2 – 0	Dunfermline Athletic (2)
Celtic (1)	3 – 0	Meadowbank Thistle (3)
Dundee (2)	1 – 2	Raith Rovers (2)
Hibernian (1)	2 – 0	Motherwell (1)
Huntly (NL)	1 – 3	Dundee United (1)
Kilmarnock (1)	4 – 0	East Fife (3)
Stenhousemuir (3)	2 – 0	Aberdeen (1)

== Quarter-finals ==
Home team	Score	Away team
Hearts (1)	2 – 1	Dundee United (1)
Raith Rovers (2)	1 – 4	Airdrieonians (2)
Stenhousemuir (3)	0 – 4	Hibernian (1)
Celtic (1)	1 – 0	Kilmarnock (1)

== Semi-finals ==
7 April 1995

Hibernian	0–0	Celtic

Ibrox Stadium, Glasgow
Attendance: 40,950

8 April 1995

Airdrieonians	1–0	Hearts
Steve Cooper 30'

Hampden Park, Glasgow
Attendance: 22,538
Referee: Hugh Dallas

=== Replay ===
11 April 1995

Hibernian	1–3	Celtic

Ibrox Stadium, Glasgow
Attendance: 32,410

== Final ==
27 May 1995

Celtic	1–0	Airdrieonians
van Hooijdonk 9'

Hampden Park, Glasgow
Attendance: 36,915
Referee: Les Mottram

== See also ==
- 1994–95 in Scottish football
- 1994–95 Scottish League Cup
