= Gordon Dalziel =

Scottish footballer and manager

Personal information
- Full name: Gordon Dalziel
- Date of birth: 16 March 1962 (age 64)
- Place of birth: Motherwell, Scotland
- Position: Striker

Senior career*
Years	Team	Apps	(Gls)
1979–1983	Rangers	34	(9)
1983–1984	Manchester City	5	(0)
1984–1986	Partick Thistle	43	(6)
1986–1987	East Stirlingshire	10	(2)
1987–1995	Raith Rovers	308	(170)
1995–1997	Ayr United	24	(4)
Total		488	(191)

Managerial career
- 1995–2002: Ayr United
- 2002–2004: Glenafton Athletic
- 2004–2006: Raith Rovers
- 2007–2009: Glenafton Athletic
- 2017: Airdrieonians (caretaker)
- * Club domestic league appearances and goals

Gordon Dalziel (born 16 March 1962) is a Scottish football pundit, manager and former player. Dalziel spent most of his playing career with Raith Rovers, scoring 170 goals in 360 league appearances, and winning the 1994–95 Scottish League Cup. He also played for Rangers and Manchester City.

He is currently a pundit on Clyde 1's Superscoreboard and co-hosts The Big Scottish Football Podcast with Steven Mill.

== Career ==
During his playing career he played as a striker for Rangers, Manchester City, Partick Thistle, East Stirlingshire, Raith Rovers and Ayr United. His greatest success was achieved at Raith Rovers as he became the club's record league goalscorer, winning the Scottish League Cup in 1994–95 (scoring in the final) as well as two First Division titles. He won the First Division Players' Player award twice at Rovers. Dalziel scored 202 goals in 378 appearances in total for Raith Rovers.

His first managerial job was at Ayr United where he guided them to the 2001–02 League Cup final and the Scottish Cup semi-final in the same year. He was later sacked, however, having failed to get the club to the Scottish Premier League.

He later took over as manager at Junior team Glenafton, before leaving them to take over at Raith Rovers in 2004, with the club in financial difficulty. In September 2006, he was asked by the Raith Rovers board to take no active part in the running of the team, while they discussed the terms on which he may leave the club.

In May 2007, he returned to junior side Glenafton as manager, taking over from the departing former Partick Thistle boss Gerry Collins and in October 2016 was appointed as an advisor on footballing matters at Scottish League One club Airdrieonians. Dalziel was given the role of Director of Football at Airdrieonians on 31 October 2016, following the appointment of Mark Wilson as first team coach. Dalziel took charge of the team after Wilson left in June 2017, but the club had to appoint another coach, Willie Aitchison, due to his work for Radio Clyde. Dalziel left Airdrie in January 2018, after the club was taken over by new owners.

== Honours ==
=== Player ===
Rangers

- Scottish League Cup: 1981–82
- Scottish Cup runner-up: 1981–82, 1982–83

Raith Rovers

- Scottish League Cup: 1994–95
- Scottish First Division: 1992–93, 1994–95

Individual

- Scottish First Division Top scorer: 1987–88, 1990–91, 1991–92, 1992–93
- SPFA First Division Player of the Year: 1991–92, 1992–93
- Raith Rovers Supporters' Player of the Year: 1991–92
- Raith Rovers Players' Player of the Year: 1991–92
- Daily Record Silver Shot: 1992–93

=== Manager ===
Ayr United

- Scottish Second Division: 1996–97
- Scottish League Cup runner-up: 2001–02
- Scottish First Division runner-up: 2000–01

Glenafton Athletic

- West of Scotland Cup Winners: 2002–03

Individual

- SFL First Division Manager of the Month: November 1997, March 2001, February 2002
- SFL Second Division Manager of the Month: August 1996
