= Jimmy Nicholl =

Northern Irish footballer (born 1956)

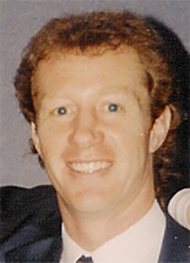
- Nicholl in 1994

Personal information
- Full name: James Michael Nicholl
- Date of birth: 28 December 1956 (age 69)
- Place of birth: Hamilton, Ontario, Canada
- Height: 5 ft 10 in (1.78 m)
- Position: Defender

Team information
- Current team: Northern Ireland (assistant manager)

Youth career
- 1971–1974: Manchester United

Senior career*
Years	Team	Apps	(Gls)
1974–1982	Manchester United	197	(3)
1982	→ Sunderland (loan)	3	(0)
1982	Toronto Blizzard	16	(3)
1982–1983	Sunderland	29	(0)
1983–1984	Toronto Blizzard	49	(8)
1983–1984	Rangers	17	(0)
1984–1986	West Bromwich Albion	56	(0)
1986–1989	Rangers	58	(0)
1989–1990	Dunfermline Athletic	24	(0)
1990–1996	Raith Rovers	128	(6)
1996	Bath City	1	(0)
Total		577	(20)

International career
1976–1986	Northern Ireland	73	(1)

Managerial career
- 1990–1996: Raith Rovers (player-manager)
- 1996–1997: Millwall
- 1997–1999: Raith Rovers
- 2010–2011: Cowdenbeath
- 2013: Hibernian (caretaker)
- 2013–2015: Cowdenbeath
- 2018: Rangers (caretaker)
- * Club domestic league appearances and goals

James Michael Nicholl (born 28 December 1956) is a Northern Irish former professional footballer who played for several clubs, including Manchester United and Rangers. He was mainly a right-back but could also play in other defensive roles. Nicholl won a total of 73 international caps for Northern Ireland, scoring one goal.

After retiring as a player, he moved into coaching and management. He enjoyed success as manager of Raith Rovers, winning the 1994–95 Scottish League Cup. In recent years he has worked as an assistant coach for several Scottish clubs, including Aberdeen, Kilmarnock, Hibernian, Falkirk, Rangers and Dundee.

== Early life ==
Jimmy Nicholl was born in Hamilton, Ontario, Canada, to Northern Irish parents. His family moved back to Northern Ireland when he was 3. Nicholl grew up on the Rathcoole estate on the outskirts of Belfast. After he began his football career as an apprentice with Manchester United, the club arranged for Nicholl's family to relocate to England after they faced threats from loyalist paramilitaries. Manchester United at that time were perceived as a club with Irish Catholic sympathies, and the Nicholl family were ordered to leave Rathcoole if Jimmy signed for the club.

== Playing career ==
Nicholl started his career as a junior player at Manchester United. His senior career started in 1974. He helped the club win the 1977 FA Cup Final and collected a runners-up medal in 1979.

In 1981, he left the club after scoring five goals, joining Sunderland on a permanent contract after a loan spell, and playing 32 games in one season before moving to Toronto Blizzard in Canada, scoring 11 goals in 77 games over the next two years before signing for Rangers.

In 1984, he returned to the English league to sign for West Bromwich Albion where he stayed until their relegation from the First Division in 1986, then returning to Rangers for three years, helping them win two Scottish league titles in the process.

After leaving Rangers, he signed for Dunfermline Athletic in 1989 before moving to a player-manager role at Raith Rovers, having originally joined them on 27 November 1990. Following his time at Rovers, Nicholl played one game for Bath City in February 1996, a 3–0 defeat at home to Macclesfield Town. He was sent off after 55 minutes and never played for the club again.

== Coaching career ==
Nicholl had great success as manager of Raith Rovers, winning the 1994–95 Scottish League Cup and the 1994–95 Scottish First Division championship. Due to their League Cup triumph, Raith qualified for the 1995–96 UEFA Cup and reached the second round, where they were eliminated by eventual winners Bayern Munich. Having lost the first leg to Bayern 2–0 at Easter Road, Raith took a 1–0 lead at the Olympiastadion thanks to a goal by Danny Lennon. Bayern recovered to win 2–1 on the night and 4–1 on aggregate.

On 28 February 1996, Nicholl was appointed manager of Millwall, who just over two months earlier had been top of Division One but were now sliding down the table. He was unable to arrest the decline and Millwall slipped into Division Two on the last day of the season. He remained at Millwall until the following February, and six months after that returned to Raith Rovers. His second spell at Raith lasted two years, and ended on 14 June 1999 after he had failed to get them back into the top flight.

A 28-day spell as manager of Dunfermline Athletic followed later in 1999, and he later served as assistant manager to Jimmy Calderwood at East End Park. In May 2004, Nicholl followed Calderwood when he took over as manager at Aberdeen, again serving as his assistant until the two parted company with the club in May 2009. He resumed his partnership with Calderwood at Kilmarnock in 2010.

Nicholl was appointed manager of Cowdenbeath in June 2010, but he left Cowdenbeath at the end of the 2010–11 season after they were relegated from the First Division.

Nicholl was then appointed assistant manager of Kilmarnock for a second time, by Kenny Shiels on 15 June 2011. Kilmarnock won the 2011–12 Scottish League Cup under Shiels and Nicholl, but Shiels was sacked by Kilmarnock in June 2013. Nicholl then decided to accept the offer of assistant manager at Hibernian. After manager Pat Fenlon resigned on 1 November, Nicholl was appointed caretaker manager. Nicholl left Hibernian soon after their new management team was recruited.

After leaving Hibernian, Nicholl returned to Cowdenbeath for a second stint as their manager. He led the Blue Brazil to avoid relegation via the Scottish Championship play-offs in the 2013–14 season beating local rivals Dunfermline Athletic in the two-legged final. He led the side to the Fife Cup that season. However a very difficult season followed in 2014–15, which included a joint-record 10–0 defeat to eventual champions Heart of Midlothian. The following week, Cowdenbeath managed to draw 0–0 with Rangers. The club was relegated to League One on the last day, after which Nicholl resigned as manager.

While still at Cowdenbeath, Nicholl had also become assistant manager to Michael O'Neill with the Northern Ireland national team in March 2015. He was appointed as assistant to new Falkirk manager Paul Hartley in October 2017, while also continuing in his role with Northern Ireland. He became assistant manager at Rangers in January 2018, assisting Graeme Murty. After Murty left Rangers on 1 May, Nicholl and Jonatan Johansson were placed in interim charge until the appointment of Steven Gerrard on 1 June.

Nicholl joined St Mirren as their first team coach in November 2018. He then moved to Dundee in May 2019, assisting James McPake. Nicholl was released from the club in June 2020.

On 28 June 2020, Nicholl became assistant manager of Northern Ireland national football team.

== Honours ==
=== Player ===
Manchester United

- FA Cup: 1976–77; runner-up: 1978–79

Rangers

- Scottish Premier Division: 1986–87, 1988–89
- Scottish League Cup: 1983–84, 1986–87, 1987–88

Raith Rovers

- Scottish First Division: 1992–93
- Fife Cup: 1990–91, 1992–93

=== Manager ===
Raith Rovers

- Scottish First Division: 1992–93, 1994–95
- Scottish League Cup: 1994–95
- Fife Cup: 1990–91, 1992–93, 1993–94, 1994–95, 1997–98, 1998–99

Cowdenbeath

- Scottish Championship play-offs: 2013–14
- Fife Cup: 2013–14

== Managerial statistics ==
As of 13 May 2018

Team	Nat	From	To	Record				
Team	Nat	From	To	G	W	D	L	Win %
Raith Rovers	(Scotland)	November 1990	February 1996	249	99	72	78	39.76
Millwall	(England)	February 1996	February 1997	46	15	11	20	32.61
Raith Rovers	(Scotland)	August 1997	June 1999	81	29	20	32	35.80
Cowdenbeath	(Scotland)	June 2010	June 2011	42	10	9	23	23.81
Cowdenbeath	(Scotland)	November 2013	May 2015	67	20	10	37	29.85
Rangers (caretaker)	(Scotland)	May 2018	June 2018	3	1	2	0	33.33
Total				488	174	124	190	35.66
