= Raith Rovers F.C. =

Scottish football club in Kirkcaldy

Raith Rovers
- Full name: Raith Rovers Football Club
- Short name: The Rovers
- Founded: 1883; 143 years ago
- Ground: Stark's Park, Kirkcaldy
- Capacity: 8,867
- Chairman: John Sim (interim)
- Manager: Dougie Imrie
- League: Scottish Championship
- 2025–26: Scottish Championship, 5th of 10
- Website: www.raithrovers.net
| Home colours | Away colours | Third colours |

Raith Rovers Football Club is a Scottish professional football club based in the town of Kirkcaldy, Fife. The club was founded in 1883 and currently competes in the Scottish Championship as a member of the Scottish Professional Football League.

The club has won five national trophies: the 1994 Scottish League Cup, and the 2013–14, 2019–20, 2021–22 and 2025–26 editions of the Scottish Challenge Cup, and were runners-up in the 1949 Scottish League Cup and 1913 Scottish Cup. They have won the second tier of Scottish football six times, been runners-up four times, and reached its highest ever league finish in 1922, third in Division One.

As a result of winning the League Cup in 1994, Raith Rovers qualified for European football for the first time, entering the UEFA Cup the following season. The club managed to reach the second round, only to be defeated 4–1 on aggregate by eventual champions Bayern Munich.

Raith's home ground is Stark's Park, an 8,867 all-seater stadium in the south of Kirkcaldy. The club has been based at the ground since 1891.

== History ==
=== Beginnings and name ===
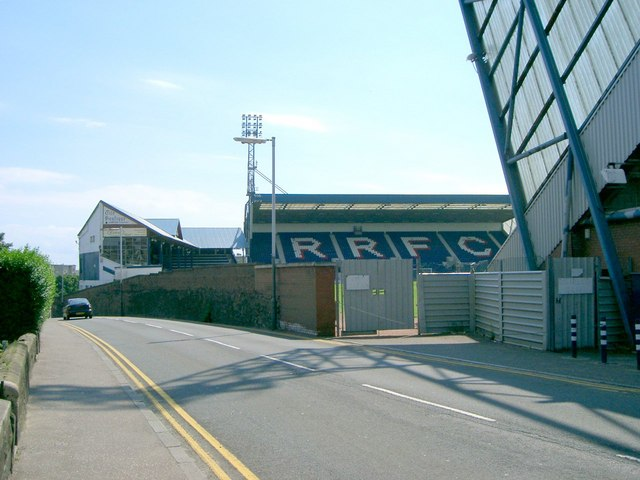
Stark's Park, home of Raith Rovers

The modern Raith Rovers were founded in 1883 in the Scottish town of Kirkcaldy, playing first at Sands Brae, now part of the Esplanade, then Robbie's Park. Though there were other teams who incorporated the town name, such as Kirkcaldy Wanderers and Kirkcaldy United, Raith became the most successful of the local teams, winning five trophies in the 1890s. There had been a much earlier (and unrelated) Raith Rovers which merged with what is now Cowdenbeath in 1882.

Although it lends its name to many entities in the region, Raith is not itself a settlement. A Raith Rovers victory in the 1960s led to a BBC commentator's blunder that the fans would be "dancing in the streets of Raith tonight". Although commonly attributed to David Coleman, it was actually said by Sam Leitch. Raith (Scottish Gaelic: rath, "fort" or "fortified residence") as an area once stretched from south of Loch Gelly as far as Kirkcaldy and the Battle of Raith was once theorised to have been fought here in 596 AD. Raith House and Raith Tower sit on Cormie Hill to the west of Kirkcaldy and several parts of the town are built on land formerly of the Raith Estate, although the modern housing estate bearing the Raith name dates from long after the origins of the team.

A mixture of local success and ambition took the club into the senior leagues where they established themselves and thereby became the pre-eminent team in the town. The club became a senior team in 1889 around the same time they were forced to leave Robbie's Park which was incorporated into a new public park called the Beveridge Park, named after Provost Michael Beveridge. The team subsequently moved to their current home of Stark's Park named after and run by councillor Robert Stark in 1891. The club turned professional by 1892 and were the first football team in Fife to be elected to the Scottish League in season 1902–03. The club were incorporated into a limited company: the Raith Rovers Football and Athletic Company, Ltd in 1907. After two consecutive successful seasons in 2nd Division, the club elected to join the 1st Division in 1909–10. Three years later, the club made their first (and only) appearance in the Scottish Cup Final, losing 2–0 to Falkirk.

=== Setting records ===
In 1921 an innovation in training, previously unknown to the Scottish game, was introduced by directors following a visit to England: the use of a ball in training. As noted in the Fife Free Press, "Hitherto, ball practice has been an absentee from the training curriculum on the grounds that being away from the ball for a week imparted eagerness on the Saturday." This heralded an era of success.

The club had its highest ever league finish in the Scottish top division, when they came third to the Old Firm in 1921–22 under manager James Logan (a former Raith player who had fought in World War I having enlisted in McCrae's Battalion, along with several teammates who died in the conflict). This was followed by the unusual incident where the players were shipwrecked in 1923. Along with a cargo of chilled meat bound for Buenos Aires, the team had been en route to play friendly matches on the Canary Islands when the SS Highland Loch ran aground off the coast of Galicia, near Vilagarcía. The players were able to safely disembark, being rescued by local fishermen. They continued on their way a few days later, winning all four of their games on the islands, including one against Third Lanark, returning from a tour of South America. In July 2023, the club marked the 100th anniversary of the shipwreck with its new away strip in the yellow and blue colours of UD Las Palmas, a team based in Gran Canaria, and including a map of the archipelago and the date of the shipwreck.

The team battled on during tough times between the 1920s and 1930s but things improved by the season of 1937–38, which saw Raith setting a British League Record with 142 goals in just 34 league matches while winning the 2nd Division championship. The record still stands today. The forward line of Glen (5 goals), Gilmour (35), Norrie Haywood (47), Whitelaw (26) and Joyner (21) scored 134 of the record 142 goals.

Around this time, a then record crowd of 25,500 filled Stark's Park on a Wednesday afternoon for a Scottish Cup quarter-final replay against East Fife (The first game had attracted 19,000 to the old Bayview ground). East Fife won 3–2 and went on to become the only 2nd Division club to win the Scottish Cup until Hibs matched the feat in 2016.

Record appearance holder Willie McNaught first appeared for Raith during the war before signing on a contract basis when normal football resumed after the end of global hostilities. McNaught went on to make 657 senior football appearances (many as captain) for Rovers. Raith reached the League Cup final for the first time in 1948–49 but lost 2–0 to Rangers. In an echo of what would happen four decades later, the club also went on to win the 2nd Division title. In the period of the club's greatest high level consistency, Rovers stayed in the top division until the season after McNaught's 1962 departure. In 1951, Raith had their largest ever gate for a Scottish Cup semi-final at Hampden Park watched by a crowd of 84,640. Raith lost 3–2 to Celtic.

=== Promotions, relegations and Footballer of the Year ===
A disastrous season came in 1962–63, when the club finished bottom of the First Division conceding 118 goals in 34 games. After leaving Queen of the South, George Farm became Raith manager in 1964. Farm took Raith to promotion in 1966–67 before leaving for Fife rivals Dunfermline Athletic and was never able to repeat the formula when he returned in the season of 1971–72. Raith managed to avoid relegation in 1967–68, thanks to striker Gordon Wallace, who became the first player outwith the Old Firm to be voted SFWA Footballer of the Year. He scored 27 goals in 34 matches. However the club did find themselves being relegated again at the end of the 1969–70 season. Nonetheless, the Rovers during this time managed to get through to the quarter-finals of the Scottish cup for the second year running between 1970–71 and 1971–72 – although the latter saw them beaten 3–1 by Kilmarnock with a crowd of 10,815.

In 1975–76, the league set-up changed from Divisions 1 & 2 to a 3 tier system (Premier Division, Division 1 & Division 2). In the inaugural year of this system, Raith were promoted to the 1st Division, but were promptly relegated the next season, before bouncing back up the season after. Raith then performed reasonably well in the 1st Division, hovering around the top four until the early 1980s.

A new manager, Frank Connor took charge in early 1986, bringing many new faces onto the team which resulted in promotion on goal difference after a 4–1 win against Stranraer (while Ayr United lost to Stirling Albion) on the last day of the season.

=== The League Cup winning era ===
Raith reverted to being a full-time side again for the season of 1991–92 which was soon followed by winning the First Division title in the season of 1992–93. This was to start the most successful period in the club's history – which saw the team's first foray into the Scottish Premier Division (now the Premiership).

On 27 November 1994, Raith, managed by Jimmy Nicholl, surprisingly beat Celtic 6–5 on penalties to win the Coca-Cola Cup, after a 2–2 draw. Future Raith manager, Gordon Dalziel, scored the equalising goal for Raith in the dying minutes of regulation time. The same season, Raith were again promoted to the Premier Division after winning the First Division title.

As a result of the Cup win, Raith qualified for Europe (UEFA Cup) for the first time in their history. After eliminating both the Faroese and Icelandic champions (Gøtu Ítróttarfelag and Íþróttabandalag Akraness respectively) in the first two rounds, the club finally succumbed to eventual UEFA Cup winners Bayern Munich. They were beaten 2–0 by the German side in the 1st leg, which was not played at their home ground but at Easter Road, home of Hibernian. In the 2nd leg, at the Olympiastadion they led 1–0 at half time against all odds, eventually losing 2–1. This was the first time a Scottish team had qualified for a major European competition while playing outside the top league. The same season, Raith finished sixth in the Premier League.

Winning the Coca-Cola Cup, selling Steve McAnespie and playing in the UEFA Cup generated the money needed to redevelop Stark's Park as an all-seater ground with North and South Stands. It was completed in time for the 1995–96 season, and Bayern Munich were invited to play a friendly in the first match in the redeveloped ground, with Raith securing a narrow 1–0 win.

=== End of the fairytale ===
After the club were relegated from the Premier Division, they also struggled to succeed in the First Division. For the 2001–02 season they were relegated to the Second Division for the first time since 1987. The club returned to the First Division (with the lowest winning total, to date, for champions of 59 points), under the leadership of Antonio Calderón in 2002–03 season.

At the start of the 2004–05 season, Claude Anelka (brother of French striker Nicolas) offered £300,000 to any team who would offer him a manager's job and was subsequently appointed the manager of Raith Rovers, with Antonio Calderón refusing the offer of a coaching role and leaving the club. Anelka signed a team of (mostly) continental players from the lower leagues in France. A disastrous season followed, despite Anelka resigning halfway through the season (replaced by Gordon Dalziel) and his signings either leaving, or having their contracts terminated, and Raith were relegated to the Second Division, after finishing bottom of the First Division with just 16 points in the season.

=== Local takeover ===
During 2005–06, the future of the club looked doubtful after the club, and its traditional home of Stark's Park, were both placed under threat by previous owners Colin McGowan and Alex Short. The Glasgow based property developers had repeatedly threatened to sell Stark's Park for housing in a bid to find a buyer for their 50% stake in the club and after months of legal and financial wrangling a deal was struck with their company, West City Development.

Former chairman Turnbull Hutton and director Mario Caira, who were part of West City retained their investment and were joined by major investor John Sim, a Thailand-based senior financial figure with liquidator KPMG.

The Reclaim the Rovers fans' campaign, which was launched in a bid to secure a local future for the club, also secured a place for a Supporters' Representative on the new-look board after raising £100,000 towards the final figure.

On 30 December 2005, Raith Rovers' future was secured after a £1.2 million community buy-out (The New Raith Rovers Limited consortium) (assisted by the then Chancellor of the Exchequer Gordon Brown who later became Prime Minister, a fan and shareholder of the club). Previous chairman David Sinton also completed work on the takeover.

On 2 May 2009, Raith secured the Second Division title with a 1–0 win at the home of Scottish football, Hampden Park, with a travelling support of over 1500. They lifted the trophy in front of almost 5000 the following week following a 0–0 draw with Arbroath.

On 6 April 2014, Raith won the 2014 Scottish Challenge Cup final 1–0 against Rangers after extra time.

In early 2022 the club signed David Goodwillie. Days later, after an outcry regarding the rape ruling against him, chairman John Sim announced Goodwillie will not play for Raith Rovers and the club would review his contract. Raith's women's teams had moved to sever ties with the club. Goodwillie was released from his contract in September, no details being given by the club.

== Colours and badge ==
Raith's kit consists of dark blue tops with light blue detailing, with white shorts and dark blue socks. Raith's current badge has been used since 1998, replacing the previous lion and shield motif used in different colour combinations (including being framed in a shield shape from 1995 to 1998) since 1985.

== Fife rivalries ==
There are three other SPFL clubs in Fife: East Fife (based in Methil) around 8 miles to the east, with Kelty Hearts and Dunfermline Athletic 13 and 14 miles respectively to the west. Raith's traditional derby is with East Fife though the biggest rivalry is against Dunfermline, with an encounter at East End Park in April 2011 attracting a crowd of over 11,000. Cowdenbeath dropped from the SPFL into the Lowland League in 2022 but historically were another regular derby rival in various divisions.

== Supporters and culture ==
In addition to former Prime Minister Gordon Brown, fans include author Ian Rankin, Coldplay bassist Guy Berryman and writer Harry Ritchie. Author Val McDermid is a former director but in February 2022 cancelled her sponsorship and ended her lifelong support of the club in protest at the signing of David Goodwillie to the playing squad. Former Scotland and Hearts manager Craig Levein has supported the team since boyhood and was briefly manager in 2006.

=== Literature ===
The team is often mentioned in Ian Rankin's Inspector Rebus novels, Rankin stating that Rebus is a supporter. In Giles Foden's novel The Last King of Scotland the protagonist, Nicholas Garrigan, is a Raith Rovers fan.

=== Music ===
The Raith Rovers anthem is "Geordie Munro", with its prominent mention of Kirkcaldy.

=== Fan friendships and contacts ===
Supporter contact is maintained with fans of the German football club FC Ingolstadt 04, from the twin city of Ingolstadt.

== Players ==
=== Current squad ===
As of 28 August 2026

Note: Flags indicate national team as defined under FIFA eligibility rules; some limited exceptions apply. Players may hold more than one non-FIFA nationality.

| No. | Pos. | Nation | Player |
|---|---|---|---|
| 1 | GK | SCO | Josh Rae |
| 2 | DF | ENG | Jai Rowe |
| 3 | DF | IRL | Zak Delaney |
| 4 | DF | SCO | Paul Hanlon |
| 5 | DF | SCO | Callum Fordyce |
| 6 | DF | SCO | Jack Baird |
| 7 | MF | SCO | Arron Lyall |
| 8 | MF | SCO | Kyle Turner |
| 9 | FW | ENG | George Oakley |
| 10 | FW | SCO | Lewis Vaughan |
| 11 | FW | SCO | John Robertson |

| No. | Pos. | Nation | Player |
|---|---|---|---|
| 13 | GK | WAL | Luke Armstrong (on loan from Cardiff City) |
| 14 | MF | SCO | Calum Adamson (on loan from Rangers) |
| 15 | FW | SCO | Scott Tiffoney (on loan from Kilmarnock) |
| 16 | DF | SCO | Lewis Stevenson |
| 18 | FW | SCO | Paul McMullan |
| 19 | FW | SCO | Anton Dowds |
| 20 | MF | SCO | Scott Brown (captain) |
| 21 | MF | SCO | Charlie Telfer |
| 22 | DF | SCO | Ross Millen |
| 23 | MF | SCO | Dylan Easton |
| 25 | MF | SCO | Kai Montagu |

== Club officials ==
=== Board of directors ===
| Name | Role |
|---|---|
| John Sim | Interim chairman |
| Allan Halliday | Director of football operations |
| Ruaridh Kilgour | Digital director |
| Ali Adamson | Director |
| Steven MacDonald | Director |
| Hayley Scott | General manager |

=== Management ===
| Name | Role |
|---|---|
| Dougie Imrie | Manager |
| Andy Millen | Assistant manager |
| Jon Connolly | Goalkeeping coach |
| Jack Devereaux | Head physiotherapist |
| Mac Kenney | Head of sports science |
| Simon Pollock | Kitman and stadium manager |

== Managerial history ==
Managers of the club have included:

- 1945–1961: Bert Herdman – Oversaw some of the club's most successful seasons and a sustained period in the top flight.
- 1964–1967, 1971–1974: George Farm – In a career of distinction in both playing and managing, Farm included a promotion success with Raith among the numerous achievements he enjoyed throughout his career.
- 1986–1990: Frank Connor – Took the club from depths of the Second Division to a solid First Division spot.
- 1990–1996: Jimmy Nicholl – Manager (and player until 1994) who won two First Division titles, the historic League Cup victory and oversaw Rovers' only foray into European competition.

Raith Rovers have appointed 34 permanent managers since World War II:

| Name | Period |
|---|---|
| (Scotland) Bert Herdman | 1945–1961 |
| (Scotland) Hugh Shaw | 1961–1962 |
| (Scotland) Alfie Conn | 1962–1963 |
| (Scotland) Doug Cowie | 1963–1964 |
| (Scotland) George Farm | 1964–1967 |
| (Scotland) George Farm | 1971–1974 |
| (Scotland) Tommy Walker | 1967–1969 |
| (Scotland) Jimmy Millar | 1969–1970 |
| (Scotland) Bill Baxter | 1970–1971 |
| (Scotland) Bert Paton | 1974–1975 |
| (Scotland) Andy Matthew | 1975–1978 |
| (Scotland) Willie McLean | 1978–1979 |
| (Scotland) Gordon Wallace | 1979–1983 |
| (Scotland) Bobby Wilson | 1983–1986 |
| (Scotland) Frank Connor | 1986–1990 |
| (Northern Ireland) Jimmy Nicholl | 1990–1996 |
| (Northern Ireland) Jimmy Nicholl | 1997–1999 |
| (Scotland) Jimmy Thomson | 1996 |
| (Scotland) Tommy McLean | 1996 |
| (Scotland) Iain Munro | 1996–1997 |

| Name | Period |
|---|---|
| (Scotland) John McVeigh | 1999 |
| (Scotland) Peter Hetherston | 1999–2001 |
| (Scotland) Jocky Scott | 2001–2002 |
| (Spain) Antonio Calderón | 2002–2004 |
| (France) Claude Anelka | 2004 |
| (Scotland) Gordon Dalziel | 2004–2006 |
| (Scotland) Craig Levein | 2006 |
| (Scotland) John McGlynn | 2006–2012 |
| (Scotland) John McGlynn | 2018–2022 |
| (Scotland) Grant Murray | 2012–2015 |
| (Scotland) Ray McKinnon | 2015–2016 |
| (Scotland) Gary Locke | 2016–2017 |
| (Scotland) John Hughes | 2017 |
| (Scotland) Barry Smith | 2017–2018 |
| (Scotland) Ian Murray | 2022–2024 |
| (Scotland) Neill Collins | 2024 |
| (Scotland) Barry Robson | 2024–2025 |
| (Scotland) Dougie Imrie | 2025– |

== Women's team ==
Raith Rovers Ladies and Girls F.C. was the oldest affiliated women's team in Scotland. In February 2022, the team resolved to cut ties with Raith Rovers due to the controversy over the signing of David Goodwillie, who was ruled to have raped a woman. The women's team renamed themselves McDermid Ladies, after the writer Val McDermid.

== Honours ==
- Scottish Football League Division Two / Scottish First Division
  - Winners: 1907–08, 1909–10, 1937–38, 1948–49, 1992–93, 1994–95
  - Runners-up: 1908–09, 1926–27, 1966–67, 2010–11
- Scottish Second Division / Scottish League One:
  - Winners: 2002–03, 2008–09, 2019–20
  - Runners-up: 1975–76, 1977–78, 1986–87, 2017–18
- Scottish Cup:
  - Runners-up: 1912–13
- Scottish League Cup:
  - Winners: 1994–95
  - Runners-up: 1948–49
- Scottish Challenge Cup:
  - Winners: 2013–14, 2019–20, (Note: Shared with Inverness Caledonian Thistle.) 2021–22, 2025–26
  - Runners-up: 2022–23
- B Division Supplementary Cup:
  - Runners-up: 1946–47, 1948–49
- Scottish Qualifying Cup:
  - Winners: 1906–07
  - Runners-up: 1907–08

=== Minor honours ===
- Fife Cup:
  - Winners (35): 1891–92, 1893–94, 1897–98, 1898–99, 1905–06, 1908–09, 1914–15, 1920–21, 1921–22, 1922–23, 1924–25, 1929–30, 1947–48, 1950–51, 1955–56, 1956–57, 1961–62, 1966–67, 1967–68, 1968–69, 1971–72, 1975–76, 1980–81, 1986–87, 1989–90, 1990–91, 1992–93, 1993–94, 1994–95, 1997–98, 1998–99, 1999–2000, 2001–02, 2003–04, 2011–12
  - Shared (4): 1952–53, 1954–55, 1959–60, 1965–66
  - Runners-up (23): 1892–93, 1900–01, 1904–05, 1910–11, 1915–16, 1917–18, 1923–24, 1928–29, 1930–31, 1932–33, 1938–39, 1953–54, 1957–58, 1960–61, 1964–65, 1978–79, 1982–83, 1987–88, 1996–97, 2000–01, 2002–03, 2004–05, 2007–08
- King Cup:
  - Winners (3): 1890–91, 1898–99, 1900–01
- Wemyss Cup:
  - Winners (8): 1897–98, 1900–01, 1903–04, 1904–05, 1905–06, 1914–15, 1920–21, 1938–39
  - Shared (1): 1937–38
- Stark Cup:
  - Winners (2): 1908–09, 1911–12
  - Shared (2): 1909–10, 1910–11
- Penman Cup:
  - Winners (8): 1905–06, 1908–09, 1911–12, 1922–23, 1923–24, 1936–37, 1947–48, 1958–59
  - Runners-up (2): 1926–27, 1957–58
- Fifeshire Charity Cup:
  - Winners (1): 1890–91
  - Runners-up (1): 1898–99
- Kirkcaldy Cottage Hospital Charity Cup:
  - Winners: (4) 1896–97, 1897–98, 1898–99, 1902–03
- Kirkcaldy Hospital Cup:
  - Shared (1): 1919–20
- West Fife Charity Cup:
  - Runners-up (1): 1923–24
- East Fife Charity Cup:
  - Winners (1): 1922–23
- Fife Charity Cup:
  - Runners-up (1): 1925–26

== Notable former players ==
=== The League Cup winning team ===
Players from the team that lifted the 1994–95 Scottish League Cup include:

- Shaun Dennis – Over 400 appearances in three different spells between 1988 and 2004 before taking on a coaching role for a short period. Also played for Hibernian and Brechin City.
- Colin Cameron – 'Mickey', a former Scottish internationalist who started his career with Raith Rovers. He was signed by Hearts where he won the Scottish Cup in 1998 before moving onto Wolves, Coventry City and Milton Keynes Dons.
- Jason Dair – Experienced midfielder Dair, who can also play in defence, has also played for Millwall and Dunfermline, among many other teams. Like his one-time teammate, Shaun Dennis, Jason had three different spells at Raith.
- Stevie Crawford – A former Scottish international who started his career with Raith Rovers. He played for Cowdenbeath after being released from his second spell with Dunfermline. Crawford has also played for Millwall, Hibernian, Plymouth Argyle, Dundee United, Aberdeen and East Fife (Was also manager of the latter club).
- Gordon Dalziel – Record league goalscorer for Raith Rovers with 154 goals in the 1980s and 1990s, who returned as a manager in 2004. Scored the equalising goal in the Cup Final.
- David Narey MBE – veteran player, formerly of Dundee United (1973–1994), who scored a goal against Brazil in the 1982 World Cup. David retired after the Coca-Cola Cup win, in which he was named Man of the Match.
- Steve McAnespie – Sold to Bolton Wanderers for Raith's record transfer fee of £900,000 at the end of the 1994–95 season. Now coaching in the US. The money from his transfer helped redevelop Stark's Park.

Also involved in the squad were Scott Thomson, Julian Broddle, David Sinclair, Ally Graham, Brian Potter, Jason Rowbotham and Ian Redford.

=== Scottish Football Hall of Fame ===
As of 1 June 2020, 10 players to have been involved with Raith Rovers in their careers have entered the Scottish Football Hall of Fame:

- (Scotland) Jim Baxter
- (Scotland) Alex James
- (Scotland) McCrae's Battalion
- (Scotland) Willie Wallace
- (Scotland) David Narey

=== Scottish Sports Hall of Fame ===
One former Raith Rovers player has been selected in the Scottish Sports Hall of Fame:

- (Scotland) Jim Baxter

== Club records ==
- Record attendance: 31,306 vs Hearts, 7 February 1953
- Record victory: 10–1 vs Coldstream, Scottish Cup, 1954
- Record defeat: 2–11 vs Morton, Division 2, 1936
- League goalscoring record: Norrie Heywood, 1937–38, 42 goals
- Most league goals (individual): Gordon Dalziel, 154 (1987–1994)
- Most goals in a league season (team): 142, 1937–38 (British Record)
- Most capped player: David Morris, 6 caps for Scotland
- Highest transfer fee paid: £225,000 for Paul Harvey (from Airdrie, July 1996)
- Highest transfer fee received: £900,000 for Steve McAnespie (to Bolton Wanderers, September 1995)

== European record ==
| Season | Competition | Round | Opponent | Home | Away | Aggregate |
|---|---|---|---|---|---|---|
| 1995–96 | UEFA Cup | Preliminary round | (Faroe Islands) GÍ | 4–0 | 2–2 | 6–2 |
| 1995–96 | UEFA Cup | First round | (Iceland) ÍA | 3–1 | 0–1 | 3–2 |
| 1995–96 | UEFA Cup | Second round | (Germany) Bayern Munich | 0–2 | 1–2 | 1–4 |
