= 1992–93 Scottish First Division =

Scottish First Division
- Season: 1992–93
- Champions: Raith Rovers
- Promoted: Raith Rovers; Kilmarnock
- Relegated: Meadowbank Thistle; Cowdenbeath
- Matches played: 264
- Goals scored: 712 (2.7 per match)
- Top goalscorer: Gordon Dalziel (33)
- Biggest home win: Raith Rovers 7–0 St Mirren, 01.08.1992
- Biggest away win: Stirling Albion 0–5 Dunfermline Athletic, 05.09.1992

The 1992–93 Scottish First Division season was won by Raith Rovers, who were promoted along with Kilmarnock to the Premier Division. Meadowbank Thistle and Cowdenbeath were relegated.

== League table ==
Pos	Team	Pld	W	D	L	GF	GA	GD	Pts	Promotion or relegation
1	Raith Rovers (C, P)	44	25	15	4	85	41	+44	65	Promotion to the Premier Division
2	Kilmarnock (P)	44	21	12	11	67	40	+27	54	Promotion to the Premier Division
3	Dunfermline Athletic	44	22	8	14	64	47	+17	52	
4	St Mirren	44	21	9	14	62	52	+10	51	
5	Hamilton Academical	44	19	12	13	65	45	+20	50	
6	Morton	44	19	10	15	65	56	+9	48	
7	Ayr United	44	14	18	12	49	44	+5	46	
8	Clydebank	44	16	13	15	71	66	+5	45	
9	Dumbarton	44	15	7	22	56	71	−15	37	
10	Stirling Albion	44	11	13	20	44	61	−17	35	
11	Meadowbank Thistle (R)	44	11	10	23	51	80	−29	32	Relegation to the Second Division
12	Cowdenbeath (R)	44	3	7	34	32	109	−77	13	Relegation to the Second Division

Source: RSSSF and statto
Rules for classification: 1) points; 2) goal difference; 3) number of goals scored.
(C) Champions; (P) Promoted; (R) Relegated
