= 1994–95 Scottish First Division =

Scottish First Division
- Season: 1994–95
- Champions: Raith Rovers
- Promoted: Raith Rovers
- Relegated: Ayr United; Stranraer
- UEFA Cup: Raith Rovers
- Matches played: 180
- Goals scored: 456 (2.53 per match)
- Top goalscorer: Peter Duffield (21)
- Biggest home win: Airdrieonians 8–1 Stranraer, 03.12.1994
- Biggest away win: Stranraer 0–5 Hamilton Academical, 25.03.1995; Stranraer 0–5 Dundee, 13.05.1995

The 1994–95 Scottish First Division season was won by Raith Rovers, who were promoted one point ahead of Dunfermline Athletic and Dundee. Ayr United and Stranraer were relegated.

== League table ==
| Pos | Team | Pld | W | D | L | GF | GA | GD | Pts | Promotion or relegation |
|---|---|---|---|---|---|---|---|---|---|---|
| 1 | Raith Rovers (C, P) | 36 | 19 | 12 | 5 | 54 | 32 | +22 | 69 | Promotion to the Premier Division and qualification for UEFA Cup Preliminary round (Note: Raith Rovers qualified for the UEFA Cup as League Cup winners) |
| 2 | Dunfermline Athletic | 36 | 18 | 14 | 4 | 73 | 37 | +36 | 68 | Qualification for the Play-off |
| 3 | Dundee | 36 | 20 | 8 | 8 | 65 | 36 | +29 | 68 | |
| 4 | Airdrieonians | 36 | 17 | 10 | 9 | 50 | 33 | +17 | 61 | |
| 5 | St Johnstone | 36 | 14 | 14 | 8 | 59 | 39 | +20 | 56 | |
| 6 | Hamilton Academical | 36 | 14 | 7 | 15 | 42 | 48 | −6 | 49 | |
| 7 | St Mirren | 36 | 8 | 12 | 16 | 34 | 50 | −16 | 36 | |
| 8 | Clydebank | 36 | 8 | 11 | 17 | 33 | 47 | −14 | 35 | |
| 9 | Ayr United (R) | 36 | 6 | 11 | 19 | 31 | 58 | −27 | 29 | Relegation to the Second Division |
| 10 | Stranraer (R) | 36 | 4 | 5 | 27 | 25 | 81 | −56 | 17 | Relegation to the Second Division |

Source: RSSSF and statto
Rules for classification: 1) points; 2) goal difference; 3) number of goals scored.
(C) Champions; (P) Promoted; (R) Relegated

== Play-off ==
| Team 1 | Agg. | Team 2 | 1st leg | 2nd leg |
|---|---|---|---|---|
| Aberdeen | 6–2 | Dunfermline Athletic | 3–1 | 3–1 |
