= 1994–95 Scottish League Cup =

1994–95 Scottish Coca-Cola Cup
Tournament details
- Country: Scotland

Final positions
- Champions: Raith Rovers
- Runners-up: Celtic

The 1994–95 Scottish League Cup was the 49th staging of the Scotland's second most prestigious football knockout competition, also known for sponsorship reasons as the Coca-Cola Cup.

The competition was won by Raith Rovers, who defeated Celtic in a penalty shootout after a 2–2 draw in the final at Ibrox Stadium. The final was played at Ibrox because Celtic were using Hampden Park as their home ground during that season while Celtic Park was being rebuilt.

== First round ==
Home team	Score	Away team
Arbroath	(p)1 – 1	Alloa Athletic
Queen of the South	2–0	Albion Rovers
Ross County	3–2	Queen's Park
Stranraer	(p)2 – 2	Cowdenbeath
Berwick Rangers	0 – 0(p)	Montrose
East Fife	1–0	Forfar Athletic
East Stirlingshire	0–2	Inverness Caledonian Thistle
Stenhousemuir	0–4	Meadowbank Thistle

== Second round ==
Home team	Score	Away team
Aberdeen	1–0	Stranraer
Arbroath	1–6	Rangers
Dundee	3–0	Inverness Caledonian Thistle
Dunfermline Athletic	4–1	Meadowbank Thistle
Hamilton Accies	5–0	Clyde
Kilmarnock	4–1	East Fife
Queen of the South	0–3	Hibernian
Ross County	0–5	Raith Rovers
Stirling Albion	0–2	St Johnstone
Ayr United	0–1	Celtic
Dumbarton	0–4	Heart of Midlothian
Falkirk	(p)1 – 1	Montrose
Morton	1 – 1(p)	Airdrieonians
Motherwell	3–1	Clydebank
Partick Thistle	5–0	Brechin City
St Mirren	0–1	Dundee United

== Third round ==
Home team	Score	Away team
Dundee	1–2	Celtic
Hamilton Accies	2 – 2(p)	Dundee United
Heart of Midlothian	2–4	St Johnstone
Motherwell	1–2	Airdrieonians
Raith Rovers	3–2	Kilmarnock
Rangers	1–2	Falkirk
Hibernian	2–0	Dunfermline Athletic
Partick Thistle	0–5	Aberdeen

== Quarter-finals ==
20 September 1994

St Johnstone	1–3	Raith Rovers

McDiarmid Park, Perth
Attendance: 6,287

21 September 1994

Hibernian	1–2	Airdrieonians

Easter Road, Edinburgh
Attendance: 9,578

21 September 1994

Falkirk	1–4	Aberdeen

Brockville Park, Falkirk
Attendance: 9,450

21 September 1994

Celtic	1–0	Dundee United

Hampden Park, Glasgow
Attendance: 28,859

== Semi-finals ==
25 October 1994

Raith Rovers	1–1 (a.e.t.)	Airdrieonians
Penalties
	5–4

McDiarmid Park, Perth
Attendance: 7,260

26 October 1994

Celtic	1–0	Aberdeen

Ibrox Stadium, Glasgow
Attendance: 44,000

== Final ==
27 November 1994

Celtic	2-2 (a.e.t.)	Raith Rovers
Walker 32'; Nicholas 84'	Report	Crawford 19'; Dalziel 86'
Penalties
	5-6

Ibrox Stadium, Glasgow
Attendance: 45,384
