= 2024–25 West of Scotland Football League =

West of Scotland Football League
- Season: 2024–25
- Dates: 27 July 2024 – 17 May 2025
- Champions: Clydebank

The 2024–25 West of Scotland Football League (known as the Greenversity West of Scotland League for sponsorship reasons) was the 5th season of the West of Scotland Football League, with its top division as part of the sixth tier of the Scottish football pyramid system. Beith Juniors were the reigning champions for a second consecutive season, but could only finish eleventh in the Premier Division.

Clydebank won the Premier Division title for the first time, finishing seventeen points clear of Auchinleck Talbot, who finished second in the table for the fourth successive season. They became the first West of Scotland Football League team to be promoted to the Lowland Football League, defeating Musselburgh Athletic 3–1 in the Lowland League play-off.

== Premier Division ==
West of Scotland Football League Premier Division
- Season: 2024–25
- Dates: 27 July 2024 – 17 May 2025
- Champions: Clydebank
- Promoted: Clydebank
- Relegated: Benburb; Darvel; Gartcairn
- Matches: 240
- Goals: 750 (3.13 per match)
- Biggest home win: Auchinleck Talbot 6–0 Glenafton Athletic (5 February 2025)
- Biggest away win: Beith Juniors 2–8 Auchinleck Talbot (3 May 2025)
- Highest scoring: Beith Juniors 7–3 Benburb (1 February 2025); Beith Juniors 2–8 Auchinleck Talbot (3 May 2025)
- Longest winning run: 8 matches: Clydebank
- Longest unbeaten run: 25 matches: Clydebank
- Longest winless run: 12 matches: Darvel
- Longest losing run: 5 matches: Darvel
- All statistics correct as of 17 May 2025.

Having gone the first 25 games unbeaten, Clydebank won their first Premier Division title on 5 April 2025 with a 5–0 win at Benburb and coupled with Johnstone Burgh's 0–1 defeat at Cumnock Juniors, this gave them an unassailable 25-point lead. They were promoted to the 2025–26 Lowland Football League, beating Musselburgh Athletic in the Lowland League play-off.

Promoted from 2023–24 First Division:

- Drumchapel United
- Johnstone Burgh
- Shotts Bon Accord

Relegated to 2024–25 First Division:

- Irvine Meadow
- Kirkintilloch Rob Roy
- Arthurlie

=== Stadia and locations ===
Club	Location	Ground	Surface	Capacity	Seats	Floodlit
Auchinleck Talbot ^{[SFA]}	Auchinleck	Beechwood Park	Grass	3,500	500	Yes
Beith Juniors	Beith	Bellsdale Park	Grass	1,809	0	No
Benburb ^{[SFA]}	Drumoyne, Glasgow	New Tinto Park	Artificial	1,000	0	Yes
Clydebank ^{[SFA]}	Clydebank	Holm Park	Artificial	1,200	0	Yes
Cumnock Juniors ^{[SFA]}	Cumnock	Townhead Park	Artificial	2,000	0	Yes
Darvel ^{[SFA]}	Darvel	Recreation Park	Grass	2,750	60	Yes
Drumchapel United	Drumchapel, Glasgow	Donald Dewar Centre 4G	Artificial	500	0	Yes
Gartcairn	Airdrie	MTC Park	Artificial	500	50	Yes
Glenafton Athletic ^{[SFA]}	New Cumnock	Loch Park	Grass	2,000	250	Yes
Hurlford United	Hurlford	Blair Park	Grass	1,500	0	No
Johnstone Burgh	Johnstone	Keanie Park	Grass	2,000	0	No
Largs Thistle	Largs	Barrfields Park	Artificial	3,000	800	No
Pollok ^{[SFA]}	Pollokshaws, Glasgow	Newlandsfield Park	Grass	2,088	0	Yes
Shotts Bon Accord	Shotts	Hannah Park	Grass	2,000	0	No
St Cadoc's	Drumoyne, Glasgow	New Tinto Park (Note: St Cadoc's are ground-sharing with Benburb at New Tinto Park.)	Artificial	1,000	0	Yes
Troon	Troon	Portland Park	Grass	2,000	100	Yes

Notes

Location of teams in 2024–25 West of Scotland League Premier Division

=== League table ===
Pos	Team	Pld	W	D	L	GF	GA	GD	Pts	Promotion, qualification or relegation
1	Clydebank (C, O, P)	30	24	5	1	67	23	+44	77	Qualification for the Lowland League play-off
2	Auchinleck Talbot	30	17	9	4	64	30	+34	60	
3	Johnstone Burgh (Note: Johnstone Burgh deducted 3 points for fielding an ineligible player in their 2–1 win against Darvel on 22 March.)	30	16	7	7	47	33	+14	52	
4	Troon	30	15	4	11	55	42	+13	49	
5	St Cadoc's	30	15	3	12	48	43	+5	48	
6	Drumchapel United	30	14	4	12	53	46	+7	46	
7	Cumnock Juniors	30	12	7	11	45	41	+4	43	
8	Largs Thistle (Note: Largs Thistle deducted 3 points for fielding an ineligible player.)	30	12	9	9	52	43	+9	42	
9	Pollok	30	10	5	15	34	42	−8	35	
10	Glenafton Athletic	30	9	8	13	43	59	−16	35	
11	Beith Juniors	30	10	5	15	37	54	−17	35	
12	Hurlford United	30	8	8	14	39	51	−12	32	
13	Shotts Bon Accord	30	6	10	14	37	48	−11	28	
14	Benburb (R)	30	5	8	17	44	79	−35	23	Relegation to the First Division
15	Gartcairn (Note: Gartcairn deducted 15 points for using ineligible players.) (R)	30	10	5	15	44	48	−4	20	Relegation to the First Division
16	Darvel (Note: Darvel deducted 3 points for fielding an ineligible player in their 2–2 draw with Shotts Bon Accord on 7 September.) (R)	30	5	7	18	41	68	−27	19	Relegation to the First Division

Source: West of Scotland Football League
Rules for classification: 1) Points; 2) Goal difference; 3) Goals scored
(C) Champions; (O) Play-off winners; (P) Promoted; (R) Relegated

=== Results ===
Home \ Away	AUC	BEI	BNB	CLY	CMN	DAR	DRU	GAR	GLE	HUR	JOB	LRG	PLK	SBA	STC	TRO
Auchinleck Talbot		0–0	1–1	1–1	2–1	2–0	2–1	2–2	6–0	2–1	0–0	1–1	2–1	2–2	3–1	2–1
Beith Juniors	2–8		7–3	1–3	1–2	0–0	0–1	1–2	2–1	2–5	0–0	2–1	0–0	3–0	2–0	0–5
Benburb	0–5	2–2		0–5	0–1	2–2	1–4	1–5	3–0	2–2	1–2	3–3	2–0	0–2	1–2	0–3
Clydebank	2–1	3–0	4–2		1–0	2–1	2–1	3–1	5–2	2–1	0–0	0–3	2–1	1–0	1–1	1–0
Cumnock Juniors	1–2	2–0	2–2	0–2		4–0	0–1	1–1	3–0	1–1	1–0	1–3	1–1	3–3	1–0	2–2
Darvel	2–1	0–3	3–1	1–5	2–3		2–3	2–4	1–2	2–2	1–1	2–1	1–2	1–1	4–1	0–2
Drumchapel United	1–1	1–2	6–2	0–4	3–4	2–1 (Note: Match played at New Tinto Park, Drumoyne.)		0–2	2–0	3–1	1–2	0–2	3–6	2–0	1–2	2–0
Gartcairn	0–1	1–2	1–2	1–3	1–0	2–0	3–1		0–1	2–0	1–3	4–4	0–3	0–3	0–3	4–1
Glenafton Athletic	1–2	2–0	1–1	1–1	1–0	2–2	1–1	2–2		1–1	0–4	1–2	4–0	3–2	4–3	2–2
Hurlford United	0–2	0–1	3–2	1–4	1–3	2–1	1–3	0–0	3–2		2–3	1–0	4–0	1–1	1–0	1–3
Johnstone Burgh	1–1	0–2	2–3	1–3	3–0	2–1	0–3	2–1	2–1	2–1		5–0	2–1	2–1	2–1	3–0
Largs Thistle	3–1	1–0	4–1	0–0	3–3	4–3	2–0	1–2	3–1	0–0	0–0		1–1	2–0	1–3	0–1
Pollok	0–3	2–1	0–1	0–2	0–2	0–2	1–2	1–0	1–2	4–0	1–1	1–1		3–0	0–1	1–0
Shotts Bon Accord	2–3	2–0	3–2	1–2	0–1	2–2	2–2	2–1	1–1	0–0	4–0	2–4	0–1		0–3	1–1
St Cadoc's	1–5	3–0	1–1	0–1	3–1	6–1	0–0	1–0	3–2	1–2	1–0	1–0	1–0	2–0		1–2
Troon	1–0	4–1	3–2	1–2	2–1	4–1	0–3	2–1	1–2	2–1	1–2	3–2	1–2	0–0	7–2	

Source: wosfl.co.uk
Legend: Blue = home team win; Yellow = draw; Red = away team win.

== First Division ==
West of Scotland Football League First Division
- Season: 2024–25
- Dates: 27 July 2024 – 17 May 2025
- Champions: Arthurlie
- Promoted: Arthurlie; Kilwinning Rangers; Renfrew; Rutherglen Glencairn
- Relegated: Ashfield; Blantyre Victoria; Maybole Juniors
- Matches: 240
- Goals: 879 (3.66 per match)
- Biggest home win: 4 matches: 6 goals (Note: The matches were Arthurlie 6–0 Ashfield on 3 August 2024, Kilwinning Rangers 7–1 Ashfield on 25 January 2025, Rutherglen Glencairn 6–0 Ashfield on 8 March 2025 and Cumbernauld United 6–0 Ashfield on 17 May 2025.)
- Biggest away win: Blantyre Victoria 0–8 Arthurlie (23 April 2025)
- Highest scoring: Ardrossan Winton Rovers 7–3 Ashfield (28 September 2024)
- Longest winning run: 7 matches: Arthurlie
- Longest unbeaten run: 10 matches: Arthurlie & Kilwinning Rangers
- Longest winless run: 13 matches: Ashfield
- Longest losing run: 12 matches: Ashfield
- All statistics correct as of 17 May 2025.

Arthurlie won the league title for the first time, sealing the championship on 10 May 2025 with a 2–2 draw at Petershill, giving them an unassailable 4-point lead over their rivals Renfrew and Rutherglen Glencairn.

Relegated from 2023–24 Premier Division:

- Arthurlie
- Kirkintilloch Rob Roy
- Irvine Meadow XI

Promoted from 2023–24 Second Division:

- Ardrossan Winton Rovers
- Vale of Clyde
- Cumbernauld United

Promoted to 2024–25 Premier Division:

- Drumchapel United
- Johnstone Burgh
- Shotts Bon Accord

Relegated to 2024–25 Second Division:

- Cambuslang Rangers
- Whitletts Victoria
- Neilston

=== Stadia and locations ===
Team	Location	Ground	Surface	Capacity	Seats	Floodlit
Ardrossan Winton Rovers	Ardrossan	Winton Park	Grass	3,000	0	No
Arthurlie	Barrhead	Dunterlie Park	Grass	3,000	0	No
Ashfield	Easterhouse, Glasgow	Stepford Football Centre (Note: Ashfield are ground-sharing with Easterhouse Academy at Stepford Football Centre.)	Artificial	500	0	Yes
Blantyre Victoria	Blantyre	Castle Park	Grass	2,500	60	No
Cumbernauld United	Cumbernauld	Guy's Meadow	Grass	2,500	0	No
Irvine Meadow ^{[SFA]}	Irvine	Meadow Park	Grass	5,000	0	Yes
Kilbirnie Ladeside	Kilbirnie	Valefield Park	Grass	1,000	22	No
Kilwinning Rangers ^{[SFA]}	Kilwinning	Buffs Park	Grass	2,800	270	Yes
Kirkintilloch Rob Roy	Kirkintilloch	Kirkintilloch Community Sports Complex	Artificial	1,500	302	Yes
Maybole Juniors	Maybole	Ladywell Stadium	Grass	2,000	0	No
Petershill	Springburn, Glasgow	Petershill Park	Artificial	2,000	500	Yes
Renfrew	Renfrew	New Western Park	Artificial	1,000	0	Yes
Rutherglen Glencairn ^{[SFA]}	Rutherglen	New Southcroft Park	Grass	1,500	0	Yes
St Roch's	Provanmill, Glasgow	James McGrory Park	Grass	2,000	0	No
Thorniewood United	Viewpark	Robertson Park	Grass	3,000	0	No
Vale of Clyde	Tollcross, Glasgow	Fullarton Park	Grass	3,000	150	No

Notes

Location of teams in 2024–25 West of Scotland League First Division
Location of teams in 2024–25 West of Scotland League First Division in the Greater Glasgow area

=== League table ===
Pos	Team	Pld	W	D	L	GF	GA	GD	Pts	Promotion or relegation
1	Arthurlie (C, P)	30	18	6	6	73	33	+40	60	Promotion to the Premier Division
2	Rutherglen Glencairn (P)	30	17	7	6	81	47	+34	58	Promotion to the Premier Division
3	Renfrew (P)	30	16	7	7	71	42	+29	55	Promotion to the Premier Division
4	Kilwinning Rangers (P)	30	16	7	7	58	44	+14	55	Promotion to the Premier Division
5	St Roch's	30	16	4	10	60	47	+13	52	
6	Petershill	30	14	5	11	67	55	+12	47	
7	Thorniewood United	30	14	4	12	63	60	+3	46	
8	Cumbernauld United	30	12	8	10	56	51	+5	44	
9	Kirkintilloch Rob Roy	30	12	7	11	43	41	+2	43	
10	Kilbirnie Ladeside	30	10	10	10	56	50	+6	40	
11	Vale of Clyde	30	10	9	11	43	40	+3	39	
12	Irvine Meadow XI	30	10	6	14	53	57	−4	36	
13	Ardrossan Winton Rovers	30	10	6	14	48	56	−8	36	
14	Maybole Juniors (R)	30	8	5	17	37	60	−23	29	Relegation to the Second Division
15	Blantyre Victoria (Note: Blantyre Victoria deducted 9 points for using ineligible players.) (R)	30	5	6	19	35	80	−45	12	Relegation to the Second Division
16	Ashfield (R)	30	2	3	25	35	116	−81	9	Relegation to the Second Division

Source: West of Scotland Football League
Rules for classification: 1) Points; 2) Goal difference; 3) Goals scored
(C) Champions; (P) Promoted; (R) Relegated

== Second Division ==
West of Scotland Football League Second Division
- Season: 2024–25
- Dates: 27 July 2024 – 17 May 2025
- Champions: Neilston
- Promoted: Lanark United; Muirkirk Juniors; Neilston; Whitletts Victoria
- Relegated: Craigmark Burntonians; St Anthony's; Yoker Athletic
- Matches: 240
- Goals: 949 (3.95 per match)
- Biggest home win: Larkhall Thistle 8–1 Craigmark Burntonians (8 March 2025)
- Biggest away win: Caledonian Locomotives 0–8 Whitletts Victoria (7 September 2024)
- Highest scoring: Caledonian Locomotives 6–5 Bonnyton Thistle (22 March 2025)
- Longest winning run: 11 matches: Neilston
- Longest unbeaten run: 11 matches: Neilston
- Longest winless run: 10 matches: Craigmark Burntonians
- Longest losing run: 9 matches: Craigmark Burntonians & Yoker Athletic
- All statistics correct as of 17 May 2025.

Neilston won the Second Division title by one point, having been one of four teams that could have clinched the title going into the final-day matches.

Relegated from 2023–24 First Division:

- Cambuslang Rangers
- Whitletts Victoria
- Neilston

Promoted from 2023–24 Third Division:

- Lanark United
- Lesmahagow Juniors
- Bellshill Athletic

Promoted to 2024–25 First Division:

- Ardrossan Winton Rovers
- Vale of Clyde
- Cumbernauld United

Relegated to 2024–25 Third Division:

- Glasgow Perthshire
- Wishaw
- Glasgow University

=== Stadia and locations ===
Team	Location	Ground	Surface	Capacity	Seats	Floodlit
Bellshill Athletic	Bellshill	Rockburn Park	Grass	1,000	0	No
Bonnyton Thistle ^{[SFA]}	Kilmarnock	Bonnyton Park	Artificial	1,000	100	Yes
Caledonian Locomotives	Springburn, Glasgow	Petershill Park (Note: Caledonian Locomotives are ground-sharing with Petershill at Petershill Park.)	Artificial	1,500	500	Yes
Cambuslang Rangers	Cambuslang	Somervell Park	Grass	3,000	0	No
Craigmark Burntonians	Dalmellington	Station Park	Grass	2,200	0	No
Forth Wanderers	Forth	Kingshill Park	Grass	3,500	0	No
Kilsyth Rangers	Kilsyth	Duncansfield	Grass	2,000	0	No
Lanark United	Lanark	Moor Park	Grass	1,500	0	No
Larkhall Thistle	Larkhall	Gasworks Park	Grass	2,000	0	No
Lesmahagow Juniors	Lesmahagow	Craighead Park	Grass	3,500	0	No
Maryhill	Maryhill, Glasgow	Lochburn Park	Grass	1,800	205	Yes
Muirkirk Juniors	Muirkirk	Burnside Park	Grass	2,300	0	No
Neilston	Neilston	Brig O' Lea Stadium	Grass	2,000	0	Yes
St Anthony's	Shieldhall, Glasgow	McKenna Park	Grass	1,000	0	No
Whitletts Victoria	Ayr	New Voluntary Park	Artificial	TBC	TBC	Yes
Yoker Athletic	Clydebank	Holm Park	Artificial	3,500	0	Yes

Notes

Location of teams in 2024–25 West of Scotland League Second Division
Location of teams in 2024–25 West of Scotland League Second Division in the Greater Glasgow area

=== League table ===
Pos	Team	Pld	W	D	L	GF	GA	GD	Pts	Promotion or relegation
1	Neilston (C, P)	30	21	4	5	82	40	+42	67	Promotion to the First Division
2	Whitletts Victoria (P)	30	21	3	6	89	44	+45	66	Promotion to the First Division
3	Muirkirk Juniors (P)	30	21	3	6	71	33	+38	66	Promotion to the First Division
4	Lanark United (P)	30	20	3	7	75	37	+38	63	Promotion to the First Division
5	Larkhall Thistle	30	18	2	10	55	35	+20	56	
6	Kilsyth Rangers	30	12	7	11	49	51	−2	43	
7	Bonnyton Thistle	30	13	4	13	56	59	−3	43	
8	Maryhill	30	11	8	11	65	57	+8	41	
9	Bellshill Athletic	30	12	5	13	51	57	−6	41	
10	Lesmahagow	30	10	6	14	60	75	−15	36	
11	Caledonian Locomotives	30	9	6	15	56	77	−21	33	
12	Forth Wanderers	30	9	5	16	63	78	−15	32	
13	Cambuslang Rangers	30	8	5	17	58	80	−22	29	
14	Yoker Athletic (R)	30	7	7	16	43	55	−12	28	Relegation to the Third Division
15	St Anthony's (R)	30	8	1	21	44	74	−30	25	Relegation to the Third Division
16	Craigmark Burntonians (R)	30	4	3	23	32	97	−65	15	Relegation to the Third Division

Source: West of Scotland Football League
Rules for classification: 1) Points; 2) Goal difference; 3) Goals scored
(C) Champions; (P) Promoted; (R) Relegated

== Third Division ==
West of Scotland Football League Third Division
- Season: 2024–25
- Dates: 27 July 2024 – 17 May 2025
- Champions: Thorn Athletic
- Promoted: Greenock Juniors; Kilsyth Athletic; Thorn Athletic; Threave Rovers
- Relegated: Irvine Victoria; Vale of Leven; Wishaw
- Matches: 240
- Goals: 1,037 (4.32 per match)
- Biggest home win: Kilsyth Athletic 8–0 Wishaw (14 December 2024)
- Biggest away win: Vale of Leven 0–6 Threave Rovers (8 February 2025)
- Highest scoring: Thorn Athletic 6–7 Glasgow University (7 December 2024); Lugar Boswell Thistle 9–4 Wishaw (29 March 2025)
- Longest winning run: 9 matches: Kilsyth Athletic
- Longest unbeaten run: 12 matches: Thorn Athletic
- Longest winless run: 16 matches: Wishaw
- Longest losing run: 7 matches: Irvine Victoria & Wishaw
- All statistics correct as of 17 May 2025.

Thorn Athletic won their first league title on 26 April 2025; a 6–1 victory over Irvine Victoria and coupled with a 2–5 defeat for Threave Rovers at Glasgow University gave Thorn Athletic an unassailable points lead.

Relegated from 2023–24 Second Division:

- Glasgow Perthshire
- Wishaw
- Glasgow University

Promoted from 2023–24 Fourth Division:

- Glenvale
- Thorn Athletic
- Lugar Boswell Thistle

Promoted to 2024–25 Second Division:

- Lanark United
- Lesmahagow Juniors
- Bellshill Athletic

Relegated to 2024–25 Fourth Division:

- Port Glasgow Juniors
- Kello Rovers
- West Park United

=== Stadia and locations ===
Team	Location	Ground	Surface	Capacity	Seats	Floodlit
Ardeer Thistle	Stevenston	Ardeer Stadium	Grass	3,500	0	No
Dalry Thistle	Dalry	Merksworth Park	Grass	3,000	0	No
Finnart	Springburn, Glasgow	Springburn Park	Artificial		0	Yes
Girvan ^{[SFA]}	Girvan	Hamilton Park	Grass	5,000	200	No
Glasgow Perthshire	Possilpark, Glasgow	Keppoch Park	Grass	1,800	0	No
Glasgow University ^{[SFA]}	Airdrie	Excelsior Stadium	Artificial	10,171	10,171	Yes
Glasgow United	Shettleston, Glasgow	Greenfield Park	Grass	1,800	10	No
Glenvale	Paisley	Ferguslie Sports Centre	Artificial	1,000	0	Yes
Greenock Juniors	Greenock	Ravenscraig Stadium	Grass	6,000	1,000	Yes
Irvine Victoria	Irvine	Victoria Park	Grass	1,800	0	No
Kilsyth Athletic	Kilsyth	Kilsyth Sports Field	Artificial		0	No
Lugar Boswell Thistle	Lugar	Rosebank Park	Grass	2,000	0	No
Thorn Athletic	Johnstone	Thorn Athletic Sports Academy	Grass		0	No
Threave Rovers ^{[SFA]}	Castle Douglas	Meadow Park	Grass	1,500		Yes
Vale of Leven	Alexandria	Millburn Park	Grass	3,000	0	No
Wishaw	Wishaw	Beltane Park	Grass	500	0	No

Location of teams in 2024–25 West of Scotland League Third Division

=== League table ===
Pos	Team	Pld	W	D	L	GF	GA	GD	Pts	Promotion or relegation
1	Thorn Athletic (C, P)	30	21	5	4	94	47	+47	68	Promotion to the Second Division
2	Kilsyth Athletic (P)	30	19	5	6	83	40	+43	62	Promotion to the Second Division
3	Threave Rovers (P)	30	19	4	7	95	50	+45	61	Promotion to the Second Division
4	Greenock Juniors (P)	30	18	6	6	71	36	+35	60	Promotion to the Second Division
5	Ardeer Thistle	30	17	4	9	77	46	+31	55	
6	Glasgow University	30	14	5	11	74	63	+11	47	
7	Dalry Thistle	30	12	8	10	58	51	+7	44	
8	Finnart	30	13	2	15	56	75	−19	41	
9	Glenvale	30	11	6	13	54	67	−13	39	
10	Girvan	30	10	6	14	58	62	−4	36	
11	Lugar Boswell Thistle	30	10	6	14	65	73	−8	36	
12	Glasgow Perthshire	30	11	3	16	58	78	−20	36	
13	Glasgow United	30	11	2	17	52	68	−16	35	
14	Vale of Leven (R)	30	6	6	18	50	81	−31	24	Relegation to the Fourth Division
15	Irvine Victoria (R)	30	7	3	20	53	103	−50	24	Relegation to the Fourth Division
16	Wishaw (R)	30	3	5	22	39	97	−58	14	Relegation to the Fourth Division

Source: West of Scotland Football League
Rules for classification: 1) Points; 2) Goal difference; 3) Goals scored
(C) Champions; (P) Promoted; (R) Relegated

== Fourth Division ==
West of Scotland Football League Fourth Division
- Season: 2024–25
- Dates: 27 July 2024 – 17 May 2025
- Champions: Knightswood
- Promoted: Easterhouse Academy; Kello Rovers; Knightswood; Port Glasgow Juniors
- Matches: 240
- Goals: 1,032 (4.3 per match)
- Biggest home win: Easterhouse Academy 9–0 BSC Glasgow (14 December 2024)
- Biggest away win: BSC Glasgow 0–11 Port Glasgow Juniors (15 February 2025)
- Highest scoring: BSC Glasgow 4–7 St. Peter's (31 July 2024); BSC Glasgow 0–11 Port Glasgow Juniors (15 February 2025)
- Longest winning run: 9 matches: Port Glasgow Juniors
- Longest unbeaten run: 19 matches: Knightswood
- Longest winless run: 25 matches: BSC Glasgow
- Longest losing run: 25 matches: BSC Glasgow
- All statistics correct as of 17 May 2025.

Knightswood won the Fourth Division title on the final day, finishing three points clear of Port Glasgow Juniors.

Relegated from 2023–24 Third Division:

- Port Glasgow Juniors
- Kello Rovers
- West Park United

Promoted to 2024–25 Third Division:

- Glenvale
- Thorn Athletic
- Lugar Boswell Thistle

=== Stadia and locations ===
Team	Location	Ground	Surface	Capacity	Seats	Floodlit
BSC Glasgow	Yoker, Glasgow	Peterson Park	Grass	500	0	No
Campbeltown Pupils	Campbeltown	Kintyre Park	Grass		0	No
Carluke Rovers ^{[SFA]}	Carluke	John Cumming Stadium	Artificial	1,500	0	Yes
East Kilbride Thistle	East Kilbride	The Showpark	Grass	2,300	0	No
Easterhouse Academy	Easterhouse, Glasgow	Stepford Park	Artificial		0	Yes
Eglinton	Kilwinning	Kilwinning Community Sports Club	Artificial		0	Yes
Giffnock SC	Giffnock	Eastwood Park	Artificial		0	Yes
Kello Rovers	Kirkconnel	Nithsdale Park	Grass	1,000	0	No
Knightswood	Knightswood, Glasgow	Scotstoun Sports Campus	Artificial		0	Yes
Newmains United	Newmains	Victoria Park	Grass	1,000	0	No
Port Glasgow Juniors	Port Glasgow	Parklea Community Stadium	Artificial	2,000	0	Yes
Rossvale	Kirkintilloch	Kirkintilloch Community Sports Complex (Note: Rossvale are ground-sharing with Kirkintilloch Rob Roy at Kirkintilloch Community Sports Complex.)	Artificial	1,500	302	Yes
Royal Albert	Stonehouse	Tileworks Park	Grass	1,000	0	No
Saltcoats Victoria	Saltcoats	Campbell Park	Grass	2,500	0	No
St. Peter's	Renfrew	New Western Park (Note: St. Peter's are ground-sharing with Renfrew at New Western Park.)	Artificial	1,000	0	Yes
West Park United	Bishopbriggs	Huntershill Sports Hub	Artificial	1,000	0	Yes

Notes

Location of teams in 2024–25 West of Scotland League Fourth Division
Location of teams in 2024–25 West of Scotland League Fourth Division in the Glasgow area
Location of teams in 2024–25 West of Scotland League Fourth Division in the Argyll and Bute area

=== League table ===
Pos	Team	Pld	W	D	L	GF	GA	GD	Pts	Promotion or qualification
1	Knightswood (C, P)	30	24	4	2	91	32	+59	76	Promotion to the Third Division
2	Port Glasgow (P)	30	23	4	3	110	38	+72	73	Promotion to the Third Division
3	Kello Rovers (P)	30	17	9	4	77	35	+42	60	Promotion to the Third Division
4	Easterhouse Academy (P)	30	18	3	9	84	46	+38	57	Promotion to the Third Division
5	West Park United	30	15	6	9	61	43	+18	51	
6	Eglinton	30	15	3	12	73	59	+14	48	
7	Rossvale	30	12	7	11	73	53	+20	43	
8	Carluke Rovers	30	12	5	13	57	51	+6	41	
9	Royal Albert	30	12	5	13	55	51	+4	41	
10	Giffnock SC	30	11	6	13	63	68	−5	39	
11	St. Peter's	30	11	5	14	53	67	−14	38	
12	East Kilbride Thistle	30	11	4	15	61	70	−9	37	
13	Newmains United	30	10	6	14	52	74	−22	36	
14	Saltcoats Victoria	30	7	6	17	62	81	−19	27	
15	Campbeltown Pupils	30	3	3	24	39	99	−60	12	
16	BSC Glasgow	30	1	0	29	21	165	−144	3	

Source: West of Scotland Football League
Rules for classification: 1) Points; 2) Goal difference; 3) Goals scored
(C) Champions; (P) Promoted

== Notes ==
^{SFA} Club with an SFA licence eligible to participate in the Lowland League promotion play-off (should they win the Premier Division), and also compete in the Scottish Cup.
