= 2020–21 West of Scotland Football League =

West of Scotland Football League
- Season: 2020–21

The 2020–21 West of Scotland Football League (known as the PDM Buildbase West of Scotland League for sponsorship reasons) was the inaugural season of the West of Scotland Football League, with its top division as part of the sixth tier of the Scottish football pyramid system.

Originally, the league was set to begin in October 2020 with 67 teams split across two tiers and four leagues. However, as a result of the COVID-19 pandemic, 14 teams considered pulling out of the league before nine confirmed it was not financially viable to compete while supporters were not allowed into football grounds. The league decided not to penalise teams who chose to withdraw due to the pandemic and introduced proposals to have no promotion and relegation in the inaugural season.

On 11 January 2021 the league was suspended by the Scottish Football Association due to the escalating pandemic situation. On 17 March, the board declared the season null and void.

== Premier Division ==
West of Scotland Football League Premier Division
- Season: 2020–21
- Dates: 24 October 2020 – 17 March 2021 (abandoned)
- Matches: 48 (Note: 3 matches and 11 goals were expunged from the overall tallies, following Benburb's withdrawal from the league.)
- Goals: 164 (3.42 per match)
- Biggest home win: Clydebank 4–0 Hurlford United (31 October 2020); Clydebank 4–0 Rutherglen Glencairn (5 December 2020)
- Biggest away win: Bonnyton Thistle 1–6 Blantyre Victoria (5 December 2020) (Note: Benburb 0–5 Beith Juniors on 7 November 2020 was expunged, following Benburb's withdrawal from the league.)
- Highest scoring: Rossvale 3–4 Blantyre Victoria (28 November 2020); Bonnyton Thistle 1–6 Blantyre Victoria (5 December 2020); Darvel 5–2 Troon (27 December 2020)
- Longest winning run: 5 matches: Clydebank
- Longest unbeaten run: 7 matches: Clydebank
- Longest winless run: 7 matches: Cumbernauld United
- Longest losing run: 7 matches: Cumbernauld United
- All statistics correct as of 29 December 2020.

=== Teams ===
The Premier Division initially consisted of all 16 teams from the 2019–20 West Region Premiership, the top 3 teams based on points per game from the 2019–20 West Region Championship, and Bonnyton Thistle from the 2019–20 South of Scotland Football League.

Due to the start of the season being delayed by the COVID-19 pandemic, the division was split into two groups so that the number of games played by each team would be reduced from 38 to 28.

However, after the start date for the league was confirmed, five teams withdrew so the two groups were scrapped and the division reverted to 28 games played on a home and away basis, with no relegation from the Premier Division at the end of the season.

Location of teams in 2020–21 West of Scotland League Premier Division

=== Stadia and locations ===
Club	Location	Ground	Capacity	Seats	Floodlit
Beith Juniors	Beith	Bellsdale Park	1,500	0	No
Benburb	Drumoyne, Glasgow	New Tinto Park	1,000	500	Yes
Blantyre Victoria	Blantyre	Castle Park	2,500	0	No
Bonnyton Thistle	Kilmarnock	Bonnyton Park	1,000	100	Yes
Clydebank	Clydebank	Holm Park	3,500	0	Yes
Cumbernauld United	Cumbernauld	Guy's Meadow	2,500	0	No
Darvel	Darvel	Recreation Park	2,200	60	No
Hurlford United	Hurlford	Blair Park	1,500	0	No
Irvine Meadow XI	Irvine	Meadow Park	5,200	700	Yes
Kilwinning Rangers	Kilwinning	Buffs Park	1,500	0	No
Kirkintilloch Rob Roy	Cumbernauld	Guy's Meadow	2,500	0	No
Largs Thistle	Largs	Barrfields Stadium	4,500	800	No
Rossvale	Drumoyne, Glasgow	New Tinto Park	1,000	500	Yes
Rutherglen Glencairn	Rutherglen	New Southcroft Park	1,500	0	Yes
Troon	Troon	Portland Park	2,600	0	No

Notes

1. Kirkintilloch Rob Roy were ground-sharing with Cumbernauld United at Guy's Meadow.
2. Rossvale were ground-sharing with Benburb at New Tinto Park.

=== Withdrawn ===
Club	Location	Ground	Capacity	Seats	Floodlit
Auchinleck Talbot	Auchinleck	Beechwood Park	4,000	500	Yes
Cumnock Juniors	Cumnock	Townhead Park	3,000	0	Yes
Glenafton Athletic	New Cumnock	Loch Park	3,400	250	No
Kilbirnie Ladeside	Kilbirnie	Valefield Park	3,000	0	No
Pollok	Pollokshaws, Glasgow	Newlandsfield Park	4,000	0	No

=== League table ===
Pos	Team	Pld	W	D	L	GF	GA	GD	Pts	Promotion, qualification or relegation
1	Clydebank	7	6	1	0	20	3	+17	19	
2	Troon	7	5	1	1	14	9	+5	16	
3	Kilwinning Rangers	7	5	0	2	14	9	+5	15	
4	Irvine Meadow XI	7	4	1	2	10	7	+3	13	
5	Darvel	5	4	0	1	15	3	+12	12	
6	Largs Thistle	7	3	2	2	11	7	+4	11	
7	Blantyre Victoria	7	3	1	3	17	17	0	10	
8	Hurlford United	7	3	1	3	10	14	−4	10	
9	Rossvale	9	2	3	4	14	15	−1	9	
10	Beith Juniors	5	1	4	0	7	6	+1	7	
11	Kirkintilloch Rob Roy	7	2	0	5	10	16	−6	6	
12	Bonnyton Thistle	8	2	0	6	9	21	−12	6	
13	Rutherglen Glencairn	6	1	0	5	5	13	−8	3	
14	Cumbernauld United	7	0	0	7	8	24	−16	0	
15	Benburb	0	0	0	0	0	0	0	0	Withdrawn; record expunged

Source: West of Scotland Football League
Rules for classification: 1) Points; 2) Goal difference; 3) Goals scored

=== Results ===
Home \ Away	BEI	BLV	BON	CLY	CMU	DAR	HUR	IVM	KWN	KRR	LRG	ROS	RUG	TRO
Beith Juniors	—							0–0		2–1		1–1		2–2
Blantyre Victoria		—				0–4	2–2				1–3			
Bonnyton Thistle		1–6	—	1–2	2–1									0–3
Clydebank				—	4–1		4–0					1–1	4–0	
Cumbernauld United					—	0–3				1–4				
Darvel						—			0–1	3–0				5–2 (Note: Match played at Townhead Park, Cumnock.)
Hurlford United			1–2				—			2–1			2–1	
Irvine Meadow XI		3–2	2–0				1–2	—	1–2					
Kilwinning Rangers		1–2			4–2		3–1		—		1–2	2–1		
Kirkintilloch Rob Roy			4–2	0–4						—				
Largs Thistle	2–2			0–1	4–1			0–1			—	0–0		
Rossvale		3–4			3–2			1–2				—	3–1	
Rutherglen Glencairn			2–1										—	1–2
Troon										2–0		2–1	1–0	—

Source: West of Scotland Football League
Legend: Blue = home team win; Yellow = draw; Red = away team win.

== Tier 7 ==
=== Conference A ===
==== Stadia and locations ====
Team	Location	Home ground	Capacity	Seats	Floodlit
Annbank United	Annbank	New Pebble Park	2,600	0	No
Ardeer Thistle	Stevenston	Ardeer Stadium	3,500	0	No
Ashfield	Possilpark, Glasgow	Ashfield Stadium	3,500	600	Yes
Bellshill Athletic	Bellshill	Rockburn Park	500	0	No
Craigmark Burntonians	Dalmellington	Station Park	2,200	0	No
Glasgow University ^{[SFA]}	Airdrie	Excelsior Stadium	10,101	10,101	Yes
Kello Rovers	Kirkconnel	Nithside Park	1,700	0	No
Maryhill	Maryhill, Glasgow	Lochburn Park	1,800	205	Yes
Maybole Juniors	Maybole	Ladywell Stadium	2,000	0	No
Muirkirk Juniors	Muirkirk	Burnside Park	2,300	0	No
Renfrew	Renfrew	New Western Park	1,000	0	Yes
St Roch's	Provanmill, Glasgow	James McGrory Park	2,000	0	No

Notes

1. Glasgow University are ground-sharing with Airdrieonians at the Excelsior Stadium.

==== League table ====
Pos	Team	Pld	W	D	L	GF	GA	GD	Pts
1	Annbank United	7	5	2	0	17	8	+9	17
2	Bellshill Athletic	7	4	2	1	22	14	+8	14
3	Muirkirk Juniors	7	3	2	2	14	10	+4	11
4	Renfrew	5	2	3	0	12	6	+6	9
5	Craigmark Burntonians	7	2	3	2	16	15	+1	9
6	Glasgow University	6	2	2	2	10	11	−1	8
7	Kello Rovers	5	2	1	2	11	9	+2	7
8	St Roch's	5	2	1	2	11	9	+2	7
9	Maryhill	6	2	1	3	6	9	−3	7
10	Maybole Juniors	6	2	0	4	12	11	+1	6
11	Ashfield	5	1	1	3	14	17	−3	4
12	Ardeer Thistle	6	0	0	6	7	33	−26	0

Source: West of Scotland Football League
Rules for classification: 1) Points; 2) Goal difference; 3) Goals scored

=== Conference B ===
==== Stadia and locations ====
Team	Location	Home ground	Capacity	Seats	Floodlit
Carluke Rovers	Carluke	John Cumming Stadium	1,500	0	Yes
Forth Wanderers	Forth	Kingshill Park	3,500	0	No
Gartcairn	Airdrie	MTC Park	500	0	Yes
Greenock Juniors	Greenock	Ravenscraig Stadium	6,000	1,000	Yes
Irvine Victoria	Irvine	Victoria Park	1,800	0	No
Johnstone Burgh	Johnstone	Keanie Park	5,000	0	No
Lugar Boswell Thistle	Lugar	Rosebank Park	2,000	0	No
Neilston	Neilston	Brig-o-Lea Stadium	2,000	0	Yes
Port Glasgow	Port Glasgow	Port Glasgow Community Stadium	2,000	0	Yes
St Cadoc's	Shieldhall, Glasgow	McKenna Park	1,000	0	No
Vale of Clyde	Tollcross, Glasgow	Fullarton Park	2,500	0	No
Vale of Leven	Alexandria	Millburn Park	3,000	0	No
Wishaw	Wishaw	Beltane Park	1,000	0	No

Notes

1. St Cadoc's are ground-sharing with St Anthony's at McKenna Park.

==== League table ====
Pos	Team	Pld	W	D	L	GF	GA	GD	Pts
1	Neilston	8	8	0	0	31	6	+25	24
2	Greenock Juniors	8	6	1	1	23	8	+15	19
3	Johnstone Burgh	7	6	1	0	18	4	+14	19
4	St Cadoc's	8	6	0	2	22	5	+17	18
5	Port Glasgow	9	6	0	3	28	18	+10	18
6	Forth Wanderers	7	3	1	3	16	16	0	10
7	Wishaw	8	3	1	4	11	17	−6	10
8	Gartcairn	7	2	1	4	16	23	−7	7
9	Vale of Clyde	7	1	2	4	13	22	−9	5
10	Carluke Rovers	7	1	1	5	12	25	−13	4
11	Irvine Victoria	7	1	0	6	10	27	−17	3
12	Lugar Boswell Thistle	7	0	2	5	9	21	−12	2
13	Vale of Leven	6	0	0	6	4	21	−17	0

Source: West of Scotland Football League
Rules for classification: 1) Points; 2) Goal difference; 3) Goals scored

=== Conference C ===
==== Stadia and locations ====
Team	Location	Home ground	Capacity	Seats	Floodlit
Drumchapel United	Drumchapel, Glasgow	Donald Dewar Centre	TBC	0	Yes
East Kilbride Thistle	East Kilbride	The Showpark	2,300	0	No
Glasgow Perthshire	Possilpark, Glasgow	Keppoch Park	1,800	0	No
Kilsyth Rangers	Kilsyth	Duncansfield	2,000	0	No
Lanark United	Lanark	Moor Park	4,000	0	No
Newmains United	Newmains	Victoria Park	1,000	0	No
St Anthony's	Shieldhall, Glasgow	McKenna Park	1,000	0	No
Thorniewood United	Viewpark	Robertson Park	3,000	0	No
Yoker Athletic	Clydebank	Holm Park	3,500	0	Yes

==== League table ====
Pos	Team	Pld	W	D	L	GF	GA	GD	Pts
1	Kilsyth Rangers	6	5	1	0	21	5	+16	16
2	Drumchapel United	7	4	0	3	16	14	+2	12
3	Thorniewood United	5	3	1	1	10	4	+6	10
4	Lanark United	6	3	1	2	15	13	+2	10
5	Yoker Athletic	7	3	1	3	11	13	−2	10
6	Glasgow Perthshire	5	1	1	3	14	14	0	4
7	East Kilbride Thistle	5	1	1	3	6	14	−8	4
8	Newmains United	4	1	0	3	4	11	−7	3
9	St Anthony's	5	0	2	3	5	14	−9	2

Source: West of Scotland Football League
Rules for classification: 1) Points; 2) Goal difference; 3) Goals scored

=== Withdrawn ===
Team	Location	Home ground	Capacity	Seats	Floodlit
Ardrossan Winton Rovers	Ardrossan	Winton Park	3,000	80	Yes
Arthurlie	Barrhead	Dunterlie Park	3,000	0	No
Cambuslang Rangers	Cambuslang	Somervell Park	3,000	0	No
Dalry Thistle	Dalry	Merksworth Park	3,000	0	No
Girvan ^{[SFA]}	Girvan	Hamilton Park	5,000	200	No
Larkhall Thistle	Larkhall	Gasworks Park	2,000	0	No
Lesmahagow	Lesmahagow	Craighead Park	3,500	0	No
Petershill	Springburn, Glasgow	Petershill Park	1,500	500	Yes
Royal Albert	Stonehouse	Tileworks Park	1,000	0	No
Saltcoats Victoria	Saltcoats	Campbell Park	2,500	0	No
Shettleston	Shettleston, Glasgow	Greenfield Park	1,800	10	No
Shotts Bon Accord	Shotts	Hannah Park	4,000	0	Yes
Whitletts Victoria	Ayr	Dam Park Stadium	3,000	478	Yes

== Notes ==
^{SFA} Club with an SFA Licence (as of July 2020) eligible to participate in the Lowland League promotion play-off should they win the Premier Division.
