= Stephen Whalen =

Scottish footballer (born 1998)

Personal information
- Date of birth: 3 May 1982 (age 44)
- Place of birth: Irvine, Scotland
- Position: Forward

Senior career*
Years	Team	Apps	(Gls)
1998–2001	Greenock Morton	45	(8)
2001–2003	Livingston	0	(0)
2001–2002	→ Alloa (loan)	5	(0)
2003	→ Ayr Utd (loan)	12	(5)
2003–2004	Ayr Utd	8	(1)
2004–2007	Craigmark Burntonians		
2007–2011	Irvine Meadow		
- * Club domestic league appearances and goals

Stephen Whalen (born 3 May 1982) is a Scottish former professional footballer who played as a forward for Ayr Utd and Livingston.

== Club career ==
=== Greenock Morton and Livingston ===
Whalen began his career at Greenock Morton where he scored 8 goals in 45 appearances. He signed for Livingston in 2001, but left the club without making a single first team appearance.

=== Alloa and Ayr Utd ===
During his time at Livi, the forward spent a couple of loan spells at Alloa and Ayr Utd. He impressed during his loan spell at Somerset Park and the Honest Men signed him permanently in 2003.

=== Juniors ===
He joined West of Scotland Football League side Craigmark Burntonians in 2004.

Whalen also had a spell at Irvine Meadow.
