= 2025–26 West of Scotland Football League =

West of Scotland Football League
- Season: 2025–26
- Dates: 26 July 2025 – 16 May 2026
- Champions: Auchinleck Talbot

The 2025–26 West of Scotland Football League (known as the Greenversity West of Scotland League for sponsorship reasons) was the sixth season of the West of Scotland Football League, with its top division as part of the sixth tier of the Scottish football pyramid system.

From the 2026–27 season, a new Lowland Football League structure is being introduced with two divisions of 16 teams running concurrently known as Lowland League East and Lowland League West. As a result, the 2025–26 season was a transitional season with 9 teams from the Premier Division promoted to Lowland League West.

After four previous runner-up finishes, Auchinleck Talbot won the Premier Division for the first time, finishing six points clear of Cumnock Juniors.

== Background ==
At the Lowland Football League AGM in May 2025, a new league structure was announced to be introduced from the 2026–27 season. The league is transitioning into two parallel divisions to be known as Lowland League East and Lowland League West. Membership would be based on geographic boundaries with the South of Scotland Football League and the West of Scotland Football League becoming feeder leagues for Lowland League West. To fill league membership up to 16 teams plus one guest team, two teams were promoted from the 2025–26 South of Scotland Football League alongside as many teams as necessary from the 2025–26 West of Scotland Football League Premier Division from those eligible. To be eligible, a club must be club licensed with the Scottish Football Association.

After Clydebank were promoted to the Lowland League, one new club – East Kilbride YM – were admitted to the league.

== Premier Division ==
West of Scotland Football League Premier Division
- Season: 2025–26
- Dates: 26 July 2025 – 16 May 2026
- Champions: Auchinleck Talbot
- Promoted: Auchinleck Talbot; Beith Juniors; Cumnock Juniors; Johnstone Burgh; Kilwinning Rangers; Largs Thistle; Pollok; Renfrew; Troon
- Matches: 240
- Goals: 841 (3.5 per match)
- Biggest home win: Pollok 9–1 St Cadoc's (16 May 2026)
- Biggest away win: Drumchapel United 2–8 Kilwinning Rangers (12 August 2025); Drumchapel United 0–6 Arthurlie (4 April 2026)
- Highest scoring: Drumchapel United 2–8 Kilwinning Rangers (12 August 2025); St Cadoc's 5–5 Arthurlie (17 January 2026); Pollok 9–1 St Cadoc's (16 May 2026)
- Longest winning run: 9 matches: Cumnock Juniors
- Longest unbeaten run: 14 matches: Auchinleck Talbot
- Longest winless run: 20 matches: St Cadoc's
- Longest losing run: 12 matches: St Cadoc's
- All statistics correct as of 16 May 2026.

Having finished as runners-up in each of the four previously completed Premier Division seasons, Auchinleck Talbot won the Premier Division for the first time, going the last fourteen games unbeaten to overhaul Cumnock Juniors and Troon, ultimately winning the league by six points from Cumnock Juniors.

=== Team changes ===
Defending champions Clydebank were promoted to the 2025–26 Lowland Football League. Benburb, Gartcairn and Darvel were relegated to the First Division while Arthurlie, Rutherglen Glencairn, Renfrew and Kilwinning Rangers were promoted.

=== Stadia and locations ===
Club	Location	Ground	Surface	Capacity	Seats	Floodlit	Ref.
Arthurlie	Barrhead	Dunterlie Park	Grass	3,000	0	No	
Auchinleck Talbot ^{[SFA]}	Auchinleck	Beechwood Park	Grass	3,500	500	Yes	
Beith Juniors ^{[SFA]}	Beith	Bellsdale Park	Grass	1,809	0	Yes	
Cumnock Juniors ^{[SFA]}	Cumnock	Townhead Park	Artificial	2,000	0	Yes	
Drumchapel United ^{[SFA]}	Drumchapel, Glasgow	Donald Dewar Centre	Artificial	500	0	Yes	
Glenafton Athletic ^{[SFA]}	New Cumnock	Loch Park	Grass	2,000	250	Yes	
Hurlford United	Hurlford	Blair Park	Grass	1,500	0	No	
Johnstone Burgh ^{[SFA]}	Johnstone	Keanie Park	Grass	2,393	0	Yes	
Kilwinning Rangers ^{[SFA]}	Kilwinning	Buffs Park	Grass	2,000	0	Yes	
Largs Thistle ^{[SFA]}	Largs	Barrfields Park	Artificial	3,000	800	Yes	
Pollok ^{[SFA]}	Pollokshaws, Glasgow	Newlandsfield Park	Grass	2,088	0	Yes	
Renfrew ^{[SFA]}	Renfrew	New Western Park	Artificial	1,000	0	Yes	
Rutherglen Glencairn ^{[SFA]}	Rutherglen	Hamish B Allan Stadium	Grass	1,500	0	Yes	
Shotts Bon Accord	Shotts	Hannah Park	Grass	2,000	0	No	
St Cadoc's ^{[SFA]}	Drumoyne, Glasgow	New Tinto Park (Note: St Cadoc's are ground-sharing with Benburb at New Tinto Park.)	Artificial	1,000	0	Yes	
Troon ^{[SFA]}	Troon	Portland Park	Grass	2,000	0	Yes	

Notes

2025–26 West of Scotland Football League Premier Division
Team locations:
1 Arthurlie
2 Auchinleck Talbot
3 Beith Juniors
4 Cumnock Juniors
5 Drumchapel United
6 Glenafton Athletic
7 Hurlford United
8 Johnstone Burgh
9 Kilwinning Rangers
10 Largs Thistle
11 Pollok
12 Renfrew
13 Rutherglen Glencairn
14 St Cadoc's
15 Shotts Bon Accord
16 Troon

=== League table ===
Pos	Team	Pld	W	D	L	GF	GA	GD	Pts	Promotion, qualification or relegation
1	Auchinleck Talbot (C, P)	30	22	4	4	80	27	+53	70	Promotion to Lowland League West
2	Cumnock Juniors (P)	30	20	4	6	58	29	+29	64	Promotion to Lowland League West
3	Troon (P)	30	19	5	6	59	36	+23	62	Promotion to Lowland League West
4	Pollok (P)	30	15	2	13	51	42	+9	47	Promotion to Lowland League West
5	Largs Thistle (Note: Largs Thistle deducted 3 points for fielding an ineligible player.) (P)	30	15	4	11	55	41	+14	46	Promotion to Lowland League West
6	Johnstone Burgh (P)	30	14	2	14	52	51	+1	44	Promotion to Lowland League West
7	Kilwinning Rangers (P)	30	13	4	13	61	53	+8	43	Promotion to Lowland League West
8	Arthurlie	30	13	4	13	71	64	+7	43	Ineligible for promotion
9	Hurlford United	30	14	1	15	52	55	−3	43	Ineligible for promotion
10	Renfrew (P)	30	13	3	14	56	53	+3	42	Promotion to Lowland League West
11	Beith Juniors (P)	30	12	4	14	42	48	−6	40	Promotion to Lowland League West
12	Drumchapel United	30	11	6	13	54	65	−11	39	
13	Glenafton Athletic	30	10	6	14	41	67	−26	36	
14	Shotts Bon Accord	30	8	6	16	47	53	−6	30	Ineligible for promotion
15	Rutherglen Glencairn	30	9	2	19	37	63	−26	29	
16	St Cadoc's	30	2	3	25	25	94	−69	9	

Rules for classification: 1) Points; 2) Goal difference; 3) Goals scored
(C) Champions; (P) Promoted

=== Results ===
Home \ Away	ART	AUC	BEI	CMN	DRU	GLE	HUR	JOB	KWN	LRG	PLK	REN	RUG	SBA	STC	TRO
Arthurlie		2–4	2–3	0–3	4–1	0–3	3–0	2–3	0–2	1–2	5–1	3–2	3–2	2–1	0–0	3–0
Auchinleck Talbot	1–2		1–0	0–0	2–0	7–1	1–2	1–0	1–1	1–1	4–0	5–0	2–0	3–0	7–2	1–1
Beith Juniors	1–6	0–2		2–4	1–6	0–2	1–3	2–0	0–0	2–1	1–3	0–2	4–1	1–1	4–0	5–0
Cumnock Juniors	3–2	1–3	1–0		1–1	1–1	3–0	3–0	3–2	3–1	5–0	2–2	2–4	2–1	2–0	0–1
Drumchapel United	0–6	5–3	0–1	1–4		4–2	2–4	1–0	2–8	0–2	2–2	2–1	0–0	2–2	0–2	2–3
Glenafton Athletic	3–2	2–1	3–2	0–3	1–3		1–2	0–5	1–5	0–3	0–2	1–3	2–2	1–1	2–0	1–2
Hurlford United	3–0	0–4	1–2	1–2	1–3	2–3		4–1	2–0	2–2	2–1	3–0	2–0	1–4	3–0	0–2
Johnstone Burgh	2–3	0–4	1–1	1–0	4–2	0–0	3–1		3–4	3–1	1–2	2–3	4–1	2–0	2–1	0–2
Kilwinning Rangers	3–3	2–4	1–2	0–1	4–2	5–0	3–2	0–2		1–2	3–0	2–1	1–4	2–2	5–0	0–3
Largs Thistle	5–3	1–3	2–2	1–2	0–1	5–1	1–3	1–2	3–0		1–3	1–0	0–1	2–1	6–0	1–1
Pollok	3–0	0–1	0–1	1–2	2–1	1–2	3–1	2–0	2–0	1–2		0–2	4–0	1–2	9–1	1–0
Renfrew	2–3 (Note: Match played at McKenna Park, Shieldhall.)	0–2	2–0	1–0	0–4	4–2	4–0 (Note: Match played at McKenna Park, Shieldhall.)	4–2	1–2	1–2	1–1		6–0	2–1	3–1	1–2 (Note: Match played at McKenna Park, Shieldhall, due to pitch replacement works at New Western Park.)
Rutherglen Glencairn	3–2	0–1	1–2	0–2	0–1	0–3	1–4	1–3	0–1	0–1	1–2	4–0		3–2	4–0	1–6
Shotts Bon Accord	2–3	2–4	0–2	3–1	1–2	1–1	1–0	3–1	1–0	0–2	0–1	1–1	0–2		7–2	3–4
St Cadoc's	5–5	0–2	1–0	0–1	2–2	0–1	0–2	1–3	0–3	2–3	0–3	3–6	0–1	1–3		1–2
Troon	1–1	2–5	1–0	0–1	2–2	1–1	4–1	1–2	6–1	1–0	1–0	2–1	3–0	2–1	3–0	

Legend: Blue = home team win; Yellow = draw; Red = away team win.

== First Division ==
West of Scotland Football League First Division
- Season: 2025–26
- Dates: 26 July 2025 – 16 May 2026
- Champions: Irvine Meadow
- Promoted: Ardrossan Winton Rovers; Benburb; Cumbernauld United; Darvel; Irvine Meadow; Kilbirnie Ladeside; Kirkintilloch Rob Roy; St Roch's; Vale of Clyde
- Matches: 240
- Goals: 984 (4.1 per match)
- Biggest home win: Vale of Clyde 9–0 Gartcairn (4 April 2026)
- Biggest away win: Lanark United 0–7 Irvine Meadow (9 May 2026)
- Highest scoring: Petershill 6–5 Neilston (16 May 2026)
- Longest winning run: 6 matches: 4 teams
- Longest unbeaten run: 12 matches: Irvine Meadow
- Longest winless run: 19 matches: Gartcairn
- Longest losing run: 10 matches: Lanark United
- All statistics correct as of 16 May 2026.

Irvine Meadow won the First Division title on 2 May 2026; their 4–1 win at Gartcairn coupled with a 2–2 draw for St Roch's at Kilbirnie Ladeside gave them an unassailable 13-point lead.

=== Team changes ===
Defending champions Arthurlie were promoted to the Premier Division alongside Rutherglen Glencairn, Renfrew and Kilwinning Rangers while Maybole, Blantyre Victoria and Ashfield were relegated to the Second Division. In their place, Benburb, Gartcairn and Darvel were relegated from the Premier Division and Neilston, Whitletts Victoria, Muirkirk and Lanark United were promoted from the Second Division.

=== Stadia and locations ===
Team	Location	Ground	Surface	Capacity	Seats	Floodlit	Ref.
Ardrossan Winton Rovers	Ardrossan	Winton Park	Grass	2,000	80	Yes	
Benburb ^{[SFA]}	Drumoyne, Glasgow	New Tinto Park	Artificial	1,000	0	Yes	
Cumbernauld United	Cumbernauld	Guy's Meadow	Grass	1,000	0	No	
Darvel ^{[SFA]}	Darvel	Recreation Park	Grass	2,750	60	Yes	
Gartcairn	Airdrie	MTC Park	Artificial	500	50	Yes	
Irvine Meadow ^{[SFA]}	Irvine	Meadow Park	Grass	2,132	700	Yes	
Kilbirnie Ladeside	Kilbirnie	Valefield Park	Grass	1,000	22	No	
Kirkintilloch Rob Roy ^{[SFA]}	Kirkintilloch	Kirkintilloch Community Sports Complex	Artificial	839	302	Yes	
Lanark United	Lanark	Moor Park	Grass	1,500	0	No	
Muirkirk	Muirkirk	Burnside Park	Grass	1,600	0	No	
Neilston	Neilston	Brig O' Lea Stadium	Grass	1,000	0	Yes	
Petershill	Springburn, Glasgow	Petershill Park	Artificial	1,500	500	Yes	
St Roch's	Provanmill, Glasgow	James McGrory Park	Grass	2,000	0	No	
Thorniewood United	Viewpark	Robertson Park	Grass	1,000	0	No	
Vale of Clyde	Tollcross, Glasgow	Fullarton Park	Grass	1,500	0	No	
Whitletts Victoria	Ayr	New Voluntary Park	Artificial	500	0	Yes	

2025–26 West of Scotland Football League First Division
Team locations:
1 Ardrossan Winton Rovers
2 Benburb
3 Cumbernauld United
4 Darvel
5 Gartcairn
6 Irvine Meadow
7 Kilbirnie Ladeside
8 Kirkintilloch Rob Roy
9 Lanark United
10 Muirkirk
11 Neilston
12 Thorniewood United
13 Petershill
14 St Roch's
15 Vale of Clyde
16 Whitletts Victoria

=== League table ===
Pos	Team	Pld	W	D	L	GF	GA	GD	Pts	Promotion or relegation
1	Irvine Meadow (C, P)	30	24	4	2	84	32	+52	76	Promotion to the Premier Division
2	St Roch's (P)	30	18	3	9	63	44	+19	57	Promotion to the Premier Division
3	Vale of Clyde (P)	30	16	4	10	74	48	+26	52	Promotion to the Premier Division
4	Ardrossan Winton Rovers (P)	30	15	4	11	71	60	+11	49	Promotion to the Premier Division
5	Muirkirk	30	14	5	11	72	55	+17	47	Entered abeyance at the end of the season
6	Kirkintilloch Rob Roy (P)	30	13	8	9	54	44	+10	47	Promotion to the Premier Division
7	Kilbirnie Ladeside (P)	30	13	7	10	61	54	+7	46	Promotion to the Premier Division
8	Cumbernauld United (P)	30	13	6	11	60	52	+8	45	Promotion to the Premier Division
9	Darvel (P)	30	12	7	11	65	64	+1	43	Promotion to the Premier Division
10	Benburb (P)	30	10	7	13	56	59	−3	37	Promotion to the Premier Division
11	Petershill	30	10	5	15	63	80	−17	35	
12	Whitletts Victoria	30	8	7	15	53	68	−15	31	
13	Neilston	30	10	1	19	68	87	−19	31	
14	Thorniewood United	30	9	3	18	60	80	−20	30	
15	Gartcairn	30	8	6	16	52	80	−28	30	
16	Lanark United	30	6	5	19	32	81	−49	23	

Rules for classification: 1) Points; 2) Goal difference; 3) Goals scored
(C) Champions; (P) Promoted

=== Results ===
Home \ Away	AWR	BEN	CMU	DAR	GAR	IVM	KLB	KRR	LAN	MUI	NEI	PET	STR	THU	VOC	WHV
Ardrossan Winton Rovers		4–2	2–3	0–6	5–1	3–2	0–1	1–5	3–3	2–2	3–2	3–2	0–3	4–1	3–0	3–3
Benburb	0–1		1–0	1–1	4–1	1–1	1–1	0–2	3–1	0–2	4–4	3–4	0–3	2–2	2–4	6–1
Cumbernauld United	1–0	0–2		3–2	4–0	0–0	2–2	1–1	2–0	0–2	3–0	3–1	3–4	6–4	3–0	3–0
Darvel	5–4	2–1	2–2		0–2	1–4	0–0	0–1	4–2	1–1	5–2	3–1	2–2	2–5	1–0	1–1
Gartcairn	1–6	0–1	3–0	1–4		1–4	4–1	1–3	1–1	3–4	3–0	3–4	0–2	2–0	2–2	3–1
Irvine Meadow	1–2	4–0	1–0	4–1	2–0		4–3	5–0	3–0	4–2	5–3	2–1	1–0	3–1	2–1	2–1
Kilbirnie Ladeside	0–3	4–3	4–0	2–3	1–1	3–3		0–2	0–2	2–1	1–0	2–0	2–2	2–3	3–1	3–3
Kirkintilloch Rob Roy	4–1	3–0	4–1	1–2	1–2	1–1	0–2		1–0	0–0	4–1	3–1	0–3	1–1	2–2	2–3
Lanark United	0–4	0–4	3–1	3–3	0–6	0–7	1–2	0–0		0–6	3–1	0–2	0–1	1–0	0–1	2–1
Muirkirk	2–2	2–3	4–2	1–0	7–1	0–2	2–3	3–5	5–1		1–2	3–0	1–4	3–1	2–1	0–2
Neilston	3–1	3–4	1–4	1–2	2–1	2–4	2–4	4–2	5–0	6–1		4–3	4–1	4–3	0–6	0–3
Petershill	0–4	3–4	3–3	4–1	1–1	1–4	0–4	1–1	3–3	1–3	6–5		3–2	5–4	2–1	1–1
St Roch's	0–1	1–1	2–1	5–2	3–0	1–2	1–6	2–0	3–1	2–6	3–1	5–2		1–0	2–1	3–1
Thorniewood United	1–2	3–2	1–4	2–4	4–4	1–3	3–2	1–2	4–2	1–3	3–1	3–2	1–0		0–3	1–2
Vale of Clyde	4–3	2–1	1–1	4–3	9–0	1–2	4–0	2–2	4–0	2–1	2–1	2–4	2–0	6–2		3–2
Whitletts Victoria	2–1	0–0	2–4	4–2	4–4	1–2	3–1	3–1	1–3	2–2	2–4	0–2	0–2	2–4	2–3	

Legend: Blue = home team win; Yellow = draw; Red = away team win.

== Second Division ==
West of Scotland Football League Second Division
- Season: 2025–26
- Dates: 26 July 2025 – 16 May 2026
- Champions: Bellshill Athletic
- Promoted: Bellshill Athletic; Blantyre Victoria; Bonnyton Thistle; Cambuslang Rangers; Kilsyth Rangers; Lesmahagow; Maryhill; Maybole; Thorn Athletic; Threave Rovers
- Matches: 240
- Goals: 987 (4.11 per match)
- Biggest home win: Kilsyth Rangers 10–1 Maybole (13 December 2025)
- Biggest away win: Ashfield 0–8 Maryhill (9 August 2025)
- Highest scoring: Kilsyth Rangers 10–1 Maybole (13 December 2025)
- Longest winning run: 10 matches: Bellshill Athletic
- Longest unbeaten run: 15 matches: Threave Rovers
- Longest winless run: 11 matches: Forth Wanderers
- Longest losing run: 10 matches: Caledonian Locomotives & Forth Wanderers
- All statistics correct as of 16 May 2026.

Bellshill Athletic won the Second Division title on 2 May 2026, with an 8–0 win over Forth Wanderers to maintain an 11-point lead over Threave Rovers, who had three games remaining at the time.

=== Team changes ===
Defending champions Neilston were promoted to the First Division alongside Whitletts Victoria, Muirkirk and Lanark United while Yoker Athletic, St Anthony's and Craigmark Burntonians were relegated to the Third Division. In their place, Maybole, Blantyre Victoria and Ashfield were relegated from the First Division and Thorn Athletic, Kilsyth Athletic, Threave Rovers and Greenock were promoted from the Third Division.

=== Stadia and locations ===
Team	Location	Ground	Surface	Capacity	Seats	Floodlit	Ref
Ashfield	Easterhouse, Glasgow	Stepford Football Centre (Note: Ashfield are ground-sharing with Easterhouse Academy at Stepford Football Centre.)	Artificial	500	0	Yes	
Bellshill Athletic	Bellshill	Rockburn Park	Grass	1,400	0	No	
Blantyre Victoria	Blantyre	Castle Park	Grass	1,500	60	No	
Bonnyton Thistle ^{[SFA]}	Kilmarnock	Townholm Arena	Artificial	500	0	Yes	
Caledonian Locomotives	Springburn, Glasgow	Petershill Park (Note: Caledonian Locomotives are ground-sharing with Petershill at Petershill Park.)	Artificial	1,500	500	Yes	
Cambuslang Rangers	Cambuslang	Somervell Park	Grass	2,000	0	No	
Forth Wanderers	Forth	Kingshill Park	Grass	1,000	0	No	
Greenock	Greenock	Ravenscraig Stadium	Grass	650	650	Yes	
Kilsyth Athletic	Kilsyth	Kilsyth Sports Field	Artificial	300	0	No	
Kilsyth Rangers	Kilsyth	Duncansfield	Grass	1,500	0	No	
Larkhall Thistle	Larkhall	Gasworks Park	Grass	1,500	0	No	
Lesmahagow	Lesmahagow	Craighead Park	Grass	2,000	0	No	
Maryhill	Maryhill, Glasgow	Lochburn Park	Grass	1,800	205	Yes	
Maybole	Maybole	Ladywell Stadium	Grass	1,000	124	No	
Thorn Athletic	Johnstone	Thorn Athletic Sports Academy	Grass	500	0	No	
Threave Rovers ^{[SFA]}	Castle Douglas	Meadow Park	Grass	1,500	100	Yes	

Notes

2025–26 West of Scotland Football League Second Division
Team locations:
1 Ashfield
2 Bellshill Athletic
3 Blantyre Victoria
4 Bonnyton Thistle
5 Caledonian Locomotives
6 Cambuslang Rangers
7 Forth Wanderers
8 Greenock
9 Kilsyth Athletic
10 Kilsyth Rangers
11 Larkhall Thistle
12 Lesmahagow
13 Maryhill
14 Maybole
15 Thorn Athletic
16 Threave Rovers

=== League table ===
Pos	Team	Pld	W	D	L	GF	GA	GD	Pts	Promotion or relegation
1	Bellshill Athletic (C, P)	30	25	2	3	94	35	+59	77	Promotion to the First Division
2	Threave Rovers (P)	30	21	5	4	99	36	+63	68	Promotion to the First Division
3	Bonnyton Thistle (P)	30	16	7	7	68	48	+20	55	Promotion to the First Division
4	Blantyre Victoria (P)	30	16	6	8	64	40	+24	54	Promotion to the First Division
5	Maryhill (P)	30	15	6	9	77	54	+23	51	Promotion to the First Division
6	Lesmahagow (P)	30	14	8	8	66	54	+12	50	Promotion to the First Division
7	Kilsyth Rangers (P)	30	14	6	10	66	46	+20	48	Promotion to the First Division
8	Thorn Athletic (P)	30	12	6	12	61	58	+3	42	Promotion to the First Division
9	Cambuslang Rangers (P)	30	13	3	14	61	63	−2	42	Promotion to the First Division
10	Maybole (P)	30	12	5	13	53	70	−17	41	Promotion to the First Division
11	Greenock	30	12	2	16	65	66	−1	38	
12	Larkhall Thistle	30	11	5	14	44	57	−13	38	
13	Ashfield	30	10	0	20	52	75	−23	30	
14	Caledonian Locomotives	30	6	3	21	43	83	−40	21	Folded at the end of the season
15	Kilsyth Athletic	30	6	3	21	43	85	−42	21	
16	Forth Wanderers	30	2	3	25	31	117	−86	9	

Rules for classification: 1) Points; 2) Goal difference; 3) Goals scored
(C) Champions; (P) Promoted

=== Results ===
Home \ Away	ASH	BEL	BLV	BON	CAL	CAM	FOR	GRE	KAT	KRA	LAR	LES	MAR	MAY	THO	THR
Ashfield		2–3	1–7	1–2	4–2	2–1	0–2	0–3	3–2	3–1	1–3	1–3	0–8	3–1	1–3	3–2
Bellshill Athletic	2–1		2–1	1–2	5–1	3–2	8–0	3–1	4–0	4–0	2–1	1–1	3–1	5–1	2–0	2–0
Blantyre Victoria	2–1	2–3		0–1	3–2	4–3	6–0	2–0	1–1	0–2	1–3	2–4	2–1	1–0	1–0	1–1
Bonnyton Thistle	2–1	2–4	4–1		1–1	1–2	8–1	5–3	4–1	3–1	3–2	3–1	2–4	2–2	0–2	0–3
Caledonian Locomotives	3–1	3–5	2–2	1–3		0–4	2–5	1–2	0–1	2–3	3–4 (Note: Match played at James McGrory Park, Provanmill.)	3–6	1–3	0–1	1–0	2–6
Cambuslang Rangers	2–1	3–4	1–3	5–1	1–1		2–0	1–7	4–1	4–2	1–2	1–2	0–1	3–4	3–2	1–1
Forth Wanderers	1–4	0–5	3–4	2–2	1–3	0–3		2–4	0–5	0–4	0–2	1–3	0–5	2–2	1–2	0–4
Greenock	1–3	1–4	0–4	1–1	3–1	0–1	6–2		4–0	0–1	4–1	0–3	1–1	3–0	1–3	2–3
Kilsyth Athletic	3–2	1–4	0–2	2–3	0–2	3–4	3–2	1–2		2–1	1–2	0–2	2–3	2–2	0–3	1–6
Kilsyth Rangers	3–1	1–1	1–1	0–0	1–2	5–1	4–3	3–2	6–1		1–1	0–0	1–3	10–1	3–0	1–3
Larkhall Thistle	0–2	1–4	1–0	1–1	1–0	1–2	2–0	1–3	3–3	0–1		1–1	3–0	1–1	1–3	0–2
Lesmahagow	2–0	1–2	0–3	0–4	5–2	2–3	2–2	4–2	1–0	2–4	2–0		0–3	3–3	3–3	3–5
Maryhill	2–1	3–1	0–2	2–3	6–0	2–2	6–0	1–5	4–3	1–1	5–3	0–3		3–0	4–4	1–4
Maybole	3–1	1–2	0–3	0–4	2–0	2–1	5–0	4–1	3–0	2–1	2–3	0–2	4–1		2–0	0–4
Thorn Athletic	2–6 (Note: Match played at Winton Park, Ardrossan.)	0–4	1–1	1–1	1–2	2–0	6–1	4–2	3–4	3–1	3–0	3–3	1–1	2–3		2–1
Threave Rovers	4–2	2–1	2–2	2–0	3–0	4–0	5–0	6–1	5–0	0–3	5–0	2–2	2–2	7–2	5–2	

Legend: Blue = home team win; Yellow = draw; Red = away team win.

== Third Division ==
West of Scotland Football League Third Division
- Season: 2025–26
- Dates: 26 July 2025 – 16 May 2026
- Champions: Craigmark Burntonians
- Promoted: Ardeer Thistle; Craigmark Burntonians; Dalry Thistle; Easterhouse Academy; Finnart; Girvan; Glasgow United; Glasgow University; Knightswood; Port Glasgow; Yoker Athletic
- Matches: 240
- Goals: 995 (4.15 per match)
- Biggest home win: Knightswood 9–0 Glasgow Perthshire (21 February 2026)
- Biggest away win: St Anthony's 0–8 Glasgow University (28 February 2026)
- Highest scoring: Glenvale 6–6 Lugar Boswell Thistle (10 January 2026)
- Longest winning run: 10 matches: Craigmark Burntonians
- Longest unbeaten run: 11 matches: Craigmark Burntonians & Port Glasgow
- Longest winless run: 11 matches: 3 teams
- Longest losing run: 11 matches: Glasgow Perthshire
- All statistics correct as of 16 May 2026.

Craigmark Burntonians won the Third Division title on the final day of the season; having entered with a three-point lead over Knightswood, a 1–1 draw for Craigmark Burntonians against Easterhouse Academy was enough for the title irrespective of Knightswood's 5–1 win over Glasgow United.

=== Team changes ===
Defending champions Thorn Athletic were promoted to the Second Division alongside Kilsyth Athletic, Threave Rovers and Greenock while Vale of Leven, Irvine Victoria and Wishaw were relegated to the Fourth Division. In their place, Yoker Athletic, St Anthony's and Craigmark Burntonians were relegated from the Second Division and Knightswood, Port Glasgow, Kello Rovers and Easterhouse Academy were promoted from the Fourth Division.

=== Stadia and locations ===
Team	Location	Ground	Surface	Capacity	Seats	Floodlit	Ref.
Ardeer Thistle	Stevenston	Ardeer Stadium	Grass	1,500	0	No	
Craigmark Burntonians	Dalmellington	Station Park	Grass	1,500	0	No	
Dalry Thistle	Dalry	Merksworth Park	Grass	1,500	0	No	
Easterhouse Academy	Easterhouse, Glasgow	Stepford Football Centre	Artificial	500	0	Yes	
Finnart	Springburn, Glasgow	Springburn Park	Artificial	500	0	Yes	
Girvan ^{[SFA]}	Girvan	Hamilton Park	Grass	2,000	200	No	
Glasgow Perthshire	Possilpark, Glasgow	Keppoch Park	Grass	1,500	90	No	
Glasgow United	Shettleston, Glasgow	Greenfield Park	Grass	1,800	10	No	
Glasgow University ^{[SFA]}	Airdrie	Excelsior Stadium	Artificial	10,101	10,101	Yes	
Glenvale	Paisley	Ferguslie Sports Centre	Artificial	500	0	Yes	
Kello Rovers	Kirkconnel	Nithsdale Park	Grass	1,700	0	No	
Knightswood	Kirkintilloch	Kirkintilloch Community Sports Complex (Note: Knightswood are ground-sharing with Kirkintilloch Rob Roy at Kirkintilloch Community Sports Complex.)	Artificial	839	302	Yes	
Lugar Boswell Thistle	Lugar	Rosebank Park	Grass	1,500	0	No	
Port Glasgow	Port Glasgow	Parklea Community Stadium	Artificial	1,500	0	Yes	
St Anthony's	Shieldhall, Glasgow	McKenna Park	Grass	1,000	0	No	
Yoker Athletic	Clydebank	Holm Park	Artificial	1,200	0	Yes	

Notes

2025–26 West of Scotland Football League Third Division
Team locations:
1 Ardeer Thistle
2 Craigmark Burntonians
3 Dalry Thistle
4 Easterhouse
5 Finnart
6 Girvan
7 Glasgow Perthshire
8 Glasgow United
9 Glasgow University
10 Glenvale
11 Kello Rovers
12 Knightswood
13 Lugar Boswell Thistle
14 Port Glasgow
15 St Anthony's
16 Yoker Athletic

=== League table ===
Pos	Team	Pld	W	D	L	GF	GA	GD	Pts	Promotion or relegation
1	Craigmark Burntonians (C, P)	30	21	5	4	72	32	+40	68	Promotion to the Second Division
2	Knightswood (P)	30	21	4	5	88	30	+58	67	Promotion to the Second Division
3	Port Glasgow (P)	30	19	6	5	86	48	+38	63	Promotion to the Second Division
4	Glasgow University (P)	30	18	2	10	88	60	+28	56	Promotion to the Second Division
5	Yoker Athletic (P)	30	16	5	9	71	48	+23	53	Promotion to the Second Division
6	Dalry Thistle (P)	30	15	4	11	71	58	+13	49	Promotion to the Second Division
7	Easterhouse Academy (P)	30	14	4	12	75	59	+16	46	Promotion to the Second Division
8	Ardeer Thistle (P)	30	14	4	12	71	68	+3	46	Promotion to the Second Division
9	Finnart (P)	30	11	8	11	59	56	+3	41	Promotion to the Second Division
10	Glasgow United (P)	30	13	1	16	67	65	+2	40	Promotion to the Second Division
11	Girvan (P)	30	9	8	13	47	47	0	35	Promotion to the Second Division
12	Glenvale	30	10	5	15	62	74	−12	35	
13	Kello Rovers	30	9	5	16	37	58	−21	32	
14	Lugar Boswell Thistle	30	4	6	20	42	95	−53	18	
15	St Anthony's	30	5	3	22	30	97	−67	18	
16	Glasgow Perthshire	30	4	4	22	29	100	−71	16	

Rules for classification: 1) Points; 2) Goal difference; 3) Goals scored
(C) Champions; (P) Promoted

=== Results ===
Home \ Away	ARD	CRG	DAL	EAS	FIN	GIR	GLP	GLA	GLU	GLE	KEL	KNI	LBT	PGL	STA	YOK
Ardeer Thistle		2–3	4–3	2–4	2–2	1–0	4–1	3–1	1–4	1–3	3–0	4–2	2–3	4–0	4–2	3–2
Craigmark Burntonians	3–1		1–2	1–1	2–1	1–2	2–2 (Note: Match played at Townhead Park, Cumnock.)	2–0	3–2	4–0	2–1	0–0	4–1	2–2	2–2	3–2
Dalry Thistle	1–0	0–2		2–4	1–4 (Note: Match played at Winton Park, Ardrossan.)	1–1	3–1	2–1	1–3	3–2	3–1	1–1	1–0 (Note: Match played at Winton Park, Ardrossan, due to pitch maintenance at Merksworth Park.)	4–3	6–1	2–2
Easterhouse Academy	1–0	4–1	6–1		2–4	4–0	2–1	2–3	4–2	2–2	3–0	1–3	4–1	2–3	1–0	4–1
Finnart	1–2 (Note: Match played at Greenfield Park, Shettleston.)	0–2	1–2	2–0		3–2	2–0	1–4 (Note: Match played at Greenfield Park, Shettleston.)	0–1 (Note: Match played at Greenfield Park, Shettleston.)	4–2 (Note: Match played at Greenfield Park, Shettleston.)	2–0	1–4	4–0	2–2	1–1	2–6 (Note: Match played at Greenfield Park, Shettleston.)
Girvan	4–2	1–2	1–1	4–1	3–1		2–2	1–2	1–3	1–1	0–0	0–1	2–2	1–1	1–2	1–2
Glasgow Perthshire	3–1	1–5	0–5	2–5	0–1	1–5		1–5	0–5	1–5	1–2	2–2	0–0	1–6	2–1	0–1
Glasgow United	1–1	0–1	3–4	4–2	2–3	0–4	1–2		3–5	5–1	2–0	5–1	3–4	3–0	5–2	0–4
Glasgow University	5–1	2–4	1–8	3–1	2–1	2–2	6–0	3–1		2–1	0–2	1–2	6–0	0–2	3–0	1–1
Glenvale	1–3	0–2	3–2	4–3	2–2	1–2	3–1	2–1	4–6		2–1	0–1	6–6	1–4	3–1	4–2
Kello Rovers	2–4	0–1	0–6	1–1	2–2	1–0	2–1	2–4	4–2	2–1		0–1	3–1 (Note: Match played at Loch Park, New Cumnock.)	0–1	2–3	1–1
Knightswood	5–1	0–2	3–1	3–1	2–2	3–0	9–0	5–1	3–0	3–0	4–0		7–0	6–1 (Note: Match played at New Tinto Park, Drumoyne.)	7–1	2–1
Lugar Boswell Thistle	3–3	1–6	1–2	0–6	2–2	0–2	1–2	2–4	2–4	2–2	2–4	0–2		2–6	2–0	1–3
Port Glasgow	4–4	1–0	3–2	4–1	2–2	3–1	6–0	2–1	6–1	3–1	1–1	2–1	0–3		8–1	5–0
St Anthony's	1–4	0–6	2–1	1–3	0–3	0–3	2–0	1–2	0–8	2–5	0–3	0–5	2–0	1–3		0–3
Yoker Athletic	3–4	1–3	3–0	2–2	4–3	3–0	6–1	2–0	4–3	2–0	4–0	2–0	3–0	0–2	1–1	

Legend: Blue = home team win; Yellow = draw; Red = away team win.

== Fourth Division ==
West of Scotland Football League Fourth Division
- Season: 2025–26
- Dates: 26 July 2025 – 16 May 2026
- Champions: East Kilbride YM
- Promoted: Carluke Rovers; East Kilbride Thistle; East Kilbride YM; Eglinton; Giffnock; Irvine Victoria; Newmains United; Royal Albert; Saltcoats Victoria; Vale of Leven; West Park United
- Matches: 210 (Note: 24 matches and 81 goals were expunged from the overall tallies, following BSC Glasgow's withdrawal from the league.)
- Goals: 870 (4.14 per match)
- Biggest home win: Royal Albert 10–0 Campbeltown Pupils (11 April 2026)
- Biggest away win: Campbeltown Pupils 0–10 East Kilbride Thistle (16 May 2026)
- Highest scoring: Carluke Rovers 10–4 Wishaw (16 May 2026)
- Longest winning run: 8 matches: West Park United (Note: One win against BSC Glasgow expunged.)
- Longest unbeaten run: 21 matches: East Kilbride YM
- Longest winless run: 26 matches: Campbeltown Pupils (Note: Two losses against BSC Glasgow expunged.)
- Longest losing run: 14 matches: Campbeltown Pupils
- All statistics correct as of 16 May 2026.

In their first season as part of the West of Scotland Football League, East Kilbride YM won the Fourth Division title by three points ahead of Royal Albert, with the two teams playing out a 2–2 draw on the final day.

=== Team changes ===
Defending champions Knightswood were promoted to the Third Division alongside Port Glasgow, Kello Rovers and Easterhouse Academy. In their place, Vale of Leven, Irvine Victoria and Wishaw were relegated from the Third Division East Kilbride YM joined the West of Scotland League from the amateur Caledonian Premier Division.

=== Stadia and locations ===
Team	Location	Ground	Surface	Capacity	Seats	Floodlit	Ref.
BSC Glasgow	Yoker, Glasgow	Peterson Park	Grass	500	0	No	
Campbeltown Pupils	Campbeltown	Kintyre Park	Grass	1,500	0	No	
Carluke Rovers ^{[SFA]}	Carluke	John Cumming Stadium	Artificial	1,500	0	Yes	
East Kilbride Thistle	East Kilbride	The Showpark	Grass	1,500	0	No	
East Kilbride YM	East Kilbride	Kirktonholme Recreation Ground	Artificial	500	0	No	
Eglinton	Kilwinning	Kilwinning Community Sports Club	Artificial	500	0	Yes	
Giffnock SC	Giffnock	GSC Auldhouse	Artificial	500	0	Yes	
Irvine Victoria	Irvine	Victoria Park	Grass	1,000	0	No	
Newmains United	Newmains	Victoria Park	Grass	1,000	0	No	
Rossvale	Bishopbriggs	Hunterhill Sports Hub	Artificial	500	0	Yes	
Royal Albert	Stonehouse	Tileworks Park	Grass	1,000	0	No	
Saltcoats Victoria	Saltcoats	Campbell Park	Grass	1,500	0	No	
St. Peter's	Renfrew	New Western Park (Note: St. Peter's are ground-sharing with Renfrew at New Western Park.)	Artificial	1,000	0	Yes	
Vale of Leven	Alexandria	Millburn Park	Grass	2,000	0	No	
West Park United	Bishopbriggs	Huntershill Sports Hub	Artificial	1,000	0	Yes	
Wishaw	Wishaw	Beltane Park	Grass	1,000	0	No	

Notes

2025–26 West of Scotland Football League Fourth Division
Team locations:
1 BSC Glasgow
2 Campbeltown Pupils
3 Carluke Rovers
4 East Kilbride Thistle
5 East Kilbride YM
6 Eglinton
7 Giffnock
8 Irvine Victoria
9 Newmains United
10 Rossvale
11 Royal Albert
12 Saltcoats Victoria
13 St. Peter's
14 Vale of Leven
15 West Park United
16 Wishaw

=== League table ===
On 31 March 2026, BSC Glasgow resigned as a member of the league, and their results were expunged.

Pos	Team	Pld	W	D	L	GF	GA	GD	Pts	Promotion or qualification
1	East Kilbride YM (C, P)	28	19	6	3	93	35	+58	63	Promotion to the Third Division
2	Royal Albert (P)	28	17	9	2	72	29	+43	60	Promotion to the Third Division
3	Carluke Rovers (P)	28	18	2	8	74	45	+29	56	Promotion to the Third Division
4	West Park United (P)	28	17	4	7	70	40	+30	55	Promotion to the Third Division
5	East Kilbride Thistle (P)	28	17	3	8	86	50	+36	54	Promotion to the Third Division
6	Vale of Leven (P)	28	15	5	8	69	42	+27	50	Promotion to the Third Division
7	Eglinton (P)	28	13	7	8	54	44	+10	46	Promotion to the Third Division
8	Irvine Victoria (P)	28	13	4	11	68	61	+7	43	Promotion to the Third Division
9	Giffnock (P)	28	12	4	12	58	53	+5	40	Promotion to the Third Division
10	St. Peter's	28	10	6	12	54	56	−2	36	Resigned at the end of the season
11	Newmains United (P)	28	8	5	15	42	53	−11	29	Promotion to the Third Division
12	Saltcoats Victoria (P)	28	8	3	17	41	68	−27	27	Promotion to the Third Division
13	Wishaw	28	6	5	17	40	79	−39	23	
14	Rossvale	28	2	4	22	32	86	−54	10	
15	Campbeltown Pupils	28	1	1	26	17	129	−112	4	
16	BSC Glasgow	0	0	0	0	0	0	0	0	Resigned; record expunged

Rules for classification: 1) Points; 2) Goal difference; 3) Goals scored
(C) Champions; (P) Promoted

=== Results ===
On 31 March 2026, BSC Glasgow resigned as a member of the league, and their results were expunged.

Home \ Away	BSC	CAM	CAR	EKT	EKY	EGL	GSC	IVV	NUC	ROS	ROA	SAL	STP	VOL	WPU	WSH
BSC Glasgow																
Campbeltown Pupils			1–8	0–10	2–5	1–5	1–1	1–4	1–0	0–2	1–3	1–4	1–3	0–2	2–3	0–1
Carluke Rovers		6–0		1–2	4–1	2–1 (Note: Match played at New Tinto Park, Drumoyne, due to refurbishment at the John Cumming Stadium.)	3–0 (Note: Match played at Cliftonhill, Coatbridge, due to refurbishment at the John Cumming Stadium.)	3–2	2–0	1–0	0–3	5–1	2–1	4–1	0–5 (Note: Match played at Cliftonhill, Coatbridge, due to refurbishment at the John Cumming Stadium.)	10–4
East Kilbride Thistle		7–2	1–1		2–3	6–3	3–2	1–2	4–1	5–1	1–3	3–4	1–0	6–3	2–1	1–1
East Kilbride YM		8–0	2–0	3–3		5–0	1–1	1–3	2–0	3–1	2–2	4–0	2–1	1–1	3–3	7–0
Eglinton		3–0	0–1	2–4	2–4		4–3	0–0	2–1	2–1	1–1	0–0	1–0	1–2	2–1	4–2
Giffnock		6–0	1–2	2–4	3–5	1–0		1–0	1–3	4–1	1–1	2–1	1–4	2–1	5–0	3–0
Irvine Victoria		4–1	3–1	0–1	1–6	3–4	6–3		2–1	4–1	2–6	1–2	2–2	4–3	2–4	3–2
Newmains United		5–0	1–3	4–1	1–5	0–0	0–2	3–4		4–2	2–2	1–1	0–0	4–3	1–0	5–2
Rossvale		4–1	1–4	1–4	0–5	0–2	1–3	3–3	1–1		2–3	1–4	0–3	1–1	0–5 (Note: Match played at McKenna Park, Shieldhall.)	2–7
Royal Albert		10–0	3–1	3–1	2–2	0–0	5–1	2–2	2–1	6–1		3–0	1–1	2–1	0–1	4–0
Saltcoats Victoria		4–0 (Note: Match played at Winton Park, Ardrossan, due to water damage at Campbell Park.)	2–1	0–5 (Note: Match played at Valefield Park, Kilbirnie.)	0–2	1–4 (Note: Match played at Barrfields, Largs.)	0–3 (Note: Match played at Winton Park, Ardrossan, due to water damage at Campbell Park.)	2–6 (Note: Match played at Valefield Park, Kilbirnie.)	0–1	2–2 (Note: Match played at Winton Park, Ardrossan.)	0–1		1–3	2–6 (Note: Match played at Winton Park, Ardrossan, due to water damage at Campbell Park.)	0–2 (Note: Match played at Winton Park, Ardrossan, due to water damage at Campbell Park.)	5–1
St. Peter's		4–0	3–6	1–2 (Note: Match played at Barrfields, Largs.)	0–5	0–5	2–2	1–3 (Note: Match played at Barrfields, Largs.)	3–1	3–2	0–1	4–1		0–3	4–4	5–1
Vale of Leven		8–0	4–0	3–1	2–1	1–1	1–0	2–0	2–0	2–1	3–0	4–0	3–3		4–5	1–0
West Park United		4–0	1–2	2–0	1–2	3–3	3–1	2–1	5–1	2–0	1–2	2–0	4–0	2–1		2–0
Wishaw		5–1	1–1	1–5	0–3	1–2	1–3	2–1	1–0	2–0	1–1	0–4	1–3	1–1	2–2	

Legend: Blue = home team win; Yellow = draw; Red = away team win.

== Notes ==
^{SFA} Club with an SFA licence eligible for promotion to Lowland League West (should they participate in the Premier Division) and also compete in the Scottish Cup.
