= East Kilbride YM F.C. =

Association football club in Scotland

- Nicknames: The YM, EKYM
- Founded: 1921; 105 years ago
- Ground: Kirktonholme; East Kilbride; Scotland
- Coordinates: 55°45′59″N 4°10′59″W
- Chairman: Graeme Robertson SNR
- Manager: Graeme Robertson SNR
- League: West of Scotland League Third Division
- 2025–26: West of Scotland League Fourth Division, 1st of 16 (promoted)
- Website: https://www.pitchero.com/clubs/eastkilbrideym

East Kilbride YM Football Club (also known as The YM) are the oldest club based in East Kilbride, South Lanarkshire. The club currently have seven adult teams competing in the Caledonian, Greater Glasgow Leagues and Central Scottish Over 35s as well as a Saturday Morning Team playing in the Saturday Morning Amateur Football Association, an under 21's side, an under 19's side and an old crocks walking team. 'The YM' is part of the EK United Community Club alongside East Kilbride YC and East Kilbride Girls. The club hosts an annual Player of the Year and speakers' night and an annual invitational tournament.

== History ==
=== Formation and early years ===
East Kilbride YM were formed in 1921 with one of the earliest Team Managers being John Cadzow. The club was kept going through the war by enlisting local players and serviceman stationed nearby. In 1947 Angus McConnell became involved as Secretary and Organiser at only 16-years old. Although he never played for the club, McConnell served as secretary for many years and organised fundraising for local and national charities. At the Annual EKYM Speakers Dinner, McConnell was named Honorary President.

Despite there being no official league, East Kilbride YM kept playing throughout the war and then into the 1950s when they were accepted into the Scottish Amateur Football League. John Cadzow is widely credited with the establishment of East Kilbride YM as a club and sustaining it through its difficult early stages.

In the early 1950s, Jack Fowler became manager and remained in charge for around a decade. Les Goodfellow and Eric Gunning, both aged 17, joined the club during this period and progressed to the first team, where they played for many years. After retiring, the pair became actively involved in the running of the club until 2012, almost 60 years later.

The early-1960s saw the club add under-16 and under-18 squads bringing with them a steady stream of talented youth players. In 1961 the men's team reached the final of the Coronation Cup against Clyde Paper. After Alistair McCartney suffered a broken leg, the team played the rest of the match with ten men and won 3–2.

In 1980 Bobby Jarvie managed the East Kilbride YM under-18s to the final of the Scottish Amateur Youth Cup. They were ultimately beaten 2–1 with two late goals from Andy Walker, who would go on to play for Newcastle United and Bolton Wanderers, and his brother.

=== Recent Years ===
==== Caledonian League Team ====
The Caledonian League Team won promotion to the First Division (later renamed the Premier Division) in the 1995–96 season where they stayed until 2005, when after a poor season, were relegated down into the new First Division (formerly the Second Division). John McCole returned to manage the team after the relegation and came close to promotion on two occasions but narrowly missed out. McCole retired from management in 2011, a year after winning the East Kilbride YM Annual Tournament. Graeme Robertson and assistant Billy Hamilton, were put in charge of the Caley Team following their double winning season with the SAFL team. Since Robertson's appointment the ageing team were slowly replaced with younger players from EKYC and other youth teams in the town. In the 2012–13 season the team reached the latter stages of the West of Scotland Cup before losing to the eventual winners, Hurlford Thistle.

On 3 June 2015, The Caledonian Team reached the Final of the Caledonian AFA Presidents Cup Final, beating Hamilton FP 1–0 with Connor McCann scoring the winning goal. This was the first trophy the Caledonian Team had won in 17 years.

In August 2015, Scott Chaplain was announced as the team's new player/coach after retiring from Senior football due to his new job within the SFA.

During Season 2015-2016 the team were knocked out of the Scottish Cup on penalties by the eventual finalists Leven in the last 16 of the Competition.

In the 2016–17 season the team finished two points short of promotion and reached a semi-final and a quarter-final in league cup competitions.

In the 2018–19 season the team won the league title without losing a league match, gaining promotion.

The squad was strengthened with the additions of former Albion Rovers player Barry Russell and former Stranraer forward Sean Winter.

In 2024–25 the team won the Caledonian Premier League for the first time and reached the West of Scotland Cup final, losing on penalties to St Patrick's AFC.

==== Scottish Amateur Team ====
In 1996, East Kilbride YM were accepted into the Caledonian League, after winning the Scottish Amateur Premier League Cup under the charges of John McClymont and Peter Allan. The YM elected to enter a new team into the SAFL and were made to start again at the bottom of the league system. The Scottish Amateur team became a feeder for the Caley team and competed in the Scottish Amateur 2nd Division until 2003 when they won the league.

Having been relegated in previous seasons, the Scottish Amateur team found themselves back in the Second Division at the start of 2010–11. The appointment of Graeme Robertson and Billy Hamilton saw the most successful season for the team since their inclusion in the SAFL for a second time. The team went unbeaten in the league until 2011 and progressed to the Hall Cup Final to face Aitkenhead Thistle AFC in April 2011.Within two weeks, the team secured both the league title and the Hall Cup.

After Robertsons move to the Caley side, Gary Lawson took over as manager before work commitments forced him to hand over the reins to Andy Dykes, previously a coach with the Caley side, for the 2013–14 Season.

Tam Barclay and Stephen McKenna took over in June 2014 as a second group of under-19 players moved up to the adult side.

The Scottish Amateur Team made the decision to leave the league and merge with the Greater Glasgow Team.

==== Greater Glasgow Team ====
The Greater Glasgow Premier League side was created for the 2012–13 season. Marshalled by Colin Dailly in its inaugural season, it was a difficult season with a poor showing in the league.

With the first wave of under-19's moving to the adult side since the inception of the EKYMC Community Club, Gordon McCulloch followed his players into the management position.

The team made a strong start to the league season and reached the final of the Greater Glasgow Premier League Cup, where they lost 4–3 to Broomhouse, who had won their league in 2013–14. In season 2016-17 Graeme Ronbertson JNR (former league and cup winner with the SAFL team) took charge from Gordon McCulloch. An 8th-place finish in Division 2 secured their position in the league for the following season. In his second season as manager he took the team to the League Cup Final against Cambria in which two late goals saw them lose 3–2 on the night. A strong third-place finish was to follow in the league, gaining promotion to the top division for the first time in the club's history. Season 2018/19 brought a tough challenge in the top division in which they finished a respectable sixth in the table. Robertson took his team to the semi-final of all three cup competitions narrowly missing out on each occasion. In the 2021–22 season the side won the Greater Glasgow Premier Division title and two league cups under Graeme Robertson Jnr.

==== Saturday Morning Team ====
The Saturday Morning side was created for the 2022–23 season. The squad is managed by Chris McColl (previously of E.K Thistle) and assisted by Gordon Wilson and Daniel Drennan. The team is captained by Calum Campbell and currently play in Division 1B in the Saturday Morning Amateur Football Association.

2023/24 resulted in the team gaining promotion to the Championship League.

2024/25 the side won the Saturday Morning Lanarkshire Cup, beating Cambusnethen Talbot 3-2 in the final, with goals coming from Michael Carroll and Peter Carr x2.

==== Over 35's Team ====
The 'YM' over 35's team is currently managed by Andy Dykes, who led the team to victory in the Scottish Amateur Cup against Fairmilehead 35s. The 35s Scottish cup final was played at New Douglas Park, Hamilton on 18/11/22. After going down 0–2, the team battled back with two goals from Kieran Downs to take the game to penalties winning 4–2 with Alan McFadden scoring the winning penalty and bringing the Scottish cup to East Kilbride for the first time ever. The squad has included former professional players, brothers Robbie and David Winters, Alan McFadden and Ricky Waddell.

== Annual Tournament ==
The "YM Invitational Cup" is a pre-season invitational competition hosted by East Kilbride YM. The four-week competition was first held in 2010 and has taken place each summer since. Since 2013, 16 teams have competed in the adults' competition. In 2013 an under-19's tournament was introduced to run alongside the adults cup with eight teams participating.

The competition follows a Champions League style set up with initial group stages and progressing to a knockout stage.

East Kilbride YM won their inaugural tournament in 2010, Rolls Royce in 2012, and Broomhouse won the 2013 and 2014 editions.

The 'YM' won the most recent tournament in 2021

== Facilities ==
EK United Community Club operates the playing fields at Kirktonholme, West Mains Road. The facilities include a grass pitch maintained with the assistance of All Grass Turf Care, home changing rooms, and a function suite and games room that are also used by local children's clubs.

== Player of the Year Statistics ==
=== Caledonian League Team ===
	Players POTY	Managers POTY	Golden Boot
2017-18	Cameron McCulloch & Ryan Kelly	Michael Carroll	Cameron McCulloch
2016-17	Ross McDonagh	James Cameron	Craig Tocher
2015-16	Jordan Fletcher, Fraser Campbell & Craig Kincaid	Cameron McCulloch	Craig Tocher
2014–15	Connor McCann	Zander McMillan	Connor McCann
2013–14	Stewart Bovill	Paul McLean	Garry O'Hanlon
2012–13	Paul Tierney	Stewart Bovill	David Atha
2011–12	Craig Duncan	Paul Tierney	Alan McRae
2009–10	Stewart Bovill	Alan McRae	Alan McRae
2008–09	Steven Chaplain	Steven Chaplain	Steven Chaplain

=== Scottish Amateur Team ===
	Players POTY	Managers POTY	Golden Boot
2015–16	James Cameron	Grant Beattie	James Cameron
2014–15	Iain Taylor	Scott Cairns	Iain Taylor
2013–14	William Dawson	Stephen McKenna	William Dawson
2010–11	Kevin McCarthy	John McNamara	Paul McCaig
2008–09	William Dawson	William Dawson	Iain Taylor
2007–08	Graeme Robertson Jnr	Graeme Robertson Snr	Iain Paterson

=== Greater Glasgow Team ===
	Players POTY	Managers POTY	Golden Boot
2018–19	Josh Cairns & Jack Ferguson	Josh Cairns	Declan Heron
2017–18	Paul McLean	Mark O'Donnell	Scott Campbell
2016–17	Ross Anderson	Ross Anderson	Mikey Carroll
2015–16	Scott Anderson	Chris McAleny	Scott Campbell
2014–15	Scott Campbell	Scott Campbell	Scott Campbell
2013–14	Gary McCulloch	Craig Kincaid	Ross McDonagh
2012–13	William Dawson	Kenny Corbett	David Atha

== Club officials ==
East Kilbride YM

- Honorary President: Angus McConnell JP
- Chairman: Graeme Robertson
- Club Secretary/Treasurer: Graeme Robertson
- Media Guru: Bobby Jarvie
- Committee Members: Les Goodfellow, Andy Dykes, Graeme Robertson JNR, Allan Cairns, Declan Harley, John Green, Ross McDonagh, Michael Mochan.

Caledonian League Team

- Manager: Graeme Robertson SNR
- Head Coach: Graeme Robertson JNR
- Assistant Manager: Billy Hamilton
- Goalkeeper Coach: David Lindsay
- Captain: Gary McGarth

Greater Glasgow Premier League Team

- Manager: Ian Patterson
- Assistant Manager: Stephen McKenna
- Captain: Sean Burke
- Vice Captain: Chris McAlaney

Saturday Morning Team

- Manager: Chris McColl
- Assistant Manager: Gordon Wilson
- Head Coach: Daniel Drennan
- Captain: Calum Campbell
- Vice Captain: Gary Noble

Over 35's Team

- Manager: Andy Dykes
- Captain: Ricky Waddell
- Vice Captain: Greg Hannah

== Players ==
=== Goalkeepers ===
Note: Flags indicate national team as defined under FIFA eligibility rules; some limited exceptions apply. Players may hold more than one non-FIFA nationality.

No.	Pos.	Nation	Player
—	GK	SCO	Paul Tiernan
—	GK	SCO	Fraser Campbell
—	GK	SCO	Ross Calder
—	GK	SCO	Graeme McMillan

No.	Pos.	Nation	Player

=== Defenders ===
Note: Flags indicate national team as defined under FIFA eligibility rules; some limited exceptions apply. Players may hold more than one non-FIFA nationality.

No.	Pos.	Nation	Player
—	DF	SCO	Tom Elliot
—	DF	SCO	Cammy Fyfe
—	DF	SCO	Stuart Gordon
—	DF	SCO	Dougie Carswell

No.	Pos.	Nation	Player
—	DF	SCO	Lee Ferguson
—	DF	SCO	Craig Kincaid
—	DF	SCO	Ryan Kelly
—	DF	SCO	Billy Robertson Jordan Calder Liam Sloan

=== Midfielders ===
Note: Flags indicate national team as defined under FIFA eligibility rules; some limited exceptions apply. Players may hold more than one non-FIFA nationality.

No.	Pos.	Nation	Player
—	MF	SCO	Geo Paton
—	MF	SCO	David Thomson
—	MF	SCO	Sean Burke
—	MF	SCO	Josh Cairns
—	MF	SCO	Scott Cairns
—	MF	SCO	James Cameron
—	MF	SCO	Scott Campbell

No.	Pos.	Nation	Player
—	MF	SCO	David Cameron
—	MF	SCO	Jordan Fletcher
—	MF	SCO	Darren Litterick
—	MF	SCO	Ross Anderson
—	MF	SCO	Cameron McCulloch
—	MF	SCO	Mark O'Donnell

=== Forwards ===
Note: Flags indicate national team as defined under FIFA eligibility rules; some limited exceptions apply. Players may hold more than one non-FIFA nationality.

No.	Pos.	Nation	Player
—	FW	SCO	Connor McCann
—	FW	SCO	Ross McDonagh
—	FW	SCO	Fraser Gray
—	FW	SCO	Mikey Carroll

== Honours ==
Caledonian League Presidents Cup

- 2014–15, 2018–19

Queens Park Challenge Trophy

- 1997–98

Caledonian League Division 1A Winners

- 2018–19

Caledonian league 2nd Division

- 1995–96

Scottish Amateur Premier League Cup

- 1995

Scottish Amateur 2nd Division

- 1968, 1976, 2003, 2011

Scottish Amateur 3rd Division

- 1973

Scottish Amateur Coronation Cup

- 1961, 2015/16

Scottish Amateur Reserve Division One

- 1953, 1976, 1977, 1979, 1980

Hall Cup

- 1978, 2011, 2017

Ball Trophy

- 1952, 1974, 1978

Scottish YMCA Cup

- 1967

Scottish Cup Over 35's

- 2022
