= Voluntary Park =

Sports venue in Ayr, Scotland

- Location within South Ayrshire
- Location: Whitletts, Ayr, South Ayrshire.
- Coordinates: 55°28′27″N 4°36′14″W
- Closed: 2011

Voluntary Park was a football stadium and greyhound racing stadium in the Whitletts area of Ayr, South Ayrshire.

== Greyhound racing ==
Ayr Greyhound Stadium opened on 6 August 1983 and the first race was won by a greyhound called Dingle. The stadium was also known as Whittlets due to the fact that the track was located in Glenmuir Place off the Whitletts Road. The track circumference was 410 yards and distances were 300, 500 and 700 yards and the principal race was the September Gold Cup. The management declined an invite from the National Greyhound Racing Club in 1989.

== Football ==
Originally Voluntary Park was a football stadium and it was the traditional home of Whitletts Victoria F.C. The stadium was built after World War II.

== Closure ==
The stadium closed in 2011 due to health and safety concerns by the South Ayrshire Council.
