= 2026–27 Lowland Football League =

Scottish football league season

Lowland League
- Season: 2026–27
- Dates: 25 July 2026 – 17 April 2027

The 2026–27 Scottish Lowland Football League (known as the Park's Motor Group Scottish Lowland Football League for sponsorship reasons) is the 14th season of the Lowland Football League, part of the fifth tier of the Scottish football pyramid system. Linlithgow Rose are the defending champions.

This is the first season in the league's current format after it was split into Lowland League East and Lowland League West following the conclusion of the 2025–26 season.

== Background ==
Ahead of the 2025–26 season, the Scottish Lowland Football League voted for league reconstruction which would see the league split into two divisions of 16 teams plus guest teams known as Lowland League East and Lowland League West. As a result, no teams were relegated in 2025–26 and teams were instead promoted from the West of Scotland League, the East of Scotland League, the South of Scotland League and the Midlands Football League. After failing to secure promotion to League Two, Brechin City transferred to the Lowland League from the Highland Football League.

Linlithgow Rose were denied the opportunity to earn promotion via the play-offs after failing to secure the necessary licence.

Heart of Midlothian decided against retaining a B team in the league as a guest team and instead opted to focus on cooperation agreements with other clubs.

== Lowland League East ==
Lowland League East
- Season: 2026–27
- Dates: 25 July 2026 – 17 April 2027
- Matches: 110
- Goals: 355 (3.23 per match)
- Biggest home win: Linlithgow Rose 5–0 Gala Fairydean Rovers (8 August 2026); Bonnyrigg Rose 6–1 University of Stirling (19 September 2026)
- Biggest away win: Bo'ness United 0–5 Lochee United (15 September 2026); Dunipace 0–5 Linlithgow Rose (18 November 2026)
- Highest scoring: 7 matches: 7 goals (Note: The matches were Brechin City 4–3 Berwick Rangers on 8 August 2026, Gala Fairydean Rovers 3–4 Hill of Beath Hawthorn on 22 August 2026, Lochee United 5–2 Linlithgow Rose on 22 August 2026, University of Stirling 2–5 Bo'ness United on 29 August 2026, Bonnyrigg Rose 6–1 University of Stirling on 19 September 2026, Berwick Rangers 2–5 East Stirlingshire on 31 October 2026, and Civil Service Strollers 4–3 Gala Fairydean Rovers on 7 November 2026.)
- Longest winning run: 9 matches: Linlithgow Rose
- Longest unbeaten run: 10 matches: Tranent
- Longest winless run: 10 matches: Berwick Rangers
- Longest losing run: 8 matches: Gala Fairydean Rovers
- All statistics correct as of 18 November 2026.

2026–27 Lowland League East
Team locations:
1 Berwick Rangers
2 Bo'ness United
3 Bonnyrigg Rose
4 Brechin City
5 Broxburn Athletic
6 Civil Service Strollers
7 Cowdenbeath
8 Dunipace
9 East Stirlingshire
10 Gala Fairydean Rovers
11 Hill of Beath Hawthorn
12 Linlithgow Rose
13 Lochee United
14 Musselburgh Athletic
15 Tranent
16 University of Stirling

Defending champions Linlithgow Rose were placed into Lowland League East alongside existing Lowland League sides Berwick Rangers, Bo'ness United, Bonnyrigg Rose, Broxburn Athletic, Civil Service Strollers, Cowdenbeath, East Stirlingshire, Gala Fairydean Rovers, Tranent and University of Stirling. Brechin City transferred to the league from the Highland League. Hill of Beath Hawthorn, Musselburgh Athletic and Dunipace were promoted from the East of Scotland League and Lochee United were promoted from the Midlands League.

=== Teams ===
Club	Location	Ground	Surface	Capacity	Seats	Ref.
Berwick Rangers	Berwick-upon-Tweed	Shielfield Park	Grass	4,099	1,366	
Bo'ness United	Bo'ness	Newtown Park	Artificial	2,000	0	
Bonnyrigg Rose	Bonnyrigg	New Dundas Park	Grass	2,400	72	
Brechin City	Brechin	Glebe Park	Grass	3,650	1,519	
Broxburn Athletic	Broxburn	Albyn Park	Artificial	2,050	0	
Civil Service Strollers	Edinburgh	Christie Gillies Park	Grass	1,596	96	
Cowdenbeath	Cowdenbeath	Central Park	Grass	4,309	1,622	
Dunipace	Denny	Westfield Park	Artificial	1,000	0	
East Stirlingshire	Stenhousemuir	Ochilview Park (Note: East Stirlingshire are ground-sharing with Stenhousemuir.)	Artificial	3,746	626	
Gala Fairydean Rovers	Galashiels	Netherdale	Artificial	2,000	500	
Hill of Beath Hawthorn	Hill of Beath	Keir's Park	Grass	1,080	0	
Linlithgow Rose	Linlithgow	Prestonfield	Grass	1,773	301	
Lochee United	Dundee	Thomson Park	Grass	2,000	0	
Musselburgh Athletic	Musselburgh	Olivebank Stadium	Grass	1,500	0	
Tranent	Tranent	Foresters Park	Grass	1,200	44	
University of Stirling	Stirling	Forthbank Stadium (Note: University of Stirling are ground-sharing with Stirling Albion.)	Grass	3,800	2,508	

=== League table ===
Pos	Team	Pld	W	D	L	GF	GA	GD	Pts	Qualification
1	Tranent	14	11	2	1	28	11	+17	35	Qualification for the Pyramid play-off
2	Linlithgow Rose	14	11	1	2	40	13	+27	34	
3	Brechin City	14	10	2	2	31	16	+15	32	
4	Broxburn Athletic	14	8	4	2	21	14	+7	28	
5	Hill of Beath Hawthorn	13	8	2	3	19	15	+4	26	
6	Lochee United	13	7	3	3	28	18	+10	24	
7	Bonnyrigg Rose	14	7	2	5	29	16	+13	23	
8	Bo'ness United	14	7	1	6	25	29	−4	22	
9	Civil Service Strollers	13	6	3	4	24	23	+1	21	
10	East Stirlingshire	15	4	4	7	25	31	−6	16	
11	Cowdenbeath	13	4	2	7	19	23	−4	14	
12	Musselburgh Athletic	13	2	6	5	11	16	−5	12	
13	Gala Fairydean Rovers	15	2	1	12	21	37	−16	7	
14	University of Stirling	15	2	1	12	13	33	−20	7	
15	Berwick Rangers	14	1	3	10	13	27	−14	6	Possible relegation to Tier 6
16	Dunipace	12	1	1	10	8	33	−25	4	Possible relegation to Tier 6

Updated to match(es) played on 18 November 2026. Source:
Rules for classification: 1) Points; 2) Goal difference; 3) Number of goals scored

=== Results ===
Home \ Away	BER	BNS	BON	BRE	BRX	CSS	COW	DUN	EAS	GFR	HOB	LIN	LOC	MUS	TRA	STI
Berwick Rangers			0–2						2–5		0–2	0–1		0–0	1–2	3–2
Bo'ness United			0–4	3–1	1–2	2–0		3–1	2–0				0–5		1–2	
Bonnyrigg Rose		0–1		1–2					4–1	2–1	1–2				0–1	6–1
Brechin City	4–3				4–0			3–0	3–1		0–1			3–1		0–0
Broxburn Athletic	2–0					1–1				1–0		0–4	3–0	0–0	1–1	
Civil Service Strollers	2–1		2–0	0–2			3–2		3–3	4–3	4–0					3–2
Cowdenbeath	2–1		2–2		0–2				2–0	0–1			3–1		0–3	4–2
Dunipace					2–2	2–1			0–3	1–5		0–5	1–2	1–3		
East Stirlingshire				3–3	1–2		2–2					2–4		0–0	0–3	2–0
Gala Fairydean Rovers	1–1	1–3	1–2	2–3	0–4						3–4		2–3			
Hill of Beath Hawthorn							2–0	1–0	1–2			1–2	1–1	1–0		
Linlithgow Rose		4–1				1–1	3–2	4–0		5–0						3–0
Lochee United	1–1		2–2	1–2								5–2		2–1		
Musselburgh Athletic		2–2	0–3							2–0	1–1	0–2			1–1	
Tranent		5–1				4–0	1–0			2–1		1–0	0–4			
University of Stirling	1–0	2–5		0–1	0–1			1–0			1–2		0–1		1–2	

Updated to match(es) played on 18 November 2026. Source:
Legend: Blue = home team win; Yellow = draw; Red = away team win.

== Lowland League West ==
Lowland League West
- Season: 2026–27
- Dates: 25 July 2026 – 17 April 2027
- Matches: 122
- Goals: 496 (4.07 per match)
- Biggest home win: Auchinleck Talbot 6–0 Dalbeattie Star (25 July 2026); Auchinleck Talbot 7–1 Beith Juniors (19 August 2026); Clydebank 7–1 Gretna 2008 (22 August 2026)
- Biggest away win: Newton Stewart 0–9 Auchinleck Talbot (1 August 2026)
- Highest scoring: Dalbeattie Star 2–8 Clydebank (31 October 2026)
- Longest winning run: 6 matches: Kilwinning Rangers
- Longest unbeaten run: 8 matches: Clydebank
- Longest winless run: 14 matches: Dalbeattie Star
- Longest losing run: 9 matches: Dalbeattie Star
- All statistics correct as of 18 November 2026.

2026–27 Lowland League West
Team locations:
1 Albion Rovers
2 Auchinleck Talbot
3 Beith
4 Caledonian Braves
5 Celtic B
6 Clydebank
7 Cumbernauld Colts
8 Cumnock
9 Dalbeattie Star
10 Gretna 2008
11 Johnstone Burgh
12 Kilwinning Rangers
13 Largs Thistle
14 Newton Stewart
15 Pollok
16 Renfrew
17 Troon

Existing Lowland League sides Albion Rovers, Caledonian Braves, Clydebank, Cumbernauld Colts and Gretna 2008 were placed into Lowland League West alongside guest club Celtic B. Auchinleck Talbot, Cumnock Juniors, Troon, Pollok, Largs Thistle, Johnstone Burgh, Kilwinning Rangers, Renfrew and Beith Juniors were promoted from the West of Scotland League while Dalbeattie Star and Newton Stewart were promoted from the South of Scotland League.

=== Teams ===
Club	Location	Ground	Surface	Capacity	Seats	Ref.
Albion Rovers	Coatbridge	Cliftonhill	Grass	1,250	489	
Auchinleck Talbot	Auchinleck	Beechwood Park	Grass	3,500	500	
Beith Juniors	Beith	Bellsdale Park	Grass	1,809	0	
Caledonian Braves	Motherwell	Alliance Park	Artificial	800	102	
Celtic B	Airdrie	Excelsior Stadium (Note: Celtic B are ground-sharing with Airdrieonians.)	Artificial	10,101	10,101	
Clydebank	Clydebank	Holm Park	Artificial	1,200	0	
Cumbernauld Colts	Cumbernauld	Broadwood Stadium	Artificial	7,936	7,936	
Cumnock Juniors	Cumnock	Townhead Park	Artificial	2,000	0	
Dalbeattie Star	Dalbeattie	Islecroft Stadium	Grass	1,320	100	
Gretna 2008	Gretna	Raydale Park	Artificial	1,046	138	
Johnstone Burgh	Johnstone	Keanie Park	Grass	2,393	0	
Kilwinning Rangers	Kilwinning	Buffs Park	Grass	2,800	0	
Largs Thistle	Largs	Barrfields Park	Artificial	3,000	800	
Newton Stewart	Newton Stewart	Blairmount Park	Artificial	1,000	0	
Pollok	Pollokshaws, Glasgow	Newlandsfield Park	Grass	2,088	0	
Renfrew	Renfrew	New Western Park	Artificial	1,000	0	
Troon	Troon	Portland Park	Grass	2,000	0	

=== League table ===
Pos	Team	Pld	W	D	L	GF	GA	GD	Pts	Qualification
1	Largs Thistle	16	11	2	3	25	15	+10	35	Qualification for the Pyramid play-off
2	Auchinleck Talbot	15	11	1	3	45	14	+31	34	
3	Kilwinning Rangers	14	11	1	2	44	18	+26	34	
4	Clydebank	14	10	2	2	50	25	+25	32	
5	Pollok	13	8	3	2	31	17	+14	27	
6	Caledonian Braves	13	8	2	3	35	23	+12	26	
7	Celtic B	14	7	2	5	34	26	+8	23	Ineligible for promotion or relegation
8	Cumnock Juniors	15	6	4	5	35	27	+8	22	
9	Johnstone Burgh	13	6	4	3	26	21	+5	22	
10	Troon	16	7	0	9	30	33	−3	21	
11	Renfrew	15	5	1	9	29	39	−10	16	
12	Cumbernauld Colts	13	3	6	4	28	28	0	15	
13	Gretna 2008	15	4	2	9	30	41	−11	14	
14	Albion Rovers	15	2	3	10	14	30	−16	9	
15	Beith Juniors	15	2	3	10	16	38	−22	9	
16	Newton Stewart	14	2	1	11	16	50	−34	7	Possible relegation to Tier 6
17	Dalbeattie Star	14	0	1	13	8	51	−43	1	Possible relegation to Tier 6

Updated to match(es) played on 18 November 2026. Source:
Rules for classification: 1) Points; 2) Goal difference; 3) Number of goals scored

=== Results ===
Home \ Away	ALB	AUC	BEI	CAL	CEL	CLY	CMB	CMN	DAL	GRE	JOB	KWN	LRG	NEW	PLK	REN	TRO
Albion Rovers		1–3		2–0			2–1					0–3	0–2			1–2	1–2
Auchinleck Talbot	1–0		7–1	3–1			1–0	4–0	6–0				0–1				3–0
Beith Juniors	1–1	2–4		2–4	3–2			2–2			0–1		1–1				1–3
Caledonian Braves	1–1					2–2		6–3				5–2		5–0			
Celtic B		2–2	3–0	0–1		6–1		4–1	2–0		1–1						
Clydebank	3–1		2–0	4–2	2–3					7–1			4–0	4–2	2–2		3–2
Cumbernauld Colts								2–2	2–2	3–2	4–4	2–4		5–2	1–1	2–2	
Cumnock Juniors	1–0		2–0							4–1			1–1	5–0		1–2	4–0
Dalbeattie Star					1–5	2–8		1–6		1–5					0–2		
Gretna 2008		0–2		2–3	3–1		3–3		2–0		2–2	1–5		3–0	2–3		
Johnstone Burgh	2–2					1–3			4–0					3–2		3–2	2–0
Kilwinning Rangers	3–1	3–0	1–2		4–0			2–2	4–0				2–0				
Largs Thistle		3–0					2–0	2–1 (Note: Match played at Billy Gilmour Stadium, Ardrossan, due to a curfew on the use of floodlights at Barrfields.)	1–0	3–2	1–0			2–0	1–3 (Note: Match played at Billy Gilmour Stadium, Ardrossan, due to a curfew on the use of floodlights at Barrfields.)		
Newton Stewart		0–9			4–0				2–1			1–3			2–2	0–3	1–5
Pollok	5–1		2–1	1–2							3–1					1–3	2–0
Renfrew			3–0	1–3	3–5	1–5						2–4	0–3		1–4		4–5
Troon							1–3		2–0	4–1	1–2	2–4	1–2			2–0	

Updated to match(es) played on 18 November 2026. Source:
Legend: Blue = home team win; Yellow = draw; Red = away team win.
