= Glenvale F.C. =

Association football club in Scotland

Glenvale
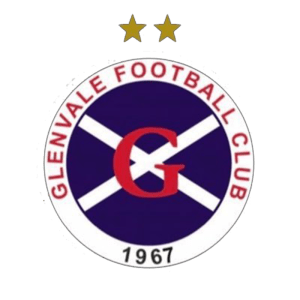
- Full name: Glenvale Football Club
- Nickname: The Vale
- Founded: 1967; 59 years ago
- Ground: Ferguslie Park Sports Centre, Paisley
- Capacity: 1,000
- Coordinates: 55°51′1″N 4°27′19″W
- Chairman: Danny Mckinn
- Manager: Lewis Mckinn
- 2025–26: West of Scotland League Third Division, 12th of 16
Home colours	Away colours

Glenvale Football Club is a Scottish football club based in Paisley. The club was founded in 1967. It currently plays at the Ferguslie Park Sports Centre. The club competes in the West of Scotland Football League Fourth Division.

== History ==
Glenvale was formed in 1967 by a group of men who worked for Stoddart Carpets at the Caledonia Street works in Paisley. The factory they worked in was called Glenvale and this is where they found the name for the club.

The Workers used to go for a kick about at lunchtimes in the fountain gardens in Paisley which was opposite the factory. They decided to form a football team (Glenvale FC) and joined the local Paisley and District Amateur football league. Games took place on a Saturday afternoon. The club now competes in the West of Scotland Football League. As of 2026, they are competing in the WOSFL Third Division, the 8th Tier of Scottish Football https://www.wosfl.co.uk/fg/1_184170169.html

Glenvale also made a piece of history when they became the first amateur team in Scotland to have their own social club which is in the towns Sandholes Street.

In the 1990s Glenvale added youth teams to their set up and at present they have teams from under 6 up to under 20s. Glenvale has also set up a football academy for kids as young as 4 interested in taking up the game.

The youth sectors of Glenvale, named "Reds", "Whites" and "Blacks", plays the Paisley Johnstone and District Youth Football League, the club has teams at age groups from Senior Football down to the 2022 age group. Source:

== Colours ==
The colours of the club are red, white and black

== Honours ==
West of Scotland Football League

- Fourth Division winners: 2023–24
