= St Cadoc's Y.C. =

St Cadoc's
- Full name: Saint Cadoc's Youth Club
- Nicknames: SCYC, the Cads
- Founded: 1987 (2020 as a Senior Team)
- Ground: New Tinto Park, Glasgow
- Capacity: 500
- Coordinates: 55°51′8″N 4°19′36″W
- Chairman: Brendan Boyle
- Manager: Chris Wilson
- League: West of Scotland League Premier Division
- 2025–26: West of Scotland League Premier Division, 16th of 16
Home colours	Away colours

St Cadoc's Youth Club is a Scottish football club based in Newton Mearns, East Renfrewshire. They were formed in 1987 by David Jones, janitor at St Cadoc's Primary School and have grown into a large community sports club playing football and netball.

The club formed an adult side and successfully applied to join the newly founded West of Scotland Football League for the 2020–21 season. As part of the facility requirements for the league, they have an agreement to groundshare with fellow West of Scotland League club Benburb at New Tinto Park in Govan, Glasgow. St Cadoc’s currently play in the West of Scotland Premier Division. They are the current holders of the Strathclyde Demolition Cup.

== History ==
St Cadoc's YC were formed in 1987 by the primary school janitor, David Jones. The club is one of Scotland's largest clubs in terms of the number of registered players the club holds from all age groups. St Cadoc's first entered senior football at the beginning of the 2020-21 season, after being accepted into the inaugural West of Scotland Football League. During their first season, the COVID-19 pandemic hit, curtailing the season, with the Cads sitting in 4th place with only 8 games played in Conference B.

For the 2021-22 season, St Cadoc's enjoyed success in their first full season, finishing 2nd place in Conference B. This meant that the club qualified for the new West of Scotland First Division, tier 7 in the Scottish pyramid system. The club also reached the Strathclyde Demolition Cup final, losing 2-0 to Drumchapel United at Buffs Park, Kilwinning.

In 2022-23, St Cadoc's finished in consecutive 2nd place finishes, 1 point behind league winners, Gartcairn. This gained the club promotion to the West of Scotland Premier Division, tier 6 in the Scottish pyramid system.

The 2023-24 season brought a huge turnaround in players and staff. Former East Kilbride interim manager and coach, Martin Fellowes, was drafted in with his backroom staff, who followed from the Lowland League club to help the Cads tackle their first season in the Premier Division. At the beginning of this season, the club gained their SJFA licence which allowed them to compete in the Scottish Junior Cup for the first time, reaching the quarter-finals stage, before losing to Johnstone Burgh on penalties. St Cadoc’s ended their debut season in the Premier Division with a 3rd place finish, 6 points behind champions Beith Juniors.

The 2024-25 season brought the club its first piece of senior silverware, winning the Strathclyde Demolition Cup. The match took place at Broadwood Stadium against Forth Wanderers which finished 8-2 to St Cadoc’s. This qualifies the club into the Cup Winners’ Shield against the East of Scotland Football League’s Alex Jack Cup winner, Whitburn Juniors and the Southern Counties F.A. Alba Cup winner, Lochar Thistle for a place in the 2025-26 Scottish Cup.

== Management Team ==
As of 6 July 2025

Position	Name
Manager	Gary Muir
Assistant Manager/Goalkeeping Coach	Lee Hollis
First Team Coach	Keiron Magennis
First Team Coach	Alan Smith

== Current squad ==
As of 2 July 2026

Note: Flags indicate national team as defined under FIFA eligibility rules; some limited exceptions apply. Players may hold more than one non-FIFA nationality.

No.	Pos.	Nation	Player
—	GK	SCO	Fergus Jackman
—	GK	SCO	Max Currie
—	GK	SCO	Ryan Truesdale
—	DF	SCO	Aiden Catlow
—	DF	SCO	Jamie Ballantyne (Captain)
—	DF	SCO	Kieran McAndrew
—	DF	SCO	Kyle Taylor
—	DF	SCO	Leo Fisher
—	DF	SCO	Ryan Lockie
—	DF	SCO	Rory McKendrick
—	MF	SCO	Danny Mathieson
—	MF	SCO	Harrison Jack
—	MF	SCO	Jamie Wilson
—	MF	SCO	Jay Shields
—	MF	SCO	Tinashe Mugwanda
—	FW	SCO	Fraser Anderson
—	FW	SCO	Franco Stewart (on loan from Pollok)
—	FW	SCO	Jamie Catlow

=== On loan ===
Note: Flags indicate national team as defined under FIFA eligibility rules; some limited exceptions apply. Players may hold more than one non-FIFA nationality.

No.	Pos.	Nation	Player
—	DF	SCO	Jack Parker (on loan at St Anthony's)

== Grounds ==
From 2020-2022, St Cadoc’s played their home matches at McKenna Park, the home of St Anthony’s. Since the 2022-23 season, St Cadoc’s have been ground-sharing at New Tinto Park, the home of Benburb.

New Tinto Park, is located just north of both the railway and the M8 motorway and fitted with 3G artificial turf.

New Tinto Park has also been used as the home ground for Rangers Women, from 2015 to 2019. Rossvale, now known as Caledonian Locomotives, and most recently, Queen’s Park Women.

== Honours ==
- Strathclyde Demolition Cup
  - Winners: 2024-25
  - Runners-up: 2021-22
- East, South & West of Scotland Cup-Winners Shield
  - Runners-up: 2024-25
