= Newmains United Community F.C. =

Association football club in Scotland

Newmains United Football Club
- Full name: Newmains United Football Club
- Founded: 2006
- Ground: Victoria Park, Newmains
- Capacity: 800
- Coordinates: 55°46′38″N 3°52′59″W
- Manager: David Menelaws
- League: West of Scotland League Fourth Division
- 2025–26: West of Scotland League Fourth Division, 11th of 16
Home colours	Away colours

Newmains United Football Club are a Scottish football club based in the village of Newmains, near the towns of Wishaw and Motherwell. They play their home games at Victoria Park and compete in the West of Scotland League Fourth Division.

Formed in 2006, they are the successors to Coltness United who were formed in 1934. They merged with amateur team Carluke FC in February 2018, keeping the same name

== Notable players ==
The club's most notable former player is Tommy Gemmell who went on to join Celtic and become part of the triumphant Lisbon Lions squad who won the European cup in 1967. Tommy led the call to arms to save the club in early 2015 when the lack of active committee members put Newmains' future in doubt.

Other famous former players are former Scotland manager Craig Brown and ex-Celtic goalkeeper Pat Bonner.

Brown joined Rangers from Coltness United in 1958 but failed to make a regular breakthrough into the first team and was eventually transferred to Dundee where he won the Scottish League Championship in 1962. Brown was named by the Tartan Army (Scotland Supporters Club) as 'Scotland's Greatest Ever Manager'.

One-time Republic of Ireland No1 Bonner played his first game in Scotland for Coltness after being farmed out so Celtic could see him in action. In his autobiography The Last Line Bonner writes:

"My playing introduction to Scottish football would be a tight little ground with a surprisingly large crowd that pressed hard in on you from all angles as I lined up for Coltness United against East Kilbride Thistle.

"I loved that kind of environment. Red-hot atmosphere, an audience so close you could hear them breathe and every player giving it his all.

"This was the first time I met a tremendous man who would influence my career greatly - Frank Connor. Frank worked with the then Celtic assistant manager Dave McParland and both of them reported back to Jock Stein on individual performances...

"The Coltness game had gone well and I enjoyed the whole trial."
