= Maybole Juniors F.C. =

Association football club in Maybole, Ayrshire, Scotland

Maybole Juniors
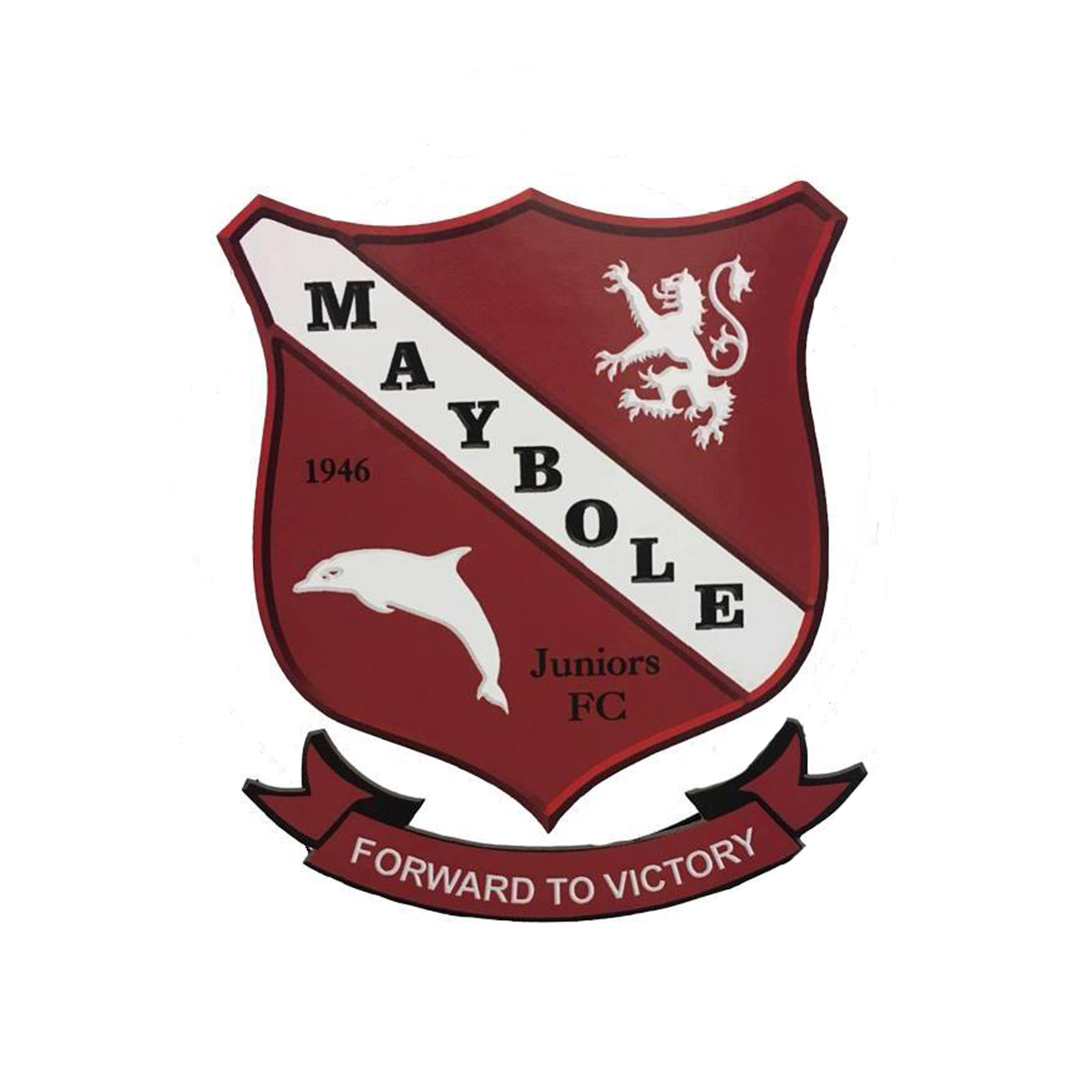
- Full name: Maybole Juniors Football Club
- Nickname: The Bole
- Founded: 1946
- Ground: Ladywell Stadium, Maybole
- Coordinates: 55°21′1″N 4°40′57″W
- Chairman: Alex Meek
- Manager: Graeme Neil
- League: West of Scotland League Second Division
- 2025–26: West of Scotland League Second Division, 10th of 16
- Website: https://www.theclubhq.com/maybole-juniors
| Home colours | Away colours |

Maybole Juniors Football Club are a Scottish football club based in the town of Maybole, Ayrshire. Formed in 1946, they are based at Ladywell Stadium, and currently compete in the West of Scotland League Second Division.

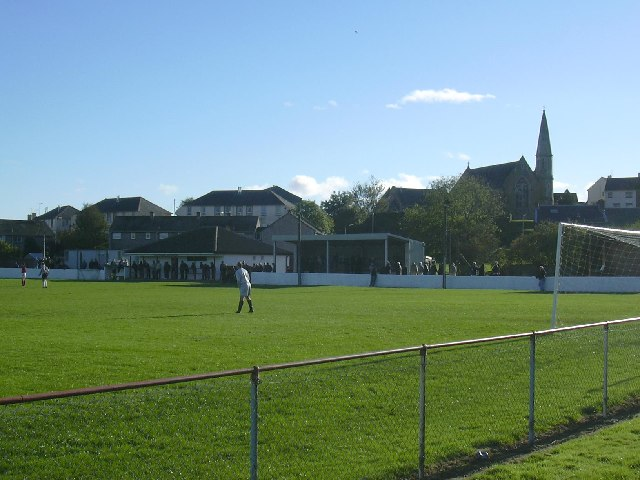
The club's home ground

== Current squad ==
As of 30 September 2022

Note: Flags indicate national team as defined under FIFA eligibility rules; some limited exceptions apply. Players may hold more than one non-FIFA nationality.

| No. | Pos. | Nation | Player |
|---|---|---|---|
| — | GK | SCO | Ally Semple (captain) |
| — | DF | SCO | Lewis Kirkwood (Vice-Captain) |
| — | DF | SCO | Craig Reid |
| — | DF | SCO | Stewart Maxwell |
| — | DF | SCO | Jack Smith |
| — | DF | SCO | Gavin Brown |
| — | MF | SCO | Paul Cameron |
| — | MF | SCO | Scott Dinwoodie |
| — | MF | SCO | Mackenzie Connelly |

| No. | Pos. | Nation | Player |
|---|---|---|---|
| — | MF | SCO | Cammy Marlow |
| — | MF | SCO | Stephen Mclelland |
| — | MF | SCO | Thomas Dempsie |
| — | MF | SCO | Calum Thomson |
| — | MF | SCO | Aaron Miller |
| — | MF | SCO | Euan Smith |
| — | FW | SCO | Michael Rielly |
| — | FW | SCO | Craig Harvey |
| — | FW | SCO | Michael McCann |
| — | FW | SCO | Roddy Patterson |
| — | FW | SCO | Andy Stevenson |

== Honours ==
- Ayrshire District League winners: 2003–04, 2011–12
- Kyle & Carrick Cup: 1991–92, 1993–94
- South Ayrshire Cup: 1995–96, 2001–02
- Vernon Trophy - 1962–63
- South Ayrshire Cup - 1995–96, 2001–02
