= Bonnyton Thistle F.C. =

Association football club in Scotland

Bonnyton Thistle
- Full name: Bonnyton Thistle Football Club
- Founded: 1912
- Ground: The Synergy Arena, Kilmarnock
- Capacity: 1,000 (100 seated)
- Coordinates: 55°36′50″N 4°30′40″W
- Club President: Ian Higgins
- Manager: Gordon Pope
- League: West of Scotland League First Division
- 2025–26: West of Scotland League Second Division, 3rd of 16 (promoted)
- Website: http://www.bonnytonthistlefc.co.uk/
Home colours	Away colours

Bonnyton Thistle Football Club is a Scottish football team based in the Bonnyton area in the town of Kilmarnock, East Ayrshire. They are members of the West of Scotland Football League, in the sixth tier of the Scottish football league system, having joined the league in 2020 from the South of Scotland Football League.

Founded in 1912, they were previously a youth and amateur team.

Their home ground is The Synergy Arena, located in the Townholm area of Kilmarnock, which has a capacity of 1,000. It was opened in 2017 to coincide with the club's move into senior football.

== Honours ==
=== Cup ===
- Southern Counties Cup/ Challenge Cup
  - Winners (1) : 2018–19.
- Alba Cup
  - Winners (1) : 2018–19.
- Detroit Trophy – Overall Championship
  - Winners (1) : 2018–19.

== Notable former players ==
- Craig Conway
- Alan Mahood
- Neil McGowan
- Derek Stillie
- Thomas O'Ware
