= Kello Rovers F.C. =

Association football club in Scotland

Kello Rovers
- Full name: Kello Rovers Football Club
- Nickname: Super K or "The Rovers"
- Founded: 1903
- Ground: Nithside Park, Kirkconnel
- Capacity: 1,700
- Coordinates: 55°23′12″N 4°0′16″W
- President: Mark Keggans
- Manager: Greg Gallagher
- League: Scottish GreenVersity Division 3
- 2025–26: West of Scotland League Third Division, 13th of 16
Home colours	Away colours

Kello Rovers Football Club is a Scottish football club, based in the town of Kirkconnel, Dumfries and Galloway. They currently play in the West of Scotland League Third Division.

== History ==
Traditionally Kello Rovers home strip has been black and white stripes since their formation in 1903. The team are currently managed by Greg Gallagher.

Nithside Park

Nicknamed Super K or The Rovers, the club play their home matches at Nithside Park in Kirkconnel. The ground has a capacity of 1,700 with a record attendance of 2,500 for a match against Broxburn Athletic during the 1974/75 season.

== Coaching staff ==
Position	Name
Manager	Greg Gallagher
Assistant Manager	Craig Dunlop
Goalkeeping Coach	Andrew Pollitt
Kit Man	Kenny Wilson

== Notable former players ==
- Kris Doolan - 300+ appearances and 100+ goals for Partick Thistle
- Willie Ferguson - 200+ appearances for Chelsea
- Davie Irons - Ayr United, Clydebank, Partick Thistle, Dunfermline Athletic, Gretna
- Andy Paton - Scotland international, 300+ appearances for Motherwell
- Alex Parker - Scotland international, 150+ appearances for Everton
- Quinton Young - Scotland U23 international, Ayr United, Coventry City, Rangers, East Fife
