= Whitletts Victoria F.C. =

Association football club in Scotland

Whitletts Victoria FC
- Full name: Whitletts Victoria Football Club
- Nickname: The Vics
- Founded: 1944
- Ground: New Voluntary Park, Ayr
- Capacity: TBC
- Coordinates: 55°28′26″N 4°35′54″W
- Chairman: Stuart Jackson
- Manager: Brian Reid
- League: West of Scotland League First Division
- 2025–26: West of Scotland League First Division, 12th of 16
- Website: https://www.whitlettsvictoria.com/
Home colours	Away colours

Whitletts Victoria Football Club are a Scottish football club, historically based in the Whitletts area of Ayr, South Ayrshire. The club currently play in the West of Scotland League First Division.

Nicknamed The Vics, the club were formed in 1944 and currently play at New Voluntary Park, Whitletts, near Ayr town centre. In February 2011, the club were forced to leave their traditional home of Voluntary Park in Whitletts, which doubled up as a greyhound racing track, after the local council closed the stadium. The stadium has since been demolished and is now the site of a new social housing complex named Victoria Crescent, after the club. Since then, the club has returned home to Whitletts to their new purpose-built stadium at New Voluntary Park.

== Current squad ==
As of 5 August 2024

Note: Flags indicate national team as defined under FIFA eligibility rules; some limited exceptions apply. Players may hold more than one non-FIFA nationality.

No.	Pos.	Nation	Player
—	GK	SCO	Darren Johnson
—	GK	SCO	
—	DF	SCO	Stewart Davidson
—	DF	SCO	Jamie Whyte
—	DF	SCO	
—	DF	SCO	Sam Ellis
—	DF	SCO	
—	DF	SCO	Rhys Wallace
—	DF	SCO	Craig Reid
—	MF	SCO	
—	MF	SCO	Fraser McMillan

No.	Pos.	Nation	Player
—	MF	SCO	
—	MF	SCO	Nathan Lennox
—	MF	SCO	Stevie McLelland
—	MF	SCO	
—	MF	SCO	Alec Bell
—	FW	SCO	Jordan Boyd
—	FW	SCO	Michael Moffatt
—	FW	SCO	

== History ==
On the park, the greatest era in the club's history was the mid- to late 1950s. In 1956 the club played in front of 20,100 people at Shawfield Stadium in the semi-final of the Scottish Junior Cup, only to lose 3–2 to eventual winners Petershill. However, in 1957-58 the Club won the Western League (South) Championship, losing out to North Champions Irvine Meadow in the play-off to determine the destination of the league championship itself.

In recent years, developments on and off the park have placed the club on a strong foundation. In 2017–18 the Club won promotion to the newly formed West Region Championship and in 2018 formed its own charity, Vics in the Community, providing free coaching to local youngsters and starting the development of a youth player pathway.

In 2020, the club took the decision after 75 years of membership of the SJFA, to join the pyramid system in Scottish football as one of the inaugural members of the West of Scotland Football League.

On 10 October 2020, the club announced they would not be participating in the inaugural season of the West of Scotland League due to concerns relating to the COVID-19 pandemic.

On 22 November 2025, the club won the Strathclyde Cup, its first piece of silverware in 35 years, beating Campbeltown Pupils 7–0.

== Non-playing staff ==
=== Committee ===
Position	Name
Chairman	Stuart Jackson
Vice chair	-
Secretary	Mark Porter
Treasurer	Marna Fergusson
Commercial Manager	-
Committee member	Kim Porter Graham McCall Senior

=== Management ===
Position	Name
Manager	Brian Reid
Assistant Manager	Michael Moffat
First Team Coach	Graham McCall
Sports First Aider	Kari Moore

== Honours ==
- Western League (South): Champions 1957–58
- Ayrshire Second Division: Winners 1979–80, 1981–82, 1985–86
- Kyle & Carrick Cup: Winners 1988–89, 1989–90
- Strathclyde Cup: Winners 2025–26
