= Craigmark Burntonians F.C. =

Association football club in Scotland

- Full name: Craigmark Burntonians Football Club
- Nickname: The Mark
- Founded: 1929
- Ground: Station Park, Dalmellington
- Capacity: 1000
- Coordinates: 55°19′31″N 4°24′12″W
- Chairman: Lee Orr
- League: West of Scotland League Second Division
- 2025–26: West of Scotland League Third Division, 1st of 16 (promoted)
Home colours	Away colours

Craigmark Burntonians Football Club are a Scottish football club, based in the town of Dalmellington, Ayrshire. Nicknamed The Mark, they were formed in 1929 and play at Station Park. Currently playing in the West of Scotland League Second Division, they wear red strips (uniforms) with a white trim.

== Honours ==
- Ayrshire Second Division winners: 1982–83
- Ayrshire League (Kerr & Smith) Cup: 1963–64, 1964–65, 1980–81
- Ayrshire District (Irvine Times) Cup: 1963–64
- Cumnock & Doon Cup: 1989–90
- Ayrshire Super Cup: 1989–90
- West of Scotland Football League Third Division Champions 2025-26
