= Drumchapel United F.C. =

Football club in Glasgow, Scotland

Drumchapel United
- Full name: Drumchapel United Football Club
- Nickname: The Drum
- Founded: 2001
- Ground: Donald Dewar Centre; Drumchapel, Glasgow
- Coordinates: 55°54′35″N 4°22′3″W
- Co-managers: Adam Hopes & John Black
- League: West of Scotland League Premier Division
- 2025–26: West of Scotland League Premier Division, 12th of 16
- Website: https://drumchapelunitedfc.co.uk/
| Home colours | Away colours |

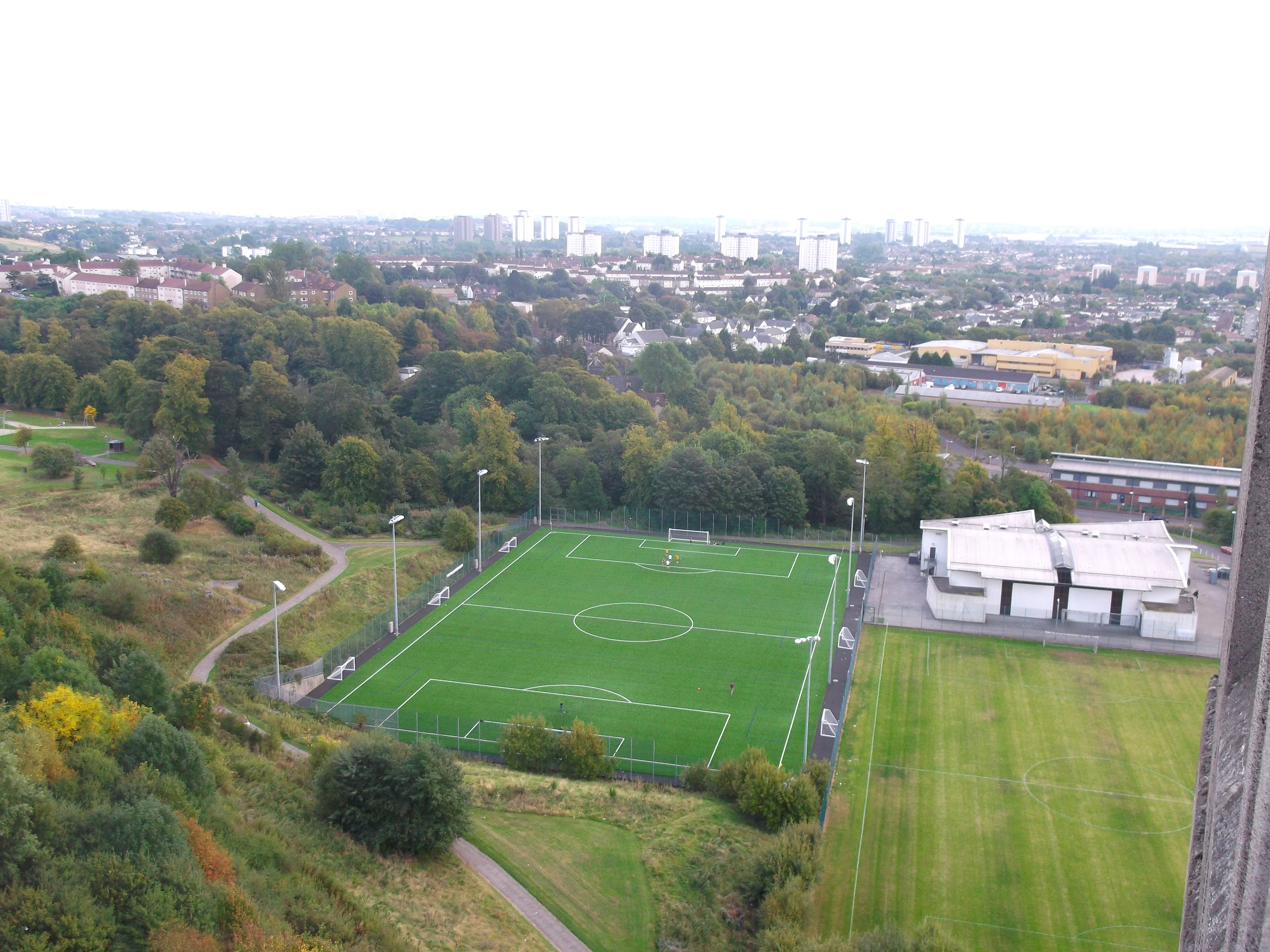
View of the team's home venue at the Donald Dewar Sports Centre

Drumchapel United Football Club is a Scottish football club based in the Glasgow district of Drumchapel, currently competing in the West of Scotland League Premier Division.

Formed as an amateur club in 2001, they fielded teams in the Central Scottish AFL and the Football Central Sunday AFL and were winners of the Scottish Amateur Cup in 2007 (runners-up in 2010 and 2011), also lifting the West of Scotland Cup four times.

The club successfully applied for their first team to join the newly founded West of Scotland Football League for the 2020–21 season.

Beyond the adult teams, there is an established youth system with multiple teams for boys and girls (the latter affiliated to Partick Thistle W.F.C.), and community involvement.

In their first full season in the West of Scotland League, Drumchapel finished 2nd in Conference C. After winning the Strathclyde Cup they went on to secure the Cup-Winners Shield and qualified for the 2022–23 Scottish Cup. They reached the fourth round of the competition, beating Easthouses Lily, Nairn County, Gretna 2008, and FC Edinburgh before losing 2–1 to Elgin City. Their 1–0 win over FC Edinburgh from SPFL League One in the third round (61 places above them) is a record for the biggest difference in league position for a lower ranked winning club in Scottish Cup history.

== Current squad ==
As of 10 July 2026

Note: Flags indicate national team as defined under FIFA eligibility rules; some limited exceptions apply. Players may hold more than one non-FIFA nationality.

| No. | Pos. | Nation | Player |
|---|---|---|---|
| TBC | GK | SCO | Connor Keaney |
| — | GK | SCO | Evan Currie |
| — | GK | SCO | Reece Murdoch |
| — | GK | SCO | Sam Murdoch (on loan from Greenock Morton) |
| — | GK | IRL | Ryan Scully |
| — | DF | SCO | Callum MacKenzie |
| — | DF | SCO | Connor Greene |
| — | DF | SCO | Kevin Nicoll |
| — | DF | SCO | Martin Orr |
| — | DF | SCO | Michael Hardie |
| — | DF | SCO | Ruaridh McIntyre |
| — | MF | SCO | Andy Geggan |

| No. | Pos. | Nation | Player |
|---|---|---|---|
| — | MF | SCO | Alex Docherty |
| — | MF | SCO | Darren Christie |
| — | MF | SCO | Finn Coyle-Morrow |
| — | MF | SCO | Jamie Gilmartin |
| — | MF | SCO | Robbie Brander |
| — | FW | SCO | Botti Biabi |
| — | FW | SCO | Dominic Innes |
| — | FW | POR | Joao Victoria |
| — | FW | SCO | Lewis McTaggart |

== Honours ==
West of Scotland Football League First Division

- winners: 2023-24

Strathclyde Cup

- winners: 2021–22, 2023–24

East, South & West of Scotland Cup-Winners Shield

- winners: 2021–22

South Challenge Cup

- runners-up: 2022–23
