= Barrfields =

Public recreation space in Largs, North Ayrshire, Scotland

Coordinates: 55.8008°N 4.8675°W

Barrfields is a public recreation space on the site of Mansefield House in Largs, North Ayrshire, Scotland, originally given to the Largs Town Council in the 1920s, now owned by North Ayrshire Council and a leisure trust. The council subsequently built an extensive walled rose garden, a children's playpark, a theatre, meeting rooms, tearooms, a putting green and a sports ground (home to Largs Thistle). Only the sports ground, putting green and theatre remain.

From 1971 to 1973, much of the site was redeveloped into the Barrfields Sport and Leisure Centre, which became part of the Vikingar! Visitor and Leisure Centre.
