= 2016–17 West of Scotland Super League =

The 2016–17 West of Scotland Super League was the fifteenth Super League competition since the formation of the Scottish Junior Football Association, West Region in 2002. The league comprised two divisions, a West of Scotland Super League Premier Division of twelve clubs and a West of Scotland Super League First Division of fourteen clubs. There were two automatic relegation places between the divisions, while the third-bottom placed side in the Premier Division entered the West Region league play-off, a two-legged tie against the third placed side in the First Division, to decide the final promotion/relegation spot. The winners of the Super League Premier Division are eligible to enter round one of the 2017–18 Scottish Cup.

== Super League Premier Division ==
McBookie.com West of Scotland Super League Premier Division
- Season: 2016–17
- Champions: Glenafton Athletic
- Relegated: Largs Thistle; Troon
- Matches: 132
- Goals: 408 (3.09 per match)
- Biggest home win: Kilbirnie Ladeside 5–0 Largs Thistle
- Biggest away win: Hurlford United 0–6 Cumnock Juniors
- Highest scoring: Arthurlie 4–5 Hurlford United

=== Member clubs for the 2016–17 season ===
Auchinleck Talbot were the reigning champions.

Cumnock Juniors and Largs Thistle were promoted from the Super League First Division, replacing the automatically relegated Petershill and Irvine Meadow.

Kiilwinning Rangers claimed a third promotion spot after defeating Shettleston 5–3 on aggregate in the West Region League play-off.

| Club | Location | Ground | Manager | Finishing position 2015–16 |
|---|---|---|---|---|
| Arthurlie | Barrhead | Dunterlie Park | Chris Mackie | 9th |
| Auchinleck Talbot | Auchinleck | Beechwood Park | Tommy Sloan | Champions |
| Beith Juniors | Beith | Bellsdale Park | John Millar | 7th |
| Cumnock Juniors | Cumnock | Townhead Park | John McKeown | Super League First Division, 1st |
| Glenafton Athletic | New Cumnock | Loch Park | Craig McEwan | 6th |
| Hurlford United | Hurlford | Blair Park | Darren Henderson | 2nd |
| Kilbirnie Ladeside | Kilbirnie | Valefield Park | Billy McGhie | 3rd |
| Kilwinning Rangers | Kilwinning | Abbey Park | Chris Strain | Super League First Division, 3rd |
| Kirkintilloch Rob Roy | Cumbernauld | Guy's Meadow ^{1} | Stuart Maxwell | 8th |
| Largs Thistle | Largs | Barrfields Stadium | Stuart Davidson | Super League First Division, 2nd |
| Pollok | Newlands, Glasgow | Newlandsfield Park | Tony McInally | 5th |
| Troon | Troon | Portland Park | Jim Kirkwood | 4th |

^{1} Groundsharing with Cumbernauld United F.C.

=== Managerial changes ===
| Club | Outgoing manager | Manner of departure | Date of vacancy | Position in table | Incoming manager | Date of appointment |
|---|---|---|---|---|---|---|
| Largs Thistle | Bryan Slavin | Resigned | 8 October 2016 | 12th | Stuart Davidson | 8 October 2016 |
| Kilbirnie Ladeside | Stephen Swift | Resigned | 13 November 2016 | 11th | Mark Bradley | 27 November 2016 |
| Arthurlie | Steve Kerrigan | Resigned | 18 December 2016 | 6th | Chris Mackie | 18 December 2016 |
| Kilbirnie Ladeside | Mark Bradley | Released | 20 May 2017 | 9th | Billy McGhie | 20 May 2017 |
| Troon | Gordon Burns | Resigned | 23 May 2017 | 12th | Jim Kirkwood | 23 May 2017 |

=== League table ===
| Pos | Team | Pld | W | D | L | GF | GA | GD | Pts | Qualification or relegation |
|---|---|---|---|---|---|---|---|---|---|---|
| 1 | Glenafton Athletic (C) | 22 | 14 | 4 | 4 | 35 | 21 | +14 | 46 | Qualification for 2017–18 Scottish Cup |
| 2 | Kirkintilloch Rob Roy | 22 | 13 | 4 | 5 | 37 | 21 | +16 | 43 | |
| 3 | Beith Juniors | 22 | 11 | 9 | 2 | 44 | 26 | +18 | 42 | |
| 4 | Auchinleck Talbot | 22 | 12 | 4 | 6 | 26 | 17 | +9 | 40 | |
| 5 | Hurlford United | 22 | 7 | 9 | 6 | 37 | 41 | −4 | 30 | |
| 6 | Cumnock Juniors | 22 | 8 | 5 | 9 | 36 | 31 | +5 | 29 | |
| 7 | Arthurlie | 22 | 9 | 2 | 11 | 37 | 48 | −11 | 29 | |
| 8 | Pollok | 22 | 7 | 5 | 10 | 41 | 33 | +8 | 26 | |
| 9 | Kilbirnie Ladeside | 22 | 6 | 7 | 9 | 29 | 34 | −5 | 25 | |
| 10 | Kilwinning Rangers (O) | 22 | 7 | 3 | 12 | 29 | 38 | −9 | 24 | Qualification for West Region League play-off |
| 11 | Largs Thistle (R) | 22 | 6 | 1 | 15 | 30 | 50 | −20 | 19 | Relegation to Super League First Division |
| 12 | Troon (R) | 22 | 5 | 1 | 16 | 28 | 49 | −21 | 16 | Relegation to Super League First Division |

Updated to match(es) played on 12 June 2017. Source: SJFA West Region
Rules for classification: 1) points; 2) goal difference; 3) number of goals scored.
(C) Champions; (O) Play-off winners; (R) Relegated

=== Results ===
| Home \ Away | ART | AUC | BEI | CMN | GLE | HUR | KLB | KWN | KRR | LRG | PLK | TRO |
|---|---|---|---|---|---|---|---|---|---|---|---|---|
| Arthurlie | | 0–4 | 1–4 | 3–1 | 1–1 | 4–5 | 4–3 | 3–1 | 0–2 | 4–2 | 1–6 | 3–0 |
| Auchinleck Talbot | 1–0 | | 1–1 | 3–0 | 0–1 | 2–0 | 0–1 | 0–2 | 1–0 | 2–1 | 2–1 | 1–0 |
| Beith Juniors | 2–0 | 3–0 | | 2–0 | 1–1 | 1–3 | 2–2 | 3–1 | 0–0 | 3–2 | 2–2 | 3–1 |
| Cumnock Juniors | 1–2 | 0–1 | 2–2 | | 0–1 | 1–1 | 3–1 | 4–1 | 2–4 | 4–0 | 3–1 | 2–0 |
| Glenafton Athletic | 2–0 | 3–1 | 1–3 | 1–1 | | 0–1 | 3–1 | 1–0 | 0–1 | 4–1 | 1–0 | 2–1 |
| Hurlford United | 0–1 | 2–2 | 2–2 | 0–6 | 2–3 | | 0–0 | 2–0 | 1–1 | 0–2 | 2–0 | 4–4 |
| Kilbirnie Ladeside | 1–1 | 0–1 | 0–0 | 0–0 | 0–3 | 2–2 | | 1–2 | 0–2 | 5–0 | 3–1 | 2–1 |
| Kilwinning Rangers | 1–2 | 0–1 | 3–1 | 1–1 | 1–1 | 2–2 | 1–3 | | 1–2 | 0–1 | 1–0 | 3–0 |
| Kirkintilloch Rob Roy | 2–0 | 0–0 | 0–2 | 1–0 | 0–2 | 4–2 | 0–1 | 5–1 | | 3–2 | 3–2 | 3–1 |
| Largs Thistle | 4–3 | 0–0 | 0–1 | 0–1 | 4–1 | 0–1 | 4–1 | 1–3 | 1–2 | | 1–4 | 2–1 |
| Pollok | 2–0 | 2–0 | 2–2 | 4–0 | 1–2 | 2–2 | 1–1 | 2–3 | 1–1 | 4–1 | | 3–1 |
| Troon | 2–3 | 0–3 | 2–4 | 2–4 | 0–1 | 2–3 | 3–1 | 2–1 | 1–0 | 3–1 | 1–0 | |

Updated to match(es) played on 12 June 2017. Source: SJFA West Region
Legend: Blue = home team win; Yellow = draw; Red = away team win.

=== West Region League play-off ===
Kilwinning Rangers retained their place in the West of Scotland Super League Premier Division after defeating Kilsyth Rangers 3–2 on aggregate in the West Region League play-off.

31 May 2017
19:30

| Kilsyth Rangers | 0 – 1 | Kilwinning Rangers |
|---|---|---|
| | Report | Monti |

Duncansfield Park, Kilsyth
2 June 2017
19:30

| Kilwinning Rangers | 2 – 2 | Kilsyth Rangers |
|---|---|---|
| Frye; McCloskey | Report | Davidson (2) |

Abbey Park, Kilwinning

== Super League First Division ==
McBookie.com West of Scotland Super League First Division
- Season: 2016–17
- Champions: Girvan
- Promoted: Clydebank
- Relegated: Yoker Athletic; Shotts Bon Accord; Blantyre Victoria; Irvine Victoria
- Matches: 182
- Goals: 640 (3.52 per match)
- Biggest home win: Kilsyth Rangers 8–0 Cumbernauld United
- Biggest away win: Shotts Bon Accord 0–7 Kilsyth Rangers
- Highest scoring: Blantyre Victoria 2–8 Petershill; Yoker Athletic 6–4 Blantyre Victoria

=== Member clubs for the 2016–17 season ===
The First Division had a 50% turnover of membership for the 2016–17 season with seven new clubs. Irvine Meadow and Petershill were automatically relegated from the Super League Premier Division and were joined by Shettleston who lost the West Region League play-off to Kilwinning Rangers.

Girvan and Irvine Victoria were promoted from the Ayrshire District League while Maryhill and Renfrew joined after gaining promotion from the Central District First Division.

| Club | Location | Ground | Manager(s) | Finishing position 2015–16 |
|---|---|---|---|---|
| Blantyre Victoria | Blantyre | KG Stadium | John Gibson | 5th |
| Clydebank | Clydebank | Holm Park | Kieran McAnespie | 4th |
| Cumbernauld United | Cumbernauld | Guy's Meadow | Andy Frame | 8th |
| Girvan | Girvan | Hamilton Park | Peter Leonard | Ayrshire District League, 1st |
| Irvine Meadow | Irvine | Meadow Park | Ross Wilson | Super League Premier Division, 12th |
| Irvine Victoria | Irvine | Victoria Park | Stevie Wilson | Ayrshire District League, 2nd |
| Kilsyth Rangers | Kilsyth | Duncansfield Park | Keith Hogg | 6th |
| Maryhill | Glasgow | Lochburn Park | John Hughes | Central District First Division, 2nd |
| Petershill | Glasgow | Petershill Park | Willie Paterson | Super League Premier Division, 11th |
| Renfrew | Renfrew | New Western Park | Colin Clark & Martin Ferry | Central District First Division, 1st |
| Rutherglen Glencairn | Rutherglen | Celsius Stadium | Willie Harvey | 7th |
| Shettleston | Glasgow | Greenfield Park | James McKenna | Super League Premier Division, 10th |
| Shotts Bon Accord | Shotts | Hannah Park | Kieran McGuinness | 9th |
| Yoker Athletic | Clydebank | Holm Park | Steven Reilly | 10th |

=== Managerial changes ===
| Club | Outgoing manager | Manner of departure | Date of vacancy | Position in table | Incoming manager | Date of appointment |
|---|---|---|---|---|---|---|
| Cumbernauld United | John Queen | Resigned | 3 September 2016 | 12th | George Shaw | 22 September 2016 |
| Maryhill | Jim Delaney | Resigned | 28 September 2016 | 14th | John Hughes | 4 October 2016 |
| Clydebank | Billy McGhie | Resigned | 28 December 2016 | 4th | Kieran McAnespie | 19 January 2017 |
| Shettleston | Ryan McStay & Peter Weatherson | Mutual consent | 8 January 2017 | 2nd | John Fallon | 15 January 2017 |
| Cumbernauld United | George Shaw | Sacked | 26 January 2017 | 10th | Andy Frame | |
| Irvine Meadow | Gareth Turner & Michael Wardrope | Resigned | End of season | 6th | Ross Wilson | 21 May 2017 |
| Shettleston | John Fallon | Mutual consent | End of season | 7th | James McKenna | 4 June 2017 |

=== League table ===
| Pos | Team | Pld | W | D | L | GF | GA | GD | Pts | Promotion or relegation |
|---|---|---|---|---|---|---|---|---|---|---|
| 1 | Girvan (C, P) | 26 | 16 | 4 | 6 | 59 | 30 | +29 | 52 | Promotion to Super League Premier Division |
| 2 | Clydebank (P) | 26 | 16 | 2 | 8 | 58 | 33 | +25 | 50 | Promotion to Super League Premier Division |
| 3 | Kilsyth Rangers (Q) | 26 | 13 | 10 | 3 | 67 | 32 | +35 | 49 | Qualification for West Region League play-off |
| 4 | Petershill | 26 | 14 | 6 | 6 | 70 | 33 | +37 | 48 | |
| 5 | Rutherglen Glencairn | 26 | 12 | 9 | 5 | 50 | 32 | +18 | 45 | |
| 6 | Irvine Meadow | 26 | 11 | 7 | 8 | 37 | 31 | +6 | 40 | |
| 7 | Shettleston | 26 | 12 | 4 | 10 | 43 | 44 | −1 | 40 | |
| 8 | Renfrew | 26 | 10 | 6 | 10 | 43 | 38 | +5 | 36 | |
| 9 | Cumbernauld United | 26 | 9 | 5 | 12 | 38 | 64 | −26 | 32 | |
| 10 | Maryhill | 26 | 9 | 4 | 13 | 35 | 60 | −25 | 31 | |
| 11 | Yoker Athletic (R) | 26 | 8 | 6 | 12 | 46 | 58 | −12 | 30 | Relegation to Central District First Division/Ayrshire District League |
| 12 | Shotts Bon Accord (R) | 26 | 8 | 0 | 18 | 30 | 65 | −35 | 24 | Relegation to Central District First Division/Ayrshire District League |
| 13 | Blantyre Victoria (R) | 26 | 5 | 4 | 17 | 33 | 64 | −31 | 19 | Relegation to Central District First Division/Ayrshire District League |
| 14 | Irvine Victoria (R) | 26 | 4 | 3 | 19 | 31 | 56 | −25 | 15 | Relegation to Central District First Division/Ayrshire District League |

Updated to match(es) played on 3 June 2017. Source: SJFA West Region
Rules for classification: 1) points; 2) goal difference; 3) number of goals scored.
(C) Champions; (P) Promoted; (Q) Qualified for the phase indicated; (R) Relegated

=== Results ===
| Home \ Away | BLA | CLY | CUM | GRV | IVM | IVV | KSY | MAR | PSH | REN | RUG | SHE | SBA | YOK |
|---|---|---|---|---|---|---|---|---|---|---|---|---|---|---|
| Blantyre Victoria | | 1–4 | 3–3 | 1–6 | 0–1 | 1–2 | 0–3 | 6–1 | 2–8 | 0–0 | 1–2 | 2–1 | 2–3 | 0–0 |
| Clydebank | 0–0 | | 3–0 | 2–1 | 0–1 | 2–1 | 1–4 | 5–0 | 5–2 | 1–2 | 0–2 | 4–1 | 3–0 | 3–4 |
| Cumbernauld United | 3–1 | 1–5 | | 2–2 | 0–3 | 4–3 | 2–2 | 0–0 | 0–3 | 3–2 | 1–1 | 3–2 | 3–6 | 0–4 |
| Girvan | 1–0 | 3–4 | 2–0 | | 3–2 | 4–0 | 2–2 | 3–0 | 1–0 | 1–0 | 0–3 | 6–1 | 4–1 | 3–1 |
| Irvine Meadow | 1–0 | 1–2 | 3–0 | 0–0 | | 3–1 | 4–1 | 2–1 | 1–1 | 0–1 | 1–1 | 3–0 | 2–0 | 2–1 |
| Irvine Victoria | 0–3 | 1–1 | 0–2 | 1–3 | 4–1 | | 0–1 | 2–3 | 2–2 | 1–3 | 0–1 | 0–1 | 0–2 | 2–0 |
| Kilsyth Rangers | 3–0 | 0–3 | 8–0 | 1–1 | 3–0 | 3–1 | | 1–1 | 1–1 | 3–2 | 2–2 | 2–2 | 6–0 | 1–1 |
| Maryhill | 2–0 | 3–0 | 3–0 | 0–1 | 2–2 | 3–2 | 2–5 | | 2–3 | 1–0 | 1–3 | 1–5 | 1–2 | 2–4 |
| Petershill | 4–2 | 1–2 | 1–2 | 1–3 | 2–0 | 2–0 | 5–1 | 6–0 | | 4–1 | 2–3 | 1–0 | 1–0 | 3–0 |
| Renfrew | 6–1 | 2–1 | 2–3 | 1–0 | 2–2 | 1–0 | 1–2 | 2–2 | 1–1 | | 1–1 | 0–1 | 3–0 | 3–3 |
| Rutherglen Glencairn | 3–0 | 1–2 | 1–4 | 3–1 | 0–0 | 2–1 | 1–1 | 5–0 | 2–2 | 3–1 | | 0–1 | 4–2 | 1–1 |
| Shettleston | 1–2 | 1–0 | 3–0 | 2–1 | 1–1 | 3–4 | 0–4 | 0–1 | 2–2 | 3–1 | 1–1 | | 1–0 | 2–1 |
| Shotts Bon Accord | 0–1 | 0–2 | 1–0 | 1–3 | 2–0 | 3–1 | 0–7 | 0–1 | 0–6 | 0–2 | 3–2 | 1–4 | | 0–1 |
| Yoker Athletic | 6–4 | 0–3 | 0–2 | 1–4 | 3–1 | 2–2 | 0–0 | 1–2 | 0–6 | 1–3 | 3–2 | 3–4 | 5–3 | |

Updated to match(es) played on 3 June 2017. Source: SJFA West Region
Legend: Blue = home team win; Yellow = draw; Red = away team win.
