= List of East Stirlingshire F.C. managers =

This chronological list of managers of East Stirlingshire Football Club comprises all those who have held the position of manager of the first team of East Stirlingshire F.C. since the position was created in 1966. The club's first ever manager was Lawrence Binnie in 1966, prior to then all management roles were assigned to the board of directors at the club. Sir Alex Ferguson's first ever managerial job was with East Stirlingshire. He managed the club during 1974 before moving to St Mirren. No manager has ever won a league title with the club, however, Billy Lamont managed the club to a runners-up spot in the 1979–80 Scottish Second Division. To date, every person to have managed the club has been from Scotland.

== Managers ==
Name	Nationality	From	To	Matches	Won	Drawn	Lost	Win%	Honours	Notes
Lawrence Binnie	Scotland	1966	1966							
Ian Crawford	Scotland	1966	1970							
Jim Rowan	Scotland	1970	1971							
Bob Shaw	Scotland	1971	1974							
Alex Ferguson	Scotland	June 1974	October 1974	17	9	2	6	52.94		
Ian Ure	Scotland	1974	1975							
Dan McLindon	Scotland	1975	1977							
Billy Lamont	Scotland	1977	1981						1 Second Division runners-up	
Martin Ferguson	Scotland	1981	1982							
Billy Little	Scotland	1983	1985							
Davie Whiteford	Scotland	May 1985	February 1987	71	16	14	41	22.54		
Dennis Lawson	Scotland	1987	1988							
David Connell	Scotland	1988	1989							
Alan Mackin	Scotland	1989	1990							
Dom Sullivan	Scotland	1990	1992							
Bobby McCulley	Scotland	1992	1993							
Billy Little	Scotland	1993	1997							
John Brownlie	Scotland	1997	1998							
Hugh McCann	Scotland	1998	1999							
George Fairley	Scotland	2000	2001							
Brian Ross	Scotland	February 2001	February 2002	43	9	13	21	20.93		
Gordon Russell	Scotland	February 2002	July 2002	17	7	2	8	41.18		
Danny Diver	Scotland	July 2002	March 2003	35	2	9	24	5.71		
Steve Morrison	Scotland	March 2003	May 2004	46	2	3	41	4.35		
Dennis Newell	Scotland	March 2004	December 2005							
Gordon Wylde	Scotland	January 2006	February 2008							
Jim McInally	Scotland	March 2008	May 2011	141	58	21	62	41.13		
John Coughlin	Scotland	May 2011	May 2014	122	30	20	72	24.59		
Craig Tully	Scotland	June 2014	May 2016	80	23	10	47	28.75		
John Sludden	Scotland	May 2016	August 2018	0	0	0	0	—		
Callum Tapping		October 2025								
