= List of East Stirlingshire F.C. players =

This is a list of footballers notable for their contributions to East Stirlingshire, from the formation of the club in 1881 to present. It generally includes only players who made more than 100 league appearances for the club, but some players with fewer than 100 appearances are also included. This includes players who represented their national team while with the club, and players who have set a club record, such as most appearances, most goals or biggest transfer fee.

Some of the players listed made few or no league appearances for East Stirlingshire, due to their playing for the club before it entered the Scottish Football League in 1900.

== Notable players ==
Players who represented their country while at the club.
Club record holder.

Bold type indicates that the player currently plays for the club.

Name	Nationality	Position (Note: For a full description of positions see Association football positions.)	East Stirlingshire career	League appearances	League goals	Notes
Steen Ian	Scotland	FW	1983—1985	63	0	
Davie Alexander	Scotland	FW		0	0	
Kenny Ashwood	Scotland	MF	1976–1981	152	14	
Alan Bennett	Scotland	MF	1976–1983	166	28	
Jim Blair	Scotland	DF	1978–1983	163	15	
Ian Browning	Scotland	MF	1969–1976	165	28	
Ernie Collumbine	Scotland	MF	1961–1965	126	7	
Tom Craig	Scotland	DF	1960–1968	259	0	
Jim Docherty	Scotland	FW	1977–1979	47	28	(Note: Docherty holds the record for largest transfer fee received by East Stirlingshire. Chelsea paid £35,000 for him in 1979.)
Russell Doig	Scotland	MF	1983–1986	109	9	
Craig Donaldson	Scotland	MF	2007–2011	108	8	
John Donnachie	Scotland	FW	1967–1972	111	69	
Tom Donnelly	Scotland	MF	1971–1978	216	26	
Peter Dunne	Scotland	DF	1972–1977	112	17	
Dave Forsyth	Scotland	FW	1955–1960	132	14	
Joe Frickleton	Scotland	MF	1959–1964	107	15	
Mike Geraghty	Scotland	FW	1992–1996	109	33	
Alex Gilchrist	Scotland	DF	1983–1990	196	8	
Alex Grant	Scotland	MF	1978–1983	128	33	
Arthur Hammill	Scotland	MF	1962–1971	266	39	
Billy Hulston	Scotland	MF	1966–1975	122	33	
Bobby Jones	Scotland		1964–1968	102	35	
Humphrey Jones	Wales			0	0	(Note: Jones holds the record for most international appearances while an East Stirlingshire player. He made five of his 14 appearances for Wales while he was with the club.)
Charlie Kelly	Scotland	GK	1978–1990	222	1	
Willie Laird	Scotland	DF	1959–1967	136	6	
Paul Lamont	Scotland	MF	1977–1982	130	23	
Scott Livingstone	Scotland	MF	2002–2007	124	6	
Sean MacAuley	Scotland	MF	2000–2005	112	9	
Dave McCaig	Scotland	MF	1978–1983	112	18	
Bobby McCulley	Scotland	MF	1972–1991	268	30	
Gordon McDougall	Scotland	GK	1993–1999	165	0	
Graham McGhee	Scotland	DF	2000–2005	139	2	
Allan McGonigal	Scotland	FW	1984–1988	100	14	
Jim McGregor	Scotland	DF	1970–1977	186	2	
James McKee	Scotland	FW				
Colin McKinnon	Scotland	MF	1991–1994	85	14	(Note: McKinnon holds the record for largest transfer fee paid by East Stirlingshire. Falkirk received £6,000 for him in 1991.)
Jackie McQueen	Scotland	DF	1962–1966	107	1	
Jim Meakin	Scotland	MF	1969–1985	272	32	
Brian Miller	Scotland	DF	1963–1969	117	0	
John Mitchell	Scotland	FW	1965–1971	124	18	
Malcolm Morrison	Scotland	FW				(Note: Morrison holds the record for most goals scored in a league season; 36 in 1938–39.)
David Muirhead	Scotland	DF	1996–2000	127	12	
Alan Neill	Scotland	DF	1995–1998	102	9	
Stephen Oates	Scotland	MF	2002–2009	124	4	
Ian Rennie	Scotland	DF	1978–1988	272	24	
Craig Renwick	Scotland	DF	1976–1983	139	6	
Archie Ritchie	Scotland	DF				
Brian Ross	Scotland	DF	1990–2000	201	3	
Gordon Russell	Scotland	DF	1986–2002	445	9	(Note: Russell holds the record of most Scottish Football League appearances for East Stirlingshire.)
Gordon Simpson	Scotland	DF	1967–1981	376	23	
Bobby Stein	Scotland	MF	1971–1977	205	14	
Jim Stirling	Scotland	DF	1973–1979	189	12	
Carl Thywissen	Norway	DF	2004–2008	115	5	
George Tulloch	Scotland	GK	1983–1988	103	0	
Derek Ure	Scotland	MF	2002–2011	296	29	
George Watson	Scotland	GK	1989–1993	107	0	
David Watt	Scotland	MF	1994–1998	122	22	
Dave Wilcox	Scotland	DF	1986–1990	109	15	
Gordon Wylde	Scotland	MF	1983–1988	124	5	
Stephen Adam	Scotland	DF	2006-2007	21	0	

== Key to positions ==
- GK — Goalkeeper
- DF — Defender
- MF — Midfielder
- FW — Forward
