= List of East Stirlingshire F.C. records and statistics =

East Stirlingshire F.C. is a Scottish association football club from Falkirk. The club was founded in 1881 joined the Scottish Football League in 1900.

This list encompasses the major honours won by East Stirlingshire, records set by the club, its managers and its players. The player records section includes details of the club's leading goalscorers and those who have made most appearances in first-team competitions. It also records notable achievements by East Stirlingshire players in international tournaments, and the highest transfer fees paid and received by the club. Attendance records at Firs Park, the club's home ground between 1921 and 2008, are also included in the list.

== Honours ==
League

- Division Two (before 1975) and First Division (after 1975):
  - Winners (1): 1931–32
  - Runners-up (1): 1962–63
- Division Three (1923 to 1926), Division C (1946 to 1949) and Second Division (after 1975):
  - Winners (1): 1947–48
  - Runners-up (2): 1923–24, 1979–80
  - Runners-up (3) : 2016–17 in Lowland Football League.

== Player records ==
=== Most appearances ===
Scottish Football League appearances from 1948 to 2013 only.

#	Name	Nationality	Position (Note: For a full description of positions see: Association football positions.)	East Stirlingshire career	League appearances	League goals	Notes
1	Gordon Russell	Scotland	DF	1986–2002	445	9	
2	Derek Ure	Scotland	MF	2002-2011, 2016-2018	400	33	
3	Gordon Simpson	Scotland	DF	1967-1981	376	23	
4	Jim Meakin	Scotland	MF	1969–1985	272	32	
5	Ian Rennie	Scotland	DF	1978–1988	272	24	
6	Bobby McCulley	Scotland	MF	1972–1991	268	30	
7	Arthur Hammill	Scotland	MF	1962–1971	266	39	
8	Tom Craig	Scotland	DF	1960–1968	259	0	
9	Charlie Kelly	Scotland	GK	1978–1990	222	1	
10	Tom Donnelly	Scotland	MF	1971–1978	216	26	

=== Goalscorers ===
- Most league goals in one season: 41, Andy Rodgers in the 2016–17 Lowland Football League.

=== International caps ===
- First capped player: Humphrey Jones for Wales against England on 23 February 1889.
- First capped player for Scotland: Archibald Ritchie against Wales on 21 March 1891.
- Most capped player: Humphrey Jones with 5 caps for Wales as an East Stirlingshire player.
- Most capped player for Scotland: David Alexander, 2 caps as an East Stirlingshire player.

=== Transfers ===
- Record transfer fee paid: £6,000 for Colin McKinnon from Falkirk, 1991.
- Record transfer fee received: £35,000 for Jim Docherty to Chelsea, 1978.

== Club records ==
=== Goals ===
- Most league goals scored in a season: 111 (in 38 matches in the 1931–32 season, Division Two).
- Fewest league goals scored in a season: 21 (in 22 matches in the 1911–12 season, Division Two).
- Most league goals conceded in a season: 121 (in 36 matches in the 1956–57 season, Division Two).
- Fewest league goals conceded in a season: 26 (in 22 matches in the 1947–48 season, Division C).

=== Points ===
- Most points in a season:
  - Two points for a win: 55 (in 38 matches in the 1931–32 season, Division Two).
  - Three points for a win: 67 (in 30 matches in the 2016–17 season, Scottish Lowland Football League).
- Fewest points in a season:
  - Two points for a win:
    - 12 (in 22 matches in the 1905–06 season, Division Two).
    - 12 (in 34 matches in the 1963–64 season, Division One).
  - Three points for a win:
    - 8 (in 36 matches in the 2003–04 season, Third Division).

=== Matches ===
==== Firsts ====
- First match as Britannia: Britannia 0–7 Falkirk 2nd XI, 4 December 1880.
- First match as East Stirlingshire: Falkirk 5–0 East Stirlingshire, 27 August 1881.
- First league match: East Stirlingshire 2–3 Airdrieonians, 18 August 1900.
- First Lowland Football League match: East Stirlingshire 2-2 Vale of Leithen, 6 August 2016.
- First Scottish Cup match: Milngavie Thistle 2–1 East Stirlingshire, September 1882.
- First Scottish League Cup match: East Stirlingshire 2–1 Kilmarnock, 11 September 1948.
- First Scottish Challenge Cup match: Queen of the South 5–0 East Stirlingshire, 16 October 1990.

==== Record wins ====
- Record Scottish Football League win: 8–0 (against Arthurlie, 27 August 1927).
- Record Scottish Football League away win: 6–0 (against Bo'ness, 24 January 1921; and against Berwick Rangers, 10 September 1955).
- Record Scottish Cup win:
  - 10–1 (against Stenhousemuir, 1 September 1888);
  - 11–2 (against Vale of Bannock, 22 September 1888).
- Record Scottish League Cup win:
  - 4–0 (against Cowdenbeath, 1 September 1976);
  - 5–1 (against Berwick Rangers, 31 August 1957; and against Montrose, 15 August 1959);
  - 6–2 (against East Fife, 4 September 1965).
- Record Lowland Football League win: 10-1 (against Gala Fairydean Rovers, Saturday 3 December 2016).
- Record Scottish Challenge Cup win: 4–0 (against Stenhousemuir, 12 September 2000).
- Record win in any match: 17–0 (against Carron, Stirlingshire Cup, 18 October 1884).

==== Record defeats ====
- Record Scottish Football League defeat: 1–12 (against Dundee United, 13 April 1936).
- Record Scottish Cup defeat: 2–10 (against Renton, 4 April 1884).
- Record Scottish League Cup defeat: 2–9 (against Albion Rovers, 18 August 1956).
- Record Scottish Challenge Cup defeat: 0–7 (against St Mirren, 6 August 2002).

=== Record consecutive results ===
- Record consecutive league wins: 8 (from 14 November 2009 to 10 February 2010).
- Record consecutive league defeats: 24 (from 8 November 2003 to 8 May 2004).
- Record consecutive league games without a defeat: 17 (from 19 November 2017 to 31 March 2018).
- Record consecutive league games without a win: 26 (from 8 February 2003 to 25 October 2003).

=== Attendances ===
- Highest attendance at Firs Park:
  - Scottish Cup game: 12,000 (against Partick Thistle, 19 February 1921).
  - League game: 10,000 (against St Mirren, 16 November 1935).
