= Phil Cannie =

Scottish footballer

Personal information
- Full name: Phillip Cannie
- Date of birth: 12 November 1977 (age 48)
- Place of birth: Greenock, Scotland
- Position: Striker

Team information
- Current team: Gourock Amateurs

Senior career*
Years	Team	Apps	(Gls)
1998–2000	Port Glasgow		
2000–2001	Clyde	15	(2)
2001–2002	Pollok		
2002–2010	Greenock Morton	57	(7)
2001	Kilwinning Rangers		
- Kirkintilloch Rob Roy
- Maryhill
- Neilston
- Johnstone Burgh
- Largs Thistle
- Sporting Larkfield (A)
- Gourock Amateurs
- * Club domestic league appearances and goals as of 09:12, 11 August 2009 (UTC)

Phillip Cannie (born 12 November 1977 in Greenock), is a Scottish football striker who plays for Scottish amateur side Sporting Larkfield F.C.

Cannie began his career with Port Glasgow, and stepped up to the senior game with Clyde in the summer of 2000. He scored on his Clyde debut, in a 2-1 Scottish Challenge Cup defeat against Ross County. He also scored on his league debut the following month against Airdrie, but he found first team chances limited at Broadwood Stadium, and left in March 2001, after scoring 3 goals in 16 appearances.

He went back to the juniors with Pollok, before joining his hometown team Greenock Morton. He stayed at Cappielow for just over two years, before returning to the junior leagues to play for Kilwinning Rangers, Kirkintilloch Rob Roy, Maryhill, Neilston, Johnstone Burgh and finally Largs Thistle. He now plays amateur football for Scottish amateur side Gourock Amateurs.
