= Brian Ross =

Brian or Bryan Ross may refer to:

- Brian Ross (curler), Canadian curler
- Brian Ross (footballer) (born 1967), Scottish football player and manager
- Brian Ross (racing driver) (born 1962), American race car driver
- Brian Ross (journalist) (born 1948), former American investigative correspondent for ABC News
- Brian Ross (singer) (born 1954), British vocalist for heavy metal bands Blitzkrieg and Satan
- CJ Mac (Bryan Ross, born 1969), American rapper and actor
