= Ronnie Lowrie =

Scottish footballer

Personal information
- Full name: Ronald Lowrie
- Date of birth: 5 March 1955 (age 71)
- Place of birth: Aberdeen, Scotland
- Position: Goalkeeper

Youth career
- St Roch's

Senior career*
Years	Team	Apps	(Gls)
1972	Clydebank	2	(0)
1972–1973	St Roch's		
1973–1974	Queen's Park	28	(0)
1974	→ Notts County (loan)	0	(0)
1974	→ Hamilton Academical (loan)	1	(0)
1974	Stranraer	1	(0)
–1975	Blantyre Victoria		
1975–1979	Rangers	0	(0)
1979–1984	Baillieston Juniors		
1984–1991	Alloa Athletic	246	(0)
1991	Partick Thistle	1	(0)
- Pollok

International career
1974	Scotland Amateurs	2	(0)
1979–1982	Scotland Juniors	9	(0)

Managerial career
- 1999–2004: Pollok
- * Club domestic league appearances and goals

Ronald Lowrie (born 5 March 1955) is a retired professional Scottish footballer and manager. He made over 240 appearances as a goalkeeper in the Scottish League for Alloa Athletic between 1984 and 1991 and also played league football for Queen's Park, Clydebank, Hamilton Academical and Partick Thistle. He was capped by Scotland at amateur and junior level. He had a five-year career in management in junior football with Pollok, his final club as a player.

== Personal life ==
As of May 2007, Lowrie was physical education teacher at Barrhead High School.

== Honours ==
Alloa Athletic

- Scottish League Second Division second place promotion: 1988–89

Pollok

- Scottish Junior Cup: 1996–97
