= Stuart Davidson (footballer) =

Scottish footballer and manager

Personal information
- Date of birth: 3 August 1979 (age 47)
- Place of birth: Glasgow, Scotland
- Position: Midfielder

Team information
- Current team: Largs Thistle (manager)

Youth career
- Glasgow City BC

Senior career*
Years	Team	Apps	(Gls)
1995–2001	Kilmarnock	4	(0)
2000	→ Queen of the South (loan)	2	(0)
2000	→ Alloa Athletic (loan)	3	(0)
2000	→ Queen of the South (loan)	9	(0)
2001	→ Airdrieonians (loan)	5	(0)
2001–2002	Queen of the South	16	(2)
2002–2003	Troon		
2003–2011	Auchinleck Talbot		
2012	Neilston Juniors		
2012–2015	Kilbirnie Ladeside		
2015–2016	Largs Thistle		
Total		39	(2)

Managerial career
- 2016–: Largs Thistle
- * Club domestic league appearances and goals as of 23:40, 11 October 2016 (UTC)

Stuart Davidson (born 3 August 1979) is a Scottish former professional footballer who is the manager of Largs Thistle in the Scottish Junior Football Association, West Region. He has previously played in the Scottish Premier League for Kilmarnock.

== Career ==
A tough tackling midfielder nicknamed Arnie, Davidson began his professional career with Kilmarnock. Davidson was given his Scottish Premier League debut by Bobby Williamson in September 1999 versus Celtic, before going out on loan periods at several Scottish Football League clubs, including two spells at Queen of the South. Davidson joined the Dumfries club on a permanent deal in the 2001 close season and his sixteen league appearances the following season earned him a league winners medal as Queens won the Scottish Football League Second Division title.

After moving into Junior football with Troon, Davidson then joined Auchinleck Talbot and enjoyed a successful eight years with the club, winning the Scottish Junior Cup twice, including a man-of-the-match performance in the 2009 final when he scored the winning goal versus Clydebank.

Davidson joined Neilston Juniors in 2012, after a short period out of the game, before his appointment as player-coach at Kilbirnie Ladeside later that year. Former Talbot team-mate Bryan Slavin attracted him to Largs Thistle as his assistant manager in January 2015 and Davidson succeeded him in the role after Slavin's resignation in October 2016.
