= Jim George =

Jim George may refer to:

- Jim George (footballer) (active 1970s and 1980s), Scottish football player and manager
- Jim George (rugby union), English rugby union player
- Jim George (weightlifter) (born 1935), American Olympic weightlifter
- Jim George (author) (born 1943), American author

== See also ==
- Jimmy George (disambiguation)
- James George (disambiguation)
