= Jimmy George (disambiguation) =

Jimmy George (1955–1987) was an Indian volleyball player.

Jimmy George may also refer to:

- Jimmy George (musician) (born 1940), American musician
- Jimmy George (band)
- Jimmy George Indoor Stadium

== See also ==
- Jim George (disambiguation)
- James George (disambiguation)
