= Ian Spittal =

Scottish footballer

Personal information
- Date of birth: 14 February 1965 (age 61)
- Place of birth: Glasgow, Scotland
- Position: Defender

Senior career*
Years	Team	Apps	(Gls)
1986–1989	Partick Thistle	41	(0)
1989–1994	Stranraer	144	(3)
1994–1995	Arbroath	25	(0)
1995–1998	Pollok		
1998–1999	Clyde	42	(2)
Total		252	(5)
- * Club domestic league appearances and goals

Ian Spittal (born 14 February 1965 in Glasgow), is a Scottish former footballer. He was a defender.

Spittal began his career with Partick Thistle, and went on to have spells at Stranraer and Arbroath. Spittal then joined junior side Pollok, before returning to the senior game with Clyde, signing along with 10 other players plucked from the junior ranks. Spittal was quickly appointed captain, a position which he held until his early retirement from football in November 1999 due to an eye injury. He was appointed coach of the Clyde reserve team, before returning to Pollok in 2001 as a coach.
