= George James =

George James may refer to:

- George James (soldier) (1760–1811), colonel of the Royal Northumberland Fusiliers
- George James (footballer) (1899–1976), English footballer
- George James (musician) (1906–1995), American jazz saxophonist
- George James (physician) (1915–1972), American physician and administrator
- George James Jr. (1927–2008), American football coach
- George G. M. James (1893–1956), Guyanese writer
- George C. James (born 1960), American lawyer and judge
- George K. James (1904–1994), American football head coach at Cornell University
- George Payne Rainsford James (1799–1860), novelist and historical writer
- George Wharton James (1858–1923), lecturer, photographer, journalist

== See also ==
- George & James, a 1984 album by The Residents
- James George (disambiguation)
