= Billy Henry =

Scottish footballer

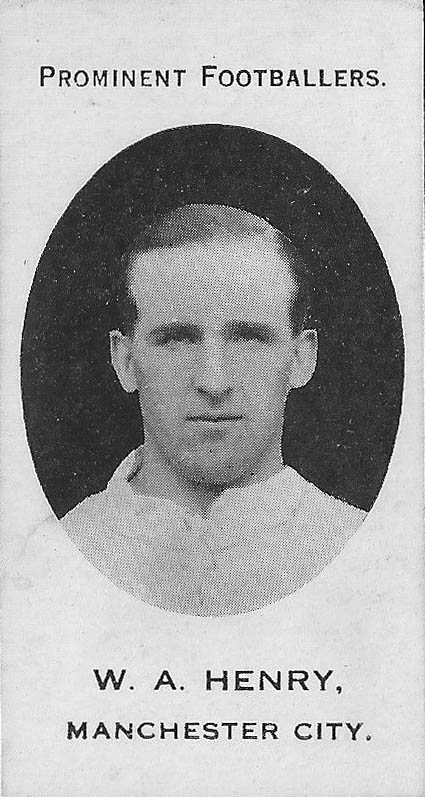

Personal information
- Full name: William Armstrong Henry
- Date of birth: 6 September 1884
- Place of birth: Glasgow, Scotland
- Date of death: c. 1960 (aged 75–76)
- Position: Right back

Senior career*
Years	Team	Apps	(Gls)
1905–1906	Blantyre Victoria		
1906–1908	Rangers	31	(0)
1908–1909	Falkirk	20	(0)
1909–1911	Leicester Fosse	89	(0)
1911–1920	Manchester City	143	(1)
- St Bernard's
- * Club domestic league appearances and goals

William Armstrong Henry (6 September 1884 — after 1960) was a Scottish professional footballer who played as a right back for Rangers, Falkirk, Leicester City and Manchester City.

== Career ==
Henry was born in Glasgow and began his football career in Scotland with Rangers and then Falkirk before transferring to Leicester City in England in September 1909. He played 96 times for Leicester before Manchester City purchased him for £1,000 in 1911, the highest fee that Leicester City had received for one of their players at the time. He made his Manchester City debut in a 1–1 draw against Sunderland in November 1911. He went on to make 157 appearances for Manchester City in which he scored one goal. The war hindered his outings for City but he did spend eight years there, the majority of his career. He never got a first-team cap for Scotland, but did get international honours in a military game between England and Scotland at Everton's Goodison Park ground.

== Personal life ==
Henry served in the 5th Cavalry Reserve Regiment during the First World War.
