= Craig Brown (footballer, born 1971) =

Scottish footballer

Personal information
- Date of birth: 23 September 1971 (age 55)
- Place of birth: Greenock, Scotland
- Position: Midfielder

Youth career
- Ferguslie United

Senior career*
Years	Team	Apps	(Gls)
1988–1994	Greenock Morton	16	(0)
1994–1995	Stranraer	0	(0)
1996–1998	Largs Thistle		
1998–2004	Port Glasgow		
Total		16	(0)

Managerial career
- 2008–2017: Port Glasgow
- * Club domestic league appearances and goals as of 13:27, 21 February 2018 (UTC)

Craig Brown (born 23 September 1971), is a former professional footballer who has played in the Scottish Football League First Division for Greenock Morton.

== Career ==
Brown began his career with Greenock Morton, under the management of Allan McGraw. He made his debut at the age of seventeen in May 1998 against Raith Rovers, and made a total of twenty league and cup appearances for the club before being released in 1994. A subsequent spell at Stranraer was plagued by injury which eventually forced Brown to retire from the professional game.

Resuming his playing career at Junior level with Largs Thistle after around eighteen months out, Brown later moved on to Port Glasgow. Injuries finally forced Brown to end playing after six seasons with the Undertakers, but he rejoined the club as manager at the end of 2008. Work commitments led Brown to resign as Port Glasgow boss in July 2017, having led the club to promotion in his final season in charge.
