= Largs Thistle F.C. =

Association football club in North Ayrshire, Scotland

Largs Thistle
- Full name: Largs Thistle Football Club
- Nickname: The Theesel
- Founded: 1889
- Ground: Barrfields Park, Largs
- Capacity: 4,500
- Coordinates: 55.801021°N 4.865992°W
- Chair: Alistair McMaster
- Manager: Stuart Davidson
- League: Lowland League West
- 2025–26: West of Scotland League Premier Division, 4th of 16 (promoted)
- Website: http://largsthistle.info
Home colours	Away colours

Largs Thistle Football Club are a Scottish football club, based in the town of Largs, North Ayrshire. Nicknamed The Theesel, they were formed in 1889 and play at Barrfields Park. Currently playing in the Lowland League West, they wear gold and black strips. Their main rivals are Beith Juniors and Kilbirnie Ladeside.

The team are managed since October 2016 by Stuart Davidson, who stepped up from his co-management role following the resignation of Bryan Slavin.

== History ==
In the 1993–94 season, Largs Thistle lifted the Scottish Junior Cup beating Glenafton Athletic 1–0 in the final at Ibrox Stadium on 15 May 1994. Largs won the match in front of 8,000 spectators and claimed their first Scottish Junior Cup.

In the 2009–10 season, Largs again reached the final of the Scottish Junior Cup, however this time losing 1–0 to Linlithgow Rose at Rugby Park on 23 May 2010. The following season Largs achieved their highest position in the West Premier Division by finishing fifth place. Largs' third appearance in the Scottish Junior Cup final came in 2018–19, when they lost 0–2 to Auchinleck Talbot at New Douglas Park on 2 June 2019.

== Stadium ==
Barrfields Park has been the home of Largs Thistle F.C. since 1930. The stadium first opened on 21 July 1930, with crowds of over 9,000 attending the first scheduled events. The surface was upgraded to an all-weather 3G pitch in August 2012.

== Current squad ==
Note: Flags indicate national team as defined under FIFA eligibility rules; some limited exceptions apply. Players may hold more than one non-FIFA nationality.

No.	Pos.	Nation	Player
—	GK	SCO	Adam Strain
—	GK	SCO	George O'Connor
—	DF	SCO	Conor Bradley
—	DF	SCO	Corrie Fellows (on loan from Kelty Hearts)
—	DF	SCO	Creag Little
—	DF	SCO	Kieran Brady
—	DF	SCO	Fraser Rodger
—	DF	SCO	Laurie McMaster
—	DF	SCO	Cory Hughes (Captain)
—	DF	SCO	Sean McLeod
—	DF	SCO	Josh Gilmour

No.	Pos.	Nation	Player
—	MF	SCO	Liam Lapsley
—	MF	SCO	Blair Devine
—	MF	SCO	Lewis Davidson
—	MF	SCO	Liam McVey
—	MF	SCO	Adam Aird
—	MF	SCO	David McGrath
—	MF	SCO	Christopher Callander
—	MF	SCO	Ross Urquhart
—	FW	SCO	David Ramsay
—	FW	SCO	Jamie Martin
—	FW	SCO	Nicky Little
—	FW	SCO	Travis Stracey
—	FW	ENG	William Sewell

== Non-playing staff ==
Name	Role
(Scotland) Alistair McMaster	Chairman
(Scotland) Kenneth Smailes	Club Secretary
(Scotland) Stuart Davidson	Manager
(Scotland) Kevin Struthers	Assistant Manager
(Scotland) Andy Scott	Coach

== Notable former players ==
- Gordon McQueen - Scotland, Leeds United, Manchester United, St Mirren
- (Scotland) Tommy Turner - St Mirren, Partick Thistle, St Johnstone, Greenock Morton, Gretna
- (Scotland) Jimmy Frizzell - Greenock Morton, Oldham Athletic
- (Scotland) Phil Bonnyman - Rangers, Hamilton Academical, Carlisle United, Chesterfield, Grimsby Town
- (Scotland) Crawford Boyd - Queen of the South, Hearts
- (Scotland) Derek Grierson - Queen's Park, Rangers, Falkirk, Arbroath
- (Scotland) Tommy Halliday - Dumbarton, Cardiff City, Stranraer
- (Scotland) William Kinniburgh - Motherwell, Ayr United, Partick Thistle, Clyde
- (Scotland) Phil Cannie - Greenock Morton, Clyde
- (Scotland) Davie Elliott - Ayr United, Dumbarton, East Fife
- (Scotland) Jackie Rafferty - Dumbarton, Partick Thistle
- (Scotland) Dougie McCracken - Ayr United, Dumbarton, East Fife
- (Scotland) Johnny McIntyre - Clydebank
- (Scotland) Ryan McWilliams - Greenock Morton, East Stirlingshire
- (Scotland) Steve Morrison - Dunfermline Athletic, Dumbarton, Clyde, Alloa Athletic, Clydebank, East Stirling
- (Scotland) Rashid Sarwar - Kilmarnock
- (Scotland) Kenny Meechan - Dumbarton
- (Scotland) Andrew Kean
- (Scotland) Craig Brown - Greenock Morton, Port Glasgow
- (Australia) Joe Knowles - Perth Glory
- (Democratic Republic of the Congo) Joel Kasubandi - Greenock Morton

== Notable former managers and coaches ==
- (Scotland) Phil Bonnyman - Rangers, Hamilton Academical, Carlisle United, Chesterfield, Grimsby Town
- Erik Sørensen - Denmark, Rangers, Greenock Morton
- (Scotland) Jim George - Dumbarton, St Johnstone, East Fife
- (Scotland) Bobby Lawrie - Partick Thistle, Stranraer
- (Scotland) David McKellar - Derby County, Carlisle United, Hamilton Academical, Rangers
- (Scotland) Bryan Slavin - Greenock Morton
- (Scotland) Stephen Swift - Cowdenbeath, Linlithgow Rose, Stranraer, Irvine Meadow, BSC Glasgow
- (Scotland) Tom Spence - Stirling Albion, East Fife, Albion Rovers

== Honours ==
- Scottish Junior Cup
  - Winners: 1993–94
  - Runners-up: 2009–10, 2018–19
- SJFA West Super League First Division
  - Winners: 2008–09
  - Runners-up: 2015–16
- West Region Ayrshire League
  - Winners: 2004–05
- West of Scotland Cup
  - Winners: 1990–91
- Ayrshire Weekly Press Cup
  - Winners: 2012–13

=== Other honours ===
- Ayrshire Second Division winners: 1983–84, 1993–94, 2001–02
- North Ayrshire Cup: 2005–06
- Ardrossan & Saltcoats Herald Cup: 1922–23, 1956–57, 1958–59
- Western League North Division: 1955–56
- Ayrshire League (Kerr & Smith) Cup: 1924–25, 1957–58
- Ayrshire District (Irvine Times) Cup: 1895–96, 1956–57
