= James George =

James George may refer to:

- James Z. George (1826–1897), American military officer, lawyer, writer, and politician
- James George (academic) (1801–1870), acting Principal of Queen's University, 1853–1857
- James George (diplomat) (1918–2020), Canadian ambassador to the United Arab Emirates
- James George (weightlifter), American weightlifter
- James George (colonel), commander of the 2nd Minnesota Infantry Regiment during the American Civil War
- James George (writer) (born 1962), New Zealand writer

== See also ==
- Jim George (disambiguation)
- Jimmy George (disambiguation)
- Jamie George (born 1990), English rugby union player
- George James (disambiguation)
