= Gavin Friels =

Scottish footballer

Personal information
- Full name: Gavin David Friels
- Date of birth: 3 August 1977 (age 49)
- Place of birth: Irvine, Scotland
- Position: Forward

Team information
- Current team: Ardrossan Winton Rovers (Manager)

Youth career
- Bonnyton Thistle BC

Senior career*
Years	Team	Apps	(Gls)
1995–1996	Queen of the South	0	(0)
1996	Dalry Thistle		
1996–1999	Stranraer	31	(17)
1997–1998	→ Dalry Thistle (loan)		
1999–2004	Auchinleck Talbot		
1999–2000	Albion Rovers	1	(20)
2004–2006	Pollok		(17)
2006–2007	Ayr United	10	(1)
2006	→ Glenafton Athletic (loan)		
2007	Auchinleck Talbot		
2007–2011	Irvine Meadow		
2011–2012	Cumnock Juniors		
2012–2013	Kilbirnie Ladeside		
2013–????	Dalry Thistle		
- * Club domestic league appearances and goals

Gavin Friels (born 3 August 1977) is a Scottish football forward who is manager of Ardrossan Winton Rovers in the West of Scotland League Premier Division. He has previously played in the Scottish Football League First Division with Ayr United and Stranraer.

== Career ==
Friels started his career with Queen of the South but did not make any league appearances for the club. He dropped to Junior level at his hometown side Dalry Thistle before moving to Stranraer in December 1996. With the Galloway club, Friels won the Scottish Football League Second Division championship in 1997–1998 and the following season made 19 appearances in the Scottish Football League First Division, scoring once in a 7–1 defeat to Ayr United in September 1998. Friels left Stranraer for Junior side Auchinleck Talbot in the summer of 1999.

After scoring two goals against Maryhill on the final day of the season to help save Talbot from relegation in 2004, Friels moved on to Pollok the following season. During his time at 'Lok, Friels was capped for the Scotland Junior international team in the 2005 Quadrangular Tournament. He stepped up to the Scottish Football League again for a short spell with Ayr United in 2006 but was soon back in the Juniors, firstly on loan to Glenafton Athletic in November 2006 then permanently to Auchinleck Talbot in February 2007 after being released by Ayr. Friels failed to settle at Talbot a second time and joined Irvine Meadow in November 2007.

Friels was out of the game for a period of fourteen months following an injury suffered in a game against Arthurlie in January 2009, returning to action in March 2010. The player joined Cumnock Juniors in February 2011 before signing for Kilbirnie Ladeside in 2012.

Friels was announced as player-manager of Dalry Thistle in March 2013.
