= Davie Colquhoun =

Scottish footballer

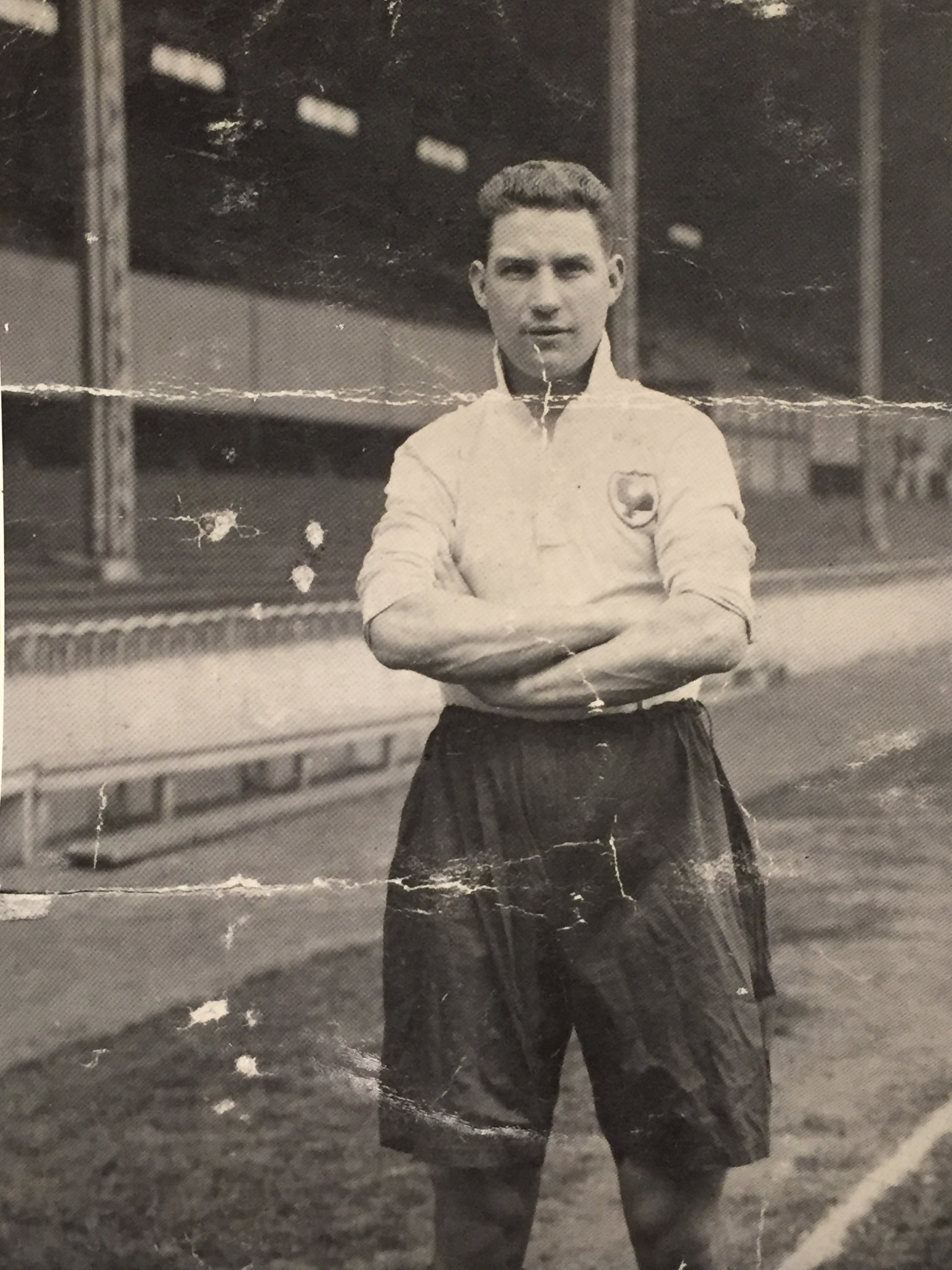
- Colquhoun at White Hart Lane in the 1930s

Personal information
- Full name: David Wison Colquhoun
- Date of birth: 9 January 1906
- Place of birth: Motherwell, Scotland
- Date of death: 1983 (aged 76–77)
- Position: Right half

Senior career*
Years	Team	Apps	(Gls)
- Blantyre Victoria
1925–1931	St Mirren	125	(3)
1931–1934	Tottenham Hotspur	81	(2)
1934–1935	Luton Town	16	(0)
1936	Rochdale	0	(0)
- * Club domestic league appearances and goals

David Wilson Colquhoun (9 January 1906 – 1983) was a Scottish professional footballer who played for Blantyre Victoria, St Mirren, Tottenham Hotspur, Luton Town and Rochdale.

== Football career ==
Colquhoun began his playing career at Blantyre Victoria before joining St Mirren. In 1931 the right half signed for Tottenham Hotspur where he featured in 87 matches and scored twice in all competitions between 1931 and 1934. He joined Luton Town in 1934 and made a further 16 appearances before ending his career at Rochdale.

== Personal life ==
He had five children Ann, Flora (known as Fay), Margaret, Willis (known as Bill), and George.
