= Kevin Budinauckas =

Scottish footballer

Personal information
- Full name: Kevin Budinauckas
- Date of birth: 16 September 1974 (age 52)
- Place of birth: Bellshill, Scotland
- Height: 5 ft 10 in (1.78 m)
- Position: Goalkeeper

Youth career
- –1998: Partick Thistle

Senior career*
Years	Team	Apps	(Gls)
1998–1999	Stenhousemuir	2	(0)
1999–2000	Partick Thistle	34	(0)
2000–2002	Clyde	12	(0)
2002–2004	Partick Thistle	7	(0)
2003–2004	→ Brechin City (loan)	16	(0)
2006–2007	Stranraer	7	(?)
- * Club domestic league appearances and goals as of 12:25, 13 March 2009 (UTC)

Kevin Budinauckas (born 16 September 1974 in Bellshill) is a Scottish former footballer, who played as a goalkeeper.

Throughout his career he has played for Stenhousemuir, Partick Thistle, Clyde, Brechin City on loan and Stranraer in the senior game.

He also had a couple of spells in junior football at Wishaw and Linlithgow Rose, Cumnock, Pollok and Armadale.

Budinauckas is currently the goalkeeping coach at Stirling Albion.

== Personal life ==
Kevin's two sons, Lewis and Kyle Budinauckas, are goalkeepers too. They are both on the books at Rangers FC.
