= Johnny McIntyre (footballer, born 1956) =

Scottish footballer

Personal information
- Date of birth: 7 July 1956 (age 70)
- Place of birth: Greenock, Scotland
- Position: Right winger

Senior career*
Years	Team	Apps	(Gls)
- Largs Thistle
1978–1981	Clydebank	28	(1)
- AS Cherbourg
- Leven
- Oakley United
- * Club domestic league appearances and goals

Johnny McIntyre (born 7 July 1956) is a Scottish former professional footballer who played as a right winger.

== Career ==
Born in Greenock, McIntyre played in his native Scotland for Largs Thistle, Clydebank, Leven and Oakley United, as well as in France for AS Cherbourg.
