= Ian Steen =

Scottish footballer

Personal information
- Date of birth: 30 December 1954 (age 71)
- Place of birth: Dundee, Scotland
- Position: Forward

Youth career
- Blackpool

Senior career*
Years	Team	Apps	(Gls)
1972–1974	Dundee United	3	(0)
1975–1976	Forfar Athletic	24	(1)
1976–1979	Stranraer	98	(6)
1979–1983	Raith Rovers	72	(5)
1983–1985	East Stirlingshire	63	(0)
Total		260	(12)
- * Club domestic league appearances and goals

Ian Steen (born 30 December 1954) is a Scottish former footballer who played as a forward.

== Career ==
Steen began his professional career in 1972 with Dundee United but managed just three league appearances before moving to Forfar Athletic in 1975. Steen's single season at Station Park preceded a move to Stranraer, where he spent three years and made just under 100 league appearances. A 1979 move to Raith Rovers brought four years of football in Fife before Steen ended his career with a two-year spell at East Stirlingshire.

After leaving professional football, Steen moved to England for work reasons and played non-league football. He now lives in Peterborough with his wife and two teenage daughters and works in the printing industry.
