= Steve Morrison (footballer) =

Scottish footballer and manager

Personal information
- Full name: Steven Morrison
- Date of birth: 15 August 1961 (age 65)
- Place of birth: St Andrews, Scotland
- Position: Midfielder

Senior career*
Years	Team	Apps	(Gls)
1978–1981	Aberdeen	0	(0)
1981–1988	Dunfermline Athletic	244	(42)
1988–1989	Hamilton Academical	29	(7)
1989–1991	Dumbarton	54	(37)
1991–1994	Clyde	78	(15)
1994	Alloa Athletic	5	(0)
1994–1995	Larne	15	(0)
1995–1996	Alloa Athletic	26	(2)
- Ardrossan Winton Rovers
1996–1998	Clydebank	7	(0)
1998–2000	Largs Thistle		
Total		458	(78)

Managerial career
- 2000: Clydebank
- 2003–2004: East Stirlingshire
- * Club domestic league appearances and goals

Steve Morrison (born 15 August 1961) is a Scottish former footballer and manager. His most recent role was as manager of East Stirlingshire in the Scottish Football League Third Division from 2003 to 2004. He was assisted by former Rangers and Everton defender Alex Cleland.

Morrison replaced Danny Divers, whom he had previously assisted, in March 2003. He was succeeded by Dennis Newell following his resignation in April 2004 after failing to get the Shire off the bottom of the league.

He also had an eight-month stint as manager at Clydebank. As a player, he played in midfield for numerous Scottish clubs, most notably Dunfermline Athletic.
