= Stephen Adam (footballer, born 1986) =

Scottish footballer (born 1986)

Personal information
- Date of birth: 10 November 1986 (age 39)
- Place of birth: Scotland
- Position: Defender

Youth career
- Livingston

Senior career*
Years	Team	Apps	(Gls)
2003–2006	Livingston	7	(0)
2006	→ Raith Rovers (loan)	7	(1)
2006–2007	East Stirling	21	(0)
2007–?	Craigielea Star		
- * Club domestic league appearances and goals

Stephen Adam (born 10 November 1986) is a Scottish former professional footballer who played as a defender for East Stirling and Livingston.

== Club career ==
=== Livingston ===
Adam was a product of the youth academy at Livingston and shared a dressing room with Robert Snodgrass who went on to play for Scotland and West Ham United. Chances were few and far between for him at Livi, who were enjoying perhaps their most successful spell ever, finishing 3rd in the Scottish Premier League in 2001–02, qualifying for UEFA Europa League and winning the Scottish League Cup in 2003–04.

The defender made his debut for Livi in a 3–1 win against Kilmarnock at Rugby Park on 27 November 2004.

=== Raith Rovers ===
He signed for Raith Rovers on loan in 2006 and made his league debut for the club in a 1–0 win against Forfar on 4 February 2006.

=== East Stirling and Craigielea Star ===
Adam signed for East Stirling in 2006 and made his debut in a 4–1 Scottish League Cup defeat away to Cowdenbeath on 8 August 2006.

He last played for Craiglea Star in 2007.
