= Danny Diver =

Scottish footballer and manager

Danny Diver (born 15 November 1966, in Paisley) is a Scottish former football player and manager. He is known for his dispute with the Belgian club R.R.C. Tournaisien in the late 1980s in connection with player registration contributed to the later legal framework for the Bosman ruling.

== Playing career ==
- (Scotland) St Mirren (1982–84)
- (Denmark) Kolding IF (1984)
- (Scotland) Motherwell (1984–85) 0 apps 0 goals
- (Scotland) Morton (1985–86) 4 apps 1 goal
- (Belgium) RC Tournai (1986–88)
- (Scotland) Albion Rovers (1988–89) 22 apps 3 goals
- (Scotland) East Stirlingshire (1989–92) 84 apps 28 goals
- (Scotland) Stranraer (1992–93) 30 apps 15 goals
- (Scotland) Arbroath (1993) 21 apps 10 goals
- (Scotland) Alloa Athletic (1993–96) 46 apps 9 goals
- (Scotland) Hamilton Academical (1996) 4 apps 0 goals
- (Scotland) Ayr United (1996) 9 apps 4 goals
- (Scotland) Pollok (1996–98)
- (Scotland) Maryhill Juniors (1998–99)
- (Scotland) Shotts Bon Accord (1999-00)
- (Scotland) Shettleston (2000–01)
- (Scotland) Neilston Juniors (2001–02)
- (Scotland) East Stirlingshire (2002–03) 1 app 0 goals

== Coaching career ==
Diver served as the manager of Scottish Third Division club East Stirlingshire. Diver resigned from this position in March 2003 and was replaced by Steve Morrison, his former assistant.

Since then Daniel has picked up tennis and has exceeded expectations making the 2nd team at stewarton tennis club be promoted. Cmon boys.
