= Laurie Binnie =

Scottish footballer and manager (1917–1991)

Personal information
- Full name: Lawrence Binnie
- Date of birth: 17 December 1917
- Place of birth: Falkirk, Scotland
- Date of death: 20 February 1991 (aged 73)
- Place of death: Falkirk, Scotland
- Position: Wing half

Senior career*
Years	Team	Apps	(Gls)
1938–1939	Camelon Juniors		
1939–1940	Chesterfield	0	(0)
1946–1947	Mansfield Town	20	(0)
Total		20	(0)

Managerial career
- 1966: East Stirlingshire
- * Club domestic league appearances and goals

Lawrence Binnie (17 December 1917 – 20 February 1991) was a Scottish professional football player and manager who played in the Football League for Mansfield Town.

Binnie was appointed as the first ever manager of East Stirlingshire in August 1966, but left four months later having won only one of nineteen league matches.
