= Newlandsfield Park =

Stadium in Glasgow City, Scotland

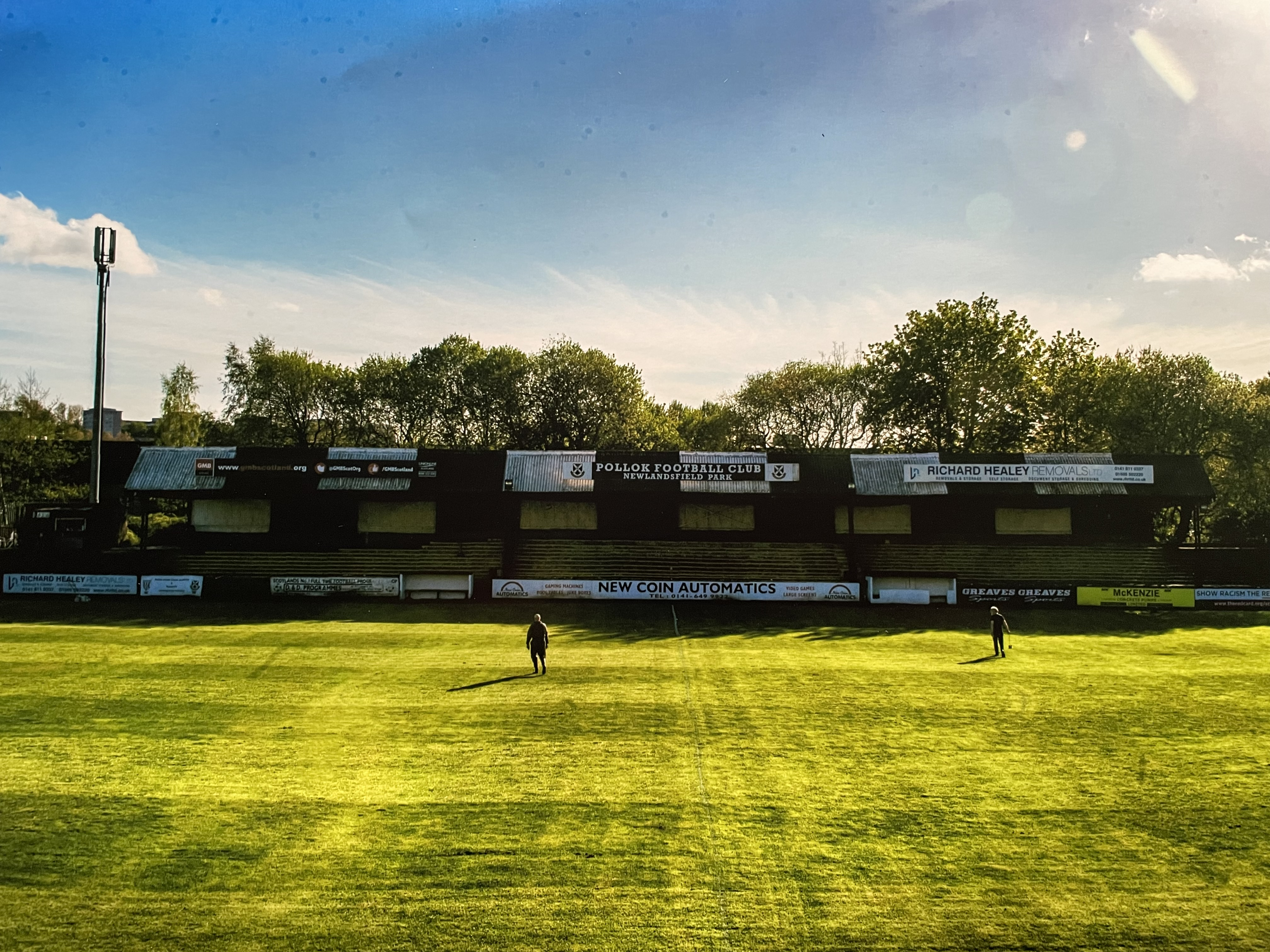

- Location within Glasgow council area
- Location: Newlands, Glasgow, Scotland
- Coordinates: 55.8239°N 4.2879°W
- Owner: Pollok F.C.
- Capacity: 2088
- Surface: Grass
- Record attendance: 15,000 (approximately)

Construction
- Opened: 1928

Tenant
- Pollok F.C.

Newlandsfield Park is a football ground in Newlands, a Southern suburb of Glasgow, Scotland. It is the home ground of West of Scotland Football League side Pollok F.C.

== History ==
Pollok's first ground was at Haggs Park in the Pollok Estate, but they were forced to move out in 1926–1927 as Glasgow City Council wanted the land for school pitches. After playing temporarily at Rosebery Park and the Queen Mary Tea Gardens at Spiersbridge (in Thornliebank), they acquired Newlandsfield Park, and began playing there in the 1928–1929 season. The pavilion and much of the club's equipment was destroyed by fire at the start of the Second World War and it was not until the conflict's end, that a new stone pavilion was constructed. The stadium's record attendance was believed to have been achieved at the 1945 Scottish Junior Cup quarter final replay against Fauldhouse United, which saw the 'Lok triumph 3–1 in front of 15,000 spectators, with many watching the match from the platform of the nearby Pollokshaws East railway station.

In 1948, the club were given notice to vacate the ground and after being refused a bank loan, the Pollokshaws Co-Operative Society loaned them the funds to purchase the ground. The current pavilion and terrace roof were built in the 1970s, with the Pollok Social Club opening in 1971. This proved to be a popular social spot in Shawlands for over twenty years, until it was sold and reopened as Loks Bar and Kitchen in 2014.

In January 2022, the club received planning permission to install floodlights at Newlandsfield as part of their application for SFA membership. After a significant fundraising effort from supporters, these were installed and switched on for the first time in April 2022. The first match played under the lights was a 1–0 victory against Clydebank in the WoSFL Cup quarter final in May 2022. During the same season, the club installed toilets and a new disabled shelter behind the clubhouse side goal.

In October 2022, Newlandsfield played host to a full team of BBC Scotland cameras, who were there to cover Pollok's 4-3 win against Annan Athletic in the Scottish Cup Second Round.

The ground features in Leon Gladwell's book "European Football's Greatest Grounds', coming in at 93rd and being described as "the perfect small inner-city football ground."
