= Blantyre Victoria F.C. =

Association football club in Scotland

Blantyre Victoria
- Full name: Blantyre Victoria Football Club
- Nicknames: The Vics, The best
- Founded: 1890
- Ground: KG Stadium, Blantyre
- Capacity: 2,500
- Coordinates: 55°47′34″N 4°5′1″W
- Manager: John Gibson
- League: West of Scotland League First Division
- 2025–26: West of Scotland League Second Division, 4th of 16 (promoted)
Home colours	Away colours

Blantyre Victoria Football Club, also known as Blantyre Vics, are a Scottish association football club based in the town of Blantyre, South Lanarkshire. Formed in 1889, they play at KG Stadium (traditionally known as Castle Park). They currently compete in the West of Scotland Football League First Division in the seventh tier of the Scottish football league system. Historically, they shared a healthy rivalry with Blantyre Celtic who played nearby at Craighead Park, until Celtic were dissolved in 1992. The team have been managed since June 2016 by former Alloa and Stirling Albion midfielder John Gibson.

== History ==
=== Early days ===
Blantyre Victoria were founded in 1890 by a Mr Sam Dawson, who remained working with the club until his death in 1929. When they were founded, they initially had no permanent ground so played on Glasgow Road in Blantyre. They became members of the Scottish Junior Football Association, and soon won the Lanarkshire Junior League in 1892 and in 1893. In the 1893–94 season, Blantyre reached the Scottish Junior Cup semi-final, losing out to Renfrew Victoria at Kelburn Park.

Later that year, the club then went senior which allowed them to play Scottish Qualifying Cup. Despite being defeated by East Stirlingshire in the fifth round of the 1895–96 Qualifying Cup, Blantyre earned a tie against Heart of Midlothian in the Scottish Cup first round proper, losing the match handily 1–12 in Blantyre. The next edition of the Qualifying Cup saw the Vics beat the likes of Dunfermline Athletic at East End Park only to lose to Arthurlie in the sixth round. Again, due to their performance in the Qualifying Cup, Blantyre entered the 1896–97 Scottish Cup in the first round proper. However, this time they bettered their opponents, Bathgate, 5–0 at home. They then lost their second round (Round of 16) match against Abercorn 4–1.

Due to a lack of success on the pitch at the senior level, the club was dissolved in 1897.

=== Return to Junior football ===
The club was refounded in 1900 by a group of teenagers who paid for it with their own money. The new Victoria team played at Craighead Park (the later home of Blantyre Celtic) but when another club called Blantyre Hibs went defunct, the Vics took over their grounds at Castle Park in Low Blantyre, which is still the home of Vics today. In their first season back as a junior side, the club won the Lanarkshire Juvenile Cup. The team had continued success within the Lanarkshire Junior Football League and Central Junior Football League over the next few decades.

=== Glory years ===
After defeating Mount Ellen United, Arbroath Victoria, Polkemmet, St Anthony's, and finally Ardeer Recreation at Celtic Park, Blantyre Victoria earned a placed in their first Scottish Junior Cup final in 1944. The final was played at Hampden Park against Glasgow Perthshire in front of 44,840 spectators, with the Vics losing the match 1–0. The game was notably the first Scottish football match to be broadcast on the radio. Although the club were bested in the Junior Cup final, the 1943–44 squad achieved a 'treble' that year by winning the West of Scotland Junior Cup, the Lanarkshire Central Cup and the wartime invitational Salute the Soldier Cup.

The Vics had continued cup success in the 1940s. In 1950, they reached their second Scottish Junior Cup final. Their route to the final included wins over Beith, Coltness United, Kilbirnie Ladeside, Carnoustie Panmure, Bo'ness United, Jeanfield Swifts, and Stoneyburn over a twice replayed semi-final at Celtic Park. The final was again held at Hampden Park in front of 44,402 spectators. However this time, after three second half goals from Gill, Swan and Rennick, the Vics defeated Cumnock Juniors to lift the Junior Cup for the first time.

After the victory in 1950, the Vics suffered from losing the majority of the side over the next few seasons, including captain Alec Young to Aberdeen. The club only achieved one piece of silverware in the rest of the decade. The club took in younger players to give them a challenge and become tougher. A product of this philosophy was, future Celtic captain, Billy McNeill who started his career at Blantyre Victoria during the 1950s.

The Vics began to return to form in the mid-1960s under the guidance of Hughie Smith. Future Scotland international Joe Jordan joined the club in 1967 at aged 16 from Cleland Boys Guild before being signed to Morton a year later.

In 1970, Hughie Smith led the club to their third Junior Cup final, defeating junior sides from across Scotland along the way including Newtongrange, Shettleston, Whitburn, Jeanfield Swifts, Dalkeith, and Ardrossan Winton Rovers in the semi-final at Ibrox. The Vics faced Penicuik Athletic in the final at Hampden Park in front of 26,248 fans. In the match, Jim Lynn opened the scoring early on but the 'Cuikie' equalised in the second half to force a replay the following week. Jim Lynn was again on the scoresheet in the replay and this time there was no retaliation from Penicuik. With over 14,000 in attendance at Hampden, the Vics lifted the cup for the second time in their history.

The club won the 1979–80 Central Junior Football League under the stewardship of Dally Duncan, defeating East Kilbride Thistle in the championship match. The following season, the Vics finished as league runners-up after losing the championship decider to Pollok in a penalty shootout 12–11 after a total of 28 penalty kicks. In 1982, the club reached their fourth Scottish Junior Cup final. Their route to final saw the Vics face and defeat St Roch's, Kilsyth, Stonehouse, Glenafton, Whitletts, and Kirkintilloch Rob Roy in the semi-final at Douglas Park. The final, against a formidable Baillieston at Ibrox, was contested in front of 10,746 and was broadcast live on Scottish Television, the first Junior final to be televised. In the 77th minute, Billy Muldoon dinked a ball over the top of the Baillieston back-line to find John McGurk who hooked the ball over Ronnie Lowrie to give the Vics the lead. This goal proved the difference in the end, despite the best efforts of Ballieston, and the Vics lifted the Scottish Junior Cup for the third time.

=== Recent years ===
The Vics suffered in the early 1990s due to lack of finances and the loss of the Blantyre Derby after Blantyre Celtic folded in 1992. In 1990, to help fundraise for the clubs new pavilion, former Vics player, Billy McNeill, offered to bring his Celtic side along to Castle Park for a friendly match. With thousands in attendance, the event was detrimental in raising the necessary funds to build the pavilion that the Vics still use today. The match ended in a 6–2 victory for McNeill's side which included the likes of Steve Fulton, Gerry Creaney and Peter Grant. Three years later, another exhibition took place to help the Vics open their new pavilion. Tommy McLean brought his Motherwell side to Castle Park which including the likes of Davie Cooper and John Philiben. The North Lanarkshire giants thumped the Vics 7-0 but, with thousands in attendance on the day, this pushed the fundraising over the line for the club. The pavilion was officially opened with an exhibition match against the Celtic Reserves later that year.

Competitively, the Vics had many successes during the decade, winning their second treble in 1996 - the Central League One title, the Central League Cup, and Sectional League Cup. The following season, Blantyre reached the semi-finals of the Scottish Junior Cup, losing out to eventual champions Pollok 5–0 at Adamslie Park.

After the treble win, the club could not replicate their success in the new millennium. The Vics achieved no silverware until 2006 when the club won the Central League Division 2. Although, just two years later they found themselves relegated back to Division 2. In their first season back in the bottom tier of the SJFA West Region, the club won the league. However, like their previous league win and subsequent promotion to the First Division, Blantyre Victoria were relegated at the end of the 2010–11 season.

In 2012, Davie Greig was appointed as manager with the aim of promotion and a return to glory for the club. In his second season with as manager of Blantyre, he won the Central League Division 2 title. The following season, Grieg strengthened his squad and won a remarkable back-to-back promotion and the Central League Division 1 title.

After the departure of Greig, Murdie MacKinnon took over for less than a season at Castle Park before leaving for the assistant manager position at Pollok. This resignation paved the way for the appointment of John Gibson as manager. Gibson suffered relegation from Super League First Division in his first season mainly due to starting the year with no signed players. However, in 2018–19 season, Gibson achieved a third-place finish and promotion to back to the West Region Championship. In the following curtailed season, the club were declared joint champions of the West Region Championship along with Darvel.

In 2020, Blantyre Victoria announced they had applied for membership of the new West of Scotland Football League and due to their previous seasons triumph were placed in WoSFL Premier Division. They did this to gain more competition but retain their junior status which allowed them to continue to enter the Scottish Junior Cup. The first WoSFL season was declared null and void after the Vics had only played 7 matches due to the COVID-19 pandemic. In the 2021–22 season of the Premier Division, the Vics finished second last, with only five wins in 38 matches, and were subsequently relegated to WoSFL First Division.

== Records ==
- Best Scottish Cup performance: Second round (Round of 16), 1896–97
- Record home attendance: 9,000+ v Irvine Meadow, Scottish Junior Cup Fifth Round, 10 February 1951
- Biggest victory: 10–0, Vale of Clyde, Scottish Central Junior League East Division, 8 February 1941
- Heaviest defeat: 1–12, Heart of Midlothian, Scottish Cup First Round, 11 January 1896
- Most appearances: John McGurk (1978 -1987?)
- Most goals: Donnie McLean
- Most Scottish Junior international caps: Tommy Coghill, 5 caps

== Notable players ==
=== Capped senior internationals ===
- (Scotland) Joe Jordan - 54 caps
- (Northern Ireland) Stephen Craigan- 54 caps
- (Scotland) Billy McNeill - 29 caps
- (Scotland) Jimmy Brownlie - 16 caps
- (Scotland) Alex Forsyth - 10 caps
- (United States) Bill Carnihan - 2 caps
- (Scotland) Bobby McKean - 1 cap
- (Scotland) Alex Menzies - 1 cap

=== Other notable players ===
- (Scotland) Robert Clark
- (Scotland) Davie Colquhoun
- (Scotland) Willie Findlay
- (Scotland) Billy Henry
- (Scotland) Charlie Johnston
- (Scotland) Adam Little
- (Scotland) Ronnie Lowrie
- (Scotland) Danny McGrain
- (Scotland) Jock Stein
- (Scotland) Alec Young
- (Scotland) Paul McAneny

== Honours ==
=== National ===
Scottish Junior Cup

- Winners (3): 1949–50, 1969–70, 1981–82
- Runners-up: 1943–44

=== League ===
Lanarkshire Junior Football League

- Winners (6): 1892–93, 1893–94, 1905–06, 1910–11, 1919–20, 1926–27
- Runners-up: 1915–16, 1922–23

Burnbank & District Junior League

- Winners (2): 1908–09, 1909–10

Central (Region) League

- Winners (2): 1935–36, 1979–80
- Runners-up: 1940–41, 1980–81

SJFA West Region Championship

- Winners: 2019–20

Central League East Division

- Winners: 1940–41
- Runners-up: 1931–32

Central Region League B Division / Central District League Division One

- Winners (4): 1980–81, 1995–96, 1998–99, 2014–15
- Runners-up: 1953–54, 1966–67

Central Region League C Division / Central District League Division Two

- Winners (4): 1979–80, 2005–06, 2008–09, 2013–14

=== Cup ===
West of Scotland Junior Cup

- Winners: 1943–44
- Runners-up: 1940–41

Evening Times Trophy/Cup-Winners Cup/Champions Cup

- Winners: 1935–36
- Runners-up: 1940–41, 2014–15

Lanarkshire Junior Cup

- Winners (9): 1903–04, 1913–14, 1915–16, 1923–24, 1939–40, 1942–43, 1945–46, 1948–49, 1967–68

Lanarkshire Junior Consolation Cup

- Winners: 1924–25

Lanarkshire Central Cup

- Winners (4): 1931–32, 1940–41, 1943–44, 1956–57

Red Cross Prisoner of War Cup

- Winners: 1942–43

Salute the Soldier Cup

- Winners: 1943–44

Lanarkshire Hozier Cup

- Winners: 1965–66

Central Junior League (Drybroughs) Cup

- Winners (2): 1976–77, 1995–96
- Runners-up: 2014–15

Central Sectional Junior League Cup

- Winners: 1995–96
- Runners-up: 2014–15

Cambuslang & District Junior Cup

- Winners (2): 1890–91, 1892–93

Larkhall Junior Charity Cup

- Winners: 1892–93
