= Bryan Slavin =

Scottish footballer

Personal information
- Full name: Bryan Slavin
- Date of birth: 23 October 1977 (age 49)
- Place of birth: Irvine, Scotland
- Position: Defender

Senior career*
Years	Team	Apps	(Gls)
1996–2000	Greenock Morton	36	(0)
1997–1998	→ Dalry Thistle (loan)		
2000–2012	Auchinleck Talbot		
2012	Saltcoats Victoria		
2013–2014	Dalry Thistle		
2015–2016	Largs Thistle		

Managerial career
- 2015–2016: Largs Thistle
- 2017–2018: Ardrossan Winton Rovers
- * Club domestic league appearances and goals as of 08:32, 12 October 2016 (UTC)

Bryan Slavin is a former professional footballer who has played in the Scottish Football League First Division for Morton.

== Career ==
Slavin spent his senior career with Morton, making one league appearance for the club in March 1997 before being loaned back out to Junior side Dalry Thistle. Recalled for extended first team spells under the management of Billy Stark and subsequently Ian McCall, he made a total of thirty-six league appearances for the Greenock side before being released in 2000, when he joined Auchinleck Talbot.

In the early 2000s on his return to Junior Football, he enjoyed a period of great success winning the Scottish Junior Cup on three occasions, twice as club captain, and appearing for the Scotland Junior international team. He also reached the fourth round of the Scottish Cup in 2011–12 where Talbot finally lost 1–0 to eventual winners Hearts.

Slavin announced his retirement immediately after the 2011–12 Scottish Junior Cup final when Auchinleck lost to Shotts Bon Accord however he subsequently played a few matches for his hometown club Saltcoats Victoria before assisting former teammate Gavin Friels as part of the coaching staff at Dalry Thistle.

In January 2015, Slavin was appointed manager of Largs Thistle and lead the Ayrshire club to promotion from the 2015–16 West of Scotland Super League First Division on the last day of the season. He resigned from his position at Largs in October 2016.

Slavin was appointed manager of Ardrossan Winton Rovers in September 2017. In November, he made a playing comeback in a Scottish Junior Cup tie with Dunbar United. He resigned as manager in March 2018, claiming the players didn't support his methods.
