= John Gibson (footballer, born 1967) =

Scottish footballer

Personal information
- Date of birth: 20 April 1967 (age 59)
- Place of birth: Blantyre, Scotland
- Position: Midfielder

Team information
- Current team: Kirkintilloch Rob Roy (manager)

Youth career
- St Ninians

Senior career*
Years	Team	Apps	(Gls)
1985–1987	Blantyre Victoria		
1987–1988	Hamilton Academical	3	(0)
1988–1994	Alloa Athletic	146	(16)
1994–1998	Stirling Albion	145	(13)
1998–2001	Stenhousemuir	42	(3)
2001–2002	Greenock Morton	22	(1)
- Auchinleck Talbot
Total		358	(33)

Managerial career
- 2016–2024: Blantyre Victoria
- 2024–: Kirkintilloch Rob Roy
- * Club domestic league appearances and goals

John Gibson (born 20 April 1967) is a Scottish former footballer who manages Kirkintilloch Rob Roy in the West of Scotland Football League. He has previously played in the Scottish Football League Premier Division for Hamilton Academical.

== Career ==
Gibson began his playing career with hometown Junior club Blantyre Victoria and was picked up by nearby Hamilton Academical under the management of John Lambie. After making his debut for the club in the final Premier Division fixture of the 1986–87 season against Hibernian, Gibson made two further league appearances for Accies before joining Alloa Athletic. Gibson enjoyed lengthy spells at Alloa then Stirling Albion and also played for Stenhousemuir and Morton.

He was appointed as manager of Blantyre Victoria in June 2016, before joining Rob Roy in 2024.
