= Tom Donnelly (Scottish footballer) =

Scottish footballer (born 1947)

Personal information
- Full name: Thomas Donnelly
- Date of birth: 12 March 1947
- Place of birth: Irvine, Scotland
- Height: 5 ft 9 in (1.75 m)
- Positions: Right half; inside right

Youth career
- 1964–1966: Rangers

Senior career*
Years	Team	Apps	(Gls)
1966–1968	Rangers	0	(0)
1968–1971	Motherwell	74	(10)
1971–1978	East Stirlingshire	216	(26)
1978–1980	St Roch's		
Total		290	(36)
- * Club domestic league appearances and goals

Thomas Donnelly (born 12 March 1947) is a Scottish former footballer who played as a right half or inside right.

Having come to the attention of professional clubs as part of a successful school team at Cumnock Academy, Donnelly began his career at Rangers in 1964 but failed to break into the first team. Released in 1968, he joined Motherwell and quickly became an important part of the team as they won the Scottish Division Two title in 1968–69 to regain the top-tier status they lost a year earlier. Donnelly's importance in the side began to diminish, and in 1971 he moved on to part-timers East Stirlingshire, where he was a regular for the next seven years before retiring via a spell with St Roch's in the junior leagues. By that point he had qualified as a school teacher in Glasgow.

His son Simon was also a footballer who played for clubs including Celtic and Partick Thistle, and for the Scotland national team.
