= Jim George (footballer) =

Scottish footballer and manager

Personal information
- Position: Midfielder

Youth career
- Kilbowie Union

Senior career*
Years	Team	Apps	(Gls)
1972–1974	St Johnstone	13	(0)
1974–1979	East Fife	98	(6)
1979–1980	Queen of the South	4	(1)
1980–	Shettleston		
Total		115	(7)

Managerial career
- 1988–1990: Dumbarton
- * Club domestic league appearances and goals

Jim George is a Scottish former football player and manager. He played for four clubs: St Johnstone, East Fife, Queen of the South and Shettleston. He had a stint as manager of Dumbarton between 1988 and 1990.

== Honours ==
Dumbarton

- Stirlingshire Cup : 1989–90, 1990–91
