= Neilston F.C. =

Association football club in Scotland

Neilston FC
- Full name: Neilston Football Club
- Nickname: The Farmer's Boys
- Founded: 1897
- Ground: Brig O' Lea Stadium, Neilston
- Capacity: 2,000
- Coordinates: 55°46′50″N 4°26′4″W
- Chairman: Graham Walker
- Manager: Andy Whiteford
- League: West of Scotland Football League First Division
- 2025–26: West of Scotland League First Division, 13th of 16
Home colours	Away colours

Neilston Football Club are a Scottish football club based in Neilston, East Renfrewshire who currently play in the West of Scotland League First Division. This is tier 7 of the Scottish FA league pyramid system.

== History ==
Neilston Victoria were formed in 1897 as a juvenile club who ground shared Broadlie Park with the village's SFA senior side at that time, Neilston FC., initially playing in an all light blue kit.

In 1899 the land at Broadlie Park was needed for a new goods yard to be built next to the proposed Neilston railway station. Neilston Victoria Secretary John Kirk Junior secured a lease on the Crofthead Mill recreation ground at Brig O'Lea and opened the new ground with a match against Springhill from Barrhead on the 14th October 1899.

In 1901 Neilston Victoria left juvenile football and joined the Scottish Junior Football Association and played in the Western Junior League. The kit was black and white hoops with black shorts and socks.

In 1903, the club won their first trophy, beating Levern Victoria 2-1 at Summerlea Park, Thornliebank in the Glasgow South-Side Junior Cup Final.

A new pavilion was built at Brig O'Lea in 1904 which would eventually be replaced by the current one in December 1964.

The club had to leave Brig O'Lea for two seasons in 1912 when the Crofthead Mill wanted the park for cricket and a football team called Alexander's XI, relocating to a new ground at Kirktonfield winning a first league championship title (the Scottish Junior League) in season 1912/13. By this time the club was wearing red shirts with white shorts and red socks.

In 1914 the club were singled out in the newspapers, along with Port Glasgow Athletic, for the high number of players who were enlisting during the First World War. However the club stopped playing in April 1940 when the Second World War was showing no signs of ending.

On Monday 4th June 1945 a public meeting was held in the old wooden clubhouse at Brig O'Lea to bring back junior football at Brig O'Lea. The following men were responsible for getting the club back playing - President J Dunlop, Vice President T Young, Secretary W Neil, Treasurer J Muir, Minute Secretary R Miller and the General Committee of J Docherty, A Little, J McCartney, J Smith and H Toner. The club changed its name to Neilston Juniors and joined the Western League (North) to play with predominantly Ayrshire clubs.

Just two years after resuming playing, the club finished the 1946/47 season as the Western League Champions and also won the Western League Cup and Renfrewshire Cup.

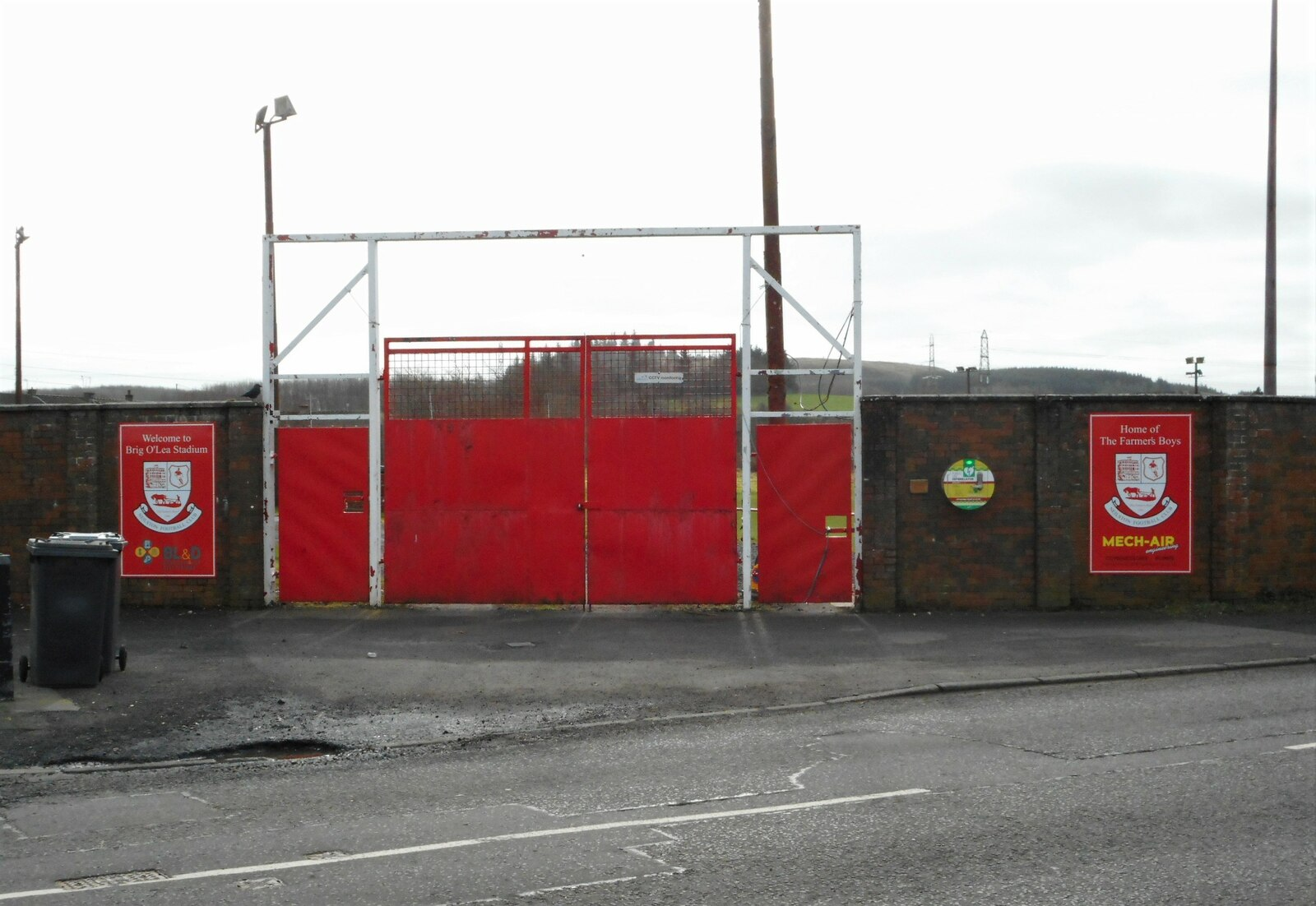
Entrance gates to Brig O' Lea Stadium

Renfrew District Council took over ownership of Brig O’Lea Stadium in the early 1960s and built a new clubhouse and installed floodlights for season 1964/65. The new look stadium was opened on Monday 21st December 1964 when Neilston Juniors played Greenock Morton under the new floodlights.

The first competitive junior match under floodlights took place at Brig O'Lea Stadium on the 17th February 1965 when Neilston Juniors defeated Kilwinning Rangers 4-3 in a Western League (North) fixture. STV's Scotsport cameras showed highlights on television later that evening along with highlights of the Inter Milan v Rangers European Cup quarter final.

In 1968, the club left the Western League to join the Central League and in the first season finished runners-up to Petershill in the "B" Division. In season 1970–71, the club were "C" Division Champions.

On 6th October 1998, the club won their first major trophy in 51 years by defeating Baillieston 5–0 at Fir Park, Motherwell in the Beatons Sectional League Cup Final.

The club's biggest ever margin of victory was on 9th November 2002 when they defeated Kinloss away 15-1 in the Scottish Junior Cup 2nd round. Season 2005/06 was the most successful for 50 years as the club finished champions of the Stagecoach Super League First Division and won the Carlsberg Sectional League Cup against East Kilbride Thistle 4–3 on penalties after a 0–0 draw at Firhill Stadium on 4th October 2005.

A 5th league title came in season 2013/14 with the Central District First Division Championship.

In 2020, the club left the West Region of the SJFA and moved to the newly formed West of Scotland Football League as part of the Scottish FA league pyramid system with members voting to drop the "Juniors" part of the club's name.

The club returned to SJFA membership in season 2024/25 and competed in the Scottish Junior Cup for the first time since season 2019/20.

The 6th league title in the club's history came when they won the West of Scotland Football League 2nd Division Championship in season 2024/25.

== Scoring Records ==
- Highest home league win - Neilston Victoria 10 Kilsyth Emmett 0, Scottish Junior League, 18th January 1913
- Highest away league win - Glengarnock Vale 0 Neilston Victoria 8, Western Junior League, 19th April 1924
- Highest home cup win - Neilston Victoria 12 Bute Athletic 1, Renfrewshire Junior Cup 2nd round, 12th October 1912
- Highest away cup win - Kinloss 1 Neilston Juniors 15, Scottish Junior Cup 2nd round, 9th November 2002
- Highest cup final win - Neilston Victoria 9 Rothesay St Blane's 1, Renfrewshire Junior Cup Final, 6th August 1910
- Highest drawn match - Neilston Juniors 6 Dreghorn 6, Irvine & District Cup 1st round, 30th August 1954

== Notable players ==
Tommy Adams - won the Scottish Cup and the League Cup with East Fife

Stevie Aitken - manager of Stranraer and Dumbarton

Willie Bell - capped for Scotland and manager of Birmingham City

Dixie Deans - won the Scottish 1st Division, the Scottish Cup, the League Cup and the Drybrough Cup with Celtic. Capped for Scotland

Danny Diver - manager of East Stirlingshire

John Fulton - won the Victory Cup with St Mirren

George Fyfe - won the English United League Cup with Watford

George Hunter - won the Scottish Cup with Celtic

Jimmy Lawson - won the Scottish Cup with Dundee

James Leslie - scored the 1st ever goal at Roker Park, Sunderland

Tom McArthur - won the English 2nd Division with Leicester City

Bob McKay - won the Scottish Cup with Morton, the English 1st Division with Newcastle United, capped for Scotland and Dundee United manager.

John McLeod - won the English 1st Division with Manchester City and the English 3rd Division with Millwall

Hammy McMeechan - won the Dockerty Cup, the Ampol Cup, the Victoria State League Championship all in Australia and capped for Australia

Tommy McMillan - won the Scottish Cup and Drybrough cup with Aberdeen, capped for Scotland U23's and manager of Inverness Thistle

Jim Pearson - capped for Australia

John Smith - won the English 2nd Division with Middlesbrough and capped for Scotland

Bobby Templeton - 11 years as Hibernian manager

Bob Thyne - capped for Scotland

Peter Weir - won the Scottish Premier League, the Scottish Cup, the League Cup, the European Cup Winners' Cup, the European Super Cup with Aberdeen and capped for Scotland

Ian Young - won the Scottish 1st Division, the Scottish Cup and the League Cup with Celtic and capped for Scotland u23's

== Club Honours ==
Scottish Junior League Champions 1913
Western League Champions 1947
Central League 'C' Division Champions 1971
Superleague 1st Division Champions 2006
Central District 1st Division Champions 2014
West of Scotland Football League 2nd Division Champions 2025
Glasgow South-Side Junior Cup Winners 1903
Western League Cup Winners 1947
Sectional League Cup Winners 1998 & 2005
Renfrewshire Junior Cup Winners 1906, 1907, 1910, 1913, 1914, 1922, 1947, 1948, 1952 & 1965
Renfrewshire Junior Cup Finalists 1908, 1911, 1912, 1916, 1933, 1953, 1955, 1956, 1957, 1962 & 1967
Renfrewshire Junior Consolation Cup Winners 1915, 1916, 1918 & 1951
Renfrewshire Junior Consolation Cup Finalists 1917, 1924, 1933 & 1936
Renfrewshire & Dunbartonshire Cup Winners 1930 & 1952
Renfrewshire & Dunbartonshire Cup Finalists 1929 & 1936
Carswell Cup Winners 1906 & 1913
Gourock & District Victory Cup Winners 1920
Clark Testimonial Cup Winners 1938
Kirkwood Shield Winners 1967
Erskine Cup Winners 1991 & 1994
McGregor Cup Winners 1991
West of Scotland Cup Finalists 1963
Central League Cup Finalists 1985
Cup Winners' Cup Finalists 2014
Strathclyde Cup Finalists 2024
Paisley & District Cup Finalists 1903 & 1920
Balderston Shield Finalists 1904
Irvine & District Junior Cup Finalists 1947, 1952 & 1954
Vernon Trophy Finalists 1947
Moore Cup Finalists 1948
Land O' Burns Cup Finalists 1959

== Coaching staff 2025/26 ==
Role	Name
Manager	(Scotland) Andy Whiteford
Coach	(Scotland) Derek Kennedy
Coach	(Scotland) Craig Murphy
Goalkeeping Coach	(Scotland) Nathan Bogle
Physiotherapist	(Scotland) Paul MacDonald
