= Brian Ross (footballer) =

Scottish footballer and manager

Personal information
- Date of birth: 15 August 1967 (age 59)
- Place of birth: Stirling, Scotland
- Height: 5 ft 11 in (1.80 m)
- Position: Defender

Youth career
- Gairdoch United

Senior career*
Years	Team	Apps	(Gls)
1984–1988	Airdrieonians	31	(0)
1988–1991	Ayr United	25	(0)
1991–2000	East Stirlingshire	201	(3)
Total		257	(3)

Managerial career
- 2001–2002: East Stirlingshire
- * Club domestic league appearances and goals

Brian Ross (born 15 August 1967) is a Scottish football player and manager. He played for Airdrieonians, Ayr United and East Stirlingshire as a defender, then became manager of East Stirlingshire for a year. He was appointed manager in February 2001, when he was promoted after manager George Fairley left East Stirlingshire to become general manager of Clyde. Ross made several changes to the squad in the summer of 2001, particularly bringing in younger players from junior and youth clubs, but he left East Stirlingshire in February 2002.
