= Bobby McCulley =

Scottish footballer and manager

Personal information
- Full name: Robert McCulley
- Date of birth: 2 December 1951 (age 74)
- Place of birth: Glasgow, Scotland
- Position: Midfielder

Senior career*
Years	Team	Apps	(Gls)
- St. Roch's
1971–1972	Hamilton Academical	1	(0)
1972–1982	East Stirlingshire	262	(30)
1982	Ayr United	9	(0)
1982	→ Dumbarton (loan)	3	(0)
1982–1985	Falkirk	66	(3)
1985–1986	Stirling Albion	21	(1)
1986–1989	Shettleston		
1989–1991	East Stirlingshire	6	(0)
Total		368	(34)

Managerial career
- 1992–1993: East Stirlingshire
- * Club domestic league appearances and goals

Robert McCulley (born 2 December 1951 in Glasgow) is a Scottish former football player and manager.
