= Pollok F.C. =

Association football club in Glasgow, Scotland

Pollok
- Full name: Pollok Football Club
- Nicknames: The Lok , The Southside's Local Team
- Founded: 1908 (117 years ago)
- Ground: Newlandsfield Park, Glasgow
- Capacity: 2,088 (All Standing)
- President: Paul Regan
- Manager: Stewart Maxwell
- League: Lowland League West
- 2025–26: West of Scotland Football League Premier Division, 4th of 16
- Website: Official website
Home colours	Away colours	Third colours

Pollok Football Club is a Scottish football club based in Newlands in the southside of the city of Glasgow. Founded in 1908, the club spent over a century in the junior ranks but now competes in the Lowland League West in tier five of the Scottish football pyramid. Pollok play at Newlandsfield Park and wear black and white stripes. Their traditional rivals are Arthurlie of Barrhead.

== History ==
=== Early years (1908–1967) ===
Pollok FC was formed in 1908 as an offshoot of Poloc Cricket Club following a meeting at Pollokshaws Burgh Hall. The club's first President was James MacDougall, with politician and landowner Sir John Stirling Maxwell nominated as honorary president. Stirling Maxwell donated their first ground called Haggs Park within his family's Pollok Estate, which was the club's home until 1926. The new club's first match was a 5-0 defeat away to Bellshill Athletic, and the honour of scoring the first-ever Pollok goal went to Sanny Brown who scored in a 4-1 defeat to Kirkintilloch Harp a week later. It took until their sixth match to secure their first win - a 3-1 Junior League triumph against St Ninian's Thistle in the opening match at Haggs Park in front of about 1000 spectators. That opening season was a tough one with Pollok only winning four matches and going out of three out of four cups in the first round.

In the first half century of their existence, Pollok were one of many average clubs in Junior football in Glasgow, with their success limited to minor cups such as the North Eastern Cup, Kirkwood Shield and Glasgow Consolation Cup. The club moved to their current home at Newlandsfield Park in 1928, but major success remained elusive.

Pollok began to make their mark in major tournaments during the Second World War, lifting a Central League Cup and Glasgow Challenge Cup double in 1942. Their standout season in those early years was 1944–45, as they reached the Scottish Junior Cup semi-final, where they fell to Burnbank Athletic at Shawfield in front of 25,000 fans. The previous round saw a record crowd of over 10,000 pack into Newlandsfield to watch the Lok overcome Fauldhouse United. This season also saw Pollok lift their first ever West of Scotland Junior Cup after a 6–1 replay win against Glasgow Perthshire.

=== Rise to prominence (1967–2002) ===
The club eventually rose to prominence upon the demise of Third Lanark in 1967 with many supporters opting to support Pollok, being in close proximity on the south side of Glasgow. Pollok finally lifted a top-flight league title as they topped the Central League in 1978–79. They retained their title in 1981, alongside their first Scottish Junior Cup, with Norrie Fulton scoring the only goal of the game at Hampden Park in front of 13,518 supporters.

Pollok lifted the Junior Cup again in 1985, when they defeated Petershill after a replay in the final with Derek Lea scoring the winning goal. This season also saw them win the second of three Central Premier Division titles in a row to make the 1980s the club's most successful decade in their history. Their hopes of winning back to back Junior Cups were dashed in 1986 however, as they fell to a 3–2 defeat against Auchinleck Talbot in the tournament's centenary year.

The club's success continued into the 1990s, a decade which brought eleven trophies, including three league titles. The pinncacle though was a third Junior Cup success in 1997, as Pollok beat Tayport 3–1 at Fir Park. For the second time however, they were denied back to back cup wins, this time by rivals Arthurlie who triumphed 4–0 in the 1998 final. Manager Jim O'Donnell left, along with much of the squad, being replaced by former player Andy Dailly, who only lasted 37 matches before being replaced himself by long-serving goalkeeper Ronnie Lowrie.

=== SJFA West Region (2002–2021) ===
Junior football in the west of Scotland was restructured in 2002, amalgamating the Central and Ayrshire leagues to form the West Region. Prior to this Pollok had been champions of the Central league eight times. The top league of the new set up was the West Premier League which Pollok became the inaugural champions of in 2003 under Ronnie Lowrie, before further triumphs in 2005 and 2007 under Rab Sneddon.

Beginning in the 2007–08 season the SFA began inviting the winners of the four major Junior honours (Scottish Junior Cup, West Premier League, East Super League, & North Premier League) to take part in the Senior Scottish Cup. Pollok were reigning champions of the West Premier League at the time, and took part in the 2007–08 Scottish Cup. In the 1st round 'Lok were drawn away against St Cuthbert Wanderers of the South of Scotland League. The match took place at St. Mary's Park, Kirkcudbright with Pollok winning comfortably by 6 goals to 2. Montrose of the Third Division were to be Pollok's opponents in the second round. Pollok performed admirably against the Scottish League club, achieving a 2–2 draw at Links Park. In the replay at Newlandsfield Pollok were not as successful and lost 1–0.

The end of that campaign again saw Pollok crowned West Premier League Champions, after a long run of rearranged games at the end of the campaign culminated in a 5–4 win against Glenafton to secure the crown. At the start of the following season they were eliminated in the first round of the 2008–09 Scottish Cup by Edinburgh-based East of Scotland team Spartans. At the end of the season Pollok had a chance to once again retain their West Premier League championship but lost the last league game of the season away to Auchinleck Talbot by failing to defend a 1–0 lead in the last eight minutes. Having exited the Scottish Junior Cup at the semi-final stage for the second year in a row, manager Jim Sinnett resigned after the game.

2009–10 did not go well for Pollok with an early exit in the Scottish Junior Cup away to Newtongrange Star. In March 2010 manager Rab Sneddon resigned for work reasons and was succeeded by Willie Irvine.

Season 2010–11 saw Pollok suffer an exit at home to Neilston Juniors in the Scottish Junior Cup. Season 2011–12 saw Pollok lose four of their opening seven league fixtures, prompting Willie Irvine to tender his resignation on Monday, 10 October 2011. His eventual replacement was John Richardson, who kept the club in the top flight after a relegation play-off against Renfrew. Season 2012–13 saw Pollok win both the Central Sectional League Cup and the Central League Cup as well as narrowly avoiding relegation for the second year running. Only three players were retained from the previous season for 2013–14. This season was a disaster for Pollok. The club was embroiled in many off field controversies and had four different managers throughout the season.

Tony McInally was appointed as manager in December 2013 but Pollok were finally relegated on 28 April 2014 with a 3–2 loss to Glenafton Athletic. Under McInally, Pollok were promoted as Champions the following season and won the Evening Times Champions Cup. The club reached the final of the 2015–16 Scottish Junior Cup but lost to Beith Juniors on penalty kicks after a 1–1 draw.

In 2016, the club briefly received widespread media attention after right-back Tam Hanlon scored a hat-trick of long-range goals (two free kicks and one from open play) in a match against Neilston. The feat was captured on video and went viral, being viewed millions of times and leading international players and pundits to praise the quality of the goals.

Pollok won the 2017 West of Scotland Junior Cup, with a 5–4 victory on penalties against Cumnock Juniors after the match in front of over 1000 spectators at Newlandsfield had ended with the scores level at 2–2.

Pollok lifted the Central League Cup in June 2018, after a 3–1 win against Cumbernauld United in Shettleston before Tony McInally departed Newlandsfield in October 2018. and was replaced shortly after by Murdie MacKinnon, who had previously served as assistant manager.

In March 2020, Pollok played their final match as a junior club when they defeated Dalry Thistle 2–1 in the West of Scotland Cup. The next round was due to be played the following week against Irvine Meadow, but that tie was postponed before all remaining league and cup matches were cancelled by the SJFA due to the COVID-19 pandemic. Pollok eventually finished third in their final West Region Premiership campaign after the title was awarded to Auchinleck Talbot on a points-per-game basis. The 2019–20 Scottish Junior Cup was eventually declared null and void in March 2021 with Pollok having reached the semi-final.

=== West of Scotland Football League and SFA membership (2021–2026) ===
In 2020, Pollok moved from the SJFA, to join the pyramid system in Scottish football as one of the inaugural members of the West of Scotland Football League.

On 11 October 2020, the club announced they would not be participating in the inaugural season of the West of Scotland League due to concerns relating to the COVID-19 pandemic, citing safety of volunteers and players, and the financial impact on the club of pursuing a campaign with no matchday income, as the main reasons.

In July 2021, Pollok played their first competitive match as a senior side when they began their inaugural West of Scotland Football League Premier Division season with a 5–1 win at home to Blantyre Victoria in front of a crowd of 500, as full stadiums were not yet permitted under COVID-19 restrictions. Pollok's first goal at this level was scored by Adam Forde. As members of the West of Scotland Football League, Pollok also made their debut in the South Challenge Cup in October 2021, beating Vale of Clyde in a 4–0 win at Fullarton Park in Glasgow's East End. After a 38-game season, Pollok finished their maiden campaign in third place. The club were accepted as members of the Scottish FA on the 25th May 2022, allowing them to enter the Scottish Cup the following season. On the 19th June, Pollok confirmed via their website that they would not renew their SJFA membership.

In August 2022, Pollok returned to the Scottish Cup for the first time since 2008 with a 6–0 win at home to Girvan in the 2022 – 23 Preliminary Round. They then repeated this scoreline in the following round at home to Highland League side Huntly. They followed this up with a 4–3 win at home to Annan Athletic in the second round in front of the BBC Scotland cameras. This represented the club's first ever victory against SPFL opposition. Manager Murdo MacKinnon resigned from his post after four years in November 2022 following a West of Scotland Cup defeat at home to Division 1 side St Cadoc's, and was replaced by former Kirkintilloch Rob Roy manager Stewart Maxwell. His first game was the Scottish Cup Round 3 match against Ayr United at Somerset Park, as Pollok fell to a narrow 1–0 defeat against the Championship leaders. The following season, after another third round Scottish Cup exit, Pollok reached their first final since 2018 as they fell 2–0 to Darvel in the final of the West of Scotland Football League Cup at Broadwood. In May 2026, Pollok secured their place as one of the top nine licensed sides in the Premier Division and qualified for the new Lowland League West, eventually finishing fourth.

=== Lowland League West (2026 - Present) ===
Pollok played their first game in the new Lowland League West in July 2026, beating Troon 2-0 at Newlandsfield with Lewis McCracken scoring the club's first goal at Tier 5 in the Scottish pyramid.

== Scottish Cup participation ==
Season	Progress	Opposition
2007–08	Second Round	St Cuthbert Wanderers, Montrose
2008–09	First Round	Spartans
2022–23	Third Round	Girvan, Huntly, Annan Athletic, Ayr United
2023–24	Third Round	Benburb, Penicuik Athletic, Gala Fairydean Rovers, Brora Rangers
2024–25	Preliminary Round 2	Darvel
2025-26	First Round	St Cadoc's, Tranent
2026-27	Second Round	Albion Rovers, Threave Rovers

Following a restructuring of the Scottish Cup in 2007, four Scottish Junior FA clubs were admitted into the competition and Pollok took their place in the competition for the first time as champions of the SJFA West Premier League. Their first match in the competition was a thumping 6–2 win against South of Scotland side St Cuthbert Wanderers in Kirkcudbright.

The second round draw saw Pollok travel to Links Park, to face Scottish Football League opposition in competitive action for the first time in the form of Montrose. Despite taking an early lead through Robert Downs, Pollock required a late equaliser from David Turnbull to force a replay. Nearly 2000 supporters packed into Newlandsfield for the historic occasion, as the home side were narrowly edged out 1–0 in their maiden Scottish Cup campaign.

After retaining their title, Pollok again took their place in the competition in 2008. A 1–1 home draw with Spartans was followed by a 1–0 defeat in the replay, as Pollok dropped out of the competition for the next fourteen years.

Pollok narrowly lost their league crown on the last day of the 2008–09 season, and failed to win an SJFA title again before joining the West of Scotland Football League in 2020. This kicked off Pollok's journey to achieve SFA member status, which was granted in May 2022, granting the club entry into the following season's Scottish Cup.

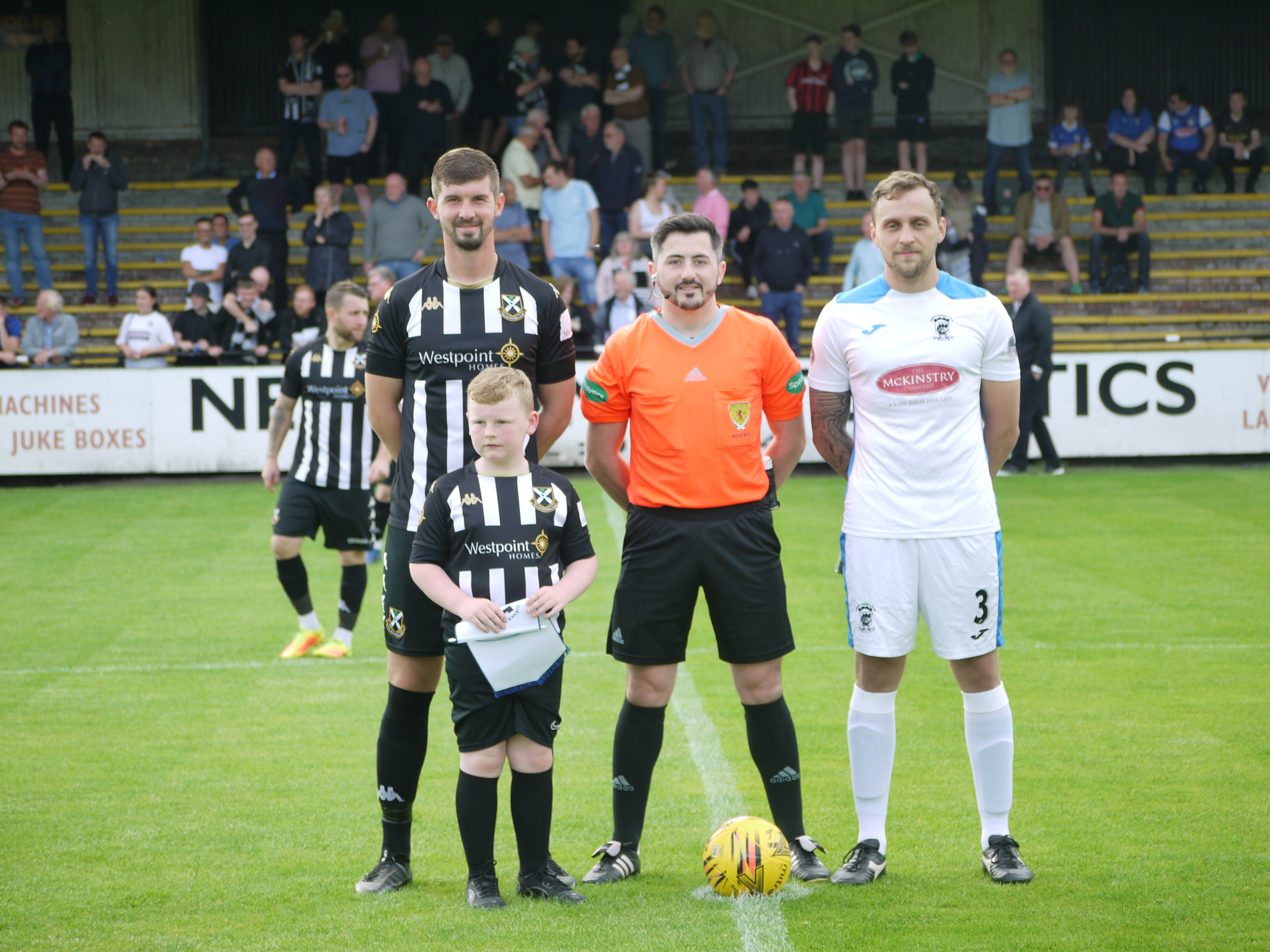
Pollok's captain David Brownlie prior to the 6–0 win v Girvan in August 2022.

Girvan were the visitors in August 2022 as Newlandsfield hosted Scottish Cup football for the first time in fourteen years under the management of Murdo MacKinnon, and Pollock won the preliminary round tie 6–0. This result was repeated in the First Round at home to Highland League side Huntly, in a match that was intended for live television coverage, but this was cancelled due to a demand on BBC Scotland's resources following the death of the Queen. The second round saw Annan Athletic of SPFL League 2 come to Newlandsfield. Pollok triumphed 4–3 in front of the BBC Scotland cameras in a tie which was their first ever competitive victory against SPFL opposition.

The reward for that win was a trip to Somerset Park to face Championship leaders Ayr United, the highest ranked team Pollok had ever faced in competitive action. Despite a strong defensive performance, the home side won 1–0 in front of 2425 supporters, with 726 Pollok fans.

The following season again saw Pollok knocked out in the third round with a 1–0 defeat away to Brora Rangers of the Highland League, having seen off Benburb, Penicuik Athletic and Gala Fairydean Rovers in the previous rounds. Season 24-25 saw Pollok's earliest departure from the competition since 2008, with a 3-1 loss to Darvel in the second preliminary round. 2025-26 saw the Pollok make it a step further, with their first ever win against St Cadoc's securing a first round tie against Tranent, which they lost 3-0.

== Season-by-season record ==
=== West of Scotland Football League Premier Division (2021-2026) ===
Season	League							Scottish Cup	Other cups
Season	Finish	Played	Wins	Draws	Losses	GD	Points	Scottish Cup	Other cups
2021-22	3rd	38	23	7	8	+39	76	Did not compete	South Challenge Cup QF, WoSFL Cup SF, Scottish Junior Cup R2
2022-23	5th	30	17	1	12	+15	48	3rd Round Lost to Ayr United	South Challenge Cup R2, WoSFL Cup R1
2023-24	6th	30	14	8	8	+17	50	3rd Round Lost to Brora Rangers	South Challenge Cup R4, WoSFL Cup runners-up (losing to Darvel), Scottish Junior Cup R2
2024-25	9th	30	10	5	15	-8	35	1st Round Lost to Darvel	South Challenge Cup R4, WoSFL Cup R3, Scottish Junior Cup R5
2025-26	4th (Promoted to Lowland League West)	30	15	2	13	+9	47	1st Round Lost to Tranent	South Challenge Cup R2, WoSFL Cup R1, Scottish Communities Cup QF

== Crest and colours ==
Pollok's badge is a simple shield containing a black and white saltire, a football and a tree, which is a nod to the coat of arms of Glasgow.

Since their formation, Pollok have played in black and white as a tribute to their first honorary President Sir John Stirling-Maxwell, who gifted the club land within the Pollok estate for use as their home park. The colours and saltire were taken from the coat of arms of Pollokshaws, which was itself drawn from the coat of arms of the Maxwell family.

== Stadium ==
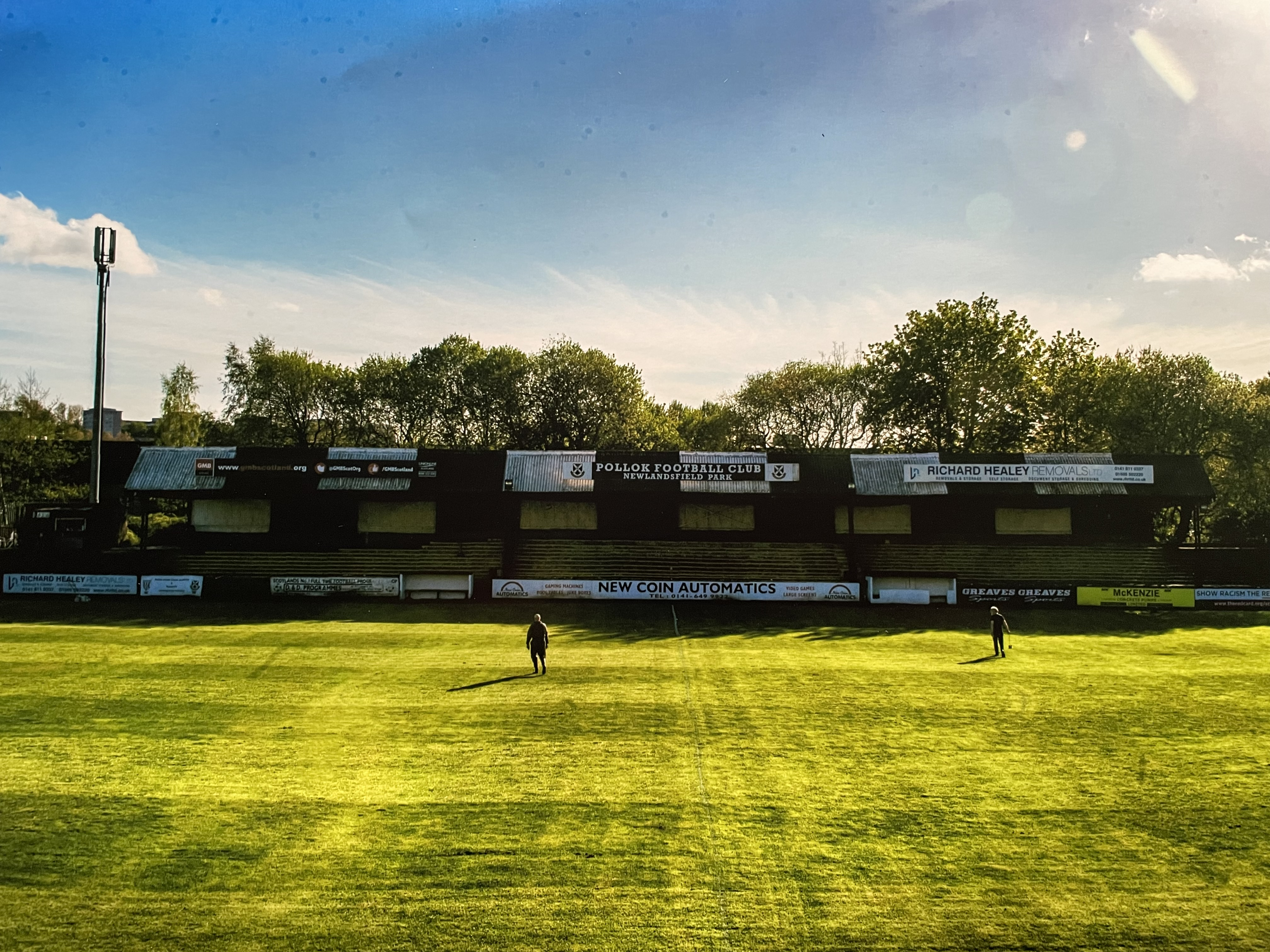

Pollok play their home games at Newlandsfield Park in the Newlands area of Glasgow, a ground they have used since the 1928–29 season. The stadium has a capacity of 2,088, and is entirely made up of terracing.

Pollok's first ground was at Haggs Park in the Pollok Estate, but they were forced to move out in 1926–27 as Glasgow City Council wanted the land for school pitches. After playing temporarily at Rosebery Park and the Queen Mary Tea Gardens at Speirsbridge (in Thornliebank), they acquired Newlandsfield Park, which has been their ground ever since.

In January 2022, the club received planning permission to install floodlights at Newlandsfield. These were installed and switched on for the first time in April 2022. The first match played under the lights was a 1–0 victory against Clydebank in the WoSFL Cup quarter final in May 2022.

The ground features in Leon Gladwell's book "European Football's Greatest Grounds', coming in at 93rd and being described as "the perfect small inner-city football ground."

== Current squad ==
As of 9 October 2026

Note: Flags indicate national team as defined under FIFA eligibility rules; some limited exceptions apply. Players may hold more than one non-FIFA nationality.

No.	Pos.	Nation	Player
1	GK	SCO	Kevin Patrick McAllister
2	DF	SCO	Cameron Henry
3	DF	SCO	Jack Walsh
4	DF	SCO	Stewart Houston
5	DF	SCO	Ryan McCreath
7	FW	SCO	Stuart McCann
6	MF	SCO	Jake Stirling
8	MF	SCO	Jordan Leyden
9	FW	SCO	Bob McHugh
10	MF	SCO	Olly Cameron
11	FW	SCO	Alex Cassells
12	MF	SCO	Jon Millerick

No.	Pos.	Nation	Player
14	MF	SCO	Scott Boyle (On loan from Stirling Albion)
15	MF	SCO	Mark O'Rourke
16	FW	POL	Przemyslaw Dachnowicz
17	MF	SCO	Lee Gallacher
19	MF	SCO	Lewis Watt
20	MF	SCO	Lewis McCracken
21	GK	SCO	Patrick O'Neil
22	MF	SCO	Liam McGonigle
23	DF	SCO	Jamie Bain (captain)
24	DF	SCO	Dom McLaughlin
26	DF	SCO	Jack Brown
32	FW	SCO	Sallu Turay

=== On loan ===
Note: Flags indicate national team as defined under FIFA eligibility rules; some limited exceptions apply. Players may hold more than one non-FIFA nationality.

No.	Pos.	Nation	Player
—	DF	SCO	Luke Doran (on loan at Kirkintilloch Rob Roy)
—	MF	SCO	Dylan Baldwin (on loan at Easterhouse FA)
—	MF	SCO	Matthew O'Donnell (on loan at Shotts Bon Accord)

== Coaching staff ==
As of 8 July 2026

Role	Name
Manager	(Scotland) Stewart Maxwell
Assistant manager	(Scotland) Chris McFadyen
Coach	(Scotland) Josh Gardner
Coach	(Scotland) John Dunn
Goalkeeping coach	(Scotland) Ali McGhee
Physio	(Scotland) Ross Anderson
Kit Manager	(Scotland) John Knox

== Development Squad ==
As of 21 February 2026

Note: Flags indicate national team as defined under FIFA eligibility rules; some limited exceptions apply. Players may hold more than one non-FIFA nationality.

No.	Pos.	Nation	Player
—	GK	SCO	Andrew Burns
—	GK	SCO	Liam O'Connor
—	DF	IRQ	Ahmed Alkhotaimi
—	DF	SCO	Michael Allison
—	DF	SCO	Noah McGuire
—	DF	SCO	George Procopciuc
—	DF	ESA	Derling Coreas
—	DF	SCO	Aydin Murray
—	DF	SCO	Scott Ritchie
—	DF	SCO	Shaun Traynor
—	DF	SCO	Jay Trevet
—	MF	NGR	Habib Buraimoh
—	MF	SCO	Ben McAulay

No.	Pos.	Nation	Player
—	MF	SCO	Luke McGraw
—	MF	SCO	Josh McLean
—	MF	SCO	Lewis Scott
—	MF	SCO	Jake Simpson
—	MF	SCO	Ben McAulay
—	MF	ZIM	Tanyaradzwa Sithole
—	MF	SCO	Anton Sweeney
—	FW	SYR	Hamza Alkanatrah
—	FW	KUW	Yousif Alshamri
—	FW	SCO	Ryan McDonald
—	FW	SCO	Ilo Ndhlovu
—	FW	SCO	Kyle Shannon

=== Coaching staff ===
Role	Name
Manager	(Scotland) Josh Key
Coach	(Scotland) Ross Murray
Coach	(Scotland) Ian Finlayson

== Executive committee ==
Position	Name
President	Paul Regan
Vice President/Treasurer	Cain Fletcher
Club Secretary	Garry Cullen
Match Secretary	Jack Docherty
Minute Secretary	Nikki Money

== Honours ==
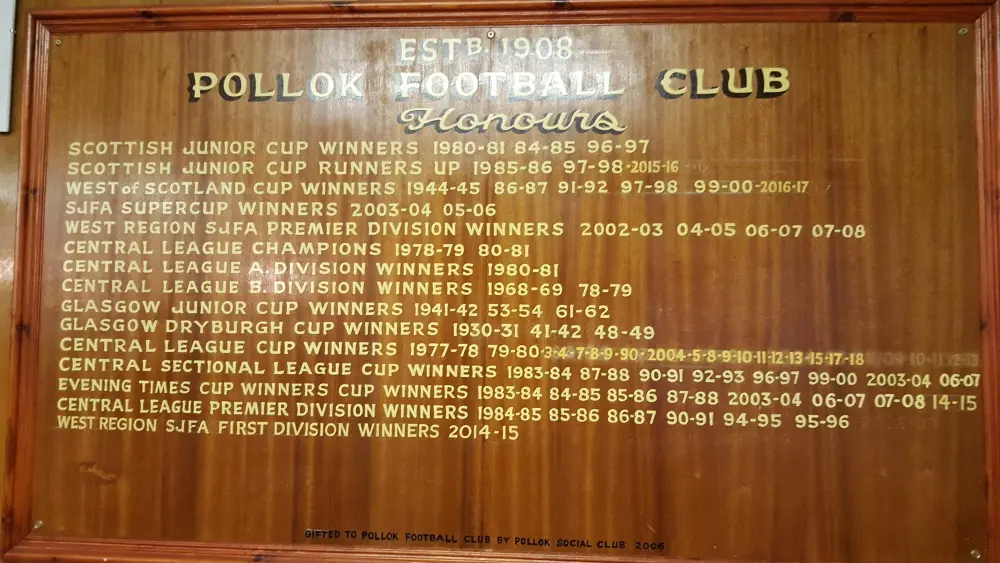

Scottish Junior Cup

- Winners: 1980–81, 1984–85, 1996–97
- Runners-up: 1985–86, 1997–98, 2015–16

SJFA West Premier League

- Winners: 2002–03, 2004–05, 2006–07, 2007–08

Central League Premier Division

- Winners: 1984–85, 1985–86, 1986–87, 1990–91, 1994–95, 1995–96

Central League

- Winners: 1978–79, 1980–81

Central League A Division

- Winners: 1980–81

Central League B Division

- Winners: 1968–69, 1978–79

SJFA West Super First Division

- Winners: 2014–15

West of Scotland Junior Cup

- Winners: 1944–45, 1986–87, 1991–92, 1997–98, 1999–2000, 2016–17
- Runners-up: 1985–86, 1994–95, 2007–08, 2010–11

Evening Times Cup Winners Cup

- Winners: 1979–80, 1980–81, 1983–84, 1984–85, 1985–86, 1987–88, 2003–04, 2006–07, 2007–08, 2014–15

West of Scotland Football League Cup

- Runners-up: 2023–24

=== Other honours ===
- Central League Cup: 1977–78, 1979–80, 1983–84, 1987–88, 1989–90, 2004–05, 2008–09, 2010–11, 2012–13, 2015–16, 2017–18 (11)
- Central Sectional League Cup: 1983–84, 1987–88, 1990–91, 1992–93, 1996–97, 1999–2000, 2003–04, 2006–07, 2012–13 (9)
- SJFA Supercup: 2003–04, 2005–06
- Glasgow Junior Cup: 1941–42, 1953–54, 1961–62
- Glasgow Junior Consolation Cup: 1918, 1919
- Glasgow Dryburgh Cup: 1930–31, 1941–42, 1948–49
- Glasgow Intermediate Cup: 1931
- Glasgow North Eastern Cup: 1945, 1946
- Glasgow North Eastern Intermediate Cup: 1930
- Glasgow Semi-Jubilee Cup: 1912, 1921
- Glasgow Charity Cup: 1947, 1958
- Glasgow Challenge Cup: 1954, 1962
- Erskine Hospital Cup: 1954, 1958, 1972, 1973
- Kirkwood Shield: 1922, 1929, 1930, 1933, 1964, 1966
- Pompey Cup: 1959, 1962
- Scottish Intermediate League Cup: 1931
- Scottish Intermediate Consolation Cup: 1931

== Records ==
=== Club Records ===
Wins

- Record win: 13–0 v Saltcoats Victoria (16 September 2023)
- Record league win: 10–0 v Dumbarton Harp (4 August 1928)
- Record away win: 11–0 v Saltcoats Victoria (12 May 2018)
- Record Scottish Cup win: 6–0 v Girvan (27 August 2022) & Huntly (16 September 2022)
- Record West of Scotland Football League win: 9-1 v St Cadoc's (16 May 2026)
- Record Lowland League West win: 5-1 v Albion Rovers (26 September 2026)

Defeats

- Record defeat: 0–10 v Renfrew (3 June 1916), Greenock Morton Juniors (16 April 1936) & Maryhill (21 January 1956)
- Record home defeat: 1–8 v Greenock Juniors (28 November 1959)
- Record Scottish Cup defeat: 1-6 v Threave Rovers (31st October 2026)

Goals

- Most goals scored in a season: 187 in the 1944–45 season

=== Player Records ===
Top goalscorers

Name	Years	Goals
Willie Harris	1943 - 1952	371*
Tommy Armstrong	1920 – 21, 1928 – 31, 1940	212*
Adam Forde	2017 - 2025	127
Phil Smith	1968 - 1975	125
Wallace Lambie	1916 - 1932	123*
John O'Brien	1985 – 1992	121
Bryan Dingwall	2006 – 2010, 2010 – 2011	118
Colin Crichton	1988 - 1992	100
John Paisley	1991 - 1998	96
Sonny Best	1950 - 1954	92*
Stuart McCann	2017 - 2023, 2025 - Present	89
Gordon Wilson	1983 - 1993	88
Hugh McCallum	1968 - 1974	86
David Winters	2014 - 2017	83

*Due to incomplete records, actual figure may be higher

- First goal scorer - Sanny Brown v Kirkintilloch Harp, 1st August 1908
- First hat-trick - George Jamieson v Hampden XI (Queens Park), 19th December 1908

== Notable players ==
On settling the Intermediate dispute in 1931 Pollok sold the following players to senior football: J.McBride, J.Robertson and R.Griffiths to Chelsea; Charlie M. Thomson to Sunderland and T.Armstrong to Airdrieonians. Other Pollok players who have also played in the Scottish Football League or Football League include Brian Bilsland, Kevin Budinauckas, Ross O'Donoghue, Craig Cranmer, and Danny Diver. Former Pollok striker Dougie Arnott achieved Scottish Cup success with Motherwell. Players who have moved up to senior level from Pollok include John Sweeney – former Clyde captain, Arbroath keeper Scott Morrison, Airdrieonians assistant/player Paul Lovering and Albion Rovers defender Ross Dunlop.

Arguably Pollok's most notable former player, was Robert Prytz from Sweden, who played for the club between 1998 and 2000, helping them to win both the Central League and West Region Cups. Prior to this, he was capped 56 times for his country in a career that saw him turn out for clubs such as Malmo (where he played in the 1979 European Cup final defeat to Nottingham Forest), Rangers and Hellas Verona.

More recently, Clyde and former Hartlepool United midfielder Mouhamed Niang made thirty competitive appearances for Pollok from 2017 to 2018 having made the step up from the Pollok United Soccer Academy. The current club captain is Jamie Bain, who made 212 appearances for Airdrieonians, while current top scorer Bob McHugh turned out for Motherwell.

Notable former players
Player	Pollok career	Clubs
Bobby Collins	1947–49	Celtic, Everton, Leeds United, Scotland
Fraser Wishart	1981–83	Motherwell, St Mirren, Rangers
Gary Clark	1984 -85	Falkirk, Sliema Wanderers, Hamilton Academical
Chic Charnley	1984–87	Partick Thistle, St Mirren, Djurgårdens IF, Hibernian
Dougie Arnott	1985–86	Motherwell
Sandy Stewart	1986–87	Hearts, Airdrieonians, Kilmarnock, Partick Thistle
Ian Spittal	1995–98	Partick Thistle, Stranraer, Clyde
Robert Prytz	1998–2000	Malmö FF, Rangers, Sweden
Danny Diver	1996–98	Kolding IF, RC Tournai, Ayr United, Hamilton Academical, East Stirlingshire
Andy McLaren	2009	Dundee United, Reading, Kilmarnock, Greenock Morton, Scotland
John Sweeney	2010 – 14, 2015 -17	Kirkintilloch Rob Roy, Clyde, St Roch's
Carlo Monti	2012 – 13, 2016, 2026	Morton, Dundee, Żebbuġ Rangers, Qormi
Grant Evans	2016–22	Hamilton Academical, Greenock Morton, Airdrieonians, Dumbarton
Mouhamed Niang	2017–18	Partick Thistle, Montrose, Alloa Athletic, Hartlepool United, Cove Rangers, Dumbarton, Clyde
Grant Anderson	2023–24	Stenhousemuir, Hamilton Academical, Raith Rovers, Stranraer
Bob McHugh	2025 -	Motherwell, Falkirk, Greenock Morton, Queen's Park
Jamie Bain	2024 -	Airdrieonians, Brechin City, Clyde, Forfar Athletic

== Managers (1984–present) ==
Prior to the appointment of Dick Brock as manager in 1984, the club's Match Secretary was responsible for team affairs including signings and selections.

- Dick Brock (April 1984 – 1989–90)
- Tommy Reynolds (1989–90 – 1992–93)
- Jim George (1992–93 – 1994–95)
- Jim O'Donnell (1995–96 – June 1998)
- Andy Dailly (June 1998 – Mar 1999)
- Ronnie Lowrie (Mar 1999 – Apr 2004)
- Kevin O'Neil / Frannie McNeill (caretaker management): (April 2004 – June 2004)
- Rab Sneddon (June 2004 – June 2008)
- Jim Sinnet (June 2008 – April 2009)
- Harry Erwin / Mark McWilliams (caretaker management): (April 2009 – June 2009)
- Rab Sneddon (May 2009* – Feb 2010) (*took control for season 2009–10)
- Willie Irvine (March 2010 – October 2011)
- John Richardson (November 2011 -September 2013)
- Stephen Docherty (October 2013 – December 2013)
- Tony McInally (December 2013 – October 2018)
- Murdo MacKinnon (October 2018 – November 2022)
- Stewart Maxwell (November 2022 – Present)
