= 2023–24 in Scottish football =

127th season of competitive football in Scotland

Football in Scotland
- Season: 2023–24

2023–24 in Scottish football
- Premiership champions
- Celtic
- Championship champions
- Dundee United
- League 1 champions
- Falkirk
- League 2 champions
- Stenhousemuir
- Scottish Cup winners
- Celtic
- League Cup winners
- Rangers
- Challenge Cup winners
- Airdrieonians
- Youth Cup winners
- Rangers
- Teams in Europe
- Celtic, Rangers, Aberdeen, Heart of Midlothian, Hibernian
- Scotland national team
- UEFA Euro 2024 qualifying

The 2023–24 season was the 127th season of competitive football in Scotland. The domestic season began on 15 July with the first Scottish League Cup group stage matches, before the opening round of matches in the 2023–24 Scottish Premiership were played on 6 August.

== League competitions ==
=== Scottish Premiership ===
| Pos | Team | Pld | W | D | L | GF | GA | GD | Pts | Qualification or relegation (Note: Teams play each other three times (33 matches), before the league is split into two groups (the top six and the bottom six).) |
|---|---|---|---|---|---|---|---|---|---|---|
| 1 | Celtic (C) | 38 | 29 | 6 | 3 | 95 | 30 | +65 | 93 | Qualification for the Champions League league stage |
| 2 | Rangers | 38 | 27 | 4 | 7 | 87 | 32 | +55 | 85 | Qualification for the Champions League third qualifying round |
| 3 | Heart of Midlothian | 38 | 20 | 8 | 10 | 54 | 42 | +12 | 68 | Qualification for the Europa League play-off round (Note: As the winners of the 2023–24 Scottish Cup, Celtic, qualified for the Champions League, the berth reserved for the cup winners (Europa League play-off round) passed to the third-placed team. The berths for the Europa League second qualifying round and the Conference League second qualifying round were passed down to the fourth- and fifth-placed teams.) |
| 4 | Kilmarnock | 38 | 14 | 14 | 10 | 46 | 44 | +2 | 56 | Qualification for the Europa League second qualifying round |
| 5 | St Mirren | 38 | 13 | 8 | 17 | 46 | 52 | −6 | 47 | Qualification for the Conference League second qualifying round |
| 6 | Dundee | 38 | 10 | 12 | 16 | 49 | 68 | −19 | 42 | |
| 7 | Aberdeen | 38 | 12 | 12 | 14 | 48 | 52 | −4 | 48 | |
| 8 | Hibernian | 38 | 11 | 13 | 14 | 52 | 59 | −7 | 46 | |
| 9 | Motherwell | 38 | 10 | 13 | 15 | 56 | 59 | −3 | 43 | |
| 10 | St Johnstone | 38 | 8 | 11 | 19 | 29 | 54 | −25 | 35 | |
| 11 | Ross County (O) | 38 | 8 | 11 | 19 | 38 | 67 | −29 | 35 | Qualification for the Premiership play-off final |
| 12 | Livingston (R) | 38 | 5 | 10 | 23 | 29 | 70 | −41 | 25 | Relegation to Championship |

Rules for classification: 1) Points; 2) Goal difference; 3) Goals scored; 4) Head-to-Head points; 5) Head-to-Head goal difference; 6) Play-off (only if deciding champion, UEFA competitions qualification, second stage group allocation or relegation).
(C) Champions; (O) Play-off winners; (R) Relegated

=== Scottish Championship ===
| Pos | Team | Pld | W | D | L | GF | GA | GD | Pts | Promotion, qualification or relegation |
|---|---|---|---|---|---|---|---|---|---|---|
| 1 | Dundee United (C, P) | 36 | 22 | 9 | 5 | 73 | 23 | +50 | 75 | Promotion to the Premiership |
| 2 | Raith Rovers | 36 | 20 | 9 | 7 | 58 | 42 | +16 | 69 | Qualification for the Premiership play-off semi-final |
| 3 | Partick Thistle | 36 | 14 | 13 | 9 | 63 | 54 | +9 | 55 | Qualification for the Premiership play-off quarter-final |
| 4 | Airdrieonians | 36 | 15 | 7 | 14 | 44 | 44 | 0 | 52 | Qualification for the Premiership play-off quarter-final |
| 5 | Greenock Morton | 36 | 12 | 9 | 15 | 43 | 46 | −3 | 45 | |
| 6 | Dunfermline Athletic | 36 | 11 | 12 | 13 | 43 | 48 | −5 | 45 | |
| 7 | Ayr United | 36 | 12 | 8 | 16 | 53 | 61 | −8 | 44 | |
| 8 | Queen's Park | 36 | 11 | 10 | 15 | 50 | 56 | −6 | 43 | |
| 9 | Inverness Caledonian Thistle (R) | 36 | 10 | 12 | 14 | 41 | 40 | +1 | 42 | Qualification for the Championship play-offs |
| 10 | Arbroath (R) | 36 | 6 | 5 | 25 | 35 | 89 | −54 | 23 | Relegation to League One |

Rules for classification: 1) Points; 2) Goal difference; 3) Goals scored; 4) Head-to-to head points; 5) Head-to-head goal difference; 6) Play-off (only for deciding promotion, play-off participation and relegation).
(C) Champions; (P) Promoted; (R) Relegated

=== Scottish League One ===
| Pos | Team | Pld | W | D | L | GF | GA | GD | Pts | Promotion, qualification or relegation |
|---|---|---|---|---|---|---|---|---|---|---|
| 1 | Falkirk (C, P) | 36 | 27 | 9 | 0 | 96 | 28 | +68 | 90 | Promotion to the Championship |
| 2 | Hamilton Academical (O, P) | 36 | 22 | 8 | 6 | 73 | 28 | +45 | 74 | Qualification for the Championship play-offs |
| 3 | Alloa Athletic | 36 | 16 | 8 | 12 | 60 | 55 | +5 | 56 | Qualification for the Championship play-offs |
| 4 | Montrose | 36 | 15 | 8 | 13 | 58 | 57 | +1 | 53 | Qualification for the Championship play-offs |
| 5 | Cove Rangers | 36 | 14 | 7 | 15 | 58 | 63 | −5 | 49 | |
| 6 | Kelty Hearts | 36 | 12 | 8 | 16 | 48 | 63 | −15 | 44 | |
| 7 | Queen of the South | 36 | 11 | 8 | 17 | 46 | 53 | −7 | 41 | |
| 8 | Annan Athletic | 36 | 9 | 12 | 15 | 55 | 68 | −13 | 39 | |
| 9 | Stirling Albion (R) | 36 | 10 | 9 | 17 | 39 | 58 | −19 | 39 | Qualification for the League One play-offs |
| 10 | Edinburgh City (R) | 36 | 3 | 5 | 28 | 38 | 98 | −60 | 8 (Note: On 25 January 2024, Edinburgh City were deducted 6 points, having failed to pay its players’ wages on time and defaulting its tax obligations to HMRC, as well as not engaging fully in the disciplinary process leading to further breaches of SPFL Rules.) | Relegation to League Two |

Rules for classification: 1) Points; 2) Goal difference; 3) Goals scored; 4) Head-to-to head points; 5) Head-to-head goal difference; 6) Play-off (only for deciding promotion, play-off participation and relegation).
(C) Champions; (O) Play-off winners; (P) Promoted; (R) Relegated

=== Scottish League Two ===
| Pos | Team | Pld | W | D | L | GF | GA | GD | Pts | Promotion, qualification or relegation |
|---|---|---|---|---|---|---|---|---|---|---|
| 1 | Stenhousemuir (C, P) | 36 | 18 | 14 | 4 | 50 | 31 | +19 | 68 | Promotion to League One |
| 2 | Peterhead | 36 | 16 | 12 | 8 | 58 | 39 | +19 | 60 | Qualification for the League One play-offs |
| 3 | The Spartans | 36 | 15 | 13 | 8 | 53 | 43 | +10 | 58 | Qualification for the League One play-offs |
| 4 | Dumbarton (O, P) | 36 | 16 | 9 | 11 | 56 | 44 | +12 | 57 | Qualification for the League One play-offs |
| 5 | East Fife | 36 | 11 | 11 | 14 | 46 | 47 | −1 | 44 | |
| 6 | Forfar Athletic | 36 | 9 | 15 | 12 | 38 | 45 | −7 | 42 | |
| 7 | Elgin City | 36 | 10 | 10 | 16 | 35 | 59 | −24 | 40 | |
| 8 | Bonnyrigg Rose | 36 | 9 | 12 | 15 | 47 | 48 | −1 | 39 | |
| 9 | Clyde | 36 | 9 | 11 | 16 | 46 | 58 | −12 | 38 | |
| 10 | Stranraer (O) | 36 | 9 | 9 | 18 | 38 | 53 | −15 | 36 | Qualification for the League Two play-off final |

Rules for classification: 1) Points; 2) Goal difference; 3) Goals scored; 4) Head-to-to head points; 5) Head-to-head goal difference; 6) Play-off (only for deciding promotion, play-off participation and relegation).
(C) Champions; (O) Play-off winners; (P) Promoted

=== Non-league football ===
==== Level 5 ====
Highland Football League
| Pos | Team | Pld | Pts |
|---|---|---|---|
| 1 | Buckie Thistle (C) | 34 | 81 |
| 2 | Brechin City | 34 | 81 |
| 3 | Fraserburgh | 34 | 78 |
| 4 | Banks o' Dee | 34 | 72 |
| 5 | Formartine United | 34 | 72 |
| 6 | Brora Rangers | 34 | 59 |
| 7 | Huntly | 34 | 54 |
| 8 | Nairn County | 34 | 53 |
| 9 | Turriff United | 34 | 48 |
| 10 | Inverurie Loco Works | 34 | 44 |
| 11 | Rothes | 34 | 37 |
| 12 | Wick Academy | 34 | 36 |
| 13 | Keith | 34 | 33 |
| 14 | Forres Mechanics | 34 | 30 |
| 15 | Lossiemouth | 34 | 29 |
| 16 | Deveronvale | 34 | 25 |
| 17 | Clachnacuddin | 34 | 23 |
| 18 | Strathspey Thistle | 34 | 10 |

(C) Champions

Lowland Football League
| Pos | Team | Pld | Pts |
|---|---|---|---|
| 1 | East Kilbride (C) | 34 | 81 |
| 2 | Heart of Midlothian B | 34 | 69 |
| 3 | Bo'ness United | 34 | 67 |
| 4 | Cumbernauld Colts | 34 | 65 |
| 5 | Tranent | 34 | 60 |
| 6 | Celtic B | 34 | 59 |
| 7 | Civil Service Strollers | 34 | 56 |
| 8 | Linlithgow Rose | 34 | 50 |
| 9 | Albion Rovers | 34 | 46 |
| 10 | Cowdenbeath | 34 | 46 |
| 11 | University of Stirling | 34 | 46 |
| 12 | Caledonian Braves | 34 | 45 |
| 13 | Berwick Rangers | 34 | 42 |
| 14 | East Stirlingshire | 34 | 40 |
| 15 | Broomhill | 34 | 39 |
| 16 | Gala Fairydean Rovers | 34 | 32 |
| 17 | Gretna 2008 | 34 | 12 |
| 18 | Edinburgh University (R) | 34 | 9 |

Source: SLFL BBC Sport Soccerway
(C) Champions;
(R) Relegated

==== Level 6 ====
===== Highland =====
Midlands Football League
| Pos | Team | Pld | Pts |
|---|---|---|---|
| 1 | Dundee North End (C) | 38 | 104 |
| 2 | Broughty Athletic | 38 | 103 |
| 3 | Lochee United | 38 | 93 |
| 4 | Downfield | 38 | 88 |
| 5 | Carnoustie Panmure | 38 | 77 |
| 6 | Kirriemuir Thistle | 38 | 71 |
| 7 | East Craigie | 38 | 67 |
| 8 | Montrose Roselea | 38 | 57 |
| 9 | Tayport | 38 | 56 |
| 10 | Dundee St James | 38 | 55 |
| 11 | Dundee Violet | 38 | 48 |
| 12 | Letham | 38 | 46 |
| 13 | Scone Thistle | 38 | 41 |
| 14 | Blairgowrie | 38 | 36 |
| 15 | Lochee Harp | 38 | 30 |
| 16 | Brechin Victoria | 38 | 29 |
| 17 | Arbroath Victoria | 38 | 28 |
| 18 | Forfar West End | 38 | 27 |
| 19 | Coupar Angus | 38 | 17 |
| 20 | Forfar United | 38 | 16 |

(C) Champions

North Caledonian Football League
| Pos | Team | Pld | Pts |
|---|---|---|---|
| 1 | Invergordon (C) | 22 | 57 |
| 2 | Loch Ness | 22 | 51 |
| 3 | Halkirk United | 22 | 47 |
| 4 | Golspie Sutherland | 22 | 43 |
| 5 | Fort William | 22 | 41 |
| 6 | St Duthus | 22 | 29 |
| 7 | Inverness Athletic | 22 | 23 |
| 8 | Orkney | 22 | 23 |
| 9 | Clachnacuddin Reserves | 22 | 20 |
| 10 | Alness United | 22 | 19 |
| 11 | Thurso | 22 | 16 |
| 12 | Bonar Bridge | 22 | 13 |

Source: North Caledonian Football League
(C) Champions

North Region Premier League
| Pos | Team | Pld | Pts |
|---|---|---|---|
| 1 | Culter (C) | 30 | 77 |
| 2 | Bridge of Don Thistle | 30 | 63 |
| 3 | Dyce | 30 | 63 |
| 4 | Hermes | 30 | 56 |
| 5 | Rothie Rovers | 30 | 48 |
| 6 | Ellon United | 30 | 47 |
| 7 | Fraserburgh United | 30 | 43 |
| 8 | Sunnybank | 30 | 40 |
| 9 | Stonehaven | 30 | 36 |
| 10 | Maud | 30 | 36 |
| 11 | Newmachar United | 30 | 33 |
| 12 | Buchanhaven Hearts | 30 | 31 |
| 13 | Colony Park | 30 | 31 |
| 14 | East End (O) | 30 | 30 |
| 15 | Nairn St Ninian (R) | 30 | 20 |
| 16 | Stoneywood Parkvale (R) | 30 | 6 |

(C) Champions;
(O) Play-off winners;
(R) Relegated

===== Lowland =====
East of Scotland Football League
| Pos | Team | Pld | Pts |
|---|---|---|---|
| 1 | Broxburn Athletic (C, O, P) | 30 | 74 |
| 2 | Musselburgh Athletic | 30 | 63 |
| 3 | Jeanfield Swifts | 30 | 60 |
| 4 | Dunbar United | 30 | 56 |
| 5 | Hutchison Vale | 30 | 55 |
| 6 | Sauchie Juniors | 30 | 54 |
| 7 | Hill of Beath Hawthorn | 30 | 50 |
| 8 | Haddington Athletic | 30 | 44 |
| 9 | Dundonald Bluebell | 30 | 43 |
| 10 | Tynecastle | 30 | 37 |
| 11 | Penicuik Athletic | 30 | 35 |
| 12 | Luncarty | 30 | 28 |
| 13 | Glenrothes | 30 | 27 |
| 14 | Inverkeithing Hillfield Swifts (R) | 30 | 24 |
| 15 | Crossgates Primrose (R) | 30 | 20 |
| 16 | Kinnoull (R) | 30 | 12 |

Source: eosfl.com
(C) Champions;
(O) Play-off winners;
(P) Promoted;
(R) Relegated

South of Scotland Football League
| Pos | Team | Pld | Pts |
|---|---|---|---|
| 1 | Dalbeattie Star (C) | 22 | 54 |
| 2 | Creetown | 22 | 52 |
| 3 | Newton Stewart | 22 | 50 |
| 4 | Abbey Vale | 22 | 48 |
| 5 | Lochar Thistle | 22 | 42 |
| 6 | Stranraer reserves | 22 | 37 |
| 7 | Nithsdale Wanderers | 22 | 36 |
| 8 | Mid-Annandale | 22 | 25 |
| 9 | Upper Annandale | 22 | 14 |
| 10 | Lochmaben | 22 | 10 |
| 11 | St Cuthbert Wanderers | 22 | 7 |
| 12 | Wigtown & Bladnoch | 22 | 5 |

(C) Champions

West of Scotland Football League
| Pos | Team | Pld | Pts |
|---|---|---|---|
| 1 | Beith Juniors (C) | 30 | 60 |
| 2 | Auchinleck Talbot | 30 | 55 |
| 3 | St Cadoc's | 30 | 54 |
| 4 | Clydebank | 30 | 54 |
| 5 | Largs Thistle | 30 | 53 |
| 6 | Pollok | 30 | 50 |
| 7 | Darvel | 30 | 48 |
| 8 | Cumnock Juniors | 30 | 41 |
| 9 | Hurlford United | 30 | 40 |
| 10 | Gartcairn | 30 | 38 |
| 11 | Benburb | 30 | 38 |
| 12 | Troon | 30 | 36 |
| 13 | Glenafton Athletic | 30 | 33 |
| 14 | Arthurlie (R) | 30 | 32 |
| 15 | Kirkintilloch Rob Roy (R) | 30 | 27 |
| 16 | Irvine Meadow XI (R) | 30 | 13 |

Source: West of Scotland Football League
(C) Champions;
(R) Relegated

== Honours ==
=== Cup honours ===
| Competition | Winner | Score | Runner-up | Match report |
|---|---|---|---|---|
| 2023–24 Scottish Cup | Celtic | 1–0 | Rangers | BBC Sport |
| 2023–24 League Cup | Rangers | 1–0 | Aberdeen | BBC Sport |
| 2023–24 Challenge Cup | Airdrieonians | 2–1 | The New Saints | BBC Sport |
| 2023–24 South Challenge Cup | East Kilbride | 2–0 | Kirkintilloch Rob Roy | Daily Record |
| 2023–24 Youth Cup | Rangers | 2–1 | Aberdeen | BBC Sport |
| 2023–24 Junior Cup | Darvel | 2–1 | Arthurlie | Daily Record |

=== Non-league honours ===
| Level | Competition | Winner |
|---|---|---|
| 5 | Highland League | Buckie Thistle |
| 5 | Lowland League | East Kilbride |
| 6 | Midlands League | Dundee North End |
| 6 | North Caledonian League | Invergordon |
| 6 | North Region Premier League | Culter |
| 6 | East of Scotland League Premier Division | Broxburn Athletic |
| 6 | South of Scotland League | Dalbeattie Star |
| 6 | West of Scotland League Premier Division | Beith Juniors |
| 7 | North Championship | Islavale |
| 7 | East of Scotland League First Division | Dunipace |
| 7 | West of Scotland League First Division | Drumchapel United |
8
| 8 | East of Scotland League Second Division | Bo'ness Athletic |
| 8 | West of Scotland League Second Division | Ardrossan Winton Rovers |
| 9 | East of Scotland League Third Division | West Calder United |
| 9 | West of Scotland League Third Division | Lanark United |
| 10 | West of Scotland League Fourth Division | Glenvale |

=== Individual honours ===
==== PFA Scotland awards ====
| Award | Winner | Team |
|---|---|---|
| Players' Player of the Year | Lawrence Shankland | Heart of Midlothian |
| Young Player of the Year | David Watson | Kilmarnock |
| Manager of the Year | John McGlynn | Falkirk |
| Championship Player | Brian Graham | Partick Thistle |
| League One Player | Callumn Morrison | Falkirk |
| League Two Player | Gregor Buchanan | Stenhousemuir |

==== SFWA awards ====
| Award | Winner | Team |
|---|---|---|
| Footballer of the Year | Lawrence Shankland | Heart of Midlothian |
| Young Player of the Year | David Watson | Kilmarnock |
| Manager of the Year | Derek McInnes | Kilmarnock |

== Scottish clubs in Europe ==
=== Summary ===
| Club | Competitions | Started round | Final round | Coef. |
|---|---|---|---|---|
| Celtic | UEFA Champions League | Group stage | | 7.0 |
| Rangers | UEFA Champions League | Third qualifying round | Play-off round | 16.0 |
| Rangers | UEFA Europa League | Group stage | Last 16 | 16.0 |
| Aberdeen | UEFA Europa League | Play-off round | | 5.5 |
| Aberdeen | UEFA Europa Conference League | Group stage | | 5.5 |
| Heart of Midlothian | UEFA Europa Conference League | Third qualifying round | Play-off round | 1.0 |
| Hibernian | UEFA Europa Conference League | Second qualifying round | Play-off round | 2.5 |
| Total | | | | 32.0 |
| Average | | | | 6.4 |

=== Celtic ===
UEFA Champions League

| Pos | Team | Pld | W | D | L | GF | GA | GD | Pts | Qualification | ATM | LAZ | FEY | CEL |
|---|---|---|---|---|---|---|---|---|---|---|---|---|---|---|
| 1 | (Spain) Atlético Madrid | 6 | 4 | 2 | 0 | 17 | 6 | +11 | 14 | Advance to knockout phase | — | 2–0 | 3–2 | 6–0 |
| 2 | (Italy) Lazio | 6 | 3 | 1 | 2 | 7 | 7 | 0 | 10 | Advance to knockout phase | 1–1 | — | 1–0 | 2–0 |
| 3 | (Netherlands) Feyenoord | 6 | 2 | 0 | 4 | 9 | 10 | −1 | 6 | Transfer to Europa League | 1–3 | 3–1 | — | 2–0 |
| 4 | (Scotland) Celtic | 6 | 1 | 1 | 4 | 5 | 15 | −10 | 4 | | 2–2 | 1–2 | 2–1 | — |

Source: UEFA
Rules for classification: Group stage tiebreakers

Having won the Premiership, Celtic qualified for the Champions League and entered in the group stage. They were drawn in Group E with Feyenoord, Atletico Madrid and Lazio.

| 19 September 2023 Group E | Feyenoord (Netherlands) | 2–0 | (Scotland) Celtic | Rotterdam |
| 20:00 BST | Stengs 45+2'; Jahanbakhsh 76' | Report | | Stadium: De Kuip; Attendance: 44,008; Referee: Irfan Peljto (Bosnia and Herzegovina) |

| 4 October 2023 Group E | Celtic (Scotland) | 1–2 | (Italy) Lazio | Glasgow |
| 20:00 BST | Furuhashi 12' | Report | Vecino 29'; Pedro 90+5' | Stadium: Celtic Park; Attendance: 56,063; Referee: Donatas Rumšas (Lithuania) |

| 25 October 2023 Group E | Celtic (Scotland) | 2–2 | (Spain) Atlético Madrid | Glasgow |
| 20:00 BST | Furuhashi 4'; Palma 28' | Report | Griezmann 25'; Morata 53' | Stadium: Celtic Park; Attendance: 55,844; Referee: Felix Zwayer (Germany) |

| 7 November 2023 Group E | Atlético Madrid (Spain) | 6–0 | (Scotland) Celtic | Madrid |
| 20:00 GMT | Griezmann 6', 60'; Morata 45+2', 76'; Lino 66'; Saúl 84' | Report | | Stadium: Metropolitano Stadium; Attendance: 60,863; Referee: Ivan Kružliak (Slovakia) |

| 28 November 2023 Group E | Lazio (Italy) | 2–0 | (Scotland) Celtic | Rome |
| 17:45 GMT | Immobile 82', 85' | Report | | Stadium: Stadio Olimpico; Attendance: 50,555; Referee: Halil Umut Meler (Turkey) |

| 13 December 2023 Group E | Celtic (Scotland) | 2–1 | (Netherlands) Feyenoord | Glasgow |
| 20:00 GMT | Palma 33' (pen.); Lagerbielke 90+1' | Report | Minteh 82' | Stadium: Celtic Park; Referee: Benoît Bastien (France) |

=== Rangers ===
UEFA Champions League

Having finished in second place of the Premiership, Rangers qualified for the Champions League and entered in the third qualifying round.

| 9 August 2023 QR3 | Rangers (Scotland) | 2–1 | (Switzerland) Servette | Glasgow |
| 19:45 BST | Tavernier 6' (pen.); Dessers 15' | Report | Bedia 44' (pen.) | Stadium: Ibrox Stadium; Attendance: 48,956; Referee: Donatas Rumsas (Lithuania) |

| 15 August 2023 QR3 | Servette (Switzerland) | 1–1 (2–3 agg.) | (Scotland) Rangers | Lancy |
| 19:30 BST | Kutesa 22' | Report | Tavernier 50' | Stadium: Stade de Genève; Attendance: 26,000; Referee: Maurizio Mariani (Italy) |

| 22 August 2023 PO | Rangers (Scotland) | 2–2 | (Netherlands) PSV Eindhoven | Glasgow |
| 20:00 BST | Sima 45'; Matondo 76' | Report | Sangaré 61' de Jong 80' | Stadium: Ibrox Stadium; Attendance: 47,537; Referee: Clément Turpin (France) |

| 30 August 2023 PO | PSV Eindhoven (Netherlands) | 5–1 (7–3 agg.) | (Scotland) Rangers | Eindhoven |
| 20:00 BST | Saibari 35', 53' de Jong 66'; Veerman 78'; Goldson 81' (o.g.) | Report | Tavernier 64' | Stadium: Philips Stadion; Attendance: 34,560; Referee: José María Sánchez Martínez (Spain) |

UEFA Europa League

Having lost in the Champions League play-off, Rangers dropped into the Europa League and were drawn in Group C with Real Betis, Sparta Prague and Aris Limassol.

| Pos | Team | Pld | W | D | L | GF | GA | GD | Pts | Qualification | RAN | SPP | BET | ALI |
|---|---|---|---|---|---|---|---|---|---|---|---|---|---|---|
| 1 | (Scotland) Rangers | 6 | 3 | 2 | 1 | 8 | 6 | +2 | 11 | Advance to round of 16 | — | 2–1 | 1–0 | 1–1 |
| 2 | (Czech Republic) Sparta Prague | 6 | 3 | 1 | 2 | 9 | 7 | +2 | 10 | Advance to knockout round play-offs | 0–0 | — | 1–0 | 3–2 |
| 3 | (Spain) Real Betis | 6 | 3 | 0 | 3 | 9 | 7 | +2 | 9 | Transfer to Europa Conference League | 2–3 | 2–1 | — | 4–1 |
| 4 | (Cyprus) Aris Limassol | 6 | 1 | 1 | 4 | 7 | 13 | −6 | 4 | | 2–1 | 1–3 | 0–1 | — |

Source: UEFA
Rules for classification: Group stage tiebreakers

| 21 September 2023 Group C | Rangers (Scotland) | 1–0 | (Spain) Real Betis | Glasgow |
| 20:00 BST | Sima 67' | Report | | Stadium: Ibrox Stadium; Attendance: 45,634; Referee: Lawrence Visser (Belgium) |

| 5 October 2023 Group C | Aris Limassol (Cyprus) | 2–1 | (Scotland) Rangers | Limassol |
| 17:45 BST | Moucketou-Moussounda 9'; Babicka 59' | Report | Sima 70' | Stadium: Alphamega Stadium; Attendance: 3,911; Referee: Horațiu Feșnic (Romania) |

| 26 October 2023 Group C | Sparta Prague (Czech Republic) | 0–0 | (Scotland) Rangers | Prague |
| 17:45 BST | | Report | | Stadium: Stadion Letná; Referee: Sascha Stegemann (Germany) |

| 9 November 2023 Group C | Rangers (Scotland) | 2–1 | (Czech Republic) Sparta Prague | Glasgow |
| 20:00 GMT | Danilo 11'; Cantwell 20' | Report | Haraslín 77' | Stadium: Ibrox Stadium; Attendance: 48,838; Referee: Davide Massa (Italy) |

| 30 November 2023 Group C | Rangers (Scotland) | 1–1 | (Cyprus) Aris Limassol | Glasgow |
| 20:00 GMT | McCausland 49' | Report | Shavy Babicka 28' | Stadium: Ibrox Stadium; Referee: Rohit Saggi (Norway) |

| 14 December 2023 Group C | Real Betis (Spain) | 2–3 | (Scotland) Rangers | Seville |
| 20:00 GMT | Miranda 14'; Pérez 37' | Report | Sima 10'; Dessers 20'; Roofe 78' | Stadium: Benito Villamarín; Referee: Srđan Jovanović (Serbia) |

Having won their group, Rangers received a bye to the last 16 of the Europa League.

| 7 March 2024 Last 16 | Benfica (Portugal) | 2–2 | (Scotland) Rangers | Lisbon |
| 20:00 GMT | Di Maria 45+2' (pen.); Goldson 67' (o.g.) | Report | Lawrence 7'; Sterling 45+5' | Stadium: Estádio da Luz; Attendance: 48,579; Referee: Tobias Stieler (Germany) |

| 14 March 2024 Last 16 | Rangers (Scotland) | 0–1 (2–3 agg.) | (Portugal) Benfica | Glasgow |
| 17:45 GMT | | Report | R. Silva 66' | Stadium: Ibrox Stadium; Attendance: 49,943; Referee: Ivan Kružliak (Slovakia) |

=== Aberdeen ===
Having finished in third place of the Premiership, Aberdeen qualified for the Europa League and entered in the play-off round.

| 24 August 2023 PO | BK Hacken (Sweden) | 2–2 | (Scotland) Aberdeen | Gothenburg |
| 18:00 BST | Layouni 36'; Sadiq 69' (pen.) | Report | Miovski 75'; Devlin 79' | Stadium: Bravida Arena; Attendance: 4,424; Referee: Filip Glova (Slovakia) |

| 31 August 2023 PO | Aberdeen (Scotland) | 1–3 (3–5 agg.) | (Sweden) BK Hacken | Aberdeen |
| 19:45 BST | Miovski 55' (pen.) | Report | Sadiq 14', 41'; Layouni 81' (pen.) | Stadium: Pittodrie Stadium; Attendance: 19,237; Referee: Daniel Siebert (Germany) |

UEFA Europa Conference League

Having lost in the Europa League play-off, Aberdeen dropped into the Europa Conference League and were drawn in Group G with Eintracht Frankfurt, PAOK and HJK Helsinki.

| Pos | Team | Pld | W | D | L | GF | GA | GD | Pts | Qualification | PAOK | FRA | ABE | HJK |
|---|---|---|---|---|---|---|---|---|---|---|---|---|---|---|
| 1 | (Greece) PAOK | 6 | 5 | 1 | 0 | 16 | 10 | +6 | 16 | Advance to round of 16 | — | 2–1 | 2–2 | 4–2 |
| 2 | (Germany) Eintracht Frankfurt | 6 | 3 | 0 | 3 | 11 | 7 | +4 | 9 | Advance to knockout round play-offs | 1–2 | — | 2–1 | 6–0 |
| 3 | (Scotland) Aberdeen | 6 | 1 | 3 | 2 | 10 | 10 | 0 | 6 | | 2–3 | 2–0 | — | 1–1 |
| 4 | (Finland) HJK | 6 | 0 | 2 | 4 | 7 | 17 | −10 | 2 | | 2–3 | 0–1 | 2–2 | — |

Source: UEFA
Rules for classification: Group stage tiebreakers

| 21 September 2023 Group G | Eintracht Frankfurt (Germany) | 2–1 | (Scotland) Aberdeen | Frankfurt |
| 17:45 BST | Marmoush 11' (pen.); Koch 61' | Report | Polvara 22' | Stadium: Waldstadion; Attendance: 55,500; Referee: Chrysovalantis Theouli (Cyprus) |

| 5 October 2023 Group G | Aberdeen (Scotland) | 1–1 | (Finland) HJK | Aberdeen |
| 20:00 BST | Miovski 79' | Report | Radulovic 59' | Stadium: Pittodrie Stadium; Attendance: 16,316; Referee: Daniel Stefański (Poland) |

| 26 October 2023 Group G | Aberdeen (Scotland) | 2–3 | (Greece) PAOK | Aberdeen |
| 20:00 BST | Miovski 50'; Polvara 58' | Report | Despodov 73'; Vieirinha 84'; Schwab 90+6' (pen.) | Stadium: Pittodrie Stadium; Attendance: 16,089; Referee: Sebastian Gishamer (Austria) |

| 9 November 2023 Group G | PAOK (Greece) | 2–2 | (Scotland) Aberdeen | Thessaloniki |
| 17:45 GMT | Taison 23'; Samatta 67' | Report | Duk 14'; McGrath 70' | Stadium: Toumba Stadium; Attendance: 19,019; Referee: Juxhin Xhaja (Albania) |

| 30 November 2023 Group G | HJK (Finland) | 2–2 | (Scotland) Aberdeen | Helsinki |
| 17:45 GMT | Bandé 16'; Hostikka 33' | Report | MacDonald 41'; Duk 56' | Stadium: Bolt Arena; Referee: Genc Nuza (Kosovo) |

| 14 December 2023 Group G | Aberdeen (Scotland) | 2–0 | (Germany) Eintracht Frankfurt | Aberdeen |
| 17:45 GMT | Duk 41'; Sokler 74' | Report | | Stadium: Pittodrie Stadium; Referee: Miguel Nogueira (Portugal) |

=== Heart of Midlothian ===
UEFA Europa Conference League

Having finished in fourth place of the Premiership, Hearts qualified for the Europa Conference League and entered in the third qualifying round.

| 10 August 2023 QR3 | Rosenborg BK (Norway) | 2–1 | (Scotland) Heart of Midlothian | Trondheim |
| 18:00 BST | Frederiksen 14'; Nelson 45+1' | Report | Shankland 78' | Stadium: Lerkendal Stadion; Attendance: 11,882; Referee: Andrei Chivulete (Romania) |

| 17 August 2023 QR3 | Heart of Midlothian (Scotland) | 3–1 (4–3 agg.) | (Norway) Rosenborg BK | Edinburgh |
| 19:45 BST | Shankland 13'; Devlin 50', 90+2' | Report | Thorvaldsson 5' | Stadium: Tynecastle Park; Attendance: 17,942; Referee: David Fuxman (Israel) |

| 24 August 2023 PO | Heart of Midlothian (Scotland) | 1–2 | (Greece) PAOK | Edinburgh |
| 19:45 BST | Shankland 9' (pen.) | Report | Schwab 12' (pen.); A. Živković 75' | Stadium: Tynecastle Park; Attendance: 17,409; Referee: Andris Treimanis (Latvia) |

| 31 August 2023 PO | PAOK (Greece) | 4–0 (6–1 agg.) | (Scotland) Heart of Midlothian | Thessaloniki |
| 18:30 BST | Taison 16', 71'; Brandon 23'; Konstantelias 57' | Report | | Stadium: Toumba Stadium; Attendance: 19,032; Referee: Guillermo Cuadra Fernández (Spain) |

=== Hibernian ===
UEFA Europa Conference League

Having finished in fifth place of the Premiership, Hibs qualified for the Europa Conference League and entered in the second qualifying round.

| 27 July 2023 QR2 | Inter Club d'Escaldes (Andorra) | 2–1 | (Scotland) Hibernian | Andorra la Vella |
| 16:00 BST | Gallego 15'; Assoubre 71' | Report | Newell 90+1' | Stadium: Estadi Comunal; Attendance: 223; Referee: Joni Hyytiä (Finland) |

| 3 August 2023 QR2 | Hibernian (Scotland) | 6–1 (7–3 agg.) | (Andorra) Inter Club d'Escaldes | Edinburgh |
| 19:15 BST | Boyle 10', 21'; Doidge 29'; Campbell 48', 61'; Youan 65' | Report | De la Torre 83' | Stadium: Easter Road; Attendance: 13,840; Referee: Peter Kralovic (Slovakia) |

| 10 August 2023 QR3 | Hibernian (Scotland) | 3–1 | (Switzerland) Luzern | Edinburgh |
| 19:30 BST | Newell 46'; Vente 72'; Obita 90' | Report | Beka 56' | Stadium: Easter Road; Attendance: 13,075; Referee: Robertas Valikonis (Lithuania) |

| 17 August 2023 QR3 | Luzern (Switzerland) | 2–2 (3–5 agg.) | (Scotland) Hibernian | Luzern |
| 19:45 BST | Kadák 16'; Ademi 67' | Report | Youan 10'; Boyle 73' | Stadium: Swissporarena; Attendance: 13,987; Referee: Aristotelis Diamantopoulos (Greece) |

| 23 August 2023 PO | Hibernian (Scotland) | 0–5 | (England) Aston Villa | Edinburgh |
| 17:45 BST | | Report | Watkins 17', 33', 48'; Bailey 42'; Luiz 74' (pen.) | Stadium: Easter Road; Attendance: 19,306; Referee: Ricardo de Burgos Bengoetxea (Spain) |

| 31 August 2023 PO | Aston Villa (England) | 3–0 (8–0 agg.) | (Scotland) Hibernian | Birmingham |
| 20:00 BST | Duran 11'; Bailey 34'; Cash 61' | Report | | Stadium: Villa Park; Attendance: 39,467; Referee: Luca Pairetto (Italy) |

== Scotland national team ==
Scotland qualified for UEFA Euro 2024, after a 1–0 win for Spain against Norway on 15 October 2023 meant that they were guaranteed to finish in a qualifying position.

| 8 September 2023 Euro 2024 qualifying | Cyprus | 0–3 | Scotland | Larnaca |
| | | Report | McTominay 6'; Porteous 16'; McGinn 30' | Stadium: AEK Arena; Attendance: 6,633; Referee: Balazs Berke (Hungary) |

| 12 September 2023 Friendly match | Scotland | 1–3 | England | Glasgow |
| | Maguire 67' (o.g.) | | Foden 32'; Bellingham 35'; Kane 81' | Stadium: Hampden Park; Attendance: 49,129; Referee: Davide Massa (Italy) |

| 12 October 2023 Euro 2024 qualifying | Spain | 2–0 | Scotland | Seville |
| | Morata 73'; Sancet 86' | Report | | Stadium: Estadio de La Cartuja; Attendance: 45,623; Referee: Serdar Gözübüyük (Netherlands) |

| 17 October 2023 Friendly match | France | 4–1 | Scotland | Lille |
| | Pavard 16', 24'; Mbappe 41' (pen.); Coman 70' | Report | Gilmour 11' | Stadium: Stade Pierre-Mauroy; Attendance: 44,000; Referee: Tobias Stieler (Germany) |

| 16 November 2023 Euro 2024 qualifying | Georgia | 2–2 | Scotland | Tbilisi |
| | Kvaratskhelia 15', 57' | Report | McTominay 49'; Shankland 90+2' | Stadium: Boris Paichadze Dinamo Arena; Attendance: 44,595; Referee: Aleksandar Stavrev (North Macedonia) |

| 19 November 2023 Euro 2024 qualifying | Scotland | 3–3 | Norway | Glasgow |
| | McGinn 13'; Østigård 33' (o.g.); Armstrong 59' | Report | Dønnum 3'; Larsen 20'; Elyounoussi 86' | Stadium: Hampden Park; Attendance: 48,318; Referee: Horațiu Feșnic (Romania) |

| 22 March 2024 Friendly match | Netherlands | 4–0 | Scotland | Amsterdam |
| | Reijnders 40'; Wijnaldum 72'; Weghorst 84'; Malen 86' | Report | | Stadium: Johan Cruyff Arena; Attendance: 46,223; Referee: Erik Lambrechts (Belgium) |

| 26 March 2024 Friendly match | Scotland | 0–1 | Northern Ireland | Glasgow |
| | | Report | Bradley 32' | Stadium: Hampden Park; Attendance: 33,452; Referee: Robert Jones (England) |

| 3 June 2024 Friendly match | Gibraltar | 0–2 | Scotland | Faro/Loulé |
| | | Report | Christie 58'; Adams 85' | Stadium: Estadio Algarve; Referee: J. Robinson (Northern Ireland) |

| 7 June 2024 Friendly match | Scotland | 2–2 | Finland | Glasgow |
| | Hoskonen 54' (o.g.); Shankland 58' | Report | Kallman 72'; Antman 85' (pen.) | Stadium: Hampden Park; Referee: Łukasz Kuźma (Poland) |

| 14 June 2024 Euro 2024 | Germany | 5–1 | Scotland | Munich |
| | Wirtz 10'; Musiala 19'; Havertz 45+1' (pen.); Füllkrug 68'; Can 90+3' | Report | Rüdiger 87' (o.g.) | Stadium: Allianz Arena; Attendance: 65,052; Referee: Clément Turpin (France) |

| 19 June 2024 Euro 2024 | Scotland | 1–1 | Switzerland | Cologne |
| | McTominay 13' | Report | Shaqiri 26' | Stadium: RheinEnergieStadion; Attendance: 42,711; Referee: Ivan Kružliak (Slovakia) |

| 23 June 2024 Euro 2024 | Scotland | 0–1 | Hungary | Stuttgart |
| | | Report | Csoboth 90+10' | Stadium: MHPArena; Attendance: 54,000; Referee: Facundo Tello (Argentina) |

== Women's football ==
=== League and Cup honours ===
| Division | Winner |
|---|---|
| 2023–24 SWPL 1 | Celtic |
| 2023–24 SWPL 2 | Queen's Park |
| 2023–24 SWF Championship | Rossvale |
| 2023–24 SWF League One | Stenhousemuir |

| Competition | Winner | Score | Runner-up | Match report |
|---|---|---|---|---|
| 2023–24 Scottish Women's Cup | Rangers | 2–0 | Heart of Midlothian | BBC Sport |
| 2023–24 SWPL Cup | Rangers | 4–1 | Partick Thistle | |
| SWF Championship Cup | Rossvale | 1–0 (Note: After extra time) | Dryburgh Athletic | |
| SWFL Cup | Glenrothes Strollers | 2–1 | McDermid Ladies | |

=== Individual honours ===
| Award | Winner | Team |
|---|---|---|
| Players' Player of the Year | Rachel Rowe | Rangers |
| Manager of the Year | Jo Potter | Rangers |
| Young Player of the Year | Mia McAulay | Rangers |

=== Scottish Women's Premier League ===
==== SWPL 1 ====
===== Regular season =====
| Pos | Team | Pld | W | D | L | GF | GA | GD | Pts | Qualification or relegation |
|---|---|---|---|---|---|---|---|---|---|---|
| 1 | Rangers | 22 | 19 | 3 | 0 | 92 | 10 | +82 | 60 | Qualification for the Top six |
| 2 | Celtic | 22 | 18 | 2 | 2 | 102 | 13 | +89 | 56 | Qualification for the Top six |
| 3 | Glasgow City | 22 | 18 | 2 | 2 | 72 | 13 | +59 | 56 | Qualification for the Top six |
| 4 | Hibernian | 22 | 12 | 3 | 7 | 60 | 32 | +28 | 39 | Qualification for the Top six |
| 5 | Heart of Midlothian | 22 | 13 | 3 | 6 | 58 | 22 | +36 | 42 | Qualification for the Top six |
| 6 | Partick Thistle | 22 | 12 | 2 | 8 | 35 | 35 | 0 | 38 | Qualification for the Top six |
| 7 | Aberdeen | 22 | 8 | 1 | 13 | 34 | 72 | −38 | 25 | Qualification for the Bottom six |
| 8 | Motherwell | 22 | 6 | 1 | 15 | 30 | 56 | −26 | 19 | Qualification for the Bottom six |
| 9 | Spartans | 22 | 3 | 4 | 15 | 26 | 57 | −31 | 13 | Qualification for the Bottom six |
| 10 | Montrose | 22 | 3 | 4 | 15 | 25 | 86 | −61 | 13 | Qualification for the Bottom six |
| 11 | Dundee United | 22 | 3 | 1 | 18 | 19 | 86 | −67 | 10 | Qualification for the Bottom six |
| 12 | Hamilton Academical | 22 | 2 | 4 | 16 | 17 | 88 | −71 | 10 | Qualification for the Bottom six |

Rules for classification: 1) Points; 2) Goal difference; 3) Number of goals scored

===== Top six =====
| Pos | Team | Pld | W | D | L | GF | GA | GD | Pts | Qualification or relegation |
|---|---|---|---|---|---|---|---|---|---|---|
| 1 | Celtic (C) | 32 | 26 | 4 | 2 | 126 | 18 | +108 | 82 | Qualification for the Champions League first round |
| 2 | Rangers | 32 | 26 | 4 | 2 | 113 | 18 | +95 | 82 | Qualification for the Champions League first round |
| 3 | Glasgow City | 32 | 23 | 4 | 5 | 89 | 25 | +64 | 73 | |
| 4 | Heart of Midlothian | 32 | 17 | 3 | 12 | 68 | 41 | +27 | 54 | |
| 5 | Hibernian | 32 | 14 | 4 | 14 | 71 | 47 | +24 | 46 | |
| 6 | Partick Thistle | 32 | 13 | 2 | 17 | 42 | 66 | −24 | 41 | |

Updated to match(es) played on 19 May 2024. Source:
Rules for classification: 1) Points; 2) Goal difference; 3) Number of goals scored
(C) Champions

===== Bottom six =====
| Pos | Team | Pld | W | D | L | GF | GA | GD | Pts | Qualification or relegation |
|---|---|---|---|---|---|---|---|---|---|---|
| 7 | Motherwell | 32 | 14 | 3 | 15 | 57 | 66 | −9 | 45 | |
| 8 | Aberdeen | 32 | 12 | 4 | 16 | 57 | 92 | −35 | 40 | |
| 9 | Montrose | 32 | 9 | 6 | 17 | 46 | 101 | −55 | 33 | |
| 10 | Spartans | 32 | 7 | 6 | 19 | 44 | 74 | −30 | 27 | |
| 11 | Dundee United | 32 | 4 | 3 | 25 | 28 | 109 | −81 | 15 | Qualification for the SWPL Play-off Final |
| 12 | Hamilton Academical (R) | 32 | 3 | 5 | 24 | 31 | 115 | −84 | 14 | Relegation to SWPL2 |

Updated to match(es) played on 19 May 2024. Source:
Rules for classification: 1) Points; 2) Goal difference; 3) Number of goals scored
(R) Relegated

=== UEFA Women's Champions League ===
==== Glasgow City ====
| 6 September 2023 Round 1 | Glasgow City (Scotland) | 2–0 | (Republic of Ireland) Shelbourne | Šiauliai |
| | Lovera 54'; Davidson 65' | Report | | Stadium: Siauliai central stadium Referee: Ifeoma Kulmala (Finland) |

| 9 September 2023 Round 1 | Glasgow City (Scotland) | 3–0 | (Lithuania) Gintra | Šiauliai |
| | Lovera 1'; Weir 29'; Davidson 67' | Report | | Stadium: Siauliai central stadium Attendance: 550; Referee: Andromachi Tsiofliki (Greece) |

| 11 October 2023 Round 2 | Glasgow City (Scotland) | 0–4 | (Norway) Brann | Glasgow |
| 19:35 BST | | Report | Engesvik 5', 39'; Eikeland 13'; Lund 86' | Stadium: Petershill Park; Attendance: 865; Referee: Ewa Augustyn (Poland) |

| 18 October 2023 Round 2 | Brann (Norway) | 2–0 (6–0 agg.) | (Scotland) Glasgow City | Bergen |
| 18:00 BST | Østenstad 34'; Lie 86' | Report | | Stadium: Brann Stadion; Referee: Marta Huerta de Aza (Spain) |

==== Celtic ====
| 6 September 2023 Round 1 | Brøndby (Denmark) | 0–1 | (Scotland) Celtic | Oslo |
| | | Report | Clark 69' | Stadium: Intility Arena; Referee: Gamze Durmuş (Turkey) |

| 9 September 2023 Round 1 | Vålerenga (Norway) | 2–2 (a.e.t.) (11–10 p) | (Scotland) Celtic | Oslo |
| | Tvedten 5'; Thorsnes 120+3' (pen.) | Report | Loferski 9'; Smith 116' | Stadium: Intility Arena; Referee: Olatz Rivera Olmedo (Spain) |
| | Penalties |
| | Thorsnes (penalty scored); Tvedten (penalty scored); Thomsen (penalty scored); Löfwenius (penalty scored); Sigurðardóttir (penalty scored); Kovacs (penalty scored); Vickius (penalty scored); Brekken (penalty scored); Pechersky (penalty scored); Pettersen (penalty scored); Rogic (penalty scored) | | (penalty scored) Clark; (penalty scored) McAneny; (penalty scored) Partido; (penalty scored) Craig; (penalty scored) Shen Mengyu; (penalty scored) Burchill; (penalty scored) Shen Menglu; (penalty scored) Agnew; (penalty scored) Hayes; (penalty scored) Goldie; (penalty missed) Daugherty |

=== Scotland women's national team ===
| 14 July 2023 Friendly | Scotland | 3–0 | Northern Ireland | Dundee |
| | Cuthbert 32'; Kerr 37'; Thomas 39' | Report | | Stadium: Dens Park; Referee: Lisa Benn (England) |

| 17 July 2023 Friendly | Finland | 1–2 | Scotland | Tampere |
| | Pikkujämsä 25' | Report | Weir 13'; Watson 19' | Stadium: Tampere Stadium |

| 22 September 2023 Nations League A | England | 2–1 | Scotland | Sunderland |
| | Bronze 39'; Hemp 45' | Report | Hanson 45+2' | Stadium: Stadium of Light; Attendance: 41,947; Referee: Maria Sole Ferrieri Caputi (Italy) |

| 26 September 2023 Nations League A | Scotland | 1–1 | Belgium | Glasgow |
| | Howard 90+4' | Report | Missipo 52' | Stadium: Hampden Park; Attendance: 7,058; Referee: Eleni Antoniou (Greece) |

| 27 October 2023 Nations League A | Netherlands | 4–0 | Scotland | Nijmegen |
| | van de Donk 12'; Brugts 32'; Beerensteyn 52', 71' | Report | | Stadium: Goffertstadion; Attendance: 10,850; Referee: Ivana Projkovska (North Macedonia) |

| 31 October 2023 Nations League A | Scotland | 0–1 | Netherlands | Glasgow |
| | | Report | Brugts 60' | Stadium: Hampden Park; Attendance: 5,186; Referee: Jana Adámková (Czech Republic) |

| 1 December 2023 Nations League A | Belgium | 1–1 | Scotland | Leuven |
| | Detruyer 30' | Report | Cuthbert 34' | Stadium: Den Dreef; Attendance: 4,730; Referee: Olatz Rivera Olmedo (Spain) |

| 5 December 2023 Nations League A | Scotland | 0–6 | England | Glasgow |
| | | Report | Greenwood 13'; James 38', 39'; Mead 45+1'; Kirby 49'; Bronze 90+3' | Stadium: Hampden Park; Attendance: 15,320; Referee: Alina Peşu (Romania) |

| 24 February 2024 2024 Pinatar Cup | Philippines | 0–2 | Scotland | San Pedro del Pinatar |
| | | Report | Thomas 23', 36' | Stadium: Pinatar Arena; Attendance: 200; Referee: Jana Adámková (Czech Republic) |

| 27 February 2024 2024 Pinatar Cup | Scotland | 1–1 (4–5 p) | Finland | San Pedro del Pinatar |
| | Thomas 75' | Report | Sevenius 21' | Stadium: Pinatar Arena; Attendance: 200; Referee: Jana Adámková (Czech Republic) |

| 5 April 2024 Euro 2025 qualifying | Serbia | 0–0 | Scotland | Leskovac |
| | | Report | | Stadium: Dubočica Stadium; Referee: Riem Hussein (Germany) |

| 9 April 2024 Euro 2025 qualifying | Scotland | 1–0 | Slovakia | Glasgow |
| | Howard 61' | Report | | Stadium: Hampden Park; Attendance: 3,127; Referee: Jelena Pejković (Croatia) |

| 31 May 2024 Euro 2025 qualifying | Scotland | 4–1 | Israel | Glasgow |
| | Emslie 17', 36'; Hanson 30'; Thomas 63' (pen.) | Report | Sommer 84' | Stadium: Hampden Park; Attendance: None; Referee: Deborah Bianchi (Italy) |

| 4 June 2024 Euro 2025 qualifying | Israel | 0–5 | Scotland | Budaörs (Hungary) |
| | | Report | Thomas 14', 37', 74', 77'; Cornet 86' | Stadium: Budaörsi Városi Stadium; Attendance: None; Referee: Jelena Kumer (Croatia) |

== Deaths ==
- July: Paul Watchman, 70, Clyde midfielder. (announced 18 July)
- 24 July: Trevor Francis, 69, Rangers forward.
- 30 July: Benny Rooney, 80, Celtic, Dumbarton, Dundee United, St Johnstone and Partick Thistle defender; Greenock Morton, Partick Thistle and Albion Rovers manager.
- 13 August: Joe Caven, 86, Airdrieonians, Raith Rovers, Greenock Morton and Stirling Albion forward.
- 23 August: Hugh Murney, 84, Morton, Dumbarton and Queen of the South wing-half.
- 17 September: Ronnie McKinnon, 83, Rangers and Scotland defender.
- 27 September: Jim Forrest, 79, Rangers, Aberdeen and Scotland forward.
- 1 October: Frank McDougall, 65, Clydebank, St Mirren and Aberdeen forward.
- 5 October: Bill Munro, 89, Kilmarnock and East Stirlingshire forward; Clydebank and Airdrie manager.
- 10 October: Willie Hinshelwood, 90, Greenock Morton and Hamilton Academical defender.
- 23 October: John Wilkie, 76, Brechin City, Arbroath, Raith Rovers and Greenock Morton winger.
- October: David Curlett, 91, Kilmarnock, Dundee and Ayr United centre forward and wing half. (announced 24 October)
- 13 November: Gordon Wallace, 74, Raith Rovers, Dundee United, Berwick Rangers and Cowdenbeath forward.
- November: Billy McPhee, 74, Rangers, East Fife and Berwick Rangers forward. (announced 18 November)
- 9 December: Willie McCulloch, 75, Alloa Athletic, Airdrieonians and Berwick Rangers midfielder; Cowdenbeath manager.
- 29 December: Ian Dair, 69, Cowdenbeath right-half.
- 15 January: Denis Connaghan, 79, St Mirren, Celtic, Greenock Morton and Clyde goalkeeper.
- 27 January: Stuart Gray, 50, Celtic and Greenock Morton full-back.
- 30 January: Ally Shewan, 83, Aberdeen left-back.
- 12 February: Tam Gourlay, 74, Airdrieonians, Partick Thistle and East Stirlingshire goalkeeper.
- February: Ian McMillan, 92, Airdrie, Rangers and Scotland inside forward; Airdrie manager.
- 23 February: Harry Melrose, 88, Dunfermline Athletic, Aberdeen and Berwick Rangers winger and inside forward, Berwick Rangers and Dunfermline Athletic manager.
- March: John Lough, 89, Heart of Midlothian and Arbroath defender. (announced 5 March)
- March: Raymond Edgar, 68, Hamilton Academical, Queen's Park, Clyde and East Stirlingshire midfielder and winger. (announced 8 March)
- 20 March: Jan Szpula, 101, Alloa Athletic and Stirling Albion winger.
- 29 March: Iain McChesney, 79, Queen of the South defender.
- 16 April: Dave Moyes, 68, Berwick Rangers, Meadowbank Thistle and Dunfermline Athletic defender.
- 3 May: Jim Rodger, 90, Rangers, St Mirren, Hearts, Queen of the South and East Fife winger.
- 20 May: Gerry Collins, 69, Stranraer, Albion Rovers, Ayr United, Hamilton Academical and Partick Thistle defender; Partick Thistle manager.
- 18 June: Billy Abercromby, 65, St Mirren, Partick Thistle, Dunfermline Athletic, Cowdenbeath and East Stirlingshire midfielder.
- 27 June: Landry Nguémo, 38, Celtic midfielder.
