= 2023–24 West of Scotland Football League =

West of Scotland Football League
- Season: 2023–24
- Dates: 29 July 2023 – 18 May 2024
- Champions: Beith Juniors

The 2023–24 West of Scotland Football League (known as the PDM Buildbase West of Scotland League for sponsorship reasons) was the fourth season of the West of Scotland Football League, with its top division as part of the sixth tier of the Scottish football pyramid system. Beith Juniors were the reigning champions, and successfully defended their title, winning the Premier Division by five points from Auchinleck Talbot.

== Teams ==
=== To West of Scotland Football League ===
Transferred from Saturday Morning Amateur Football League

- Knightswood

== Premier Division ==
West of Scotland Football League Premier Division
- Season: 2023–24
- Dates: 29 July 2023 – 15 May 2024
- Champions: Beith Juniors
- Relegated: Arthurlie; Irvine Meadow XI; Kirkintilloch Rob Roy
- Matches: 240
- Goals: 842 (3.51 per match)
- Biggest home win: Beith Juniors 9–0 Glenafton Athletic (27 April 2024)
- Biggest away win: Irvine Meadow XI 0–6 Hurlford United (11 May 2024)
- Highest scoring: Beith Juniors 9–0 Glenafton Athletic (27 April 2024); Auchinleck Talbot 6–3 Pollok (4 May 2024)
- Longest winning run: 6 matches: Auchinleck Talbot & Beith Juniors
- Longest unbeaten run: 11 matches: St Cadoc's
- Longest winless run: 12 matches: Irvine Meadow XI
- Longest losing run: 6 matches: Irvine Meadow XI & Kirkintilloch Rob Roy
- All statistics correct as of 15 May 2024.

Beith Juniors retained their West of Scotland Football League title, opening up an unassailable lead over Clydebank and Auchinleck Talbot, with a 2–0 home victory over Troon on 4 May 2024. However, just like the previous season, they were ineligible for promotion as they do not hold an SFA club licence.

Promoted from 2022–23 First Division:

- Gartcairn
- St Cadoc's
- Benburb

Relegated to 2023–24 First Division:

- Petershill
- Kilwinning Rangers
- Cambuslang Rangers

=== Stadia and locations ===
Club	Location	Ground	Surface	Capacity	Seats	Floodlit
Arthurlie	Barrhead	Dunterlie Park	Grass	3,000	0	No
Auchinleck Talbot ^{[SFA]}	Auchinleck	Beechwood Park	Grass	3,500	500	Yes
Beith Juniors	Beith	Bellsdale Park	Grass	1,809	0	No
Benburb ^{[SFA]}	Drumoyne, Glasgow	New Tinto Park	Artificial	1,000	500	Yes
Clydebank ^{[SFA]}	Clydebank	Holm Park	Artificial	1,200	0	Yes
Cumnock Juniors ^{[SFA]}	Cumnock	Townhead Park	Artificial	2,000	0	Yes
Darvel ^{[SFA]}	Darvel	Recreation Park	Grass	2,750	60	Yes
Gartcairn	Airdrie	MTC Park	Artificial	500	50	Yes
Glenafton Athletic ^{[SFA]}	New Cumnock	Loch Park	Grass	2,000	250	Yes
Hurlford United	Hurlford	Blair Park	Grass	1,500	0	No
Irvine Meadow XI ^{[SFA]}	Irvine	Meadow Park	Grass	2,132	700	Yes
Kirkintilloch Rob Roy	Cumbernauld	Guy's Meadow (Note: Kirkintilloch Rob Roy ground-shared with Cumbernauld United at Guy's Meadow.)	Grass	1,000	0	No
Largs Thistle	Largs	Barrfields Park	Artificial	3,000	800	No
Pollok ^{[SFA]}	Pollokshaws, Glasgow	Newlandsfield Park	Grass	2,088	0	Yes
St Cadoc's	Drumoyne, Glasgow	New Tinto Park (Note: St Cadoc's ground-shared with Benburb at New Tinto Park.)	Artificial	1,000	0	Yes
Troon	Troon	Portland Park	Grass	2,000	100	Yes

Notes

Location of teams in 2023–24 West of Scotland League Premier Division

=== League table ===
Pos	Team	Pld	W	D	L	GF	GA	GD	Pts	Promotion, qualification or relegation
1	Beith Juniors (C)	30	18	6	6	72	43	+29	60	Ineligible for the Lowland League play-off
2	Auchinleck Talbot	30	17	4	9	63	33	+30	55	
3	St Cadoc's	30	16	6	8	66	43	+23	54	
4	Clydebank	30	16	6	8	56	35	+21	54	
5	Largs Thistle	30	16	5	9	53	39	+14	53	
6	Pollok	30	14	8	8	73	56	+17	50	
7	Darvel	30	14	6	10	56	45	+11	48	
8	Cumnock Juniors	30	11	8	11	50	69	−19	41	
9	Hurlford United	30	12	4	14	51	45	+6	40	
10	Gartcairn	30	10	8	12	52	52	0	38	
11	Benburb	30	11	5	14	42	44	−2	38	
12	Troon	30	10	6	14	47	63	−16	36	
13	Glenafton Athletic	30	9	6	15	46	67	−21	33	
14	Arthurlie (R)	30	8	8	14	58	59	−1	32	Relegation to the First Division
15	Kirkintilloch Rob Roy (R)	30	7	6	17	32	61	−29	27	Relegation to the First Division
16	Irvine Meadow XI (R)	30	3	4	23	25	88	−63	13	Relegation to the First Division

Source: West of Scotland Football League
Rules for classification: 1) Points; 2) Goal difference; 3) Goals scored
(C) Champions; (R) Relegated

=== Results ===
Home \ Away	ART	AUC	BEI	BNB	CLY	CMN	DAR	GAR	GLE	HUR	IVM	KRR	LRG	PLK	STC	TRO
Arthurlie		2–2	5–0	2–1	0–1	4–3	0–3	1–1	1–2	2–1	7–0	1–2	1–2	2–2	3–0	1–2
Auchinleck Talbot	2–2		1–1	3–0	0–1	4–0	1–2	4–0	5–2	2–0	2–0	1–0	1–0	6–3	1–2	3–2
Beith Juniors	4–2	1–0		2–0	2–1	1–3	3–2	4–4	9–0	1–1	4–0	1–0	4–1	1–1	1–3	2–0
Benburb	1–1	0–1	1–4		2–0	1–2	0–3	0–1	1–1	3–0	4–1	3–1	0–0	4–1	0–2	2–1
Clydebank	3–2	2–1	3–0	2–3		5–2	2–2	0–1	4–1	1–1	3–1	2–0	2–3	1–0	2–1	5–1
Cumnock Juniors	3–2	1–3	2–4	2–1	1–1		0–5	3–2	1–2	3–2	1–0	1–1	1–1	2–2	0–2	4–3
Darvel	2–2	0–5	2–1	3–2	1–0	2–2		2–1	1–2	0–0	4–3	4–0	0–1	2–4	2–0	1–2
Gartcairn	4–1	0–2	1–2	3–3	2–2	0–1	2–0		4–3	2–1	1–0	0–1	1–1	2–4	0–1	3–3
Glenafton Athletic	1–1	2–1	0–0	0–1	2–3	5–0	0–1	0–1		1–1	1–2	2–1	2–3	2–5	1–3	1–3
Hurlford United	1–2	3–2	1–2	0–1	0–1	5–2	2–0	1–0	3–4		2–1	5–2	0–1	1–3	2–1	3–1
Irvine Meadow XI	3–2	1–4	0–5	1–3	1–1	1–1	1–4	1–4	2–4	0–6		1–1	0–1	2–1	0–3	0–2
Kirkintilloch Rob Roy	3–2	0–2 (Note: Match played at Duncansfield Park, Kilsyth.)	0–3	2–1 (Note: Match played at Duncansfield Park, Kilsyth.)	0–3	1–4	3–1	0–4	1–1	0–2	2–2		0–3	1–2	2–0	2–1
Largs Thistle	2–0	2–0	0–1	1–0	0–2	5–0	1–3	4–2	2–2	3–1	1–0	1–0		1–3	1–1	3–4
Pollok	3–1	1–0	3–4	1–1	2–1	2–2	1–1	3–2	1–2	3–1	6–0	3–3	4–2		2–3	2–2
St Cadoc's	4–4	3–4	3–3	3–1	2–2	0–1	1–1	2–2	4–0	1–3	6–0	3–1	3–2	3–2		1–0
Troon	1–2	0–0	3–2	0–2	1–0	2–2	3–2	2–2	2–0	0–2	2–1	2–2	1–5	1–3	0–5	

Source: wosfl.co.uk
Legend: Blue = home team win; Yellow = draw; Red = away team win.

== First Division ==
West of Scotland Football League First Division
- Season: 2023–24
- Dates: 29 July 2023 – 18 May 2024
- Champions: Drumchapel United
- Promoted: Drumchapel United; Johnstone Burgh; Shotts Bon Accord
- Relegated: Cambuslang Rangers; Neilston; Whitletts Victoria
- Matches: 240
- Goals: 860 (3.58 per match)
- Biggest home win: Drumchapel United 6–0 Shotts Bon Accord (28 October 2023)
- Biggest away win: Cambuslang Rangers 0–7 Ashfield (16 August 2023)
- Highest scoring: Ashfield 6–3 Neilston (17 February 2024)
- Longest winning run: 6 matches: Johnstone Burgh & Kilwinning Rangers
- Longest unbeaten run: 12 matches: Drumchapel United
- Longest winless run: 16 matches: Whitletts Victoria
- Longest losing run: 8 matches: Whitletts Victoria
- All statistics correct as of 18 May 2024.

Drumchapel United won the league title on 7 May 2024, with their 4–0 win at Thorniewood United taking them out of reach of both Johnstone Burgh (7 points behind with 2 games remaining) and Shotts Bon Accord (10 points behind with 3 games remaining).

Promoted from 2022–23 Second Division:

- Renfrew
- Ashfield
- Maybole Juniors

Relegated from 2022–23 Premier Division:

- Petershill
- Kilwinning Rangers
- Cambuslang Rangers

Relegated to 2023–24 Second Division:

- Bonnyton Thistle
- Cumbernauld United
- Rossvale (now Caledonian Locomotives)

Promoted to 2023–24 Premier Division:

- Gartcairn
- St Cadoc's
- Benburb

=== Stadia and locations ===
Team	Location	Ground	Surface	Capacity	Seats	Floodlit
Ashfield	Easterhouse, Glasgow	Stepford Football Centre (Note: Ashfield ground-shared with Easterhouse Academy at Stepford Football Centre.)	Artificial	500	0	Yes
Blantyre Victoria	Blantyre	Castle Park	Grass	1,500	60	No
Cambuslang Rangers	Cambuslang	Somervell Park	Grass	2,000	0	No
Drumchapel United	Drumchapel, Glasgow	Donald Dewar Centre 4G	Artificial	500	0	Yes
Johnstone Burgh	Johnstone	Keanie Park	Grass	2,000	0	No
Kilbirnie Ladeside	Kilbirnie	Valefield Park	Grass	1,000	22	No
Kilwinning Rangers ^{[SFA]}	Kilwinning	Buffs Park	Grass	2,800	270	Yes
Maybole Juniors	Maybole	Ladywell Stadium	Grass	1,000	124	No
Neilston	Neilston	Brig-o-Lea Stadium	Grass	1,000	0	No
Petershill	Springburn, Glasgow	Petershill Park	Artificial	1,500	500	Yes
Renfrew	Renfrew	New Western Park	Artificial	1,000	0	Yes
Rutherglen Glencairn ^{[SFA]}	Rutherglen	New Southcroft Park	Grass	1,683	0	Yes
Shotts Bon Accord	Shotts	Hannah Park	Grass	2,000	0	No
St Roch's	Provanmill, Glasgow	James McGrory Park	Grass	1,500	0	No
Thorniewood United	Viewpark	Robertson Park	Grass	1,000	0	No
Whitletts Victoria	Ayr	Dam Park Stadium	Grass	3,000	478	Yes

Notes

Location of teams in 2023–24 West of Scotland League First Division
Location of teams in 2023–24 West of Scotland League First Division in the Greater Glasgow area

=== League table ===
Pos	Team	Pld	W	D	L	GF	GA	GD	Pts	Promotion or relegation
1	Drumchapel United (C, P)	30	19	5	6	79	34	+45	62	Promotion to the Premier Division
2	Shotts Bon Accord (P)	30	18	5	7	54	42	+12	59	Promotion to the Premier Division
3	Johnstone Burgh (P)	30	18	4	8	73	46	+27	58	Promotion to the Premier Division
4	Rutherglen Glencairn	30	16	5	9	48	40	+8	53	
5	Ashfield	30	16	3	11	76	54	+22	51	
6	Petershill	30	14	5	11	59	58	+1	47	
7	Kilwinning Rangers	30	14	4	12	57	52	+5	46	
8	Blantyre Victoria	30	13	5	12	37	42	−5	44	
9	Thorniewood United	30	11	9	10	50	48	+2	42	
10	St Roch's	30	12	6	12	43	44	−1	42	
11	Kilbirnie Ladeside	30	11	6	13	64	58	+6	39	
12	Renfrew	30	9	6	15	45	50	−5	33	
13	Maybole Juniors	30	9	4	17	46	71	−25	31	
14	Cambuslang Rangers (R)	30	6	9	15	45	77	−32	27	Relegation to the Second Division
15	Whitletts Victoria (R)	30	5	8	17	47	80	−33	23	Relegation to the Second Division
16	Neilston (R)	30	5	4	21	37	64	−27	19	Relegation to the Second Division

Source: West of Scotland Football League
Rules for classification: 1) Points; 2) Goal difference; 3) Goals scored
(C) Champions; (P) Promoted; (R) Relegated

=== Results ===
Home \ Away	ASH	BLV	CAM	DRU	JOB	KLB	KWN	MAY	NEI	PET	REN	RUG	SBA	STR	THU	WHV
Ashfield		1–2	1–1	1–5	3–3	5–2	3–0	4–1	6–3	4–3	3–2	0–1	2–3	0–1	2–3	4–4
Blantyre Victoria	3–0		2–1	1–1	1–2	2–1	0–4	2–1	0–2	3–3	1–0	2–0	2–3	0–2	2–1	1–0
Cambuslang Rangers	0–7	0–1		0–3	2–5	1–4	2–2	3–2	2–1	3–3	2–2	0–3	4–4	4–1	2–1	1–1
Drumchapel United	2–0	3–0	2–0		3–1	6–1	3–2	0–1	4–1	3–4	1–1	2–2	6–0	4–0	1–3	3–3
Johnstone Burgh	3–2 (Note: Match played at New Western Park, Renfrew.)	1–0	6–1 (Note: Match played at K-Park Training Academy, East Kilbride.)	2–1		2–1	2–3	1–4	2–0	4–0	3–0	1–1	2–3	2–1 (Note: Match played at New Western Park, Renfrew.)	2–2 (Note: Match played at K-Park Training Academy, East Kilbride.)	5–1
Kilbirnie Ladeside	2–3	3–3	2–2	2–3	2–0		1–2	4–1	4–0	1–3	3–0	0–1	0–2	0–1	1–1	5–2
Kilwinning Rangers	1–2	3–1	3–2	3–1	2–3	1–2		0–1	1–5	3–0	1–1	1–2	1–1	4–3	1–2	3–4
Maybole Juniors	0–3	1–1	1–4	0–4	2–4	3–3	2–4		1–0	0–4	2–2	2–2	2–3	2–0	3–2	4–1
Neilston	1–2	0–1	2–2	1–2	2–4	2–3	0–2	0–1		1–2	3–2	0–3	1–2	1–0	2–5	2–2
Petershill	1–4	1–0	1–0	3–1	3–2	5–1	2–3	3–1	0–2		2–1	1–2	0–2	4–1	2–2	3–3
Renfrew	3–1	0–1	5–0	0–3	0–4	2–4	2–1	3–2	0–0	0–1		4–2	4–1	0–2	3–0	3–0
Rutherglen Glencairn	1–4	1–2	2–1	1–1	2–1	0–5	0–0	1–0	4–2	5–1	2–0		0–1	2–0	1–0	3–1
Shotts Bon Accord	0–1	0–0	5–0	0–3	0–1	2–1	1–2	5–1	1–0	2–0	1–0	0–3		2–0	0–0	1–0
St Roch's	0–3	3–1	3–2	1–3	2–1	0–0	2–0	4–1	1–1	1–1	3–0	3–0	1–2		1–1	1–1
Thorniewood United	2–1	2–1	0–0	0–4	0–2	1–4 (Note: Match played at New Douglas Park, Hamilton.)	1–2	1–0	2–1	1–2	1–1	3–0	3–3	2–2		5–2
Whitletts Victoria	1–4	2–1 (Note: Match played at New Voluntary Park.)	2–3 (Note: Match played at New Voluntary Park.)	0–1 (Note: Match played at New Voluntary Park.)	2–2	2–2 (Note: Match played at New Voluntary Park.)	1–2	3–4 (Note: Match played at New Voluntary Park.)	3–1 (Note: Match played at New Voluntary Park.)	2–1 (Note: Match played at New Voluntary Park.)	0–4 (Note: Match played at New Voluntary Park.)	2–1 (Note: Match played at New Voluntary Park.)	2–4 (Note: Match played at New Voluntary Park.)	0–3	0–3 (Note: Match played at New Voluntary Park.)	

Source: wosfl.co.uk
Legend: Blue = home team win; Yellow = draw; Red = away team win.

== Second Division ==
West of Scotland Football League Second Division
- Season: 2023–24
- Dates: 29 July 2023 – 18 May 2024
- Champions: Ardrossan Winton Rovers
- Promoted: Ardrossan Winton Rovers; Cumbernauld United; Vale of Clyde
- Relegated: Glasgow Perthshire; Glasgow University; Wishaw
- Matches: 240
- Goals: 898 (3.74 per match)
- Biggest home win: Ardrossan Winton Rovers 10–0 Glasgow Perthshire (5 August 2023)
- Biggest away win: Wishaw 0–6 Glasgow Perthshire (26 August 2023); Forth Wanderers 0–6 Vale of Clyde (8 May 2024)
- Highest scoring: Ardrossan Winton Rovers 10–0 Glasgow Perthshire (5 August 2023); Glasgow Perthshire 3–7 Ardrossan Winton Rovers (16 December 2023)
- Longest winning run: 10 matches: Ardrossan Winton Rovers
- Longest unbeaten run: 10 matches: Ardrossan Winton Rovers
- Longest winless run: 17 matches: Glasgow University
- Longest losing run: 6 matches: Craigmark Burntonians
- All statistics correct as of 18 May 2024.

Ardrossan Winton Rovers won the title on 4 May 2024 with a 5–4 home victory over Caledonian Locomotives – who had changed their name from Rossvale prior to the start of the season – to put the title out of reach of Cumbernauld United.

Promoted from 2022–23 Third Division:

- Vale of Clyde
- Larkhall Thistle
- Ardrossan Winton Rovers

Relegated from 2022–23 First Division:

- Bonnyton Thistle
- Cumbernauld United
- Caledonian Locomotives

Relegated to 2023–24 Third Division:

- Ardeer Thistle
- Greenock Juniors
- Glasgow United

Promoted to 2023–24 First Division:

- Renfrew
- Ashfield
- Maybole Juniors

=== Stadia and locations ===
Team	Location	Ground	Surface	Capacity	Seats	Floodlit
Ardrossan Winton Rovers	Ardrossan	Winton Park	Grass	2,000	80	Yes
Bonnyton Thistle ^{[SFA]}	Kilmarnock	Bonnyton Park	Artificial	500	0	Yes
Caledonian Locomotives	Springburn, Glasgow	Petershill Park (Note: Caledonian Locomotives ground-shared with Petershill at Petershill Park.)	Artificial	1,500	500	Yes
Craigmark Burntonians	Dalmellington	Station Park	Grass	1,500	0	No
Cumbernauld United	Cumbernauld Village	Guy's Meadow	Grass	1,000	0	No
Forth Wanderers	Forth	Kingshill Park	Grass	1,000	0	No
Glasgow Perthshire	Possilpark, Glasgow	Keppoch Park	Grass	1,500	90	No
Glasgow University ^{[SFA]}	Airdrie	Excelsior Stadium (Note: Glasgow University ground-shared with Airdrieonians at the Excelsior Stadium.)	Artificial	10,101	10,101	Yes
Kilsyth Rangers	Kilsyth	Duncansfield	Grass	1,500	0	No
Larkhall Thistle	Larkhall	Gasworks Park	Grass	1,500	0	No
Maryhill	Maryhill, Glasgow	Lochburn Park	Grass	1,800	205	Yes
Muirkirk Juniors	Muirkirk	Burnside Park	Grass	1,600	0	No
St Anthony's	Shieldhall, Glasgow	McKenna Park	Grass	1,000	0	No
Vale of Clyde	Tollcross, Glasgow	Fullarton Park	Grass	1,500	0	No
Wishaw	Wishaw	Beltane Park	Grass	1,000	0	No
Yoker Athletic	Clydebank	Holm Park	Artificial	1,200	0	Yes

Notes

Location of teams in 2023–24 West of Scotland League Second Division
Location of teams in 2023–24 West of Scotland League Second Division in the Greater Glasgow area

=== League table ===
Pos	Team	Pld	W	D	L	GF	GA	GD	Pts	Promotion or relegation
1	Ardrossan Winton Rovers (C, P)	30	25	0	5	96	40	+56	75	Promotion to the First Division
2	Vale of Clyde (P)	30	21	2	7	78	38	+40	65	Promotion to the First Division
3	Cumbernauld United (P)	30	19	3	8	65	43	+22	60	Promotion to the First Division
4	Caledonian Locomotives	30	16	5	9	70	46	+24	53	
5	Kilsyth Rangers	30	15	4	11	53	48	+5	49	
6	Larkhall Thistle	30	13	5	12	56	49	+7	44	
7	Maryhill	30	12	8	10	58	54	+4	44	
8	Forth Wanderers	30	13	4	13	46	60	−14	43	
9	Muirkirk Juniors	30	11	4	15	56	64	−8	37	
10	Yoker Athletic	30	9	8	13	39	49	−10	35	
11	St Anthony's (Note: St Anthony's deducted 3 points for fielding an ineligible player.)	30	10	7	13	47	46	+1	34	
12	Bonnyton Thistle	30	8	9	13	51	64	−13	33	
13	Craigmark Burntonians	30	9	6	15	44	65	−21	33	
14	Glasgow Perthshire (R)	30	7	7	16	59	81	−22	28	Relegation to the Third Division
15	Wishaw (R)	30	7	4	19	42	79	−37	25	Relegation to the Third Division
16	Glasgow University (R)	30	5	4	21	38	72	−34	19	Relegation to the Third Division

Source: West of Scotland Football League
Rules for classification: 1) Points; 2) Goal difference; 3) Goals scored
(C) Champions; (P) Promoted; (R) Relegated

=== Results ===
Home \ Away	AWR	BON	CAL	CMU	CRB	FOR	GLP	GLU	KRA	LAR	MAR	MUI	STA	VOC	WSH	YOK
Ardrossan Winton Rovers		3–2	5–4	2–3	3–2	3–0	10–0	6–1	3–1	2–1	4–2	4–2	4–1	3–4	3–0	4–0
Bonnyton Thistle	0–3		2–2	3–2	4–3	1–1	2–4	2–1	1–4	0–4	2–4	0–2	3–4	1–2	3–0	0–0
Caledonian Locomotives	1–2	3–2		6–0	4–0	3–1	1–1	3–1	3–0	3–0	1–2	2–2	1–0	1–0	7–2	1–1
Cumbernauld United	2–1	0–2	3–2		2–3	2–3	2–1	4–2	4–0	5–2	0–2	4–1	1–1	4–0	3–0	1–1
Craigmark Burntonians	0–3	1–1	1–2	0–2		2–2	5–2	1–3	1–0	1–3	2–2	3–2	0–2	1–1	0–0	2–3
Forth Wanderers	3–2	3–4 (Note: Match played at John Cumming Stadium, Carluke.)	1–2	1–2	3–2		2–1	1–1	2–1	0–2	1–2	2–1	2–1	0–6	4–3	3–1
Glasgow Perthshire	3–7	3–0	3–5	1–4	0–0	4–1		2–3	3–1	2–3	4–4	2–3	0–3	4–2	1–2	1–4
Glasgow University	2–3	1–2	1–4	0–4	1–2	0–1	2–2		0–2	1–4	2–2	0–3 (Note: Match played at McKenna Park, Shieldhall.)	2–2	0–2	3–0	1–2
Kilsyth Rangers	0–1	1–1	0–2	3–0	0–2	0–0	1–1	3–1		3–1	1–1	3–0	2–1	4–3	3–2	4–0
Larkhall Thistle	0–3	3–1	2–2	1–2	3–1	2–0	2–0	2–3	4–1		2–3	2–2	0–0	0–1	2–2	1–1
Maryhill	0–3	3–3	2–1	0–2	1–2	1–2	4–2	3–2	4–1	4–0		0–2	0–2	2–1	3–1	2–2
Muirkirk Juniors	1–2	2–2	0–2	0–1	3–0	0–2	2–2	3–0	3–5	2–6	1–0		3–1	3–4	5–2	1–0
St Anthony's	1–2	1–1	5–1	0–1	0–2	2–1	2–2	2–1	1–2	0–2	1–0	4–1		1–3	5–3	1–2
Vale of Clyde	2–3	1–0	3–0	2–2	7–0	5–0	3–0	3–1	1–2	2–1	3–1	6–2	2–1		3–0	2–0
Wishaw	2–1	2–5	2–0	3–2	2–3	1–2	0–6	1–2	0–2	2–0	2–2	0–3	2–2	0–2		4–1
Yoker Athletic	0–1	1–1	2–1	0–1	4–2	3–2	1–2	1–0	2–3	0–1	2–2	3–1	0–0	1–2	1–2	

Source: wosfl.co.uk
Legend: Blue = home team win; Yellow = draw; Red = away team win.

== Third Division ==
West of Scotland Football League Third Division
- Season: 2023–24
- Dates: 29 July 2023 – 18 May 2024
- Champions: Lanark United
- Promoted: Bellshill Athletic; Lanark United; Lesmahagow
- Relegated: Kello Rovers; Port Glasgow; West Park United
- Matches: 240
- Goals: 944 (3.93 per match)
- Biggest home win: Lanark United 8–0 Greenock Juniors (11 May 2024)
- Biggest away win: Greenock Juniors 0–6 Irvine Victoria (18 November 2023)
- Highest scoring: Lesmahagow 7–6 Vale of Leven (29 July 2023)
- Longest winning run: 12 matches: Lanark United
- Longest unbeaten run: 14 matches: Lanark United & Lesmahagow
- Longest winless run: 17 matches: West Park United
- Longest losing run: 9 matches: Kello Rovers
- All statistics correct as of 18 May 2024.

Lanark United won the league title on 11 May 2024, with an 8–0 victory over Greenock Juniors giving them an unassailable lead over Lesmahagow, following a run of 18 wins in 19 games.

Relegated from 2022–23 Second Division:

- Ardeer Thistle
- Greenock Juniors
- Glasgow United

Promoted from 2022–23 Fourth Division:

- West Park United
- Kilsyth Athletic
- Threave Rovers

Relegated to 2023–24 Fourth Division:

- Lugar Boswell Thistle
- East Kilbride Thistle
- Carluke Rovers
- Newmains United
- Royal Albert
- Saltcoats Victoria

Promoted to 2023–24 Second Division:

- Vale of Clyde
- Larkhall Thistle
- Ardrossan Winton Rovers

=== Stadia and locations ===
Team	Location	Ground	Surface	Capacity	Seats	Floodlit
Ardeer Thistle	Stevenston	Ardeer Stadium	Grass	1,500	0	No
Bellshill Athletic	Bellshill	Rockburn Park	Grass	500	0	No
Dalry Thistle	Dalry	Merksworth Park	Grass	1,500	0	No
Finnart	Springburn, Glasgow	Springburn Park	Artificial	500	0	Yes
Girvan ^{[SFA]}	Girvan	Hamilton Park	Grass	2,000	200	Yes
Glasgow United	Shettleston, Glasgow	Greenfield Park	Grass	1,800	10	No
Greenock Juniors	Greenock	Ravenscraig Stadium	Grass	6,000	650	Yes
Irvine Victoria	Irvine	Victoria Park	Grass	1,000	0	No
Kello Rovers	Kirkconnel	Nithside Park	Grass	1,700	0	No
Kilsyth Athletic	Kilsyth	Kilsyth Sports Field	Artificial	300	0	Yes
Lanark United	Lanark	Moor Park	Grass	1,500	0	No
Lesmahagow	Lesmahagow	Craighead Park	Grass	2,000	0	No
Port Glasgow	Port Glasgow	Port Glasgow Community Stadium	Artificial	1,500	0	Yes
Threave Rovers ^{[SFA]}	Castle Douglas	Meadow Park	Grass	1,500	100	Yes
Vale of Leven	Alexandria	Millburn Park	Grass	2,000	0	No
West Park United	Bishopbriggs	Huntershill	Artificial	500	0	Yes

Location of teams in 2023–24 West of Scotland League Third Division

=== League table ===
Pos	Team	Pld	W	D	L	GF	GA	GD	Pts	Promotion or relegation
1	Lanark United (C, P)	30	21	4	5	76	35	+41	67	Promotion to the Second Division
2	Lesmahagow (P)	30	17	5	8	77	64	+13	56	Promotion to the Second Division
3	Bellshill Athletic (P)	30	16	6	8	64	47	+17	54	Promotion to the Second Division
4	Threave Rovers	30	15	7	8	64	44	+20	52	
5	Finnart	30	14	7	9	58	49	+9	49	
6	Vale of Leven	30	14	5	11	56	64	−8	47	
7	Irvine Victoria	30	13	6	11	68	54	+14	45	
8	Greenock Juniors	30	13	6	11	58	63	−5	45	
9	Glasgow United (Note: Glasgow United deducted 3 points for fielding an ineligible player.)	30	14	2	14	69	62	+7	41	
10	Dalry Thistle	30	11	5	14	55	60	−5	38	
11	Ardeer Thistle	30	9	9	12	52	63	−11	36	
12	Kilsyth Athletic	30	10	4	16	52	57	−5	34	
13	Girvan	30	9	7	14	50	55	−5	34	
14	Port Glasgow (Note: Port Glasgow deducted 3 points for fielding an ineligible player.) (R)	30	11	3	16	52	60	−8	33	Relegation to the Fourth Division
15	Kello Rovers (R)	30	5	6	19	39	81	−42	21	Relegation to the Fourth Division
16	West Park United (R)	30	4	6	20	54	86	−32	18	Relegation to the Fourth Division

Source: West of Scotland Football League
Rules for classification: 1) Points; 2) Goal difference; 3) Goals scored
(C) Champions; (P) Promoted; (R) Relegated

=== Results ===
Home \ Away	ARD	BEL	DAL	FIN	GIR	GLA	GRE	IRV	KEL	KIL	LAN	LES	PGL	THR	VOL	WPU
Ardeer Thistle		1–1	2–1	0–3	2–2	4–5	1–2	0–4	1–0	1–0	1–4	5–1	2–2	1–2	1–2	2–4
Bellshill Athletic	2–1		2–1	3–1	2–1	5–0	0–1	5–4	4–1	2–0	0–1	5–5	3–0	2–2	2–1	3–3
Dalry Thistle	3–6	1–1		1–1	4–1	3–1 (Note: Match played at Kilwinning Sports Club, Kilwinning.)	1–0	2–2 (Note: Match played at Kilwinning Sports Club, Kilwinning.)	2–4	4–1	2–3	4–4	2–4	0–2	3–1	3–2 (Note: Match played at Kilwinning Sports Club, Kilwinning.)
Finnart	2–2	1–2	2–0		2–1	1–0	0–1	3–2	1–0	2–2 (Note: Match played at Greenfield Park, Shettleston.)	2–4	2–4	4–1	4–3	2–3	2–2
Girvan	0–0	4–3	0–2	1–3		1–2	2–2	4–0	0–1	3–2	1–2	2–1	4–1	1–4	2–4	4–3
Glasgow United	5–0	1–2	5–1	1–2	1–5		3–2	4–1	3–2	1–3	4–0	2–3	3–1	3–2	4–1	6–0
Greenock Juniors	0–2	1–4	4–1	4–3	2–0	2–2		0–6	1–1	3–4	2–4	3–1	2–0	1–1 (Note: Match played at Barrfields Stadium, Largs.)	1–1	3–3
Irvine Victoria	5–0	4–1	3–2	1–1	1–1	5–0	1–3		1–0	2–3	1–3	1–2	0–2	1–1	2–2	3–1
Kello Rovers	1–1	3–3	0–2	3–1	2–2	2–1	1–3	1–4		2–1	2–4	1–3	1–3	1–4	3–5	0–3
Kilsyth Athletic	1–2	3–0	2–0	1–2	2–1	4–2	4–5	1–1	2–2		1–2	5–4	0–3	1–2	0–1	1–1
Lanark United	3–3	0–3	2–0	1–1	1–1	2–0	8–0	5–1	2–0	1–0		1–2	2–0	2–2	5–0	3–1
Lesmahagow	1–4	1–0	1–1	1–3	2–1	3–2	3–2	2–3	6–1	2–0	0–1		3–3	3–1	7–6	4–3
Port Glasgow	3–0	1–0	1–2	1–1	0–2	1–2	0–3	1–2	7–1	4–3	1–3	0–2		0–3	1–2	5–3
Threave Rovers	2–2	0–1	1–2	1–2	1–1	1–0	2–1 (Note: Match played at North West Community Campus, Dumfries.)	2–4	5–2	1–0	3–2	1–1	1–2 (Note: Match played at North West Community Campus, Dumfries.)		4–0	2–0
Vale of Leven	1–4	2–0	2–1	3–1	1–2	2–2	2–1	2–1	1–1	0–3	1–0	0–3	1–0	1–4		5–1
West Park United	1–1	2–3	0–4	0–3	2–0	1–4	2–3	0–2	5–0	1–2	0–5	1–2	3–4	3–4	3–3	

Source: wosfl.co.uk
Legend: Blue = home team win; Yellow = draw; Red = away team win.

== Fourth Division ==
West of Scotland Football League Fourth Division
- Season: 2023–24
- Dates: 29 July 2023 – 18 May 2024
- Champions: Glenvale
- Promoted: Glenvale; Lugar Boswell Thistle; Thorn Athletic
- Matches: 240
- Goals: 1,150 (4.79 per match)
- Biggest home win: Giffnock SC 10–0 Royal Albert (19 August 2023)
- Biggest away win: Saltcoats Victoria 1–10 East Kilbride Thistle (4 November 2023)
- Highest scoring: Easterhouse 3–8 Glenvale (26 August 2023); Saltcoats Victoria 1–10 East Kilbride Thistle (4 November 2023)
- Longest winning run: 11 matches: Glenvale
- Longest unbeaten run: 11 matches: Glenvale & Lugar Boswell Thistle
- Longest winless run: 15 matches: St. Peter's
- Longest losing run: 10 matches: Campbeltown Pupils
- All statistics correct as of 18 May 2024.

Glenvale won the league title with a weekend to spare on 4 May 2024, with a 5–0 home victory over St. Peter's, to open an unassailable lead on Thorn Athletic.

Harmony Row F.C. became Giffnock Soccer Centre prior to the start of the season.

Relegated from 2022–23 Third Division:

- Lugar Boswell Thistle
- East Kilbride Thistle
- Carluke Rovers
- Newmains United
- Royal Albert
- Saltcoats Victoria

Transferred from Saturday Morning Amateur Football League

- Knightswood

Promoted to 2023–24 Third Division:

- West Park United
- Kilsyth Athletic
- Threave Rovers

=== Stadia and locations ===
Team	Location	Ground	Surface	Capacity	Seats	Floodlit
BSC Glasgow	Yoker, Glasgow	Peterson Park	Grass	500	0	No
Campbeltown Pupils	Campbeltown	Kintyre Park	Grass	1,500	0	No
Carluke Rovers ^{[SFA]}	Carluke	John Cumming Stadium	Artificial	1,500	0	Yes
East Kilbride Thistle	East Kilbride	The Showpark	Grass	1,500	0	No
Easterhouse Academy	Easterhouse, Glasgow	Stepford Park	Artificial	500	0	Yes
Eglinton	Kilwinning	Kilwinning Community Sports Club	Artificial	1,000	0	Yes
Giffnock SC	Giffnock	Eastwood Park	Artificial	500	0	Yes
Glenvale	Paisley	Ferguslie Sports Centre	Artificial	500	0	Yes
Knightswood	Knightswood, Glasgow	Scotstoun Sports Campus	Artificial	500	0	Yes
Lugar Boswell Thistle	Lugar	Rosebank Park	Grass	1,500	0	No
Newmains United	Newmains	Victoria Park	Grass	1,000	0	No
Rossvale	Bishopbriggs	Huntershill	Artificial	500	0	Yes
Saltcoats Victoria	Saltcoats	Campbell Park	Grass	1,500	0	No
Royal Albert	Stonehouse	Tileworks Park	Grass	1,000	0	No
St. Peter's	Renfrew	New Western Park (Note: St. Peter's ground-shared with Renfrew at New Western Park.)	Artificial	1,000	0	Yes
Thorn Athletic	Johnstone	Thorn Athletic Sports Academy	Grass	500	0	No

Notes

Location of teams in 2023–24 West of Scotland League Fourth Division
Location of teams in 2023–24 West of Scotland League Fourth Division in the Glasgow area
Location of teams in 2023–24 West of Scotland League Fourth Division in the Argyll and Bute area

=== League table ===
Pos	Team	Pld	W	D	L	GF	GA	GD	Pts	Promotion or qualification
1	Glenvale (C, P)	30	24	2	4	118	43	+75	74	Promotion to the Third Division
2	Thorn Athletic (P)	30	22	4	4	112	31	+81	70	Promotion to the Third Division
3	Lugar Boswell Thistle (P)	30	20	4	6	87	48	+39	64	Promotion to the Third Division
4	Rossvale	30	19	3	8	82	51	+31	60	
5	Giffnock SC	30	19	2	9	98	51	+47	59	
6	Eglinton	30	13	4	13	60	64	−4	43	
7	East Kilbride Thistle	30	11	8	11	91	79	+12	41	
8	BSC Glasgow	30	12	5	13	70	82	−12	41	
9	St. Peter's	30	11	5	14	62	60	+2	38	
10	Knightswood	30	11	4	15	58	77	−19	37	
11	Easterhouse Academy	30	11	1	18	61	83	−22	34	
12	Newmains United	30	7	7	16	57	83	−26	28	
13	Carluke Rovers	30	7	6	17	48	83	−35	27	
14	Royal Albert (Note: Royal Albert deducted 3 points for fielding an ineligible player.)	30	9	3	18	48	92	−44	27	
15	Campbeltown Pupils (Note: Campbeltown Pupils deducted 3 points for fielding an ineligible player.)	30	8	4	18	52	107	−55	25	
16	Saltcoats Victoria	30	4	2	24	46	116	−70	14	

Source: West of Scotland Football League
Rules for classification: 1) Points; 2) Goal difference; 3) Goals scored
(C) Champions; (P) Promoted

=== Results ===
Home \ Away	BSC	CAM	CAR	EAS	EKT	EGL	GSC	GLE	KNI	LBT	NUC	ROS	ROA	SAL	STP	THO
BSC Glasgow		1–2	2–0	2–3	4–4	3–2	3–1	1–7	3–0	4–4	1–1	3–1	0–3	3–0 (Note: Match awarded to BSC Glasgow, as Saltcoats Victoria were unable to fulfil the fixture.)	8–2	0–8
Campbeltown Pupils	3–3		1–2	2–0	2–6	1–5	0–5	1–8	3–2	3–5	2–2	3–2	4–2	3–3	3–0 (Note: Match awarded to Campbeltown Pupils, as St. Peter's were unable to fulfil the fixture.)	1–4
Carluke Rovers	2–5	5–3		1–2	2–2	0–1	2–3	0–2	2–2	3–1	3–5	0–5	8–2	2–1	1–1	0–5
Easterhouse Academy	1–2	6–0	0–1		2–4	1–3	3–2	3–8	0–3	1–4	5–1	4–0	7–0	3–2	1–7	0–8
East Kilbride Thistle	1–1	1–2	6–1	2–0		2–2	0–3	2–6	3–3	1–4	3–1	5–3	1–2	6–1	1–2	0–7
Eglinton	6–0	4–0	3–3	4–2	2–3		0–4	1–5	2–0	3–6	3–2	3–1	1–2	3–2	0–4	1–3
Giffnock SC	1–3	6–0	4–1	3–2	5–5	4–0		2–1	3–0	2–0	5–1	1–3	10–0	4–2 (Note: Match played at Petershill Park, Springburn.)	4–1	2–4
Glenvale	4–2	4–1 (Note: Match played at Barrfields, Largs, due to renovations at Ferguslie Sports Centre.)	3–1 (Note: Match played at McKenna Park, Shieldhall.)	3–2 (Note: Match played at McKenna Park, Shieldhall.)	6–1 (Note: Match played at McKenna Park, Shieldhall.)	4–0 (Note: Match played at McKenna Park, Shieldhall.)	4–3 (Note: Match played at McKenna Park, Shieldhall, due to renovations at Ferguslie Sports Centre.)		4–2 (Note: Match played at McKenna Park, Shieldhall.)	1–2 (Note: Match played at McKenna Park, Shieldhall.)	3–2	0–3	4–1	8–0 (Note: Match played at McKenna Park, Shieldhall.)	5–0 (Note: Match played at McKenna Park, Shieldhall.)	4–3 (Note: Match played at McKenna Park, Shieldhall.)
Knightswood	2–1	0–3 (Note: Match played at North Kelvinside Primary School 3G, North Kelvinside.)	3–1 (Note: Match played at North Kelvinside Primary School 3G, North Kelvinside.)	2–4 (Note: Match played at North Kelvinside Primary School 3G, North Kelvinside.)	1–8 (Note: Match played at Kilsyth Sports Field, Kilsyth.)	2–1 (Note: Match played at North Kelvinside Primary School 3G, North Kelvinside.)	3–1	3–3 (Note: Match played at North Kelvinside Primary School 3G, North Kelvinside.)		3–4 (Note: Match played at North Kelvinside Primary School 3G, North Kelvinside.)	1–1	1–3 (Note: Match played at Holm Park, Clydebank.)	5–4 (Note: Match played at North Kelvinside Primary School 3G, North Kelvinside.)	4–3 (Note: Match played at North Kelvinside Primary School 3G, North Kelvinside.)	2–4	0–2 (Note: Match played at North Kelvinside Primary School 3G, North Kelvinside.)
Lugar Boswell Thistle	2–1	3–2	2–2	5–1	3–1	4–1	3–2	1–0	1–2		4–0	1–1	3–1	8–0	0–3	0–2
Newmains United	1–4	2–1	5–1	7–3	5–5	3–3	4–6	0–6	0–2	0–3		1–5	1–3	6–0	1–1	0–4
Rossvale	4–3	7–2	6–0	2–1	3–2	0–2	1–0	0–1	3–2	2–2	1–0		3–1	3–0	6–2	1–5
Royal Albert	0–1	3–3	1–1	0–2	1–3	0–3	1–1	2–4	5–1	0–4	0–1	1–6		3–2	3–2	2–0
Saltcoats Victoria	5–3	4–0	0–2	4–0	1–10	0–0	2–7	2–5	2–3	0–4	1–2	2–3	4–2		0–4	2–6
St. Peter's	4–1	8–0	3–1	1–1	2–2	0–1	0–1	0–3 (Note: Match awarded to Glenvale, as St. Peter's were unable to fulfil the fixture.)	1–4	1–3	2–0	1–2	1–2	4–0		1–1
Thorn Athletic	8–2	4–1	4–0	0–1	2–1	3–0	2–3 (Note: Match played at New Tinto Park, Drumoyne.)	2–2	2–0	5–1	2–2	2–2	6–1 (Note: Match played at New Tinto Park, Drumoyne.)	5–1	3–0	

Source: wosfl.co.uk
Legend: Blue = home team win; Yellow = draw; Red = away team win.

== Notes ==
^{SFA} Club with an SFA licence; eligible to participate in the Lowland League promotion play-off (should they win the Premier Division), and also compete in the Scottish Cup.
