= Luma Tower =

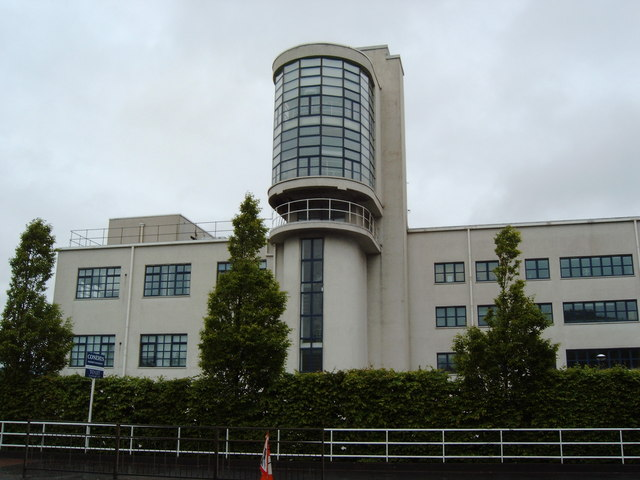
- Luma Tower from Shieldhall Road.
- Former names: Luma Light Bulb Factory, Caravanland

General information
- Status: Completed
- Type: Residential
- Architectural style: Art Deco
- Location: Shieldhall, Glasgow, Scotland
- Coordinates: 55°51′35.61″N 4°20′49.82″W
- Completed: 1938
- Owner: Linthouse Housing Association
- Height: 25.6 metres (84 ft)

Design and construction
- Architect(s): Cornelius Armour

The Luma Tower is a residential building and former factory in the Greater Govan area of Glasgow, Scotland. It is famous as one of the best preserved examples of Art Deco architecture in the city. It has been protected as a category B listed building since 1988. Designed by Scottish architect Cornelius Armour, who was the in-house architect of the Scottish Co-operative Wholesale Society, the style is known as Streamline Moderne which was the last phase of the Art Deco era in the 1930s.

== History ==
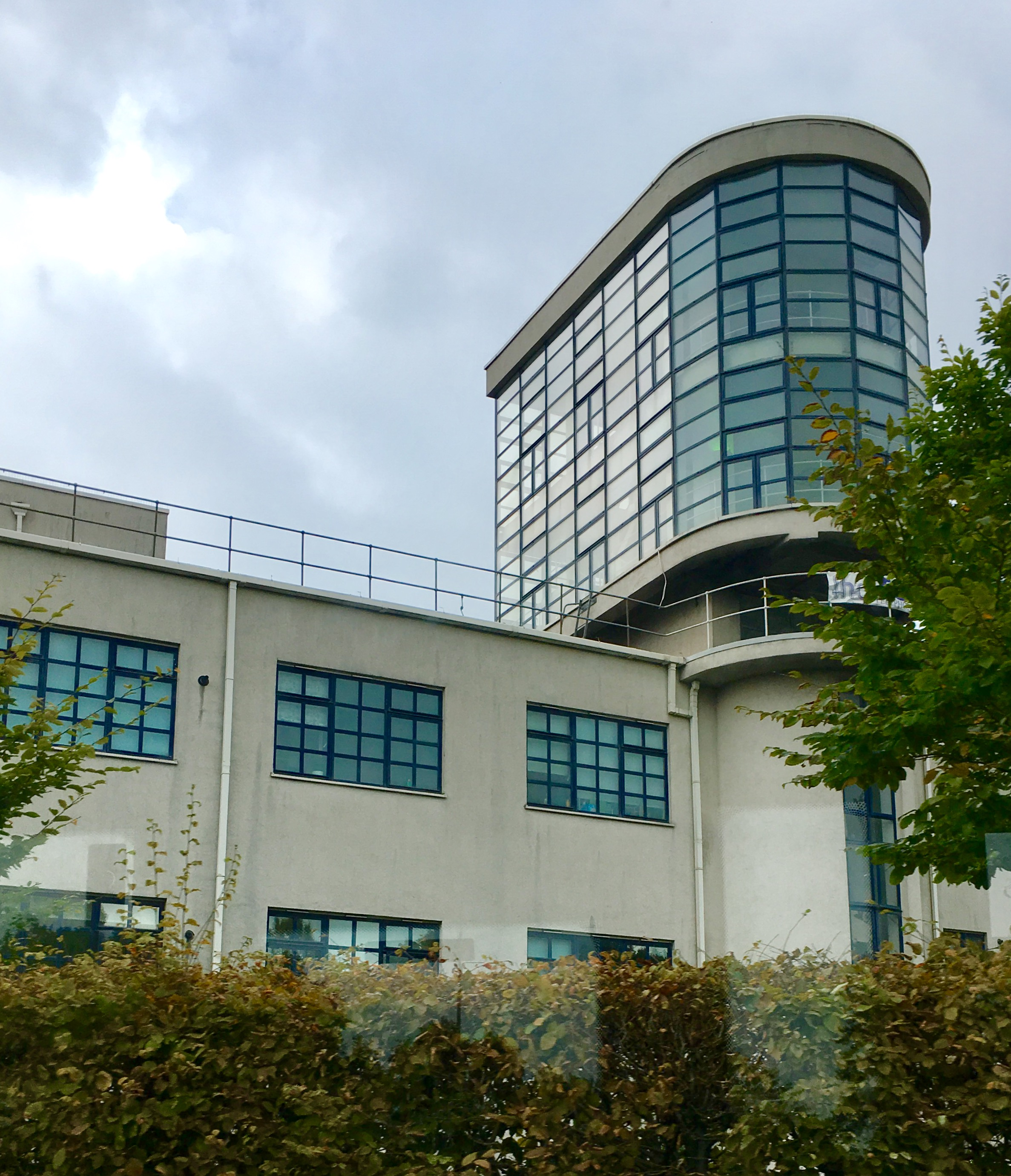
Luma Tower, Glasgow

Located in the western suburb of Shieldhall (today on the A8 road and between the M8 motorway to the south and the Queen Elizabeth University Hospital complex to the north), the building was constructed in 1938 as a light bulb factory and was the Glasgow headquarters of the British Luma Co-operative Electric Lamp Society Ltd, a joint venture by the Co-operative Wholesale Society (CWS), the Scottish Co-operative Wholesale Society (SCWS) and their Swedish counterpart the Swedish Co-operative Union. The Luma co-operative was a response to the controlling influence on light bulb manufacturing by the Phoebus cartel. The architecture has a similar style to the Swedish Co-operative Union's own Luma factory in Stockholm built in 1930 designed by their in-house architects.

Its distinctive feature is the protruding tower (resembling an airport control tower) which was originally used to test light bulbs beyond their design voltage for longevity. The light emitted from the testing tower lit up the surrounding area at night. During WWII testing was not allowed during the blackout and the Royal Observer Corps used it as a lookout post.

The building was part of the massive Shieldhall Manufacturing Complex that used to stand in the area, and its completion was also intended as a symbol of the Empire Exhibition of that year which was held in nearby Bellahouston Park.

Following the ending of light bulb manufacture at the plant the building was sold and, amongst other uses, was used as a caravan showroom before finally falling into dereliction in the 1980s.

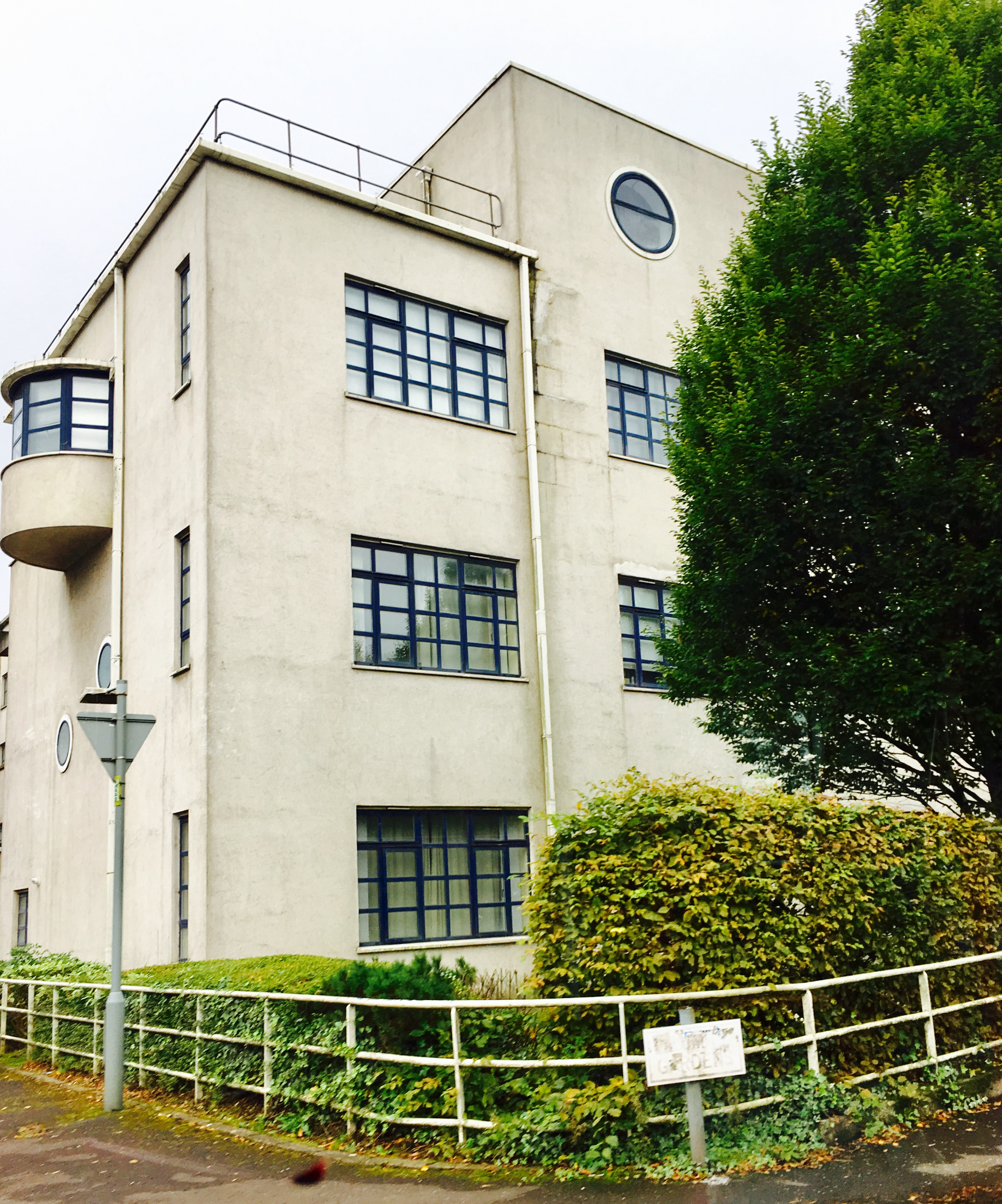
Luma Tower, Glasgow

In 1993, a local housing association acquired the decaying building amid fears it would be demolished, and began the process of it restoring it and converted it into affordable housing. In the end, forty-three new apartments were created, with a further twelve in a creative reproduction of the original building's style to the rear. The tower element is now illuminated with blue neon lighting and is a noticeable landmark around Govan, and it can be clearly seen from the westbound carriageway of the M8 motorway between Junctions 24 and 25.
