= Shieldhall =

Coordinates: 55.861278°N 4.346415°W

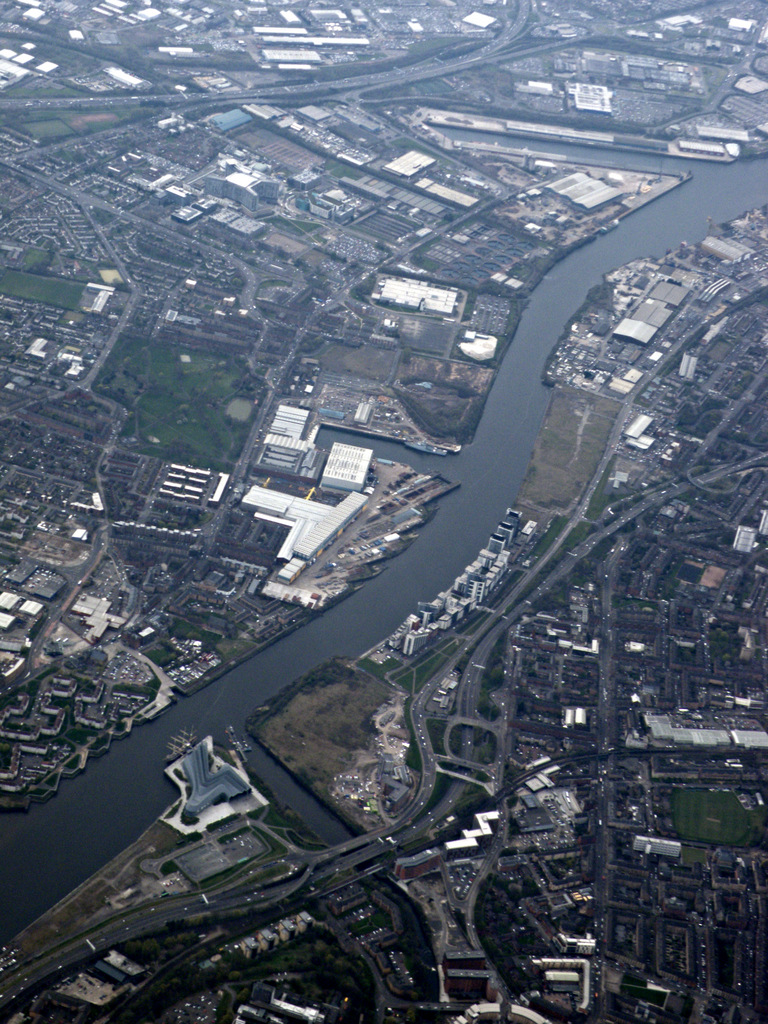
- Aerial view of Shieldhall from the east

- Location within Glasgow
- Council area: Glasgow City Council
- Lieutenancy area: Glasgow
- Country: Scotland
- Sovereign state: United Kingdom
- Post town: GLASGOW
- Postcode district: G51
- Dialling code: 0141
- Police: Scotland
- Fire: Scottish
- Ambulance: Scottish
- UK Parliament: Glasgow South West
- Scottish Parliament: Glasgow Pollok

Shieldhall is a district in the Scottish city of Glasgow. It is situated directly south of the River Clyde and is part of the wider Govan area.

== Location and history ==
Taking its name from the country estate which occupied the territory until the late 19th century, Shieldhall lies on the boundary between Glasgow and Renfrewshire, close to the town of Renfrew and the industrial, retail and leisure developments at Braehead which lie to the west. Linthouse and Drumoyne adjoin to the east, but Shieldhall is largely separated from these neighbourhoods by the A739 road which runs north–south from Junction 25 of the M8 motorway (the southern boundary of Shieldhall) under the river inside the Clyde Tunnel which opened in 1963, with Thornwood and Whiteinch on the opposite bank; in addition to vehicles, the tunnel also includes a section for pedestrians and bicycles.

As well as the various buildings of the Southern General Hospital and its 2010s replacement, the imposing 14-storey Queen Elizabeth University Hospital, Shieldhall includes a large industrial area which has been heavily used since the early 1900s, around the King George V Dock which is the only commercial port still in operation within Glasgow. It is the site of one of the four main waste recycling facilities in the city, serving its south-west sector, and of a sewage treatment works, owned by Scottish Water; the sewage works originally opened in 1910 and were rebuilt in 1980. Shieldhall is one of three such facilities in the city, along with Dalmarnock and Daldowie.

There are a number of small clusters of housing from various periods of the 20th century in the area to the south of the hospital complex (including Luma Tower, a distinctive converted art deco lightbulb factory), as well as a small park containing the ground of the local Junior football team, St Anthony's, who moved there in the early 21st century from further along the same main road towards Ibrox. Along with the motorway, this new ground occupies the land previously containing the 'Fifty Pitches', a large expanse of football parks.

The closest railway station connecting to central Glasgow is Cardonald on the opposite side of the M8 motorway, while bus services are regular due to provision for the hospital, as well as the presence of a company (McGill's) operating routes towards Braehead and Paisley via Shieldhall in addition to First Glasgow which dominates the industry within the city.

The physician and author Alexander P. W. Philip (1770–1851) was born and raised in Shieldhall.

In popular culture, the district lends half of its name to the fictional Shieldinch area which is the setting for the BBC Scotland soap opera River City (the other half deriving from Whiteinch) - the show's set is located in Dumbarton).
