= Alexander Philips Wilson Philip =

Alexander Philips Wilson Philip FRS FRSE
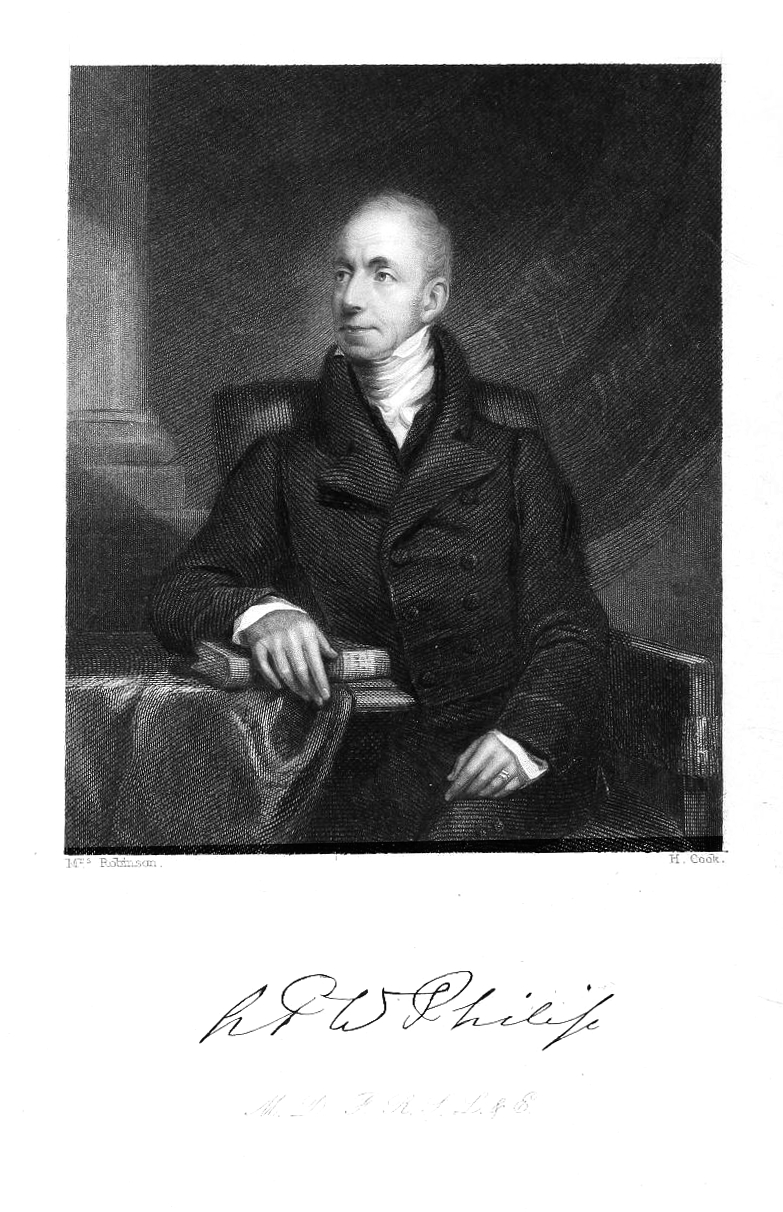
- Philip in c. 1839.

Personal details
- Born: Alexander Philip Wilson; 15 October 1770 Shieldhall, Renfrewshire, Scotland
- Died: c. 1847 France
- Occupation: Physician

Alexander Philips Wilson Philip (born Alexander Philip Wilson; 15 October 1770– c. 1847) was a Scottish medical doctor, physiologist and medical writer. He conducted experimental studies on animal and human physiology particularly dealing with digestion, circulation, and the nervous system. He is thought to have gone bankrupt and fled to France where he died in obscurity.

== Life ==
He was born at Shieldhall, Renfrewshire in Glasgow the son of Agnes Gillespie and her husband, Alexander Wilson. The family estate was sold off in 1781 and Philip changed his surname from Wilson to Philip after the death of his paternal grandmother Susannah Wilson in 1811. Susannah had inherited wealth from her ancestor John Philip who had been governor of St Martin and laird of Almeriecloss, Angus.

He was educated at the High School in Edinburgh then studied medicine at the University of Edinburgh gaining his doctorate (MD) in 1792 and then taking up practice in the city. Early influences included Alexander Adams and he also studied under William Cullen. He became a Fellow of the Royal Medical Society in 1791 and received his doctorate in 1792 with a thesis on an experimental esay on the process of digestion. He conducted several experimented on himself, having orange juice and forcing himself to vomit it the next day to examine the state of digestion. In 1795, aged 25, he was elected a Fellow of the Royal Society of Edinburgh. His proposers were Alexander Monro (secundus), Andrew Duncan, the elder, and William Wright. In 1797 he was elected President of the Royal Medical Society.

In 1798 he went to Winchester in England to practice, staying there until 1802. He then moved to Worcester General Infirmary until 1817. He became noted for his experimental approach. He examined the effect of opium on animals in 1795 and claimed to have been inspired by the work of Felice Fontana (1739-1805). He came to the conclusion, based on microscopic observations on blood vessels in the legs of frogs, that opium affected the brain but through the blood stream. Along with William Cullen he examined febrile diseases and published a four-volume Treatise on febrile diseases from 1799 to 1804 which was dedicated to Matthew Baillie. In 1805 he published Observations on the use and abuse of mercury which suggested that mercury was a useful drug in low doses. He worked at Worcester Infirmary as a physician. Some of the experiments he conducted in the period, based on killing rabbits, demonstrated that the heart worked independently of the brain and spinal nervous system but noted that the heart was influenced by drugs that affected the brain and central nervous system. He moved to London after 1817 and lived in Cavendish Square from around 1824 and became more interested in diet and dyspepsia, possibly due to influential patients in the vicinity. He was elected Fellow of the Royal Society in 1826. In 1834 he suggested that death was the cessation of sensation. Around 1843 he fled to France to avoid debtors' prison and is thought to have died between 1847 and 1851.

== Family ==
Wilson Philip married Mary, daughter of Charles Domvile in 1811. They had three children.

== Publications ==
Until 1811 he wrote as Dr A P Wilson and later as A.P.W. Philip

- An Inquiry into the Remote Cause of Urinary Gravel (1792)
- A Treatise on Febrile Diseases (1801)
- Observations on the Use and Abuse of Mercury (1805)
- An Analysis of the Malvern Waters (1805)
- On the Nature of Sleep (1833)
- The Nervous and Muscular Systems of More Perfect Animals (1833)
- On the Influence of Small Doses of Mercury in Restoring the Functions of Health (1834)
- An inquiry into the nature of sleep and death (1834)
- The Gulstonian Lectures (1835)
- A Treatise on Protracted Indigestion and its Consequences (1842)
