= Gordon Wallace (footballer, born 1949) =

Scottish footballer (1949–2023)

Personal information
- Date of birth: 25 March 1949
- Place of birth: Edinburgh, Scotland
- Date of death: 13 November 2023 (aged 74)
- Position: Forward

Youth career
- Penicuik Athletic

Senior career*
Years	Team	Apps	(Gls)
1970–1977	Raith Rovers	223	(76)
1977–1979	Dundee United	14	(3)
1979–1980	Berwick Rangers	19	(3)
1980–1981	Cowdenbeath	11	(1)
1981–	Green Gully		
Total		267	(83)
- * Club domestic league appearances and goals

Gordon Wallace (25 March 1949 – 13 November 2023) was a Scottish footballer who played as a forward in the Scottish Football League for Raith Rovers, Dundee United, Berwick Rangers and Cowdenbeath.

== Career ==
Born in Edinburgh on 25 March 1949, Gordon Wallace played junior football for Penicuik Athletic before joining Raith Rovers in 1970. Arriving at Stark's Park shortly after the departure of another player named Gordon Wallace, Wallace was familiarly referred to at Raith as "Gordon Wallace Mark II". After 223 league appearances for Raith scoring 76 goals, a £12,000 transfer in 1977 took him to Dundee United, where he would become a teammate of his namesake. Blighted by injury he played 15 league games over two seasons scoring three goals.

Wallace's time at United was disrupted by injury, with his recovery from a cartilage operation being followed by the discovery of a ligament problem. After recovering, he only played for the reserve team during his second season at the club and was transferred to Berwick Rangers in 1979, where he spent eighteen months and scored three goals in 19 league appearances. After a short spell at Cowdenbeath, scoring once in 11 league appearances, he moved to Australia in 1981, where he played for Melbourne club Green Gully.

== Death ==
Wallace died on 12 November 2023, at the age of 74.
