= Ardrossan Winton Rovers F.C. =

Association football club in Scotland

Ardrossan Winton Rovers
- Full name: Ardrossan Winton Rovers Football Club
- Nickname: The Winton
- Founded: 1900
- Ground: The Billy Gilmour Stadium, Ardrossan
- Capacity: 3500
- Coordinates: 55°38′36″N 4°48′26″W
- Chairman: Pat Breen
- Manager: Tony McInally
- League: West of Scotland League Premier Division
- 2025–26: West of Scotland League First Division, 4th of 16 (promoted)
- Website: https://www.wintonroversfc.org.uk
Home colours	Away colours

Ardrossan Winton Rovers Football Club are a Scottish football club from Ardrossan in North Ayrshire. Formed in 1900 as a Juvenile club before joining the Junior ranks in 1903 they are based at Winton Park and are nicknamed "The Winton". The club colours are Black and White, currently and historically hoops, but all white shirts and black and white stripes have also been used. The change colour is all sky blue. They compete in the West of Scotland League Premier Division. They won the Ayrshire District League in 2014–15 and were promoted to the SJFA Super League First Division for the 2015–16 season. One of their ex-players, Bobby Watson, went on to play professionally for Rangers and later semi-professionally for Fleetwood Town and Blackpool.

== Winton Park ==
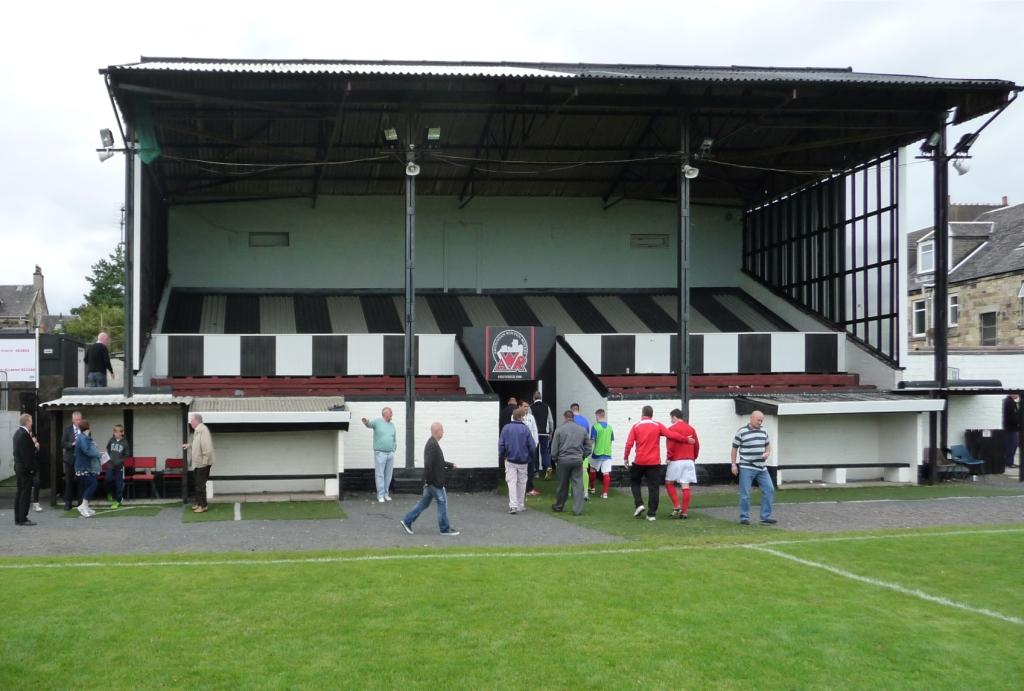
Main stand, Winton Park, Ardrossan, 10 Aug 2013

Winton Park has been the home of Winton Rovers for most of their existence and was bought from Lord Eglinton in 1923 for £160. The park originally ran in an East West direction, the park was turned to its current North South direction prior to Bells Nursery selling a strip of land to them for £50. The grandstand was built around 1956.

The pitch is approx 115 yards long by 68 wide and the ground capacity is approx 3000. There are four separate areas of covered terracing and the stand seats approximately 100 people. There are also floodlights but these are not used for matches, except midweek friendlies. On match days there is the opportunity to get refreshments and a regular match programme is also produced.

== Current squad ==
As of 11 November 2026

Note: Flags indicate national team as defined under FIFA eligibility rules; some limited exceptions apply. Players may hold more than one non-FIFA nationality.

No.	Pos.	Nation	Player
—	GK	SCO	Jamie Barclay
—	DF	SCO	Alex Dean
—	DF	SCO	David Gray
—	DF	SCO	Sam Lidington
—	DF	SCO	Declan McFadyen
—	DF	SCO	Craig Pettigrew
—	DF	SCO	Arran Preston
—	DF	SCO	George Sewell
—	DF	SCO	Zack Simpson
—	MF	SCO	David Anderson

No.	Pos.	Nation	Player
—	MF	SCO	Darren Frye
—	MF	SCO	Findlay Frye
—	MF	SCO	Harvey Gilmour
—	MF	SCO	Sam McCloskey
—	MF	SCO	Ally Taylor
—	MF	SCO	David Struthers
—	MF	SCO	Michael Wardrope
—	FW	SCO	Ewan McIver
—	FW	SCO	Thomas Miller

== Coaching staff ==
As of 10 October 2026

Position	Name
Manager	Tony McInally
Assistant Manager	Stewart Ralston
Goalkeeping Coach	Brian Whelan
Kit Manager/Sports First Aider	Scott Cathcart
Physio/Sports Therapist	Mark Bellew

== Honours ==
Honour	Year
West of Scotland Football League – Second Division	2023-24
SJFA West Region – Ayrshire District League	2010–11, 2014–15
North Ayrshire Cup	2006–07, 2007–08, 2008–09
West of Scotland Cup	1934–35
West of Scotland Consolation Cup	1935–36
Western League	1919–20, 1933–34
Western League Div II	1978–79, 1988–89, 1997–98
Western League Cup	1935–36
Kilmarnock and District League	1907–08
Irvine and District League	1909–10, 1911–12
Ayrshire Cup	1926–27, 1933–34, 1950–51, 1951–52
Ayrshire District Cup	1911–12, 1919–20, 1926–27, 1935–36, 1978–79
Cunningham Cup	1989–90, 1990–91, 1992–93
Supercup	1990–91
Ayrshire Consolation Cup	1912–13, 1919–20, 1922–23, 1948–49
Vernon Trophy	1948–49
Moore Trophy	1930–31, 1931–32
Land O’Burns Cup	1951–52, 1956–57
Irvine Herald Cup	1911–12, 1931–32
St Vincent de Paul Cup	1935–36
Scottish Junior Cup Semi-finalists	1911–12, 1933–34, 1969–70

== See also ==
- Category:Ardrossan Winton Rovers F.C. players
