= Dave Moyes =

Scottish footballer (1955–2024)

Personal information
- Full name: David Moyes
- Date of birth: 14 October 1955
- Place of birth: Haddington, Scotland
- Date of death: 16 April 2024 (aged 68)
- Position: Defender

Youth career
- Preston Athletic

Senior career*
| Years | Team | Apps | (Gls) |
| 1975–1983 | Berwick Rangers | 218 | (13) |
| 1983–1985 | Meadowbank Thistle | 42 | (1) |
| 1985–1987 | Dunfermline Athletic | 38 | (2) |
| 1987–1988 | Berwick Rangers | 35 | (0) |
| Total | | 333 | (16) |
- * Club domestic league appearances and goals

David Moyes (14 October 1955 – 16 April 2024) was a Scottish professional footballer who played as a defender. He started his career at Preston Athletic before signing for Berwick Rangers in 1975. He stayed at Berwick for eight years and was a key member of the squad which won the Second division title in 1979. He moved to Meadowbank Thistle in 1983 and Dunfermline Athletic in 1985 before returning to Berwick in 1987. He retired in 1988 after making over 300 appearances in the Scottish Football League including 253 appearances for Berwick. Moyes died on 16 April 2024, at the age of 68.
