= Drumoyne =

Coordinates: 55.855152°N 4.332379°W

Drumoyne: Scottish Gaelic: Druim Uaine
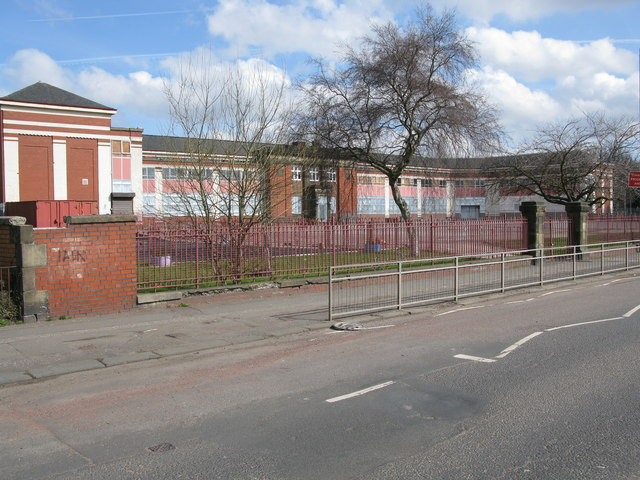
- Former Drumoyne Primary School on Shieldhall Road

- Location within Glasgow
- OS grid reference: NS541649
- Council area: Glasgow City Council
- Lieutenancy area: Glasgow
- Country: Scotland
- Sovereign state: United Kingdom
- Post town: GLASGOW
- Postcode district: G51
- Dialling code: 0141
- Police: Scotland
- Fire: Scottish
- Ambulance: Scottish
- UK Parliament: Glasgow South West
- Scottish Parliament: Glasgow Pollok

Drumoyne (/drʌˈmɔɪn/; Scottish Gaelic: Druim Uaine) is now a district in the Scottish city of Glasgow. It is situated south of the River Clyde and is part of the former Burgh of Govan.

It is the birthplace of Sir Alex Ferguson, manager of Manchester United football club from November 1986 to 2013, the most successful manager in English football, in terms of championship-winning seasons. He was born at 357 Shieldhall Road on 31 December 1941, the home of his grandparents, although he grew up at a tenement in nearby Govan. His birthplace still exists today.

The suburb of Drummoyne in Sydney, Australia was named after the family home of William Wright, who hailed from the area.
