= Radlett strategic rail freight interchange =

Road rail interchange terminal in England

- Interactive map of Radlett strategic rail freight interchange

Location
- Country: England
- Location: Radlett, Hertfordshire
- Coordinates: 51.7151°N 0.3276°W

Details
- Built: 2024
- Owned by: SEGRO
- Land area: 3,570,010 square feet (331,665 m^{2})

Radlett strategic rail freight interchange is future road/rail interchange north of the town of Radlett, in Hertfordshire, England. The site largely occupies land formerly used as Radlett Aerodrome, with the purchase of this land contested by local residents and the council as it was earmarked for recreational and housing purposes. It will be one of twenty so named strategic rail freight interchanges throughout the UK, and the first one to serve the London area.

== History ==
In 2006, developer Helioslough put forward a plan for building a strategic rail freight interchange (SRFI) on the site of Radlett Aerodrome. This was contested by St Albans City and District Council through various appeals, until planning permission for the site was awarded by the government in 2014 under the then Secretary of State for Communities, Eric Pickles. From 2014 then until 2020, St Albans City & District Council fought the approval process through appeals. In 2023, SEGRO acquired a further 1,000 acres (400 ha) of land, at a cost of £120 million, to enable the plan to go ahead. This land sale by Hertfordshire County Council was then subject to a legal challenge on the grounds that the land was purchased in 1985 as an open space.

The plan from 2014 envisioned requisitioning a land area of 3,570,010 square feet (331,665 m^{2}), with a 24-hour operation and seven or more trains arriving at the interchange daily. The plan also claimed it would support 3,400 jobs.

Initial work on access to the site started in October 2024, with the building of a 60-metre (200 ft), 6,000-tonne (6,600-ton) bridge, which will allow the railway spur from the Midland Main Line to access the freight park by travelling under the main railway lines. When open, the SRFI will be the only one to serve the London area, and it will be one of twenty proposed SRFIs across Britain.

== See also ==
- Strategic rail freight interchange
