= William Orr (trade unionist) =

Australian trade unionist

- William Orr, addressing a meeting of mining unionists in 1937
- Born: 25 April 1900; Bellshill, Lanarkshire, Scotland
- Died: 9 March 1954 (aged 53); Canley Vale, New South Wales, Australia
- Occupations: Coal miner, trade unionist

William Orr (25 April 1900 – 9 March 1954) was an Australian coal miner and trade unionist.

== Early life ==
Orr was born in Scotland, and worked in the coal industry there before serving in the 14th Highland Light Infantry in World War I. When his military service ended, he migrated to Australia, settling in Lithgow, New South Wales. There, he continued to work as a coal miner.

== Career ==
In his late twenties, Orr became active in the Australian labour movement, and became a prominent member of the Unemployed Workers' Movement and the Mineworkers' Council of Action. As part of his role with the Mineworker's Council of Action, he was also the national organiser for Australia's Militant Minority Movement, and he was elected as General Secretary of the Australian Coal and Shale Employees' Federation in 1933 as a result of his involvement with these groups. This made Orr the first Communist in Australia to hold such a high-ranking position within a trade union.

Orr's Communist sympathies were well known, and he was often at odds with the establishment. On one occasion his suggestion that striking miners should be armed (to protect themselves from strike-breakers and police) resulted in a charge of incitement to murder. He was cleared of the offence in court.

Orr was a competent organiser, orator and arbitrator, and during the 1930s was able to gain a number of major concessions for miners as a result of strike action and negotiation. Actions and discussions which he organised were responsible for the introduction of a 40-hour working week for miners below ground, the appointment of a Health and Safety Commission for Mines, and a Royal Commission which resulted in the Coal and Oil Shale Mine Workers' (Pensions) Act of 1941, improving miners' retirement options.

== Later years and death ==
Ill health prompted Orr to resign his position with the Federation in 1940, but by 1942 was well enough to represent the Federation as a member of the Commonwealth Coal Board. From 1947 to 1953, he also served on the pensions tribunal, representing the miners. Orr died in 1954 as a result of coronary thrombosis.
