= Andy Swallow =

Scottish association football player

Personal information
- Full name: Andrew Swallow
- Birth name: Andrew Kregsdis
- Date of birth: 11 August 1904
- Place of birth: Bellshill, Scotland
- Date of death: 15 June 1969 (aged 64)
- Place of death: Perth, Scotland
- Height: 5 ft 9 1/2 in (1.77 m)
- Positions: Centre half; left half

Senior career*
Years	Team	Apps	(Gls)
–	Shettleston		
1924–1930	St Johnstone	179	(6)
1930–1935	Millwall	40	(3)
1935–1936	Morton	31	(0)
Total		250	(9)
- * Club domestic league appearances and goals

Andrew Swallow (11 August 1904 – 15 June 1969) was a Scottish footballer who played as a centre half or left half.

A member of North Lanarkshire's Lithuanian immigrant community and registered at birth with the surname Kregždė (anglicised to Kregsdis, this translates to swallow which was subsequently adopted by the family) he began his senior career with St Johnstone, newly promoted to Scottish Division One in November 1924. From then he was a regular presence in the Saints defence alongside the likes of Hugh Lafferty and Willie Imrie, making nearly 200 appearances in the league and Scottish Cup as the Perth club maintained their top-level status until the end of the 1929–30 season when they were relegated, at which point Swallow departed, moving on to English football with Millwall. He played less regularly for the Lions than he had in Scotland, making 40 appearances across five years (four in the Football League Second Division and the last in the Third Division South). In 1935 he returned north of the border and spent one season with Morton. He spent his later life working as a bookmaker's clerk in Perth, his wife's hometown.

Swallow was a member of a Scottish Football Association party which toured North America in 1927, but never received a full cap for Scotland.
