= Bellshill Central Parish church =

Coordinates: 55.8191°N 4.0162°W

Bellshill Central Parish Church
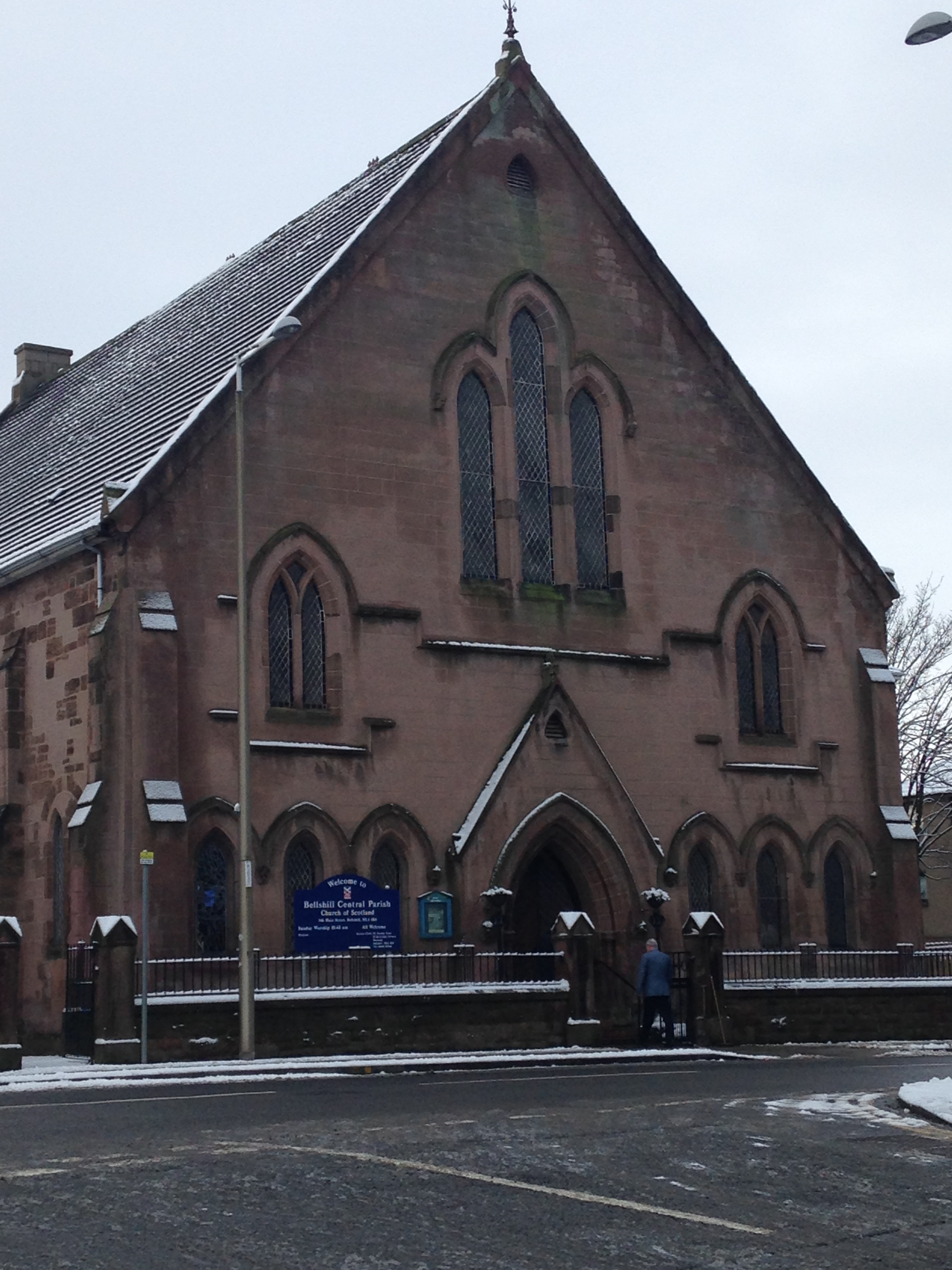
- Bellshill Central Parish Church
- Bellshill Central Parish Church
- Location: 346 Main Street, Bellshill, ML4 1BA
- Country: Scotland
- Denomination: Church of Scotland
- Website: www.bellshillcentral.wordpress.com

History
- Status: Church

Architecture
- Functional status: Active

Administration
- Parish: Bellshill

Bellshill Central Parish Church is a Parish church of the Church of Scotland, serving the areas of Bellshill town centre, Mossend, Milnwood and Orbiston. It is within the Church of Scotland's Presbytery of Hamilton.

== The building ==
The main church building and hall was designed by David Clunas and constructed in 1874. It is described as a Gothic, gabled rectangular-plan church with set-back gabletted buttresses with pairs of Gothic rectangular windows with inverted rounded corners and vertical stone mullions, on both upper and lower levels. It is set back from the main road and the principal elevation has a pointed-arch timber panelled door to centre. Flanking hooded pointed-arch lancet windows; large hooded pointed-arch triple light window above with tracery and stone mullions. There is a cast iron decorative finial at the apex. BOUNDARY: small squared sandstone wall with saddleback coping and modern railings and gate furniture.

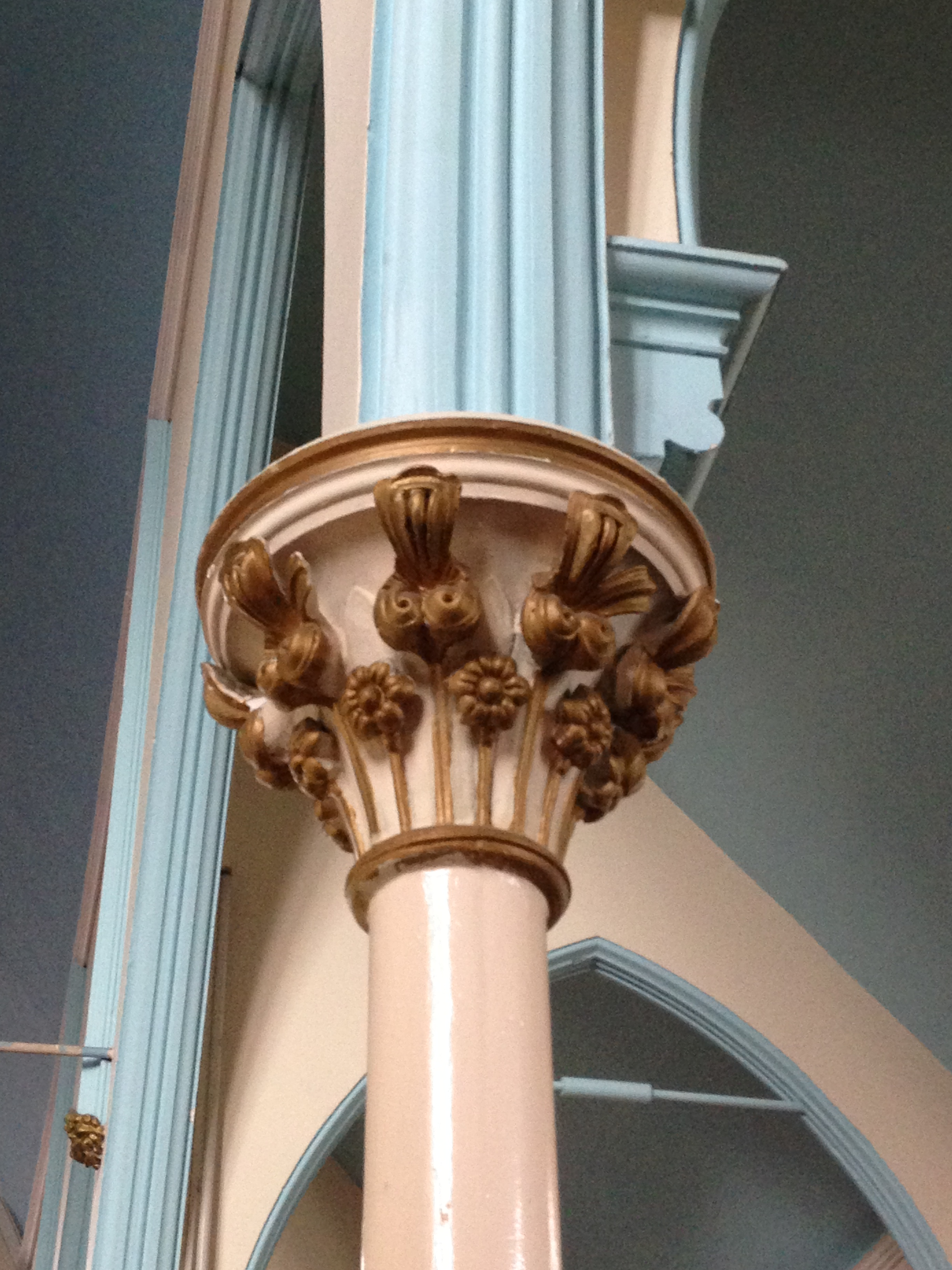
A Gothic pillar capital

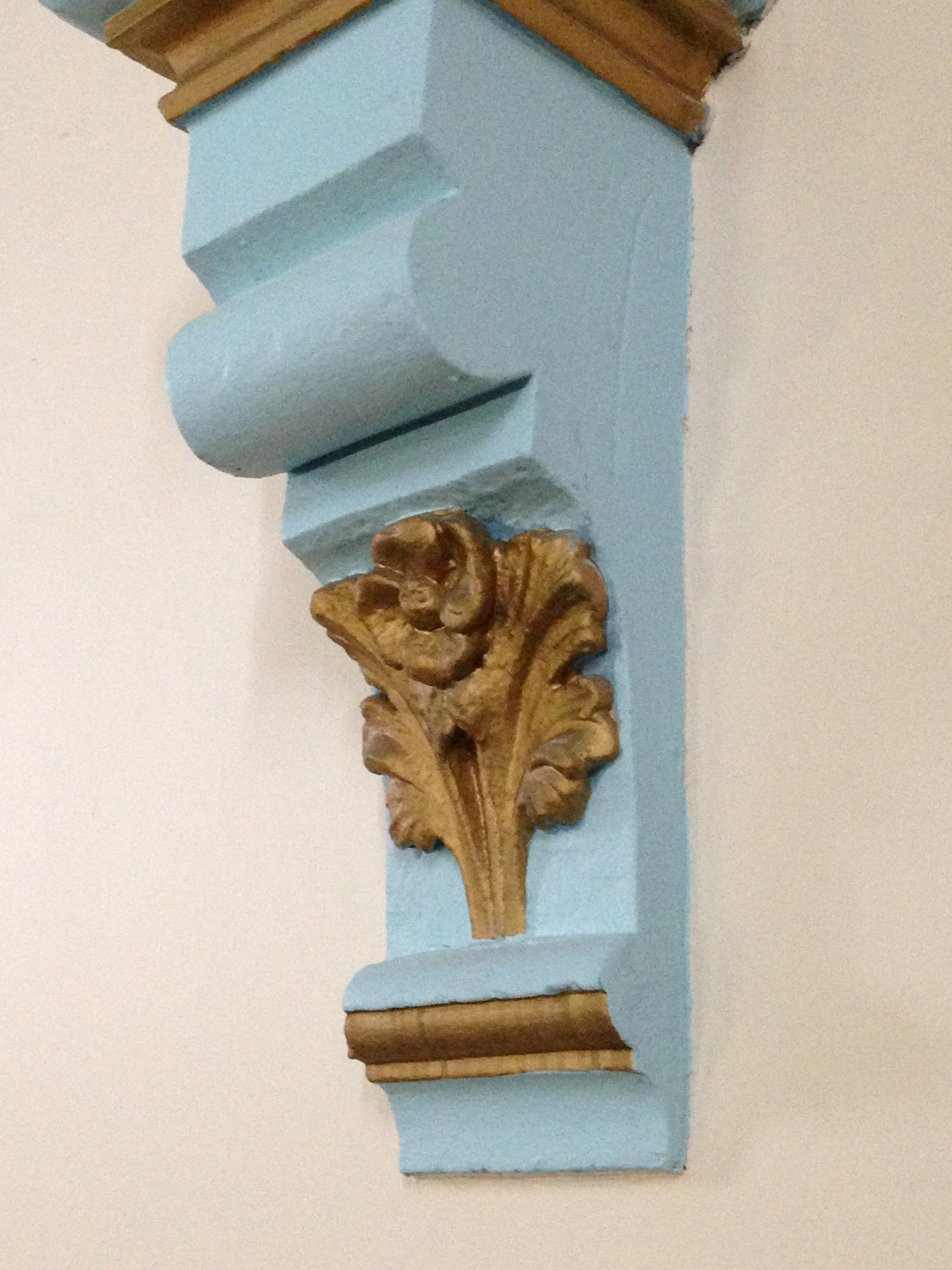
A Gothic arch corbel

There is a galleried interior, narthex with flanking stairs to gallery. Boarded dado. Timber pews. Cast-iron columns supporting panelled gallery. Communion table in front of timber pulpit with stair access and timber Gothic panelled organ and case behind. A notable feature of the building are the vast array of stained glass windows adorning the sanctuary and narthex. The most recently installed stained glass window was designed and executed by a Church Member, Lesley Marshall, and is located in the narthex.

The Church Hall is located immediately behind the church building and is accessed down each side of the church at two entrances. The hall was refurbished following the sale of the former manse (located also at 346 Main Street) and the former Blackie Memorial Hall. The hall building consists of a large hall, male/female and disabled toilets, office and large kitchen.

== History ==
Bellshill Central Parish Church was formed by the union of the former MacDonald Memorial and Orbiston Churches. The suite of buildings chosen by the Church of Scotland for use of the new united congregation was the buildings at 346 Main Street (formerly MacDonald Memorial Church). The former Orbiston buildings continue in community use as the base for the Orbiston Neighbourhood Centre.

Macdonald Memorial Church began in 1873 as a Free Church Mission, at the recommendation of the Free Church Presbytery of Hamilton and services were for a time held in Mossend school. The charge was sanctioned in 1874. The rapid growth of the population, employed in coal mines and iron works, favoured the development of the congregation. Initial Membership figures were: 143 in 1875, and 477 in 1900. The first Minister was William Macdonald, who the church was renamed after in 1912.

Orbiston Parish Church, being one of the later to be built in the area due to post-war building, was first started as an extension charge in the wooden hall. The dedication service was held on 9 March 1954. With a quickly increasing membership the church on Busby Rd was built with the dedication service held on 13 September 1956 and the first Sunday service was conducted by the minister Rev Albert F Bolton on Sunday 16 September 1956. By 1966 the church had received full Quoda Sacra status and had a membership of almost 500 communicants. It was linked with Bellshill St Andrews Church in October 1980 then linked with MacDonald Memorial Church in 2001.

== Organ ==
Bellshill Central Parish Church houses a rare pipe organ by the H. Hildson organ company of Glasgow. It is a two manual and pedal organ, with detached console. It consists of 17 stops, and accessories. It was refurbished in 2015 by Michael and Andrew Macdonald organ builders from Glasgow. Apart from having its action changed from pneumatic to electric solid state, it has remained tonally unchanged since its construction in 1930. It has been registered on the National Pipe Organ Register.
