= Mossend International Railfreight Park =

Freight-handling station in Mossend, Scotland

Coordinates: 55.8243°N 3.9990°W

Mossend International Railfreight Park (previously known as Mossend Railhead) is a freight-handling station in Mossend, Scotland. It is situated across the line from the Mossend EuroTerminal.

== History ==
Plans to expand the facility were rejected by North Lanarkshire Council in 2014, but the decision was overturned by Scottish ministers the following year. The council subsequently challenged the decision at the Court of Session, where in 2016 the judge ruled in its favour, stating that the Scottish ministers had not given adequate reasoning for overturning the original decision to reject the project.

In 2018, the facility was re-branded as the Mossend International Railfreight Park.

The first phase of the expansion project was approved by the local council in May 2021.

== Future ==
There are plans to expand the facility. Once complete, the facility will operate 24 hours per day and be capable of handling 16 trains each day.

== Operation ==
The facility is operated by Peter D. Stirling Ltd.

== See also ==
- Strategic rail freight interchange
