= Strategic rail freight interchange =

Location of SRFIs; the letters relate to the entries below

A strategic rail freight interchange, or SRFI, is one of several freight terminals in Great Britain where containers can be swapped between nodes of transport, but always involving the use of railway infrastructure. Various governments from across the political spectrum in Britain have supported, or do support, the transfer of freight from road to rail where possible. The SRFIs are intended to run bulk intermodal trains to a point as close as possible to the containers' final destination. SRFIs come under the guidance for a Nationally Significant Infrastructure Project.

== Definition ==
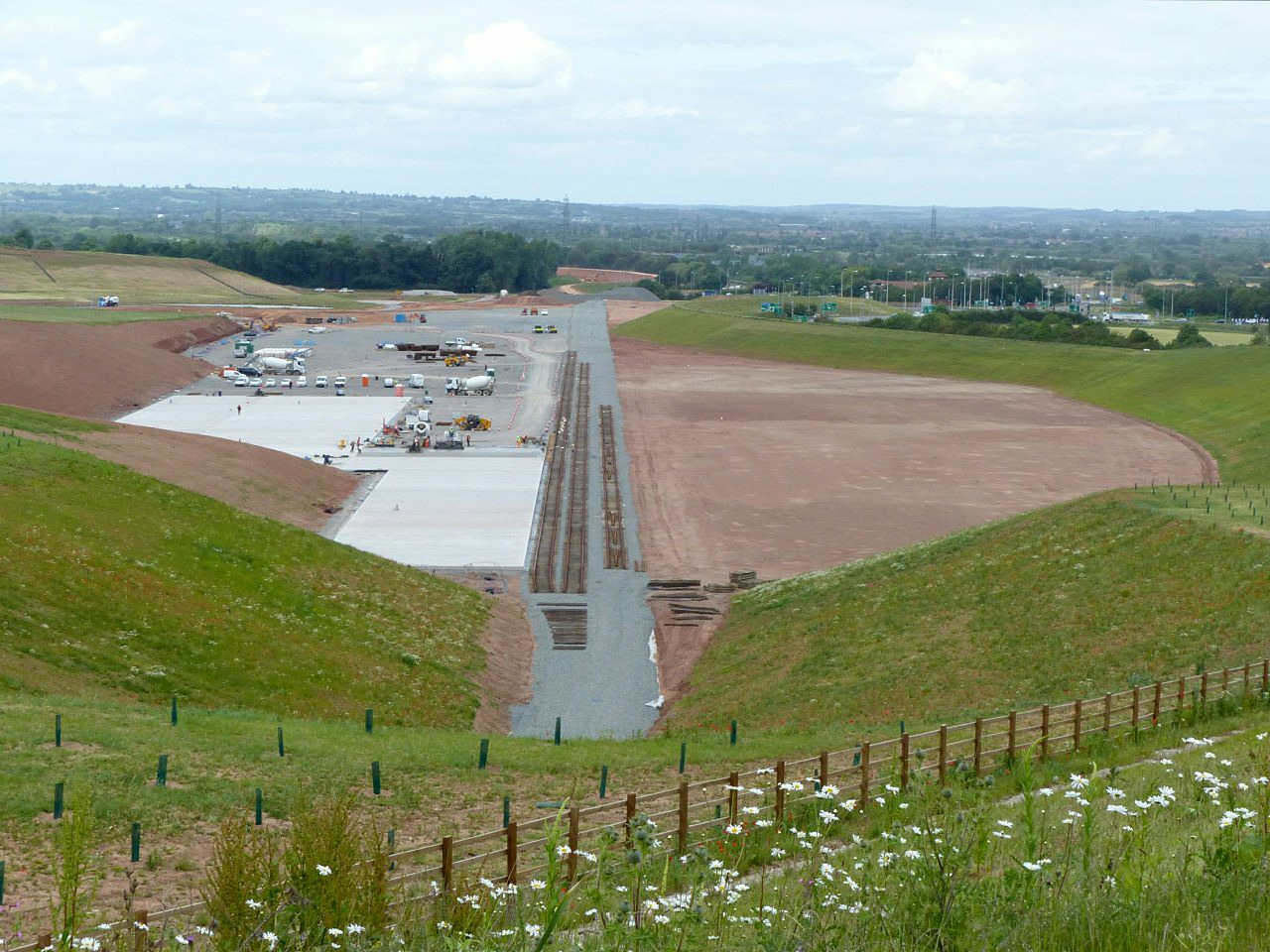
East Midlands Gateway under construction

The Department for Transport 2009 definition of an SRFI was "A Strategic Rail Freight Interchange (SRFI) is a large multi-purpose rail freight interchange containing rail-connected warehousing and container handling facilities. The site may also contain manufacturing and processing activities." Network Rail further clarified that the difference between a Rail Freight Interchange (RFI) and an SRFI, was that an RFI was usually a standalone intermodal terminal (such as Stourton Freightliner Terminal in Leeds), and that an SRFI would be "...[a] Distribution park in excess of 60 hectares (150 acres) with integrated intermodal terminal facilities." An SRFI should also be able to handle at least four incoming trains per day (and have the ability to increase on that number), with train lengths up to 775 metres (2,543 ft), and the appropriate layout to accommodate the length of the trains with minimal shunting necessary. The rail network itself should be capable of handling intermodal trains up to 775 metres (2,543 ft) and the government in 2009, stated that Freight Facilities Grants should be available to enhance infrastructure to accommodate these longer trains. The site should also be connected to the trunk road system.

The policy around SRFIs from the UK government is that the interchanges should be part of a network that provides cost-effective logistics. Many of the existing or proposed SRFIs are in the East and West Midlands, with some being in and around Rugby in Warwickshire and the surrounding area which is known to the logistics industry as the Golden Triangle. The Golden Triangle (or The Golden Logistics Triangle) was first used to describe warehousing in the Midlands area in the 1980s. The area has been determined by the Office of National Statistics (ONS) to cover and area of 289 square miles (750 km^{2}), and be within four-hours driving distance of 90% of the British population. The intermodal points within the Golden Triangle are geographically distant enough from the ports on the coast of Britain to be financially advantageous for rail transport. The planning and policy for SRFIs is covered by a specific guidance for Nationally Significant Infrastructure Projects (NSIPs).

== Operating terminals ==
The entries in the table below are operating or have planning permission and are under construction.

Name	Location	Map	Coordinates (Note: Coordinates centred on the railway sidings)	Details	Operator	Railway connection	Road connection	Ref
Birch Coppice	Dordon	A	52.591°N 1.632°W	The Birch Coppice branch re-opened in 2002 to handle car parts, with intermodal trains following soon after.	Maritime Transport	Birmingham to Nottingham line	A5/M42	
DIRFT I	Daventry	B	52.347°N 1.166°W	Opened in 2007	Malcolm Group	West Coast Main Line (Northampton loop)	M1	
DIRFT II	Daventry	B	52.358°N 1.175°W	Opened in 2005	Sainsbury's/Tesco	West Coast Main Line (Northampton loop)	M1	
DIRFT III	Daventry	B	52.375°N 1.170°W		Prologis	West Coast Main Line (Northampton loop)	M1	
Doncaster iPort	Doncaster	C	53.480°N 1.109°W	Opened in 2018 and covers 800 acres (320 ha)	Medlog	South Yorkshire Joint Railway (to East Coast Main Line)	M18	
East Midlands Gateway	Castle Donington	D	52.840°N 1.300°W	Opened in March 2020, located close to East Midlands Airport	SEGRO	Castle Donington line	M1	
Hams Hall	Lea Marston	E	52.517°N 1.703°W	Hams Hall was opened in 1997 on the site of an old power station.	Maritime Transport	Birmingham–Peterborough line	M42/M6	
Mossend Eurocentral	East Glasgow	F	55.826°N 4.001°W	Opened in 1994, the site has access to the A8, M8, and is 10 minutes from the M74 and M73	DB Cargo	West Coast Main Line	M8	
Mossend International	East Glasgow	G	55.826°N 4.001°W		PD Stirling	West Coast Main Line	M8	
Northampton Gateway	Northampton	H	52.183°N 0.913°W	Opened in summer 2025	Maritime Transport	West Coast Main Line (Northampton loop)	M1	
Wakefield Europort	Normanton	J	53.713°N 1.407°W	January 1996	Maritime Transport	Hallam Line	M62	

== In progress terminals ==
Name	Location	Map	Coordinates (Note: Coordinates as per application documents)	Details	Operator	Railway connection	Road connection	Ref
Radlett	Radlett, Hertfordshire	I	51.715°N 0.327°W	Under construction	SEGRO	Midland Main Line	M25	
West Midlands Interchange	Four Ashes	K	52.685°N 2.121°W	The development will cover over 300 hectares (740 acres) and has been described as a "nationally significant project".	Maritime Transport	Rugby–Birmingham–Stafford line	M6	

== Proposed terminals ==
The entries in the table below are proposed, and are either awaiting planning permission, or are subject to inquiries.

Name	Location	Map	Coordinates (Note: Coordinates as per planning proposal)	Details	Size (Note: Proposed size in hectares at the planning stage)	Operator	Railway connection	Road connection	Ref
East Midlands Intermodal Park	Willington	L	52.864°N 1.587°W			Goodman	Crewe–Derby line	A38/A50	
Gascoigne Interchange	Sherburn-in-Elmet	M	53.778°N 1.209°W	Built on the former coal disposal point at Gascoigne Wood		Harworth	Leeds to Hull line	A63/A1(M)	
Oxfordshire Strategic Rail Freight Interchange (OXSRFI)	Ardley	N	51.931°N 1.221°W	Application is expected to be submitted in November 2025	60 hectares (6,500,000 ft^{2})	Oxfordshire Railfreight Limited	Cherwell Valley Line	M40	
Parkside East	Newton-le-Willows	O	53.448°N 2.602°W	To be built on land opposite the former Parkside Colliery	64.55 hectares (159.5 acres)	Intermodal Logistics Park North	West Coast Main Line, Chat Moss Line	M6 and M62	
Port Salford	Salford	P	53.463°N 2.388°W	Proposed as the first trimodal SRFI in the UK, with direct trans-shipment between road, rail, and ship.	150,000 square metres (1,600,000 ft^{2})	Peel Ports	West Coast Main Line, Chat Moss Line	M60	

== See also ==
- Intermodal railfreight in Great Britain
