= Billy Moffatt =

Scottish footballer

Personal information
- Full name: William John Moffatt
- Date of birth: 30 June 1897
- Place of birth: Bellshill, Scotland
- Date of death: 17 October 1952 (aged 55)
- Place of death: Southsea, England
- Height: 5 ft 8 in (1.73 m)
- Positions: Wing half; full back

Senior career*
Years	Team	Apps	(Gls)
1923–192?	Bellshill Athletic		
192?–1925	Bo'ness		
1925–1930	Portsmouth	130	(2)
1930–1932	Brighton & Hove Albion	21	(0)
- * Club domestic league appearances and goals

William John Moffatt (30 June 1897 – 17 October 1952) was a Scottish professional footballer who played as a wing half or full back in the Scottish League for Bo'ness and in the English Football League for Portsmouth and Brighton & Hove Albion.

== Life and career ==
Moffatt was born in Bellshill, Lanarkshire, in 1897. He played junior football for Bellshill Athletic before joining Bo'ness of Division Two. He captained the team to the quarter-finals of the 1922–23 Scottish Cup, in which they performed well in a 4–2 defeat to Division One club Motherwell despite being handicapped by an injury to Moffatt.

In 1925, he signed for English Second Division club Portsmouth. He soon established himself in the team, and was ever-present in the 1926–27 season in which they were promoted to the First Division. He took his appearance total to 138 before being released in 1930 to join Brighton & Hove Albion of the Third Division South. He was already 32 years old, and Albion used him as a standby player to cover at right back and wing half. In his first season, he contributed to a run of 16 league matches unbeaten that remained a club record until 2015. After two seasons and 23 appearances, he left the Football League for non-league football in the Hampshire area.

Moffatt died in Southsea, Hampshire, in 1952 at the age of 55.
