= East Midlands Gateway =

Rail-served inland port and distribution centre in Leicestershire, England

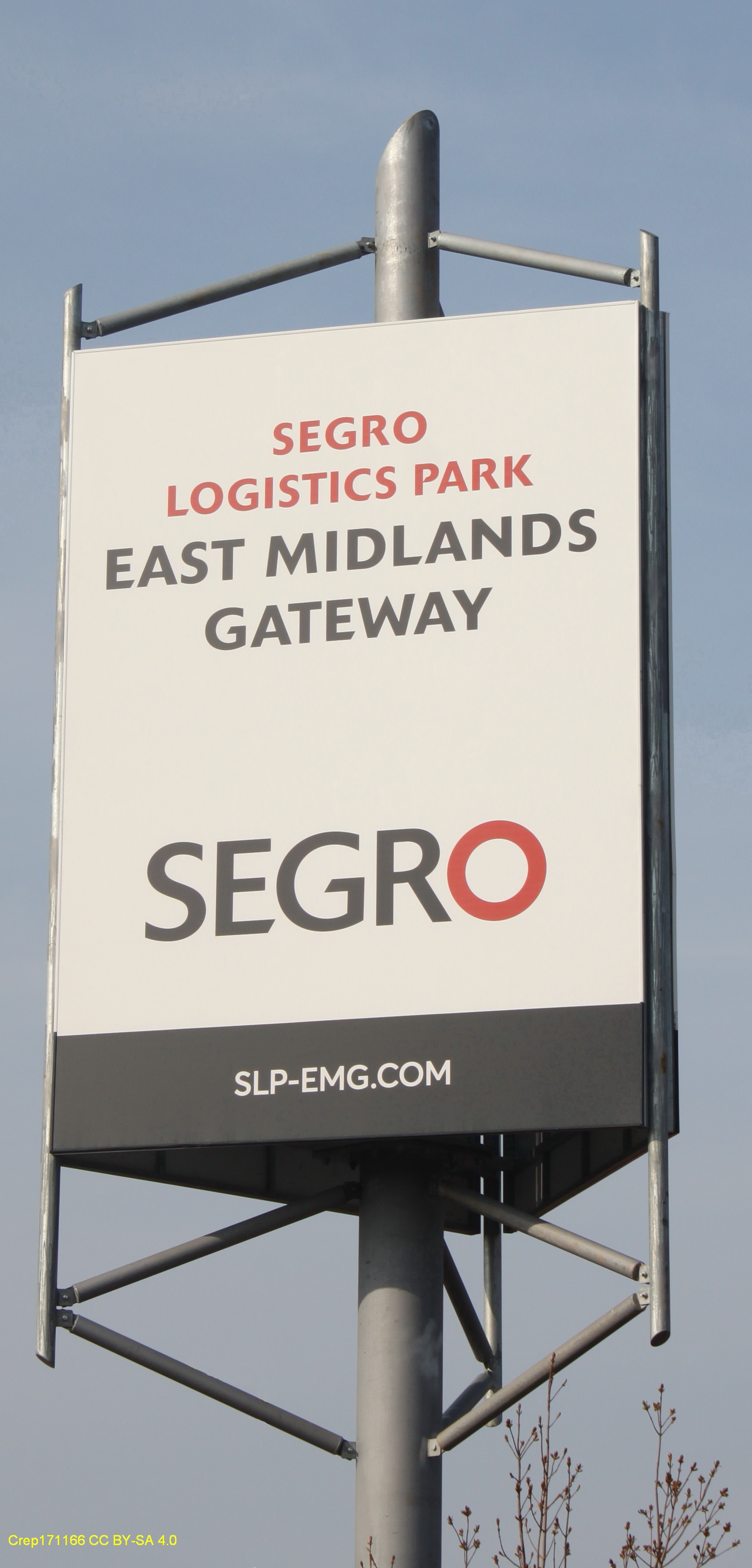
- SLPEMG entrance sign
- Interactive map of East Midlands Gateway

Location
- Location: Kegworth, Leicestershire
- Coordinates: 52.833889°N 1.300806°W

Details
- Built: 2019
- Operated by: SEGRO
- Size: 700 acres (280 ha)

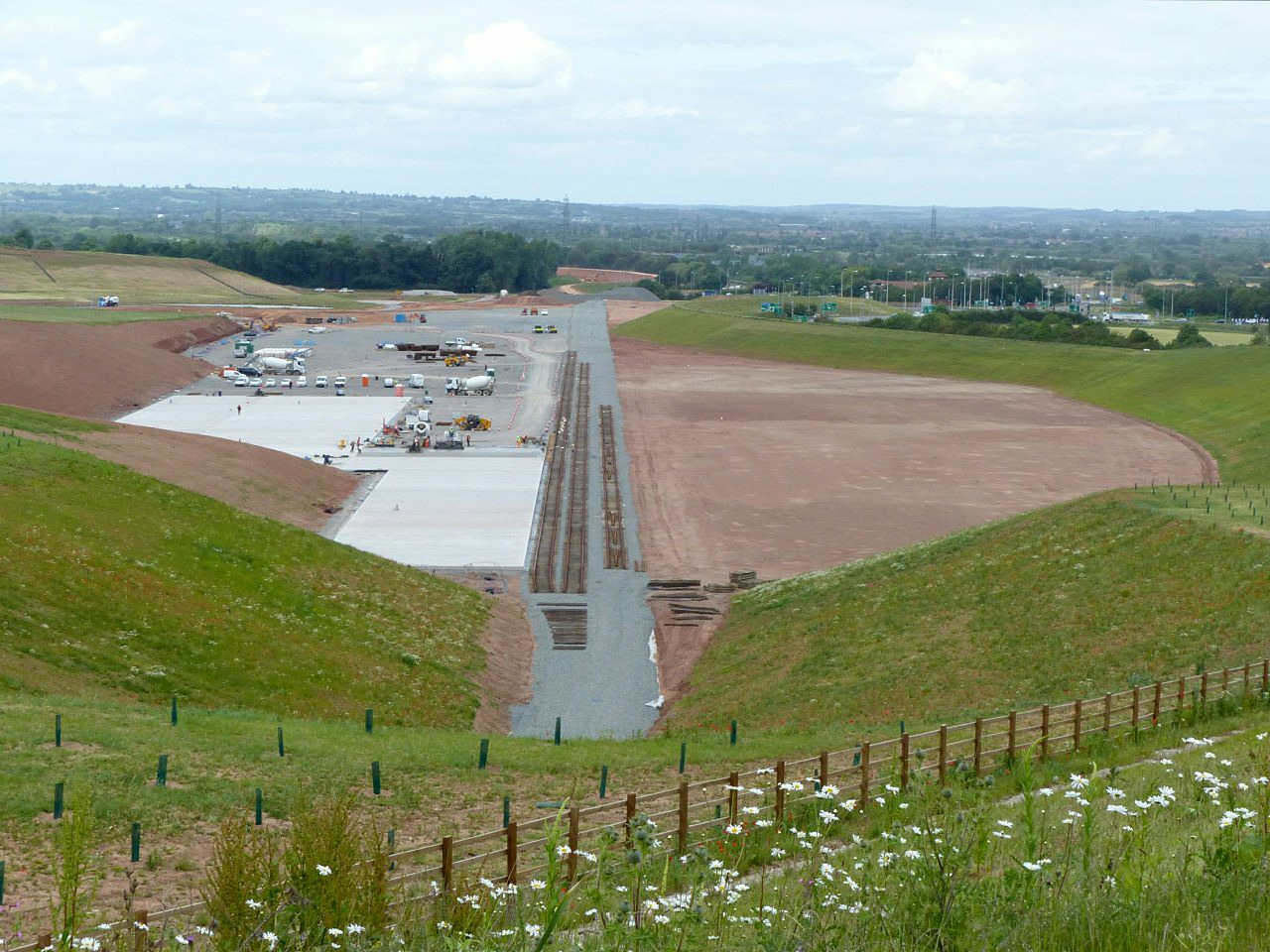
The rail terminal under construction

The East Midlands Gateway is a 700-acre (280 ha) rail freight terminal and intermodal freight centre situated to the west of the village of Kegworth in the English East Midlands. It is operated by SEGRO and officially known as the SEGRO Logistics Park East Midlands Gateway (SLPEMG). It is located within the triangle formed by the cities of Derby (15 km or 9.3 mi), Nottingham (17 km or 11 mi) and Leicester (24 km or 15 mi). It has rail access from the Castle Donington line, road access from junction 24 of the M1 motorway, and lies immediately to the north of East Midlands Airport. It thus unites air, road, and rail freight in a central location.

The gateway comprises purpose-built rail freight terminal, access roads and a number of warehouses and distribution centres, making this distribution hub one of the UK's first inland ports. The rail terminal within the gateway is capable of handling up to 16 trains/day of up to 775 metres (2,543 ft) in length, and has space to store more than 5,000 TEU of shipping containers. It is linked to the railway network by a specially built 3.5-kilometre (2.2 mi) branch line, with trains linking other rail freight interchanges, the Channel Tunnel, and ports such as Southampton, Felixstowe and London Gateway.

As of 2021, ten of the eleven warehouse plots on the site were let, with tenants including Amazon, Arvato, DHL, Games Workshop, Kuehne + Nagel, Shop Direct and XPO, Inc.

From a local government perspective, the terminal spreads across the civil parishes of Kegworth, Lockington-Hemington and Long Whatton and Diseworth, all of which are in the district of North West Leicestershire and the county of Leicestershire.

== History ==
In 2011, the UK government announced a policy to encourage the development of strategic rail freight interchanges in order to support longer-term development of efficient rail freight distribution logistics. Such SRFIs would be key components in national and international networks, facilitating links between UK regions and the European Union. Plans for the development of a strategic rail freight interchange at East Midlands Gateway were first submitted in 2014, and planning hearings commenced the following year.

There were local objections to the proposal leading to the formation of the "J24 Action Group". The main reason for the objections was that the site was green countryside and that other brownfield sites were available. Indeed, there was support for what was seen as the positive environmental impact of moving freight from road to rail if it adopted such a site. The objections included a petition to the then Secretary of State for Communities and Local Government, Rt Hon Eric Pickles MP, which attained 1,331 signatures.

Permission to proceed with the proposal was granted on 2 February 2016, with the introduction of the UK Statutory Instrument, The East Midlands Gateway Rail Freight Interchange and Highway Order 2016. Construction was largely completed in 2019, and the first freight train served the interchange on 7 January 2020.

== See also ==
- Strategic rail freight interchange
