= Bellshill Athletic F.C. =

Association football club in Scotland

Bellshill Athletic
- Full name: Bellshill Athletic Football Club
- Nicknames: The Hill, The Black & Yellows
- Founded: 1897
- Ground: Rockburn Park, Bellshill
- Coordinates: 55°49′43″N 4°1′35″W
- Chairman: James Brown
- Manager: Kieran McGuinness
- League: West of Scotland League First Division
- 2025–26: West of Scotland League Second Division, 1st of 16 (promoted)
| Home colours | Away colours |

Bellshill Athletic Football Club commonly known as Bellshill Athletic is a Scottish football club based in the town of Bellshill, North Lanarkshire. It plays in the West of Scotland League First Division.

== History ==
The history of the club can be traced back as far as 1897 when Bellshill Athletic were founded as a Juvenile club who played at Hawthorn Park. After two successful years as a Juvenile club, Athletic transferred to Junior level. The area had three other clubs at this time - Bellshill Thistle, Mossend Celtic and Mossend Brigade. On 6 August 1902 Bellshill merged with another local club, Clydesdale Wanderers, to form Bellshill & Clydesdale United. This new club only lasted for two seasons before folding, meanwhile a new Bellshill Athletic had been set-up in 1903 and this is the club that still exists today.

In 1975, Andrew Goodwin secured a four figure deal with The Derby Inn (a pub in Mossend), making Bellshill Athletic the first football club in Britain to wear sponsors on their shirts.

The club's early years had it based at many homes. These included Orbiston Park, Douglas Park and Brigade park. The club's previous ground, Brandon Park, was officially opened in 1903 in a friendly against Blantyre Victoria in the month of August that year. On the club's centenary year, they were then based at a new location, New Brandon Park, in the Hattonrigg area of the town. However, due to legal matters with the owner, the club were forced to abandon the ground and, after a brief stint in Blantyre, were permitted to move temporarily to the local Sir Matt Busby Sports Complex. After this agreement expired, the club entered a groundsharing arrangement with Vale of Clyde at their Fullarton Park ground in Tollcross, Glasgow for the 2011–12 season. In 2015, the club moved back to Bellshill at Rockburn Park, while planning to move to a new community facility at Bellshill Academy.

Professional footballer Hughie Gallacher also started his playing career at Bellshill Athletic, before becoming the last person to captain Newcastle United to a top division title. Billy Moffatt was another who started his playing career at Bellshill Athletic.

Bellshill have played at Junior level since 1899, with an exception of a short spell (1927–1931) during which they played in the Intermediate League. As Juniors they have played in four different leagues: the Lanarkshire League, the Scottish League, the Central League and the present West Region. The club were relegated from the Stagecoach Super League Premier Division in season 2009–10.

Bellshill Athletic achieved promotion with managers Dean Muir and Neely Rowatt from the West of Scotland Football League Division 3 in 2024. The joint management team reached back-to-back Scottish Junior Cup quarter-finals losing out at home to Glenafton and Arthurlie, before stepping down at the end of December 2024.

On the 9th of January 2025, Johnny Fallon is appointed the club's manager. On the 28th of December 2026 Kieran McGuinness is the full time manager on an 18 month contract.

== Current squad ==
As of 1st July 2026

Note: Flags indicate national team as defined under FIFA eligibility rules; some limited exceptions apply. Players may hold more than one non-FIFA nationality.

| No. | Pos. | Nation | Player |
|---|---|---|---|
| 1 | GK | SCO | Ross Anderson |
| 2 | DF | SCO | Taylor Crawford |
| 3 | DF | SCO | Jamie Newton |
| 4 | DF | SCO | Brady Craig |
| 5 | DF | SCO | Barry Eley |
| 6 | DF | SCO | Andy Duffy |
| 7 | FW | SCO | Jack Campbell |
| 8 | MF | SCO | Calvin Cowie |
| 9 | FW | SCO | Kieron Markey |
| 10 | MF | SCO | Danny Burns |
| 11 | MF | SCO | Lee Hadden |

| No. | Pos. | Nation | Player |
|---|---|---|---|
| 12 | DF | SCO | Jack McCardle |
| 14 | FW | SCO | Callum Graham |
| 15 | MF | SCO | Jordan Cherrie |
| 16 | MF | SCO | Ross Marchant |
| 17 | FW | SCO | Kieran Findlay |
| 18 | MF | SCO | PJ O'Donnell |
| 19 | GK | SCO | Danny McLean |
| 20 | MF | SCO | Dylan McStravock |
| 21 | DF | SCO | Reece McGuire |
| 22 | DF | SCO | Owen Lee |

== Honours ==
Lanarkshire League Cup

- Winners: 1916-17, 1918-19, 1950-51, 1951-52, 1961-62, 1962-63

Lanarkshire Junior Cup

- Winners: 1912-13, 1918-19, 1951-52

Lanarkshire Junior Consolation Cup

- Winners: 1904-05, 1925-26

Cambuslang & District Junior League

- Winners: 1907-08

Lanarkshire Junior League Division 1

- Winners: 1904-05

Glasgow Junior League

- Winners: 1925-26

Scottish Central Junior League Cup

- Winners: 1949-50

Central Region League Division B

- Winners: 1973-74

Central Region League Division C

- Winners: 1986-87

Central Region League Division 2

- Winners: 2000-01

Central League Cup

- Winners: 2000-01, 2001-02

Central Sectional Junior League Cup

- Winners: 2001-02

Super League Division 1

- Winners: 2003-04

West of Scotland 2nd Division

- Winners: 2025-26
