= Birch Coppice freight terminal =

Coordinates: 52.591°N 1.632°W

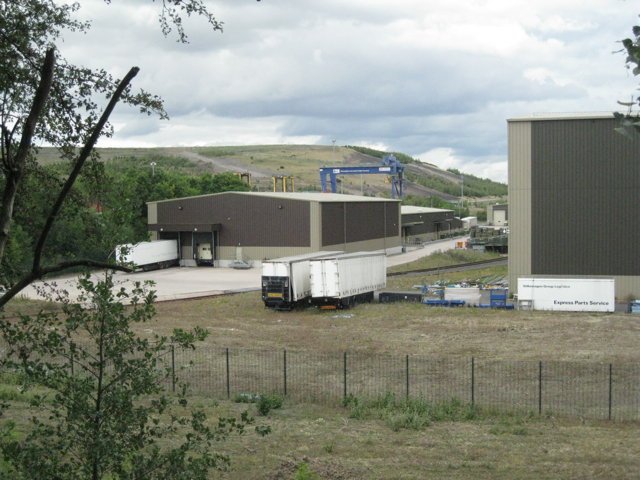
Birch Coppice terminal in August 2011

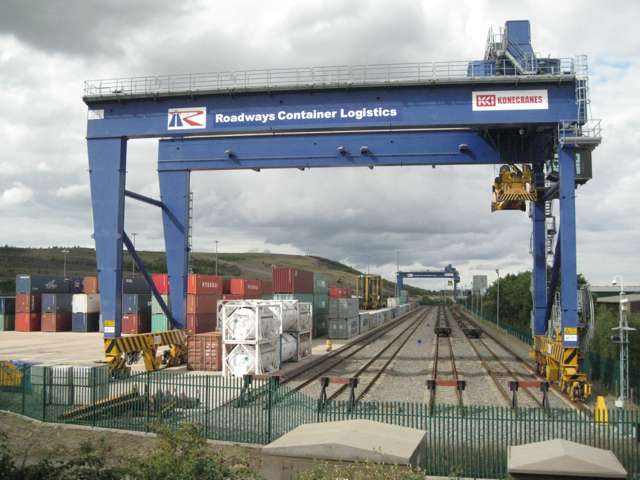
Birch Coppice terminal in September 2021

Birch Coppice freight terminal, also known as Birmingham Intermodal Freight Terminal or Freightliner Birmingham, is a goods station on the outskirts of the English city of Birmingham. It is an inland container port where shipping containers are transferred to and from intermodal freight services going to or coming from seaports. Birch Coppice is located between Tamworth and the village of Dordon on an eponymous business park, around 15 mi from the centre of Birmingham.

== History ==
Birch Coppice pit, known locally as Hall End Pit, was a colliery on the site which opened in 1850 and closed in 1986. The site lay derelict for a decade between 1987 and 1997 until it was purchased by local developers.

The business park and freight terminal arose from the regeneration of the former mine. The terminal took over the former Birch Coppice and Baddesley Collieries line. The developers of the adjacent business park assert that it included the first speculative unit built in the UK after the 2008 crash.

Freightliner initiated a service from Birch Coppice to the Port of Felixstowe in 2009. Advantage West Midlands and Network Rail lowered the railway tracks under two listed bridges in the Whitacre Heath area to enable the haulage of ISO High Cube 9'6" 'big box' containers. Construction started in January 2009 and the rail service commenced in May.

GB Railfreight initiated their own service from Birch Coppice to Felixstowe in September 2015 and another in January 2019. They ran a Christmas special service to the Port of Liverpool in December 2015. They initiated a new regular service to London Gateway in July 2021.

== Services ==
Seven trains serve Birch Coppice a day from the container ports at Felixstowe, Southampton, Tilbury, and Thamesport.

== Future ==
A West Midlands Combined Authority report in 2022 asserts that the West Midlands Rail Executive has been working to "improve access" to the "Birch Coppice / Kingsbury terminal cluster".

== See also ==
- Intermodal railfreight in Great Britain
- Strategic rail freight interchange
