= Peter Jack =

Scottish cricketer

Personal information
- Full name: Peter Andrew Jack
- Born: 26 September 1980 (age 46); Bellshill, Lanarkshire, Scotland
- Batting: Right-handed
- Bowling: Right-arm medium

Domestic team information
- Years: Team
- 1999/00: Scotland

Career statistics
Competition	List A
Matches	1
Runs scored	0
Batting average	–
100s/50s	–/–
Top score	0*
Balls bowled	18
Wickets	0
Bowling average	–
5 wickets in innings	–
10 wickets in match	–
Best bowling	–
Catches/stumpings	–/–
- Source: Cricinfo, 15 July 2022

Peter Andrew Jack (born 26 September 1980) a Scottish former cricketer.

Jack was born in August 1980 at Bellshill, Lanarkshire. Having represented Scotland in age-group cricket, Jack made a single appearance for the senior Scotland team in a List A one-day match against the Netherlands at Harare in the 2000 ICC Six Nations Challenge. He did not play for Scotland again, but did continue to play club cricket for the West of Scotland and Prestwick until 2004. By 2012, Jack had given up playing cricket a number of years prior, with Neil Drysdale of CricketEurope suggesting his early introduction to the senior Scottish side had ruined him.
