= Russell Jones (Scottish cricketer) =

Scottish cricketer (born 1962)

Personal information
- Full name: Russell Rodger Jones
- Born: 17 August 1962 (age 64); Bellshill, Lanarkshire, Scotland
- Batting: Right-handed

Domestic team information
- Years: Team
- 1981: Scotland

Career statistics
Competition	List A
Matches	1
Runs scored	2
Batting average	2.00
100s/50s	–/–
Top score	2
Catches/stumpings	–/–
- Source: Cricinfo, 3 November 2022

Russell Rodger Jones (born 17 August 1962) is a Scottish former cricketer and Royal Air Force officer.

Jones was born in August 1962 at Bellshill, Lanarkshire. A club cricketer for both Clydesdale and Freuchie, he made a single appearance for Scotland in a List A one-day match against Lancashire at Old Trafford in the 1981 Benson & Hedges Cup. Opening the batting, he was dismissed for 2 runs by Paul Allott in Scotland's innings of 154 all out. Outside of cricket, Jones was commissioned into the Royal Air Force as an acting pilot officer in March 1984, having previously been held the rank of aircraftman. He obtained the permanent rank of pilot officer in February the following year, with promotion to flying officer in March 1986. A further promotion to flight lieutenant followed in September 1989, later retiring in August 2001. Following his retirement, he received a commission into the Royal Air Force Volunteer Reserve (Training Branch), before having his commission terminated in April 2002.
