= Sir Matt Busby Sports Complex =

Stadium in Bellshill, North Lanarkshire, Scotland

Coordinates: 55.81879°N 4.03186°W

The Sir Matt Busby Sports Complex is a public leisure centre located in Bellshill, North Lanarkshire, Scotland. It is named in honour of Sir Matt Busby, the football manager who was born in Bellshill in 1909, managed Manchester United from 1945 to 1969 and died in 1994.

It opened in 1995, the year after Busby's death.

An image of Sir Matt's face adorns the centre's reception area.

== Bellshill Sharks ASC ==
The centre is home to Bellshill Sharks ASC - a competitive swimming club. Founded in 1968 the Shark's have produced many talented swimmers over the years included Scottish and British champions. The club train in the pool 6 days a week and continue to be one of the leading Age Group swimming clubs in Scotland.

== Bellshill Athletic F.C. ==
The local football team Bellshill Athletic played their home games on one of the astro-turf pitches after their original home New Brandon Park, in the Hattonrigg area of Bellshill, was shut down to cut costs. That arrangement ended in Summer 2011, when they would move to Fullarton Park in Tollcross, Glasgow.
