= Mossend EuroTerminal =

Location for freight from the Channel Tunnel

Coordinates: 55°49′37.55″N 3°59′53.46″W

Mossend EuroTerminal is a freight-handling station in Mossend. It is situated across the line from the Mossend Railhead.

== History ==
In 1991, the site was selected by British Rail for the only Scottish facility for handling freight arriving in Great Britain from the Channel Tunnel. It was constructed on mostly greenfield land. It opened in 1994. However, demand for international rail freight failed to meet expectations.

In August 2021, it was announced that the site would be leased to Maritime Intermodal from 1 October 2021.

== Operation ==
The facility is operated by DB Cargo UK. It is used for the transfer of freight from rail to road and vice versa, for swapping freight between electric and diesel locomotives, and as a stopping point for crew changes.
