= Castle Donington line =

Railway line in Derbyshire, England

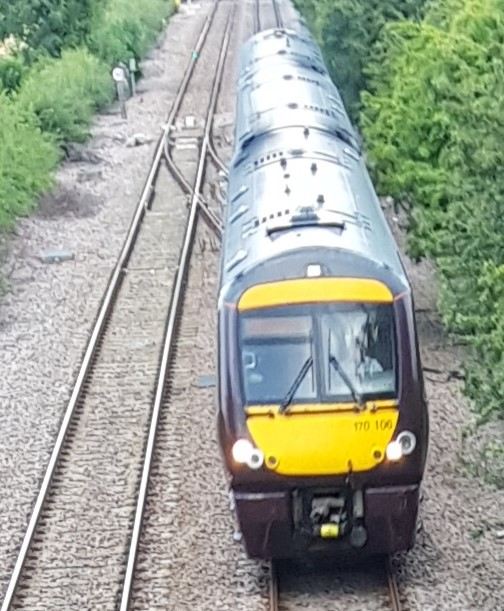
- Class 170 at the site of Castle Donington station

Overview
- Status: No regular passenger Services
- Owner: Network Rail
- Connecting lines: Nottingham–Lincoln line Cross-Country Route; Midland Main Line
- Former connections: Melbourne line
- Stations: None

Service
- Type: Heavy rail
- System: National Rail

History
- Opened: 1869
- Closed: 1930 (to regular passenger services)

Technical
- Number of tracks: Two
- Track gauge: 4 ft 8 1/2 in (1,435 mm) standard gauge
- Electrification: None

The Castle Donington line also known as Weston On Trent Branch Railway is a railway line in Derbyshire, England, that runs between Stenson Junction in the west and Sheet Stores Junction in the east (just north of Trent Junction). There are no passenger services that serve this line regularly but passenger services are occasionally routed across it. Regular passenger services are routed via Derby. The line is regularly used by freight trains and serves the East Midlands Gateway freight interchange. There are no current passenger stations on the line which previously served stations at Castle Donington and Weston-on-Trent and also linked to the Melbourne Line.

The Castle Donington line offers a link between lines in the east including the Nottingham–Lincoln line and Midland Main Line joining just south of Long Eaton with lines in the west Cross-Country Route and Crewe–Derby line, linking just north of Willington. In both cases the links join heading south, thus permitting east-west travel avoiding Derby.

== History ==
Construction of the line was authorised in 1865 and phase 1 to Weston-on-Trent was opened in 1869 by Midland Railway. The line was later extended to Stenson to join the Cross-Country Route. This section opened in 1873. The line closed to passengers in 1930 although some services for Donington Park events continued to run.

The line has been used by a range of freight services including coal trains for Castle Donington Power Station which was built on the same site as the current East Midlands Gateway distribution centre which also has a connection to the line.

The line itself is still open and was used by passenger services during the Derby re-signalling project for services between Birmingham and Nottingham.

== Former Stations ==
=== Castle Donington and Shardlow Station ===
Opened 6 December 1869 as Castle Donington station this station was renamed Castle Donington and Shardlow in 1901 before being closed to passengers in 1930. It was later closed to freight in 1967. It was demolished soon after.

The station was located just to the east of present day station road bridge in Castle Donington. The station comprised two platforms with a small building on the south side and a small shelter on the north side. There were also some sidings, a small building for loading and unload of freight and a signal box. A former inn by Station Road bridge was converted for use as the Station Master's house.

=== Weston on Trent Station ===
Opened in 1869, closed to passengers in 1930 then closed to freight in 1959.

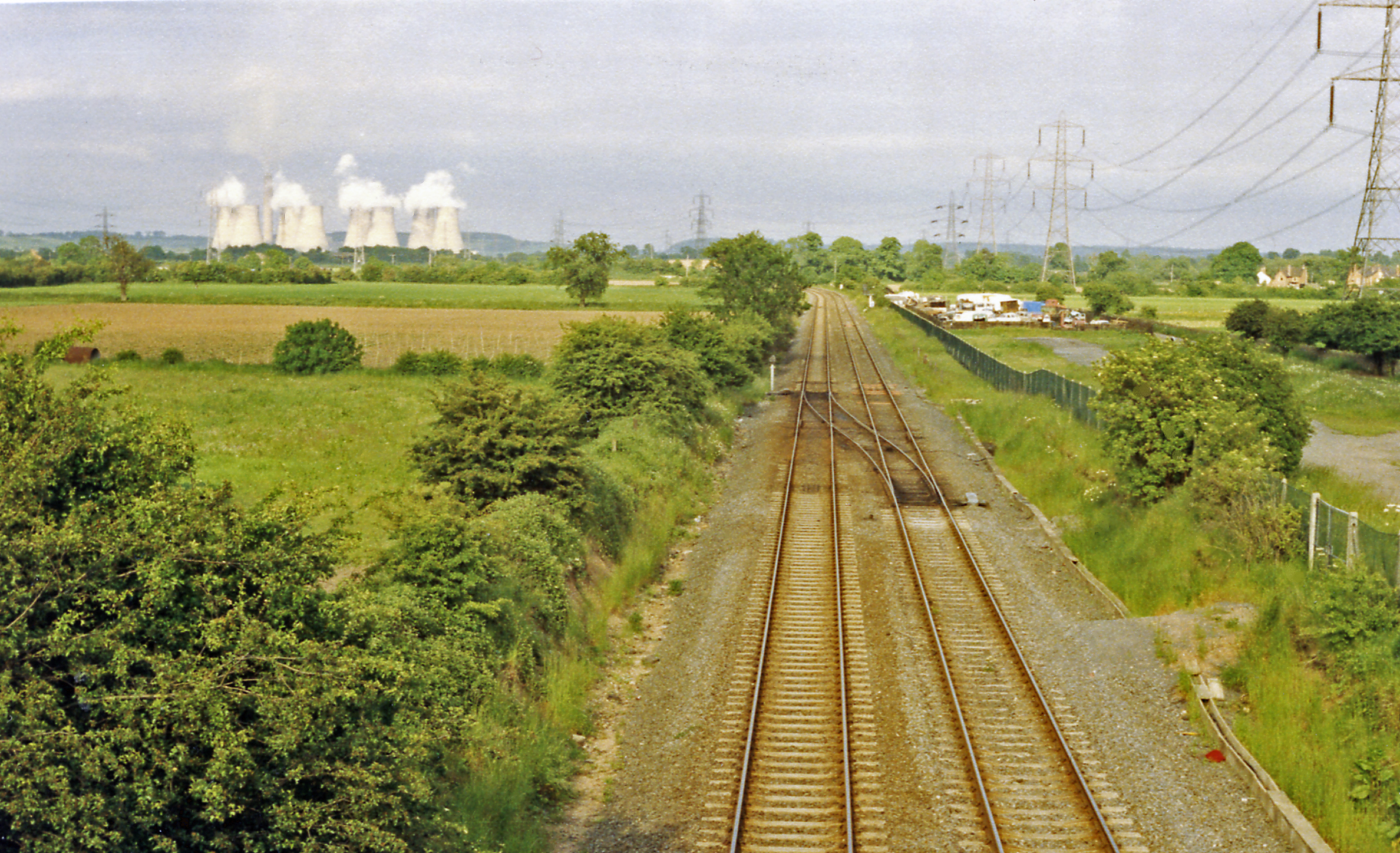
Site of Castle Donington Station

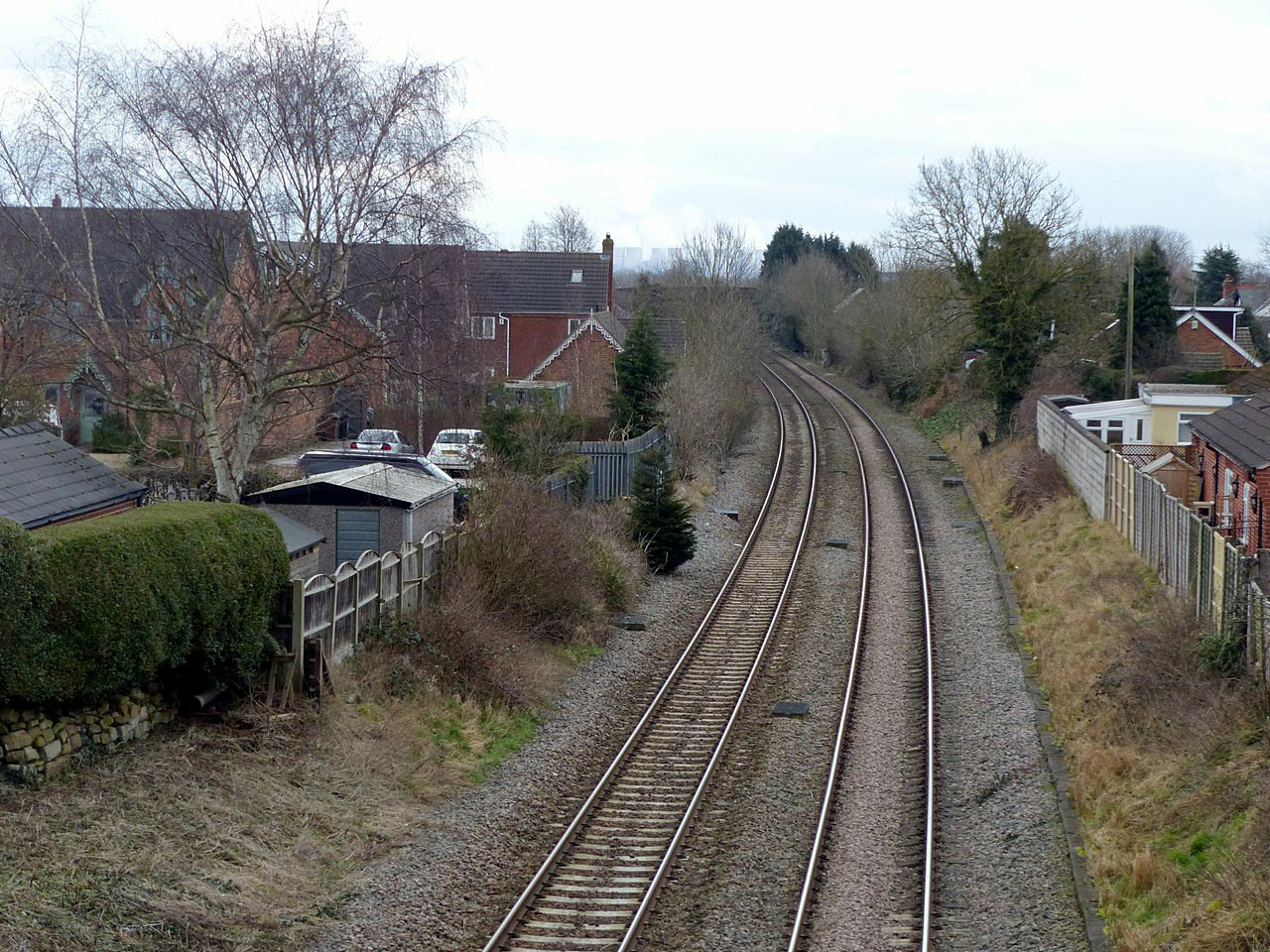
Site of Weston on Trent Station

== Present usage ==
The line offers a route between the East Midlands and West Midlands avoiding Derby, which makes it a good choice for freight traffic. Thus, the line is regularly used by freight trains on a number of different routes, including oil trains between Kingsbury Oil Terminal and Humber Oil Refinery/Lindsey Oil Refinery, stone trains between Peak Forest Quarry and Washwood Heath Asphalt plant, Masborough and the Port of Southampton, trains to Toton TMD as well as other routes.

The line is also used by empty coaching stock for access to Derby Etches Park and daily empties going between Nottingham Station and Tyseley Locomotive Works.

The line is also used by passenger trains as a diversionary route. The Nottingham and Birmingham services ran on this line during the Derby resignalling project.

As of January 2020, the line is used by daily container trains from the port of Felixstowe to the East Midlands Gateway Rail Freight Interchange.

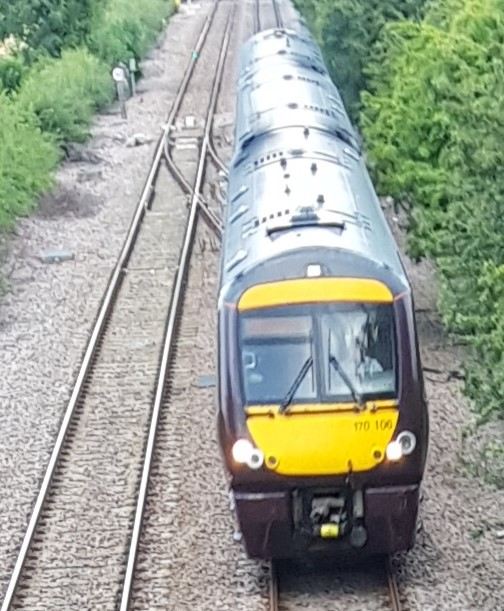
Class 170 in Castle Donington heading towards Birmingham

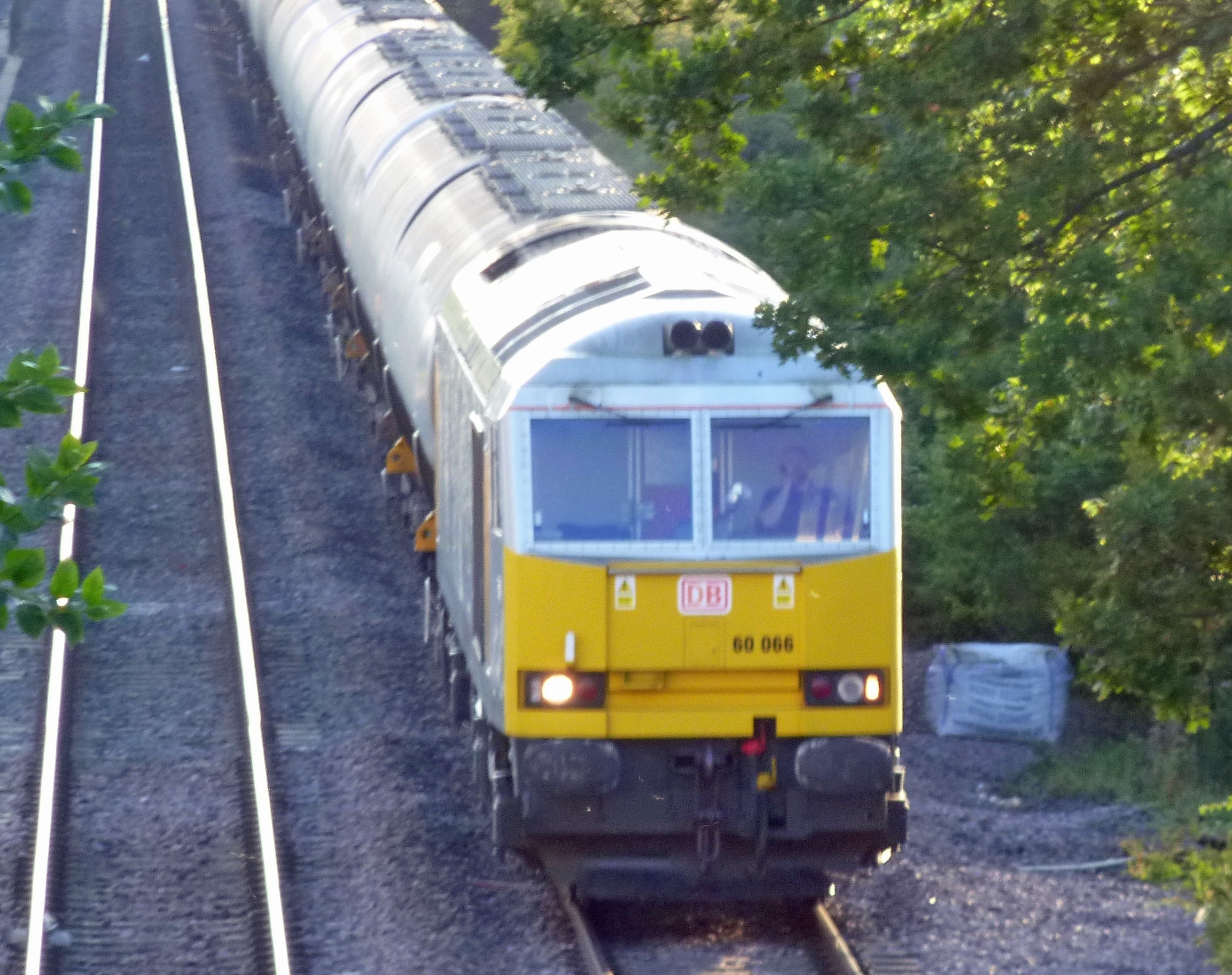
Class 60 oil train in Castle Donington

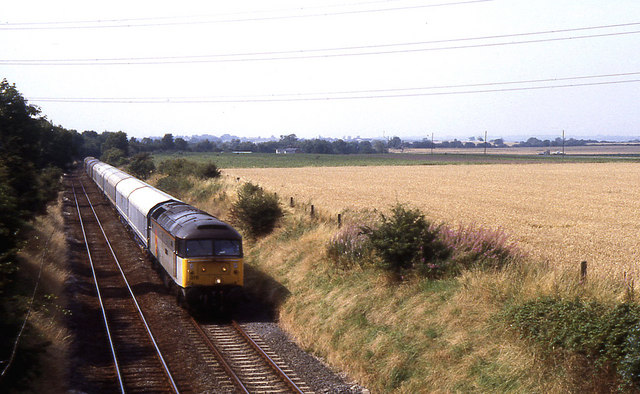
Freight train nr Weston-on-Trent

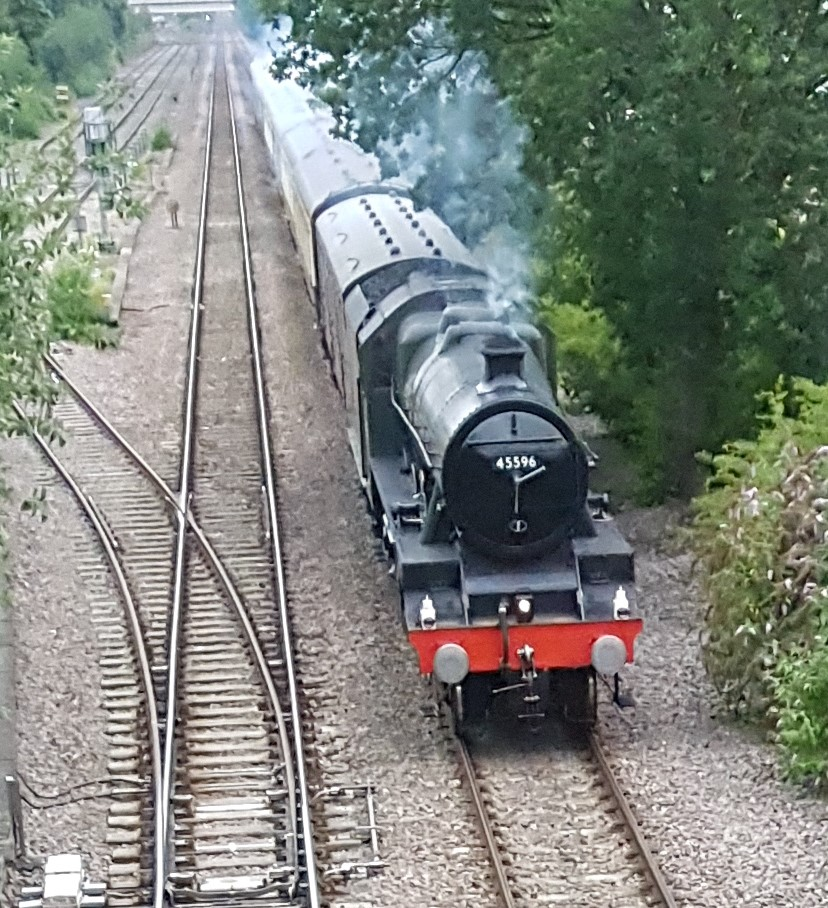
45596 "Bahamas" in Castle Donington
