= Mossend =

Town in North Lanarkshire, Scotland

Coordinates: 55.82030°N 4.00810°W

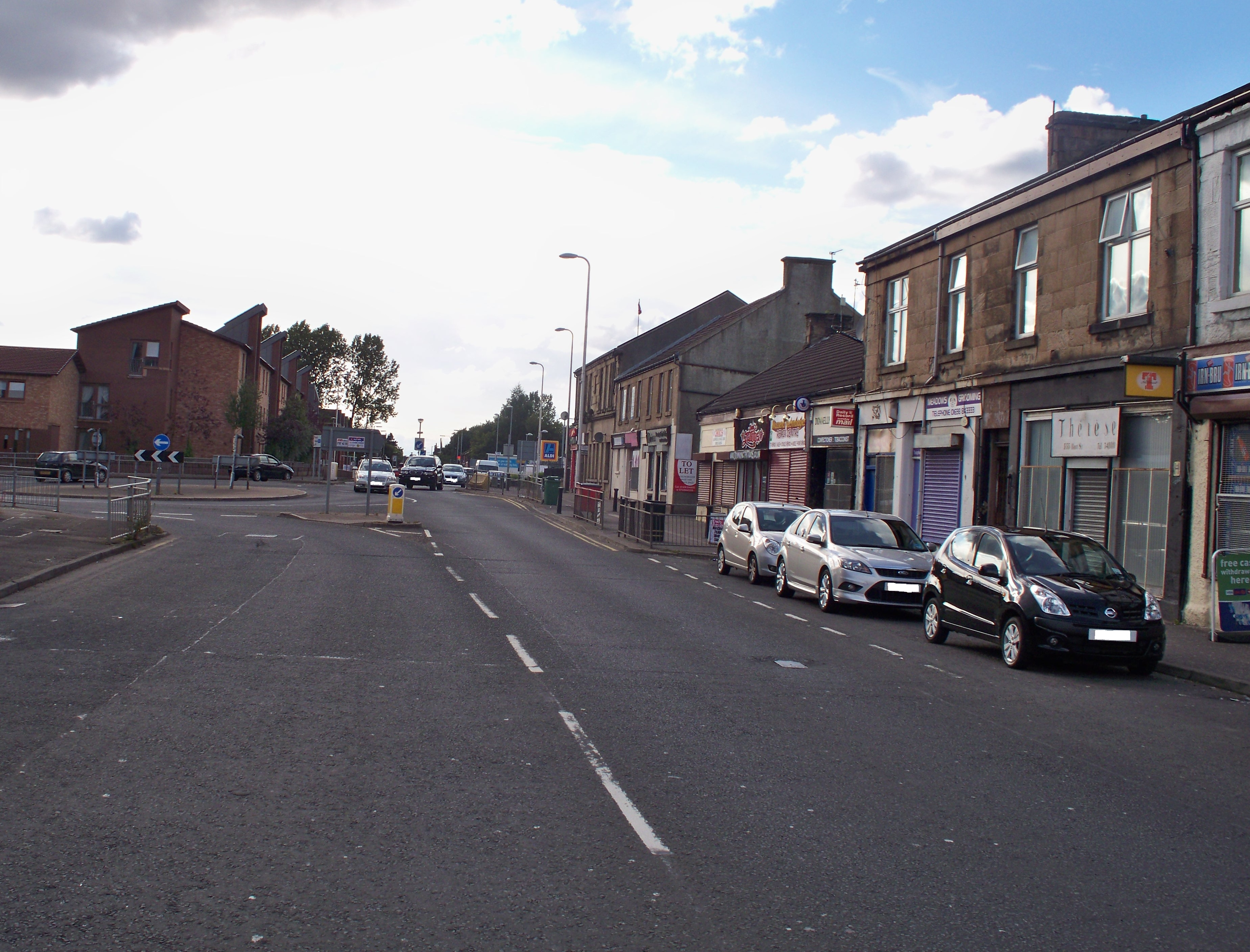
Mossend Cross 2012

Mossend is a village in North Lanarkshire, Scotland, located beside the town of Bellshill, west of the villages of Holytown and New Stevenston, north of the larger town of Motherwell and south of the Eurocentral industrial park and the M8 motorway. Along with Holytown, it forms a council ward which had a population of 13,480 in 2019, Mossend's estimated population being around half of that total.

The town is the site of two railway freight terminals: Mossend International Railfreight Park and Mossend EuroTerminal. The yard is primarily used by DB Cargo UK. Mossend formed around the steel industry, with Clydesdale Steel Works once dominating the east end of the town. It is also home to the Mossend Football Club, a local community football club for children from the age of 6 to 21 years old.

== Early map references ==
Mossend first appears on an early Timothy Pont map at the end of the 16th century as Mossid (Moss-Side), but the name most likely originates from the area being at the end of Moss land. The name 'Mossend' appears in the Roy Lowlands 1752-55 map series. Coal mining is the reason why the town began to expand, and the arrival of Iron and Steel working industry and the attendant railway put Mossend on the map.

== 19th-century developments ==
The creator of the revolutionary hot blast process, J B Neilson, opened the first iron works in the area in 1839 - Mossend Iron Works. The plant became one of the largest producers of malleable iron in Scotland and other iron works followed in the surrounding area, with Clydesdale opening in 1870 and Milnwood in 1872. Steel production using the open hearth process began in Mossend in 1880 and expanded in following years.

== Local schools ==
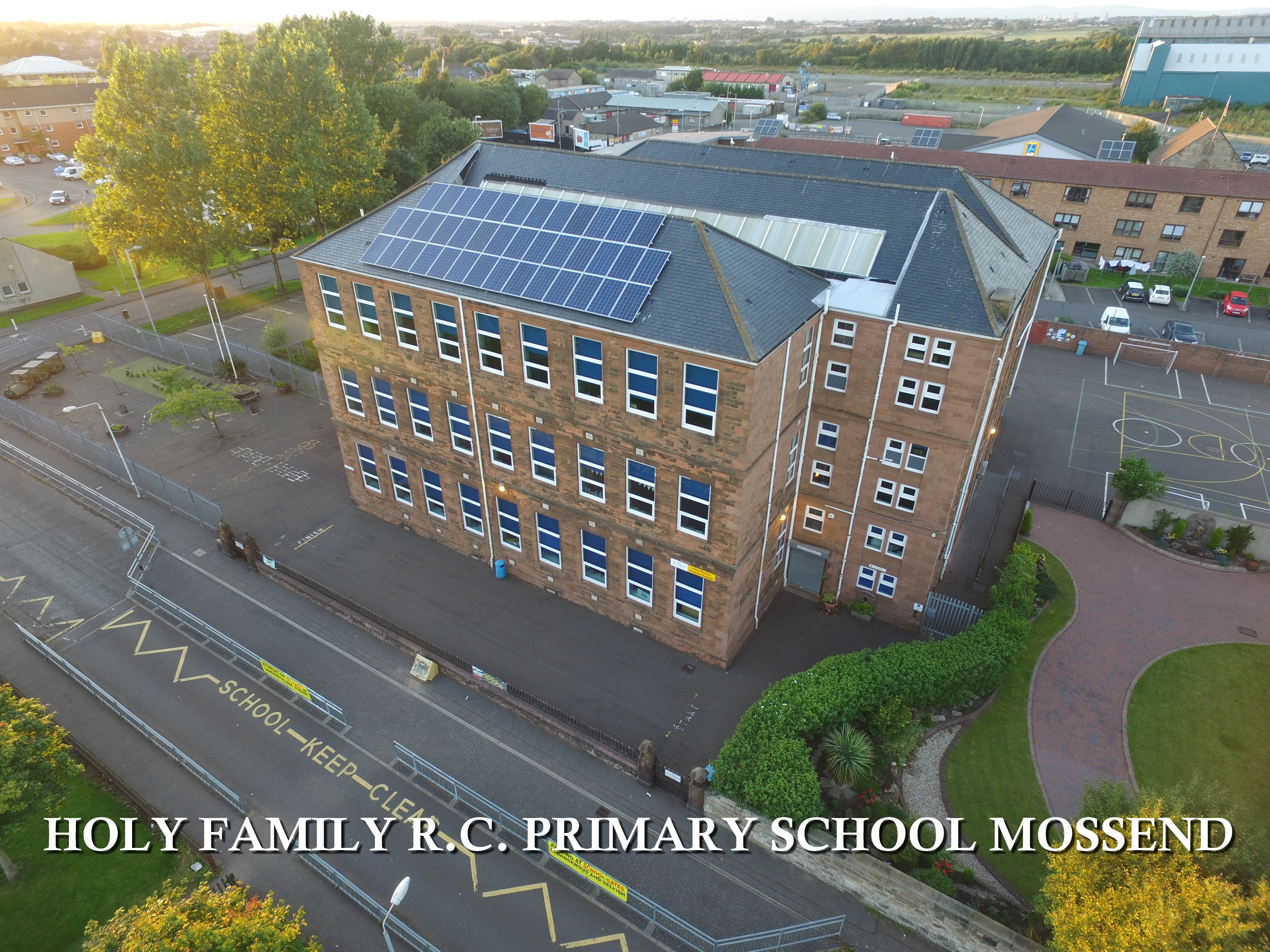
Holy Family Primary School, Mossend

Mossend has two primary schools: Mossend Primary School and the Roman Catholic Holy Family Primary School. In 1868, the Rev. James Milne built a new chapel-school for 140 pupils, dedicated to the Holy Family. Miss Mary McCluskey was appointed headmistress. In 1883 the Rev. Michael Fox erected a large addition to the chapel-school providing accommodation for 400 pupils. Under the inspiration and guidance of the Rev. John Scannell, it was realised in 1904 that a modern school was needed to cope with the increasing roll. The foundation stone was laid on 7 October 1906 by Archbishop Maguire and the three storey, red sandstone building was formally dedicated and opened on Sunday 27 January 1907. By 1916 numbers had rapidly increased and once again classrooms in the old school had to be used. In May 1923 the school roll reached 1,819.

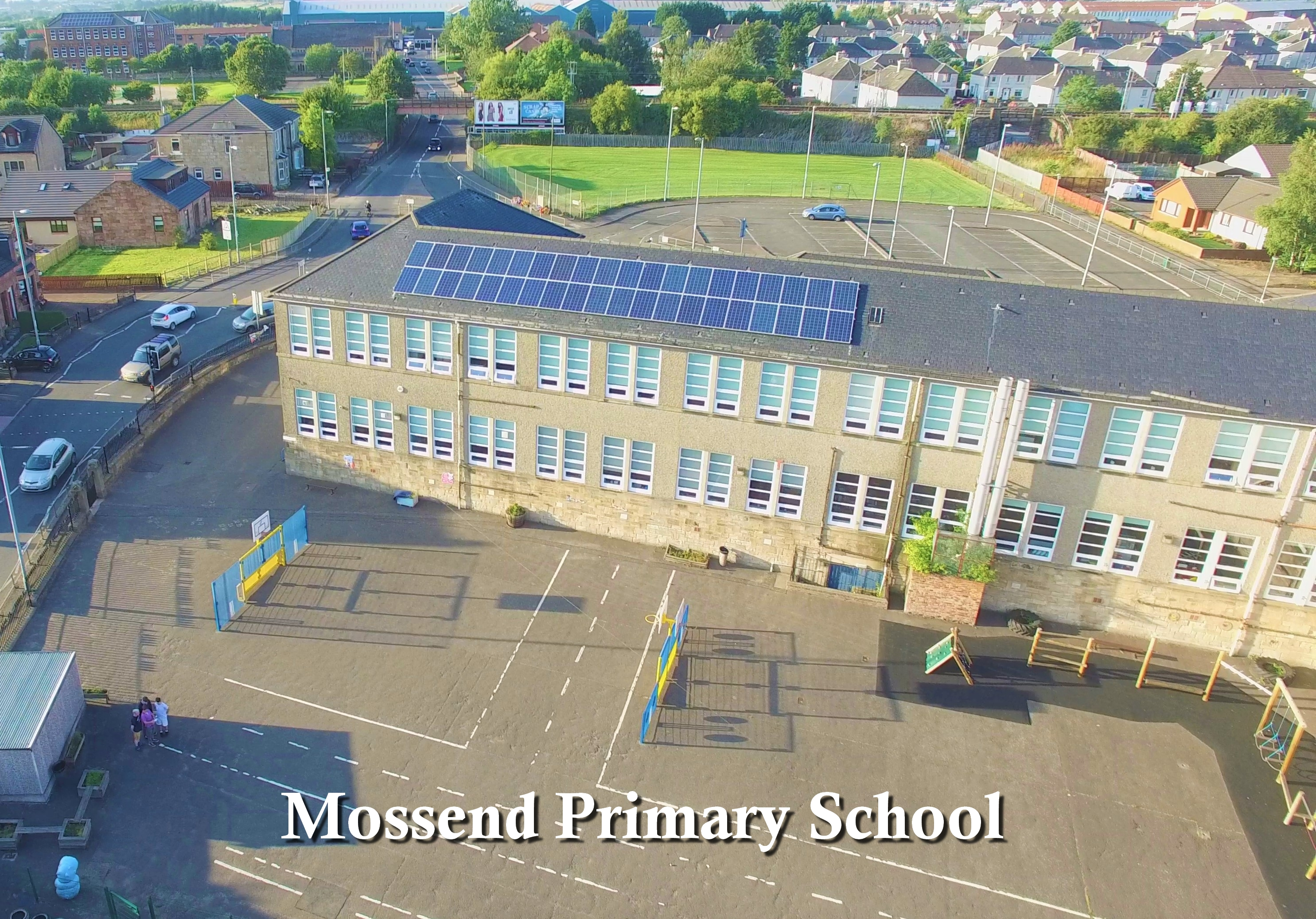
Mossend Primary School

Mossend Primary School in Calder Road was opened in the later part of 1880 as a single-storey building. In 1923 it was seriously damaged by underground mineral workings. In February 1924, a decision was made to demolish the building and build a new school on the same site in brick and roughcast with a stone base. During the rebuild, the pupils were taught on a part-time basis in the canteen of the former projectile works at Mossend Cross. In May 1926 the school was practically ready for occupation and was formally opened by HM Inspector William Robb.

== Holy Family Roman Catholic Church ==
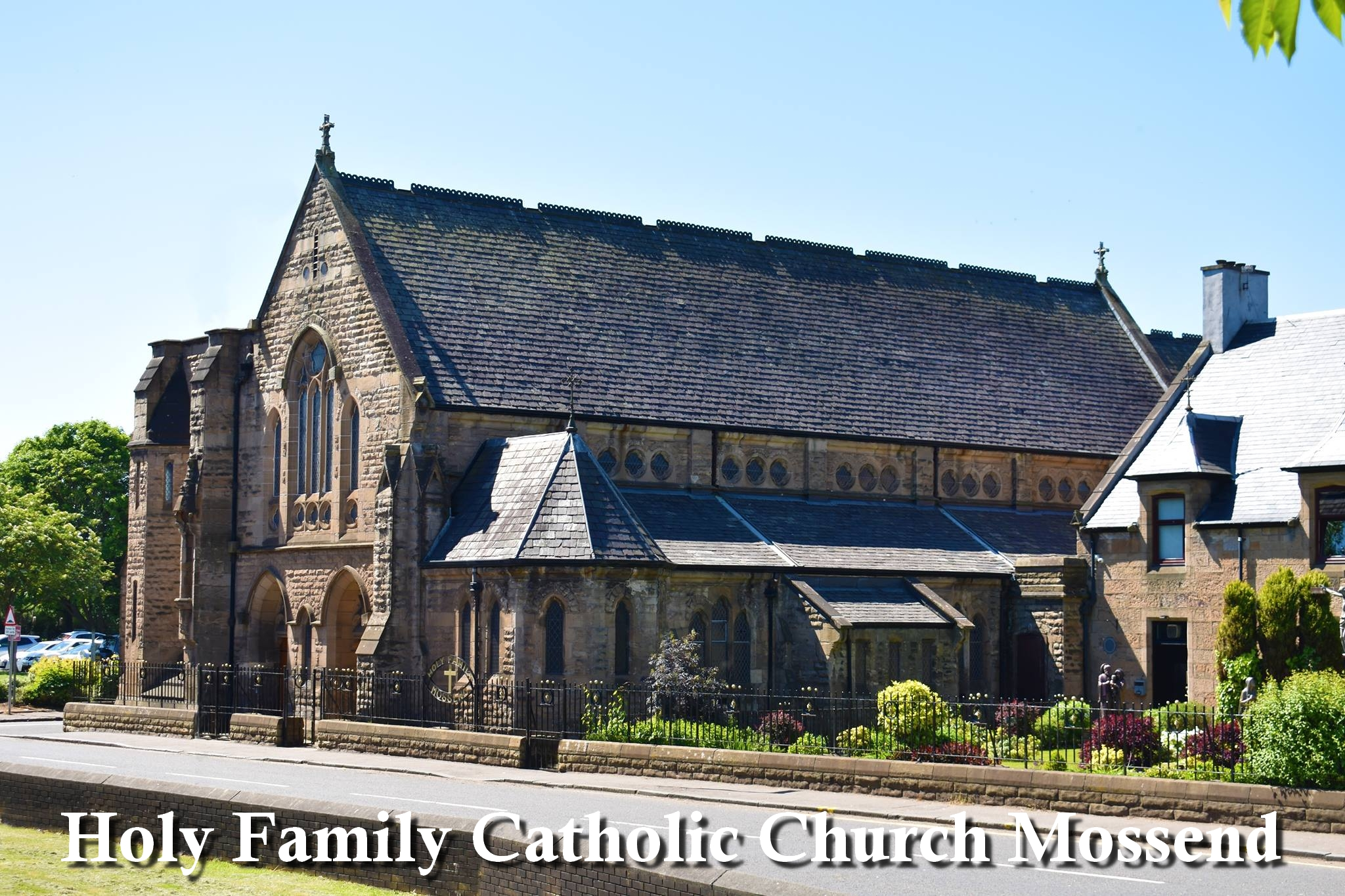
Holy Family R.C Church, Mossend

One of the most striking buildings in Mossend is the church of the Holy Family, which was designed by architects Pugin and Pugin of Wesminister. It was built in 1884 to replace the smaller earlier Catholic church which remains standing beside it. The original Pugin designs envisaged a 124 ft high spire, which was never completed.

The first church building - a chapel school - was completed in 1868 and could seat up to 500 parishioners, a chapel-house was soon added in 1872 and a large addition to the chapel-school in 1883. These buildings are still standing and form what is now the Parochial Hall. In 1883 work began on the erection of a new church which was formally opened on 16 November 1884. The church was at the time described in the Scottish Catholic Directory as "A very beautiful church designed by Messrs Pugin and Pugin, Westminster ... one of the neatest, most chaste and elegant in this part of the country... accommodating upwards of 800 worshipers."

== Namesake in West Lothian ==
In the 19th and early 20th century there was another Mossend located in West Lothian around 15 miles (24 km) east of the Lanarkshire settlement; this was a village just north of West Calder, associated with the shale oil industry and cleared when that declined.

== See also ==
- Mossend and Holytown (ward)
- Mossend EuroTerminal
